= List of Alaska Airlines destinations =

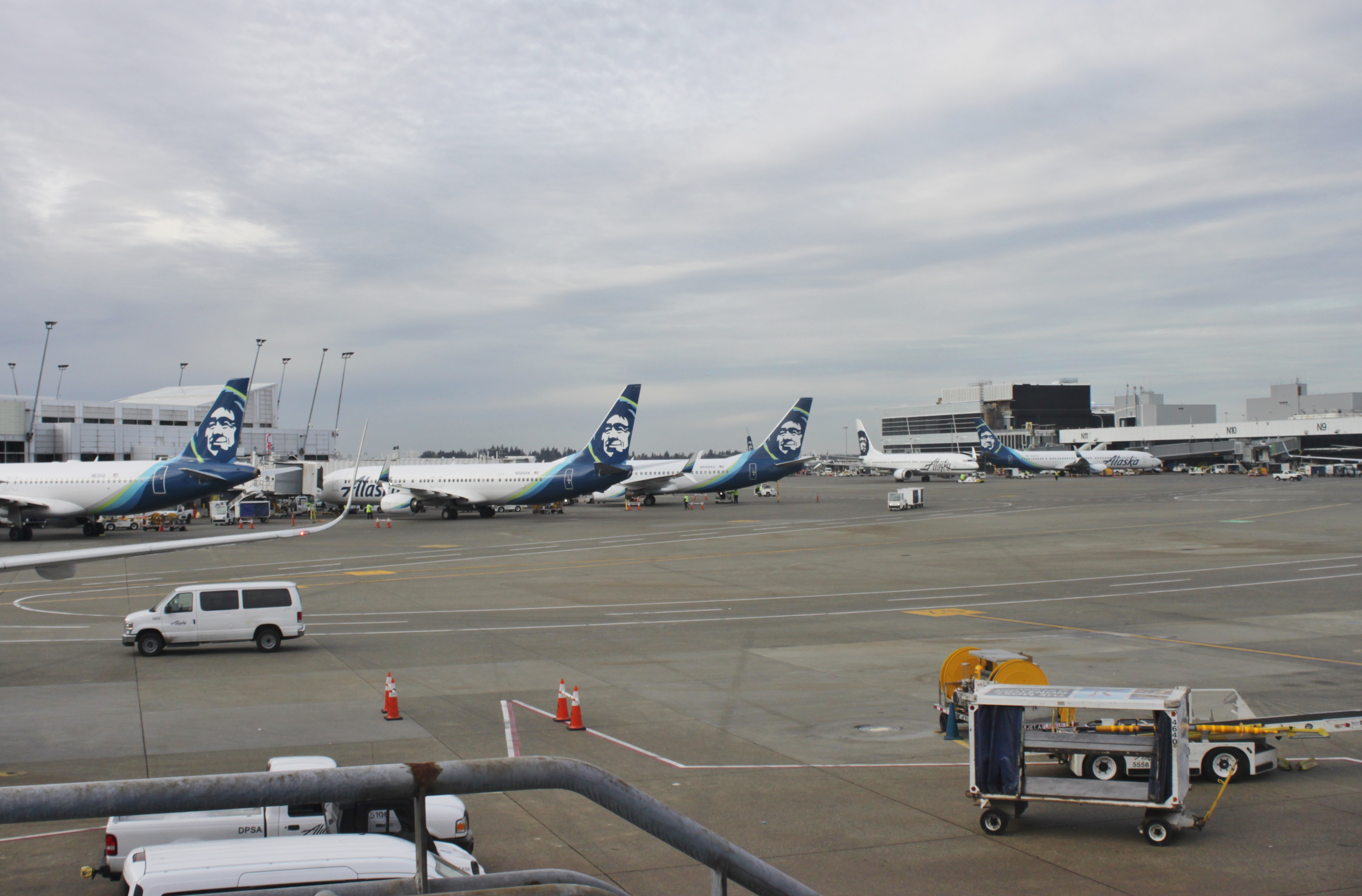
Several Alaska Airlines planes at Seattle–Tacoma International Airport, the airline's largest hub

Alaska Airlines is a major airline in the United States, headquartered in the Seattle metropolitan area, Washington. As of 2021, its combined network offers 1,200 flights to more than 115 destinations in the United States, Canada, Mexico, Costa Rica, and Belize under the Alaska Airlines and Horizon Air brands. Its primary hubs are Seattle–Tacoma International Airport, Portland International Airport, Ted Stevens Anchorage International Airport, and Los Angeles International Airport.

The airline was founded in 1932 and, during the period of regulation, connected numerous airstrips in Alaska to major cities, and the state of Alaska to Seattle. In 1969, Alaska only served Seattle in the lower 48, though they did offer connecting service to Texas on Braniff International Airlines. Alaska also flew to Portland starting in 1951, but later discontinued the route.

After deregulation in 1978, Alaska began connecting California cities to Seattle. In 1985, the airline first served a state that didn't border the Pacific Ocean, starting service to Boise, Idaho; Phoenix, Arizona; and Tucson, Arizona.

Alaska expanded to Mexico in 1988 and began adding destinations in the Midwestern and Eastern United States in the early 2000s. Alaska's first transcontinental route was to Washington, D.C. in 2001. Competition between Alaska Airlines and Delta Air Lines for control of Seattle resulted in a larger expansion in the 2010s. The acquisition of Virgin America by the Alaska Air Group added service to Dallas Love Field when the brands merged in early 2018.

Alaska started service to the state of Hawaii in 2007. After six years of service they flew 11% of all passenger traffic to the state. After its acquisition of Hawaiian Air in 2024, the Alaska Air Group announced plans to launch intercontinental service on up to 12 routes from its hub in Seattle. The first of these routes, to Narita International Airport near Tokyo, debuted in May 2025, followed by service to Seoul/Incheon in September 2025. Additional year-round flights to Rome and London–Heathrow and a seasonal flight to Reykjavík are planned to launch in 2026.

== Historical destinations ==
Alaska was the only airline to fly from the west coast of the United States to Havana, Cuba, with a flight from Los Angeles, which operated from 2017 to 2018. After a seasonal drop in demand, and travel restrictions placed by the Trump administration, the route was discontinued a year after launch.

Beginning in 1991, Alaska Airlines operated weekly service to cities in Eastern Russia from Anchorage, Alaska. The service was canceled in 1998 after the Russian financial crisis.

== List ==
The following is a list of destinations that are served or have been served by Alaska Airlines. These do not include destinations flown only by Horizon Air. Previous cities flown solely by Horizon Air include: Arcata-Eureka, Astoria, Butte, Flagstaff, Klamath Falls, Lewiston, Mammoth Lakes, North Bend-Coos Bay, Pendleton, Port Angeles, Prescott, Prince George, Salem, and Twin Falls.

Key

	Hub
	Focus city
	Seasonal destination
	Future destination
	Terminated destinations
†	Service was discontinued and later restored. Year indicates beginning of initial service.
‡	Service began with an airline that was acquired by Alaska prior to 1969.

Alaska Airlines destinations
City	Country	IATA	ICAO	Airport	Began	Ended	Refs	Notes
Acapulco	Mexico (Guerrero)	ACA	MMAA	Acapulco International Airport				
Adak	United States (Alaska)	ADK	PADK	Adak Airport	2003	present		
Albuquerque	United States (New Mexico)	ABQ	KABQ	Albuquerque International Sunport	2014	present		
Anchorage	United States (Alaska)	ANC	PANC	Ted Stevens Anchorage International Airport	1932	present		
Arcata/Eureka	United States (California)	ACV	KACV	Arcata–Eureka Airport	2026	future		
Atlanta	United States (Georgia)	ATL	KATL	Hartsfield-Jackson Atlanta International Airport	2009	present		
Athens	Greece	ATH	LGAV	Athens International Airport	2027	future		
Austin	United States (Texas)	AUS	KAUS	Austin-Bergstrom International Airport	2009	present		
Baltimore	United States (Maryland)	BWI	KBWI	Baltimore-Washington International Airport	2014	present		
Belize City	Belize	BZE	MZBZ	Philip S. W. Goldson International Airport	2021	present		
Bellingham	United States (Washington)	BLI	KBLI	Bellingham International Airport	2009	present		
Bethel	United States (Alaska)	BET	PABE	Bethel Airport	1984	present		
Billings	United States (Montana)	BIL	KBIL	Billings Logan International Airport	1988	present		
Boise	United States (Idaho)	BOI	KBOI	Boise Airport	1984	present		
Boston	United States (Massachusetts)	BOS	KBOS	Logan International Airport	2002	present		
Bozeman	United States (Montana)	BZN	KBZN	Bozeman Yellowstone International Airport	1990	present		
Burbank	United States (California)	BUR	KBUR	Hollywood Burbank Airport	1981	present		
Calgary	Canada (Alberta)	YYC	CYYC	Calgary International Airport	1992†	present		
Cancún	Mexico (Quintana Roo)	CUN	MMUN	Cancún International Airport	2014†	present		
Charleston	United States (South Carolina)	CHS	KCHS	Charleston International Airport	2015	present		
Chicago	United States (Illinois)	ORD	KORD	O'Hare International Airport	2000	present		
Cincinnati/Covington	United States (Kentucky)	CVG	KCVG	Cincinnati/Northern Kentucky International Airport	2021	present		
Cleveland	United States (Ohio)	CLE	KCLE	Cleveland Hopkins International Airport	2022	present		
Cold Bay	United States (Alaska)	CDB	PACD	Cold Bay Airport	2020	2021		
Colorado Springs	United States (Colorado)	COS	KCOS	Colorado Springs Municipal Airport	2015	2017		
Columbus	United States (Ohio)	CMH	KCMH	John Glenn Columbus International Airport	2019	present		
Cordova	United States (Alaska)	CDV	PACV	Merle K. (Mudhole) Smith Airport	1932	present		
Dallas-Fort Worth	United States (Texas)	DFW	KDFW	Dallas/Fort Worth International Airport	2005	present		
Dallas	United States (Texas)	DAL	KDAL	Dallas Love Field	2017	2025		
Deadhorse/Prudhoe Bay	United States (Alaska)	SCC	PASC	Deadhorse Airport	1981	present		
Denver	United States (Colorado)	DEN	KDEN	Denver International Airport	2002	present		
Detroit	United States (Michigan)	DTW	KDTW	Detroit Metropolitan Airport	2014	present		
Dillingham	United States (Alaska)	DLG	PADL	Dillingham Airport	1992†	present		
Dutch Harbor	United States (Alaska)	DUT	PADU	Unalaska Airport	1993	2004		
Edmonton	Canada (Alberta)	YEG	CYEG	Edmonton International Airport	1995	present		
El Paso	United States (Texas)	ELP	KELP	El Paso International Airport	2019†	Present		
Eugene	United States (Oregon)	EUG	KEUG	Eugene Airport	1982	present		
Everett	United States (Washington)	PAE	KPAE	Paine Field	2019†	present		
Fairbanks	United States (Alaska)	FAI	PAFA	Fairbanks International Airport	1932	present		
Fort Lauderdale	United States (Florida)	FLL	KFLL	Fort Lauderdale-Hollywood International Airport	2012	present		
Fort Myers	United States (Florida)	RSW	KRSW	Southwest Florida International Airport	2020	present		
Fresno	United States (California)	FAT	KFAT	Fresno Yosemite International Airport	1999	present		
Great Falls	United States (Montana)	GTF	KGTF	Great Falls International Airport	1986	present		
Guadalajara	Mexico (Jalisco)	GDL	MMGL	Guadalajara International Airport	2003	present		
Guatemala City	Guatemala	GUA	MGGT	La Aurora International Airport	2023	present		
Gustavus	United States (Alaska)	GST	PAGS	Gustavus Airport	‡	present		
Havana	Cuba	HAV	MUHA	José Martí International Airport	2017	2018		
Helena	United States (Montana)	HLN	KHLN	Helena Regional Airport	1986	present		
Honolulu	United States (Hawaii)	HNL	PHNL	Daniel K. Inouye International Airport	2007	present		
Houston	United States (Texas)	IAH	KIAH	George Bush Intercontinental Airport	2009	present		
Idaho Falls	United States (Idaho)	IDA	KIDA	Idaho Falls Regional Airport	2021	present		
Indianapolis	United States (Indiana)	IND	KIND	Indianapolis International Airport	2017	present		
Ixtapa	Mexico (Guerrero)	ZIH	MMZH	Ixtapa-Zihuatanejo International Airport	1996	present		
Jackson Hole	United States (Wyoming)	JAC	KJAC	Jackson Hole Airport	2020	present		
Juneau	United States (Alaska)	JNU	PAJN	Juneau International Airport	1972	present		
Kahului	United States (Hawaii)	OGG	PHOG	Kahului Airport	2008	present		
Kalispell	United States (Montana)	FCA	KGPI	Glacier Park International Airport	1986	present		
Kansas City	United States (Missouri)	MCI	KMCI	Kansas City International Airport	2012	present		
Kelowna	Canada (British Columbia)	YLW	CYLW	Kelowna International Airport	1998	present		
Ketchikan	United States (Alaska)	KTN	PAKT	Ketchikan International Airport	1972	present		
Khabarovsk	Russia (Khabarovsk Krai)	KHV	UHHH	Khabarovsk Novy Airport	1991	1998		
King Salmon	United States (Alaska)	AKN	PAKN	King Salmon Airport	1992†	present		
Kodiak	United States (Alaska)	ADQ	PADQ	Kodiak Airport	1983†	present		
Kona	United States (Hawaii)	KOA	PHKO	Kona International Airport	2008	present		
Kotzebue	United States (Alaska)	OTZ	PAOT	Ralph Wien Memorial Airport	1980†	present		
La Paz	Mexico (Baja California Sur)	LAP	MMLP	Manuel Márquez de León International Airport	2006†	present		
Las Vegas	United States (Nevada)	LAS	KLAS	Harry Reid International Airport	1985†	present		
Liberia	Costa Rica	LIR	MRLB	Daniel Oduber Quirós International Airport	2015	present		
Lihue	United States (Hawaii)	LIH	PHLI	Lihue Airport	2007	present		
London	United Kingdom (England)	LHR	EGLL	Heathrow Airport	2026	future		
Long Beach	United States (California)	LGB	KLGB	Long Beach Airport	2002	2015		
Loreto	Mexico (Baja California Sur)	LTO	MMLT	Loreto International Airport	2015	present		
Los Angeles	United States (California)	LAX	KLAX	Los Angeles International Airport	1985	present		
Magadan	Russia (Magadan Oblast)	GDX	UHMM	Sokol Airport	1991	1998		
Manzanillo	Mexico (Colima)	ZLO	MMZO	Playa de Oro International Airport	1999	present		
Mazatlán	Mexico (Sinaloa)	MZT	MMMZ	Mazatlán International Airport	1988	present		
Medford	United States (Oregon)	MFR	KMFR	Rogue Valley International–Medford Airport	1982	present		
Mexico City	Mexico (Federal District)	MEX	MMMX	Mexico City International Airport	2005†	2018		
Miami	United States (Florida)	MIA	KMIA	Miami International Airport	2002†	present		
Milwaukee	United States (Wisconsin)	MKE	KMKE	Milwaukee Mitchell International Airport	2015	present		
Minneapolis	United States (Minnesota)	MSP	KMSP	Minneapolis-Saint Paul International Airport	2008	present		
Missoula	United States (Montana)	MSO	KMSO	Missoula Montana Airport	1986	present		
Monterey	United States (California)	MRY	KMRY	Monterey Regional Airport	2021	present		
Monterrey	Mexico (Nuevo León)	MTY	MMMY	Monterrey International Airport	2025	present		
Nashville	United States (Tennessee)	BNA	KBNA	Nashville International Airport	2015	present		
Nassau	Bahamas	NAS	MYNN	Lynden Pindling International Airport	2023	2025		
New Orleans	United States (Louisiana)	MSY	KMSY	Louis Armstrong New Orleans International Airport	2014	present		
New York City	United States (New York)	JFK	KJFK	John F. Kennedy International Airport (Terminal 7)	2007	present		
New York City	United States (New York)	LGA	KLGA	LaGuardia Airport	2014	2018		
Newark	United States (New Jersey)	EWR	KEWR	Newark Liberty International Airport	2002	present		
Nome	United States (Alaska)	OME	PAOM	Nome Airport	1980†	present		
Oakland	United States (California)	OAK	KOAK	Oakland San Francisco Bay Airport	1983	present		
Oklahoma City	United States (Oklahoma)	OKC	KOKC	Will Rogers World Airport	2015	present		
Omaha	United States (Nebraska)	OMA	KOMA	Eppley Airfield	2013	present		
Ontario	United States (California)	ONT	KONT	Ontario International Airport	1981	present		
Orange County/Santa Ana	United States (California)	SNA	KSNA	John Wayne Airport	1987	present		
Orlando	United States (Florida)	MCO	KMCO	Orlando International Airport	2003	present		
Palm Springs	United States (California)	PSP	KPSP	Palm Springs International Airport	1980	present		
Pasco	United States (Washington)	PSC	KPSC	Tri-Cities Airport	1981	present		
Petersburg	United States (Alaska)	PSG	PAPG	Petersburg James A. Johnson Airport	1976	present		
Petropavlovsk-Kamchatsky	Russia (Kamchatka Oblast)	PKC	UHPP	Petropavlovsk-Kamchatsky Airport	1991	1998		
Philadelphia	United States (Pennsylvania)	PHL	KPHL	Philadelphia International Airport	2012	present		
Phoenix	United States (Arizona)	PHX	KPHX	Phoenix Sky Harbor International Airport	1985	present		
Pittsburgh	United States (Pennsylvania)	PIT	KPIT	Pittsburgh International Airport	2018	present		
Portland	United States (Oregon)	PDX	KPDX	Portland International Airport	1951†	present		
Puerto Vallarta	Mexico (Jalisco)	PVR	MMPR	Licenciado Gustavo Díaz Ordaz International Airport	1988	present		
Pullman	United States (Washington)	PUW	KPUW	Pullman–Moscow Regional Airport	1982†	present		
Raleigh	United States (North Carolina)	RDU	KRDU	Raleigh-Durham International Airport	2015	present		
Redding	United States (California)	RDD	KRDD	Redding Municipal Airport	2021	present		
Redmond	United States (Oregon)	RDM	KRDM	Roberts Field	1982†	present		
Reno	United States (Nevada)	RNO	KRNO	Reno–Tahoe International Airport	1993	present		
Reykjavík	Iceland	KEF	BIKF	Keflavík International Airport	2026	Present		
Rome	Italy (Lazio)	FCO	LIRF	Rome Fiumicino Airport	2026	present		
Sacramento	United States (California)	SMF	KSMF	Sacramento International Airport	1993	present		
Salt Lake City	United States (Utah)	SLC	KSLC	Salt Lake City International Airport	2013	present		
San Antonio	United States (Texas)	SAT	KSAT	San Antonio International Airport	2012	present		
San Diego	United States (California)	SAN	KSAN	San Diego International Airport	1986	present		
San Francisco	United States (California)	SFO	KSFO	San Francisco International Airport	1979	present		
San Jose	United States (California)	SJC	KSJC	San Jose International Airport	1983	present		
San José	Costa Rica	SJO	MROC	Juan Santamaría International Airport	2015	present		
San José del Cabo	Mexico (Baja California Sur)	SJD	MMSD	Los Cabos International Airport	1989	present		
San Luis Obispo	United States (California)	SBP	KSBP	San Luis Obispo County Regional Airport	2017	present		
Santa Barbara	United States (California)	SBA	KSBA	Santa Barbara Municipal Airport	2017	present		
Seattle	United States (Washington)	SEA	KSEA	Seattle–Tacoma International Airport	1951	present		
Seoul	South Korea (Incheon)	ICN	RKSI	Incheon International Airport	2025	present		
Sitka	United States (Alaska)	SIT	PASI	Sitka Rocky Gutierrez Airport	1967	present		
Spokane	United States (Washington)	GEG	KGEG	Spokane International Airport	1983†	present		
Sonoma County	United States (California)	STS	KSTS	Charles M. Schulz–Sonoma County Airport	2007	present		
St. Louis	United States (Missouri)	STL	KSTL	St. Louis Lambert International Airport	2010	present		
Steamboat Springs	United States (Colorado)	HDN	KHDN	Yampa Valley Airport	2013	present		
Sun Valley	United States (Idaho)	SUN	KSUN	Friedman Memorial Airport	1982†	present		
Tampa	United States (Florida)	TPA	KTPA	Tampa International Airport	2014	present		
Tokyo	Japan (Chiba)	NRT	RJAA	Narita International Airport	2025	present		
Toronto	Canada (Ontario)	YYZ	CYYZ	Toronto Pearson International Airport	1991†	present		
Tucson	United States (Arizona)	TUS	KTUS	Tucson International Airport	1985†	present		
Tulsa	United States (Oklahoma)	TUL	KTUL	Tulsa International Airport	2026	future		
Utqiaġvik	United States (Alaska)	BRW	PABR	Wiley Post–Will Rogers Memorial Airport	1992	present		
Vail	United States (Colorado)	EGE	KEGE	Eagle County Regional Airport	2024	present		
Vancouver	Canada (British Columbia)	YVR	CYVR	Vancouver International Airport	1989†	present		
Vladivostok	Russia (Primorsky Krai)	VVO	UHWW	Vladivostok International Airport	1993	1998		
Victoria	Canada (British Columbia)	YYJ	CYYJ	Victoria International Airport	1989	present		
Walla Walla	United States (Washington)	ALW	KALW	Walla Walla Regional Airport	1985	present		
Washington, D.C.	United States (Virginia)	DCA	KDCA	Ronald Reagan Washington National Airport	2001	present		
Washington, D.C.	United States (Virginia)	IAD	KIAD	Washington Dulles International Airport	2001†	present		
Wenatchee	United States (Washington)	EAT	KEAT	Pangborn Memorial Airport	1984	present		
Wichita	United States (Kansas)	ICT	KICT	Wichita Eisenhower National Airport	2017	present		
Wrangell	United States (Alaska)	WRG	PAWG	Wrangell Airport	1976	present		
Yakima	United States (Washington)	YKM	KYKM	Yakima Air Terminal	1981	present		
Yakutat	United States (Alaska)	YAK	PAYA	Yakutat Airport	‡	present		
Yuzhno-Sakhalinsk	Russia (Sakhalin Oblast)	UUS	UHSS	Yuzhno-Sakhalinsk Airport	1997	1998		
