= Wings of Alaska =

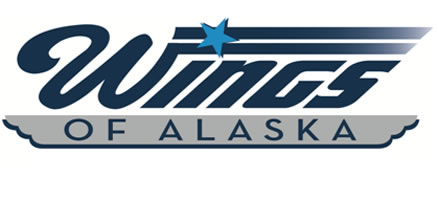
| IATA | ICAO | Call sign |
|---|---|---|
| K5 | SQH | SASQUACH |
- Founded: 1982; 44 years ago
- Ceased operations: March 13, 2017; 9 years ago
- Hubs: Juneau International Airport
- Focus cities: Skagway, Haines, Gustavus (Glacier Bay), Hoonah (Icy Straight), Juneau
- Fleet size: 2
- Destinations: 5
- Parent company: Glacial Aviation
- Headquarters: Juneau, Alaska, USA
- Key people: Aldwin Harder-Managing Partner
- Website: www.wingsofalaska.com

Wings of Alaska was an American scheduled and charter airline company based in Juneau in the U.S. state of Alaska.

== History ==
Wings of Alaska was set up in 1982 to provide scheduled, chartered and freight flights services to many of the communities across Southeast, Alaska. Wings of Alaska was one of seven airlines in Alaska with the Medallion Foundation Shield, which has strict safety and operational guidelines that exceed the Federal Aviation Regulations. Wings was the only scheduled land-based airline in Southeast Alaska to have earned this Shield. Wings' fleet was equipped with state-of-the-art Chelton Flight Systems Capstone Program, offering "Highway In The Sky" technology.

In 2008, Wings of Alaska was acquired by SeaPort Airlines. Following the acquisition, its headquarters were moved to Portland, Oregon. The combined airline maintained a single FAA operating certificate to operate single scheduled and non-scheduled flights in the Lower 48 market.

In 2015 Wings of Alaska was acquired from Seaport Airlines, by a locally owned Alaska business partnership, Fjord Flying Services, but continued to operate under the Wings of Alaska name. The company said it planned to focus on the locals and connections within the state itself, rather than connections to the continental U.S.

In March 2017, Wings of Alaska announced that it was going out of business, ceasing operations immediately.

== Destinations ==
Wings of Alaska operated scheduled flights to the following locations in Alaska:

| City | ICAO | Airport |
|---|---|---|
| Juneau | JNU | Juneau International Airport |
| Gustavus | GST | Gustavus Airport |
| Haines | HNS | Haines Airport |
| Hoonah | HNH | Hoonah Airport |
| Skagway | SGY | Skagway Airport |

Former scheduled destinations:

| City | ICAO | Airport |
|---|---|---|
| Excursion Inlet | EXI | Excursion Inlet Seaplane Base |

They also have charter service throughout Alaska.

== Fleet ==
A list of aircraft used by Wings of Alaska:

| Aircraft | In service | Passengers |
|---|---|---|
| Cessna 207 | 3 | 5 |
| Cessna U206 | 3 | 4 |
| DHC2 Beaver | 4 | 6 |
| DHC3 Otter | 3 | 10 |

== Incidents ==
Wings of Alaska Flight 202, a Cessna 207 carrying one pilot and four passengers, crashed into a mountain between Juneau and Hoonah on July 17, 2015. The pilot died, while all four passengers survived. The National Transportation Safety Board investigated the crash and determined the cause was pilot error due to unfavorable weather conditions. Mechanical failure was not a factor in the crash.

== See also ==
- List of defunct airlines of the United States
