= Sitka Rocky Gutierrez Airport =

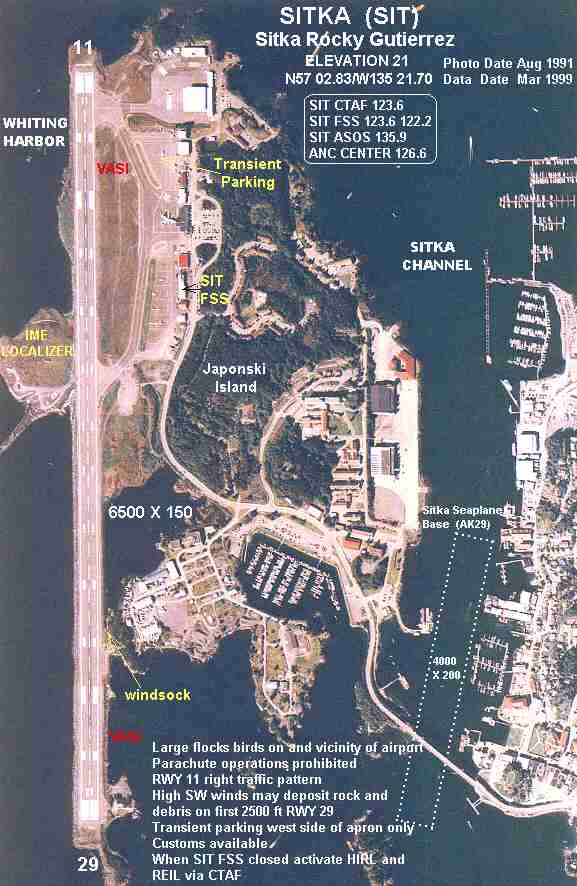
- IATA: SIT; ICAO: PASI; FAA LID: SIT

Summary
- Airport type: Public
- Owner: State of Alaska DOT&PF
- Serves: Sitka, Alaska
- Location: Japonski Island
- Elevation AMSL: 26 ft (7.9 m)
- Coordinates: 57°02′50″N 135°21′42″W

Map
- Location of airport in Alaska

Runways
Direction	Length		Surface
Direction	ft	m	Surface
11/29	7,200	2,195	Asphalt

Statistics (2011)
- Aircraft operations: 23,100
- Based aircraft: 30
- Source: Federal Aviation Administration

Sitka Rocky Gutierrez Airport (IATA: SIT, ICAO: PASI, FAA LID: SIT) is a state-owned, public-use airport located west of the central business district of Sitka, a city and borough in the U.S. state of Alaska.

The airport is named after Sitka's former mayor Rocky Gutierrez. It features a single terminal with jetway with air service operated year-round by Alaska Airlines. There is a single paved runway located on a causeway that juts off Japonski Island. Deceased tuberculosis patients from the nearby SEARHC/Mt. Edgecumbe Hospital were buried on airport grounds and had to be relocated during construction. That section of the airport is still unofficially called The Mausoleum.

As per Federal Aviation Administration records, the airport had 68,197 passenger boardings (enplanements) in calendar year 2008, 62,498 enplanements in 2009, and 64,536 in 2010. It is included in the National Plan of Integrated Airport Systems for 2015-2019, which categorized it as a primary commercial service (nonhub) airport (more than 10,000 enplanements per year) based on 68,222 enplanements in 2012.

== Facilities and aircraft ==
Sitka Rocky Gutierrez Airport resides at elevation of 26 feet (8 m) above mean sea level. It has one runway designated 11/29 with an asphalt surface measuring 7,200 by 150 feet (2,195 x 46 m).

For the 12-month period ending January 2, 2011, the airport had 23,100 aircraft operations, an average of 63 per day: 43% air taxi, 43% general aviation, 8% scheduled commercial, and 6% military. At that time there were 30 aircraft based at this airport: 70% single-engine, 13% ultralight, 10% military, and 7% multi-engine.

The airport also has hangars and offices for local air traffic control, the Civil Air Patrol, and various private enterprises. U.S. Coast Guard Air Station Sitka also has a complex attached to the airport for their helicopters but their rotary-wing aircraft based in Sitka seldom use the runway for takeoffs and landings.

Safety hazards include ocean waves washing onto the runway during storms, high winds because of its exposed location, and large flocks of birds that live very close to the airport. Due to these hazards, the airport is listed by airfarewatchdog.com as one of the ten most thrilling landing experiences in the world.

== Historical airline service ==
Alaska Airlines has served Sitka for over 50 years. In 1967, Alaska Air was operating Boeing 727-100 jet service into the airport on a round trip routing of Seattle - Sitka - Anchorage - Unalakleet - Nome - Kotzebue and was also flying Convair 240 propliner service nonstop to Juneau. By 1969, Alaska Air had added several stops on the route between Seattle and Alaska, and was operating a Boeing 727-100 jetliner on a round trip routing of Seattle - Sitka - Juneau - Yakutat - Cordova - Anchorage - Unalakleet - Nome - Kotzebue in addition to operating Convair 240 service on a round trip routing of Annette Island Airport - Wrangell - Petersburg - Sitka - Juneau. Over the years, Alaska Air also operated Boeing 727-200 and 737-200 jets into the airport before switching to later model Boeing 737 jetliners. In 1986, Anchorage-based AirPac was operating jet service into the airport with a British Aerospace BAe 146-100 aircraft flying a round trip routing of Seattle - Sitka - Anchorage.

== Airlines and destinations ==
=== Passenger ===
Airlines	Destinations
Air Excursions	Juneau, Kake, Klawock
Alaska Airlines	Juneau, Ketchikan; Seasonal: Seattle/Tacoma
Alaska Seaplanes	Angoon, Elfin Cove, Gustavus, Haines, Hoonah, Juneau, Kake, Klawock, Pelican, Skagway, Tenakee Springs

Alaska Airlines operates Boeing 737-700, 737-800, and Boeing 737-900 jetliners. In addition to providing passenger service, Alaska Airlines also operates Boeing 737-700 all-cargo jet freighter flights into the airport.

=== Top destinations ===
Busiest domestic routes out of SIT (July 2024 – June 2025)
Rank	City	Passengers	Carriers
1	Seattle/Tacoma, WA	45,910	Alaska
2	Juneau, AK	25,920	Alaska, Air Excursions
3	Anchorage, AK	17,650	Alaska
4	Ketchikan, AK	4,070	Alaska
5	Kake, AK	930	Alaska Seaplanes
6	Klawock, AK	590	Island Air Express

== Media appearances ==
- Sitka Rocky Gutierrez Airport is the destination in the mission "Sitka Approach" supplied with Microsoft Flight Simulator X.
- In the 2009 movie The Proposal, scenes purportedly at Sitka Rocky Gutierrez Airport were actually filmed at Beverly Regional Airport in Beverly, Massachusetts, near Boston, Massachusetts.

== See also ==
- List of airports in Alaska
- Sitka Seaplane Base at coordinates 57°03′08″N 135°20′46″W
