= Excursion Inlet Seaplane Base =

Airport in Alaska, United States

- IATA: EXI; ICAO: none; FAA LID: EXI

Summary
- Airport type: Public
- Owner: State of Alaska DOT&PF - Southeast Region
- Serves: Excursion Inlet, Alaska
- Elevation AMSL: 0 ft (0 m)
- Coordinates: 58°25′14″N 135°26′57″W

Map
- Location of airport in Alaska

Runways
Direction	Length		Surface
Direction	ft	m	Surface
NW/SE	1,000	305	Water

Statistics (2016)
- Aircraft operations (2015): 200
- Based aircraft: 0
- Passengers: 148
- Freight: 26,000 lbs
- Source: Federal Aviation Administration; Source: Bureau of Transportation

Excursion Inlet Seaplane Base (IATA: EXI, FAA LID: EXI) is a state owned, public use seaplane base located in Excursion Inlet, in the Haines Borough of the U.S. state of Alaska. Scheduled passenger service is subsidized by the U.S. Department of Transportation via the Essential Air Service program.

This airport is included in the National Plan of Integrated Airport Systems for 2015–2019, which categorized it as a general aviation airport based on 69 enplanements (boardings) in calendar year 2012. As per Federal Aviation Administration records, the airport had 69 passenger enplanements in calendar year 2008, 68 enplanements in 2009, and 30 in 2010.

== Facilities and aircraft ==
Excursion Inlet Seaplane Base has one seaplane landing area designated NW/SE with a water surface measuring 1,000 by 1,000 feet (305 x 305 m). For the 12-month period ending December 31, 2006, the airport had 700 aircraft operations, an average of 58 per month: 71% general aviation and 29% air taxi.

== Airlines and destinations ==
The following airline offers scheduled passenger service:

Airlines	Destinations
Alaska Seaplanes	Juneau
Ward Air	Juneau

=== Statistics ===
Top domestic destinations: January – December 2016
Rank	City	Airport	Passengers
1	(Alaska) Juneau, AK	Juneau International Airport	70
2	(Alaska) Gustavus, AK	Gustavus Airport	10

== See also ==
- List of airports in Alaska

== Other sources ==
- Essential Air Service documents (Docket DOT-OST-2002-12014) from the U.S. Department of Transportation:
  - Order 2005-8-14 (August 18, 2005): re-selecting L.A.B. Flying Service, Inc., to provide essential air service to Excursion Inlet, Alaska, and establishing a subsidy rate of $9,212 per year for service consisting of one round trip each week during the winter season (October–March), over a Juneau-Excursion Inlet-Juneau routing, with 5-seat Piper PA-32 or 3-seat Helio H-250 aircraft, for the two-year period beginning September 1, 2005, and ending August 31, 2007.
  - Order 2006-8-20 (August 20, 2007): selecting L.A.B. Flying Service, to continue providing essential air service (EAS) at Excursion Inlet, Alaska, and establishing an annual subsidy rate of $32,886, for a new two-year period, through August 31, 2009.
  - Order 2008-7-29 (July 25, 2008): requesting proposals by August 1, 2008, from carriers interested in providing essential air service (EAS) at Kake and Excursion Inlet, Alaska, for a two-year period, beginning when the carrier can inaugurate service, with or without subsidy. (On July 24, 2008, the Federal Aviation Administration revoked the operating certificate of LAB Flying Service, Inc., on an emergency basis.)
  - Order 2008-8-16 (August 15, 2008): selecting Alaska Juneau Aeronautics, Inc., d/b/a Wings of Alaska, Inc. (Wings), to provide essential air service at Excursion Inlet and Kake, Alaska, at annual subsidy rates of $34,659 at Excursion Inlet and $314,302 at Kake, for the two-year period ending August 31, 2010.
  - Order 2010-8-9 (August 17, 2010): re-selecting Alaska Juneau Aeronautics, Inc., d/b/a Wings of Alaska, Inc., to provide essential air service (EAS) at Excursion Inlet, Alaska, for an annual subsidy rate of $33,919, for the two-year period from September 1, 2010, to August 31, 2012.
  - Order 2012-9-8 (September 10, 2012): selecting Air Excursions to provide EAS at Excursion Inlet for a first-year annual subsidy of $27,111 and a second-year annual subsidy of $28,835. The airline will provide three weekly nonstop round trips to Juneau during the 21-week peak season with PA-32 Cherokee 6 aircraft, and one weekly nonstop round trip during the 31-week off-peak using Cessna 206 float aircraft, beginning when the airline commences full EAS.
