= Alaska Coastal Airlines =

Airline in the United States

| IATA | ICAO | Call sign |
|---|---|---|
| AK^{(1)} | AK^{(1)} | — |
- Founded: 1939; 87 years ago
- Ceased operations: 1968; 58 years ago (acquired by Alaska Airlines)
- Destinations: Alaska, British Columbia.
- Headquarters: Juneau, Alaska, United States
- Key people: Sheldon Simmons, Alex Holden

Notes
- (1) IATA, ICAO codes were the same until the 1980s

Alaska Coastal Airlines was an airline in the United States. It was formed in 1939 as a result of the merger of Alaska Air Transport and Marine Airways. On April 1, 1962, Alaska Coastal Airlines merged with Ellis Air Lines, trading for a while as Alaska Coastal-Ellis Airlines. Alaska Coastal Airlines was taken over by Alaska Airlines in April 1968.

== History ==
Alaska Air Transport was formed by Sheldon Bruce "Shell" Simmons (October 8, 1908 – November 16, 1994) at Juneau in the summer of 1935 with one Stinson SM-2AC aircraft named Patco. Alaska Air Transport bought out Irving Airways in September 1936. Irving Airways had been started by Wilbur Irving at Juneau in the spring of 1936.

Marine Airways was formed by Alex Holden, Jim Davis and M E Monagle in Juneau in July 1936. Holden bought a Bellanca CH-300 Pacemaker NC196N in August 1936. In 1938, Simmons used Bellanca NC47M in the rescue of survivors of the Patterson, an oceangoing freighter which had run aground at Cape Fairweather, 150 miles northwest of Juneau. In 1939, Simmons and Holden joined forces, forming Alaskan Coastal Airways.

Ellis Air Lines was formed in Ketchikan in 1936 by Robert Edmund "Bob" Ellis (January 2, 1903 – May 8, 1994). At the time of the merger his fleet consisted of ten Grumman G-21 Goose amphibian aircraft.

In 1945, Simmons went to Vancouver, BC, and purchased a Grumman G-21 Goose, formerly in the service of the Royal Canadian Air Force On one occasion in the late 1960s, a woman had a baby in flight between Gustavus and Juneau.

Alaska Island Airways was acquired by Alaska Coastal Airlines in 1954.

== Destinations ==
=== Alaska ===
Angoon, Annette, Baranof, Cape Pole, Chatham, Craig, Duncan Canal, Edna Bay, Elfin Cove, Excursion Inlet, Funter, Gustavus, Haines, Hawk Inlet, Hollis, Hoonah, Hydaburg, Juneau, Kake, Kasaan, Ketchikan, Klawock, Pelican, Petersburg, Port Alexander, Port Armstrong, Point Baker, Port Walter, Rogers Point, Saginaw Bay, Sitka, Skagway, Steamboat Bay, Taku Lodge, Tenakee, Thorne Bay, Todd, Tokeen. Washington Bay, Wrangell.

=== British Columbia ===
Prince Rupert, Tulsequah.

== Accidents ==
- 1948 - Kingbird NC622V written off at Tulsequah, BC.
- November 14, 1952 - Vega NC49M destroyed by fire at Sitka.
- January 5, 1958 - Vega NC47M written off near Tanakee. Pilot killed, two passengers injured.
- January 20, 1964 - Goose N79914 accident at Petersburg.
- October 2, 1964 - Catalina N4936V written off at Otter Lake, flight attendant killed.
- August 21, 1966 - Goose N88820 written off near Juneau. Nine killed.
- August 30, 1967 - Goose N74588 accident at Prince Rupert, Canada.

== Fleet ==
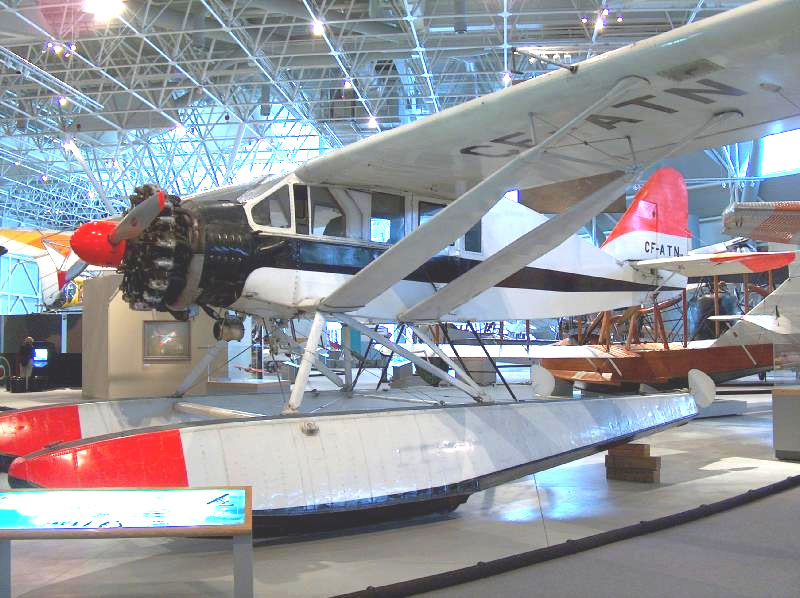
Former Alaska Coastal Airlines Bellanca Pacemaker CF-ATN preserved in Canada

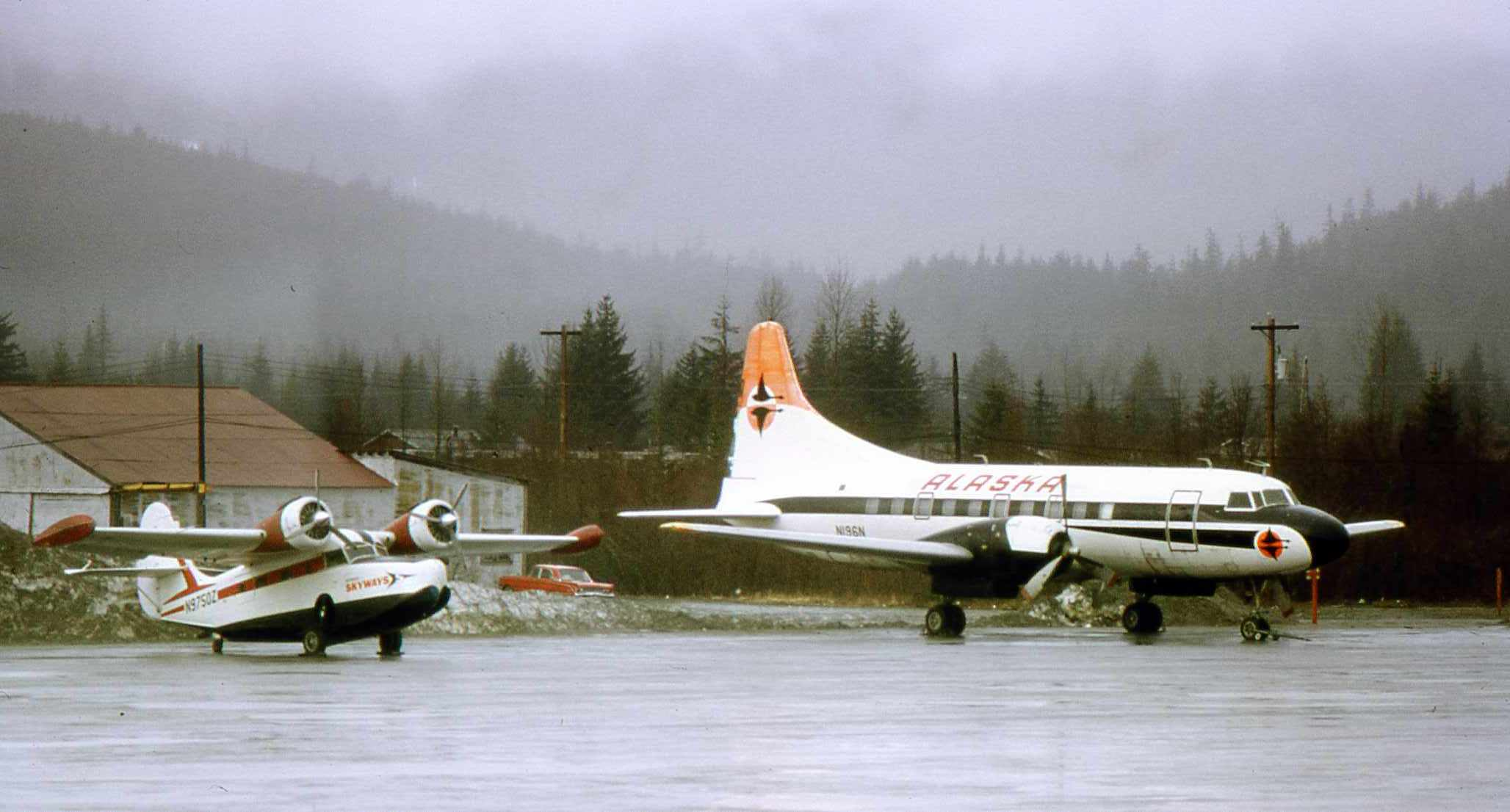
Alaska Coastal Airlines CV-240 N196N taken in 1972.

- Aeronca PC-3 NC16250 bought new from Aeronca 1 May 36 and sold after two accidents in Juneau and subsequent repairs on 30 Sep 39 to Mary Joyce of Taku Lodge, cancelled in CAA records 4 Aug 48 after letter from Miss Joyce that it was unlikely to fly again (Source; FAA file for NC16250)
- Bellanca CH-300 Pacemaker - one operated now preserved in the National Aviation Museum, Ottawa, Ontario, Canada.
- Cessna 180
- Cessna 185D - one operated
- Convair 240-5 - one operated
- Consolidated PBY Catalina- five operated
- Curtiss Kingbird D-3 - one operated
- Fairchild 24 - one operated
- Howard DGA
- Grumman G-21 Goose - 24 operated including aircraft converted to turboprop power ("Turbo-Goose")
- Lockheed Vega - two operated
- Piper J-3C-65 Cub - one operated in 1948
- Stinson SM2A - one operated
- Waco

== See also ==
- List of defunct airlines of the United States
