= Pelican Seaplane Base =

- IATA: PEC; ICAO: none; FAA LID: PEC

Summary
- Airport type: Public
- Owner: City of Pelican
- Serves: Pelican, Alaska
- Elevation AMSL: 0 ft / 0 m
- Coordinates: 57°57′19″N 136°14′11″W

Map
- Location of airport in Alaska

Runways
Direction	Length		Surface
Direction	ft	m	Surface
NW/SE	10,000	3,048	Water

Statistics (2006)
- Aircraft operations: 350
- Source: Federal Aviation Administration

Pelican Seaplane Base (IATA: PEC, FAA LID: PEC) is a public-use seaplane base located in and owned by the City of Pelican, on Chichagof Island in the Hoonah-Angoon Census Area of the U.S. state of Alaska. Scheduled airline service is subsidized by the Essential Air Service program.

The National Plan of Integrated Airport Systems for 2015-2019 categorized it as a general aviation airport based on 859 enplanements (passenger boardings) in 2012 (the commercial service category requires at least 2,500 enplanements per year). As per the Federal Aviation Administration, this airport had 744 enplanements in calendar year 2008, 550 in 2009, and 652 in 2010.

== Facilities and aircraft ==
Pelican Seaplane Base has one runway designated NW/SE which measures 10,000 by 2,000 feet (3,048 x 610 m). For the 12-month period ending December 31, 2006, the airport had 350 aircraft operations, an average of 29 per month: 86% air taxi and 14% general aviation.

== Airlines and destinations ==
Airlines	Destinations
Alaska Seaplanes	Juneau

=== Statistics ===
Carrier shares: January – December 2013
Carrier	Passengers (arriving and departing)
Alaska	1,630(100%)

Top domestic destinations: Jan. – Dec. 2013
Rank	City	Airport name & IATA code	Passengers	
Rank	City	Airport name & IATA code	2013	2012
1	Juneau, AK	Juneau International (JNU)	770	800
2	Elfin Cove, AK	Elfin Cove Seaplane Base (ELV)	60	<10

== See also ==
- List of airports in Alaska
