= Wrangell Airport =

Airport in Alaska, United States

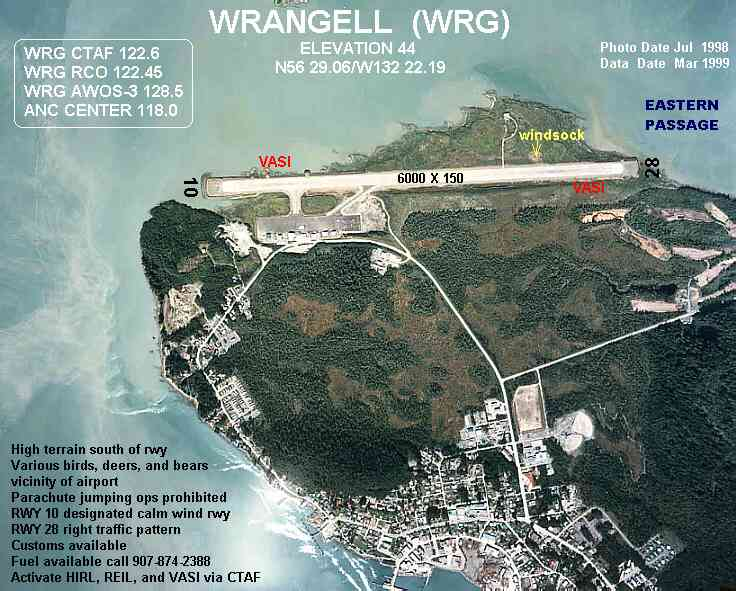
- IATA: WRG; ICAO: PAWG; FAA LID: WRG

Summary
- Airport type: Public
- Operator: State of Alaska DOT&PF - Southeast Region
- Serves: Wrangell, Alaska
- Elevation AMSL: 49 ft (15 m)
- Coordinates: 56°29′04″N 132°22′11″W

Map
- Location of airport in Alaska

Runways
Direction	Length		Surface
Direction	ft	m	Surface
10/28	5,999	1,828	Asphalt

Statistics (2012)
- Aircraft operations: 10,425
- Based aircraft: 11
- Source: Federal Aviation Administration

Wrangell Airport (IATA: WRG, ICAO: PAWG, FAA LID: WRG) is a state-owned public-use airport located one nautical mile (2 km) northeast of the central business district of Wrangell, a city and borough in the U.S. state of Alaska which has no road access to the outside world. Scheduled airline service is subsidized by the Essential Air Service program.

As per Federal Aviation Administration records, the airport had 10,601 passenger enplanements (boardings) in calendar year 2008, 10,790 in 2009, and 10,882 in 2010. It is included in the National Plan of Integrated Airport Systems for 2015–2019, which categorized it as a primary commercial service (nonhub) airport (more than 10,000 enplanements per year) based on 11,434 enplanements in 2012.

== Facilities and aircraft ==
Wrangell Airport has one runway designated 10/28 with an asphalt surface measuring 5,999 by 150 feet (1,828 x 46 m).

For the 12-month period ending January 13, 2012, the airport had 10,425 aircraft operations, an average of 28 per day: 59% air taxi, 34% general aviation, and 7% scheduled commercial. At that time there were 11 aircraft based at this airport: 91% single-engine and 9% helicopter.

== Airline and destinations ==
The following airline offers scheduled passenger service:

Airlines	Destinations
Alaska Airlines	Ketchikan, Petersburg
Alaska Seaplanes	Petersburg, Sitka

Alaska Airlines operates daily Boeing 737-700 passenger and Boeing 737-700 passenger/cargo jet service from the airport.

=== Top destinations ===
Busiest domestic routes out of WRG (August 2018 - July 2019)
Rank	City	Passengers	Carriers
1	Seattle/Tacoma, WA	4,570	Alaska
2	Ketchikan, AK	3,360	Alaska
3	Juneau, AK	3,350	Alaska
4	Anchorage, AK	2,510	Alaska
5	Petersburg, AK	380	Alaska

== See also ==
- List of airports in Alaska

== Other sources ==
- Essential Air Service documents (Docket OST-1998-4899) from the U.S. Department of Transportation:
  - Order 2004-5-5 (May 4, 2004): tentatively reselects Alaska Airlines, Inc., to provide subsidized essential air service at Cordova, Gustavus, Petersburg, Wrangell, and Yakutat (southeast) Alaska, for the period from October 1, 2003, through April 30, 2006, at an annual rate of $5,723,008.
  - Order 2006-3-20 (March 22, 2006): re-selecting Alaska Airlines, Inc., to provide subsidized essential air service at Cordova, Gustavus, Petersburg, Wrangell, and Yakutat (southeast) Alaska, for the period from May 1, 2006, through April 30, 2009.
  - Order 2009-2-3 (February 9, 2009): re-selecting Alaska Airlines, Inc., to provide essential air service (EAS) at Cordova, Gustavus, and Yakutat, for an annual subsidy rate of $5,793,201 and at Petersburg and Wrangell at an annual subsidy rate of $1,347,195, through April 30, 2011.
  - Order 2011-2-1 (February 1, 2011): re-selecting Alaska Airlines, Inc., to provide essential air service (EAS) at Cordova, Gustavus, and Yakutat, for an annual subsidy rate of $4,486,951 and at Petersburg and Wrangell at an annual subsidy rate of $3,415,987, from May 1, 2011, through April 30, 2013.
  - Order 2013-2-10 (February 11, 2013): re-selecting Alaska Airlines, Inc., to provide Essential Air Service (EAS) at Cordova, Gustavus, and Yakutat, Alaska, for $4,827,052 annual subsidy and at Petersburg and Wrangell at an annual subsidy rate of $3,476,579, from May 1, 2013, through April 30, 2015.
