= Petersburg James A. Johnson Airport =

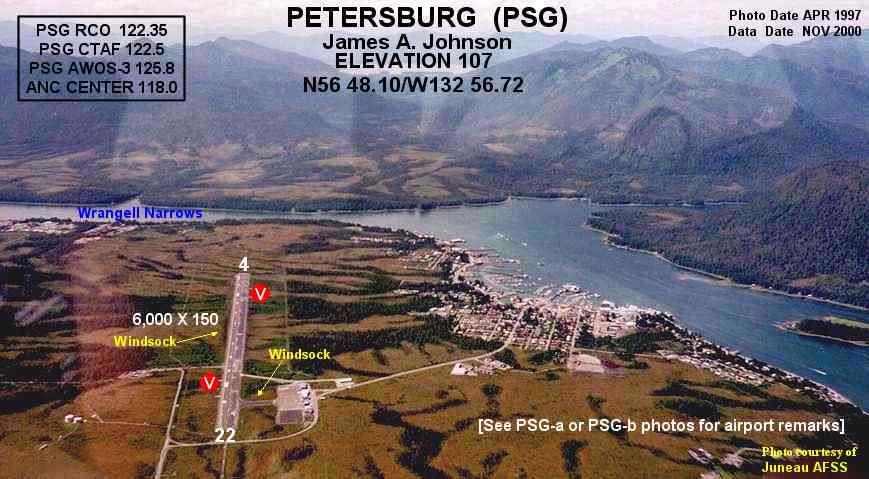
- IATA: PSG; ICAO: PAPG; FAA LID: PSG

Summary
- Airport type: Public
- Operator: State of Alaska DOT&PF - Southeast Region
- Serves: Petersburg, Alaska
- Elevation AMSL: 113 ft (34 m)
- Coordinates: 56°48′05″N 132°56′46″W

Map
- Location of airport in Alaska

Runways
Direction	Length		Surface
Direction	ft	m	Surface
5/23	6,400	1,951	Asphalt

Statistics (2017)
- Aircraft operations (year ending 12/1/2017): 13,492
- Based aircraft: 12
- Source: Federal Aviation Administration

Petersburg James A. Johnson Airport (IATA: PSG, ICAO: PAPG, FAA LID: PSG) is a state owned, public use airport located one nautical mile (2 km) southeast of the central business district of Petersburg, a city in the Petersburg Borough of the U.S. state of Alaska that has no road access to the outside world. Airline service is subsidized by the Essential Air Service program.

As per Federal Aviation Administration records, the airport had 24,921 passenger boardings (enplanements) in calendar year 2023, and 25,209 enplanements in 2024. It is included in the National Plan of Integrated Airport Systems for 2025-2029, which categorized it as a primary commercial service airport.

== Facilities and aircraft ==
Petersburg James A. Johnson Airport has one runway designated 5/23 with an asphalt surface measuring 6,400 by 150 feet (1,951 x 46 m).

For the 12-month period ending December 1, 2017, the airport had 13,492 aircraft operations, an average of 37 per day: 15% general aviation, 74% air taxi, 10% scheduled commercial, and <1% military. At that time there were 12 aircraft based at this airport: 10 single-engine, 1 multi-engine, and 1 helicopter.

== Airlines and destinations ==
=== Passenger ===
Airlines	Destinations
Alaska Airlines	Juneau, Wrangell
Alaska Seaplanes	Juneau, Kake, Sitka, Wrangell

Alaska Airlines operates daily Boeing 737-700 passenger and formerly operated Boeing 737-400 passenger/cargo Combi aircraft jet service from the airport.

=== Top destinations ===
Top ten busiest domestic routes out of PSG (July 2024 – June 2025)
Rank	City	Passengers	Carriers
1	Juneau, AK	9,330	Alaska
2	Seattle/Tacoma, WA	8,880	Alaska
3	Anchorage, AK	3,510	Alaska
4	Ketchikan, AK	2,440	Alaska
5	Wrangell, AK	460	Alaska

== See also ==
- List of airports in Alaska

== Other sources ==
- Essential Air Service documents (Docket OST-1998-4899) from the U.S. Department of Transportation:
  - Order 2004-5-5 (May 4, 2004): tentatively reselects Alaska Airlines, Inc., to provide subsidized essential air service at Cordova, Gustavus, Petersburg, Wrangell, and Yakutat (southeast) Alaska, for the period from October 1, 2003, through April 30, 2006, at an annual rate of $5,723,008.
  - Order 2006-3-20 (March 22, 2006): re-selecting Alaska Airlines, Inc., to provide subsidized essential air service at Cordova, Gustavus, Petersburg, Wrangell, and Yakutat (southeast) Alaska, for the period from May 1, 2006, through April 30, 2009.
  - Order 2009-2-3 (February 9, 2009): re-selecting Alaska Airlines, Inc., to provide essential air service (EAS) at Cordova, Gustavus, and Yakutat, for an annual subsidy rate of $5,793,201 and at Petersburg and Wrangell at an annual subsidy rate of $1,347,195, through April 30, 2011.
  - Order 2011-2-1 (February 1, 2011): re-selecting Alaska Airlines, Inc., to provide essential air service (EAS) at Cordova, Gustavus, and Yakutat, for an annual subsidy rate of $4,486,951 and at Petersburg and Wrangell at an annual subsidy rate of $3,415,987, from May 1, 2011, through April 30, 2013.
  - Order 2013-2-10 (February 11, 2013): re-selecting Alaska Airlines, Inc., to provide Essential Air Service (EAS) at Cordova, Gustavus, and Yakutat, Alaska, for $4,827,052 annual subsidy and at Petersburg and Wrangell at an annual subsidy rate of $3,476,579, from May 1, 2013, through April 30, 2015.
