= Haines Seaplane Base =

- IATA: none; ICAO: none; FAA LID: 3Z9

Summary
- Airport type: Public
- Owner: Haines Borough
- Serves: Haines, Alaska
- Elevation AMSL: 0 ft (0 m)
- Coordinates: 59°14′06″N 135°26′27″W

Map
- Location of airport in Alaska

Runways
| Direction | Length | | Surface |
| Direction | ft | m | Surface |
|---|---|---|---|
| N/S | 5,000 | 1,524 | Water |

Statistics (2006)
- Aircraft operations: 250
- Source: Federal Aviation Administration

Haines Seaplane Base (FAA LID: 3Z9) is a public-use seaplane base located in Haines, Alaska. It is owned by Haines Borough. It is included in the National Plan of Integrated Airport Systems for 2011–2015, which categorized it as a general aviation facility.

== Facilities and aircraft ==
Haines Seaplane Base has one seaplane landing area designated N/S which measures 5,000 by 4,000 feet (1,524 x 1,219 m). For the 12-month period ending December 31, 2006, the airport had 250 aircraft operations, an average of 20 per month: 60% general aviation and 40% air taxi.

== See also ==
- Haines Airport
- List of airports in Alaska
