= Kake Seaplane Base =

- IATA: KAE; ICAO: none; FAA LID: KAE

Summary
- Airport type: Public
- Owner: State of Alaska DOT&PF - Southeast Region
- Serves: Kake, Alaska
- Elevation AMSL: 0 ft (0 m)
- Coordinates: 56°58′23″N 133°56′44″W

Map
- Location of airport in Alaska

Runways
Direction	Length		Surface
Direction	ft	m	Surface
NW/SE	10,000	3,048	Water

Statistics (2006)
- Aircraft operations: 1,000
- Source: Federal Aviation Administration

Kake Seaplane Base (IATA: KAE, FAA LID: KAE) is a public-use seaplane base located in Kake, a city in the Petersburg Borough of the U.S. state of Alaska. Scheduled airline passenger service is subsidized by the U.S. Department of Transportation via the Essential Air Service program.

This airport is included in the National Plan of Integrated Airport Systems for 2015–2019, which categorized it as a general aviation airport based on 1,598 enplanements in 2012 (the commercial service category requires at least 2,500 enplanements per year). As per Federal Aviation Administration records, it had 1,564 passenger boardings (enplanements) in calendar year 2008, 1,255 enplanements in 2009, and 1,440 in 2010.

== Airlines and destinations ==
The following airline offers scheduled passenger service:

Airlines	Destinations
Alaska Seaplanes	Juneau, Petersburg, Sitka

=== Statistics ===
Carrier shares: January - December 2012
Carrier	Passengers (arriving and departing)
Excursions	3,010(100%)

Top domestic destinations: Jan. - Dec. 2012
Rank	City	Airport	Passengers
1	Juneau, AK	Juneau International Airport (JNU)	1,470

== See also ==
- Kake Airport
- List of airports in Alaska

== Other sources ==
- Essential Air Service documents (Docket DOT-OST-2008-0217) from the U.S. Department of Transportation:
  - 90-Day Notice (July 11, 2008): of L.A.B. Flying Service, Inc. intent to terminate unsubsidized essential air service at Kake, Alaska.
  - Order 2008-7-29 (July 25, 2008): requesting proposals by August 1, 2008, from carriers interested in providing essential air service (EAS) at Kake and Excursion Inlet, Alaska, for a two-year period, beginning when the carrier can inaugurate service, with or without subsidy. (On July 24, 2008, the Federal Aviation Administration revoked the operating certificate of LAB Flying Service, Inc., on an emergency basis.)
  - Order 2008-8-16 (August 15, 2008): selecting Alaska Juneau Aeronautics, Inc., d/b/a Wings of Alaska, Inc., to provide essential air service at Excursion Inlet and Kake, Alaska, at annual subsidy rates of $34,659 at Excursion Inlet and $314,302 at Kake, for the two-year period ending August 31, 2010.
  - Order 2010-8-9 (August 17, 2010): selecting Air Excursions, LLC to provide Essential Air Service (EAS) at Kake, Alaska, for a first-year subsidy rate of $213,405 and a second-year of $229,939 for the two-year period from September 1, 2010, to August 31, 2012.
  - Order 2012-9-8 (September 10, 2012): re-selecting Air Excursions, LLC to provide Essential Air Service (EAS) at Kake for a first-year annual subsidy of $163,621 and a second-year annual subsidy of $177,574. The airline will provide 14 weekly nonstop round trips to Juneau during the 21-week peak season and 7 weekly nonstop round trips during the 31-week off-peak season.
