= Ketchikan International Airport =

Airport in Alaska, United States

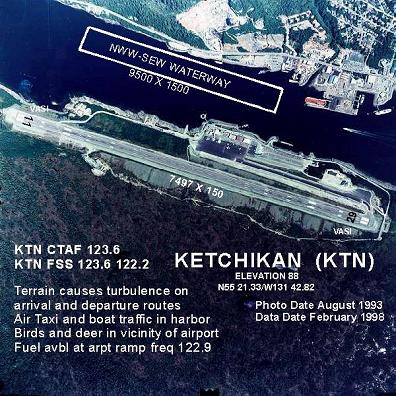
- IATA: KTN; ICAO: PAKT; FAA LID: KTN

Summary
- Airport type: Public
- Owner: State of Alaska DOT&PF – Southeastern Region
- Serves: Ketchikan, Alaska
- Elevation AMSL: 92 ft (28 m)
- Coordinates: 55°21′15″N 131°42′40″W

Map
- Location of airport in Alaska

Runways
Direction	Length		Surface
Direction	ft	m	Surface
11/29	7,500	2,286	Asphalt
WNW/ESE	9,500	2,896	Water

Statistics (2023)
- Aircraft operations: 14,394
- Based aircraft: 5
- Source: Federal Aviation Administration

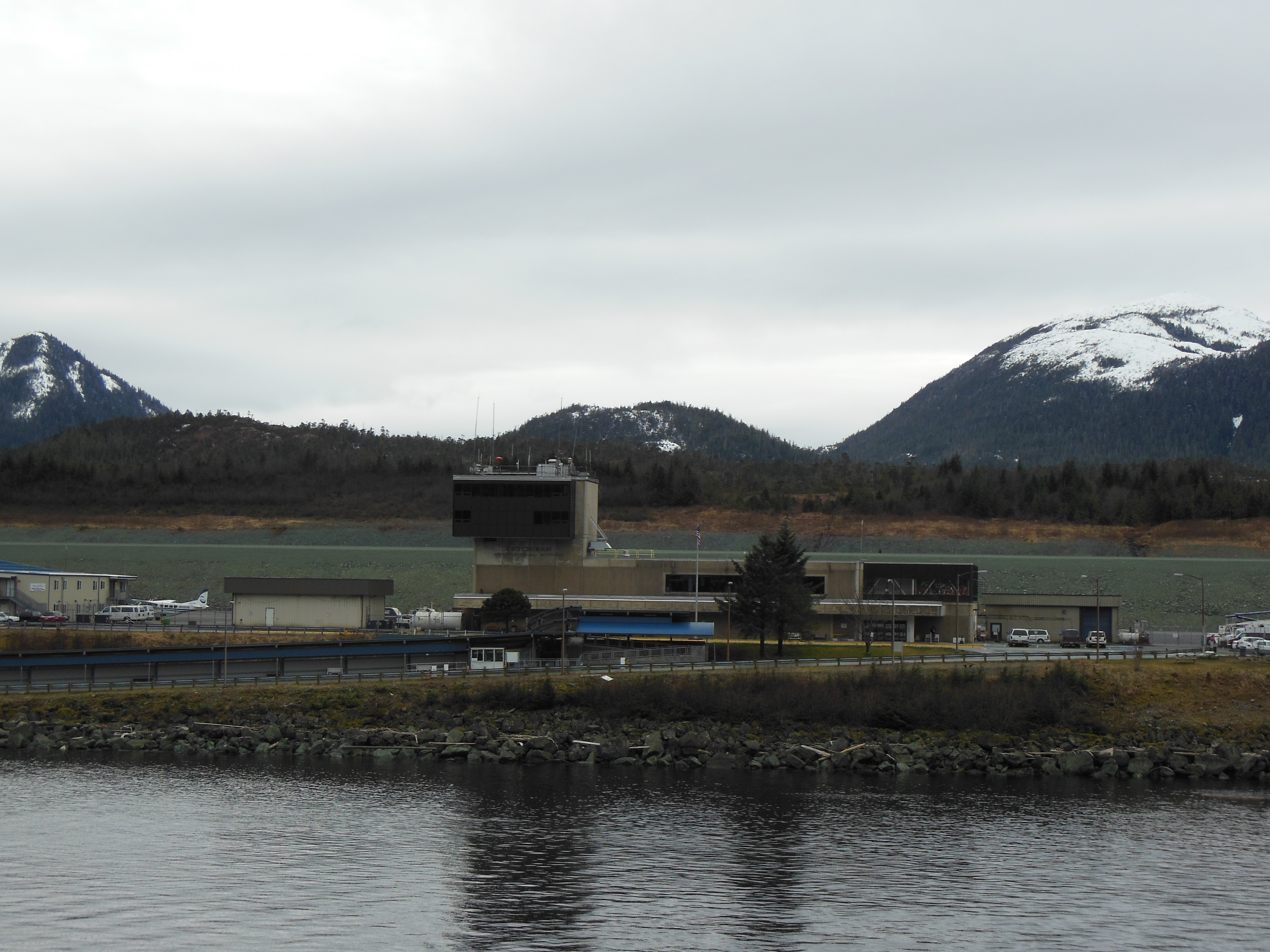
The airport terminal

Ketchikan International Airport (IATA: KTN, ICAO: PAKT, FAA LID: KTN) is a state-owned, public-use airport located one nautical mile (2 km) west of the central business district of Ketchikan, a city in Ketchikan Gateway Borough in Alaska, that has no direct road access to the outside world or to the airport. The airport is located on Gravina Island, just west of Ketchikan on the other side of the Tongass Narrows. Passengers must take a seven-minute ferry ride across the water to get to the airport from the town.

As per Federal Aviation Administration records, the airport had 148,645 passenger boardings (enplanements) in calendar year 2023, which was a 3.38% increase from 2022. It is included in the National Plan of Integrated Airport Systems for 2015–2019, which categorized it as a primary commercial service (nonhub) airport (more than 10,000 enplanements per year) based on 103,136 enplanements in 2012.

== History ==
Around the World War II era until the early 1970s, longer range land plane air service to Ketchikan including flights to Seattle were operated via an old military airfield located approximately 20 air miles to the south on Annette Island. Aircraft operated into the Annette Island Airport (ANN) for flights in the local southeast Alaska area included the Grumman Goose and Consolidated PBY Catalina with these amphibian aircraft being utilized to link the airport with the Ketchikan Harbor Seaplane Base. Longer range flights serving Annette Island were operated with Douglas DC-4 prop aircraft flown by Pan American World Airways during the 1940s followed by Douglas DC-6 and Boeing 377 Stratocruiser aircraft. Other service into the Annette Island Airport included Lockheed Constellation propliners flown by Pacific Northern Airlines during the 1950s and Boeing 707 jetliners flown by Pan Am in the early 1960s. In addition, Annette Island was served with Boeing 720 jetliners operated by Pacific Northern and successor Western Airlines later during the 1960s. Alaska Airlines also operated into Annette Island Airport prior to moving its jet service to Ketchikan International Airport with the opening of this new airfield.

The current airport was opened on August 4, 1973, and was dedicated on the following day. The airport opening was the culmination of an effort by local residents, a 1965 study by the Alaska State Division of Aviation, another study in 1967 choosing the current site on Gravina Island, and land clearing in 1969. One of the first airlines to serve the new airport was Alaska Airlines which inaugurated the first jet service from Seattle to Ketchikan International Airport on August 4, 1973, with a Boeing 720 jetliner. Alaska Air primarily operated Boeing 727-100, 727-200 and 737-200 jetliners (including 737 passenger/cargo Combi aircraft) into the airport before switching to later model Boeing 737 jets. Alaska Airlines has flown from the airport for over 40 years and also operated Grumman Goose and Super Catalina amphibian aircraft into the seaplane base serving Ketchikan prior to the opening of the airfield in 1973. Other airlines that operated jet service into the airport in the past included Wien Air Alaska and MarkAir with both air carriers flying Boeing 737 jets as well as Western Airlines operating Boeing 727-200 jetliners.

== Facilities and aircraft ==
Ketchikan International Airport covers an area of 2,600 acres (1,052 ha) at an elevation of 92 feet (27 m) above mean sea level. It has one asphalt paved runway designated 11/29 which measures 7,500 by 150 feet (2,286 x 46 m) and one water runway for seaplanes designated WNW/ESE which measures 9,500 by 1,500 feet (2896 x 457 m).

In 2004 Taxiway Bravo was added to facilitate taxiing to the end of the frequently used Runway 11 (the runway is located about 30 feet (9.1 m) higher than the apron further up the hillside, requiring long, gently sloped taxiways to either end). Before that taxiway, some smaller planes were allowed to use Taxiway Alpha to take off and land because it was not worthwhile to backtaxi on the actual runway. In addition, this allows the airport's system of taxiways to be used by more than one plane as large as a Boeing 737-900 at once.

For the 12-month period ending January 31, 2019, the airport had 15,959 aircraft operations, an average of 44 per day: 61% air taxi, 33% scheduled commercial, 4% general aviation, and <1% military. At that time there were five aircraft based at this airport: three single-engine, one multi-engine, and one jet.

== Ketchikan International Airport Ferry ==
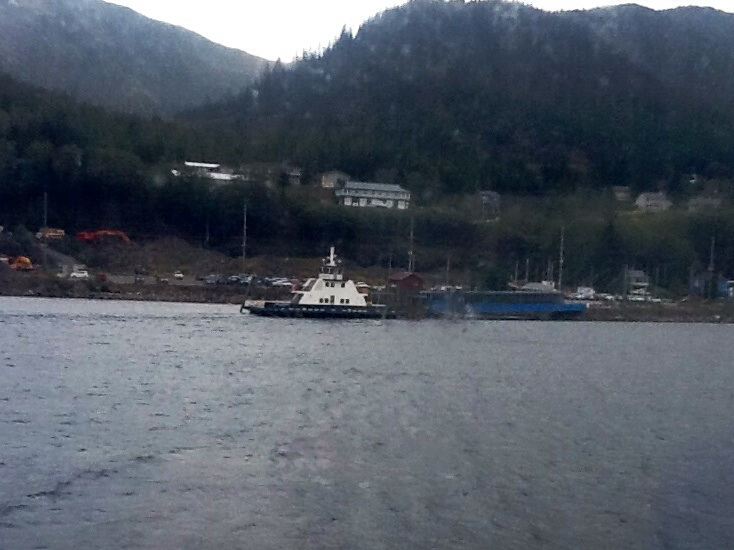
One of the two ferries loading passengers in Ketchikan

Because the international airport is on an island separated from Ketchikan, a ferry connects the airport to the city, crossing the Tongass Narrows with passengers and vehicles. There are two ferries serving the route between Gravina Island (the airport) and Revillagigedo Island (the city of Ketchikan). There are two departures in every hour in each direction.

Ketchikan and Revillagigedo Island have no land-based connections to the mainland. However, it lies on Alaska Route 7, the land route whose sections are connected by the Alaska Marine Highway.

=== Proposed road access ===
A proposed bridge, referred to by its detractors as the "bridge to nowhere" despite its linking the city and its airport, was designed with an estimated cost of $398 million to replace the ferry. After protracted attention to the cost of the bridge, the United States Congress reversed its decision to fund the bridge in 2007. The money was transferred to the state of Alaska to determine the use of the funds.

== Airlines and destinations ==
=== Passenger ===
Airlines	Destinations
Alaska Airlines	Juneau, Seattle/Tacoma, Sitka, Wrangell
Island Air Express	Klawock

Alaska Airlines flies Boeing 737-700 and 737-800 jetliners into the airport. Alaska Airlines' flights include Boeing 737-700 passenger as well as converted all-cargo Boeing 737-700F jet freighter service.

=== Charter airlines ===
- Family Air Tours
- Misty Fjords Air
- Pacific Airways
- SeaWind Aviation
- Southeast Aviation
- Taquan Air

== Statistics ==
Top airlines at KTN (October 2024 – September 2025)
Rank	Airline	Passengers	Percent of market share
1	Alaska Airlines	265,000	90.63%
2	Island Air Express	27,040	9.24%
3	Alaska Seaplanes	380	0.13%

=== Top destinations ===
Busiest domestic routes out of KTN (October 2024 – September 2025)
Rank	City	Airport	Passengers	Carriers
1	Seattle / Tacoma, WA	Seattle-Tacoma International Airport	91,750	Alaska
2	Juneau, AK	Juneau International Airport	15,390	Alaska
3	Anchorage, AK	Ted Stevens Anchorage International Airport	14,210	Island Air Express
4	Klawock, AK	Klawock Airport	13,970	Alaska
5	Sitka, AK	Sitka Rocky Gutierrez Airport	5,860	Alaska
6	Wrangell, AK	Wrangell Airport	3,280	Alaska
7	Petersburg, AK	Petersburg James A. Johnson Airport	2,070	

== Accidents and incidents ==
- On April 5, 1976, Alaska Airlines Flight 60, a Boeing 727-100 (N124AS) overran the southern end of the runway, in rainy weather. The aircraft landed long and too fast. Combined with the sluggish braking from the weather, the pilot decided to perform a go around, even through this was not permitted after the thrust reversers had been deployed. The thrust reversers on the engines didn't fully disengage, so the engines did not produce enough thrust to allow a takeoff. The pilot aborted the takeoff and the aircraft overran the runway by 700 feet (210 m). One of the 50 passengers on board died. The 727 trijet subsequently caught fire and was destroyed.
- An Aero Vodochody L-39MS high performance jet trainer crashed during approach on January 25, 2006. The aircraft attempted to land in blowing snow and poor visibility, but struck the water three times before regaining some altitude. Witnesses reported hearing the jet's engines stop, then watching it descend into a large lot. The pilot ejected just before the plane crashed into an occupied mobile home, but struck a tree while in his ejection seat.

== See also ==
- Ketchikan Harbor Seaplane Base (IATA: WFB, FAA LID: 5KE)
- List of airports in Alaska
