= Kake Airport =

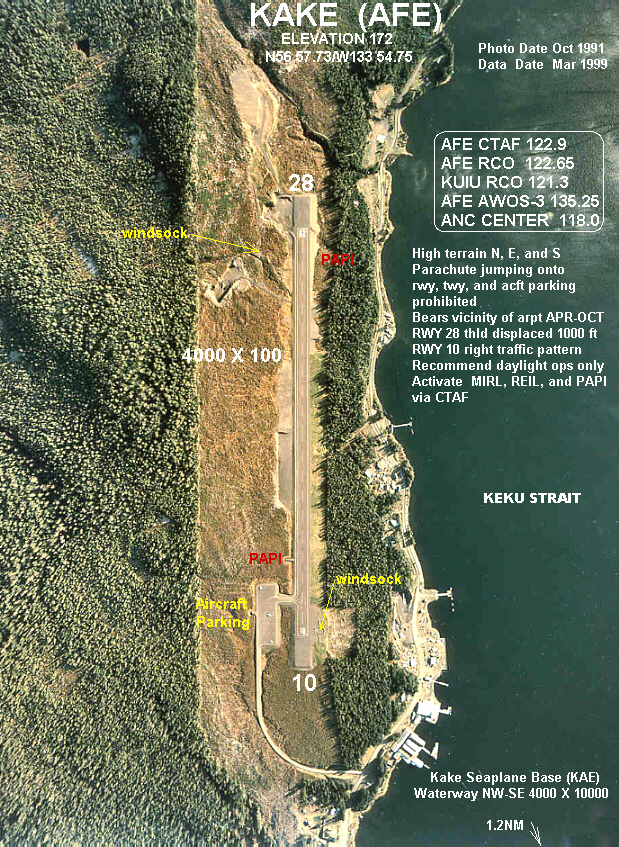
- IATA: AFE; ICAO: PAFE; FAA LID: AFE

Summary
- Airport type: Public
- Owner: State of Alaska DOT&PF - Southeast Region
- Serves: Kake, Alaska
- Elevation AMSL: 172 ft (52 m)
- Coordinates: 56°57′41″N 133°54′37″W

Map
- Location of airport in Alaska

Runways
Direction	Length		Surface
Direction	ft	m	Surface
11/29	4,000	1,219	Asphalt

Statistics (2006)
- Aircraft operations: 4,600
- Source: Federal Aviation Administration

Kake Airport (ICAO: PAFE, FAA LID: AFE) is a state-owned public-use airport located one nautical mile (2 km) southeast of the central business district of Kake, a city in the Petersburg Borough of the U.S. state of Alaska. This airport is included in the National Plan of Integrated Airport Systems for 2011–2015, which categorized it as a general aviation airport.

Scheduled airline service is available at Kake Seaplane Base (IATA: KAE, FAA LID: KAE).

== Facilities and aircraft ==
Kake Airport has one runway designated 11/29 with an asphalt surface measuring 4,000 by 100 feet (1,219 x 30 m). For the 12-month period ending December 31, 2006, the airport had 4,600 aircraft operations, an average of 12 per day.

== See also ==
- Kake Seaplane Base
- List of airports in Alaska
