= Haines Airport =

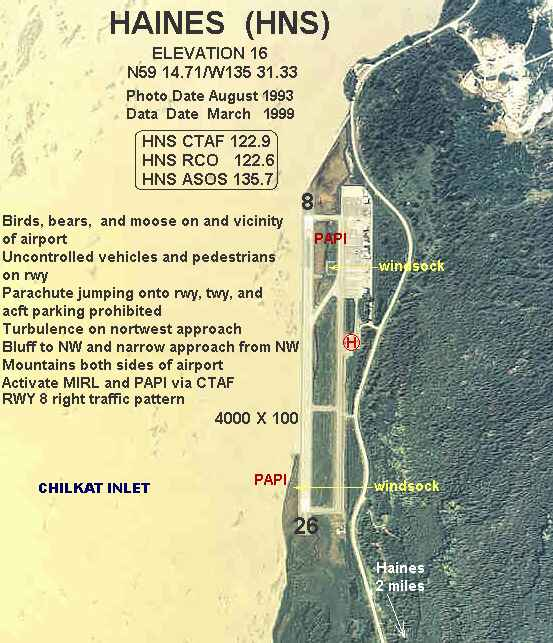
- IATA: HNS; ICAO: PAHN; FAA LID: HNS

Summary
- Airport type: Public
- Owner: State of Alaska DOT&PF - Southeastern Region
- Serves: Haines, Alaska
- Elevation AMSL: 15 ft (4.6 m)
- Coordinates: 59°14′38″N 135°31′25″W

Map
- Location of airport in Alaska

Runways
Direction	Length		Surface
Direction	ft	m	Surface
8/26	4,000	1,219	Asphalt

Statistics (2006)
- Aircraft operations: 5,700
- Source: Federal Aviation Administration

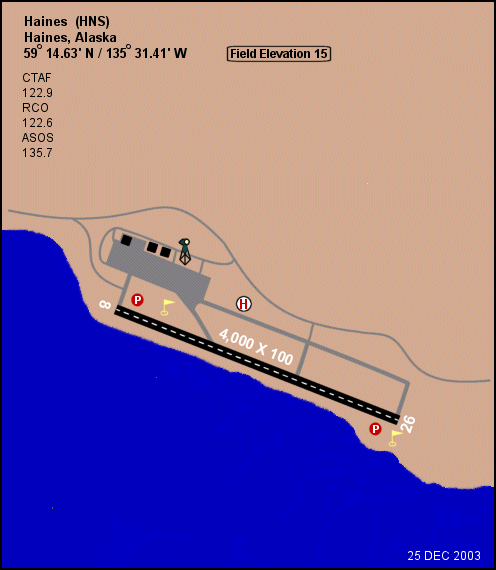
Diagram of Haines Airport (HNS)

Haines Airport (IATA: HNS, ICAO: PAHN, FAA LID: HNS) is a state-owned public-use airport located three nautical miles (6 km) west of the central business district of Haines, a city in the Haines Borough in the U.S. state of Alaska. It is the primary airport serving the Haines, Klukwan, Haines Borough area and is situated on the Haines Highway, directly adjacent to the Chilkat River.

This airport is included in the National Plan of Integrated Airport Systems for 2015–2019, which categorized it as a primary commercial service (nonhub) airport based on 10,093 enplanements in 2012. As per Federal Aviation Administration records, the airport had 7,035 passenger boardings (enplanements) in calendar year 2008, 7,099 enplanements in 2009, and 9,534 in 2010.

== Facilities and aircraft ==
Haines Airport covers an area of 124 acres (50 ha) at an elevation of 15 feet (5 m) above mean sea level. It has one runway designated 8/26 with an asphalt surface measuring 4,000 by 100 feet (1,219 x 30 m).

For the 12-month period ending December 31, 2006, the airport had 5,700 aircraft operations, an average of 15 per day: 79% air taxi, 19% general aviation, and 2% military.

== Airlines and destinations ==
The following airlines offer scheduled passenger service at this airport:

Airlines	Destinations
Alaska Seaplanes	Juneau, Skagway

== Statistics ==
Carrier shares for August 2010 - July 2011
Carrier	Passengers (arriving and departing)
SeaPort	7,650(40.96%)
Wings of Alaska	7,640(40.92%)
Excursions	3,390(18.12%)

Top domestic destinations (August 2010 - July 2011)
Rank	City	Airport	Passengers
1	Juneau, AK	JNU	8,000
2	Skagway, AK	SGY	2,000

== See also ==
- Haines Seaplane Base
- List of airports in Alaska
