= Elfin Cove Seaplane Base =

- IATA: ELV; ICAO: PAEL; FAA LID: ELV

Summary
- Airport type: Public
- Owner: State of Alaska DOT&PF - Southeast Region
- Serves: Elfin Cove, Alaska
- Elevation AMSL: 0 ft (0 m)
- Coordinates: 58°11′43″N 136°20′51″W

Map
- Location of airport in Alaska ELV (the United States)

Runways
Direction	Length		Surface
Direction	ft	m	Surface
NW/SE	10,000	3,048	Water

Statistics (2015)
- Aircraft operations: 400
- Based aircraft: 0
- Passengers: 960
- Freight: 63,000 lbs
- Source: Federal Aviation Administration; Source: Bureau of Transportation

Elfin Cove Seaplane Base (IATA: ELV, ICAO: PAEL, FAA LID: ELV) is a state-owned public-use seaplane base located in Elfin Cove, on Chichagof Island in the Hoonah-Angoon Census Area of the U.S. state of Alaska. Scheduled airline service is subsidized by the Essential Air Service program.

The National Plan of Integrated Airport Systems for 2011–2015 categorized it as a general aviation facility (the commercial service category requires at least 2,500 enplanements per year). As per the Federal Aviation Administration, this airport had 196 passenger boardings (enplanements) in calendar year 2008, 265 in 2009, and 305 in 2010.

== Facilities and aircraft ==
Elfin Cove Seaplane Base has one seaplane landing area designated NW/SE which measures 10,000 by 1,500 feet (3,048 x 457 m). For the 12-month period ending December 31, 2006, the airport had 500 aircraft operations, an average of 41 per month: 60% air taxi and 40% general aviation.

== Airlines and destinations ==
Airlines	Destinations
Alaska Seaplanes	Juneau

=== Statistics ===
Carrier shares: January – December 2016
Carrier	Passengers (arriving and departing)
Alaska Seaplanes	960(100.00%)

Top domestic destinations: Jan. – Dec. 2016
Rank	City	Airport	Passengers
1	(Alaska) Juneau, AK	Juneau International Airport	500

== See also ==
- List of airports in Alaska
