= Juneau International Airport =

International airport serving Juneau, Alaska, United States

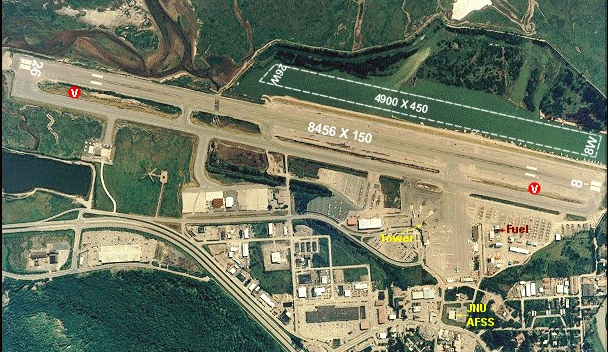
- IATA: JNU; ICAO: PAJN; FAA LID: JNU; WMO: 70381

Summary
- Airport type: Public
- Owner: City of Juneau
- Serves: Juneau, Alaska
- Elevation AMSL: 25 ft (7.6 m)
- Coordinates: 58°21′18″N 134°34′35″W
- Website: juneau.org/airport

Maps
- FAA airport diagram
- Interactive map of Juneau International Airport

Runways
Direction	Length		Surface
Direction	ft	m	Surface
8/26	8,857	2,700	Asphalt
8W/26W	4,600	1,402	Water

Statistics (2024)
- Passengers: 730,000
- Scheduled departures: 13,915
- Total freight: 27,000,000 lbs.
- Source: Federal Aviation Administration

Juneau International Airport (IATA: JNU, ICAO: PAJN, FAA LID: JNU) is a city-owned, public-use airport and seaplane base located seven nautical miles (8 mi, 13 km) northwest of the central business district of Juneau, a city and borough in the U.S. state of Alaska which has no direct road access. The airport is a regional hub for all air travel, from bush carriers to major U.S. air carriers such as Alaska Airlines.

The National Plan of Integrated Airport Systems for 2015-2019 categorized it as a primary commercial service (nonhub) airport based on 353,048 enplanements (boardings) in 2012. As per the Federal Aviation Administration, the airport had 378,741 passenger boardings in calendar year 2008, 337,038 in 2009, and 344,057 in 2010.

== History ==
During World War II, Juneau Airport was used by the United States Army Air Forces as a transport link between the combat bases being established in the Aleutians and airfields in the mainland United States. It was also used by Air Transport Command and facilitated the transport of Lend-Lease aircraft to the Soviet Union via Nome (Marks Army Airfield).

=== Historical airline service ===
Pan American World Airways (Pan Am) was one of the first major airlines to serve Juneau. In 1947, Pan Am was operating daily Douglas DC-4 propliner service to Seattle via a stop at the Annette Island Airport, which served Ketchikan at the time and also flew DC-4 service twice a week nonstop to Whitehorse in the Yukon Territory of Canada with continuing, no change of plane service to Fairbanks, Galena and Nome in Alaska. Pan Am later operated Douglas DC-6B and Boeing 377 Stratocruiser aircraft into the airport. During the 1950s, Pacific Northern Airlines (PNA, the successor of Woodley Airways) served the airport with Douglas DC-4 and Lockheed Constellation propliners with daily service to Seattle with a stop at Annette Island as well as nonstop to Anchorage and Yakutat and direct to Cordova in Alaska.

The jet age arrived in Juneau during the early 1960s. In 1963, Pan Am was operating daily Boeing 707 jetliner flights to Seattle via a stop at Annette Island. By 1965, Pacific Northern was operating Boeing 720 jets nonstop to Seattle, Anchorage and Annette Island. In 1967, Pacific Northern was acquired by and merged into Western Airlines, which continued to operate jet service to the airport. By 1968, Western was operating daily nonstop Boeing 720B jet service to Seattle, Anchorage and Annette Island with one stop direct service to Los Angeles. By 1969, Alaska Airlines was operating Boeing 727-100 jet service into the airport on a daily basis with a round trip route of Seattle - Sitka - Juneau - Yakutat - Cordova - Anchorage - Unalakleet - Nome - Kotzebue. Alaska Air has served Juneau for over 45 years and primarily operated Boeing 727-100, 727-200 and 737-200 jetliners into the airport (including the Boeing 737-200 passenger/freight Combi aircraft) in addition to Boeing 720 jetliners before switching to later model Boeing 737 jets. Besides operating jet service into Juneau, Alaska Airlines also flew smaller prop and turboprop aircraft from the airport in the past including the Convair 240, de Havilland Canada DHC-6 Twin Otter and two versions of the Grumman Goose amphibian aircraft, being a piston powered model and a turboprop version with the latter being named the "Turbo-Goose" by the airline. Alaska Airlines began serving Juneau during the late 1960s after its acquisition of two local air service carriers, Alaska Coastal Airlines, which was based in Juneau, and Cordova Airlines.

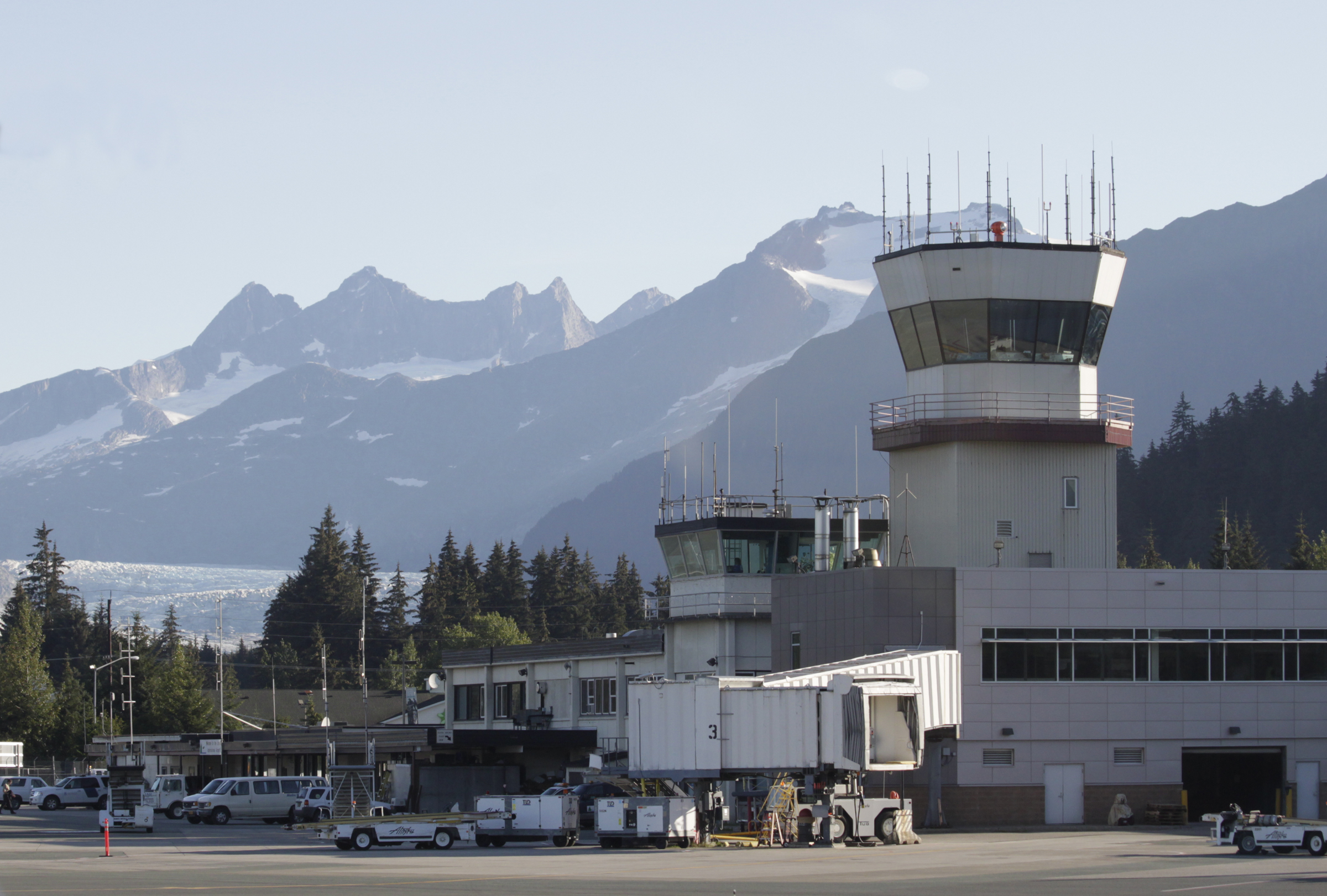
Closeup view of the airport's main terminal, including both older and newer control towers; Mendenhall Glacier is seen in the background

Other air carriers which served Juneau over the years included Wien Air Alaska and MarkAir, which had both been based in Alaska. Western Airlines also returned to Juneau after ceasing service during the early 1970s. In 1968, Wien was operating Fairchild F-27 turboprop flights into the airport three days a week on a route of Juneau - Whitehorse - Fairbanks. By 1977, Wien was flying Boeing 737-200 jet service twice a week from the airport on a Juneau - Whitehorse - Fairbanks - Anchorage route and by 1979 the airline was operating daily nonstop 737-200 jet flights to Seattle and Anchorage. During the early and mid 1980s, Western was operating daily nonstop Boeing 727-200 service to Seattle. After its acquisition of and merger with Western in 1987, Delta Air Lines continued to serve Juneau with daily nonstop Boeing 727-200 flights to Seattle and direct, one stop service to Los Angeles into the early 1990s.

In 1995, MarkAir operated daily nonstop Boeing 737-400 jet service to Seattle and Anchorage. In 2014, Delta Air Lines returned to Juneau offering first seasonal, and then year round service before leaving the market again at the end of 2016 and now serves Juneau on a seasonal basis. Delta entering the market to compete with Alaska Air resulted in fares to Seattle being reduced almost by half.

== Facilities and aircraft ==
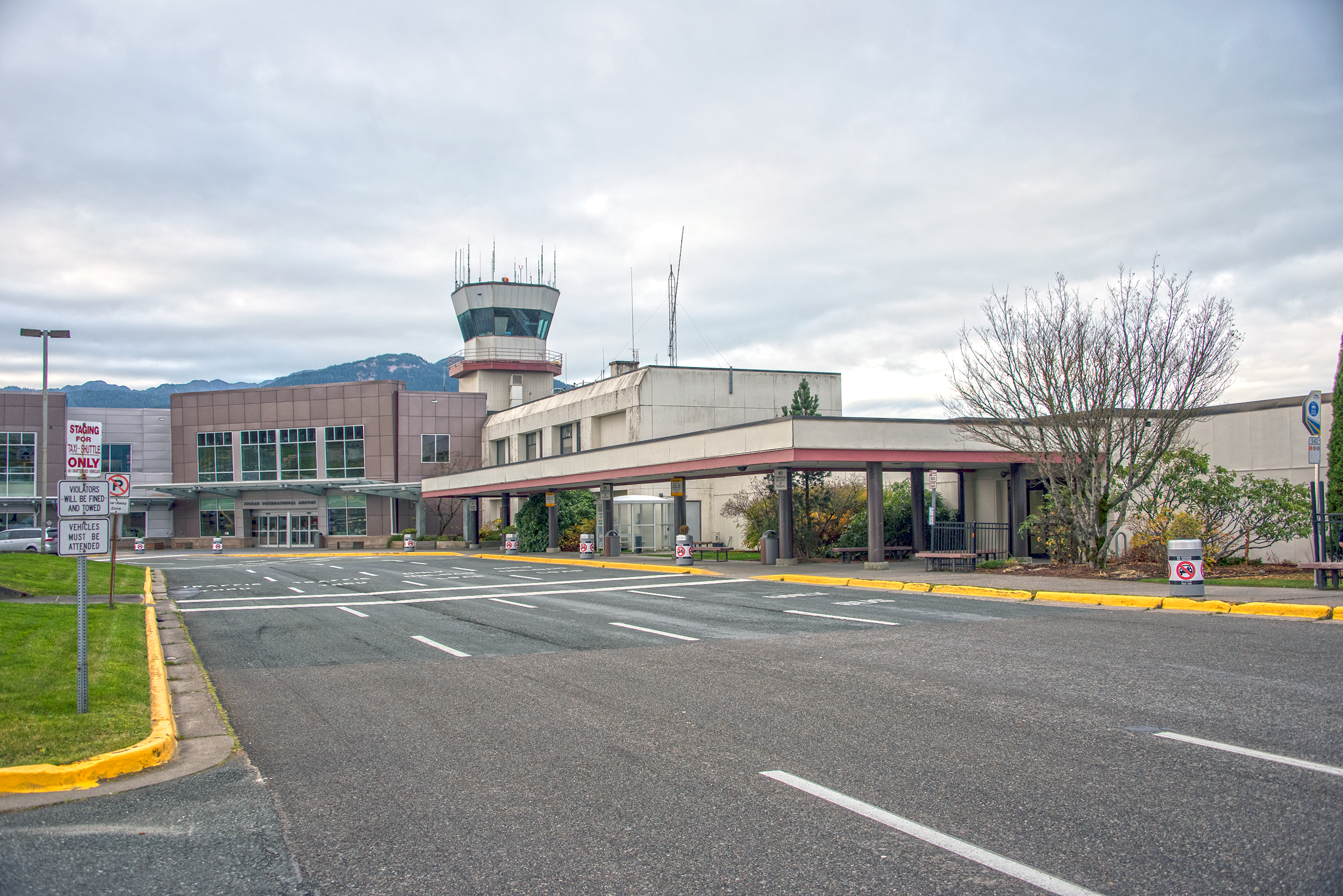
New and old terminals at Juneau International Airport

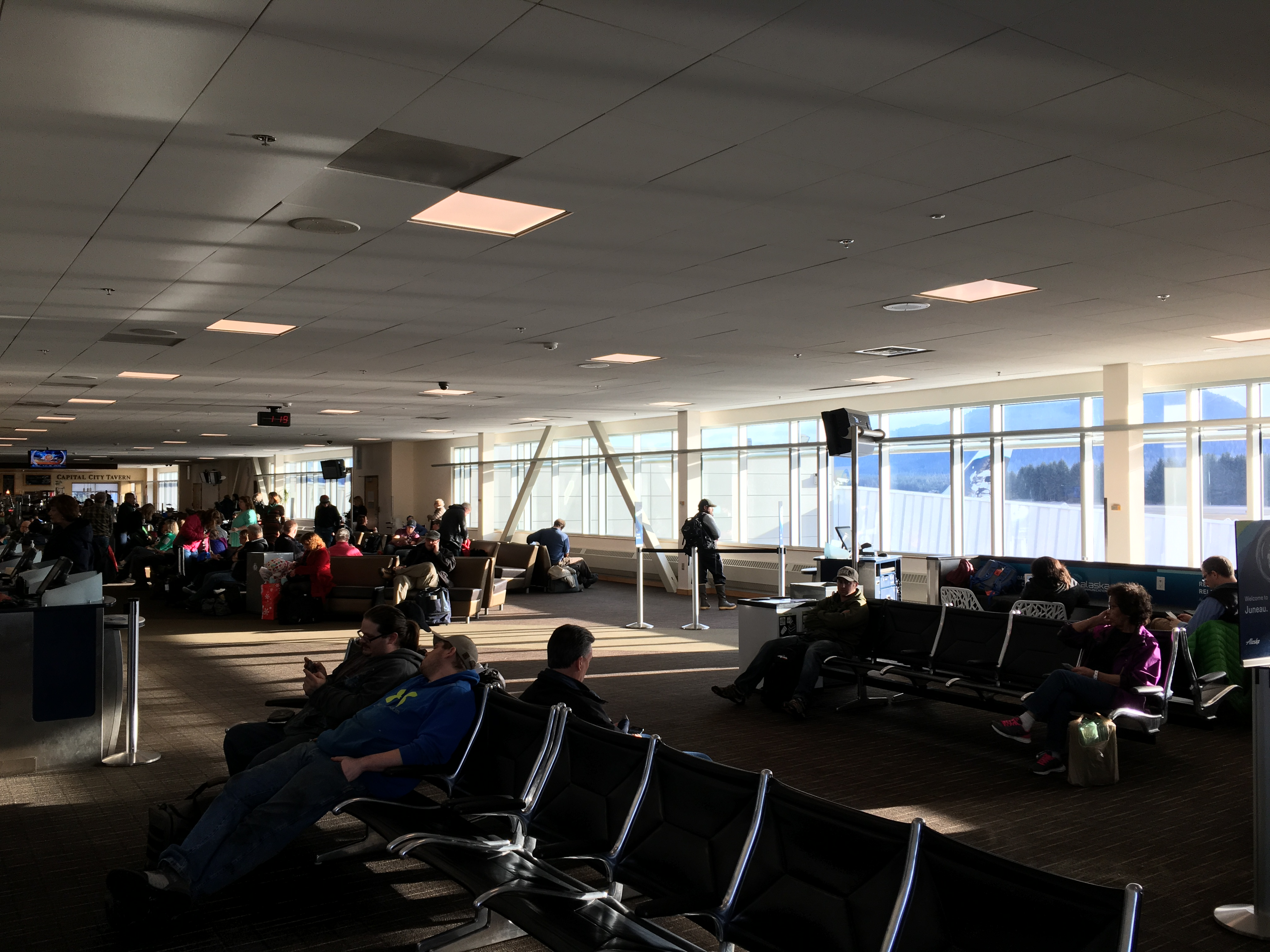
The main passenger terminal at Juneau International Airport

Juneau International Airport covers an area of 662 acres (268 ha) at an elevation of 25 feet (8 m) above mean sea level. It has one runway designated 8/26 with an asphalt surface measuring 8,857 by 150 feet (2,700 x 46 m). It has one seaplane landing area designated 8W/26W, which measures 4,600 by 150 feet (1,402 x 46 m).

For the 12-month period ending December 31, 2017, the airport had 108,885 aircraft operations, an average of 298 per day: 79% air taxi, 12% general aviation, 8% scheduled commercial, and <1% military. At the time 275 aircraft were based at the airport: 87% single-engine, 1% multi-engine, <1% jet, 10% helicopter, and 1% military.

== Airlines and destinations ==
Aside from providing passenger service, Alaska Airlines operates Boeing 737-700 jet freighter cargo flight service into Juneau.

=== Passenger ===
Airlines	Destinations
Alaska Airlines	Anchorage, Ketchikan, Petersburg, Seattle/Tacoma, Sitka, Yakutat; Seasonal: Gustavus
Alaska Seaplanes	Angoon, Elfin Cove, Excursion Inlet, Gustavus, Haines, Hoonah, Kake, Klawock, Pelican, Petersburg, Sitka, Skagway, Tenakee Springs
Delta Air Lines	Seasonal: Seattle/Tacoma
Ward Air	Excursion Inlet; Charter: Chatham, Funter Bay

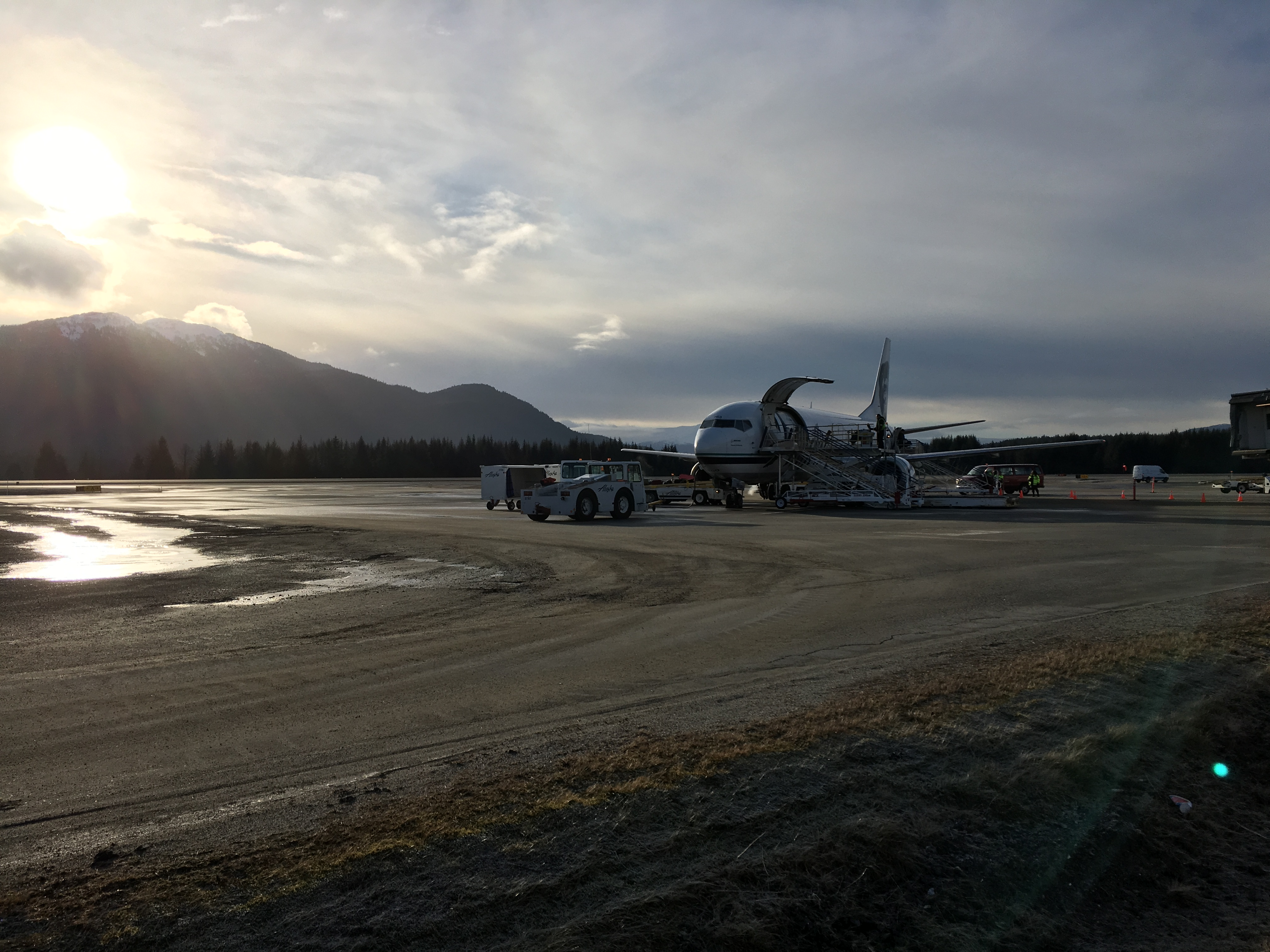
An Alaska Airlines Boeing 737-400C being loaded with cargo at Juneau International Airport

== Statistics ==
=== Top destinations ===
Busiest domestic routes from JNU (July 2024 – June 2025)
Rank	City	Passengers	Carriers
1	Seattle/Tacoma, Washington	189,710	Alaska, Delta
2	Anchorage, Alaska	80,580	Alaska
3	Sitka, Alaska	24,650	Alaska, Alaska Seaplanes
4	Ketchikan, Alaska	17,060	Alaska
5	Petersburg, Alaska	9,880	Alaska, Alaska Seaplanes
6	Gustavus, Alaska	9,430	Alaska, Alaska Seaplanes
7	Haines, Alaska	6,470	Alaska Seaplanes
8	Hoonah, Alaska	5,170	Alaska Seaplanes
9	Skagway, Alaska	4,280	Alaska Seaplanes
10	Yakutat, Alaska	3,460	Alaska

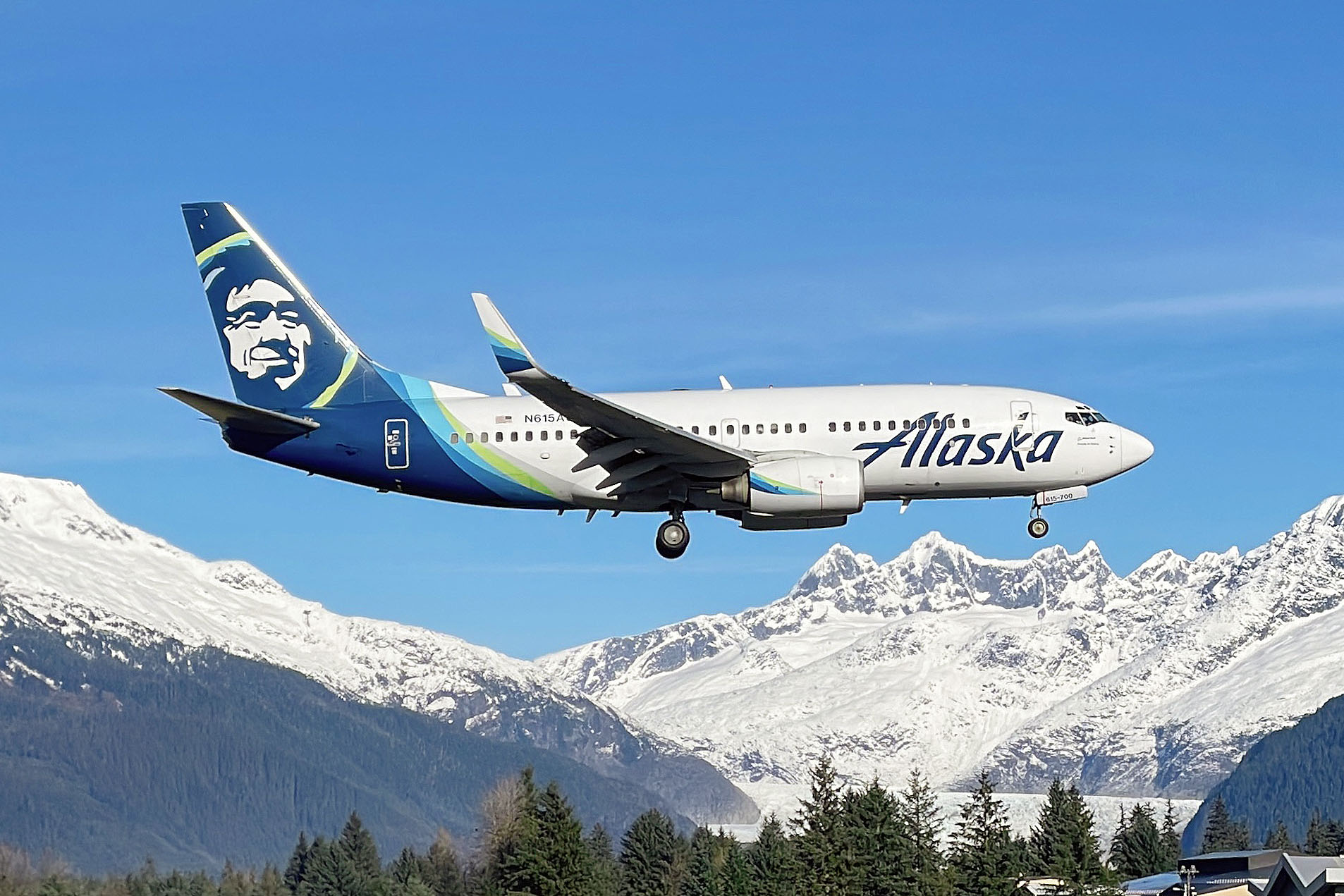
An Alaska Airlines Boeing 737-700 landing at Juneau International Airport

=== Airline Market Share ===
Top airlines at JNU (July 2024 – June 2025)
Rank	Airline	Passengers	Percent of market share
1	Alaska Airlines	636,000	87.99%
2	Kalinin Aviation	49,660	6.87%
3	Delta Air Lines	29,640	4.10%
4	Air Excursions	7,590	1.05%

== Accidents and incidents ==
- On September 4, 1971, Alaska Airlines Flight 1866, a Boeing 727-100, crashed into the easterly slope of a canyon in the Chilkat Range of the Tongass National Forest while on approach to Juneau International Airport. All 111 passengers and crew on board were killed. At the time, it was the worst single airplane air disaster in United States history.

== See also ==
- Alaska World War II Army Airfields
- List of airports in Alaska
