= Elfin Cove, Alaska =

Elfin Cove, Alaska X̱’óot’k’
- Census-designated place
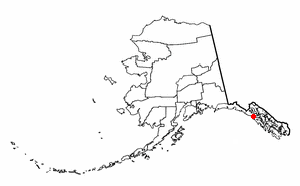
- Location of Elfin Cove, Alaska
- Coordinates: 58°11′56″N 136°21′19″W
- Country: United States
- State: Alaska
- Census Area: Hoonah-Angoon

Government
  - State senator: Bert Stedman (R)
  - State rep.: Rebecca Himschoot (I)

Area
  - Total: 204.21 sq mi (528.91 km^{2})
  - Land: 168.35 sq mi (436.03 km^{2})
  - Water: 35.86 sq mi (92.88 km^{2})
- Elevation: 220 ft (67 m)

Population (2020)
  - Total: 24
  - Density: 0.16/sq mi (0.06/km^{2})
- Time zone: UTC-9 (Alaska (AKST))
  - Summer (DST): UTC-8 (AKDT)
- ZIP code: 99825
- Area code: 907
- FIPS code: 02-22140
- GNIS feature ID: 1401787

Elfin Cove (Lingít: X̱’óot’k’) is a census-designated place (CDP) near the northwestern corner of Chichagof Island in Hoonah-Angoon Census Area, Alaska, United States. As of the 2020 census, Elfin Cove had a population of 24.

== Geography ==
Elfin Cove is located off Cross Sound on Chichagof Island at coordinates 58°11′56″N 136°21′19″W (58.198786, -136.355358). The CDP occupies the northern end of the Inian Peninsula; the actual settlement of Elfin Cove within the CDP, and its namesake harbor, are on the western side of the peninsula.

According to the United States Census Bureau, the CDP has a total area of 10.4 square miles (26.9 km^{2}), of which 10.2 square miles (26.4 km^{2}) are land and 0.2 square miles (0.5 km^{2}), or 1.73%, are water.

== Climate ==
According to the Köppen climate classification system, Elfin Cove has an oceanic climate (Cfb).

Climate data for Elfin Cove, Alaska (1991–2020 normals, extremes 1975–present)
| Month | Jan | Feb | Mar | Apr | May | Jun | Jul | Aug | Sep | Oct | Nov | Dec | Year |
|---|---|---|---|---|---|---|---|---|---|---|---|---|---|
| Record high °F (°C) | 55 (13) | 57 (14) | 58 (14) | 69 (21) | 75 (24) | 80 (27) | 78 (26) | 80 (27) | 74 (23) | 64 (18) | 54 (12) | 52 (11) | 80 (27) |
| Mean maximum °F (°C) | 45.3 (7.4) | 45.3 (7.4) | 47.4 (8.6) | 56.4 (13.6) | 64.6 (18.1) | 68.4 (20.2) | 68.1 (20.1) | 68.8 (20.4) | 63.8 (17.7) | 54.7 (12.6) | 47.8 (8.8) | 45.7 (7.6) | 73.1 (22.8) |
| Mean daily maximum °F (°C) | 36.1 (2.3) | 37.7 (3.2) | 39.6 (4.2) | 46.0 (7.8) | 51.9 (11.1) | 55.8 (13.2) | 58.1 (14.5) | 59.1 (15.1) | 55.8 (13.2) | 48.2 (9.0) | 40.3 (4.6) | 37.4 (3.0) | 47.2 (8.4) |
| Daily mean °F (°C) | 32.7 (0.4) | 33.8 (1.0) | 35.1 (1.7) | 40.5 (4.7) | 46.2 (7.9) | 50.8 (10.4) | 53.7 (12.1) | 54.4 (12.4) | 51.1 (10.6) | 44.1 (6.7) | 36.9 (2.7) | 34.1 (1.2) | 42.8 (6.0) |
| Mean daily minimum °F (°C) | 29.3 (−1.5) | 29.9 (−1.2) | 30.6 (−0.8) | 35.1 (1.7) | 40.5 (4.7) | 45.9 (7.7) | 49.4 (9.7) | 49.8 (9.9) | 46.5 (8.1) | 40.0 (4.4) | 33.6 (0.9) | 30.8 (−0.7) | 38.5 (3.6) |
| Mean minimum °F (°C) | 17.7 (−7.9) | 22.5 (−5.3) | 23.3 (−4.8) | 28.9 (−1.7) | 34.2 (1.2) | 40.2 (4.6) | 45.7 (7.6) | 45.4 (7.4) | 40.2 (4.6) | 33.2 (0.7) | 26.1 (−3.3) | 22.0 (−5.6) | 13.3 (−10.4) |
| Record low °F (°C) | 1 (−17) | 2 (−17) | 9 (−13) | 20 (−7) | 31 (−1) | 35 (2) | 40 (4) | 39 (4) | 30 (−1) | 20 (−7) | 5 (−15) | 5 (−15) | 1 (−17) |
| Average precipitation inches (mm) | 10.53 (267) | 7.99 (203) | 7.81 (198) | 5.80 (147) | 4.73 (120) | 3.59 (91) | 4.94 (125) | 7.87 (200) | 12.18 (309) | 14.53 (369) | 12.26 (311) | 11.81 (300) | 104.04 (2,640) |
| Average snowfall inches (cm) | 30.1 (76) | 19.7 (50) | 20.3 (52) | 2.1 (5.3) | 0.1 (0.25) | 0.0 (0.0) | 0.0 (0.0) | 0.0 (0.0) | 0.0 (0.0) | 1.5 (3.8) | 15.8 (40) | 20.4 (52) | 110.0 (279) |
| Average precipitation days (≥ 0.01 in) | 22.8 | 20.5 | 19.4 | 17.8 | 16.8 | 18.3 | 19.8 | 20.4 | 22.4 | 22.9 | 22.4 | 23.6 | 247.1 |
| Average snowy days (≥ 0.1 in) | 10.1 | 8.9 | 8.3 | 1.7 | 0.1 | 0.0 | 0.0 | 0.0 | 0.0 | 1.0 | 5.6 | 9.2 | 44.9 |
Source 1: NOAA
Source 2: National Weather Service

== Demographics ==
Historical population
| Census | Pop. | Note | %± |
|---|---|---|---|
| 1940 | 65 | | — |
| 1950 | 65 | | 0.0% |
| 1970 | 49 | | — |
| 1980 | 28 | | −42.9% |
| 1990 | 57 | | 103.6% |
| 2000 | 32 | | −43.9% |
| 2010 | 20 | | −37.5% |
| 2020 | 24 | | 20.0% |
U.S. Decennial Census

Elfin Cove first appeared on the 1940 U.S. Census as an unincorporated village. It appeared again on the 1950 census, but did not appear in 1960. It was returned again in 1970 and made a census-designated place (CDP) in 1980.

As of the census of 2000, there were 32 people, 15 households, and 9 families residing full-time in the CDP.

Among full-time residents, the population density was 3.0 inhabitants per square mile (1.2/km^{2}). There were 35 housing units at an average density of 3.3 per square mile (1.3/km^{2}). The racial makeup of the CDP was 93.75% White, 3.12% Pacific Islander, and 3.12% from two or more races.

Of the 15 households, 20.0% had children under the age of 18 living with them, 53.3% were married couples living together, and 40.0% were non-families. 26.7% of all households were made up of individuals, and 6.7% had someone living alone who was 65 years of age or older. The average household size was 2.13 and the average family size was 2.67.

In the CDP, the population was spread out, with 15.6% under the age of 18, 3.1% from 18 to 24, 28.1% from 25 to 44, 37.5% from 45 to 64, and 15.6% who were 65 years of age or older. The median age was 48 years. For every 100 females, there were 146.2 males. For every 100 females age 18 and over, there were 170.0 males.

The median income for a household in the CDP was $33,750, and the median income for a family was $33,750. Males had a median income of $48,750 versus $0 for females. The per capita income for the CDP was $15,089. There were no families and 5.6% of the population living below the poverty line, including no under eighteens and none of those over 64.
