= Excursion Inlet, Alaska =

Excursion Inlet, Alaska Ḵuyeiḵ’ L’e.aan
- Census-designated place
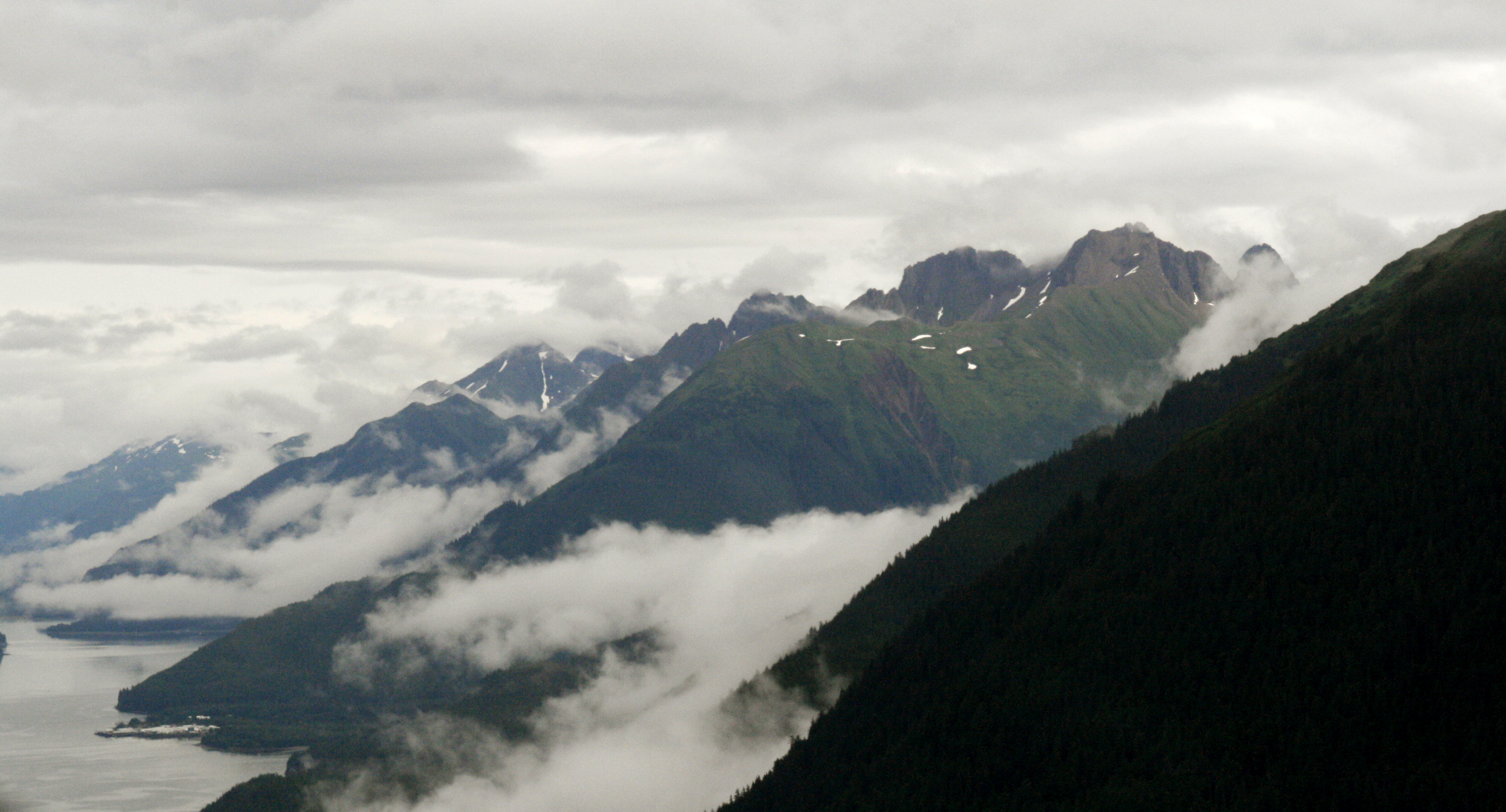
- Excursion Inlet as viewed from the air

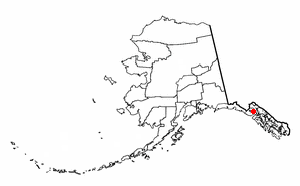
- Location of Excursion Inlet, Alaska
- Coordinates: 58°24′41″N 135°24′31″W
- Country: United States
- State: Alaska
- Borough: Haines

Government
  - Borough mayor: Tom Morphet
  - State senator: Jesse Kiehl (D)
  - State rep.: Andi Story (D)

Area
  - Total: 56.55 sq mi (146.47 km^{2})
  - Land: 56.41 sq mi (146.11 km^{2})
  - Water: 0.14 sq mi (0.36 km^{2})
- Elevation: 79 ft (24 m)

Population (2020)
  - Total: 40
  - Density: 0.70/sq mi (0.27/km^{2})
- Time zone: UTC-9 (Alaska (AKST))
  - Summer (DST): UTC-8 (AKDT)
- Area code: 907
- FIPS code: 02-23900
- GNIS feature ID: 1401951

Excursion Inlet (Lingít: Ḵuyeiḵ’ L’e.aan) is a census-designated place (CDP) in Haines Borough in the U.S. state of Alaska. The population was 40 at the 2020 census, up from 12 in 2010.

== Geography ==
The community of Excursion Inlet is located in southern Haines Borough at 58°24′41″N 135°24′31″W (58.411303, -135.408740), on the east side of Excursion Inlet, an arm of the Icy Strait. The CDP extends north to the boundary of Glacier Bay National Park near the head of Excursion Inlet, south to the mouth of Excursion Inlet, and east to the crest of the Chilkat Range.

According to the United States Census Bureau, the CDP has a total area of 55.4 square miles (143.5 km^{2}), of which 55.3 square miles (143.2 km^{2}) are land and 0.2 square miles (0.4 km^{2}), or 0.25%, are water.

== Demographics ==
Historical population
Census	Pop.	Note	%±
1940	23		—
2000	10		—
2010	12		20.0%
2020	40		233.3%
U.S. Decennial Census

Excursion Inlet first appeared on the 1940 U.S. Census as an unincorporated village. It did not reappear until the 2000 U.S. Census when it was made a census-designated place (CDP).

As of the census of 2000, there were 10 people, 8 households, and 2 families residing in the CDP. The population density was 0.2 inhabitants per square mile (0.077/km^{2}). There were 85 housing units at an average density of 1.5 per square mile (0.58/km^{2}). The racial makeup of the CDP was 100.00% White.

There were 8 households, out of which none had children under the age of 18 living with them, 25.0% were married couples living together, and 75.0% were non-families. 75.0% of all households were made up of individuals, and 12.5% had someone living alone who was 65 years of age or older. The average household size was 1.25 and the average family size was 2.00.

In the CDP, the population age groups were spread out, with 30.0% from 25 to 44, 20.0% from 45 to 64, and 50.0% who were 65 years of age or older. The median age was 60 years. For every 100 females, there were 400.0 males. For every 100 females age 18 and over, there were 400.0 males.

The median income for a household in the CDP was $16,250, and the median income for a family was $10,000. Males had a median income of $38,750 versus $0 for females. The per capita income for the CDP was $18,188. Below the poverty line were 25.0% of the population, 50.0% of families, none of those under 18 and 40.0% of those over 64.

== History ==
Excursion Inlet was originally an Alaska Native settlement, one of several locations where the Huna Tlingit dispersed around 1750 (Little Ice Age) when the glaciers of present day Glacier Bay Basin advanced into Icy Strait. Excursion Inlet has had a fishing cannery since 1891. The current plant, constructed in 1918, still functions to this day. It mostly processes pink and chum salmon, as well as salmon roe, salmon caviar, halibut and sablefish. It is located near the mouth of the inlet, about 40 miles (64 km) west of Juneau. Its seasons run from late June to mid-September. Excursion Inlet Cannery is one of the largest fish canneries in the world and was acquired by Ocean Beauty Seafoods in 2003.

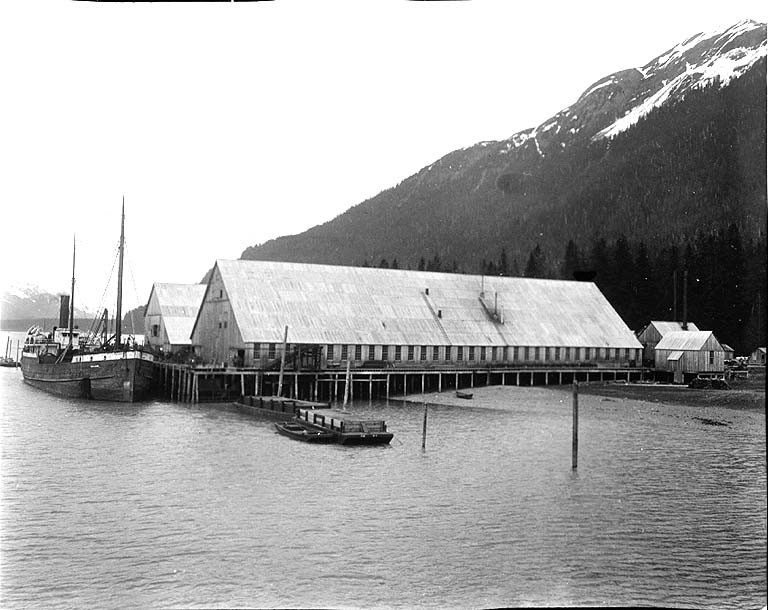
Pacific American Fisheries cannery at Excursion Inlet, June 1911

During the early stages of American involvement in World War II, the United States Army built a major barge terminal at Excursion Inlet. Capable of handling large ocean-going cargo ships and intended to be manned by thousands of soldiers, the terminal was built to serve as a logistics base for the Army's efforts to liberate the Aleutian Islands from their Japanese invaders. However, by the time the terminal was completed in late 1943, the Aleutian Campaign was effectively over, and the terminal had no evident future purpose. When the facility's existence became public knowledge in early 1945, newspapers decried it as a wasteful boondoggle, and the Army opted to quietly shut it down. German prisoners of war were later brought in to dismantle the base and salvage usable materials. The docks and some of the buildings were sold to the cannery and remain standing today.
