= Gustavus Airport =

Airport in Alaska, United States

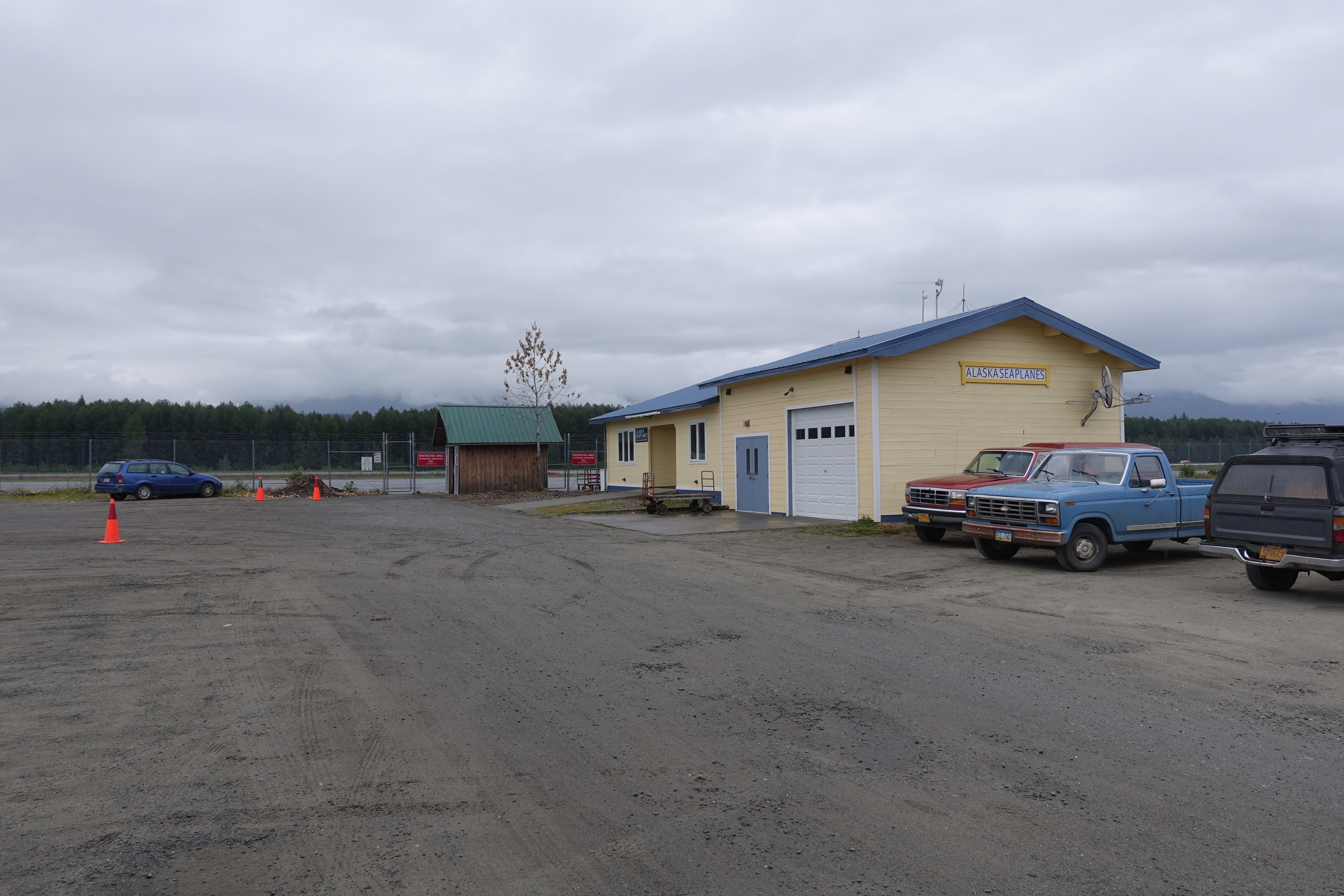
- IATA: GST; ICAO: PAGS; FAA LID: GST

Summary
- Airport type: Public
- Owner: State of Alaska DOT&PF - Southeastern Region
- Serves: Gustavus, Alaska
- Elevation AMSL: 35 ft (11 m)
- Coordinates: 58°25′37″N 135°42′23″W

Map
- Location of airport in Alaska

Runways
Direction	Length		Surface
Direction	ft	m	Surface
2/20	3,010	917	Asphalt
11/29	6,720	2,048	Asphalt

Statistics (2019)
- Aircraft operations (year ending 4/30/2019): 5,750
- Based aircraft: 13
- Source: Federal Aviation Administration

Gustavus Airport (IATA: GST, ICAO: PAGS, FAA LID: GST) is a state-owned public-use airport located in Gustavus, a city in the Hoonah-Angoon Census Area of the U.S. state of Alaska. Scheduled airline service is subsidized by the Essential Air Service program.

As per Federal Aviation Administration records, the airport had 11,828 passenger boardings (enplanements) in calendar year 2008, 8,822 enplanements in 2009, and 9,996 in 2010. It is included in the National Plan of Integrated Airport Systems for 2015–2019, which categorized it as a nonprimary commercial service airport based on 9,509 enplanements in 2014.

== Facilities and aircraft ==
Gustavus Airport covers an area of 1,821 acres (737 ha) at an elevation of 35 feet (11 m) above mean sea level. It has two asphalt paved runways: 11/29 is 6,720 by 150 feet (2,048 x 46 m) and 2/20 is 3,010 by 60 feet (917 x 18 m).

For the 12-month period ending April 30, 2019, the airport had 5,750 aircraft operations, an average of 110 per week: 57% air taxi, 38% general aviation, 3% scheduled commercial, and <1% military. At that time there were 13 aircraft based at this airport: 11 single-engine, 1 multi-engine, and 1 helicopter.

== Fuel and FBO services ==
Aviation fuel (only Jet A, no AVGAS) is available 24/7 on the airport from Avfuel provider Gustavus Dray, Inc., serving private, corporate and military aircraft. FBO services also include ramp escort and aircraft lavatory service.

There are no landing or tie down fees. There is no charge for transient aircraft parking. There are four concrete hard-stands for larger jet aircraft over 12,500 lbs.

== Airlines and destinations ==
Airlines	Destinations
Alaska Airlines	Seasonal: Juneau
Alaska Seaplanes	Juneau

Jet service is operated on a seasonal basis by Alaska Airlines with Boeing 737 aircraft.

== Statistics ==
Top airlines at GST (September 2021 - August 2022)
Rank	Airline	Passengers	Percent of market share
1	Alaska Airlines	11,380	58.39%
2	Air Excursions (Alaska Seaplanes)	7,610	39.04%
3	Kalinin Aviation (Alaska Seaplanes)	500	2.57%

=== Top destinations ===
Busiest domestic destinations (Sep. 2021 - Aug. 2022)
Rank	City	Airport	Passengers	Carriers
1	Juneau, AK	Juneau International Airport	9,740	Alaska, Alaska Seaplanes
2	Hoonah, AK	Hoonah Airport	10	

== Accidents at GST ==
- On November 23, 1957, An Alaska Air National Guard Douglas C-47 crashed attempting to land at night in snowy conditions at GST. The aircraft struck a tree and lost control and crashed. Four crew out of the 11 occupants on board were killed.

== See also ==
- List of airports in Alaska

== Other sources ==
- Essential Air Service documents (Docket OST-1998-4899) from the U.S. Department of Transportation:
  - Order 2004-5-5 (May 4, 2004): tentatively reselects Alaska Airlines, Inc., to provide subsidized essential air service at Cordova, Gustavus, Petersburg, Wrangell, and Yakutat (southeast) Alaska, for the period from October 1, 2003, through April 30, 2006, at an annual rate of $5,723,008.
  - Order 2006-3-20 (March 22, 2006): re-selecting Alaska Airlines, Inc., to provide subsidized essential air service at Cordova, Gustavus, Petersburg, Wrangell, and Yakutat (southeast) Alaska, for the period from May 1, 2006, through April 30, 2009.
  - Order 2009-2-3 (February 9, 2009): re-selecting Alaska Airlines, Inc., to provide essential air service (EAS) at Cordova, Gustavus, and Yakutat, for an annual subsidy rate of $5,793,201 and at Petersburg and Wrangell at an annual subsidy rate of $1,347,195, through April 30, 2011.
  - Order 2011-2-1 (February 1, 2011): re-selecting Alaska Airlines, Inc., to provide essential air service (EAS) at Cordova, Gustavus, and Yakutat, for an annual subsidy rate of $4,486,951 and at Petersburg and Wrangell at an annual subsidy rate of $3,415,987, from May 1, 2011, through April 30, 2013.
  - Order 2013-2-10 (February 11, 2013): re-selecting Alaska Airlines, Inc., to provide Essential Air Service (EAS) at Cordova, Gustavus, and Yakutat, Alaska, for $4,827,052 annual subsidy and at Petersburg and Wrangell at an annual subsidy rate of $3,476,579, from May 1, 2013, through April 30, 2015.
