= Gustavus, Alaska =

Gustavus, Alaska Wanachích T’aak Héen
- City
- Location in Alaska
- Coordinates: 58°24′59″N 135°44′44″W
- Country: United States
- State: Alaska
- Census Area: Unorganized Borough in Alaska
- Incorporated: 2004

Government
  - Mayor: Sally McLaughlin
  - State senator: Jesse Kiehl (D)
  - State rep.: Andi Story (D)

Area
  - Total: 56.96 sq mi (147.53 km^{2})
  - Land: 36.36 sq mi (94.17 km^{2})
  - Water: 20.61 sq mi (53.37 km^{2})
- Elevation: 9.8 ft (3 m)

Population (2020)
  - Total: 655
  - Density: 18.0/sq mi (6.96/km^{2})
- Time zone: UTC-9 (Alaska (AKST))
  - Summer (DST): UTC-8 (AKDT)
- ZIP code: 99826
- Area code: 907
- FIPS code: 02-30940
- GNIS feature ID: 1403078, 2419393
- Website: www.gustavus-ak.gov

Gustavus (Tlingit: Wanachích T’aak Héen) (gus-TAY-vəs) is a second-class city in Hoonah-Angoon Census Area in the U.S. state of Alaska. According to the 2020 census, it had a population of 655, a 48% increase from the 442 recorded in the 2010 census, making it one of the fastest growing communities in Alaska.

== History ==
Gustavus, formerly known as "Strawberry Point," lies on the outwash plain formed by the glaciers that once filled Glacier Bay. Two hundred years ago, the area was primarily a single large "beach" utilized by the native Tlingit people and others for fishing, berry picking, and other similar uses. The first settlers arrived in 1914 but left shortly afterward. The first permanent homestead was established in 1917, when Abraham Lincoln Parker moved his family to Strawberry Point. Many Gustavus residents are descendants and relatives of the original Parker homesteaders.

In 1925, the name "Gustavus," was adopted when the U.S. Post Office required a change for its new post office, although locals continued calling it "Strawberry Point" long afterwards. The new name came from Point Gustavus at the mouth of Glacier Bay.

In 1793, George Vancouver named Point Adolphus (at the northern tip of Chichagof Island, and today a well-known humpback whale feeding area) after Adolphus Frederick, the seventh son of King George III. In 1878, during a coastal survey, W. H. Dall saw "Adolphus" on the map and assumed it was for Swedish king Gustavus Adolphus. The point across Icy Strait from Point Adolphus at the mouth of Glacier Bay was not named on the map, so Dall called it "Gustavus". Another possibility is that Dall named Gustavus for Gustavus C. Hanus, a United States Naval Academy graduate who had extensive experience throughout southeast Alaska, and both Dall and Hanus served with the Coast Survey in Alaska. Hanus laid out the first streets in Juneau and helped quell the trouble in Klukwan in 1881.

There is still a large beach at Gustavus, with many strawberries. It is surrounded on three sides by Glacier Bay National Park and Preserve and bordered by water on the fourth. The area is a temperate rain forest; spruce and hemlock trees reach heights of 60 metres (200 ft), and alders, balsam poplar, fern, mosses, fireweed, lupine, and other plants are common. Gustavus's coastal location gives it a relatively mild winter. Summer temperatures range from 11 to 17 °C (52 to 63 °F), while winter temperatures range from −3 to 4 °C (27 to 39 °F).

== Geography ==
Gustavus is located at 58°24′59″N 135°44′44″W (58.416327, -135.745549).

According to the United States Census Bureau, the city has a total area of 36.9 square miles (95.7 km^{2}), of which 32.8 square miles (85.0 km^{2}) are land and 4.1 square miles (10.7 km^{2}), or 11.16%, are water.

Gustavus is split by the Salmon River, a small waterway crossed by a bridge for the paved road running out to Glacier Bay National Park. Coho salmon, Dolly Varden, and other fish are commonly caught in this river. Within the city limits, the river is affected by tides.

== Climate ==
Gustavus has a wet, maritime subarctic climate (Köppen Dfc) with short, mild summers and long, cold winters.

Climate data for Gustavus, Alaska (1991–2020 normals, extremes 1923–present)
| Month | Jan | Feb | Mar | Apr | May | Jun | Jul | Aug | Sep | Oct | Nov | Dec | Year |
|---|---|---|---|---|---|---|---|---|---|---|---|---|---|
| Record high °F (°C) | 54 (12) | 57 (14) | 60 (16) | 70 (21) | 81 (27) | 88 (31) | 87 (31) | 87 (31) | 75 (24) | 65 (18) | 58 (14) | 56 (13) | 88 (31) |
| Mean maximum °F (°C) | 41.7 (5.4) | 43.6 (6.4) | 47.5 (8.6) | 59.6 (15.3) | 69.8 (21.0) | 76.6 (24.8) | 74.7 (23.7) | 74.5 (23.6) | 65.4 (18.6) | 56.4 (13.6) | 46.2 (7.9) | 42.5 (5.8) | 80.2 (26.8) |
| Mean daily maximum °F (°C) | 32.1 (0.1) | 35.7 (2.1) | 39.9 (4.4) | 48.7 (9.3) | 56.5 (13.6) | 61.4 (16.3) | 62.9 (17.2) | 62.7 (17.1) | 56.5 (13.6) | 47.1 (8.4) | 37.8 (3.2) | 33.8 (1.0) | 47.9 (8.8) |
| Daily mean °F (°C) | 26.4 (−3.1) | 28.4 (−2.0) | 31.4 (−0.3) | 38.8 (3.8) | 46.0 (7.8) | 51.9 (11.1) | 54.8 (12.7) | 54.3 (12.4) | 48.4 (9.1) | 40.1 (4.5) | 31.9 (−0.1) | 28.7 (−1.8) | 40.1 (4.5) |
| Mean daily minimum °F (°C) | 20.6 (−6.3) | 21.2 (−6.0) | 22.8 (−5.1) | 28.9 (−1.7) | 35.4 (1.9) | 42.4 (5.8) | 46.6 (8.1) | 45.9 (7.7) | 40.3 (4.6) | 33.0 (0.6) | 26.0 (−3.3) | 23.7 (−4.6) | 32.2 (0.1) |
| Mean minimum °F (°C) | −0.3 (−17.9) | 4.8 (−15.1) | 5.8 (−14.6) | 19.0 (−7.2) | 26.9 (−2.8) | 34.3 (1.3) | 39.0 (3.9) | 37.5 (3.1) | 28.7 (−1.8) | 21.0 (−6.1) | 9.5 (−12.5) | 6.2 (−14.3) | −6.8 (−21.6) |
| Record low °F (°C) | −25 (−32) | −16 (−27) | −13 (−25) | 4 (−16) | 17 (−8) | 25 (−4) | 24 (−4) | 25 (−4) | 22 (−6) | 2 (−17) | −15 (−26) | −21 (−29) | −25 (−32) |
| Average precipitation inches (mm) | 5.94 (151) | 3.76 (96) | 3.17 (81) | 3.01 (76) | 2.98 (76) | 2.90 (74) | 4.41 (112) | 5.44 (138) | 8.21 (209) | 8.43 (214) | 6.79 (172) | 7.25 (184) | 62.29 (1,582) |
| Average snowfall inches (cm) | 18.1 (46) | 11.4 (29) | 11.7 (30) | 1.8 (4.6) | 0.0 (0.0) | 0.0 (0.0) | 0.0 (0.0) | 0.0 (0.0) | 0.0 (0.0) | 0.5 (1.3) | 10.8 (27) | 18.0 (46) | 72.3 (183.9) |
| Average precipitation days (≥ 0.01 in) | 20.2 | 16.7 | 16.9 | 17.9 | 15.9 | 16.2 | 17.8 | 19.4 | 21.5 | 23.1 | 21.0 | 20.8 | 227.4 |
| Average snowy days | 8.7 | 6.0 | 5.9 | 1.4 | 0.0 | 0.0 | 0.0 | 0.0 | 0.0 | 0.4 | 5.6 | 8.2 | 36.2 |
Source 1: NOAA
Source 2: National Weather Service

== Demographics ==
Historical population
| Census | Pop. | Note | %± |
|---|---|---|---|
| 1940 | 27 | | — |
| 1950 | 82 | | 203.7% |
| 1960 | 107 | | 30.5% |
| 1970 | 64 | | −40.2% |
| 1980 | 98 | | 53.1% |
| 1990 | 258 | | 163.3% |
| 2000 | 429 | | 66.3% |
| 2010 | 442 | | 3.0% |
| 2020 | 655 | | 48.2% |
U.S. Decennial Census

Gustavus first appeared on the 1940 U.S. Census as "Strawberry Point," an unincorporated village. In 1950, it returned as Gustavus and was made a census-designated place (CDP) in 1980. Its status was changed to an incorporated city in 2004.

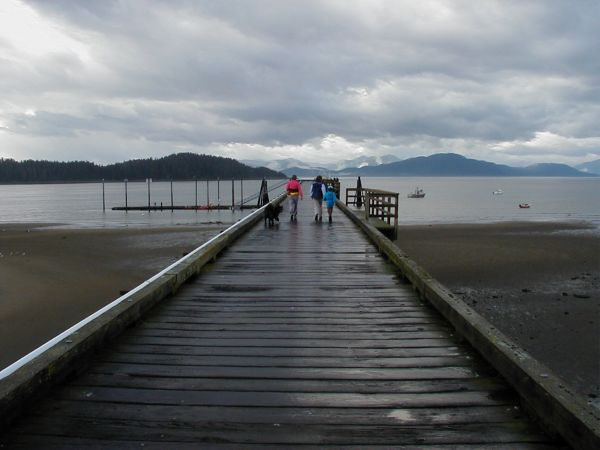
The original Gustavus dock, which has since been replaced.

=== 2020 census ===
As of the 2020 census, Gustavus had a population of 655. The median age was 51.0 years. 18.3% of residents were under the age of 18 and 26.6% of residents were 65 years of age or older. For every 100 females there were 101.5 males, and for every 100 females age 18 and over there were 108.2 males age 18 and over.

0.0% of residents lived in urban areas, while 100.0% lived in rural areas.

There were 302 households in Gustavus, of which 25.8% had children under the age of 18 living in them. Of all households, 52.3% were married-couple households, 24.2% were households with a male householder and no spouse or partner present, and 16.9% were households with a female householder and no spouse or partner present. About 28.8% of all households were made up of individuals and 15.9% had someone living alone who was 65 years of age or older.

There were 600 housing units, of which 49.7% were vacant. The homeowner vacancy rate was 3.6% and the rental vacancy rate was 26.6%.

Racial composition as of the 2020 census
| Race | Number | Percent |
|---|---|---|
| White | 564 | 86.1% |
| Black or African American | 1 | 0.2% |
| American Indian and Alaska Native | 34 | 5.2% |
| Asian | 0 | 0.0% |
| Native Hawaiian and Other Pacific Islander | 0 | 0.0% |
| Some other race | 4 | 0.6% |
| Two or more races | 52 | 7.9% |
| Hispanic or Latino (of any race) | 18 | 2.7% |

=== 2000 census ===
As of the 2000 census, there were 429 people, 199 households, and 114 families in the city. The population density was 11.4 inhabitants per square mile (4.4/km^{2}). There were 345 housing units at an average density of 9.2 per square mile (3.6/km^{2}). The city racial makeup was 89% White, 0% Black or African American, 4% Native American, 0.2% Asian, 0.2% Pacific Islander, 2% from other races, and 4% from two or more races. 1.4% of the population were Hispanic or Latino of any race.

Of the 199 households, 28% had children under the age of 18 living with them, 47% were married couples living together, 6% had a female householder with no husband present, and 43% were non-families. 38% of all households comprise individuals, and 6% had someone living alone who was 65 or older. The average household size was 2.2 and the average family size was 2.9.

In the city, the population was spread out, with 26% under the age of 18, 3% from 18 to 24, 30% from 25 to 44, 36% from 45 to 64, and 5% who were 65 or older. The median age was 40 years. For every 100 females, there were 130 males. For every 100 females age 18 and over, there were 135 males.

The median income for a household in the CDP was $34,800, and the median income for a family was $51,800. Males had a median income of $41,800 versus $29,400 for females. The per capita income for the city was $21,100. 15% of the population and 10% of families were below the poverty line. 13% of those under the age of 18 and 14% of those 65 and older were living below the poverty line.

== Economy ==
The Gustavus economy is strongly linked to the surrounding natural resources; tourism and commercial fishing are mainstays. However, the importance of commercial fishing is in decline, as the Dungeness crab fishery in Glacier Bay National Park was closed in the early 2000s and the fishing for Dungeness outside of the national park has become poor. Salmon and halibut remain the primary catch of the commercial fishing done out of Gustavus. Those not involved in tourism or seafood typically work for the government at the public school, the post office, the National Park Service, or the City of Gustavus.

The hardware and grocery store is called ToshCo, named after its owner and most of its inventory is from Costco in Juneau.

== Transportation ==
Gustavus is not connected to the contiguous highway system. Gustavus Airport and the Alaska Marine Highway provide access between Gustavus and the outside world. During the 2020 coronavirus pandemic, the ferry system shut down and Gustavus became even more isolated, relying on private boats for grocery shipments.
