= VTE =

VTE may mean:

- Contour Airlines (ICAO airline callsign VTE), an American regional charter airline
  - Contour Aviation, parent company of Contour Airlines based in Smyrna, Tennessee
- Venous thromboembolism
- Vaishnava Training and Education
- Virtual Terminal Emulator
- Virtual Terminal Emulator (widget), a widget used by programs such as GNOME Terminal
- Wattay International Airport (IATA: VTE), in Laos, near its capital Vientiane
- Vertical triple expansion, a type of multiple expansion steam engine
- Vancouver Transit Exchange, an Internet exchange point
