= Essential Air Service =

Program providing flights to rural US

Essential Air Service (EAS) is a U.S. government program enacted to guarantee that small communities in the United States, which had been served by certificated airlines prior to deregulation in 1978, maintain commercial service. Its aim is to maintain a minimal level of scheduled air service to these communities that otherwise would not be profitable. The program is codified at 49 U.S.C. §§ 41731–41748.

The United States Department of Transportation (USDOT) subsidizes airlines to serve communities across the country that otherwise would not receive scheduled air service. As of June 1, 2015, 159 communities in the US received EAS subsidies, of which 44 were in Alaska, two in Hawaii, and one in Puerto Rico. The decision as to what degree of subsidized service a community requires is made based on identifying a specific hub for the community and from there determining the number of trips, seats, and type of aircraft that are necessary to serve that hub.

These increases occurred despite numerous Congressional measures to contain program spending. The George W. Bush administration sought to reduce the cost of the program to $50 million by stricter eligibility criteria and requiring the local governments of the areas served to contribute to the cost. As of October 2024, subsidies for the program amounted $550 million.

Counties in the contiguous U.S. hosting Essential Air Service destinations, as of June 2023

== Community eligibility criteria ==
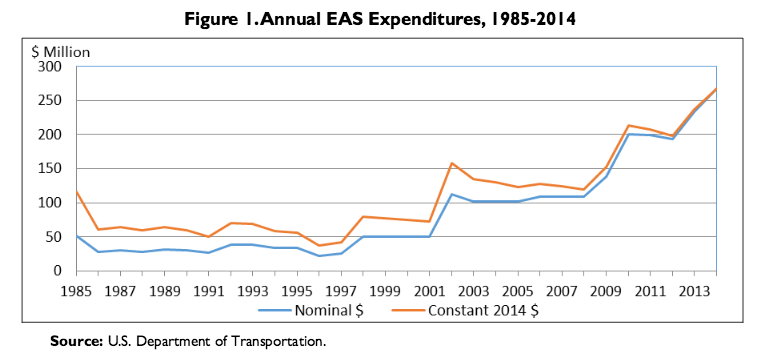
EAS subsidies have increased by more than 500% since 1997.

Pursuant to the Department of Transportation and Related Agencies Appropriations Act of 2000, no community within the 48 contiguous states may receive a subsidy greater than $200 per passenger unless the community is more than 210 miles (340 km) from the nearest large or medium hub airport. Pursuant to the FAA Modernization and Reform Act of 2012, to be eligible for the program, a community in the contiguous 48 states must either maintain an average of 10 or more enplanements per service day or be located more than 175 miles (282 km) from the nearest large or medium hub airport. The criteria for 10 or more enplanements can be waived by the Secretary of Transportation, on an annual basis, if a community can demonstrate that it is due to a temporary decline.

The Department of Transportation, pursuant to the Consolidated and Further Appropriations Act of 2015, is required to negotiate a local cost share with communities located less than 40 miles (64 km) from a small hub airport.

== Controversy ==
Critics question the economic and environmental efficiency of the service. According to a 2006 New York Times article on the program, the subsidy per passenger, averaged across the entire program excluding Alaska, is approximately $74, and much higher on some particularly poorly patronized flights where subsidies are as high as $801 per passenger.

The program is politically popular in the cities receiving the subsidized flights, many of which use an airport with scheduled service as a selling point to attract industry to their regions. Several subsidized airports are within an hour's drive from an unsubsidized airport.

== Report tables ==
The following tables list all Essential Air Service communities under the various funding programs. This is based on the most recent reports issued by the U.S. Department of Transportation (DOT), and updated to reflect changes based on DOT orders. Docket and order numbers link to their respective pages on the docket management site, which typically includes the original files in PDF and other formats. The hubs are designated using the three-letter IATA airport code assigned by the International Air Transport Association.

=== Subsidized EAS communities ===
==== Areas excluding Alaska ====
Jurisdiction	Community	Airport	Destinations	Air carrier	Aircraft / maximum seats	Annual subsidy	Docket	Order	Expires
AZ	Prescott	Ernest A. Love Field	Denver (DEN) Los Angeles (LAX)	SkyWest Airlines (as United Express)	Bombardier CRJ200 / 50	$5,879,690 (year 1) $6,291,268 (year 2) $6,731,657 (year 3)	1996-1899	2024-08-12	Aug 31, 2027
AR	Harrison	Boone County Airport	Dallas/Fort Worth (DFW) Memphis (MEM)	Southern Airways Express	Cessna 208 Caravan / 9	$3,789,614 (year 1) $3,884,355 (year 2) $3,981,464 (year 3) $4,081,000 (year 4)	1997-2935	2023-01-10	Feb 28, 2027
AR	Hot Springs	Memorial Field Airport	Dallas/Fort Worth (DFW) Memphis (MEM)	Southern Airways Express	Cessna 208 Caravan / 9	$2,936,106 (year 1) $3,009,509 (year 2) $3,084,747 (year 3) $3,161,866 (year 4)	1997-2935	2023-01-10	Feb 28, 2027
AR	Jonesboro	Jonesboro Municipal Airport	Nashville (BNA) St. Louis (STL)	Southern Airways Express	Cessna 208B Caravan / 9	$4,530,458 (year 1) $4,643,668 (year 2)	1997-2935	2026-03-16	Feb 29, 2028
CA	El Centro	Imperial County Airport	Hawthorne (HHR) Phoenix (PHX)	Advanced Air	King Air 350 / 9	$5,355,138 (year 1) $5,676,446 (year 2) $6,017,033 (year 3) $6,378,055 (year 4)	2008-0299	2026-09-13	Oct 31, 2030
CA	Merced	Merced Regional Airport	Las Vegas (LAS) Los Angeles (LAX)	Corporate Flight Management d.b.a. Contour Airlines	Embraer ERJ-135 / 30	$5,908,551 (year 1) $6,203,979 (year 2) $6,514,178 (year 3) $6,839,886 (year 4)	1998-3521	2026-03-19	Jun 30, 2030
CO	Alamosa	San Luis Valley Regional Airport	Denver (DEN)	Key Lime Air d.b.a. Denver Air Connection	Dornier 328JET / 30 or Embraer ERJ-145 / 50	$4,992,596 (year 1) $5,142,374 (year 2)	1997-2960	2026-06-16	Jun 30, 2028
CO	Cortez	Cortez Municipal Airport	Denver (DEN) Phoenix (PHX)	Key Lime Air d.b.a. Denver Air Connection	Metroliner 23 / 9	$6,876,394 (year 1) $7,357,741 (year 2) $7,872,783 (year 3) $8,423,878 (year 4)	1998-3508	2024-08-08	Sep 30, 2028
CO	Pueblo	Pueblo Memorial Airport	Denver (DEN)	Key Lime Air d.b.a. Denver Air Connection	Dornier 328JET / 30 or Embraer ERJ-145 / 50	$6,449,526 (year 1) $6,836,498 (year 2)	1999-6589	2025-03-07	Mar 31, 2027
HI	Hana	Hana Airport	Kahului (OGG)	Southern Airways Express d.b.a. Mokulele Airlines	Cessna 208 Caravan / 9	$956,792 (year 1) $995,064 (year 2) $1,034,866 (year 3) $1,076,261 (year 4)	1999-6502	2024-01-14	Jan 31, 2028
HI	Kamuela	Waimea-Kohala Airport	Kahului (OGG)	Southern Airways Express d.b.a. Mokulele Airlines	Cessna 208 Caravan / 9	$1,006,986 (year 1) $1,032,161 (year 2) $1,057,965 (year 3) $1,084,414 (year 4)	1997-2833	2025-07-03	Jun 30, 2029
HI	Kalaupapa	Kalaupapa Airport	Honolulu (HNL) Molokai (MKK)	Southern Airways Express d.b.a. Mokulele Airlines	Cessna 208 Caravan / 9	$2,380,027 (year 1) $2,439,528 (year 2) $2,500,516 (year 3) $2,563,029 (year 4)	2000-6773	2021-05-02	Apr 30, 2029
HI	Lānaʻi	Lanai Airport	Honolulu (HNL) Kahului (OGG)	Southern Airways Express d.b.a. Mokulele Airlines	Cessna 208 Caravan / 9	$4,682,056 (year 1) $4,799,107 (year 2) $4,919,085 (year 3) $5,042,062 (year 4)	2023-0183	2026-09-08	Aug 31, 2030
IA	Fort Dodge	Fort Dodge Regional Airport	Chicago-O'Hare (ORD)	SkyWest Airlines (as United Express)	Bombardier CRJ200 / 50	$6,471,432 (year 1) $6,924,432 (year 2) $7,409,142 (year 3)	2001-10682	2024-03-06	Mar 31, 2027
IA	Mason City	Mason City Municipal Airport	Chicago-O'Hare (ORD)	SkyWest Airlines (as United Express)	Bombardier CRJ200 / 50	$6,537,921 (year 1) $6,995,575 (year 2) $7,485,266 (year 3)	2001-10684	2024-03-06	Mar 31, 2027
IA	Sioux City	Sioux Gateway Airport	Chicago-O'Hare (ORD) Denver (DEN)	SkyWest Airlines (as United Express)	Bombardier CRJ200 / 50	$5,358,880 (year 1) $5,734,001 (year 2) $6,135,381 (year 3)	2011-0131	2023-12-20	Dec 31, 2026
IA	Waterloo	Waterloo Regional Airport	Chicago-O'Hare (ORD)	SkyWest Airlines (as American Eagle)	Bombardier CRJ700 / 65 or Bombardier CRJ900 / 76	$5,999,431 (year 1) $6,179,414 (year 2) $6,364,796 (year 3) $6,555,740 (year 4)	2011-0132	2026-03-12	Apr 30, 2030
IL	Decatur	Decatur Airport	Chicago-O'Hare (ORD)	SkyWest Airlines (as United Express)	Bombardier CRJ200 / 50	$6,120,951 (year 1) $6,426,999 (year 2) $6,748,349 (year 3) $7,085,766 (year 4)	2006-23929	2024-12-12	Dec 31, 2028
IL	Marion / Herrin	Veterans Airport of Southern Illinois	Chicago-O'Hare (ORD)	American Airlines Group (as American Eagle)	Bombardier CRJ700 / 65 or Embraer E170 / 65	$4,957,031 (year 1) $5,105,742 (year 2)	2000-7881	2026-05-14	Jul 31, 2028
KS	Dodge City	Dodge City Regional Airport	Denver (DEN)	SkyWest Airlines (as United Express)	Bombardier CRJ200 / 50	$6,880,125 (year 1) $7,361,734 (year 2) $7,877,055 (year 3)	1998-3502	2024-05-04	Apr 30, 2027
KS	Garden City	Garden City Regional Airport	Dallas/Fort Worth (DFW)	American Airlines Group (as American Eagle)	Bombardier CRJ700 / 65 or Bombardier CRJ900 / 76	$4,795,324 (year 1) $4,939,183 (year 2) $5,087,359 (year 3) $5,239,980 (year 4)	1998-3503	2026-05-15	Jul 31, 2030
KS	Hays	Hays Regional Airport	Denver (DEN)	SkyWest Airlines (as United Express)	Bombardier CRJ200 / 50	$6,022,964 (year 1) $6,444,571 (year 2) $6,895,691 (year 3)	1998-3497	2024-05-01	Apr 30, 2027
KS	Liberal, KS / Guymon, OK	Liberal Mid-America Regional Airport	Denver (DEN)	SkyWest Airlines (as United Express)	Bombardier CRJ200 / 50	$6,524,077 (year 1) $6,980,762 (year 2) $7,469,415 (year 3)	1998-3498	2024-05-04	Apr 30, 2027
KS	Salina	Salina Regional Airport	Chicago-O'Hare (ORD) Denver (DEN)	SkyWest Airlines (as United Express)	Bombardier CRJ200 / 50	$5,958,376 (year 1) $6,375,463 (year 2) $6,821,745 (year 3)	2002-11376	2023-12-18	Dec 31, 2026
KY	Owensboro	Owensboro–Daviess County Regional Airport	Chicago-O'Hare (ORD)	SkyWest Airlines (as United Express)	Bombardier CRJ200 / 50	$5,521,400 (year 1) $5,687,042 (year 2) $5,857,654 (year 3) $6,033,383 (year 4)	2000-7855	2023-05-30	Jul 31, 2030
KY	Paducah	Barkley Regional Airport	Chicago-O'Hare (ORD)	SkyWest Airlines (as United Express)	Bombardier CRJ200 / 50	$4,549,562 (year 1) $4,686,049 (year 2) $4,826,631 (year 3) $4,971,429 (year 4)	2009-0299	2025-09-19	Nov 30, 2029
ME	Augusta / Waterville	Augusta State Airport	Boston (BOS)	Hyannis Air Service d.b.a. Cape Air	Tecnam P2012 Traveller / 9	$3,021,655 (year 1) $3,263,388 (year 2) $3,524,459 (year 3) $3,806,416 (year 4)	1997-2784	2022-09-19	Oct 31, 2026
ME	Bar Harbor	Hancock County–Bar Harbor Airport	Boston (BOS)	Hyannis Air Service d.b.a. Cape Air	Cessna 402C / 9 or Tecnam P2012 Traveller / 9	$4,268,633 (year 1) $4,396,693 (year 2) $4,528,593 (year 3) $4,664,452 (year 4)	2011-0185	2024-09-06	Oct 14, 2028
ME	Presque Isle	Presque Isle International Airport	Boston (BOS)	JetBlue	Airbus A220-300 / 140	$8,700,000 (year 1) $8,700,000 (year 2)	2000-8012	2026-07-23	Aug 31, 2028
ME	Rockland	Knox County Regional Airport	Boston (BOS)	Hyannis Air Service d.b.a. Cape Air	Tecnam P2012 Traveller / 9	$3,303,476 (year 1) $3,567,755 (year 2) $3,853,175 (year 3) $4,161,429 (year 4)	1997-2784	2022-09-19	Oct 31, 2026
MI	Alpena	Alpena County Regional Airport	Detroit (DTW)	SkyWest Airlines (as Delta Connection)	Bombardier CRJ550 / 50 or Bombardier CRJ700 / 65/69 or Bombardier CRJ900 / 76	$6,750,234 (year 1) $7,222,751 (year 2) $7,728,343 (year 3)	2009-0300	2024-5-14	Sep 30, 2027
MI	Escanaba	Delta County Airport	Detroit (DTW) Minneapolis/Saint Paul (MSP)	SkyWest Airlines (as Delta Connection)	Bombardier CRJ550 / 50	$5,361,460 (year 1) $5,522,304 (year 2)	2003-15128	2026-01-09	Dec 31, 2027
MI	Hancock / Houghton	Houghton County Memorial Airport	Chicago-O'Hare (ORD)	SkyWest Airlines (as United Express)	Bombardier CRJ200 / 50	$6,513,688 (year 1) $6,969,646 (year 2) $7,457,521 (year 3)	2009-0302	2024-12-09	Jan 31, 2028
MI	Iron Mountain / Kingsford	Ford Airport	Detroit (DTW) Minneapolis/Saint Paul (MSP)	SkyWest Airlines (as Delta Connection)	Bombardier CRJ550 / 50	$5,015,812 (year 1) $5,166,286 (year 2) $5,321,275 (year 3) $5,480,913 (year 4)	1999-5175	2026-01-15	Jan 31, 2030
MI	Ironwood, MI / Ashland, WI	Gogebic–Iron County Airport	Chicago-O'Hare (ORD) Minneapolis/Saint Paul (MSP)	Key Lime Air d.b.a. Denver Air Connection	Dornier 328JET / 30 or Embraer ERJ-145 / 50	$7,204,867 (year 1) $7,709,208 (year 2) $7,709,208 (year 3) $7,709,208 (year 4)	1996-1266	2023-06-18	Sep 30, 2027
MI	Muskegon	Muskegon County Airport	Chicago-O'Hare (ORD)	Key Lime Air d.b.a. Denver Air Connection	Dornier 328JET / 30 or Embraer ERJ-145 / 50	$6,805,487 (year 1) $7,281,872 (year 2) $7,791,603 (year 3) $8,337,015 (year 4)	2009-0301	2022-08-25	Oct 31, 2028
MI	Pellston	Pellston Regional Airport	Detroit (DTW)	SkyWest Airlines (as Delta Connection)	Bombardier CRJ200 / 50 Bombardier CRJ550 / 50 Bombardier CRJ700 / 65/69 Bombardier CRJ900 / 76	$4,219,848 (year 1) $4,430,840 (year 2) $4,652,382 (year 3) $4,885,001 (year 4)	2011-0133	2024-12-07	Jan 31, 2029
MI	Sault Ste. Marie	Chippewa County International Airport	Detroit (DTW) Minneapolis/Saint Paul (MSP)	SkyWest Airlines (as Delta Connection)	Bombardier CRJ550 / 50	$4,984,855 (year 1) $5,134,401 (year 2) $5,288,433 (year 3) $5,447,086 (year 4)	2009-0303	2026-01-15	Jan 31, 2030
MN	Bemidji	Bemidji Regional Airport	Minneapolis/Saint Paul (MSP)	SkyWest Airlines (as Delta Connection)	Bombardier CRJ550 / 50 or Bombardier CRJ700 / 65/69 or Bombardier CRJ900 / 76	$4,227,249 (year 1) $4,438,611 (year 2) $4,660,542 (year 3) $4,893,569 (year 4)	2011-0134	2025-01-08	Feb 28, 2029
MN	Brainerd	Brainerd Lakes Regional Airport	Minneapolis/Saint Paul (MSP)	SkyWest Airlines (as Delta Connection)	Bombardier CRJ550 / 50	$5,055,895 (year 1) $5,207,571 (year 2) $5,363,799 (year 3) $5,524,713 (year 4)	2011-0135	2026-01-15	Jan 31, 2030
MN	Chisholm / Hibbing	Range Regional Airport	Minneapolis/Saint Paul (MSP)	SkyWest Airlines (as Delta Connection)	Bombardier CRJ550 / 50 or Bombardier CRJ700 / 65/69 or Bombardier CRJ900 / 76	$6,992,582 (year 1) $7,482,063 (year 2) $8,005,808 (year 3)	2003-15796	2024-05-13	May 31, 2027
MN	International Falls	Falls International Airport	Minneapolis/Saint Paul (MSP)	SkyWest Airlines (as Delta Connection)	Bombardier CRJ550 / 50	$5,652,073 (year 1) $5,821,635 (year 2) $5,996,284 (year 3) $6,176,173 (year 4)	2009-0304	2026-01-15	Jan 31, 2030
MN	Thief River Falls	Thief River Falls Regional Airport	Minneapolis/Saint Paul (MSP)	Key Lime Air d.b.a. Denver Air Connection	Dornier 328JET / 30 or Embraer ERJ-145 / 50	$5,801,556 (year 1) $5,975,603 (year 2) $6,154,871 (year 3) $6,339,517 (year 4) $6,529,702 (year 5)	2001-10642	2022-02-21	May 31, 2027
MO	Cape Girardeau / Sikeston	Cape Girardeau Regional Airport	Charlotte (CLT) Chicago-O'Hare (ORD)	Corporate Flight Management d.b.a. Contour Airlines	Bombardier CRJ200 / 30 Embraer ERJ-135 / 30	$5,927,496 (year 1) $6,223,871 (year 2) $6,535,064 (year 3) $6,861,818 (year 4)	1996-1559	2025-09-21	Sep 30, 2029
MO	Fort Leonard Wood	Waynesville–St. Robert Regional Airport	Chicago-O'Hare (ORD) Dallas/Fort Worth (DFW)	Corporate Flight Management d.b.a. Contour Airlines	Embraer ERJ-135 / 30	$5,727,896 (year 1) $6,014,291 (year 2) $6,315,005 (year 3) $6,630,755 (year 4)	1996-1167	2025-08-04	Sep 30, 2029
MO	Joplin	Joplin Regional Airport	Chicago-O'Hare (ORD) Denver (DEN)	SkyWest Airlines (as United Express)	Bombardier CRJ200 / 50	$5,459,372 (year 1) $5,841,528 (year 2) $6,250,434 (year 3)	2006-23932	2024-03-11	Apr 30, 2027
MO	Kirksville	Kirksville Regional Airport	Chicago-O'Hare (ORD) Dallas/Fort Worth (DFW)	Corporate Flight Management d.b.a. Contour Airlines	Embraer ERJ-135 / 30	$5,971,060 (year 1) $6,269,613 (year 2) $6,583,094 (year 3)	1997-2515	2026-06-10	Jul 31, 2029
MS	Greenville	Greenville Mid-Delta Airport	Atlanta (ATL) Dallas/Fort Worth (DFW)	Key Lime Air d.b.a. Denver Air Connection	Dornier 328JET / 30 or Embraer ERJ-145 / 50	$6,398,108 (year 1) $6,718,014 (year 2)	2008-0209	2025-07-06	Sep 30, 2027
MS	Hattiesburg / Laurel	Hattiesburg–Laurel Regional Airport	Houston-Intercontinental (IAH)	SkyWest Airlines (as United Express)	Bombardier CRJ200 / 50	$5,987,253 (year 1) $6,406,361 (year 2) $6,854,806 (year 3)	2001-10685	2024-03-03	Mar 31, 2027
MS	Meridian	Meridian Regional Airport	Houston-Intercontinental (IAH)	SkyWest Airlines (as United Express)	Bombardier CRJ200 / 50	$5,275,337 (year 1) $5,644,610 (year 2) $6,039,733 (year 3)	2008-0112	2024-03-03	Mar 31, 2027
MT	Butte	Bert Mooney Airport	Denver (DEN) Salt Lake City (SLC)	SkyWest Airlines (as Delta Connection and United Express)	Bombardier CRJ200 / 50 Bombardier CRJ550 / 50	$6,354,635 (year 1) $6,799,459 (year 2) $7,275,421 (year 3)	2011-0136	2024-10-10	Dec 31, 2027
MT	Glasgow	Glasgow Valley County Airport	Billings (BIL)	Hyannis Air Service d.b.a. Cape Air	Cessna 402C / 9 or Tecnam P2012 Traveller / 9	$2,719,975 (year 1) $2,855,974 (year 2) $2,998,773 (year 3) $3,148,711 (year 4)	1997-2605	2023-08-13	Dec 31, 2027
MT	Glendive	Dawson Community Airport	Billings (BIL)	Hyannis Air Service d.b.a. Cape Air	Cessna 402C / 9 or Tecnam P2012 Traveller / 9	$2,874,243 (year 1) $3,017,955 (year 2) $3,168,853 (year 3) $3,327,295 (year 4)	1997-2605	2023-08-13	Dec 31, 2027
MT	Havre	Havre City–County Airport	Billings (BIL)	Hyannis Air Service d.b.a. Cape Air	Cessna 402C / 9 or Tecnam P2012 Traveller / 9	$2,849,018 (year 1) $2,991,468 (year 2) $3,141,042 (year 3) $3,298,094 (year 4)	1997-2605	2023-08-13	Dec 31, 2027
MT	Sidney	Sidney–Richland Municipal Airport	Billings (BIL)	Hyannis Air Service d.b.a. Cape Air	Cessna 402C / 9 or Tecnam P2012 Traveller / 9	$6,002,320 (year 1) $6,302,436 (year 2) $6,617,558 (year 3) $6,948,436 (year 4)	1997-2605	2023-08-13	Dec 31, 2027
MT	West Yellowstone	Yellowstone Airport	Denver (DEN) - Seasonal Salt Lake City (SLC) - Seasonal	SkyWest Airlines (as Delta Connection and United Express)	Bombardier CRJ200 / 50 Bombardier CRJ550 / 50 or Bombardier CRJ700 / 65/69 or Bombardier CRJ900 / 76	$3,101,601 (year 1) $3,318,713 (year 2) $3,551,023 (year 3)	2003-14626	2024-02-19	Oct 15, 2026
MT	Wolf Point	L. M. Clayton Airport	Billings (BIL)	Hyannis Air Service d.b.a. Cape Air	Cessna 402C / 9 or Tecnam P2012 Traveller / 9	$2,902,953 (year 1) $3,048,100 (year 2) $3,200,505 (year 3) $3,360,530 (year 4)	1997-2605	2023-08-13	Dec 31, 2027
ND	Devils Lake	Devils Lake Regional Airport	Denver (DEN)	SkyWest Airlines (as United Express)	Bombardier CRJ200 / 50	$7,749,051 (year 1) $8,291,485 (year 2) $8,871,889 (year 3)	1997-2785	2024-07-02	Jun 30, 2027
ND	Dickinson	Dickinson Theodore Roosevelt Regional Airport	Denver (DEN)	SkyWest Airlines (as United Express)	Bombardier CRJ200 / 50	$5,451,987 (year 1) $5,833,626 (year 2) $6,241,980 (year 3)	1995-697	2024-08-13	Sep 30, 2027
ND	Jamestown	Jamestown Regional Airport	Denver (DEN)	SkyWest Airlines (as United Express)	Bombardier CRJ200 / 50	$7,443,767 (year 1) $7,964,830 (year 2) $8,522,369 (year 3)	1997-2785	2024-07-02	Jun 30, 2027
NE	Alliance	Alliance Municipal Airport	Denver (DEN)	Key Lime Air d.b.a. Denver Air Connection	Metroliner 23 / 9	$4,179,971 (year 1) $4,472,569 (year 2) $4,785,649 (year 3) $5,120,645 (year 4)	8322-0200	2025-08-16	August 31, 2029
NE	Chadron	Chadron Municipal Airport	Denver (DEN)	Key Lime Air d.b.a. Denver Air Connection	Metroliner 23 / 9	$4,185,771 (year 1) $4,478,775 (year 2) $4,792,290 (year 3) $5,127,750 (year 4)	2000-8322	2025-07-07	August 31, 2029
NE	Grand Island	Central Nebraska Regional Airport	Dallas/Fort Worth (DFW)	SkyWest Airlines (as American Eagle)	Bombardier CRJ700 / 65 or Bombardier CRJ900 / 76	$4,997,598 (year 1) $5,247,478 (year 2)	2002-13983	2025-03-14	Jun 30, 2027
NE	Kearney	Kearney Regional Airport	Denver (DEN)	SkyWest Airlines (as United Express)	Bombardier CRJ200 / 50	$5,894,232 (year 1) $6,306,828 (year 2) $6,748,306 (year 3)	1996-1715	2024-08-07	Oct 31, 2027
NE	McCook	McCook Ben Nelson Regional Airport	Denver (DEN)	Key Lime Air d.b.a. Denver Air Connection	Metroliner 23 / 9	$3,567,084 (year 1) $3,816,780 (year 2) $4,083,955 (year 3) $4,369,831 (year 4)	1997-3005	2024-06-06	May 31, 2028
NE	North Platte	North Platte Regional Airport	Denver (DEN)	SkyWest Airlines (as United Express)	Bombardier CRJ200 / 50	$5,119,465 (year 1) $5,477,828 (year 2) $5,861,276 (year 3)	1999-5173	2023-12-18	Dec 31, 2026
NE	Scottsbluff	Western Nebraska Regional Airport	Denver (DEN)	SkyWest Airlines (as United Express)	Bombardier CRJ200 / 50	$4,732,229 (year 1) $5,063,485 (year 2) $5,417,929 (year 3)	2003-14535	2023-12-18	Dec 31, 2026
NH	Lebanon, NH / White River Junction, VT	Lebanon Municipal Airport	Boston (BOS) White Plains (HPN)	Hyannis Air Service d.b.a. Cape Air	Tecnam P2012 Traveller / 9	$5,226,722 (year 1) $5,644,860 (year 2) $6,096,449 (year 3) $6,584,164 (year 4)	2003-14822	2022-11-31	Nov 30, 2026
NM	Carlsbad	Cavern City Air Terminal	Albuquerque (ABQ) Denver (DEN)	Corporate Flight Management d.b.a. Contour Airlines	Embraer ERJ-135 or 145 / 30	$5,814,921 (year 1) $6,105,667 (year 2) $6,410,950 (year 3) $6,731,498 (year 4)	2002-12802	2026-02-05	Feb 28, 2030
NM	Clovis	Clovis Regional Airport	Dallas/Fort Worth (DFW) Denver (DEN)	Key Lime Air d.b.a. Denver Air Connection	Dornier 328JET / 30 or Embraer ERJ-145 / 50	$4,960,369 (year 1) $5,109,180 (year 2) $5,262,455 (year 3) $5,420,329 (year 4)	1996-1902	2026-05-06	Apr 30, 2030
NM	Silver City / Hurley / Deming	Grant County Airport	Albuquerque (ABQ) Phoenix (PHX)	Advanced Air	King Air 350 / 9	$6,996,030 (year 1) $7,485,752 (year 2) $8,009,755 (year 3) $8,570,438 (year 4)	1996-1903	2025-03-01	Jan 31, 2029
NY	Massena	Massena International Airport	Boston (BOS)	Boutique Air	Pilatus PC-12 / 8	$5,756,644 (year 1) $6,044,477 (year 2) $6,225,811 (year 3)	2012-0163	2025-03-23	Mar 31, 2028
NY	Ogdensburg	Ogdensburg International Airport	Washington-Dulles (IAD)	Breeze Airways	Airbus A220 / 137	$4,996,757 (year 1) $5,196,627 (year 2) $5,404,492 (year 3)	1997-2842	2026-7-9	Sep 30, 2029
NY	Saranac Lake / Lake Placid	Adirondack Regional Airport	Boston (BOS) New York-JFK (JFK)	Hyannis Air Service d.b.a. Cape Air	Cessna 402C / 8 or 9 or Tecnam P2012 Traveller / 8 or 9	$4,496,758 (year 1) $4,744,080 (year 2)	2000-8025	2026-02-11	Feb 29, 2028
NY	Watertown	Watertown International Airport	Philadelphia (PHL)	American Airlines Group (as American Eagle)	Embraer ERJ-145 / 50	$4,370,897 (year 1) $4,589,442 (year 2)	2013-0188	2025-09-22	Jan 31, 2028
OR	Pendleton	Eastern Oregon Regional Airport	Portland (PDX)	Boutique Air	Pilatus PC-12 / 8 or 9	$4,794,536 (year 1) $5,130,153 (year 2) $5,386,661 (year 3) $5,655,994 (year 4)	2004-19934	2026-05-16	May 31, 2030
PA	Bradford	Bradford Regional Airport	Pittsburgh (PIT) Washington-Dulles (IAD)	Southern Airways Express	Cessna 208 Caravan / 9	$2,888,123 (year 1) $2,960,326 (year 2) $3,034,334 (year 3) $3,110,192 (year 4)	2003-14528	2022-09-18	Oct 31, 2026
PA	DuBois	DuBois Regional Airport	Pittsburgh (PIT) Washington-Dulles (IAD)	Southern Airways Express	Cessna 208 Caravan / 9	$5,145,108 (year 1) $5,273,736 (year 2)	2004-17617	2024-12-05	Oct 31, 2026
PA	Johnstown	Johnstown–Cambria County Airport	Chicago-O'Hare (ORD) Washington-Dulles (IAD)	SkyWest Airlines (as United Express)	Bombardier CRJ200 / 50	$5,673,281 (year 1) $5,843,480 (year 2) $6,018,784 (year 3) $6,199,384 (year 4)	2002-11451	2025-08-05	Oct 31, 2029
PA	Lancaster	Lancaster Airport	Chicago-O'Hare (ORD)	SkyWest Airlines (as United Express)	Bombardier CRJ200 / 50	$5,173,875 (year 1) $5,329,091 (year 2) $5,488,964 (year 3) $5,653,633 (year 4)	2002-11450	2026-01-18	Dec 31, 2029
PR	Mayagüez	Eugenio María de Hostos Airport	San Juan (SJU)	Hyannis Air Service d.b.a. Cape Air	Cessna 402C - 8 or 9 Britten-Norman Islander - 8 or 9 Tecnam P2012 Traveller - 8 or 9	$2,030,765 (year 1) $2,142,458 (year 2) $2,260,293 (year 3) $2,384,609 (year 4) $2,515,762 (year 5)	2004-19622	2026-02-10	Apr 30, 2031
SD	Aberdeen	Aberdeen Regional Airport	Minneapolis/Saint Paul (MSP)	SkyWest Airlines (as Delta Connection)	Bombardier CRJ550 / 50 or Bombardier CRJ700 / 65 or 69 or Bombardier CRJ900 / 76	$5,097,827 (year 1) $5,352,718 (year 2) $5,620,354 (year 3) $5,901,372 (year 4)	2011-0137	2025-01-08	Feb 28, 2029
SD	Pierre	Pierre Regional Airport	Denver (DEN)	SkyWest Airlines (as United Express)	Bombardier CRJ200 / 50	$5,481,736 (year 1) $5,646,188 (year 2) $5,815,573 (year 3) $5,990,041 (year 4)	2011-0138	2025-04-01	May 31, 2029
SD	Watertown	Watertown Regional Airport	Chicago-O'Hare (ORD) Denver (DEN)	SkyWest Airlines (as United Express)	Bombardier CRJ200 / 50	$6,301,661 (year 1) $6,490,711 (year 2) $6,685,433 (year 3) $6,885,996 (year 4)	2001-10644	2025-04-01	May 31, 2029
TN	Jackson	Jackson Regional Airport	Atlanta (ATL) Chicago–O'Hare (ORD)	Key Lime Air d.b.a. Denver Air Connection	Dornier 328JET / 30 or Embraer ERJ-145 / 50	$7,954,117 (year 1) $8,510,905 (year 2) $9,106,668 (year 3) $9,744,135 (year 4)	2000-7857	2024-08-04	Nov 30, 2028
TX	Victoria	Victoria Regional Airport	Houston-Intercontinental (IAH)	SkyWest Airlines (as United Express)	Bombardier CRJ200 / 50	$5,956,029 (year 1) $6,372,951 (year 2) $6,819,058 (year 3)	2005-20454	2024-01-13	Feb 28, 2027
UT	Cedar City	Cedar City Regional Airport	Salt Lake City (SLC)	SkyWest Airlines (as Delta Connection)	Bombardier CRJ550 / 50	$6,426,743 (year 1) $6,876,615 (year 2) $7,357,979 (year 3)	2003-16395	2024-12-06	Dec 31, 2027
UT	Moab	Canyonlands Regional Airport	Denver (DEN) Salt Lake City (SLC)	SkyWest Airlines (as Delta Connection andUnited Express)	Bombardier CRJ200 / 50 or Bombardier CRJ550 / 50	$5,424,337 (year 1) $5,587,068 (year 2) $5,754,680 (year 3) $5,927,320 (year 4)	1997-2827	2026-06-13	Sep 30, 2030
UT	Vernal	Vernal Regional Airport	Denver (DEN) Phoenix (PHX)	Corporate Flight Management d.b.a. Contour Airlines	Embraer ERJ-135 or 145 / 30	$5,447,040 (year 1) $5,719,392 (year 2) $6,005,362 (year 3) $6,305,630 (year 4)	1997-2706	2026-07-10	Sep 30, 2030
VT	Rutland	Rutland–Southern Vermont Regional Airport	Boston (BOS)	Hyannis Air Service d.b.a. Cape Air	Cessna 402C / 9 or Tecnam P2012 Traveller / 9	$3,369,473 (year 1) $3,554,794 (year 2) $3,750,308 (year 3) $3,956,575 (year 4)	2005-21681	2023-08-14	Oct 31, 2027
VA	Staunton	Shenandoah Valley Regional Airport	Charlotte (CLT) Chicago-O'Hare (ORD)	SkyWest Airlines (as American Eagle)	Bombardier CRJ200 / 50 or Bombardier CRJ700 / 65 or Bombardier CRJ900 / 76	$6,020,730 (year 1) $6,201,352 (year 2) $6,387,392 (year 3) $6,579,014 (year 4)	2002-11378	2025-09-14	Oct 31, 2029
WI	Eau Claire	Chippewa Valley Regional Airport	Chicago-O'Hare (ORD)	SkyWest Airlines (as United Express)	Bombardier CRJ200 / 50	$5,906,038 (year 1) $6,319,461 (year 2) $6,761,823 (year 3)	2009-0306	2024-09-05	Nov 30, 2027
WI	Rhinelander	Rhinelander–Oneida County Airport	Minneapolis/Saint Paul (MSP)	SkyWest Airlines (as Delta Connection)	Bombardier CRJ550 / 50	$4,755,240 (year 1) $4,897,897 (year 2) $5,044,834 (year 3) $5,447,086 (year 4)	2011-01-09	2026-01-15	Jan 31, 2030
WV	Clarksburg / Fairmont	North Central West Virginia Airport	Chicago-O'Hare (ORD) Washington-Dulles (IAD)	SkyWest Airlines (as United Express)	Bombardier CRJ200 / 50	$4,590,084 (year 1) $4,727,787 (year 2) $4,869,621 (year 3) $5,015,709 (year 4)	2005-20736	2025-11-13	Nov 30, 2029
WV	Lewisburg	Greenbrier Valley Airport	Charlotte (CLT) Chicago-O'Hare (ORD)	SkyWest Airlines (as American Eagle)	Bombardier CRJ200 / 50 or Bombardier CRJ700 / 65 or Bombardier CRJ900 / 76	$6,042,750 (year 1) $6,224,032 (year 2) $6,410,753 (year 3) $6,603,076 (year 4)	2003-15553	2025-09-14	Oct 31, 2029
WV	Morgantown	Morgantown Municipal Airport	Chicago-O'Hare (ORD) Washington-Dulles (IAD)	SkyWest Airlines (as United Express)	Bombardier CRJ200 / 50	$5,992,164 (year 1) $6,411,615 (year 2) $6,860,428 (year 3)	2005-20735	2024-09-18	Oct 31, 2027
WV	Parkersburg, WV / Marietta, OH	Mid-Ohio Valley Regional Airport	Charlotte (CLT)	Corporate Flight Management d.b.a. Contour Airlines	Embraer ERJ-135 / 30	$5,784,370 (year 1) $6,073,588 (year 2) $6,377,268 (year 3) $6,696,131 (year 4)	2005-20734	2026-05-13	Apr 30, 2030
WY	Cody	Yellowstone Regional Airport	Denver (DEN) - Seasonal	SkyWest Airlines (as United Express)	Bombardier CRJ200 / 50	$3,461,368 (year 1) $3,703,664 (year 2) $3,962,920 (year 3)	2011-0121	2024-05-12	May 31, 2027
WY	Laramie	Laramie Regional Airport	Denver (DEN)	SkyWest Airlines (as United Express)	Bombardier CRJ200 / 50	$5,052,740 (year 1) $5,406,432 (year 2) $5,784,882 (year 3)	1997-2958	2024-08-14	Sep 30, 2027

==== Alaska ====
Community	Airport	Destinations	Carrier	Aircraft	Annual subsidy	Docket	Order	Expires
Adak	Adak Airport	Anchorage (ANC)	Alaska Airlines	Boeing 737-700 / 124	$3,613,465 (year 1) $3,875,430 (year 2)	2000-8556	2025-08-01	Sep 30, 2027
Akutan	Grant Aviation Akutan Airport Maritime Helicopters Akutan Seplane Base	Grant Aviation Unalaska/Dutch Harbor (DUT) Maritime Helicopters Akun Island (7AK)	Grant Aviation Maritime Helicopters	Grant Aviation Beechcraft King Air 200 / 9 or Piper Navajo / 9 Maritime Helicopters Bell 206 Long Ranger 4 / 6	Grant Aviation $1,828,640 (year 1) $1,933,518 (year 2) $2,043,909 (year 3) Maritime Helicopters $1,613,950 (year 1) $1,692,502 (year 2) $1,777,652 (year 3)	2000-7068	2026-06-20	Jun 30, 2029
Alitak	Alitak Seaplane Base	Kodiak (ADQ)*	Redemption Inc. d.b.a.Island Air Service	Cessna 206 / 5 or De Havilland DHC-2 Beaver / 6	20% of $830,367 (year 1) $861,052 (year 2) $892,850 (year 3) $925,805 (year 4) $959,960 (year 5)	2000-6945	2025-10-08	Oct 31, 2030
Amook Bay	Amook Bay Seaplane Base	Kodiak (ADQ)*	Redemption Inc. d.b.a.Island Air Service	Cessna 206 / 5 or De Havilland DHC-2 Beaver / 6	2.5% of $830,367 (year 1) $861,052 (year 2) $892,850 (year 3) $925,805 (year 4) $959,960 (year 5)	2000-6945	2025-10-08	Oct 31, 2030
Angoon	Angoon Seaplane Base	Juneau (JNU)	Alaska Seaplanes	Cessna 208 Caravan / 9 Cessna 206 / 4 de Havilland Beaver / 6	$142,843 (year 1) $221,313 (year 2) $319,097 (year 3) $440,619 (year 4)	2006-25542	2022-12-11	Jan 31, 2027
Atka	Atka Airport	Unalaska/Dutch Harbor (DUT)	Grant Aviation	Beechcraft King Air / 9	$2,328,111 (year 1) $2,458,764 (year 2) $2,596,235 (year 3)	1995-363	2025-10-05	Sep 30, 2028
Central	Central Airport	Fairbanks (FAI) Circle (CRC)	Warbelow's Air Ventures	Piper Navajo / 8	$256,801	1998-3621	2025-11-10	Nov 30, 2027
Chisana	Chisana Airport	Tok (TKJ)	40-Mile Air	Cessna 185 / 3 or Cessna 206 and 207 / 4	$229,880	1998-4574	2025-06-08	May 31, 2027
Circle	Circle City Airport	Fairbanks (FAI) Central (CEM)	Warbelow's Air Ventures	Piper Navajo / 8	$256,801	1998-3621	2025-11-10	Nov 30, 2027
Cordova	Merle K. (Mudhole) Smith Airport	Anchorage (ANC) Juneau (JNU)	Alaska Airlines	Boeing 737-700 / 124	$5,718,676 (passenger) $27,600 (freighter)	1998-4899	2025-03-16	Apr 30, 2027
Diomede	Diomede Heliport	Nome (OME)	Pathfinder Aviation	Bell 212 / 9	$1,081,600 (year 1) $1,135,680 (year 2) $1,192,464 (year 3) $1,252,096 (year 4)	2009-0260	2026-07-11	Jun 30, 2030
Elfin Cove	Elfin Cove Seaplane Base	Juneau (JNU)	Alaska Seaplanes	Cessna 208 Caravan / 9 Cessna 206 / 4 de Havilland Beaver / 6	$329,352 (year 1) $388,744 (year 2) $460,787 (year 3) $548,306 (year 4)	2002-11586	2022-12-11	Jan 31, 2027
Excursion Inlet	Excursion Inlet Seaplane Base	Juneau (JNU)	Ward Air	Ward Air Cessna 206 / 3 Cessna 207 / 4	$54,308 (year 1) $60,288 (year 2) $67,578 (year 3) $78,388 (year 4)	2002-12014	2026-08-09	Sep 30, 2030
Gulkana	Gulkana Airport	Anchorage (ANC)	Reeve Air Alaska	Beechcraft King Air 200 / 9	$424,775 (year 1) $450,261 (year 2) $477,277 (year 3) $505,913 (year 4)	1995-492	2022-02-15	Jan 31, 2029
Gustavus	Gustavus Airport	Juneau (JNU) - Seasonal	Alaska Airlines	Boeing 737-700 / 124	$506,894	1998-4899	2025-03-16	Apr 30, 2027
Healy Lake	Healy Lake Airport	Fairbanks (FAI)	Wright Air Service	Cessna 206 / 5 or Cessna 208 Caravan / 9	$240,860	1998-3546	2024-08-19	Aug 31, 2028
Hydaburg	Hydaburg Seaplane Base	Ketchikan Harbor (WFB)	Taquan Air	de Havilland Beaver / 6 or de Havilland Otter / 7	$309,441 (year 1) $341,029 (year 2) $374,110 (year 3) $411,623 (year 4) $450,968 (year 5)	1999-6245	2025-11-11	Oct 31, 2030
Kake	Kake Seaplane Base	Juneau (JNU)	Kalinin Aviation LLC d.b.a. Alaska Seaplanes	Cessna 208 Caravan / 9 Pilatus PC-12 / 9	$958,621 (year 1) $1,075,887 (year 2) $1,203,649 (year 3) $1,343,575 (year 4)	2008-0217	2026-08-09	Sep 30, 2030
Kitoi Bay	Kitoi Bay Seaplane Base	Kodiak (ADQ)	Redemption Inc. d.b.a.Island Air Service	Cessna 206 / 5 or De Havilland DHC-2 Beaver / 6	2.5% of $830,367 (year 1) $861,052 (year 2) $892,850 (year 3) $925,805 (year 4) $959,960 (year 5)	2000-6945	2025-10-08	Oct 31, 2030
Lake Minchumina	Minchumina Airport	Fairbanks (FAI)	Wright Air Service	Cessna 208 Caravan / 9 or Cessna 206 / 4	$213,600	2008-0237	2022-11-14	Oct 31, 2026
Manley Hot Springs	Manley Hot Springs Airport	Fairbanks (FAI)	Wright Air Service	Cessna 208 Caravan / 9	$124,300	2004-17563	2026-09-03	Aug 31, 2028
May Creek	May Creek Airport	Gulkana (GKN)	Copper Valley Air Service	Cessna 185 / 3 (Winter) Cessna 206 / 5 (Summer)	$512,147 (year 1) $542,876 (year 2) $575,448 (year 3) $609,975 (year 4)	1995-492	2025-02-15	Jan 31, 2029
McCarthy	McCarthy Airport	Gulkana (GKN)	Copper Valley Air Service	Cessna 185 / 3 (Winter) Cessna 206 / 5 (Summer)	$512,147 (year 1) $542,876 (year 2) $575,448 (year 3) $609,975 (year 4)	1995-492	2025-02-15	Jan 31, 2029
McGrath	McGrath Airport	Anchorage-Merrill Field (MRI)	Alaska Air Transit	Pilatus PC-12 / 9	$563,895 (year 1) $585,786 (year 2)	2017-0108	2024-08-18	Nov 30, 2026
Minto	Minto Al Wright Airport	Fairbanks (FAI)	Wright Air Service	Cessna 208 Caravan / 9	$124,300	2004-17563	2026-09-03	Aug 31, 2028
Moser Bay	Moser Bay Seaplane Base	Kodiak (ADQ)*	Redemption Inc. d.b.a.Island Air Service	Cessna 206 / 5 or De Havilland DHC-2 Beaver / 6	10% of $830,367 (year 1) $861,052 (year 2) $892,850 (year 3) $925,805 (year 4) $959,960 (year 5)	2000-6945	2025-10-08	Oct 31, 2030
Nikolski	Nikolski Air Station	Unalaska/Dutch Harbor (DUT)	Grant Aviation	Beechcraft King Air / 9 or Piper Navajo / 9	$521,893 (year 1) $554,697 (year 2) $589,275 (year 3)	1995-363	2025-10-05	Sep 30, 2029
Olga Bay	Olga Bay Seaplane Base	Kodiak (ADQ)*	Redemption Inc. d.b.a.Island Air Service	Cessna 206 / 5 or De Havilland DHC-2 Beaver / 6	10% of $830,367 (year 1) $861,052 (year 2) $892,850 (year 3) $925,805 (year 4) $959,960 (year 5)	2000-6945	2025-10-08	Oct 31, 2030
Pelican	Pelican Seaplane Base	Juneau (JNU)	Alaska Seaplanes	Cessna 208 Caravan / 9 Cessna 206 / 4 de Havilland Beaver / 6	$578,820 (year 1) $700,936 (year 2) $853,751 (year 3) $1,040,497 (year 4)	2002-11586	2022-12-11	Jan 31, 2027
Petersburg	Petersburg James A. Johnson Airport	Juneau (JNU) Ketchikan (KTN) Seattle (SEA) - Freighter	Alaska Airlines	Boeing 737-700 / 124	$2,395,607 (passenger) $308,343 (freighter)	1998-4899	2025-03-16	Apr 30, 2027
Port Alexander	Port Alexander Seaplane Base	Sitka (SIT)	Baranautica Air Service	Cessna 185 / 3	$148,000 (year 1) $151,700 (year 2)	1999-6244	2025-10-06	Sep 30, 2027
Port Bailey	Port Bailey Seaplane Base	Kodiak (ADQ)*	Redemption Inc. d.b.a.Island Air Service	Cessna 206 / 5 or De Havilland DHC-2 Beaver / 6	5% of $830,367 (year 1) $861,052 (year 2) $892,850 (year 3) $925,805 (year 4) $959,960 (year 5)	2000-6945	2025-10-08	Oct 31, 2030
Port Williams	Port Williams Seaplane Base	Kodiak (ADQ)*	Redemption Inc. d.b.a.Island Air Service	Cessna 206 / 5 or De Havilland DHC-2 Beaver / 6	5% of $830,367 (year 1) $861,052 (year 2) $892,850 (year 3) $925,805 (year 4) $959,960 (year 5)	2000-6945	2025-10-08	Oct 31, 2030
St. George	St. George Airport	Unalaska/Dutch Harbor (DUT)	Grant Aviation	Beechcraft King Air / 9	$2,093,959 (year 1) $2,202,255 (year 2) $2,316,036 (year 3)	2017-0109	2025-10-05	Sep 30, 2029
San Juan / Uganik	San Juan (Uganik) Seaplane Base	Kodiak (ADQ)	Redemption Inc. d.b.a.Island Air Service	Cessna 206 / 5 or De Havilland DHC-2 Beaver / 6	10% of $830,367 (year 1) $861,052 (year 2) $892,850 (year 3) $925,805 (year 4) $959,960 (year 5)	2000-6945	2025-10-08	Oct 31, 2030
Seal Bay	Seal Bay Seaplane Base	Kodiak (ADQ)	Redemption Inc. d.b.a.Island Air Service	Cessna 206 / 5 or De Havilland DHC-2 Beaver / 6	10% of $830,367 (year 1) $861,052 (year 2) $892,850 (year 3) $925,805 (year 4) $959,960 (year 5)	2000-6945	2025-10-08	Oct 31, 2030
Seward	Seward Airport	Anchorage (ANC)	Reeve Air Alaska d.b.a. Arctic Legacy Aviation	Beechcraft King Air / 9	$778,647 (year 1) $792,516 (year 2)	2002-5-17	2026-01-21	Feb 29, 2028
Tatitlek	Tatitlek Airport	Anchorage-Merrill Field (MRI)	J & M Alaska Air Tours d.b.a. Alaska Air Transit	Cessna 208 CaravanEX / 9	$327,454 (year 1) $289,510 (year 2)	2013-0030	2025-10-09	Sep 30, 2027
Tenakee Springs	Tenakee Seaplane Base	Juneau (JNU)	Alaska Seaplanes	Cessna 208 Caravan / 9 Cessna 206 / 4 de Havilland Beaver / 6	$157,447 (year 1) $200,011 (year 2) $252,340 (year 3) $316,645 (year 4)	2006-25542	2022-12-11	Jan 31, 2027
West Point	West Point Village Seaplane Base	Kodiak (ADQ)	Redemption Inc. d.b.a.Island Air Service	Cessna 206 / 5 or De Havilland DHC-2 Beaver / 6	12.5% of $830,367 (year 1) $861,052 (year 2) $892,850 (year 3) $925,805 (year 4) $959,960 (year 5)	2000-6945	2025-10-08	Oct 31, 2030
Wrangell	Wrangell Airport	Ketchikan (KTN) Juneau (JNU) Seattle (SEA) - Freighter	Alaska Airlines	Boeing 737-700 / 124	$2,709,315 (passenger) $338,778 (freighter)	1998-4899	2025-03-16	Apr 30, 2027
Yakutat	Yakutat Airport	Anchorage (ANC) Juneau (JNU)	Alaska Airlines	Boeing 737-700 / 124	$5,815,877 (passenger) $24,076 (freighter)	1998-4899	2025-03-16	Apr 30, 2027
Zachar Bay	Zachar Bay Seaplane Base	Kodiak (ADQ)	Redemption Inc. d.b.a.Island Air Service	Cessna 206 / 5 or De Havilland DHC-2 Beaver / 6	12.5% of $830,367 (year 1) $861,052 (year 2) $892,850 (year 3) $925,805 (year 4) $959,960 (year 5)	2000-6945	2025-10-08	Oct 31, 2030

*Service includes flag stop(s)

=== Alternate Essential Air Service ===
The Alternate Essential Air Service program grants funds directly to the municipality or airport authority instead of the air carrier. This allows the community to recruit air service that would not otherwise meet EAS guidelines, such as more frequent service with smaller aircraft, less-than-daily service, flights to differing destinations at different times of the year or week, on-demand air taxi service, scheduled or on-demand ground surface transportation, regionalized air service, or even purchasing an aircraft. This alternative program has most often occurred as a public charter arrangement as prescribed by Title 14 of the Code of Federal Regulations, Part 380. The first airport to enter this program was Manistee County Blacker Airport in 2012.

Jurisdiction	Community	Airport	Destinations	Air carrier	Aircraft / maximum seats	Annual grant	Docket	Order	Expires
AL	Muscle Shoals	Northwest Alabama Regional Airport	Charlotte (CLT)	Corporate Flight Management d.b.a. Contour Airlines	Regional Jet / 30	$6,587,880 (year 1) $6,917,274 (year 2) $7,626,295 (year 3) $7,626,295 (year 4)	2000-7856	2022-08-15	Sep 30, 2028
AZ	Page	Page Municipal Airport	Las Vegas (LAS) Phoenix (PHX)	Public Charter	Regional Jet / 30	$5,492,029 (year 1) $5,766,631 (year 2) $6,054,962 (year 3) $6,357,710 (year 4)	1997-2694	2026-08-08	Sep 30, 2030
AZ	Show Low	Show Low Regional Airport	Phoenix (PHX)	Corporate Flight Management d.b.a. Contour Airlines	Regional Jet / 30	$5,640,760 (year 1) $5,922,798 (year 2) $6,218,938 (year 3) $6,529,885 (year 4)	1998-4409	2024-08-17	Sep 30, 2028
AR	El Dorado / Camden	South Arkansas Regional Airport at Goodwin Field	Dallas/Fort Worth (DFW)	Corporate Flight Management d.b.a. Contour Airlines	Regional Jet / 30	$6,598,335 (year 1) $6,829,277 (year 2) $7,068,301 (year 3) $7,315,692 (year 4)	1997-2935	2025-08-15	Aug 31, 2029
CA	Crescent City	Del Norte County Airport	Los Angeles-Hawthorne (HHR) Oakland (OAK)	Advanced Air	Dornier 328JET / 30	$4,161,287 (year 1) $4,577,415 (year 2) $5,035,157 (year 3) $5,538,673 (year 4)	1997-2649	2024-05-25	Sep 30, 2028
GA	Macon	Middle Georgia Regional Airport	Baltimore (BWI) Charlotte (CLT)	Corporate Flight Management d.b.a. Contour Airlines	Regional Jet / 30	$5,051,444	2007-28671	2023-09-04	Sep 30, 2027
IA	Burlington	Southeast Iowa Regional Airport	Chicago-O'Hare (ORD)	Corporate Flight Management d.b.a. Contour Airlines	Embraer ERJ-135 / 30	$6,637,685 (year 1) $6,969,569 (year 2)	2001-8731	2025-04-09	Jun 30, 2027
IL	Quincy, IL / Hannibal, MO	Quincy Regional Airport	Chicago-O'Hare (ORD)	Corporate Flight Management d.b.a. Contour Airlines	Embraer ERJ-135 / 30	$6,491,881 (year 1) $6,816,475 (year 2)	2002-14492	2025-08-14	Oct 31, 2027
MI	Manistee / Ludington	Manistee County Blacker Airport	Chicago-O'Hare (ORD)	Corporate Flight Management d.b.a. Contour Airlines	Regional Jet / 30	$6,849,260 (year 1) $7,191,723 (year 2) $7,551,309 (year 3)	1996-1711	2024-09-10	Sep 30, 2027
MS	Tupelo	Tupelo Regional Airport	Dallas/Fort Worth (DFW) Nashville (BNA)	Corporate Flight Management d.b.a. Contour Airlines	Regional Jet / 30	$6,924,540 (year 1) $7,270,767 (year 2) $7,634,057 (year 3) $8,016,020 (year 4)	2009-0305	2024-08-16	Sep 30, 2028
NY	Plattsburgh	Plattsburgh International Airport	Washington-Dulles (IAD)	Corporate Flight Management d.b.a. Contour Airlines	Regional Jet / 30	$6,845,871 (year 1) $7,188,165 (year 2) $7,547,573 (year 3)	2003-14783	2024-08-21	Sep 30, 2027
PA	Altoona	Altoona–Blair County Airport	Charlotte (CLT)	Corporate Flight Management d.b.a. Contour Airlines	Regional Jet / 30	$6,492,990 (year 1) $6,817,640 (year 2) $7,158,522 (year 3) $7,516,448 (year 4)	2002-11446	2024-07-03	Sep 30, 2028
WV	Beckley	Raleigh County Memorial Airport	Charlotte (CLT)	Corporate Flight Management d.b.a. Contour Airlines	Embraer ERJ-135 / 30	$5,974,075 (year 1) $6,272,800 (year 2) $6,586,440 (year 3) $6,915,762 (year 4)	1997-2761	2025-09-20	Sep 30, 2029

=== Community Flexibility Pilot Program ===
Under the Community Flexibility Pilot Program, established in 2003, up to ten communities can receive a grant equal to two years' worth of subsidy in exchange for forgoing their EAS service for ten years. These grants must be used to fund projects that will improve the airport for general aviation. As of 2020, only one community has ever taken advantage of the program:

State	Community	Airport	Total grant	Docket	Order	Expires
CA	Visalia	Visalia Municipal Airport	$3,703,368	2004-19916	2017-1-2	Jan 2, 2027

== Communities formerly having subsidized EAS ==
The following tables list airports which formerly had Essential Air Service subsidized routes.

=== Areas excluding Alaska ===
State	Community	Airport	Service to hub(s)	Carrier	Aircraft/seats	Docket	Order	Ended	Reason/notes
GA	Moultrie/Thomasville	Moultrie Municipal Airport	Atlanta (ATL)	Eastern Atlantis Express	Jetstream 31	40437	89-9-37	Oct 1, 1989	Community exceed the $300 per passenger subsidy cap
KS	Indpendence/Parsons/Coffeyville	Independence Municipal Airport (Kansas)	Tulsa (TUL) Wichita (ICT)	Air Midwest	Metro	41030	89-9-37	Oct 1, 1989	Community exceed the $300 per passenger subsidy cap
IN	Kokomo/Logansport/Peru	Kokomo Municipal Airport	Chicago-O'Hare (ORD)	Direct Air	Chieftain	EAS-405	89-9-37	Oct 1, 1989	Community exceed the $300 per passenger subsidy cap
ME	Lewiston/Auburn	Auburn/Lewiston Municipal Airport	Boston (BOS)	Valley Airlines	Metro	21350	89-9-37	Oct 1, 1989	Community exceed the $300 per passenger subsidy cap
KS	Hutchinson	Hutchinson Municipal Airport (Kansas)	Wichita (ICT)	Air Midwest	Metro	41030	89-9-37	Oct 1, 1989	Community exceed the $300 per passenger subsidy cap
WI	Beloit/Janesville	Southern Wisconsin Regional Airport	Milwaukee (MKE)	MST Aviation	Piper Navajo Chieftain	39162	89-9-37	Oct 1, 1989	Community exceed the $300 per passenger subsidy cap
AZ	Winslow	Winslow–Lindbergh Regional Airport	-	-	-	EAS-514	89-12-52	Jan 1, 1990	Air service terminated prior to DOT termination of EAS eligibility
NC	Rocky Mount/Wilson	Rocky Mount–Wilson Regional Airport	Charlotte (CLT)	CCAir	Jetstream 31	EAS-540	89-12-52	Jan 1, 1990	Reduced funding to meet basic EAS under guidelines set by Public Law 100-223
CA	Blythe	Blythe Airport	Ontario (ONT)	Air L.A.	Piper Navajo Chieftain	39374	89-12-52	Jan 1, 1990	Reduced funding to meet basic EAS under guidelines set by Public Law 100-223
NC	Winston-Salem	Smith Reynolds Airport	Charlotte (CLT)	CCAir	Beech C-99	41616	89-12-52	Jan 1, 1990	Reduced funding to meet basic EAS under guidelines set by Public Law 100-223
IN	Elkhart	Elkhart Municipal Airport	Chicago-Miday (MDW)	Iowa Airways d.b.a. Midway Connection	Embraer Bandeirante		89-12-52	Jan 1, 1990	Reduced funding to meet basic EAS under guidelines set by Public Law 100-223
OH	Mansfield	Mansfield Lahm Regional Airport	Cleveland (CLE)	GCS Air Service	Beechcraft		89-12-52	Jan 1, 1990	Reduced funding to meet basic EAS under guidelines set by Public Law 100-223
IA	Clinton	Clinton Airport	Chicago	Propheter Aviation	Cessna 402	38503	89-12-52	Jan 1, 1990	Reduced funding to meet basic EAS under guidelines set by Public Law 100-223
OK	McAlester	McAlester Regional Airport	Dallas-Ft. Worth (DFW) via Paris, TX (PRX)	Exec Express II	Piper T-1020	34544	89-12-52	Jan 1, 1990	Reduced funding to meet basic EAS under guidelines set by Public Law 100-223
MA	New Bedford/Fall River	-	-	-	-	34194	89-12-52	Jan 1, 1990	Airline service was being provided free of subsidy.
MI	Benton Harbor/St. Joseph	Southwest Michigan Regional Airport	Elkhart, IN (EKM) Chicago-Midway (MDW)	Iowa Airways	Embraer Bandeirante	40810	89-12-52	Jan 1, 1990	Reduced funding to meet basic EAS under guidelines set by Public Law 100-223
TN/KY	Clarksville/Fort Campbell/Hopkinsville	Clarksville–Montgomery County Regional Airport	-	-	-	35307	89-12-52	Jan 1, 1990	Air service terminated prior to DOT termination of EAS eligibility
MI	Jackson	Jackson County Airport (Michigan)	Ann Arbor (ARB) Detroit (DTW)	Drummond Island Air	Piper PA-46	EAS-452	89-12-52	Jan 1, 1990	Reduced funding to meet basic EAS under guidelines set by Public Law 100-223
TX	Brownsville	Brownsville/South Padre Island International Airport	-	-	-	-	89-12-52	Jan 1, 1990	No service
MI	Battle Creek	W. K. Kellogg Airport	-	-	-	-	89-12-52	Jan 1, 1990	No service
TX	Temple	Draughon–Miller Central Texas Regional Airport	Dallas/Ft. Worth	Exec Express II	Piper T-1020	40875	89-12-52	Jan 1, 1990	Reduced funding to meet basic EAS under guidelines set by Public Law 100-223
NE	Columbus	Columbus Municipal Airport (Nebraska)	Omaha (OMA)	Midcontinent Airlines	Embraer Bandeirante	36244	89-12-52	Jan 1, 1990	Reduced funding to meet basic EAS under guidelines set by Public Law 100-223
VT	Montpelier/Barre	Edward F. Knapp State Airport	Boston (BOS) via Lebanon, NH (LEB) New York-LaGuardia (LGA) via Lebanon, NH (LEB)	Precision Airlines	Beech 99	38818	89-12-52	Jan 1, 1990	Reduced funding to meet basic EAS under guidelines set by Public Law 100-223
NE	Sidney	Sidney–Richland Municipal Airport	Alliance (AIA) Denver (DEN)	GP Express	Cessna 402	35390	89-12-52	Jan 1, 1990	Reduced funding to meet basic EAS under guidelines set by Public Law 100-223
WI	Manitowoc	Manitowoc County Airport	Chicago O'Hare (ORD) Manistee (MBL)	Great Lakes Aviation	Beechcraft 1900D / 19	40205	89-12-52	Jan 1, 1990	Reduced funding to meet basic EAS under guidelines set by Public Law 100-223
AL	Gadsen	Northeast Alabama Regional Airport	Atlanta (ATL)	GP Express	Beech 99 / 14	92-3-55	93-11-44	Dec 1, 1993	Exceeded $200 subsidy cap.
NH	Laconia	Laconia Municipal Airport	Boston (BOS)	Atlantic North Airlines	Beech 99 / 15	87-5-83	93-11-44	Dec 1, 1993	Exceeded $200 subsidy cap.
CA	Stockton	Stockton Metropolitan Airport	Los Angeles (LAX)	Mesa	Beechcraft 1900D / 19 or Embraer Brasilia	92-2-16	93-11-44	Dec 1, 1993	Eliminated due to funding shortage, determined by factors set forth in Public Law 103-122
IL	Galesburg	Galesburg Municipal Airport	Chicago-Midway (MDW)	Direct Air	Beecraft 1300 / 13	EAS-395	93-11-44	Dec 1, 1993	Exceeded $200 subsidy cap.
TX	Paris	Cox Field	Dallas/Ft. Worth	Lone Star	Metro III / 19	93-10-27	93-11-44	Dec 1, 1993	Exceeded $200 subsidy cap.
IN	Bloomington	Central Illinois Regional Airport	Chicago-Midway (MDW)	Direct Air	Beechcraft 1900D / 19	EAS-391	93-11-44	Dec 1, 1993	Eliminated due to funding shortage, determined by factors set forth in Public Law 103-122
VA	Hot Springs	Ingalls Field Airport	Washington-Dulles (IAD)	Colgan Air	Beechcraft 1900D / 19	91-10-8	93-11-44	Dec 1, 1993	Exceeded $200 subsidy cap.
IN	Muncie/Anderson/New Castle	Delaware County Regional Airport	Chicago-Midway (MDW)	Direct Air	Beechcraft 1900D / 19	91-2-17	93-11-44	Dec 1, 1993	Eliminated due to funding shortage, determined by factors set forth in Public Law 103-122
WV	Elkins	Elkins-Randolph County Airport	Washington-Dulles (IAD)	Colgan Air	Beechcraft 1900D / 19	87-1-38	93-11-44	Dec 1, 1993	Exceeded $200 subsidy cap.
NJ	Trenton	Trenton–Mercer Airport	Baltimore (BWI)	Colgan Air	Beechcraft 1900D / 19	92-12-9	94-5-11	Jun 8, 1994	Public Law 103-122 reducing EAS program budget
IL	Danville	Vermilion Regional Airport	Chicago O'Hare (ORD)	Great Lakes Aviation d.b.a. United Express	Beechcraft 1900D / 19	EAS-393	94-10-20	Nov 30, 1994	Exceeded $200 subsidy cap.
VA	Danville	Danville Airport	Charlotte (CLT)	CCAir d.b.a. U.S. Air Express	Jetstream 31 / 19	49587	95-8-32	Oct 1, 1995	Exceeded $200 subsidy cap.
MN	Worthington	Worthington Municipal Airport	Minneapolis (MSP)	Great Lakes Aviation d.b.a. United Express	Beechcraft 1900D / 19	46794	95-11-28	Nov 27, 1995	Exceeded $200 subsidy cap.
AL	Anniston	Anniston Regional Airport	Atlanta (ATL)	Gulfstream International Airlines	Beech C-99 / 15	1995-889	96-5-31	Jun 1, 1996	Exceeded $200 subsidy cap. EAS funding shortages.
IL	Sterling/Rock Falls	Whiteside County Airport	Chicago O'Hare (ORD)	Great Lakes Aviation d.b.a. United Express	Beechcraft 1900D / 19	1996-1247	99-2-21	Apr 12, 1999	Exceeded $200 subsidy cap. EAS funding shortages.
IN	Terre Haute	Terre Haute Regional Airport	Chicago O'Hare (ORD)	Great Lakes Aviation d.b.a. United Express	Beechcraft 1900D / 19	1999-5174	99-5-8	Jun 2, 1999	Department allowed Great Lakes to exit. Community is within 70 miles from medium or large hub airport and/or exceeds $200 subsidy cap.
IL	Mt. Vernon	Mount Vernon Airport	Chicago O'Hare (ORD)	Great Lakes Aviation d.b.a. United Express	Beechcraft 1900D / 19	1996-1265	99-10-2	Oct 30, 1999	Exceeded $200 subsidy cap and less than 210 miles from multiple medium or large hub airports.
CT	Bridgeport	Sikorsky Memorial Airport	Baltimore (BWI)	Mesa Air Group operating as U.S. Airways Express	Beechcraft 1900D / 19	1999-6186	99-10-12	Nov 29, 1999	Airport is more than 70 miles from multiple medium or large hub airports. Community rejected proposal to terminal service with less than 90 days notice.
MN	Fairmont	Fairmont Municipal Airport (Minnesota)	Minneapolis (MSP)	Great Lakes Aviation	Beechcraft 1900D / 19	1998-3843	99-12-11	Jan 6, 2000	Exceeded $200 subsidy cap.
KS	Goodland	Goodland Municipal Airport	Kansas City (MCI)	Great Lakes Airlines	Beechcraft 1900D / 19	1999-6590	2000-2-18	Apr 1, 2000	Exceeded $200 subsidy cap.
CO	Lamar	Lamar Municipal Airport (Colorado)	Kansas City (MCI)	Great Lakes Airlines	Beechcraft 1900D / 19	1999-6590	2000-2-18	Apr 1, 2000	Exceeded $200 subsidy cap.
IL	Mattoon/Charleston	Coles County Memorial Airport	Chicago O'Hare (ORD)	Great Lakes Airlines d.b.a. United Express	Beechcraft 1900D / 19	2000-8324	2001-1-7	Feb 13, 2001	Exceeded $200 subsidy cap and less than 210 miles from multiple medium or large hub airports.
SD	Yankton	Chan Gurney Municipal Airport	Denver (DEN)	Great Lakes Airlines d.b.a. United Express	Beechcraft 1900D / 19	2000-8321	2001-4-6	Apr 30, 2001	Exceeded $200 subsidy cap and less than 210 miles from a medium hub airport (Omaha).
IA	Ottumwa	Ottumwa Regional Airport	Chicago O'Hare (ORD)	Great Lakes Airlines d.b.a. United Express	Beechcraft 1900D / 19	2000-8323	2001-9-1	Oct 1, 2001	Exceeded $200 subsidy cap and less than 210 miles from a medium hub airport (Omaha).
CA	Santa Rosa	Charles M. Schulz–Sonoma County Airport	San Francisco (SFO)	SkyWest Airlines d.b.a. United Express	Embraer Brasilia 120 / 30	2001-10439	2001-10-5	Nov 14, 2001	Airport does not meet subsidy criteria for EAS distance from large or medium hub airport. Department encourages air service due to high levels of demand.
NY	Utica	Oneida County Airport	New York City (JFK)	Champaign Enterprises d.b.a. CommutAir	Beechcraft 1900D / 19	2000-7556	2002-6-21	Jun 30, 2002	Exceeded $200 subsidy cap.
NM	Gallup	Gallup Municipal Airport	Albuquerque (ABQ) or Phoenix (PHX)	Mesa Airlines	Beechcraft 1900D / 19	1998-4706	2002-7-7	Jul 29, 2002	Exceeded $200 subsidy cap and less than 210 miles from a medium hub airport (Albuquerque).
OH	Youngstown	Youngstown–Warren Regional Airport	Detroit (DTW)	Mesaba Aviation d.b.a. Mesaba Airlines	Saab SF340 / 34	2002-12477	2002-9-12	Sep 9, 2002	Airport does not meet subsidy criteria for EAS distance from large or medium hub airport. Department encourages air service due to high levels of demand.
MA	Worcester	Worcester Regional Airport	Philadelphia (PHL)	Allegheny Airlines d.b.a. U.S. Airways Express	Dash-8 / 37	2003-14333	2003-2-6	Feb 23, 2003	Exceeded $200 subsidy cap and less than 70 miles from multiple medium or large hub airports. Community was amenable to suspending service.
WI	Oshkosh	Wittman Regional Airport	Chicago O'Hare (ORD)	Great Lakes Airlines	Beechcraft 1900D / 19	1999-5712	2003-2-20	Mar 1, 2003	Exceeded $200 subsidy cap.
KS	Topeka	Topeka Regional Airport	Kansas City (MCI)	Air Midwest d.b.a. U.S. Airways Express	Beechcraft 1900D / 19	1996-1352	2003-4-16	May 1, 2003	Exceeded $200 subsidy cap and less than 210 miles from a medium hub airport (Kansas City).
MS	Columbus	Golden Triangle Regional Airport	Memphis (MEM) including via Tupelo, MS (TUP)	Mesaba Aviation d.b.a. Northwest Airlink	Saab SF 340 / 34	2003-15127	2003-5-17	Jun 6, 2003	Community agreed to service suspension. Remaining unsubsidized service exceeds capacity limits.
NJ	Atlantic City	Atlantic City International Airport	Philadelphia (PHL)	Air Midwest d.b.a. U.S. Airways Express	Beechcraft 1900D / 19	2003-15413	2003-7-15	Sep 2, 2003	Airport does not meet subsidy criteria for EAS distance from large or medium hub airport
CT	New London/Groton	Groton–New London Airport	Philadelphia (PHL)	Air Midwest d.b.a. U.S. Airways Express	Beechcraft 1900D / 19	2003-15415	2003-7-15	Sep 2, 2003	Airport does not meet subsidy criteria for EAS distance from large or medium hub airport
IN	Lafayette	Purdue University Airport	St. Louis (STL)	Corporate Airlines d.b.a. American Connection	Jetstream 32 / 19	2004-16915	2004-1-24	Feb 15, 2004	Airport does not meet subsidy criteria for EAS distance from large or medium hub airport
NE	Norfolk	Norfolk Regional Airport	Denver (DEN) via North Platte (LBF)	Great Lakes Airlines	Beechcraft 1900D / 19	1998-3704	2004-5-15	May 25, 2004	Exceeded $200 subsidy cap and less than 210 miles from a medium hub airport (Omaha).
MA	Bedford	Hanscom Field	Trenton (TTN)	Shuttle America Corporation d.b.a. U.S. Airways Express	Saab 340 / 34	2004-17009	2004-3-8	May 31, 2004	Airport does not meet subsidy criteria for EAS distance from large or medium hub airport
PA	Reading	Reading Regional Airport	Philadelphia (PHL)	Air Midwest d.b.a. U.S. Airways Express	Beechcraft 1900D / 19	2004-14942	2004-6-11	Aug 25, 2004	Airport does not meet subsidy criteria for EAS distance from large or medium hub airport. Department encourages air service due to high levels of demand.
NM	Santa Fe	Santa Fe Regional Airport	Denver (DEN)	Great Lakes Airlines	Beechcraft 1900D / 19	2004-19825	2005-1-3	Mar 1, 2005	Airport does not meet subsidy criteria for EAS distance from large or medium hub airport. Other non-subsidized air service commenced after 90-day notice. Department order confirms ineligibility for subsidy.
TX	Brownwood	Brownwood Regional Airport	Dallas-Ft. Worth (DFW)	Air Midwest	Beechcraft 1900D / 19	1997-2402	2005-1-14	Mar 13, 2005	Exceeded $200 subsidy cap.
CA	Palmdale/Lancaster	Palmdale Regional Airport	North Las Vegas (LVT)	Scenic Airlines	Regional Aircraft / 19	2005-23350	2006-1-8	Jan 14, 2006	Airport does not meet subsidy criteria for EAS distance from large or medium hub airport
NC	Hickory	Hickory Regional Airport	Atlanta (ATL)	Atlantic Southeast Airlines	CRJ Regional Aircraft / 40	2005-22835	2005-11-10	Jan 23, 2006	Airport does not meet subsidy criteria for EAS distance from large or medium hub airport. Department encourages air service due to high levels of demand.
WV	Bluefield/Princeton	Mercer County Airport (West Virginia)	Washington-Dulles (IAD)	Colgan Air d.b.a. U.S. Airways Express	Beechcraft 1900D / 19	1997-2761	2006-6-22	Aug 1, 2006	Exceeded $200 subsidy cap.
OK	Enid	Enid Woodring Regional Airport	Denver (DEN) via Liberal, KS (LBL)	Great Lakes Airlines	Beechcraft 1900D / 19	1997-2401	2006-7-25	Sep 1, 2006	Exceeded $200 subsidy cap.
OK	Ponca City	Ponca City Regional Airport	Denver (DEN) via Dodge City, KS (DDC)	Great Lakes Airlines	Beechcraft 1900D / 19	1997-2401	2006-7-25	Sep 1, 2006	Exceeded $200 subsidy cap.
WA	Ephrata/Moses Lake	Moses Lake Municipal Airport	Boise (BOI) Portland (PDX)	Big Sky Airlines	Fairchild Metro II/23 / 19	1998-3344	2006-8-16	Sep 1, 2006	Exceeded $200 subsidy cap.
OR	Salem	McNary Field	Salt Lake City (SLC)	SkyWest Airlines d.b.a. Delta Connection	Regional jets / 50	2008-0221	2008-8-10	Oct 12, 2008	Airport does not meet subsidy criteria for EAS distance from large or medium hub airport
SD	Brookings	Brookings Regional Airport	Minneapolis/St. Paul (MSP)	Great Lakes Airlines	Beechcraft 1900D / 19	1997-2785	2008-12-30	Sep 30, 2009	Exceeded $200 subsidy cap
CA	Oxnard/Ventura	Oxnard Airport	Los Angeles (LAX)	SkyWest Airlines d.b.a. United Express	Embraer EMB-120 Brasilia / 30	2010-0041	2010-3-24	Jun 8, 2010	Airport does not meet subsidy criteria for EAS distance from large or medium hub airport
NM	Alamogordo, New Mexico/Holloman AFB	Alamogordo–White Sands Regional Airport	Albuquerque (ABQ)	New Mexico Airlines	Cessna Grand Caravan / 9	1996-1901	2012-2-14	Apr 1, 2012	Exceeded $1,000 subsidy cap
NV	Ely	Ely Airport	Las Vegas (LAS)	Great Lakes Airlines	Beechcraft 1900D / 19	1995-361	2012-12-14	Mar 31, 2013	Exceeded $1000 per passenger subsidy cap in effect at the time.
MT	Lewistown	Lewistown Municipal Airport	Billings (BIL)	Silver Airways	Beechcraft 1900D / 19	1997-2605	2013-6-13	Jul 16, 2013	Exceeded $1,000 subsidy cap
MT	Miles City	Miles City Airport	Billings (BIL)	Silver Airways	Beechcraft 1900D / 19	1997-2605	2013-6-13	Jul 16, 2013	Exceeded $1,000 subsidy cap
GA	Athens	Athens–Ben Epps Airport	Nashville (BNA)	Seaport Airlines	Cessna Grand Caravan	2002-11348	2014-6-6	Sep 30, 2014	Below 10 passenger enplanement requirement and did not submit an objection.
AZ	Kingman	Kingman Airport (Arizona)	Los Angeles (LAX) or Phoenix (PHX)	Great Lakes Airlines	Beechcraft 1900D / 19	1996-1899	2015-3-6	May 1, 2015	Exceeded $1,000 subsidy cap
KS	Great Bend	Great Bend Municipal Airport	Kansas City (MCI)	Seaport Airlines	Cessna Grand Caravan	1998-3496	2016-5-14	May 20, 2016	Exceeded $1,000 subsidy cap
WY	Worland	Worland Municipal Airport	Denver (DEN) via Riverton, WY (RIV)	Great Lakes Airlines	Beechcraft 1900D / 19	1997-2981	2016-5-16	Sep 30, 2016	Exceeded $1,000 subsidy cap
SD	Huron	Huron Regional Airport	Minneapolis/St. Paul (MSP)	Great Lakes Airlines	Beechcraft 1900D / 19	2000-7138	2014-7-10	Sep 30, 2016	Exceeded $1,000 subsidy cap
NY	Jamestown	Chautauqua County/Jamestown Airport	Pittsburgh (PIT)	Southern Airways Express	Cessna 208 Caravan / 9	2003-14950	2017-12-2	Jan 16, 2018	Not compliant with the Subsidy Cap and ten-enplanement requirement, and denies the community’s request for a waiver for these requirements. Numerous attempts to re-establish essential air service have failed.
MD	Hagerstown	Hagerstown Regional Airport	Baltimore (BWI) Pittsburgh (PIT)	Southern Airways Express	Cessna 208 Caravan / 9	2006-25228	2019-8-17	Oct 18, 2019	Below 10 passenger enplanement requirement and exceeded $200 subsidy cap.
PA	Franklin / Oil City	Venango Regional Airport	Pittsburgh (PIT)	Southern Airways Express	Cessna 208 Caravan / 9	1997-2523	2019-8-17	Oct 18, 2019	Below 10 passenger enplanement requirement and exceeded $200 subsidy cap.

=== Alaska ===
Community	Airport	Service to hub(s)	Carrier	Aircraft	Docket	Order	Ended	Reason
Klawock	Klawock Airport	Ketchikan (KTN)	L.A.B. Flying Service	Piper Cherokee	2006-26002	2006-10-7	Oct 7, 2006	Community agreed to suspending service with reliable alternative transportation.
Chatham	Chatham Seaplane Base	Juneau (JNU)	Ward Air	Cessna 185 / 3, or Cessna 206 / 4, or de Havilland Beaver / 6	1997-3134	2018-8-15	Sep 30, 2018	Low resident count, no objections to terminating service
Rampart	Rampart Airport	Fairbanks (FAI)	Warbelow's Air Ventures	Piper Navajo / 9	2008-0201	2016-8-2	Aug 2, 2016	Subsidy no longer required
Funter Bay	Funter Bay Seaplane Base	Juneau (JNU)	Ward Air	Cessna 185 / 3, or Cessna 206 / 4, or de Havilland Beaver / 6	1997-3134	2018-8-15	Sep 30, 2018	Low resident count, no objections to terminating service

== See also ==
- Surface and Air Transportation Programs Extension Act of 2011
- Public service obligation
