= EKM =

EKM ekm may refer to:

- Art Museum of Estonia (Estonian: Eesti Kunstimuuseum)
- Elip language (ISO 639-3 code: ekm)
- Elkhart Municipal Airport (FAA LID code), in Indiana, US
- Evangelical Church in Central Germany (German: Evangelische Kirche in Mitteldeutschland)
