= Manistee County Blacker Airport =

Public airport in Manistee, Michigan

- IATA: MBL; ICAO: KMBL; FAA LID: MBL

Summary
- Airport type: Public
- Owner: Manistee County-Blacker Airport Authority
- Serves: Manistee, Michigan / Ludington, Michigan
- Elevation AMSL: 621 ft / 189 m
- Coordinates: 44°16′21″N 086°14′49″W
- Website: flymanistee.com

Map
- Location of airport in Michigan MBL (the United States)

Runways
Direction	Length		Surface
Direction	ft	m	Surface
10/28	5,501	1,677	Asphalt
1/19	2,721	829	Asphalt

Statistics
- Passenger volume (2021): 10,056
- Departing enplanements (2021): 4,843
- Aircraft operations (2019): 5,315
- Based aircraft (2021): 9
- Sources: Federal Aviation Administration, Michigan DOT

Manistee County Blacker Airport (IATA: MBL, ICAO: KMBL, FAA LID: MBL) is a public use airport located three nautical miles (6 km) northeast of the central business district of Manistee, a city in Manistee County, Michigan, United States. It is owned by the Manistee County Blacker Airport Authority and is mostly used for general aviation.

Until March 2012, Frontier Airlines provided service to Milwaukee (MKE), subsidized by the Essential Air Service program. On March 15, 2012, a bid to provide Manistee County Blacker Airport with service to and from Chicago Midway International Airport was approved by the USDOT. On May 25, 2012, the Chicago Department of Aviation announced that the route would be flown by Public Charters, Inc. By 2023, Cape Air was flying out of Chicago's O’Hare, and had codesharing or interline agreements with other carriers including American and United.

The airport is included in the Federal Aviation Administration (FAA) National Plan of Integrated Airport Systems for 2021–2025, in which it is categorized as a local general aviation facility.

== History ==
On Saturday, April 1, 1961, the Manistee News-Advocate reported "North Central's inaugural Flight 914," piloted by Captain Leslie C. Raatz. The aircraft was a Convair 340.

Great Lakes Airlines decided not to bid for another two-year service contract to serve as the main airline. Instead, two other airlines bid and Frontier Airlines won. On September 20, 2011, Frontier announced that it would end its service to Milwaukee on March 8, 2012. Frontier cut the route along with others to discontinue its use of smaller non-efficient planes, including the Embraer 135 that served the route from Milwaukee to Manistee.

In May 2012, Public Charters Inc. began scheduled nonstop service, operated by Aerodynamics Inc. (ADI), from Chicago Midway International Airport to and from Manistee. Initially, it provided service with the Embraer-145, a 50-seat regional jet. Public Charters temporarily suspended service in October 2012 when Aerodynamics announced that it would no longer operate the flights. Public Charters' flights at Manistee were then operated by Contour Airlines. In March 2018, Contour Airlines offered six non-stop flights per week in each direction under the name North Country Sky utilizing the Jetstream 31 and Jetstream 41 turbo-prop aircraft. Ultimate Air Shuttle replaced Contour as the operator of the flights in 2019 utilizing the Dornier 328JET after Contour retired their Jetstream aircraft.

In the summer of 2020, Cape Air was selected to replace Ultimate Air Shuttle in serving Manistee. The initial bidding process for the contract at the airport became controversial when Boutique Air, who had submitted a rival bid, accused American Airlines, itself a partner of Cape Air's, of unfairly supporting Cape Air in the bidding process. Cape Air renewed its contract for an additional two years in 2022.

In late 2022, the airport began a PFAS investigation after its energy company notified the airport it is liable for exceeding contamination levels found at a former landfill site.

In September 2024, Contour Airlines came to an agreement with the Manistee County Blacker Airport Authority and the Michigan DOT to take over the EAS scheduled service from Cape Air. The route will serve Chicago O'Hare, and starts on October 1st, 2024. Cape Air's operations out of MBL will terminate on September 30th, 2024.

== Facilities and aircraft ==
Manistee County Blacker Airport covers an area of 290 acres (117 ha) at an elevation of 621 feet (189 m) above mean sea level. It has two asphalt paved runways: 10/28 is 5,501 by 100 feet (1,677 x 30 m) and 1/19 is 2,721 by 75 feet (829 x 23 m).

For the 12-month period ending December 11, 2019, the airport had 5,315 aircraft operations, an average of 15 per day: 75% general aviation, 19% scheduled commercial, 5% air taxi and less than 1% military. In June 2021, there were 9 aircraft based at this airport: 8 single-engine and 1 multi-engine.

== Airlines and destinations ==
The following airline offers passenger service:

Airlines	Destinations
Contour Airlines	Chicago–O'Hare

Destination map
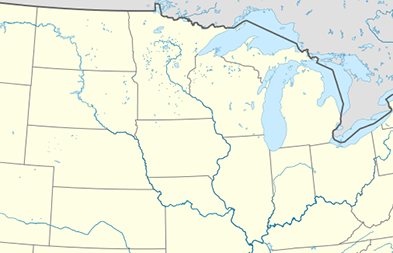
Destinations from Manistee County Blacker Airport
Red = Year-round destination
Green = Seasonal destination
Blue = Future destination

== See also ==
- List of airports in Michigan
