= Altoona–Blair County Airport =

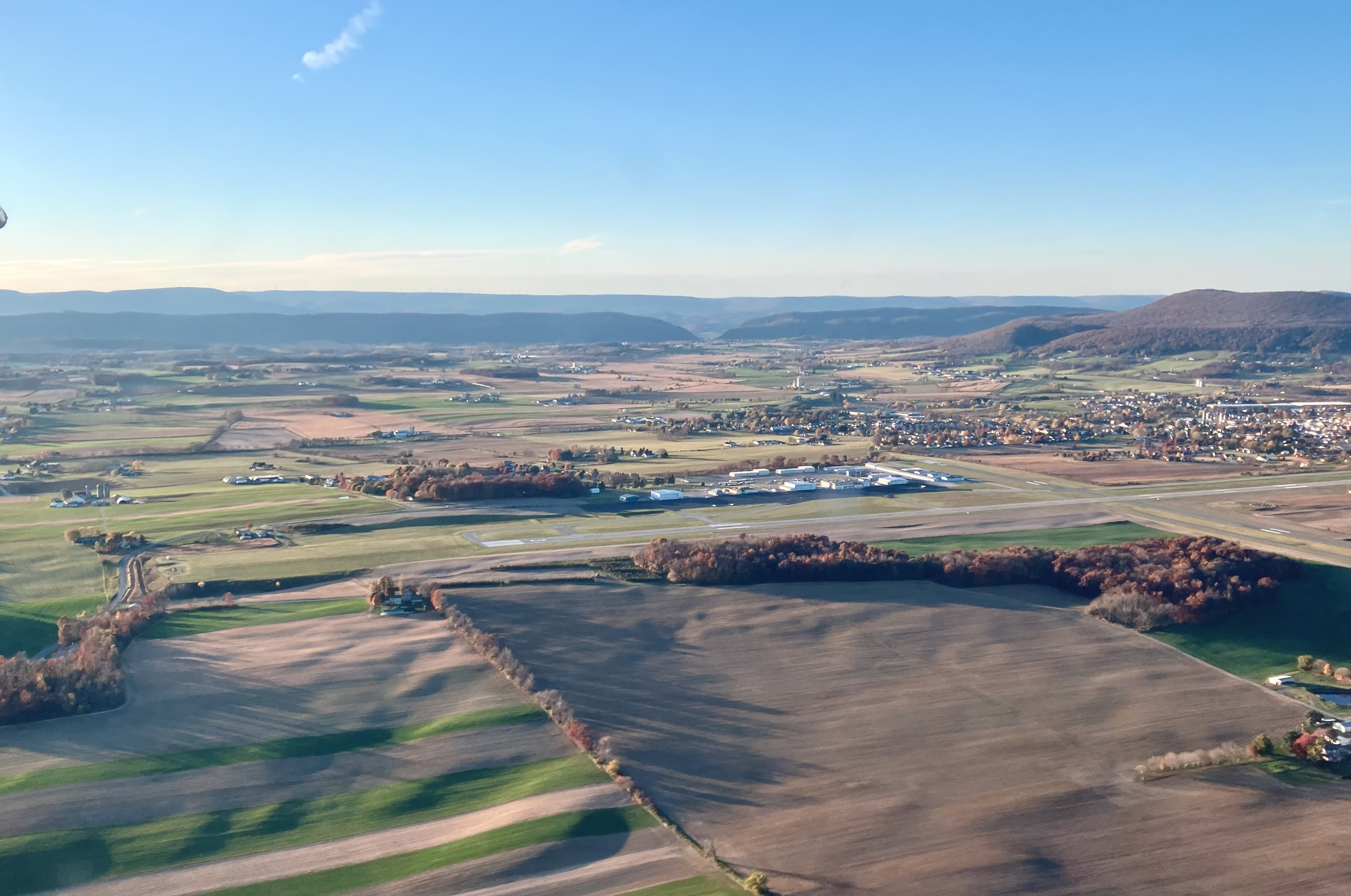
- IATA: AOO; ICAO: KAOO; FAA LID: AOO

Summary
- Airport type: Public
- Owner: Blair County Airport Authority
- Serves: Altoona, Pennsylvania
- Location: Martinsburg, Pennsylvania
- Elevation AMSL: 1,503 ft (458 m)
- Coordinates: 40°17′47″N 078°19′12″W
- Website: flyaltoona.com

Maps
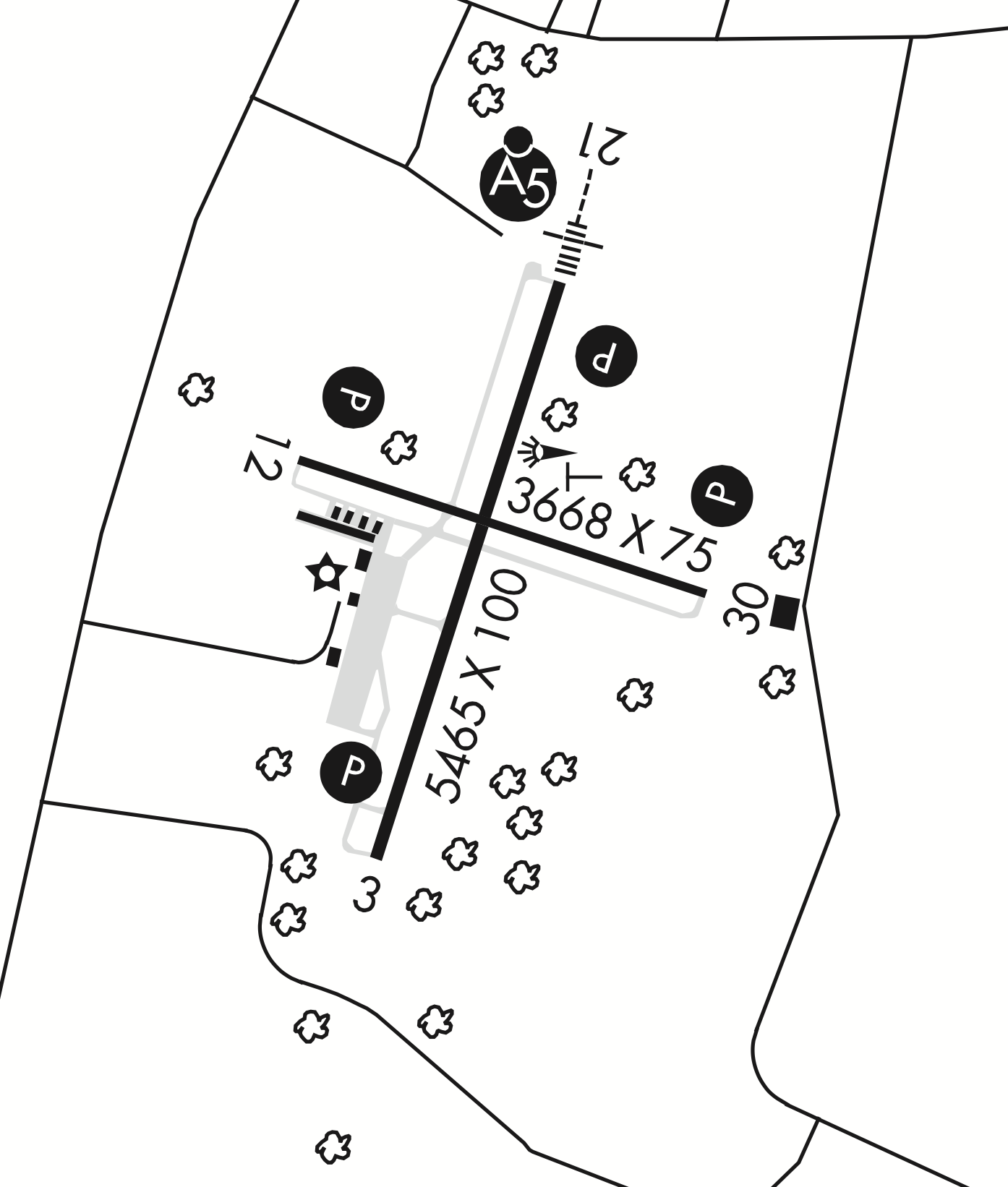
- FAA airport diagram
- Interactive map of Altoona–Blair County Airport

Runways
Direction	Length		Surface
Direction	ft	m	Surface
3/21	5,465	1,666	Asphalt
12/30	3,668	1,118	Asphalt

Statistics (2022)
- Aircraft operations (year ending 3/31/2022): 23,750
- Based aircraft: 28
- Source: Federal Aviation Administration

Altoona–Blair County Airport (IATA: AOO, ICAO: KAOO, FAA LID: AOO) is in Martinsburg, Pennsylvania, 14 miles south of Altoona, in Blair County, Pennsylvania. It is owned by the Blair County Airport Authority. The airport has flights to two destinations, with Charlotte being subsidized by the Essential Air Service program. Seasonal flights to Myrtle Beach are unsubsidized.

Federal Aviation Administration records say the airport had 11,051 passenger boardings (enplanements) in calendar year 2008, 6,439 in 2009 and 4,378 in 2010. The National Plan of Integrated Airport Systems for 2011–2015 categorized it as a primary commercial service airport based on enplanements in 2008 (more than 10,000 per year), but it is a non-primary commercial service airport based on enplanements in 2009 and 2010.

== Facilities ==
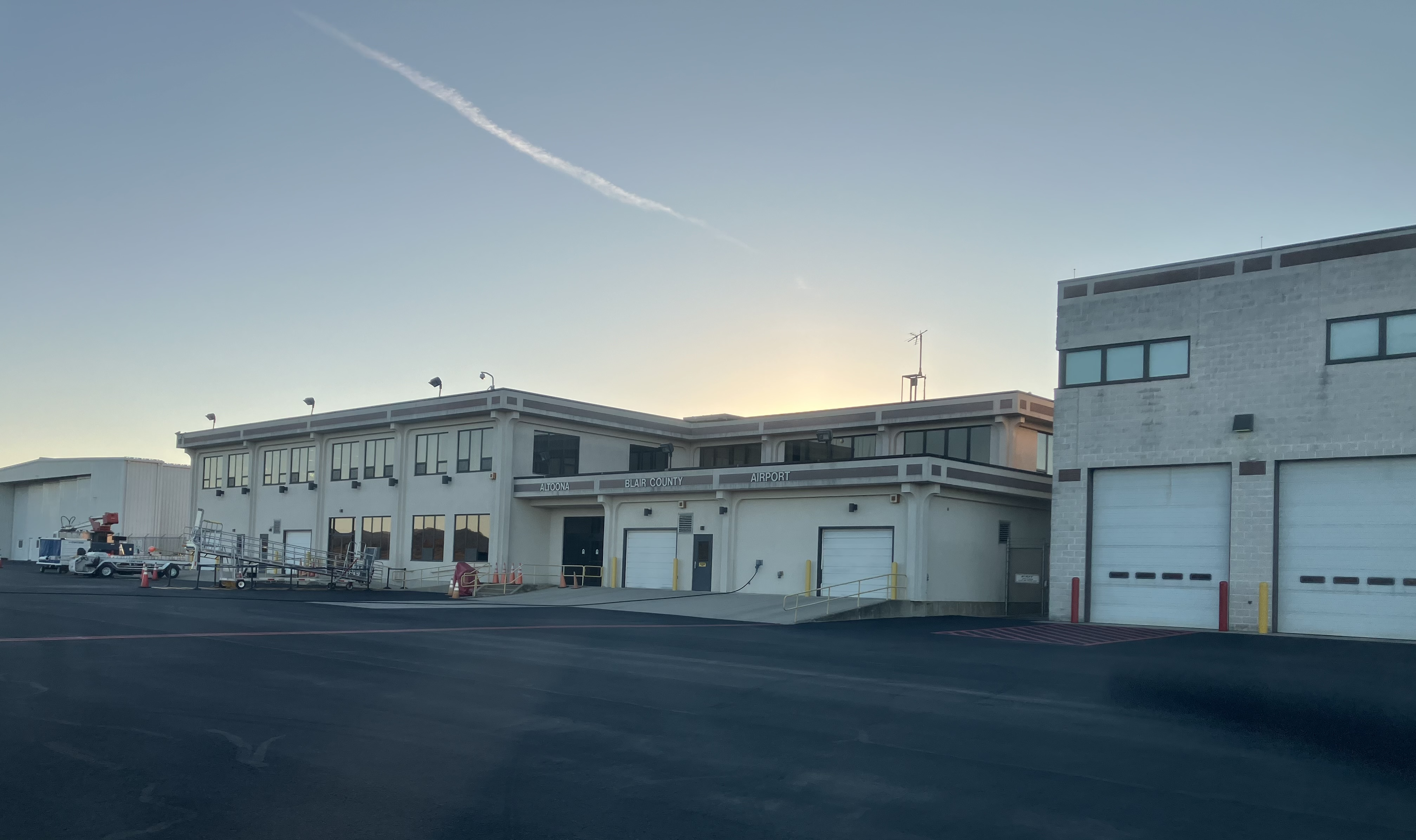
Airport terminal building

The airport covers 320 acres (130 ha) at an elevation of 1,503 feet (458 m). It has two asphalt runways: 3/21 is 5,465 by 100 feet (1,666 x 30 m) and 12/30 is 3,668 by 75 feet (1,118 x 23 m).

In the year ending March 31, 2022, the airport had 23,750 aircraft operations, average 65 per day: 78% general aviation, 22% air taxi, and <1% military. 28 aircraft were then based at the airport: 23 single-engine, 4 multi-engine, and 1 jet.

The airport has 46 T-hangars that it rents to aircraft owners; construction of more is under way. FBO Penn-Air, Inc provided fuel and repair services; it has closed its operation at Altoona–Blair County Airport, and for now fuel services are being performed by the Altoona–Blair County Airport Authority.

The airport has a La Fiesta Restaurant, accessible from the flight line or from the terminal building. The airport also offers car rental through Avis and Budget.

== Airline and destinations ==
Airlines	Destinations	Refs.
Contour Airlines	Charlotte; Seasonal: Myrtle Beach	

US Airways ended non-stop flights to Pittsburgh on July 7, 2007. United Airlines ended non-stop flights to Washington–Dulles on September 30, 2014. The first airline flights were All American Airways DC-3s in 1949; Allegheny Commuter replaced Allegheny's Convair 580s in 1971.

Altoona now has service on Contour Airlines to Charlotte, North Carolina. They previously had service to Philadelphia, but switched to Charlotte in October 2024 to allow more connection opportunities.

== Statistics ==
Carrier shares: (November 2024 - October 2025)
Carrier	Passengers (arriving and departing)
Contour Airlines	20,730(100.00%)

Busiest domestic routes from AOO (January - December 2025)
Rank	City	Passengers	Carriers
1	Charlotte, North Carolina	10,430	Contour

== See also ==
- List of airports in Pennsylvania

== Other sources ==
- Essential Air Service documents (Docket OST-2002-11446) from the U.S. Department of Transportation:
  - Order 2002-9-23 (October 1, 2002): selecting Colgan Air, Inc., to provide subsidized Essential Air Service (EAS) at Altoona and Johnstown, Pennsylvania, for a two-year period at a combined annual subsidy rate of $847,576.
  - Order 2005-4-9 (April 8, 2005): reselects Colgan Air, Inc., d/b/a U.S. Airways Express, to continue providing essential air service (EAS) at Altoona and Johnstown, Pennsylvania, for a two-year period, and establishes a combined subsidy rate of $1,358,551 per year for service consisting of 18 nonstop round trips each week between Altoona and Washington (Dulles), and 18 nonstop round trips each week between Johnstown and Pittsburgh, with 19-seat Beech 1900D aircraft.
  - Order 2007-2-17 (February 16, 2007): selecting Colgan Air Inc., d/b/a US Airways Express, to continue providing essential air service (EAS) at Altoona consisting of 18 weekly nonstop round trips to Washington Dulles, and at Johnstown consisting of 18 weekly nonstop round trips to Pittsburgh. The combined annual subsidy is $2,364,462 based on service with 19-seat Beech 1900D turboprop aircraft for the two-year period beginning June 1, 2007, and all service would be operated as US Airways Express.
  - Order 2008-6-10 (June 10, 2008): re-selecting Colgan Air, Inc. d/b/a United Express, to provide subsidized essential air service (EAS) at Altoona and Johnstown, Pennsylvania, at a total annual subsidy rate of $2,788,845, for the period from June 15, 2008, through June 30, 2010.
  - Order 2010-5-10 (May 10, 2010): selecting Colgan Air Inc., operating as United Express, to provide essential air service (EAS) at Altoona and Johnstown, Pennsylvania, for a combined annual subsidy of $3,348,294, for the two-year period from July 1, 2010 to June 30, 2012.
  - Ninety-Day Notice (March 8, 2012): from Colgan Airlines, Inc. of termination of Essential Air Service at Altoona, Pennsylvania, and Johnstown, Pennsylvania
  - Order 2012-3-14 (March 23, 2012): prohibits Colgan Airlines, Inc. d/b/a United Airlines Express, from terminating service at Altoona and Johnstown, PA; Victoria, TX; Staunton, VA; and Beckley, Clarksburg/Fairmont, and Morgantown, WV, for 30 days beyond the end of the 90-day notice period, i.e. July 8, 2012. We are also requesting proposals by April 25, 2012, from air carriers interested in providing replacement Essential Air Service ("EAS") at Victoria, TX; and Staunton, VA, for a new term, with or without subsidy.
  - Order 2012-4-30 (April 26, 2012): selecting Silver Airways, formerly Gulfstream International Airways, to provide Essential Air Service (EAS) at Altoona and Johnstown, Pennsylvania, to Washington Dulles International Airport, for a combined annual subsidy of $3,997,187.1 Service to be provided will be 18 weekly nonstop and one-stop round trips over an Altoona-Johnstown-Washington Dulles or Johnstown-Altoona-Washington Dulles routing using 34-seat Saab 340 aircraft for the two-year period beginning when the carrier begins full EAS at both communities.
