= Southeast Iowa Regional Airport =

Airport in Iowa, United States

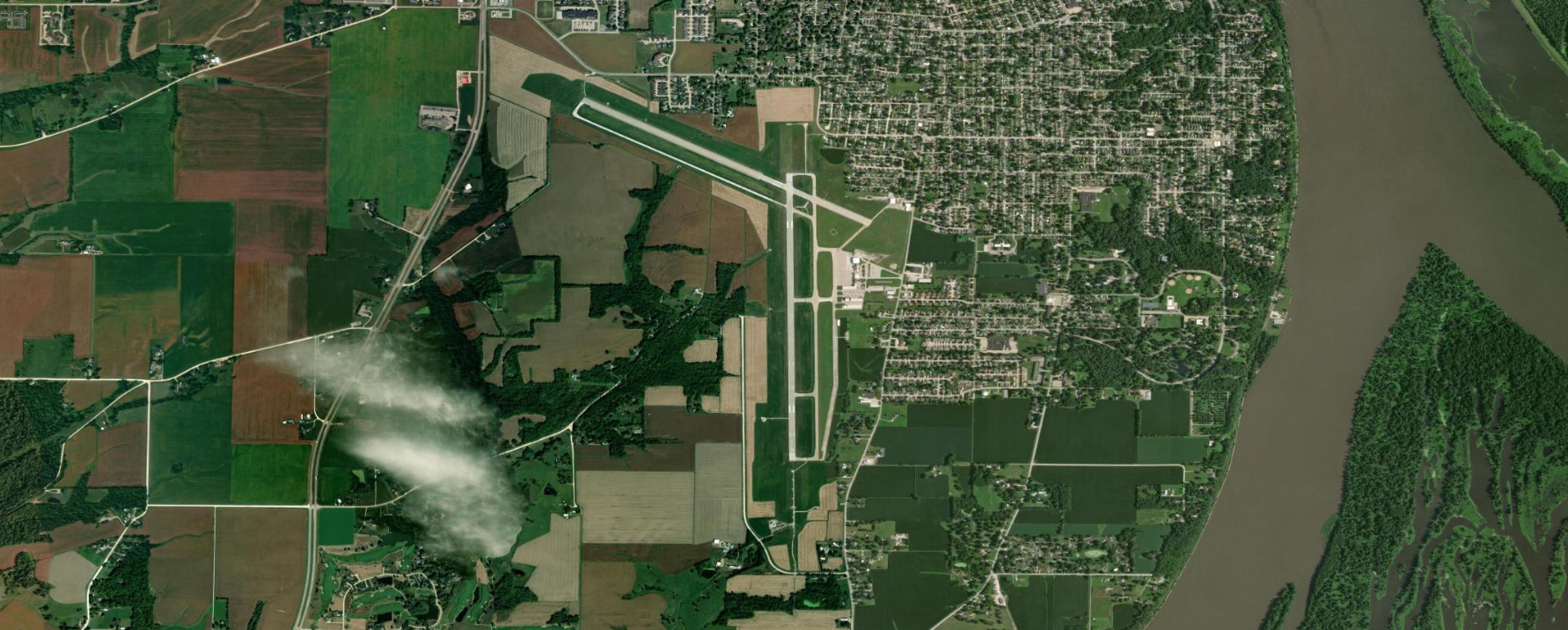
- IATA: BRL; ICAO: KBRL; FAA LID: BRL

Summary
- Airport type: Public
- Owner: Southeast Iowa Regional Airport Authority
- Serves: Burlington, Iowa
- Elevation AMSL: 698 ft (213 m)
- Coordinates: 40°46′59″N 091°07′32″W
- Website: flybrl.com

Maps
- FAA airport diagram

- Location within Iowa Location within the United States

Runways
Direction	Length		Surface
Direction	ft	m	Surface
18/36	6,102	1,860	Asphalt
12/30	5,351	1,631	Concrete

Statistics
- Aircraft operations (2019): 20,172
- Based aircraft (2021): 32
- Departing passengers (12 months ending October 2021): 3,300
- Source: Federal Aviation Administration

Southeast Iowa Regional Airport (IATA: BRL, ICAO: KBRL, FAA LID: BRL) – also known as SIRA – is a public airport located two miles southwest of Burlington, in Des Moines County, Iowa. It is owned by the Southeast Iowa Regional Airport Authority which includes representatives from the city of Burlington, the city of West Burlington, and Des Moines County. The airport is used for general aviation and sees one airline, a service subsidized by the federal government's Essential Air Service program at a cost of $1,917,566 (per year).

The National Plan of Integrated Airport Systems for 2021–2025 categorized it as a non-primary commercial service airport (between 2,500 and 10,000 enplanements per year).

== History ==
The airport launched in 1929 when the Burlington City Council adopted a resolution to establish a municipal airport on an L-shaped 55-acre (22 ha) sod field on Summer Street in Burlington, Iowa. Scheduled passenger service started in 1931 when the National Air Transport company added Burlington to its Chicago to Kansas City route. National's two ten-seat Ford Trimotors made two daily flights to Burlington. Braniff Airlines began two daily departures to Kansas City in 1944; in 1956 Braniff was replaced by Ozark, which pulled out of Burlington in 1982.

In 1943, a contract was signed with the U.S. government to pave the runways and expand the site to 500 acres (200 ha). In 1947 a long-range airport development plan was created for building a Quonset hut administrative building, a U-shaped entrance road with parking, a gasoline service station for aircraft, a tourist court with recreational facilities, a maintenance building and hangars.

The airport's hours of operation were extended in 1959 when runway lights were installed, enabling flights to take off and land at night. In 1967 an aviation easement allowed the north-south runway to be widened and extended 1,351 feet (412 m). The terminal building was remodeled in 1989.

In 1996, the name was changed from Burlington Regional Airport to Southeast Iowa Regional Airport. SIRA employs about 20 people. Passengers report that the laid-back, inviting atmosphere at the airport reminds them of the TV show Wings.

== Facilities and aircraft ==
The airport covers 537 acres (217 ha) at an elevation of 698 feet (213 m). It has two runways: 18/36 is 6,102 by 100 feet (1,860 x 30 m) asphalt and 12/30 is 5,351 by 100 feet (1,631 x 30 m) concrete.

For the year ending July 30, 2019 the airport had 20,172 aircraft operations, an average of 55 per day: 74% general aviation, 16% air taxi, 9% airline and less than 1% military. In December 2021, there were 32 aircraft based at this airport: 28 single-engine, 2 multi-engine, 1 jet and 1 helicopter.

== Airline and destinations ==
=== Passenger ===
Airlines	Destinations
Contour Airlines	Chicago–O'Hare

== Statistics ==
Carrier shares (March 2024 – February 2025)
Carrier	Passengers (arriving and departing)
Southern Airways Express	7,570(100%)

Busiest domestic routes out of BRL (March 2024 – February 2025)
Rank	City	Passengers	Carrier
1	(Illinois) Chicago-O'Hare, IL	2,950	Southern
2	(Missouri) St. Louis, MO	960	Southern

== Accidents and incidents ==
On November 19, 1996 United Express Flight 5925 (operated by Great Lakes Airlines) departed Burlington bound for Quincy, IL. It later collided with a King Air near the runway 4/13 intersection at Quincy Regional Airport. The probable cause was that the King Air pilots did not monitor the Common Traffic Advisory Frequency due to Quincy having very low air traffic. 12 people died in the accident; seven were employees of Dresser Industries in Burlington.

On May 30, 2013, winds from a severe thunderstorm damaged and destroyed several hangars. No one was injured.

== See also ==
- List of airports in Iowa
