= Contour Airlines =

Airline of the United States

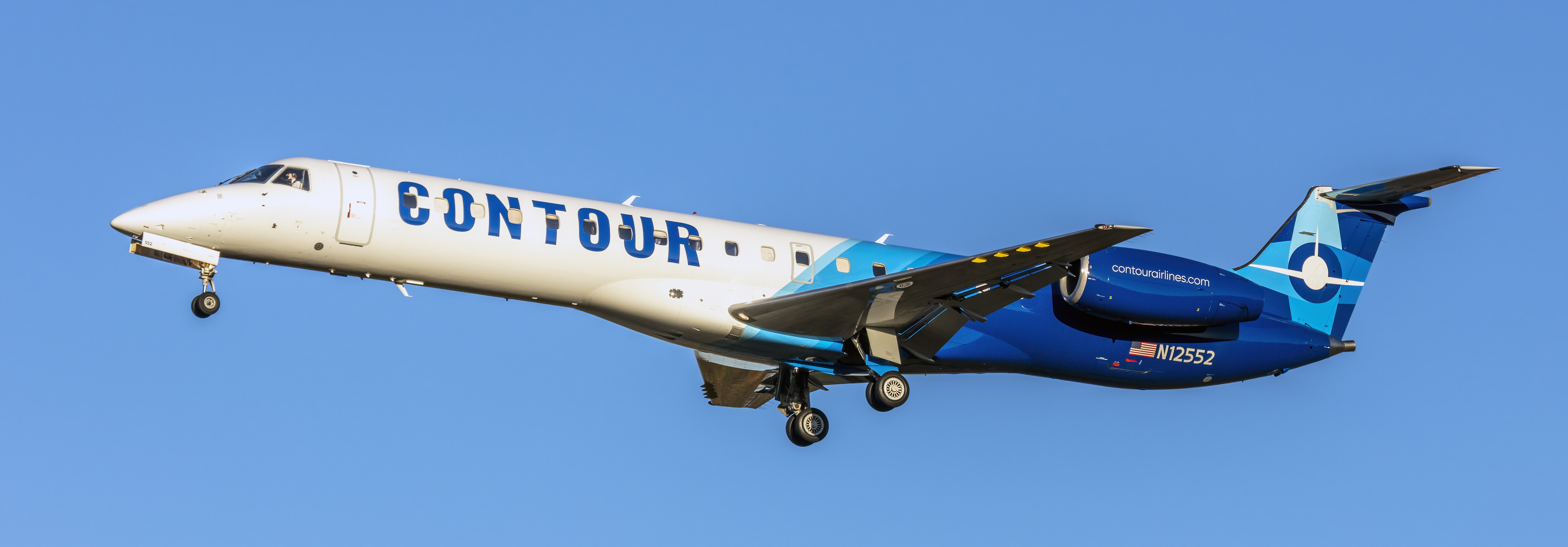
- Contour Airlines Embraer ERJ-145
IATA	ICAO	Call sign
LF	VTE	VOLUNTEER
- Founded: March 22, 2016; 10 years ago
- Commenced operations: April 5, 2016; 10 years ago
- AOC #: FJTA920D
- Fleet size: 31
- Destinations: 38
- Parent company: Contour Aviation (75%); SkyWest, Inc. (25%)
- Headquarters: Smyrna, Tennessee, United States
- Key people: Matt Chaifetz (CEO)
- Employees: 800 (approx.)
- Website: contourairlines.com

Contour Airlines is an independent regional airline headquartered at Smyrna Airport in Smyrna, Tennessee, United States.

Contour Airlines is set up as a public charter operator for regulatory purposes and does not directly operate aircraft. Contour Airlines charters 30-seat regional jets operated by its parent company, Contour Aviation, then resells seats on those aircraft to the public. The arrangement allows Contour to use pilots who are qualified to operate charter services, who can be either less experienced or older than allowed on commercial passenger flights.

== History ==
Contour Airlines was established by its parent company Contour Aviation in 2016. Contour began service on April 5, 2016, completing its inaugural flight from Nashville to Tupelo, Mississippi. On April 1, 2019, Contour retired its Jetstream 31/32 fleet and focused solely on ERJ-135/145 aircraft.

On February 5, 2020, Contour Airlines announced that it would add Indianapolis as a focus city and purchase additional ERJ-135/145 aircraft. The goal was to provide efficient service to markets within driving distance but without direct flights to capture travelers who would rather drive than fly with a layover. The airline planned to serve Nashville, Pittsburgh and St. Louis from Indianapolis beginning June 10, 2020, however, the service had been suspended indefinitely due to the COVID-19 pandemic. On July 28, 2021, Contour announced its relaunch in Indianapolis, beginning on October 12 and flying to Milwaukee, Nashville, and Pittsburgh. However, Contour quietly dropped Milwaukee and Pittsburgh less than three months later. According to Contour CEO Matt Chaifetz, the Indianapolis to Milwaukee route averaged 40% full and was climbing, but stalled in the winter due to fears over the omicron variant. He said "the timing was just poor" for the new routes but said, "We're still committed to Indianapolis."

In early 2024, regional carrier SkyWest Airlines purchased a 25% ownership stake in Contour Airlines to gain access to its infrastructure, personnel, and operational expertise as it launches its own Part 135 operation, SkyWest Charter. SkyWest also plans to supply Contour with CRJ200 aircraft and partner with the airline to both recruit young pilots and provide opportunities to pilots who would otherwise need to retire due to age.

On October 1, 2024, Contour changed multiple routes to new American Airlines hubs. Altoona used to connect to Philadelphia but now connects to Charlotte. Fort Leonard Wood and Cape Girardeau changed from Nashville to Chicago.

In January 2025, Contour appointed Ben Munson as president. He will report to CEO Matt Chaifetz.

== Corporate affairs ==
As of 2024, Contour Airlines employs approximately 800 people across its operations. Matt Chaifetz is the current president and chief executive officer; leading the company since its founding in 2016. Contour currently employs nearly 200 pilots, all reporting to Greg Engel, the Chief Pilot.

=== Corporate headquarters ===
Contour Airlines' Corporate Headquarters is located at 808 Blue Angel Way, on the grounds of Smyrna Airport (MQY) in Smyrna, Tennessee, a suburb of Nashville. The facility serves as the nerve center for the airline's operations and administrative functions. In addition, it is the home of the Systems Operations Control Center (SOC), the Inflight Services Training Center (IFS), the Reservations Call Center (RES), and various other administrative offices. This centralized location allows for efficient coordination between different departments, supporting Contour Airlines' operations across its network.

== Destinations ==
As of February 2026, Contour Airlines operates flights serving the following destinations:

=== Caribbean ===
City	Airport	IATA Code	Destinations	Notes
Dominica
Dominica	Douglas–Charles Airport	DOM	Port of Spain Saint Thomas San Juan	
Puerto Rico
San Juan	Luis Muñoz Marín International Airport	SJU	Dominica Port of Spain St. Maarten	
Sint Maarten
Sint Maarten	Princess Juliana International Airport	SXM	San Juan St. Thomas	
(Trinidad and Tobago) Trinidad & Tobago
Port of Spain	Piarco International Airport	POS	Dominica San Juan St. Thomas	
(Saint Thomas, U.S. Virgin Islands) US Virgin Islands
St. Thomas	Cyril E. King Airport	STT	Dominica Port of Spain Sint Maarten	

=== United States ===
City	Airport	IATA Code	Destinations	Notes
Arkansas
El Dorado	South Arkansas Regional Airport at Goodwin Field	ELD	Dallas/Fort Worth	EAS community
Alabama
Muscle Shoals	Northwest Alabama Regional Airport	MSL	Charlotte Dallas/Fort Worth Pensacola (seasonal)	AEAS community
Arizona
Page	Page Municipal Airport	PGA	Denver (seasonal) Las Vegas Phoenix	AEAS community
Phoenix	Phoenix Sky Harbor International Airport	PHX	Page Show Low Vernal	
Show Low	Show Low Regional Airport	SOW	Phoenix	AEAS community
California
Los Angeles	Los Angeles International Airport	LAX	Merced	
Merced	Merced Regional Airport	MCE	Las Vegas Los Angeles	EAS community
Colorado
Denver	Denver International Airport	DEN	Carlsbad Page (seasonal) Ruidoso Taos Vernal	
Florida
Orlando/Sanford	Orlando Sanford International Airport	SFB	Cape Girardeau	Seasonal service
Pensacola	Pensacola International Airport	PNS	Cape Girardeau Muscle Shoals	Seasonal service
Fort Lauderdale	Fort Lauderdale–Hollywood International Airport	FLL	Macon	
(Georgia (U.S. state)) Georgia
Atlanta	Hartsfield–Jackson Atlanta International Airport	ATL	DuBois	Service starts February 1, 2027
Macon	Middle Georgia Regional Airport	MCN	Baltimore Fort Lauderdale Nashville (service starts March 1, 2027)	AEAS community
Illinois
Chicago	O'Hare International Airport	ORD	Burlington Cape Girardeau DuBois (service starts February 1, 2027) Kirksville Manistee Quincy	
Quincy	Quincy Regional Airport	UIN	Chicago/O'Hare Nashville	AEAS community
Iowa
Burlington	Southeast Iowa Regional Airport	BRL	Chicago/O'Hare	AEAS community
Maryland
Baltimore	Baltimore/Washington International Airport	BWI	Macon	
Michigan
Manistee	Manistee County Blacker Airport	MBL	Chicago/O'Hare	AEAS community
Mississippi
Tupelo	Tupelo Regional Airport	TUP	Nashville Dallas/Fort Worth	AEAS community
Missouri
Cape Girardeau	Cape Girardeau Regional Airport	CGI	Chicago/O'Hare Dallas/Fort Worth Orlando/Sanford (seasonal) Pensacola (seasonal)	EAS community
Fort Leonard Wood	Waynesville-St. Robert Regional Airport	TBN	Dallas/Fort Worth Nashville	EAS community
Kirksville	Kirksville Regional Airport	IRK	Chicago/O'Hare Dallas/Fort Worth	EAS community
Nevada
Las Vegas	Harry Reid International Airport	LAS	Merced Page	
New Mexico
Albuquerque	Albuquerque International Sunport	ABQ	Carlsbad	
Carlsbad	Cavern City Air Terminal	CNM	Albuquerque Denver	EAS community
Ruidoso	Sierra Blanca Regional Airport	RUI/SRR	Denver	
Taos	Taos Regional Airport	TSM	Denver	
(New York (state)) New York
Plattsburgh	Plattsburgh International Airport	PBG	Washington/Dulles	AEAS community
North Carolina
Charlotte	Charlotte Douglas International Airport	CLT	Altoona Beckley Muscle Shoals Parkersburg Williamsport	
Pennsylvania
Altoona	Altoona–Blair County Airport	AOO	Charlotte Myrtle Beach (seasonal)	AEAS community
DuBois	DuBois Regional Airport	DUJ	Atlanta Chicago/O'Hare	EAS community. Service starts February 1, 2027.
Williamsport	Williamsport Regional Airport	IPT	Charlotte	
South Carolina
Myrtle Beach	Myrtle Beach International Airport	MYR	Altoona Beckley	Seasonal service
Tennessee
Nashville	Nashville International Airport	BNA	Fort Leonard Wood Macon (starts March 1, 2027) Quincy Tupelo	
Texas
Dallas/Fort Worth	Dallas/Fort Worth International Airport	DFW	Cape Girardeau El Dorado Fort Leonard Wood Muscle Shoals Tupelo	
Utah
Vernal	Vernal Regional Airport	VEL	Denver Phoenix	
Virginia
Washington D.C.	Dulles International Airport	IAD	Plattsburgh	
West Virginia
Beckley	Raleigh County Airport	BKW	Charlotte Myrtle Beach (seasonal)	AEAS community
Parkersburg	Mid-Ohio Valley Regional Airport	PKB	Charlotte	

=== Discontinued destinations ===
City	Airport	IATA Code	Destinations	Notes
California
Crescent City	Del Norte County Airport	CEC	Oakland	Replaced by Advanced Air on March 17, 2024.
Oakland	Oakland San Francisco Bay Airport	OAK	Crescent City Santa Barbara	Replaced by Advanced Air on March 17, 2024.
Palm Springs	Palm Springs International Airport	PSP	Sacramento (Seasonal)	Ended due to COVID-19 pandemic
Sacramento	Sacramento International Airport	SMF	Palm Springs (seasonal) Santa Barbara	Ended due to COVID-19 pandemic
San Luis Obispo	San Luis Obispo County Regional Airport	SBP	Las Vegas	Ended due to COVID-19 pandemic
Santa Barbara	Santa Barbara Municipal Airport	SBA	Las Vegas Oakland Sacramento	Ended due to COVID-19 pandemic
Florida
Destin	Destin–Fort Walton Beach Airport	VPS	Bowling Green	Ended due to low demand
Tampa	Tampa International Airport	TPA	Charlotte Macon	Ended due to low demand
(Georgia (U.S. state)) Georgia
Atlanta	Hartsfield–Jackson Atlanta International Airport	ATL	Bowling Green	Ended due to low demand
Illinois
Marion	Veterans Airport of Southern Illinois	MWA	Chicago/O'Hare	Ended September 9, 2026, replaced by American Airlines
Indiana
Indianapolis	Indianapolis International Airport	IND	Milwaukee Nashville Pittsburgh	Ended due to COVID-19 pandemic
Kentucky
Bowling Green	Bowling Green–Warren County Regional Airport	BWG	Atlanta Destin-Fort Walton	Ended due to low demand
Owensboro	Owensboro-Daviess County Regional Airport	OWB	Charlotte Chicago/O'Hare	Ended October 12, 2026, replaced by SkyWest Airlines
Paducah	Barkley Regional Airport	PAH	Charlotte	Ended February 23, 2026, replaced by SkyWest Airlines
Mississippi
Greenville	Greenville Mid-Delta Airport	GLH	Dallas/Fort Worth Nashville	Ended September 30, 2025, replaced by Denver Air Connection
Missouri
St. Louis	St. Louis Lambert International Airport	STL	Fort Leonard Wood	
(New York (state)) New York
Ogdensburg	Ogdensburg International Airport	OGS	Philadelphia	Replaced by Breeze Airways on October 1, 2024.
Pennsylvania
Philadelphia	Philadelphia International Airport	PHL	Altoona Ogdensburg Plattsburgh	Ended April 30, 2025. Replaced by Washington/Dulles.
Pittsburgh	Pittsburgh International Airport	PIT	Indianapolis Milwaukee	Ended due to low demand
Utah
Moab	Canyonlands Regional Airport	CNY	Denver Phoenix	Ended September 30, 2026, replaced by SkyWest Airlines.
Virginia
Shenandoah	Shenandoah Valley Regional Airport	SHD	Charlotte	Ended February 1, 2026, replaced by SkyWest Airlines
West Virginia
Clarksburg	North Central West Virginia Airport	CKB	Charlotte	Ended April 13, 2026, replaced by SkyWest Airlines
Lewisburg	Greenbrier Valley Airport	LWB	Charlotte	Ended February 8, 2026, replaced by SkyWest Airlines
Wisconsin
Milwaukee	Milwaukee Mitchell International Airport	MKE	Indianapolis Pittsburgh	Ended due to low demand

== Fleet ==
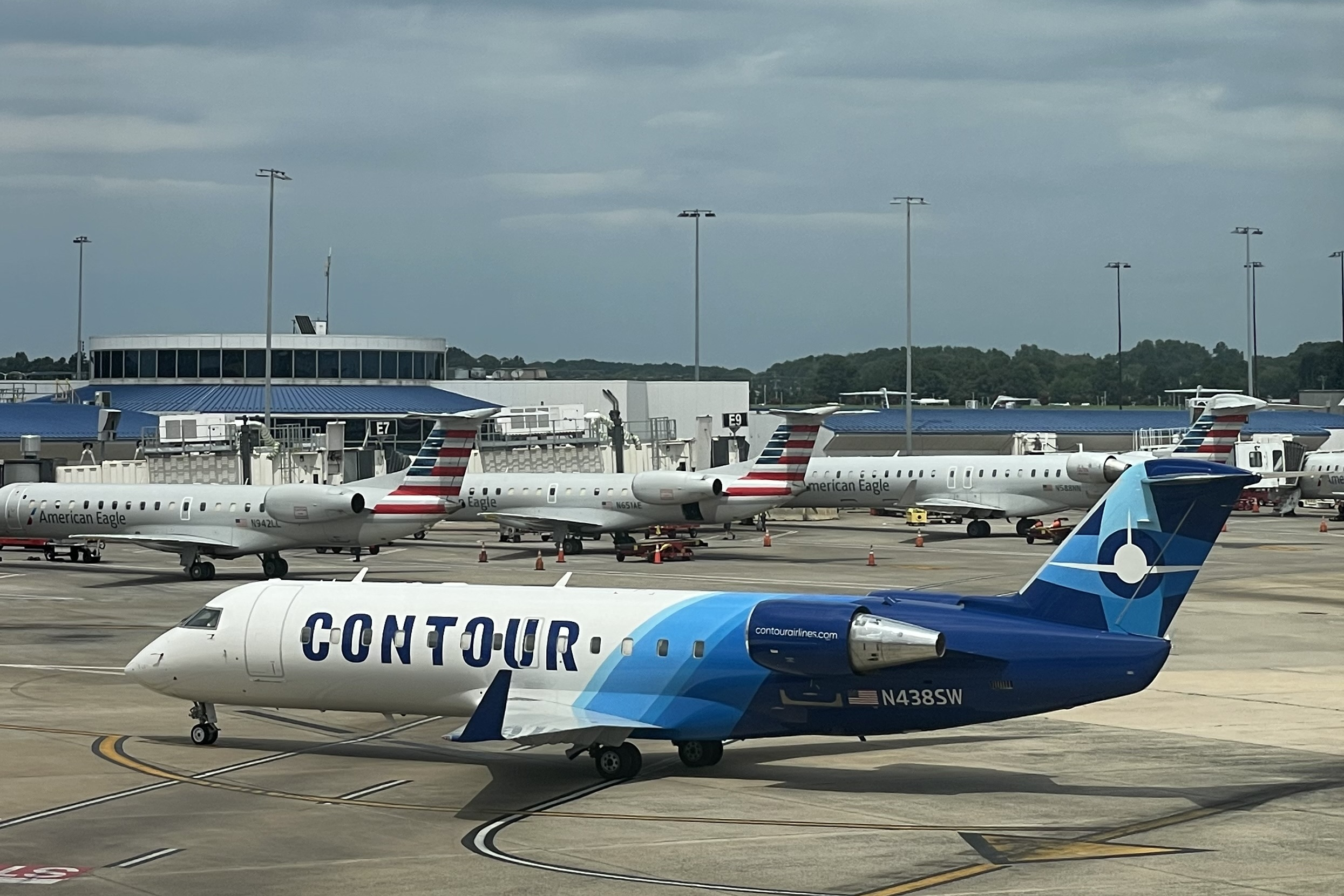
Contour Airlines CRJ200 in Charlotte

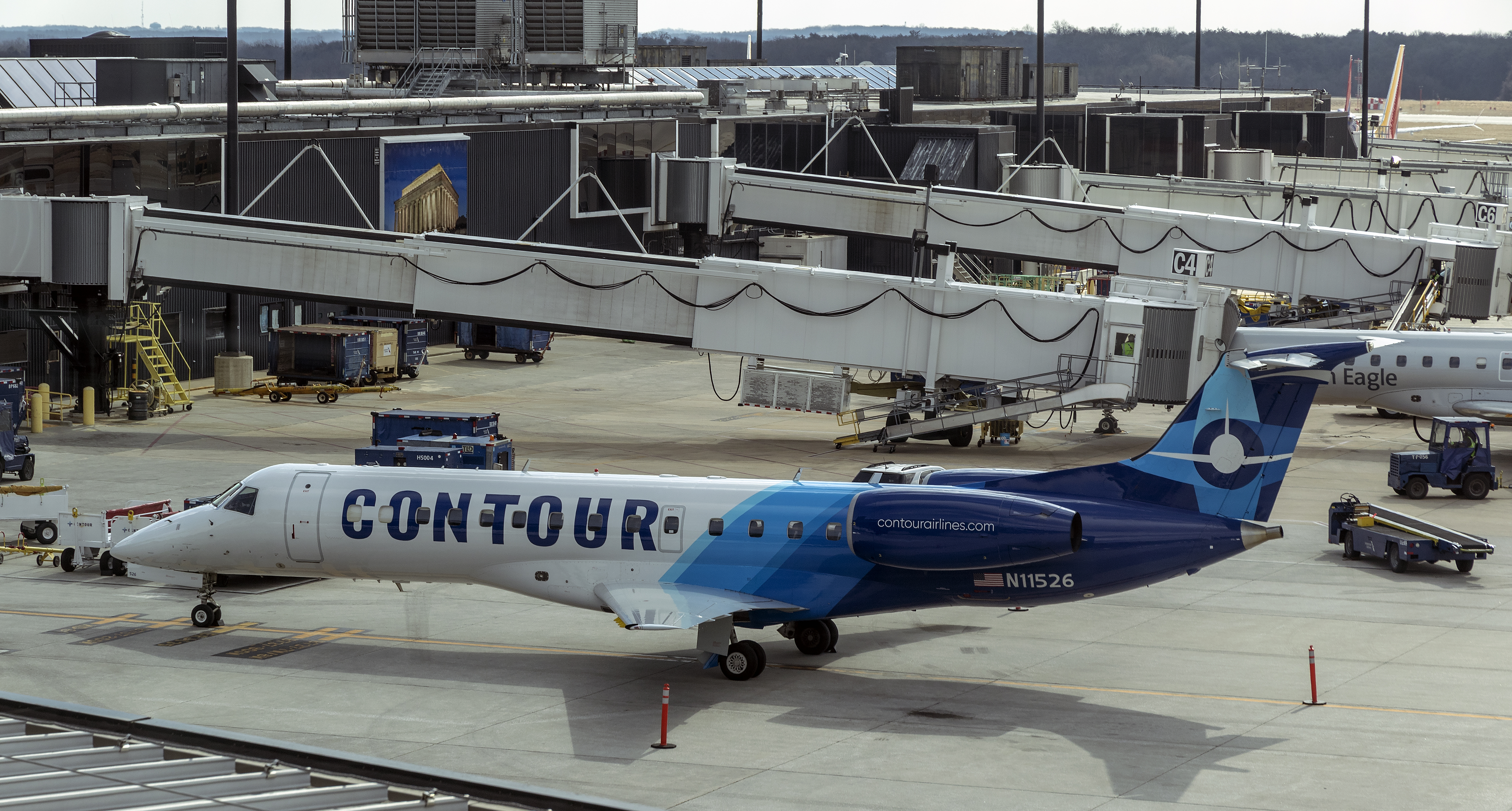
Contour Airlines ERJ 135 in Baltimore

As of September 2025, Contour uses a variety of regional jets in a 30-seat configuration under the Corporate Flight Management certificate.

Aircraft	In service	Orders	Passengers
Bombardier CRJ200	10	—	30
Embraer ERJ 135	10	—	30
Embraer ERJ 140	8	—	30
Embraer ERJ 145	3	—	30
Fleet total	31	—	120

Contour Airlines also formerly operated seven British Aerospace Jetstream 31 and four British Aerospace Jetstream 41 aircraft.

== Services ==
=== Interline agreement ===
Contour has had an interline agreement with American Airlines since October 2019, allowing passengers to travel via Contour and American under a single itinerary. Bookings can be made through third-party travel agencies, through the American Airlines website, or directly through the Contour Airlines website.

Since April 2024, Contour has had an interline agreement with Alaska Airlines. Passengers who book through Alaska Airlines are eligible to earn miles for Atmos Rewards when flying Contour.

Since October 2024, Contour and United Airlines have had an interline agreement.

In February 2025, Contour and JetBlue signed a new interline agreement that allow customers to book for single itineraries. This agreement allows Contour to access for more than 100 destinations served by JetBlue in the Americas, while extending JetBlue's reach into smaller and underserved regional markets served by Contour.

=== In-flight experience ===
Passengers traveling with Contour receive free seat selection. All Contour flights feature leather seating, 36 inches of legroom, and complimentary in-flight snack and beverage service.
