= Contour Aviation =

Aviation services company in the United States

IATA	ICAO	Call sign
LF	VTE	VOLUNTEER
- Founded: July 26, 1982; 44 years ago
- Subsidiaries: Contour Airlines (75%)
- Fleet size: 38
- Headquarters: Smyrna, Tennessee, United States
- Key people: Matt Chaifetz (CEO)
- Website: contouraviation.com

Corporate Flight Management, Inc., doing business as Contour Aviation, is an aviation services company based in Smyrna, Tennessee, United States. It started operations in 1982 as an on-demand charter service for passengers and freight in the southern United States, as well as a full-service Federal Aviation Administration certificated repair station and a fixed-base operator. Contour maintains its corporate office at the Smyrna Airport. It currently operates charter flights, provides aircraft management, sales, government services, and maintenance, repair and overhaul (MRO) services.

Contour Aviation is the parent company of Contour Airlines, a public charter operator which provides scheduled domestic service like a regional airline. Contour Airlines charters 30-seat Embraer regional jets operated by Contour Aviation and then resells seats on that aircraft to the public. The arrangement allows Contour to use pilots who are qualified to operate charter services, who can be either less experienced or older than allowed on commercial passenger flights.

== Fleet ==
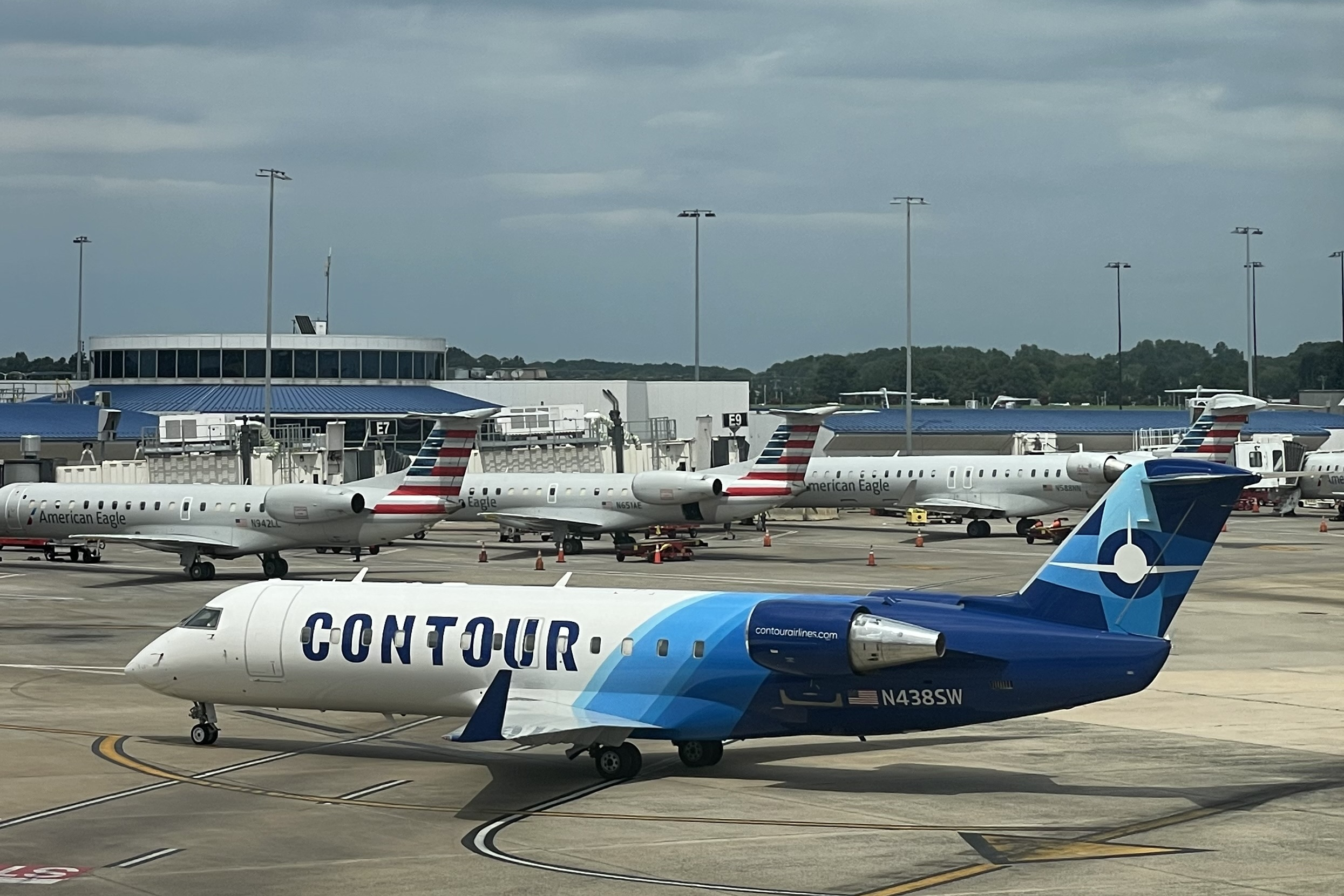
Contour Airlines CRJ200 in Charlotte

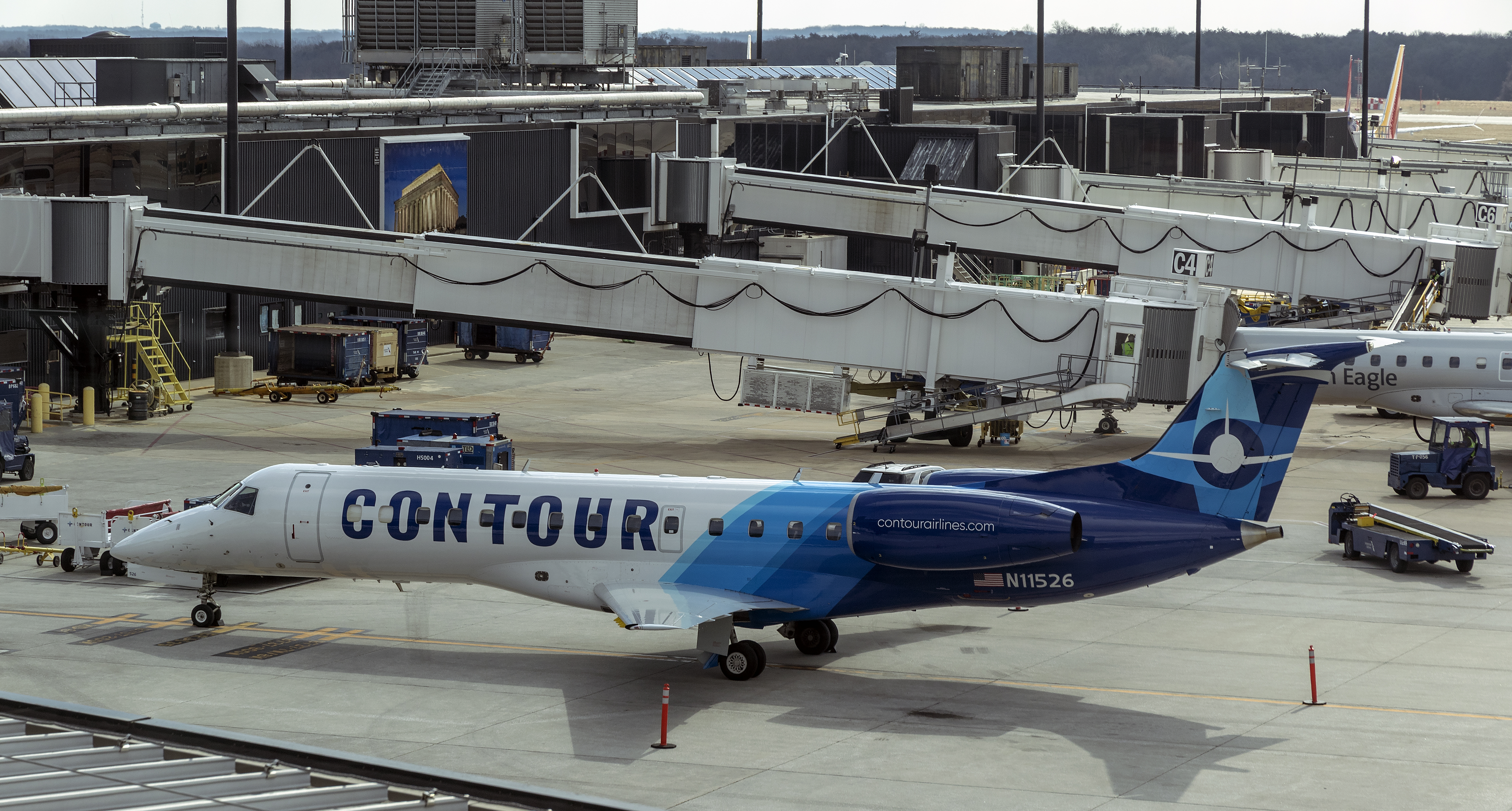
Contour Airlines ERJ 135 in Baltimore

As of December 2025, Contour Aviation fleet includes the following aircraft:

Aircraft	In service	Orders	Passengers	Notes
Bombardier CRJ100	1	—	16	Used to operate private jet charter flights.
Bombardier CRJ200	10	—	30	Used to operate Contour Airlines flights.
Bombardier CRJ200	3	—	16	Used to operate private jet charter flights.
Bombardier Challenger 850	1	—	15	Used to operate private jet charter flights.
Cessna Citation Excel	1	—	8	Used to operate private jet charter flights.
Embraer Legacy 600	1	—	13	Used to operate private jet charter flights.
Embraer ERJ 135	10	—	30	Used to operate Contour Airlines flights.
Embraer ERJ 140	8	—	30	Used to operate Contour Airlines flights.
Embraer ERJ 145	3	—	30	Used to operate Contour Airlines flights.
Total	38	—		
