= Elkhart Municipal Airport =

Airport in Elkhart County, Indiana, United States

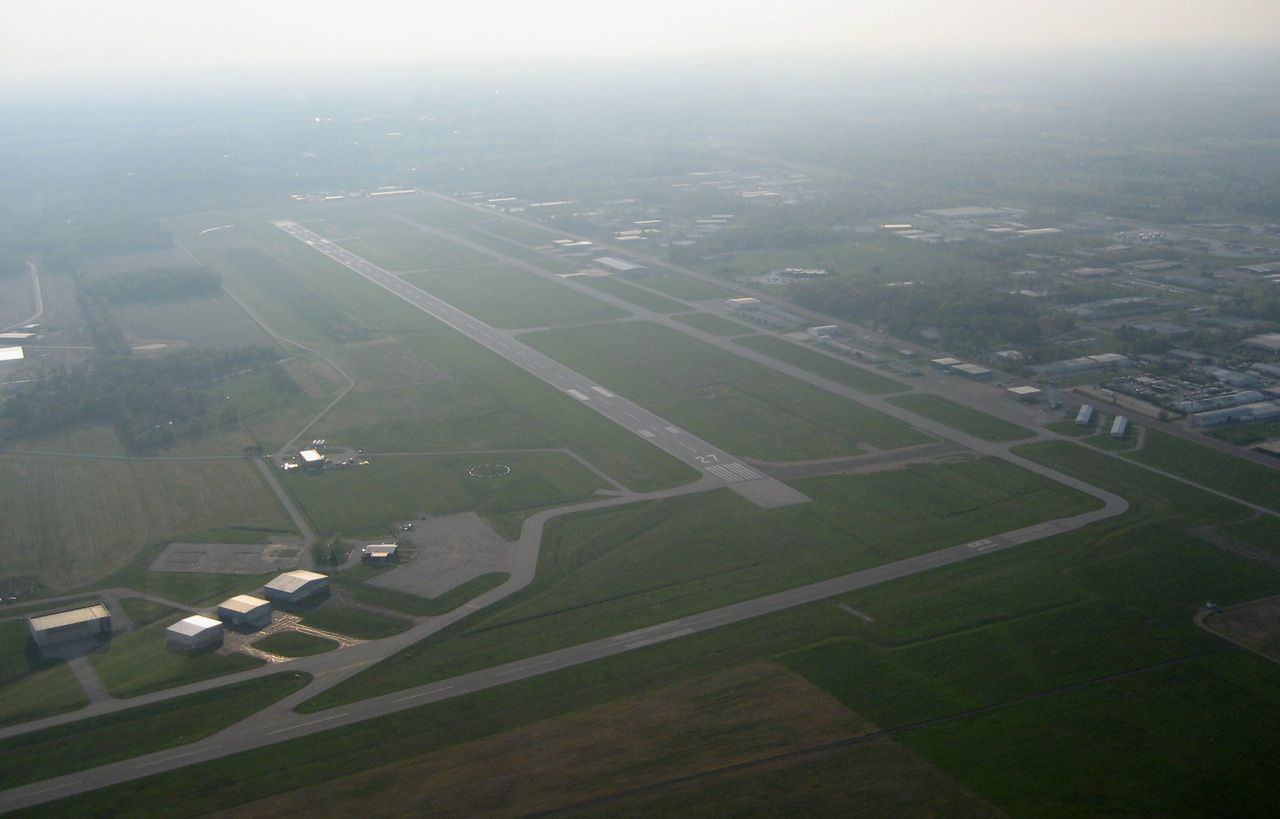
- Aerial view of the airport, facing northwest
- IATA: EKI; ICAO: KEKM; FAA LID: EKM

Summary
- Airport type: Public
- Owner: City of Elkhart
- Serves: Elkhart, Indiana
- Elevation AMSL: 778 ft (237 m)
- Coordinates: 41°43′10″N 086°00′12″W

Map
- Location of airport in Indiana EKM (the United States)

Runways
| Direction | Length | | Surface |
| Direction | ft | m | Surface |
|---|---|---|---|
| 9/27 | 6,500 | 1,981 | Asphalt |
| 18/36 | 4,001 | 1,220 | Asphalt |
| 8/26 | 2,500 | 762 | Turf |

Statistics (2005)
- Aircraft operations: 33,211
- Based aircraft: 73
- Source: Federal Aviation Administration

Elkhart Municipal Airport (IATA: EKI, ICAO: KEKM, FAA LID: EKM) is a city-owned public-use airport located three nautical miles (6 km) northwest of the central business district of Elkhart, a city in Elkhart County, Indiana, United States.

Although most U.S. airports use the same three-letter location identifier for the FAA and IATA, Elkhart Municipal Airport is assigned EKM by the FAA and EKI by the IATA. The airport's ICAO identifier is KEKM. The original IATA code was EKH and was changed to EKI in the early 1970s.

== Facilities and aircraft ==
Elkhart Municipal Airport covers an area of 640 acres (260 ha) at an elevation of 778 feet (237 m) above mean sea level. It has two asphalt paved runways: 9/27 is 6,500 by 120 feet (1,981 x 37 m) and 18/36 is 4,001 by 75 feet (1,220 x 23 m). It also has one turf runway designated 8/26 which measures 2,500 by 100 feet (762 x 30 m).

For the 12-month period ending December 31, 2005, the airport had 33,211 aircraft operations, an average of 90 per day: 96% general aviation, 3% air taxi and 1% military. At that time there were 73 aircraft based at this airport: 62% single-engine, 23% multi-engine, 8% jet, 4% helicopter and 3% military.

== Historical airline service ==
- Air Wisconsin - provided service from the 1970s through 1987 to Chicago O'Hare Airport as well as Detroit, the latter with a stop at either Battle Creek, MI or Fort Wayne, IN. The airline became a feeder carrier for United Airlines in 1985 and flights then operated as United Express.
- Simmons Airlines dba Northwest Airlink provided service to Detroit for a short time in 1987.
- Iowa Airways, dba Midway Connection, a feeder carrier for Midway Airlines (1976-1991) operated flights to Chicago Midway Airport from 1987 until the service ended in 1990.

== See also ==
- List of airports in Indiana
