= Fatigue (disambiguation) =

Fatigue is a subjective feeling of tiredness or exhaustion or loss of energy in humans.

Fatigue may also refer to:

== Medical ==
- Central nervous system fatigue, changes in the synaptic concentration of neurotransmitters which affects exercise performance and muscle function
  - Synaptic fatigue
- Chronic fatigue, long-term fatigue that limits a person's energy or ability to carry out daily activities, also known as central fatigue
- Cancer-related fatigue, a side effect of chemotherapy, radiation therapy, and biotherapy
- Compassion fatigue, a lessening of compassion common among those who work with trauma victims
- Muscle fatigue, the decline in ability of a muscle to generate force, also known as peripheral fatigue
- Battle fatigue/Combat fatigue, an outdated term for:
  - Combat stress reaction, a military term for short-term behavioral disorganization
  - Post-traumatic stress disorder, a medical term for a long-term disorder
- Effects of fatigue on safety in transportation and shift work
  - Pilot fatigue
  - Sleep-deprived driving

== Other uses ==
- Alarm fatigue, psychological consequence of overuse of alarms
- Decision fatigue, deteriorating quality of decisions made by an individual after a long session of decision making
- Fatigue (album), a 2021 album by L'Rain.
- Fatigue (material), the initiation and propagation of cracks in a material due to cyclic loading
- Fatigue (safety), implications of tiredness in many fields, especially transportation
- Fatigue duty, work assigned to military men that does not require the use of armament.
- Fatigue Mountain, on the border of Alberta and British Columbia, Canada
- Information fatigue, impairment caused by excessive information
- Voter fatigue, public apathy about elections

== See also ==
- Fatigues (disambiguation), for topics known by the term fatigues (plural)
- Metal Fatigue (disambiguation)
