= Owensboro–Daviess County Regional Airport =

Small airport in Kentucky

Owensboro–Daviess County Airport
- IATA: OWB; ICAO: KOWB; FAA LID: OWB

Summary
- Airport type: Public
- Owner: Owensboro City & Daviess County
- Serves: Owensboro, Kentucky
- Elevation AMSL: 407 ft (124 m)
- Coordinates: 37°44′20″N 087°10′01″W
- Website: flyowb.com

Maps
- FAA airport diagram
- Interactive map of Owensboro–Daviess County Airport

Runways
Direction	Length		Surface
Direction	ft	m	Surface
18/36	8,000	2,438	Concrete
6/24	5,000	1,524	Asphalt/Concrete

Statistics
- Aircraft operations (2018): 19,991
- Based aircraft (2019): 49
- Source: Federal Aviation Administration

Owensboro–Daviess County Airport (IATA: OWB, ICAO: KOWB, FAA LID: OWB) is a public use airport located three miles southwest of Owensboro, in Daviess County, Kentucky, United States. The airport is owned by both the city and county. One airline schedules passenger flights, subsidized by the Essential Air Service program.

Federal Aviation Administration records say this airport had 23,537 passenger boardings (enplanements) in calendar year 2016. The National Plan of Integrated Airport Systems for 2017–2021 categorized it as a primary commercial service airport.

== Facilities ==
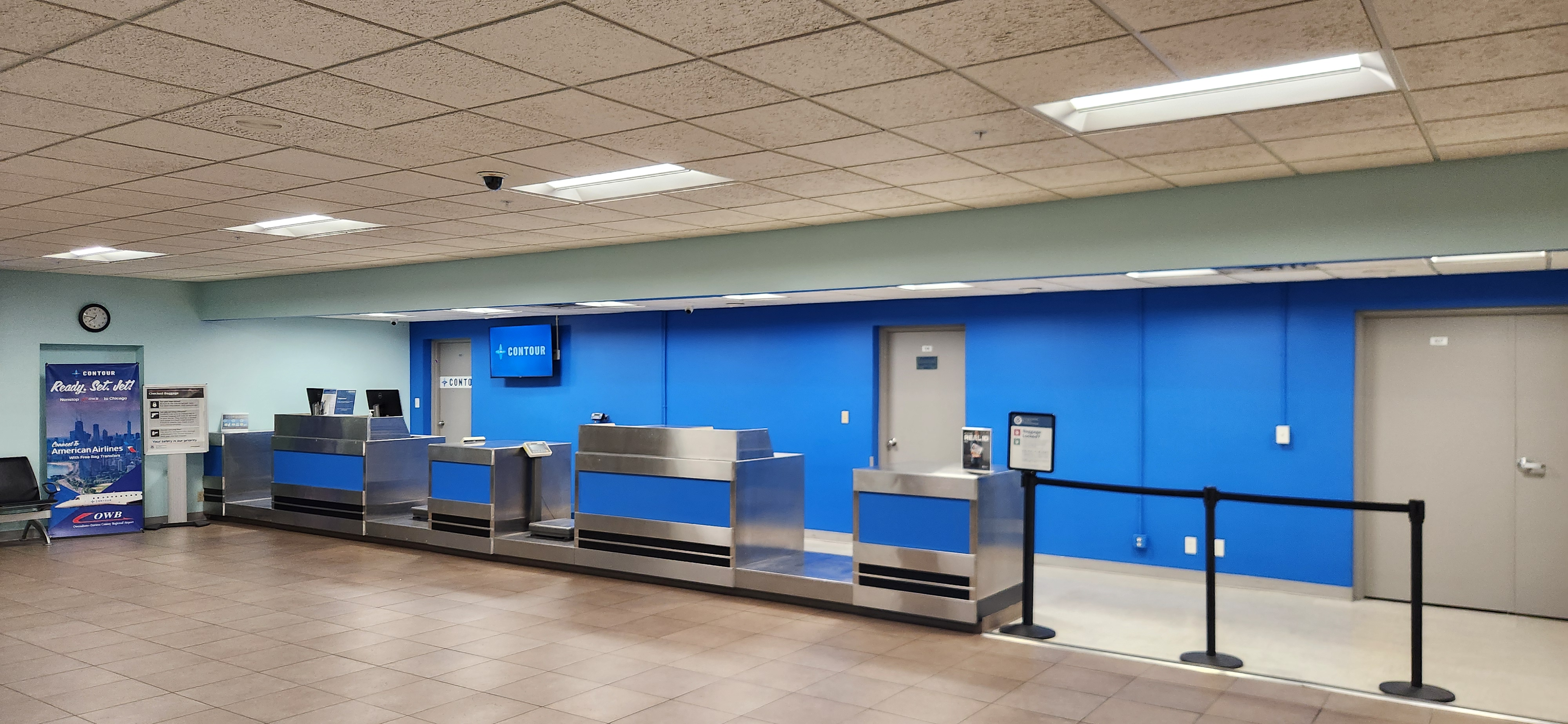
OWB ticketing facilities

Owensboro–Daviess County Airport covers 880 acres (356 ha) at an elevation of 407 feet (124 m). It has two runways: 18/36 is 8,000 by 150 feet (2,438 x 46 m) concrete and 6/24 is 5,000 by 100 feet (1,524 x 30 m) asphalt/concrete.

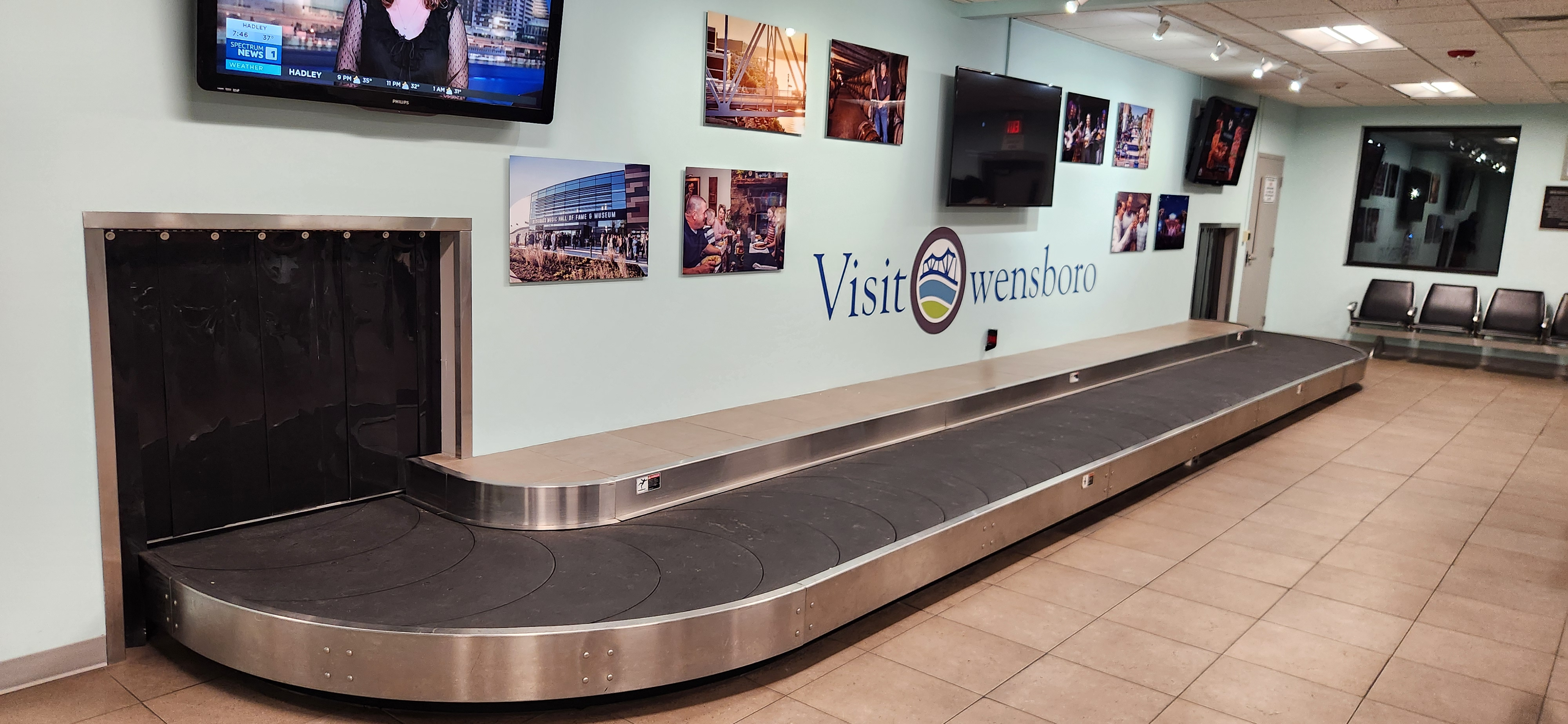
Baggage claim at OWB

In the year ending April 30, 2018 the airport had 19,991 aircraft operations, an average of 55 per day: 76% general aviation, 13% air taxi, 10% military, and 1% commercial airline. In June 2019, 49 aircraft were based at this airport: 35 single-engine, 6 multi-engine, 7 jet and 1 ultralight.

== Airlines and destinations ==
=== Passenger ===
Airlines	Destinations
United Express	Chicago–O'Hare, Washington–Dulles

=== History ===
Eastern Airlines landed at Owensboro from 1951 to 1964, and Ozark Airlines from 1955 to 1975 (including DC-9s circa 1972). Air Kentucky served the airport in the 1970s and 1980s, including under the Allegheny Commuter banner in later years.

RegionsAir operating as AmericanConnection flew to St. Louis until March 2007. The next EAS contract was awarded to Big Sky Airlines (Delta Connection), with service to Cincinnati scheduled to begin in June 2007. Big Sky began service in November 2007 and abruptly ended operations in January 2008. Great Lakes Aviation was awarded a contract but ultimately cancelled. Owensboro was without scheduled air service from January 7, 2008, until August 31, 2009, when Pacific Wings operating as KentuckySkies was awarded the Essential Air Service contract offering flights to Nashville. On June 30, 2011, Pacific Wings notified the USDOT of their intent to end service at OWB, saying that they were "unable to procure counter or gate space at Nashville International Airport on reasonable terms," and on October 20, 2011 American Airlines code-share partner Cape Air was selected to operate flights to their hub at Lambert–St. Louis International Airport with service beginning on December 5, 2011.

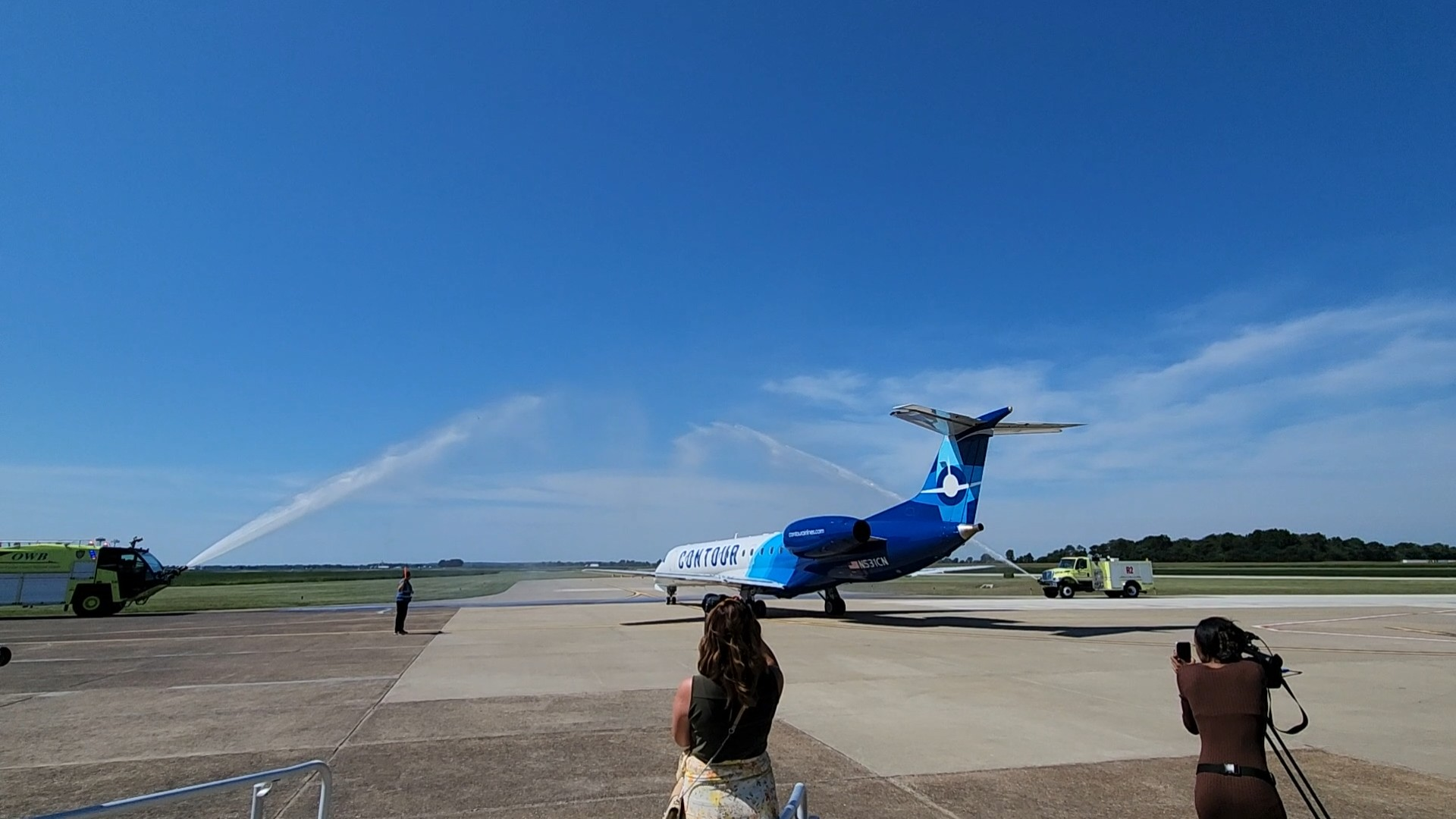
Contour Airlines' inaugural flight from Owensboro to Chicago O'Hare on August 1st, 2023

On February 19, 2009 Allegiant Air began flying Owensboro to Orlando Sanford International Airport; it flew to Las Vegas as well. The airline ended flights to Las Vegas on August 13, 2012, but resumed them later. After 14 years, they discontinued the operations on May 29, 2023.

Due to inflation, Cape Air opted in late 2022 to cease operations out of Owensboro before the end of their contract, which was scheduled to end in 2023. Contour Airlines was chosen to replace Cape Air and commence operations to and from Charlotte. However, both Contour Airlines and Owensboro Airport later decided to change the twelve Owensboro flights per week to go to Chicago O'Hare International Airport instead of Charlotte, as Charlotte was already served by the nearby Evansville Regional Airport, but service to Chicago has been suspended from Evansville Regional Airport since 2021. Department of Transportation approved this change on May 30, 2023. The service started on August 1, 2023. Regular services to and from Charlotte were later added beginning in February 2026.

In June 2026, it was announced that United Express, via SkyWest Airlines, will replace Contour as the airport's EAS provider beginning in Fall of 2026. They will offer service to and from Chicago O'Hare, as well as Washington–Dulles International Airport.

=== Statistics ===
Carrier shares (August 2024 – July 2025)
Carrier	Passengers (arriving and departing)
Contour Airlines	17,910(100.00%)

Top domestic destinations (August 2024 – July 2025)
Rank	Airport	Passengers	Airline
1	Chicago O'Hare (ORD)	9,050	Contour

== See also ==
- List of airports in Kentucky

== Other sources ==
- Essential Air Service documents (Docket OST-2000-7855) from the U.S. Department of Transportation:
  - Order 2005-6-14 (June 15, 2005): reselecting RegionsAir, Inc. d/b/a American Connection, formerly known as Corporate Airlines, to provide subsidized essential air service (EAS) at each of the above communities (Burlington, IA; Cape Girardeau, MO; Ft. Leonard Wood, MO; Jackson, TN; Marion/Herrin, IL; Owensboro, KY; Kirksville, MO) for a new two-year period from June 1, 2005, through May 31, 2007, for a combined annual subsidy of $7,306,249. Also by this order, the department is terminating the show-cause proceeding tentatively terminating subsidy at Kirksville, Missouri, as RegionsAir's selected proposal is below the $200-per-passenger cap.
  - Order 2007-3-5 (March 9, 2007): selecting Big Sky Transportation Co., d/b/a Big Sky Airlines, and Great Lakes Aviation, Ltd. to provide subsidized essential air service (EAS) at the above communities (Burlington, IA; Cape Girardeau, MO; Fort Leonard Wood, MO; Jackson, TN; Marion/Herrin, IL, Owensboro, KY) for the two-year period from June 1, 2007, through May 31, 2009, using 19-seat Beech 1900D turboprop aircraft as follows: Big Sky at Cape Girardeau, Jackson, and Owensboro for a combined annual subsidy of $3,247,440; and Great Lakes at Burlington, Fort Leonard Wood, and Marion/Herrin for a combined annual subsidy of $2,590,461.
  - Order 2008-2-1 (February 1, 2008): selecting Great Lakes Aviation, Ltd. to provide subsidized essential air service at Cape Girardeau, Missouri and Jackson, Tennessee and Owensboro, Kentucky for the two-year period beginning when the carrier starts full EAS at all three communities.
  - Order 2009-6-17 (June 22, 2009): selecting Pacific Wings, LLC to provide essential air service (EAS) at Owensboro, Kentucky, and Jackson, Tennessee, at a combined annual subsidy rate of $2,294,401 ($1,068,773 for Owensboro and $1,225,628 for Jackson), for a two-year period beginning when Pacific Wings inaugurates service.
  - Order 2011-10-14 (October 20, 2011): tentatively selecting Hyannis Air Service, Inc. d/b/a Cape Air to provide subsidized essential air service (EAS) at Owensboro, Kentucky, for a four-year period. The four-year period will begin when Cape Air inaugurates full EAS and will run through the end of the 48th month thereafter. This tentative selection of Cape Air will provide Owensboro with 18 nonstop round trips per week to Lambert–St. Louis International Airport using 9-passenger Cessna 402 aircraft at an annual subsidy rate of $1,529,913.
  - Order 2011-11-5 (November 3, 2011): making final the tentative findings in Order 2011-10-14.
