= KDTS =

KDTS may refer to:

- Destin Executive Airport (ICAO code KDTS)
- KDTS-LD, a low-power television station (channel 14, virtual 52) licensed to serve San Francisco, California, United States
