= Kirksville Regional Airport =

Domestic airport serving Kirksville, Missouri, United States

- IATA: IRK; ICAO: KIRK; FAA LID: IRK

Summary
- Airport type: Public
- Owner: City of Kirksville
- Serves: Kirksville, Missouri, US
- Location: Pettis Township, near Millard
- Elevation AMSL: 966 ft (294 m)
- Coordinates: 40°05′36″N 092°32′42″W
- Website: www.kirksvillecity.com/p/airport

Map
- Location within Missouri Location within the United States

Runways
Direction	Length		Surface
Direction	ft	m	Surface
18/36	6,005	1,830	Concrete
9/27	1,370	418	Turf

Statistics (2023)
- Aircraft operations (year ending 4/30/2023): 5,888
- Based aircraft: 20
- Source: Federal Aviation Administration

Kirksville Regional Airport (IATA: IRK, ICAO: KIRK, FAA LID: IRK) is a city-owned public-use airport located four miles south of Kirksville, Missouri, on the west side of U.S. Highway 63. It serves both commercial flights and general aviation. One airline provides scheduled passenger flights, subsidized by the Essential Air Service program.

Contour Airlines serves Kirksville with 7 weekly flights to Chicago O'Hare International Airport and 5 weekly flights to Dallas-Forth Worth International Airport, using CRJ100/200 and Embraer 135/145 regional jets. Contour has interline agreements with American Airlines, United Airlines, JetBlue, and Alaska Airlines, which facilitate passenger bookings and connections on itineraries that include flights operated by those carriers.

On June 12, 2026, the U.S. Department of Transportation approved the renewal of Contour's contract to provide EAS service at Kirksville through July 31, 2029.

The Federal Aviation Administration's National Plan of Integrated Airport Systems for 2025-2029 categorized the airport as a regional facility with non-primary commercial service (between 2,500 and 10,000 enplanements per year).

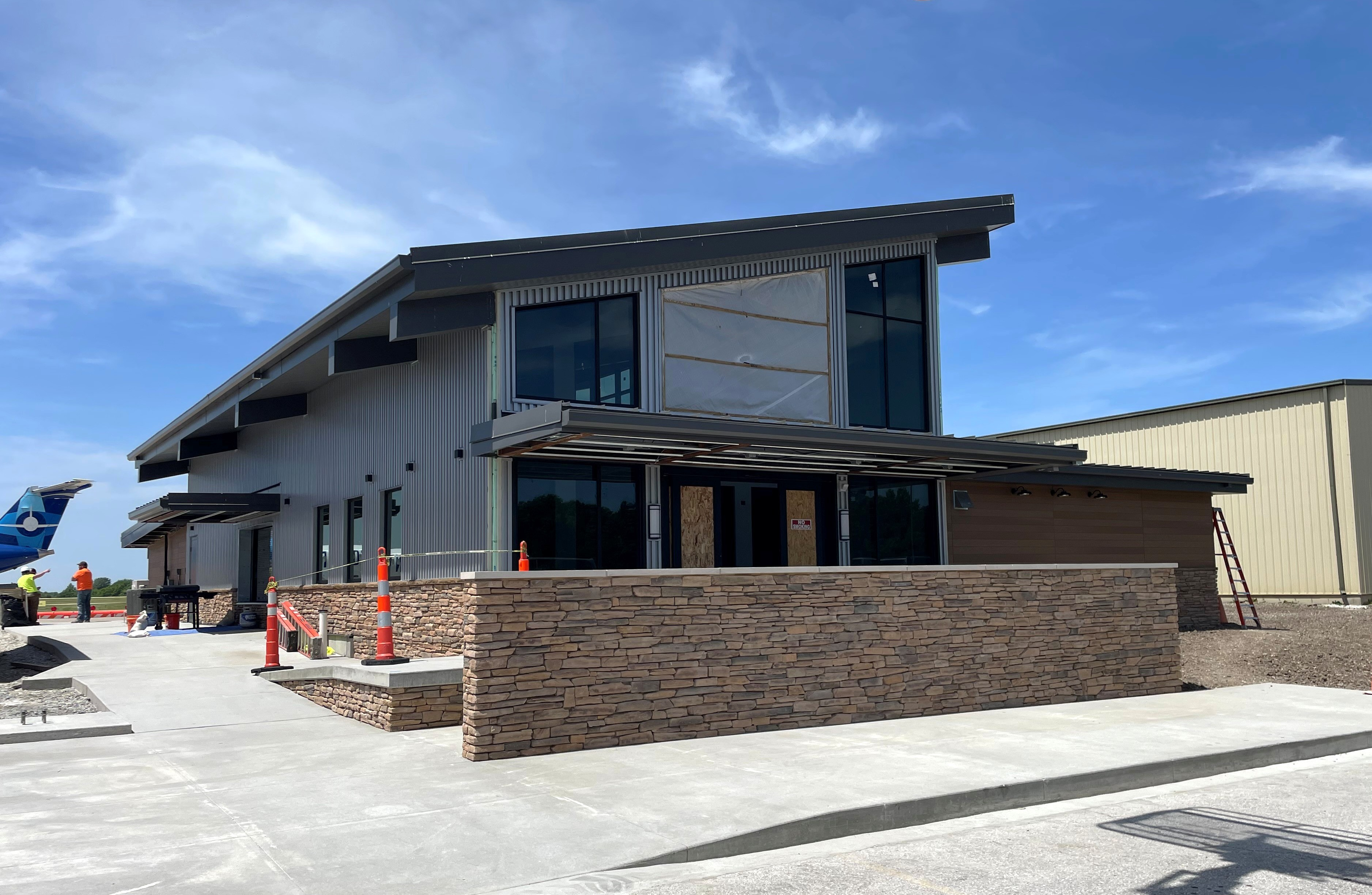
New Kirksville Terminal Nearing Completion in May 2026

== History ==
In 1924, Roy B. "Cap" Dodson started the first airport in the area, located on the north edge of Kirksville. However, an airfield at the present location of Kirksville Regional Airport wasn't created until 1930 when the federal government built "Intermediate Field, Site 12" on the Kansas City-Chicago airway as one of a series of emergency landing strips across the nation.

With America's entry into World War II, the Kirksville Municipal Airport (as it had been declared in the late 1930s) received a major upgrade from the Civilian Pilot Training Program, later renamed the War Training Service. In 1942 a paved all-weather landing strip, hangars, a tower, and a small restaurant were built. Between January 1941 and January 1944, between 1,800 and 2,000 men were trained in the program at Kirksville.

On October 1, 1960, Ozark Air Lines began scheduled flights to Kirksville. The initial Ozark route flew between Kansas City and Chicago with stops in Kirksville, Ottumwa and Cedar Rapids, Iowa, and Moline, Ill. Later in the 1960s, Ozark switched Kirksville service from a Kansas City-Chicago route to a Des Moines-to-St. Louis one.

Airport improvements came after a bond issue was approved by Kirksville voters in November 1967. A new six-thousand-foot concrete runway was built, as well as a new terminal building and improved hangar facilities. With the airport improvements came a new name, Clarence Cannon Memorial Airport—chosen to honor long-time U.S. Congressman Clarence Cannon of Missouri who had done much to help secure air service and funding for the airport. That name was retained until the Kirksville Regional name was adopted in 1984, and the terminal building was named after Rep. Cannon.

Ozark flew its final route to Kirksville on April 23, 1976. Fortunately a local pilot and dentist, Dr. Stephen Barber, had established a small commuter air service, Horizon Airways, in 1972. Horizon was able to help fill the void left by Ozark's departure, eventually expanding by 1976 to offer service to both Kansas City and St. Louis, and changing its name to Air Missouri. Air Illinois also provided service to St. Louis in the mid-1970s.

From 1978 to 1987, Kirksville was served by Green Hills Aviation with commuter flights to St. Louis. From 1987 through December 1989, Midcontinent Airlines flew to Kansas City as Braniff Express on behalf of Braniff (1983-1990). Kirksville then went without commercial service during 1990 until Redwing Airways began commuter flights to Kansas City, which continued until October 2001.

From 2001 through 2006 Corporate Airlines, which later became RegionsAir, provided flights to St. Louis. The carrier first operated as Trans World Express on behalf of TWA, then as American Connection on behalf of American Airlines.

Air Midwest (operating as US Airways Express), a subsidiary of Mesa Air Group, provided flights to Kansas City from November 2006 through May 2008. Kirksville went without service until July 2008, when Air Choice One began scheduled flight operations twice daily, to and from St. Louis.

In September 2010, Cape Air replaced Air Choice One with service to St. Louis that continued until 2023, providing three daily round trips. In 2023 Cape Air was replaced by Contour, which initially provided 12 flights per week to Chicago using regional jet aircraft. This was the first scheduled jet service to Kirksville.

== Facilities ==
The airport covers 476 acres (193 ha) at an elevation of 966 feet (294 m). It has two runways: 18/36 is 6,005 by 100 feet (1,830 x 30 m) concrete; 9/27 is 1,370 by 100 feet (418 x 30 m) turf. An instrument landing system (ILS) was installed for Runway 36 in 2007.

On June 25, 2026, Kirksville passengers began using the airport's new 6,500 square foot terminal building, which provides nearly twice as much passenger service area as the previous building.

In the year ending April 30, 2023, the airport had 5,888 aircraft operations, average 113 per week: 50% general aviation, 37% airline, 12% air taxi, and <1% military. 20 aircraft were then based at the airport: 17 single-engine, 2 multi-engine, and 1 jet.

== Airline and destination ==
Contour Airlines connects Kirksville Airport to Dallas/Fort Worth International Airport and O'Hare International Airport (Chicago).

== Statistics ==
Total Passengers (Arriving and Departing) - 11,480 (2024).

Passenger boardings (enplanements) by year, per FAA and BTS data
Year	2016	2017	2018	2019	2020	2021	2022	2023	2024	2025
Enplanements	4,733	5,152	5,306	5,244	2,905	4,099	4,667	4,281	5,611	5,375
Change	▼8.4%	▲8.9%	▲3.0%	▼1.2%	▼44.6%	▲41.1%	▲13.9%	▼8.3%	▲31.1%	▼4.2%
Airline	Cape Air	Cape Air	Cape Air	Cape Air	Cape Air	Cape Air	Cape Air	Cape Air Contour	Contour	Contour
Destination(s)	St. Louis	St. Louis	St. Louis	St. Louis	St. Louis	St. Louis	St. Louis	St. Louis Chicago	Chicago	Chicago

== Incidents ==
- On February 24, 1967, two people were killed when a Mooney M20B Mark 21 crashed about 7 miles west of the airport. The National Transportation Safety Board concluded that the plane went into a spin for undetermined reasons shortly after taking off, and the pilot was unable to recover control.
- On August 3, 1981, four people were killed when a Piper PA-28 Warrior crashed shortly after midnight about a quarter mile south of the airport. The plane had taken off in dense fog after the airport had closed for the evening. The NTSB concluded that the pilot experienced spatial disorientation after initiating the flight in adverse weather conditions.
- On October 19, 2004, Corporate Airlines Flight 5966, a BAe Jetstream 32 turboprop, crashed on approach to Kirksville. Thirteen individuals died and two sustained injuries. The NTSB determined pilot error to be the cause of the accident.
- On May 12, 2005, a Midwest Airlines Boeing 717 en route from Kansas City to Washington, D.C., safely made an emergency landing at Kirksville after icing caused unreliable airspeed indications and a subsequent pilot-induced loss of control. To date it is the largest aircraft to have landed at Kirksville.
- On November 5, 2013, two people were killed when a Piper PA-32R-301 Saratoga crashed on approach to Kirksville. The plane went down about 3 miles northeast of the runway, shortly after a radio message in which the pilot reported no difficulties. The NTSB determined that the pilot lost control due to spatial disorientation.

The emergency landing strip at the Kirksville airport's future site also played an indirect role in a 1935 crash that impacted U.S. aviation history. On May 6, 1935, TWA Flight 6, a Douglas DC-2, crashed near Barnesville, Mo., while trying to reach the emergency strip. The crash killed five of the 13 people on board, including U.S. Sen. Bronson M. Cutting of New Mexico. His death led Congress to examine the management of U.S. civil aviation under the Bureau of Air Commerce – a political battle that led to the establishment in 1938 of the Civil Aeronautics Authority, a predecessor of the FAA.

== See also ==
- List of airports in Missouri

== Other sources ==
- Essential Air Service documents (Docket DOT-OST-1997-2515) from the U.S. Department of Transportation:
  - Order 2000-10-33: selecting Corporate Airlines, Inc., to provide subsidized essential air service (EAS) at Kirksville for a two-year period beginning after November 1, 2000.
  - Order 2005-6-14: re-selecting RegionsAir, Inc. d/b/a American Connection, formerly known as Corporate Airlines, to provide subsidized essential air service (EAS) at Kirksville and other communities for a new two-year period from June 1, 2005, through May 31, 2007.
  - Order 2006-8-19: selecting Air Midwest, Inc., a wholly owned subsidiary of Mesa Air Group, Inc., d/b/a US Airways Express, to provide essential air service (EAS) at Kirksville at an annual subsidy rate of $627,100. This rate and carrier selection will become effective for the two-year period beginning when Air Midwest replaces RegionsAir, Inc., at Kirksville.
  - Order 2008-5-2: selecting Multi-Aero, Inc. d/b/a Air Choice One to provide essential air service at Kirksville with 11 nonstop stop round trips each week to St. Louis on 6- or 9-seat twin engine aircraft. Annual subsidy rate $806,169.
  - Order 2010-6-6: selecting Hyannis Air Service, Inc. d/b/a Cape Air to provide essential air service at Kirksville with 21 nonstop round trips to St. Louis each week on 8- or 9-seat twin engine aircraft. Initial annual subsidy rate $1,422,110.
  - Order 2023-4-8: selecting Corporate Flight Management, Inc. d/b/a Contour Airlines to provide essential air service at Kirksville with 12 nonstop round trips to Chicago each week on 30-seat regional jet aircraft. Initial annual subsidy rate $5,609,670.
  - Order 2026-6-10: renewing Corporate Flight Management, Inc. d/b/a Contour Airlines to provide essential air service at Kirksville with 12 nonstop round trips to Chicago and Dallas/Ft. Worth each week on 30-seat regional jet aircraft. Initial annual subsidy rate $5,971,060.
