= KMKL =

KMKL may refer to:

- KMKL (FM), a radio station (90.3 FM) licensed to North Branch, Minnesota, United States
- the ICAO code for McKellar-Sipes Regional Airport, in Jackson, Tennessee, United States
