= Circasemidian rhythm =

In chronobiology, a circasemidian rhythm is a physiological arousal cycle that peaks twice in a 24-hour day. It may also be called the semicircadian rhythm. Numerous studies have demonstrated that human circadian rhythms in many measures of performance and physiological activity have a 2-peak daily (circasemidian) pattern. The word, circasemidian, is based upon the Latin words circa ("about"), semi ("half") and dia ("day"). Thus, this is a rhythm that has two cycles per day, and some investigators have referred to it as the semicircadian rhythm. It usually serves to (1) deepen the pre-dawn nadir in body temperature and cognitive performance, (2) create a flat spot during the early afternoon in the daytime increase in body temperature and cognitive performance (the "post-lunch dip"), and (3) heighten the early-evening peak in body temperature and cognitive performance. Broughton was the first to bring this characteristic of human performance to the attention of researchers.

== Evidence ==
No evidence exists to support the presence of a circasemidian rhythm in the rhythmic cells of the suprachiasmatic nucleus, the accepted internal timing source for the major circadian rhythms of the body. Thus, though it falls in the domain of an ultradian rhythm, the circasemidian rhythm may be the first harmonic of the circadian rhythm and not an intrinsic rhythm. However, a number of published data sets have shown a daily two-peak error pattern in industrial and transportation environments. The pattern was also obvious in many of the charts shown in the review by Rutenfranz and Colquhoun, though they did not suggest a circasemidian rhythm as a mediator for the pattern. Other investigators have reported a circasemidian rhythm in body temperature, melatonin and slow-wave sleep.

== Recommendation ==
These behavioral and physiological observations support the need to consider a 12-hour rhythmicity in the quantification of daily variations in physiological function and some kinds of cognitive performance in fatigue modeling efforts such as the Fatigue Avoidance Scheduling Tool.
