= Air Choice One =

American commuter airline based in Missouri

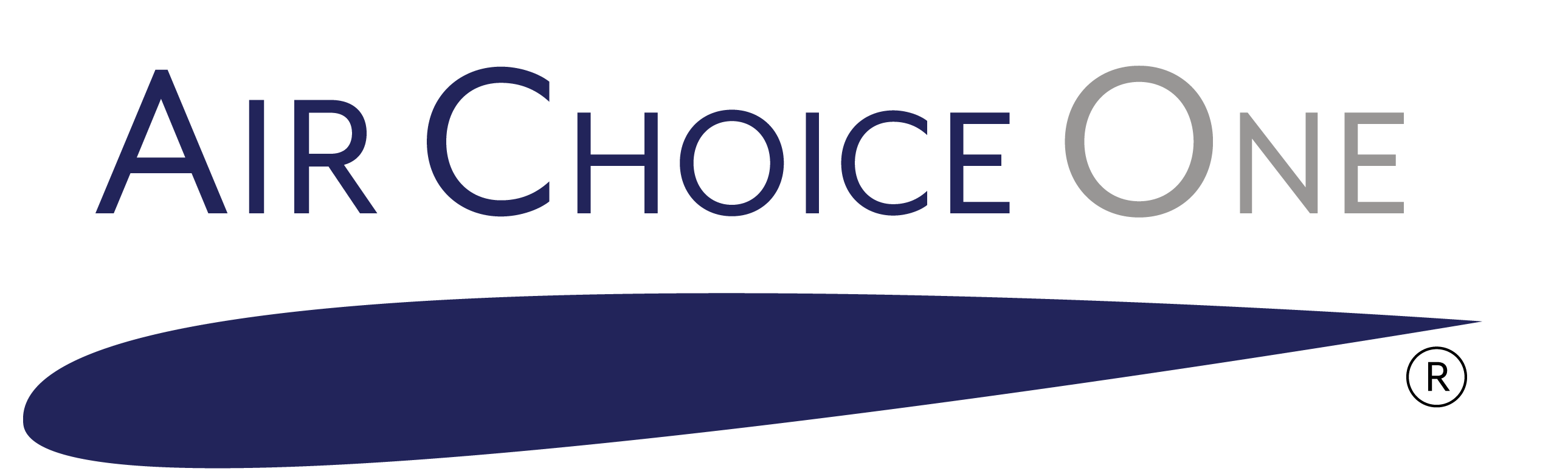
IATA	ICAO	Call sign
3E	ACO	WEBER
- Founded: 1979; 46 years ago (as Multi-Aero Corporation)
- Commenced operations: 2010; 15 years ago
- Ceased operations: 2022; 3 years ago
- AOC #: MUIA594G
- Hubs: St. Louis; Nashville
- Frequent-flyer program: Choice Plus
- Fleet size: 3
- Destinations: 3
- Parent company: Southern Airways Corporation; Multi-Aero, Inc.
- Headquarters: St. Louis, Missouri United States
- Key people: Shane Storz (President)
- Employees: 25 (13 pilots)
- Website: airchoiceone.com

Multi-Aero, Inc., doing business as Air Choice One, a division of Southern Airways Corporation, was an American commuter airline with its headquarters in Concord, Missouri, within the Greater St. Louis area. It operated as a regional airline offering commuter flights from St. Louis Lambert International Airport to smaller regional airports, subsidized under the Essential Air Service program. Air Choice One's callsign, "Weber," is in honor of Mike Weber, the airline's first Chief Pilot.

== History ==
Multi-Aero was founded in 1979 under the name Multi-Aero Corporation. In October 2009, Air Choice One won the EAS contract to serve Decatur, Illinois, and Burlington, Iowa.

Air Choice One was awarded its first EAS contract to replace SeaPort Airlines in Jonesboro, Arkansas in December 2011. In January 2013, the DOT granted Air Choice One a three-year contract extension for both Decatur, Illinois, and Burlington, Iowa. As a stipulation for obtaining both extensions, Air Choice One implemented systems for electronic ticketing and baggage agreements via WorldSpan (a part of the global distribution system, or GDS) in December 2012. This allows passengers to book tickets with connections to and from other major airlines on popular travel websites in a "one-click" process, as opposed to buying tickets at one airline and then having to book tickets with another on two separate confirmations.

On December 21, 2017, Air Choice One was granted a four-year contract extension in Burlington, Iowa, and was not selected for another term in Decatur, marking the end of Air Choice One's nearly eight years of service to Decatur Airport.

On March 14, 2018, the airline passed the FAA mandated proving runs with its Beechcraft 1900C, meaning that the aircraft is now approved to be used in daily line operations. Air Choice One began operating the aircraft between Fort Dodge, Iowa and both Minneapolis and St. Louis in May 2018 and continues to bid on other essential air service routes proposing to use the Beechcraft 1900.

Effective February 1, 2019, the 3-letter ICAO prefix changed from WBR to ACO. In March 2019, the airline started utilizing InteliSys' ameliaRES reservation system. This system provides Passenger Service System (PSS) and departure control systems (DCS), reservation management, codeshare, interline and real-time inventory control.

Air Choice One began a new frequent flyer program in early 2020 named Choice Plus. Customers can earn points from flying and redeem them on future flights. The airline does not participate in any significant global airline alliances, nor does it have any codeshare agreements. Also, in early 2020, the airline added the ability for web check-in and mobile compatibility for passengers.

Air Choice One has flown cargo seasonally during peak season for United Parcel Service from Wichita Dwight D. Eisenhower National Airport, Raleigh–Durham International Airport and Manchester-Boston Regional Airport.

In March 2021, Air Choice One fully integrated TSA PreCheck into their customer booking experience, allowing passengers to use a Known Traveler Number (KTN) for expedited and simplified security screening.

In August 2021, the Burlington airport board voted to recommend Cape Air to take over the EAS contract for Burlington, IA. In September 2021 the Jonesboro airport board voted to recommend to keep Air Choice One in JBR with the possibility of two destinations, St. Louis as well as adding Nashville service. In December 2021 the DOT granted a four-year contract extension and approved the new Nashville service which started March 1, 2022.

On March 28, 2022, it was announced that Air Choice One would be bought by the Southern Airways Corporation, the parent company of Southern Airways Express. It was initially planned that the two air operator certificates would be kept separate.

On July 2, 2022, Southern Airways Corporation closed the Air Choice One website and decided to discontinue the Air Choice One service, bringing the company's aircraft and operations to the SAC operator certificate. All remaining flights were transferred to the Southern Airways Express brand.

== Destinations ==
City	Airport	IATA code	Destinations	Notes
Arkansas
Jonesboro	Jonesboro Municipal Airport	JBR	St. Louis Nashville	EAS Community | Community will be branded as Southern by mid-summer 2022
Missouri
St. Louis	St. Louis Lambert International Airport	STL	Jonesboro	Hub
Tennessee
Nashville	Nashville International Airport	BNA	Jonesboro	

== Former Destinations ==
City	Airport	IATA code	Destinations	Notes
Florida
Destin	Destin Executive Airport	DTS	Jackson	Seasonal
(Georgia (U.S. state)) Georgia
Atlanta	Hartsfield-Jackson Atlanta International Airport	ATL	Jackson	
Illinois
Chicago	O'Hare International Airport	ORD	Burlington	
Decatur	Decatur Airport	DEC	Chicago O'Hare St. Louis	EAS Community | Contract awarded to Cape Air
Iowa
Burlington	Southeast Iowa Regional Airport	BRL	Chicago O'Hare St. Louis	EAS Community | Cape Air awarded contract
Fort Dodge	Fort Dodge Regional Airport	FOD	Mason City Minneapolis St. Louis	EAS Community | SkyWest Airlines awarded contract
Mason City	Mason City Municipal Airport	MCW	Burlington Minneapolis Chicago O'Hare	EAS Community | SkyWest Airlines awarded contract
Michigan
Ironwood	Gogebic-Iron County Airport	IWD	Chicago O'Hare Minneapolis	EAS Community | Boutique Air awarded contract
Minnesota
Minneapolis	Minneapolis-St. Paul International Airport	MSP	Fort Dodge Ironwood Mason City	
Missouri
Kirksville	Kirksville Airport	STL	St. Louis	EAS Community | Cape Air awarded contract
Tennessee
Jackson	McKellar-Sipes Regional Airport	MKL	Atlanta Destin St. Louis	EAS Community | Boutique Air awarded contract

== Fleet ==
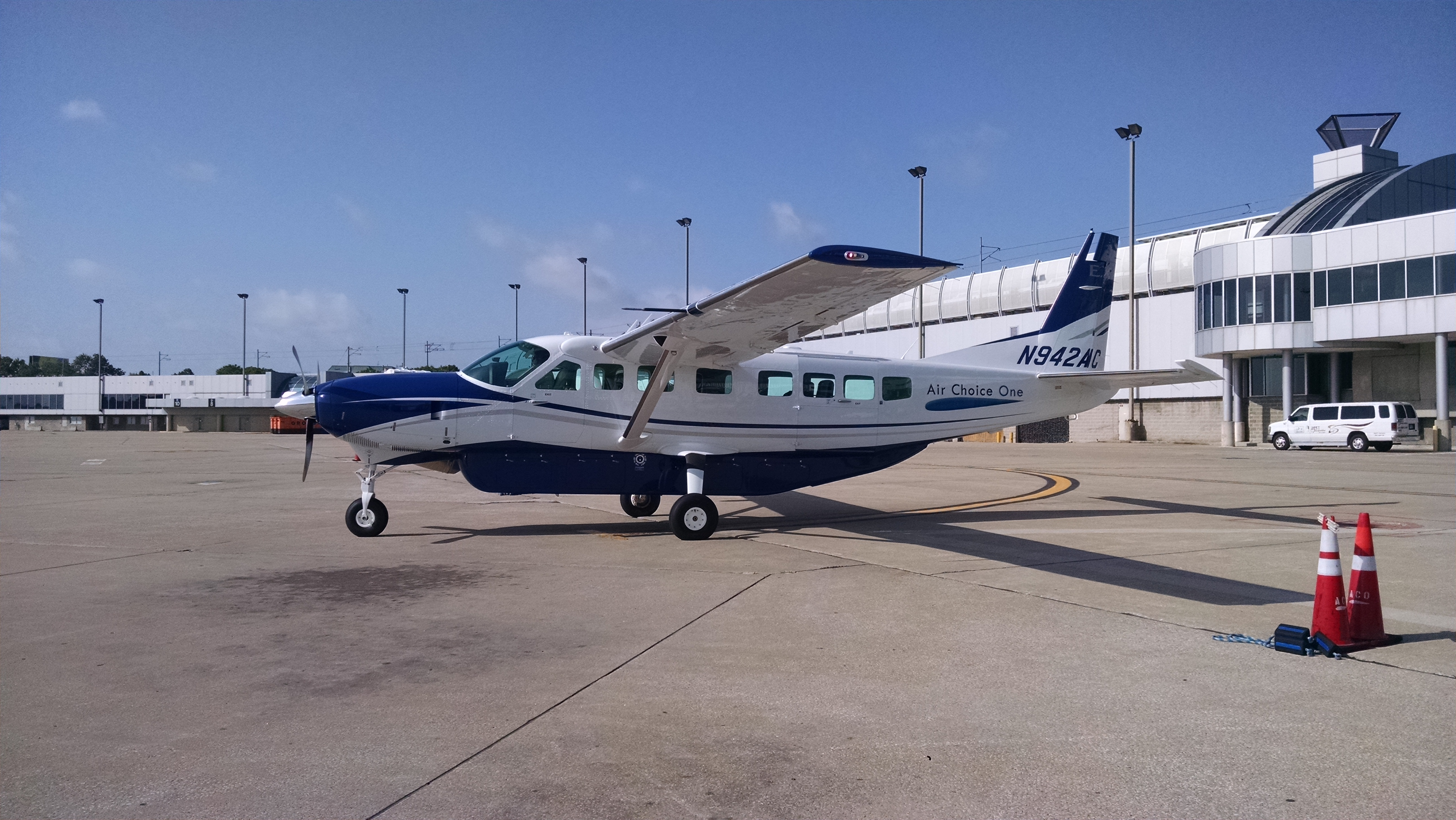
Air Choice One Cessna 208B Grand Caravan EX

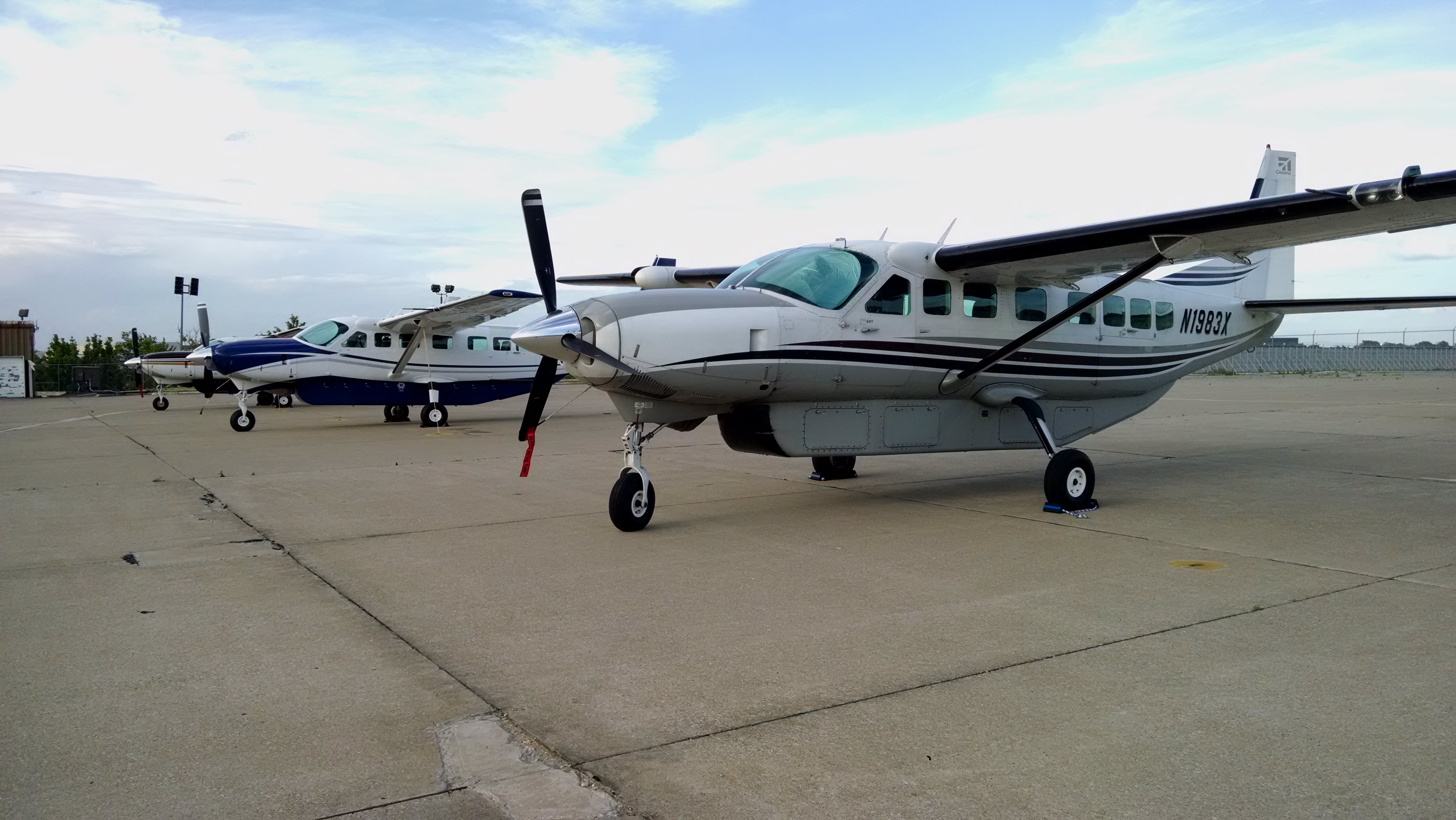
Three Air Choice One aircraft on their hangar's ramp at STL

Prior to closure, Air Choice One operated the following aircraft:

Air Choice One fleet
Aircraft	In fleet	Orders	Passengers	Notes
Beechcraft 1900C	1	0	9	Currently configured for 9 with intent for 19 upon FAA approval expected Q2 2022
Cessna 208B Grand Caravan	2	0	8	Two aircraft have the ability to be converted to all-cargo configuration.
Total	3	0		

At the peak of Air Choice One's operation they operated 12 Cessna 208B (N732MD, N1983X, N1258B, N4118K, N208EE, N750Z, N803F, N107KA, N942AC, N943AC, N91AC, N958AC) and 1 Beechcraft 1900C (N165LC) aircraft.

== Choice Plus ==
Air Choice One had a frequent flyer program called Choice Plus. Customers that sign up for the program could earn points on every Air Choice One flight when they enter their rewards number. Depending on the fare chosen, a different percentage of points would be applied.

- Business Fare - 100%
- Everyday - 60%

For every dollar spent, one point is earned. These points would expire after two years.
