= Gogebic–Iron County Airport =

Airport in Michigan, United States

- IATA: IWD; ICAO: KIWD; FAA LID: IWD

Summary
- Airport type: Public
- Owner: Gogebic County
- Serves: Ironwood, Michigan / Hurley, Wisconsin
- Opened: April 1940
- Elevation AMSL: 1,230 ft (370 m)
- Coordinates: 46°31′39″N 090°07′53″W
- Website: flyfromironwood.com

Map
- Location of airport in Michigan IWD (the United States)

Runways
Direction	Length		Surface
Direction	ft	m	Surface
9/27	6,502	1,982	Asphalt

Statistics (12 months ending August 2026 ^{except where noted})
- Passenger volume: 15,194
- Departing passengers: 7,760
- Scheduled flights: 613
- Cargo (lb.): 0
- Aircraft operations (2023): 5,766
- Based aircraft (2023): 18
- Sources: FAA, Michigan DOT

Gogebic–Iron County Airport (IATA: IWD, ICAO: KIWD, FAA LID: IWD) is a county-owned public-use airport located seven nautical miles (13 km) northeast of the central business district of Ironwood, a city in Gogebic County, Michigan, United States. It is mostly used for general aviation, but it also offers scheduled passenger service which is subsidized by the Essential Air Service program.

The airport is included in the Federal Aviation Administration (FAA) National Plan of Integrated Airport Systems for 2021–2025, in which it is categorized as a non-primary commercial service facility.

The airport received $30,000 from the US Department of Transportation in 2020 as part of the CARES Act to help it mitigate the effects of the COVID-19 pandemic.

== Facilities and aircraft ==
Gogebic–Iron County Airport covers an area of 1,180 acres (478 ha) at an elevation of 1,230.3 feet (375 m) above mean sea level. It has one runway designated 9/27 with an asphalt surface measuring 6,502 by 100 feet (1,982 by 30 m), with approved ILS, GPS and VOR/DME approaches. In addition, the Ironwood VORTAC (IWD) navigational facility is located at the field.

The airport closed for six weeks in 2020 to perform major construction to the airport's single runway. The existing surface was pulverized with underlying base course and a new asphalt surface paved. Lighting and wiring were replaced, and the runway was repainted.

For the 12-month period ending June 29, 2023, the airport had 5,766 aircraft operations, an average of 16 per day: 62% general aviation, 30% scheduled commercial, 9% air taxi and less than 1% military. In November 2023, there were 18 aircraft based at this airport: 15 single-engine and 3 multi-engine.

The airport operates its own FBO, which offers fuel, a lounge, a conference room, and courtesy cars.

In June 2023 state-of-the-art Advanced Imaging Technology (AIT) was added to the Transportation Security Administration checkpoint at the airport.

== Airline and destinations ==
=== Passenger ===
The airport is served by the following airline:

Airlines	Destinations
Denver Air Connection	Chicago–O'Hare, Minneapolis/St. Paul

=== Historical airline service ===
Frontier Express provided service to Rhinelander (RHI), continuing on to Milwaukee (MKE) until March 8, 2012. Great Lakes Airlines began Minneapolis/St. Paul (MSP) service on March 17, 2012, but this was discontinued on January 31, 2014. On April 18, 2014, the DOT awarded a two-year contract to Air Choice One for service to and from Ironwood to Chicago, Illinois (ORD). Air Choice One began flights to Ironwood on July 7, 2014, and added Minneapolis service in 2016.

Boutique Air service began on August 1, 2020, with service to both Chicago and Minneapolis. Multiple incidents, including a tire falling off an aircraft and a cargo door opening in flight, led the airport board to seek a new air carrier. The board chose to recommend and the DOT approved Denver Air Connection to take over the contract. Service to Chicago is provided on the 50 seat Embraer E145, and flights to Minneapolis use the Dornier 328Jet.

== Statistics ==
Carrier shares (September 2025 – August 2026)
Carrier	Passengers (arriving and departing)
Denver Air Connection	15,194(100.00%)

Top destinations (September 2025 – August 2026)
Rank	Airport	Passengers
1	Chicago–O'Hare, IL	5,220
2	Minneapolis/St. Paul, MN	2,540

== Accidents and incidents ==
- On August 14, 2000, a Rockwell Sabreliner 75A crashed into a wooded area northeast of the airport. The flight was en route from Brainerd-Crow Wing County Airport to Flint/Bishop airport. The aircraft reported an emergency during an en route climb due to a dual engine failure caused by a lightning strike. The aircraft was vectored near a level 5 thunderstorm while it attempted to divert to Ironwood. It was later found that, even though they attempted to restart the engines, the pilots never called for the aircraft's checklists, nor did they discuss load shedding any of the electrical components of the aircraft. The pilots lost their navigation at 17,500 feet msl and 12 miles from the airport and eventually crashed. The probable cause was found to be the pilots' continued flight into known adverse weather, their failure to turn on continuous ignition in turbulence, and their failure to follow the proper procedures for an inflight engine restart. The two pilots received fatal injuries, and two additional passengers on board received serious injuries.
- On April 23, 2003, a Maule M-5-210C ground looped and impacted terrain while attempting to land on Runway 27 at IWD. The pilot reported that the tail wheel "shimmied" when he attempted a three-point landing on touchdown, so he pushed forward on the yoke to lift the tail and then subsequently pulled back on the yoke. The pilot noticed he became unaligned with the runway and tried adding full power to go around, but he did not have enough airspeed to lift off before running off the side of the runway. The aircraft impacted a drainage ditch south of the runway. The probable cause of the accident was the pilot's inadvertent ground loop on the runway. The pilot and passenger were uninjured.
- On December 28, 2004, a twin-engine Piper crashed while trying to land at Ironwood. Visibility was reportedly good. The pilot, his wife, and their three daughters were killed.
- On June 2, 2017, a single-engine aircraft practicing landings at the airport narrowly avoided striking a fawn as it ran across the runway. The pilot veered to avoid the deer and damaged a wheel assembly on the plane. There were no injuries.
- On August 3, 2019, a Piper PA-28 Cherokee originating from IWD crashed on route to Ontonagon County Airport due to flight into adverse weather.

== See also ==
- List of airports in Michigan

== Other sources ==
- Essential Air Service documents (Docket Number DOT-OST-1996-1266) from the U.S. Department of Transportation:
  - Order 2005-5-14 (May 23, 2005): selecting Skyway Airlines, Inc., d/b/a Midwest Connect, to provide essential air service at Iron Mountain/Kingsford, Michigan, Ironwood, Michigan/Ashland, Wisconsin, and Manistee/Ludington, Michigan, for a two-year period at annual subsidy rates of $602,761, $409,242, and $776,051, respectively ($1,788,054 in total).
  - Order 2007-3-21 (March 30, 2007): selecting Great Lakes Aviation, Ltd. to provide subsidized essential air service at Iron Mountain/Kingsford, Michigan, Ironwood, Michigan/Ashland, Wisconsin, Manistee/Lundington, Michigan, and Escanaba, Michigan for the two-year period beginning when the carrier inaugurates full service. The annual subsidy rates will be set at: $797,885 for Iron Mountain/Kingsford, $799,779 for Ironwood/Ashland, $957,978 for Manistee/Ludington, and $617,415 for Escanaba.
  - Order 2008-4-10 (April 7, 2008): selecting Great Lakes Aviation, Ltd., to provide subsidized essential air service (EAS) at Ironwood, Michigan/Ashland, Wisconsin, and Manistee/Ludington, Michigan, utilizing 19-seat Beech 1900D aircraft at a combined annual subsidy rate of $3,292,260, for a new two-year term beginning when it inaugurates full service.
  - Order 2011-1-16 (January 18, 2011): selecting Chautauqua Airlines, Inc. d/b/a Frontier Airlines, a wholly owned subsidiary of Republic Airways Holdings, Inc., to provide subsidized essential air service (EAS) at Ironwood, Michigan/Ashland, Wisconsin (Ironwood), and Manistee/Ludington, Michigan (Manistee). Service will be provided with 37-seat Embraer 135 aircraft for a two-year period beginning when the carrier inaugurates service through the end of the 24th month thereafter, at a combined annual subsidy rate of $3,082,383.
  - Order 2012-3-5 (March 7, 2012): selecting Great Lakes Aviation, Ltd. to provide subsidized Essential Air Service (EAS) at Ironwood, Michigan/Ashland, Wisconsin, and Rhinelander, Wisconsin, for a two-year period beginning when the carrier inaugurates full EAS at both communities through the end of the 24th month thereafter. Great Lakes, utilizing 19-seat Beech 1900D aircraft, will require annual subsidies of $1,410,250 for Rhinelander and $1,747,326 for Ironwood/Ashland. Chautauqua will continue to utilize 37-seat or substitute 50-seat jet aircraft for a short-term annual subsidy rate of $1,837,638.
  - Order 2012-9-17 (September 14, 2012): establishing the Essential Air Service (EAS) contract end date at Ironwood, Michigan/Ashland, Wisconsin, as May 31, 2014.
  - Order 2014-4-17 (April 18, 2014): selecting Multi-Aero, Inc. d/b/a Air Choice One, to provide Essential Air Service (EAS) at Ironwood, Michigan/Ashland, Wisconsin, using nine-passenger Cessna Grand Caravan or eight-passenger Piper Navajo aircraft to Chicago O'Hare International Airport for three round trips each weekday and weekend (18 total per week), for the two-year term from June 1, 2014, through May 31, 2016, for an annual subsidy of $3,563,394.
