= Corporate Airlines Flight 5966 =

2004 aviation accident in Missouri

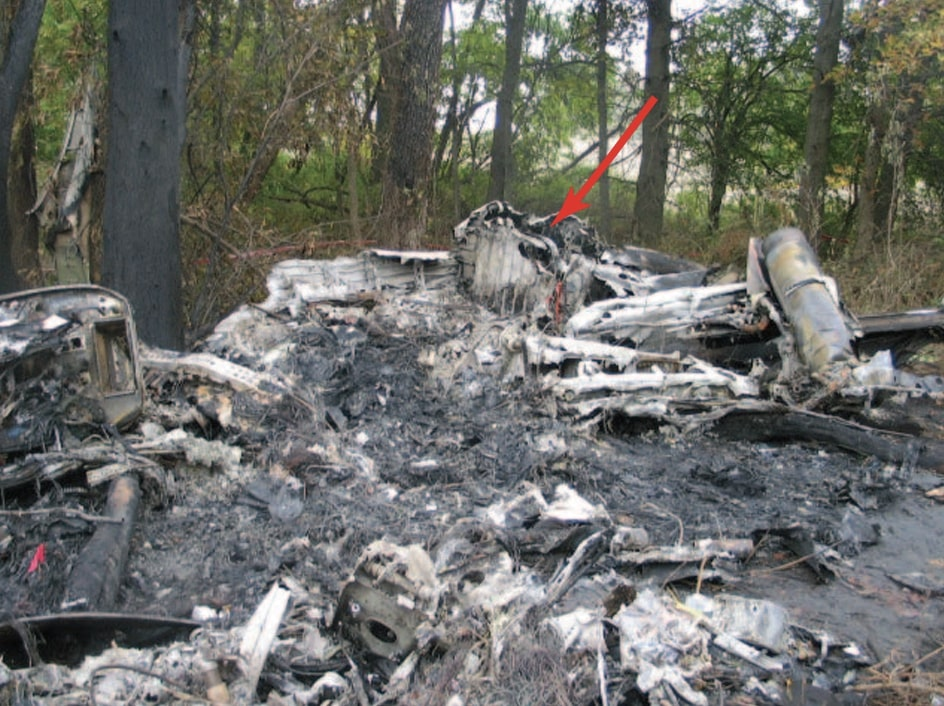
- Wreckage of the aircraft

Accident
- Date: October 19, 2004
- Summary: Controlled flight into terrain due to pilot error and pilot fatigue
- Site: Adair County, Missouri, United States; 40.064618°N 92.543186°W

Aircraft
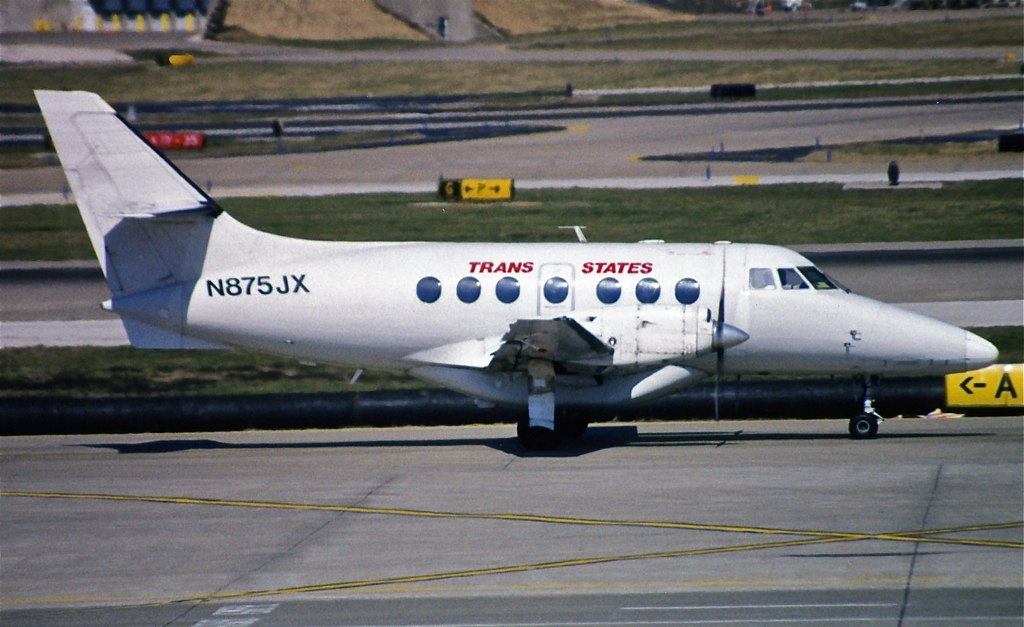
- N875JX, the aircraft involved in the accident, while still in service with Trans States Airlines in 1999
- Aircraft type: British Aerospace Jetstream 32
- Operator: Corporate Airlines on behalf of AmericanConnection
- ICAO flight No.: CEA5966
- Call sign: CORP-X 5966
- Registration: N875JX
- Flight origin: St. Louis Lambert International Airport, Berkeley, Missouri, United States
- Destination: Kirksville Regional Airport, Adair County, Missouri, United States
- Occupants: 15
- Passengers: 13
- Crew: 2
- Fatalities: 13
- Injuries: 2
- Survivors: 2

Corporate Airlines Flight 5966 was a scheduled passenger flight from St. Louis to Kirksville, Missouri, United States. On October 19, 2004, the British Aerospace Jetstream 32 aircraft operating the flight crashed on approach to Kirksville Regional Airport as a result of pilot error, killing 13 of the 15 people aboard.

== Flight information ==
Flight 5966 was a flight route from St. Louis Lambert International Airport in St. Louis, Missouri, United States, to Kirksville Regional Airport in unincorporated Adair County, Missouri, near the city of Kirksville. Corporate Airlines (later RegionsAir, now defunct) flew the route as part of the AmericanConnection network, an affiliate of American Airlines.

The captain was 48-year-old Kim William Sasse, a former flight instructor who had been with Corporate Airlines since 2001. He had logged 4,234 flight hours, including 2,510 hours on the Jetstream 32. The first officer was 29-year-old Jonathan Palmer, also a former flight instructor. Palmer had been hired by Corporate Airlines only three months before the accident and had 2,856 flight hours, only 107 of which were on the Jetstream 32.

== Accident ==
On October 19, 2004, the Jetstream 32 twin-engine turboprop flying the route crashed on the approach to Kirksville Airport. The crash killed both pilots and 11 of the 13 passengers aboard. The two surviving passengers were seriously injured.

Some of the 13 passengers were doctors from other states who had been due to attend a seminar at the A. T. Still University. These included Steven Z. Miller, who was killed in the crash. Dr. Miller was director of pediatric emergency medicine at New York-Presbyterian Hospital, a prominent figure in the "humanism in medicine" movement. The two passengers who survived were John Krogh (68) and his assistant Wendy Bonham (44).

== Investigation ==
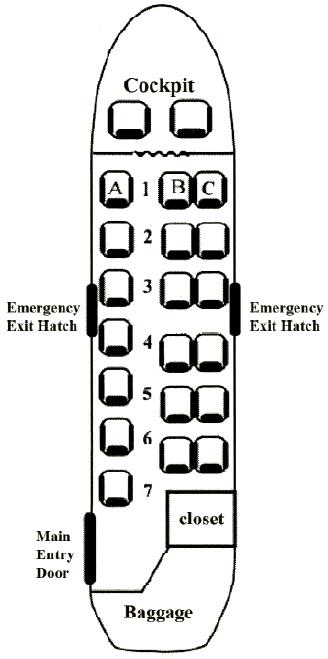
Seating map of Corporate Airlines Flight 5966 produced by the NTSB. The surviving passengers were in seats 4A and 4C, over the wing spar.

The National Transportation Safety Board (NTSB) determined that the probable cause of the accident was:

[T]he pilots' failure to follow established procedures and properly conduct a non-precision instrument approach at night in instrument meteorological conditions, including their descent below the minimum descent altitude before required visual cues were available (which continued un-moderated until the airplane struck the trees) and their failure to adhere to the established division of duties between the flying and non-flying (monitoring) pilot.

The NTSB analysis of the cockpit voice recorder suggested that: both pilots were looking outside the cockpit for visual cues to the location of the airport, when the captain should have been paying attention to his instruments; the first officer did not challenge the captain to leave the visual cues task to him; thus, combining into the captain failing to realize how low he had descended below the minimum descent altitude. The pilots had also worked a 14-hour duty day, including six flights, which was allowed under regulations that had last been updated in 1964, ignoring the four decades of research, performed in the interim, into the debilitating effects of pilot fatigue. The report recognized these two issues, stating that:

Contributing to the accident were the pilots' failure to make standard callouts and the current Federal Aviation Regulations that allow pilots to descend below the minimum descent altitude into a region in which safe obstacle clearance is not assured based upon seeing only the airport approach lights. The pilots' failure to establish and maintain a professional demeanor during the flight and their fatigue likely contributed to their degraded performance.

The report included a recommendation that the FAA should revise its regulations, within two years, taking into account scientific research on pilot fatigue.

== In popular culture ==
The television series Aircrash Confidential featured the incident in the third episode of season 2, titled "'Pilot Fatigue".

The crash of Corporate Airlines Flight 5966 was featured in the 2023 episode "Deadly Exchange", of the Canadian-made, internationally distributed documentary series Mayday.

The crash was also featured in season 2, episode 1 of the HBO documentary-comedy series The Rehearsal, titled "Gotta Have Fun", which is a reference to the pilot's transcripts from this incident. Nathan Fielder recreates this aviation incident using actors reciting the transcripts in a fake cockpit surrounded by a video wall.

== See also ==
- American Airlines Flight 965
- American Airlines Flight 1420
- Korean Air Flight 801
- UPS Airlines Flight 1354
- Sky Lease Cargo Flight 4854
