= Fatigues =

Fatigues may refer to:

== Military ==
- Combat uniform, also called military fatigues, a type of uniform especially in the military
- The plain OG-107 uniform in the United States armed forces
- Workwear worn by soldiers to avoid getting their uniforms dirty in fatigue duty
  - Fatigue duty, labour assigned to military men that does not require the use of armament
- Camouflage pattern on military or fashion clothing

== Other ==
- The Fatigues, a Seinfeld episode

== See also ==
- Fatigue (disambiguation)
