= IMSAFE =

Assessing aircraft pilots' fitness to fly safely

IMSAFE is the Aeronautical Information Manual's recommended mnemonic for aircraft pilots to use to assess their fitness to fly.

== Definition ==
The mnemonic is:

- Illness - Is the pilot suffering from any illness or symptom of an illness which might affect them in flight?
- Medication - Is the pilot currently taking any drugs (prescription or over-the-counter)?
- Stress - Is the pilot overly worried about other factors in their life? The psychological pressures of everyday living on pilot fatigue can be a powerful distraction and consequently affect a pilot's performance.
- Alcohol - Although legal limits vary by jurisdiction (0.04 BAC, any consumption in the past 8 hours or current impairment in the USA), the pilot should consider their alcohol consumption within the last 8 to 24 hours.
- Fatigue - Has the pilot had sufficient sleep and adequate nutrition?
- Emotion - Has the pilot fully recovered from any extremely upsetting events such as the loss of a family member?

'E', while defined under the FAA as standing for Emotion, is considered by other international Aviation Authorities such as the CAA and CASA to stand for Eating, including ensuring proper hydration, sustenance, and correct nutrition.

In some instances one might also find the acronym written as IAMSAFE in which the first 'A' stands for Alimentation (the provision of nourishment).
