= Pilot fatigue =

Reduced pilot performance from inadequate energy

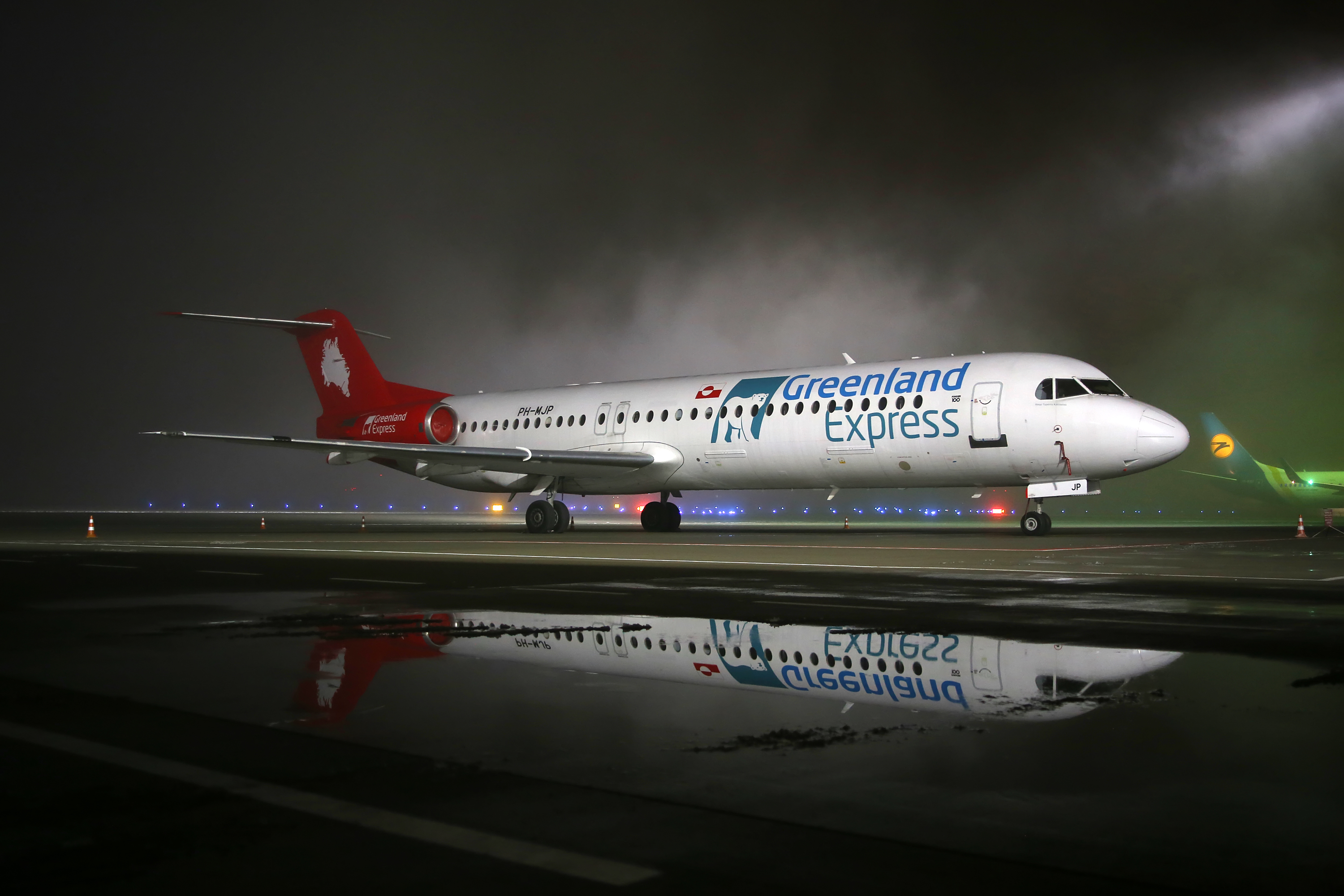
Flight operations often take place at night, which can disrupt the circadian rhythms responsible for monitoring sleep and wake cycles.

The International Civil Aviation Organization (ICAO) defines fatigue as "A physiological state of reduced mental or physical performance capability resulting from sleep loss or extended wakefulness, circadian phase, or workload." The phenomenon places great risk on the crew and passengers of an airplane because it significantly increases the chance of pilot error. Fatigue is particularly prevalent among pilots because of "unpredictable work hours, long duty periods, circadian disruption, and insufficient sleep". These factors can occur together to produce a combination of sleep deprivation, circadian rhythm effects, and 'time-on task' fatigue. Regulators attempt to mitigate fatigue by limiting the number of hours pilots are allowed to fly over varying periods of time.

== Effect on flight safety ==
It has been estimated that 4-7% of civil aviation incidents and accidents can be attributed to fatigued pilots. "In the last 16 years, fatigue has been associated with 250 fatalities in air carrier accidents." Robert Sumwalt, NTSB vice chairman, said at an FAA symposium in July 2016.

Symptoms associated with fatigue include slower reaction times, difficulty concentrating on tasks resulting in procedural mistakes, lapses in attention, inability to anticipate events, higher toleration for risk, forgetfulness, and reduced decision-making ability. The magnitude of these effects are correlated to the circadian rhythm and length of time awake. Performance is affected the most when there is a combination of extended wakefulness and circadian influences.

=== Studies on the effects of fatigue ===
A Federal Aviation Administration (FAA) study of 55 human-factor aviation accidents from 1978 to 1999 concluded that number accidents increased proportionally to the amount of time the captain had been on duty. The accident proportion relative to exposure proportion rose from 0.79 (1–3 hours on duty) to 5.62 (more than 13 hours on duty). According to the study, 5.62% of human-factors accidents occurred to pilots who had been on duty for 13 or more hours, which make up only 1% of total pilot duty hours.

In another study by Wilson, Caldwell and Russell, participants were given three different tasks that simulated the pilot's environment. The tasks included reacting to warning lights, managing simulated cockpit scenarios, and conducting a simulated UAV mission. The subjects' performance was tested in a well-rested state and again after being sleep deprived. In the tasks that were not as complex, such as reacting to warning lights and responding to automated alerts, it was found that there was a significant decrease in performance during the sleep deprived stage. The reaction times to warning lights increased from 1.5 to 2.5 seconds, and the number of errors doubled in the cockpit. However, tasks that were engaging and required more concentration were found to not be significantly affected by sleep deprivation. The study concluded that "...fatigue effects can produce impaired performance. The degree of performance impairment seems to be a function of the numbers of hours awake and the 'engagement' value of the task."

One United States Air Forces study found significant discrepancies regarding how fatigue affects different individuals. It tracked the performance of ten F-117 pilots on a high-fidelity flight simulator. The subjects were sleep deprived for 38 hours and their performance was monitored over the final 24 hours. After baseline correction, the systematic individual differences varied by 50% and concluded that fatigue's effect on performance varied drastically among individuals.

== Prevalence ==
The first step to understanding the critical impact fatigue can have on flight safety is to quantify it within the airline environment. An airline's management often struggles to balance rest with duty periods because it strives for maximum crew productivity. However, fatigue comes as a limitation needing increasing consideration.

A study by Reis et Al. investigated the prevalence of fatigue on a group of Portuguese airline pilots. 1500 active airline pilots who had all flown within the past six months received a questionnaire. Out of the population, 456 reliable responses were received. A pretest was conducted to determine the viability of the fatigue scale adopted during the test, called Fatigue Severity Scale (FSS). The purpose of the validation survey was to set a benchmark (i.e. FSS=4) on an acceptable level of fatigue for the Portuguese culture. The scale ranged from 1 meaning no fatigue to 7 being high. Participants had one month and a half to respond to the inquiry. Results on physical fatigue found that 93% of short/medium haul pilots scored higher than 4 on the FSS while 84% of long-haul pilots scored greater than 4. Mental fatigue found short/medium haul at 96% and long haul at 92%. The Questionnaire also asked: "Do you feel so tired that you shouldn’t be at the controls?". 13% of pilots said that this never happened. 51% of all participants said it happened a few times. Limitations of the study were: fatigue levels are subjective and research did not attempt to control the number of times pilots had available to respond to the questionnaires. Overall the study establishes that pilots are subject to high levels of fatigue on the job. Levels of fatigue collected were also compared with a validation test conducted on multiple sclerosis patients in Switzerland. These patients showed average fatigue levels of 4.6 while pilots in the Portuguese study scored an average of 5.3.

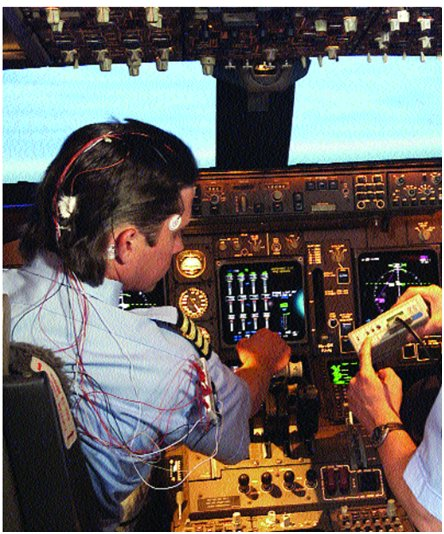
Electroencephalogram probes monitoring physiological activity during a pilot fatigue study

High prevalence of fatigue was also revealed in a study by Jackson and Earl investigating prevalence among short haul pilots. The study consisted of a questionnaire that was posted on a website, Professional Pilot's Rumour network (PPRUNE) and was able to obtain 162 respondents. Of the 162, all being short haul pilots, 75% were classified to have experienced severe fatigue. Based on questionnaire results, the study also demonstrated that pilots who were highly concerned about their level of fatigue during the flight often scored higher on the fatigue scale and thus were likely to experience more fatigue. Not only this, operational factors, for example a change in flights, or from flight into discretionary time often cause the pilot to experience greater fatigue.

On the other hand, research by Samen, Wegmann, and Vejvoda investigated the variation of fatigue among long-haul pilots. 50 pilots all from German airlines participated in the research. As participants, pilots were subject to physiological measures pre-departure and during flight and filled out routine logs recording their times of sleep and awakening. Pilots also completed two questionnaires. The first reflecting feelings of fatigue before and after the flight, recorded before departure, 1-hour intervals during the flight and then immediately after landing. The second questionnaire was the NASA task load index.

The second questionnaire also administered during flight, assessed different dimensions including mental, physical and temporal demand as well as performance. Key findings from the study conveyed that: outgoing flights from the home base were rated as less stressful and night flights were rated as the most stressful. The physiological measures found that microsleeps recorded by the EEGs increased progressively with flight duty. Microsleeps are recordings of alpha wave activity and they occur during wakeful relaxation often resulting in loss of attention. They are considered microsleeps if they last less than thirty seconds. Microsleep cases for pilots on outgoing flights were half compared to the number on incoming flights back to the home base showing that fatigue is more prevalent on flights returning home. Pilots are more prone to microsleeps during the cruise phase of the flight while they are more alert and less likely to experience microsleeps during the take-off, approach and landing phases of the flight. Findings also show that fatigue was greater during night flights because pilots had already been awake for more than 12 hours and would begin duty by the time they were due to go to sleep.

=== Self-assessment ===
Pilots often have to rely on self-assessment in order to decide if they are fit to fly. The IMSAFE checklist is an example of self-assessment. Another measure that a pilot can employ to more accurately determine his level of fatigue is the Samn- Perelli Seven Point Fatigue Scale (SPS). The evaluation has a scale of 1–7, 1 described as “Fully, Alert and Wide Awake” while 7 “Completely exhausted, unable to function effectively”.

All levels in between have descriptions aiding the pilot with his decision. Another example of self-assessment is simply a visual and analogue scale. The test is represented by a line with No Fatigue and Fatigue labeled on two ends. The pilot will then draw a mark where he feels to be. Advantages of self-assessment include that they are quick and easy to administer, can be added to routine checklists and being more descriptive allow pilot to make a better decision. Disadvantages include that it is easy for the pilot to cheat and are often hard to disprove.

Between 2010 and 2012, more than 6.000 European pilots have been asked to self-assess the level of fatigue they are experiencing. These surveys revealed that well over 50% of the surveyed pilots experience fatigue as impairing their ability to perform well while on flight duty. The polls show that e.g. 92% of the pilots in Germany report they have felt too tired or unfit for duty while on flight deck at least once in the past three years. Yet, fearing disciplinary actions or stigmatization by the employer or colleagues, 70-80% of fatigued pilots would not file a fatigue report or declare to be unfit to fly. Only 20-30% will report unfit for duty or file a report under such an occurrence.

== Countermeasures ==
Since the 1930s, airlines have been aware of the impact of fatigue on pilot's cognitive abilities and decision making. Nowadays prevalence of fatigue draws greater attention because of boom in air travel and because the problem can be addressed with new solutions and countermeasures.

=== In-flight strategies ===
- Cockpit napping: A forty-minute nap after a long period of wakefulness can be extremely beneficial. As demonstrated in the Rosekind study, pilots who took a forty-minute nap were much more alert during the last 90 minutes of the flight and they also responded better on the psychomotor vigilance test (PVT) showing faster response rates and fewer lapses. The control group who had not taken a nap showed lapses during the approach and landing phases of the flight. In-seat cockpit napping is a risk-management tool for controlling fatigue. The FAA still has not adopted the cockpit napping strategy, however it is being utilized by Airlines such as British Airways, Air Canada, Emirates, Air New Zealand, Qantas.
- Activity breaks are another measure found to be most beneficial when a pilot is experiencing partial sleep loss or high levels of fatigue. High fatigue coincides with the circadian trough where the human body experiences its lowest body temperature. Studies demonstrated that sleepiness was significantly higher for fatigued pilots who had not taken any walking breaks.
- Bunk sleeping is another effective in-flight strategy. Based on the time zone pilots take-off from, they can determine which times during the flight they will feel inadvertently drowsy. Humans usually feel drowsier mid-morning and then mid-afternoon.
- In-flight rostering or relief involves assigning the crew to specific tasks at specific times during the flight so that other members of the crew have time for activity breaks and bunk sleep. This allows well-rested crew members to be used during the critical phases of flight. Further research will need to show the optimal number of crew members sufficient for a well rested operating crew to operate the flight safely.
- Proper cockpit lighting is paramount in reducing fatigue since it inhibits the production of melatonin. Studies have shown that simply increasing lighting level to 100-200 lux improves alertness in the cockpit. Such levels would affect night vision, however.

=== Alternative strategies ===
- Although pilots are often given layovers with ample time to rest, the environment itself may not be favorable to achieve full recovery. The temperature may be too warm, the place noisy or the time zone change may not facilitate biological sleep. As a result, the use of over-the-counter drugs may be effective. Zolpidem is a well tested pharmaceutical compound with a half-life of two and a half hours and the drug is fully metabolized within 10 hours. It can be used to initiate sleep to help obtain a good rest. It must not be combined with any cockpit-naps. The drug also has no side effects, improving sleep quality without causing insomnia or any detrimental effects on next-day alertness. As pilots know, they must not have any amount of a drug present in their systems at the time they begin duty. However, sleep expert Matthew Walker has questioned the use of such hypnotic sleep drugs as they may not induce real sleep.
- Implementation of a personal checklist to rate fatigue before a flight can aid the decision of whether a pilot feels they are fit to fly. The Samn-Perelli checklist is a good measure with a scale of 1 to 7, with 1 meaning "fully alert" and 7 meaning "completely exhausted and unable to function."
- Implementation of fatigue prediction models, such as the Sleep, Activity, Fatigue, and Task Effectiveness model, optimize scheduling by being able to predict pilot fatigue at any point in time. Although the mathematical model is limited by individual pilot differences it is the most accurate existing prediction because it takes into account time-zone changes, time awake, and length of previous rest.
- Sleep and fatigue monitoring: Using wrist-worn sleep monitors to track sleep accurately. Traditionally, sleep is tracked through personal estimation which is inaccurate. With this technology, regulators could implement operating restrictions or cautions for pilots with less than eight hours of sleep in the previous 24 hours.
- In early 2007, the 201 Airlift Squadron of the District of Columbia Air National Guard (ANG), successfully integrated the Fatigue Avoidance Scheduling Tool FAST into its daily scheduling operations. This integration required the full-time attention of two pilot schedulers, but yielded valuable risk mitigation data that could be used by planners and leaders to predict and adjust critical times of fatigue in the flight schedule. In August 2007, the Air National Guard Aviation Safety Division, under the direction of Lt Col Edward Vaughan, funded a project to improve the user interface of FAST, permitting daily use by pilot schedulers and integration with automated flight scheduling software. This improved, user-responsive interface, known as Flyawake, was conceived and managed by Captain Lynn Lee and developed by Macrosystems. The project cited empirical data collected in combat and non-combat aviation operations, and challenged the U.S. government's established policies regarding fatigue as a factor in degrading human performance.

=== Cockpit design ===
- Head-up display (HUDs) reduce the necessity of the pilot having to focus on the far runway and near instruments. The accommodation process is no longer needed, optimal in diminishing the onset of fatigue.
- Blinking lights on aircraft avionics are extremely effective at capturing a pilot's attention, however, they contribute to fatigue. The maximum benefit is achieved by initially using blinking lights to capture the pilot's attention, but then displaying the message on a steadily lit background.

=== Further considerations ===
Aircraft are becoming increasingly automated, often resulting in the flight crew becoming complacent because of less direct involvement especially during the cruise phases of a long haul flight. Long legs in cruise may cause pilots to become bored, thus incrementing the prevalence of risk because it will take a pilot a longer time to resume full alertness in case of emergency. Airlines schedule two crews or a junior first officer as a strategy to combat boredom during the cruise phases of flight. "Keep Awake" routines are another countermeasure. They consist of small events in flight designed to start a false problem that has previously been inputted by a flight engineer. "Keep awake" routines do not affect flight safety and their purpose reattain the pilot's full alertness and undivided attention.

== Regulations ==
National aviation regulators typically use the hours-of-service approach to prevent fatigue. The hours-of-service is usually measured by flight duty period which is defined as "a period which commences when a flight crew member is required to report for duty... and which finishes when the aircraft is parked with no intention of [further movement]". Limits are generally set on flight duty time across daily, weekly, and monthly time periods. These limits differ based on: what type of operation is being conducted, the time of day, and whether the flight is single-pilot or multi-pilot. There are also requirements for time free from duty after consecutive days on duty.

All ICAO member states place some kind of operational limit, but there are differences in how this is done across nations. A survey of ten nations found that a total of twelve different operational factors were regulated, with each country regulating six factors on average. However, these factors are often measured in different ways and vary significantly in limit.

Many experts in aviation safety find that the current regulations are inadequate in combating fatigue. They point to high prevalence rates and laboratory studies as evidence for the current systems failure. While the current system helps prevent extended sleep deprivation, it does not take into account circadian rhythm disruptions, time of day, or accumulated sleep debt. One study found that the findings show "a need to raise the level of knowledge within the industry regarding the causes and consequences of fatigue and of processes for its management".

== Accidents and incidents related to pilot fatigue ==
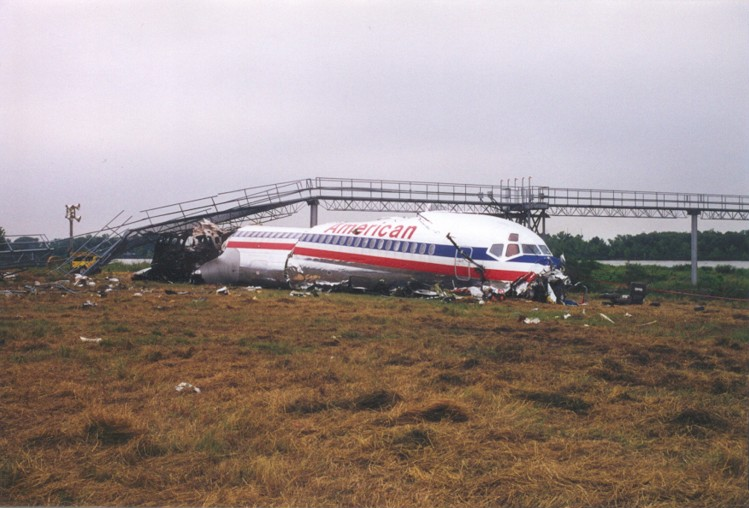
American Airlines Flight 1420 crash in Little Rock, Arkansas

- The May 24, 1981 Ecuadorian Air Force Beechcraft Super King Air crash that killed Ecuadorian president Jaime Roldós Aguilera, his wife and entourage was partly attributed to pilot fatigue in the official investigation. The pilot was also the president's military aide-de-camp, and had reportedly stood beside Roldós for three hours during a military ceremony before the flight. He had been on duty since 6:30 a.m. on the day of the accident, accompanying President Roldós on a tight schedule.
- In 1985, Aeroflot Flight 5143, a Tupolev Tu-154, stalled and crashed in Uzbekistan (then part of the Soviet Union) due to pilot error. Severe crew fatigue was found to have contributed to the accident, which killed all 200 people aboard the aircraft.
- In the September 10, 1992 crash of Expresso Aéreo Flight 015, a Fokker F27-500, in the airstrip of the remote Peruvian Amazon jungle town of Bellavista, fatigue was determined to be a contributing factor. As a small regional airline, the flight's hectic itinerary that day included eleven takeoffs and landings at remote airstrips and airports, most of them difficult to access and with short cycles (flight time) between them. Moreover, the pilot was pressured to meet the schedule, as the flight had been delayed in Juanjuí and still had several airports and airstrips to reach and cross the Andes mountain range in time to return to Trujillo that day. Finally, the co-pilot's lack of experience placed a heavy workload on the pilot, who commanded the aircraft the whole time and became the accident's only fatality.
- American International Airways Flight 808 was a McDonnell Douglas DC-8 that crashed short of the runway at NAS Guantanamo Bay, Cuba, on August 18, 1993. Pilot fatigue was cited as the primary cause.
- Korean Airlines Flight 801 - August 6, 1997 - was a Boeing 747 en route to Antonio Won Pat Airport which crashed into a hill three miles away from the runway. The accident killed 228 out of the 254 people on board, including the flight crew. The captain failed to brief the first officer on the approach procedure and descended below the minimum safe altitude. The captain's fatigue "...degraded his performance and contributed to his failure to properly execute the approach."
- On American Airlines Flight 1420, fatigue was found to be a contributing factor. Eleven people were killed when the McDonnell Douglas MD-82 crashed in Little Rock, Arkansas in 1999.
- Corporate Airlines Flight 5966 crashed short of the runway on approach to Kirksville Regional Airport in 2004 after its fatigued pilots had been on their sixth consecutive day of flight and on duty for 14 hours that day. The NTSB found the accident resulted from the pilots' failure to follow established safety procedures while conducting a non-precision approach in IMC and that "...their fatigue likely contributed to their degraded performance."
- Pilots operating Go! Airlines Flight 1002 in October 2008, a thirty-six-minute leg from Honolulu to Hilo, fell asleep and overshot their destination by 30 nautical miles. Subsequently, they woke up and landed the airplane safely. The incident occurred on the third consecutive day pilots started duty at 5:40 AM.
- Colgan Air Flight 3407 crashed in the US in 2009, killing 50 people (all 49 on board and one person on the ground). The NTSB concluded that the flight crew were experiencing fatigue, but was unable to determine how much it degraded their performance.
- On January 25, 2010, Ethiopian Airlines Flight 409 crashed into the Mediterranean Sea shortly after takeoff from Beirut, Lebanon, killing all 90 occupants on board. It is widely believed that fatigue among the crew was a contributing factor in the accident.
- On May 22, 2010, Air India Express Flight 812 crashed on landing at Mangalore International Airport, India, killing 158 occupants on board. The captain had fallen asleep during the flight, but woke up before the landing.
- Pilot fatigue was identified as a probable contributor to the 2010 Afriqiyah Airways Flight 771 crash in an official report, published on 1 March 2013. The plane with 93 passengers and 11 crew members on board crashed during a go-around at Tripoli airport, killing everyone but one person on board.
- In July 2013, Asiana Airlines Flight 214 crashed at San Francisco International Airport while conducting a visual approach, killing three of the 307 people on board the Boeing 777-200ER. The NTSB determined that the flight crew had mismanaged the approach due to both Boeing and Asiana Airlines inadequate documentation the 777's systems, Asiana Airline's insufficient training, and "flight crew fatigue, which likely degraded their performance".
- August 14, 2013, UPS Airlines Flight 1354 crashed on approach to Birmingham–Shuttlesworth International Airport. Both pilots, the only people on board the aircraft, were killed. The approach was unstabilized due to the flight crew's failure to monitor their altitude and their mismanagement of the flight management computer, both of which were a result of fatigue.
- On January 25, 2024, Batik Air Flight 6723 veered off course for 210 nautical miles during a 28-minute period when both the pilot and copilot were asleep. Both of them woke up later and landed the plane without incident.

== See also ==
- Effects of fatigue on safety
- Pilot error
- Aviation safety
