= Destin Executive Airport =

Airport in Florida, U.S.

Destin Executive Airport Coleman Kelly Field
- IATA: DSI; ICAO: KDTS; FAA LID: DTS

Summary
- Airport type: Public
- Owner: Okaloosa County
- Serves: Destin, Florida
- Hub for: Southern Airways Express
- Elevation AMSL: 22 ft (6.7 m)
- Coordinates: 30°24′00″N 086°28′17″W
- Website: www.FlyDTS.com

Map
- Location of airport in Florida DSI (the United States)

Runways
Direction	Length		Surface
Direction	ft	m	Surface
14/32	5,001	1,524	Asphalt

Statistics
- Aircraft operations (2018): 63,987
- Based aircraft (2022): 61
- Departing passengers (12 months ending September 2019): 640
- Source: Federal Aviation Administration

Destin Executive Airport (IATA: DSI, ICAO: KDTS, FAA LID: DTS), also known as Coleman Kelly Field, is a public use airport owned by and located in Okaloosa County, Florida. The airport is one nautical mile (2 km) east of the central business district of Destin, Florida. It is included in the National Plan of Integrated Airport Systems for 2021–2025, which categorized it as a general aviation facility.

Although many U.S. airports use the same three-letter location identifier for the FAA and IATA, this airport is assigned DTS by the FAA and DSI by the IATA. The airport's ICAO identifier is KDTS. Due to its close proximity to Eglin Air Force Base and the high levels of military flight activity, all flights to or from Destin Executive Airport must adhere to "special air traffic rules" and obtain ATC clearance before entering the Eglin/Valparaiso terminal area. The Destin Executive Airport is an independent general flight office possessed and worked by Okaloosa Area, and is not reliant on ad valorem charges.

== History ==
The first landing at the airport occurred on October 13, 1961. Lucius Burch of Memphis, Tennessee, and two passengers, came for a weekend of fishing. Formerly, Burch had to land in Crestview, Florida, which he described as a "terrible nuisance". The field was being clayed by the county at the request of the Okaloosa Airport and Industrial Authority.

Frank D. Duckett, of Shalimar, Florida, announced that he had opened the area's first air charter service at a Playground Chamber of Commerce meeting on Dec. 8, 1961. Duckett said that the 2,000-foot runway in Destin was being hard surfaced, lights were being installed, and that fuel and maintenance service would be available. He was arranging for rental cars to be parked at the airport for incoming planes. The service offered a Tri-Pacer 135, a four seat aircraft, with other types of aircraft available based on the customer's needs. Duckett said that the rates for the Tri-Pacer would be 5.5 cents per mile, per person, based on a full load of four persons.

A control tower was built at the airport and opened in 2017. The tower was awarded the 2018 General Aviation Airport Project of the Year.

In 2018, the airport was visited by Wings of Freedom, a flying memorial to World War II. Three 1940s era aircraft — a Boeing B-17 Flying Fortress, a Consolidated B-24 Liberator and a TF-51D Mustang Fighter — visited the airport for tours and flight tours.

In January 2025, the airport hosted Florida Governor Ron DeSantis for a talk.

=== 2025 lawsuits ===
==== Racketeering lawsuit ====
In February 2025, the Okaloosa County Airports Director and a local businessman filed a lawsuit against a former business partner alleging he targeted them and tried to gain control of the Destin Executive Airport via extortion, malicious prosecution, and interference with business relations.

The plaintiffs allege that the former business partner tried to bribe the Director in exchange for continued enforcement of airport oversight measures, adding that the business partner attempted to illegitimately have the Director removed from his position.

==== FAA investigation ====
In 2025, the airport's owner, Okaloosa County, was found to have violated multiple grant rules tied to its management of the Destin Executive Airport. The finding was rooted in a complaint that the airport allowed a single fixed-base operator to monopolize airport services, limiting competition and access; it was found that the county enabled lease assumptions, consolidations, assignments and ratifications at DTS, despite past warnings from the FAA Southern Region staff.

In particular, it was found that the owner of Destin Jet, one of the FBOs at the airport, acquired a controlling stake in the airport's other FBO without the county's knowledge, granting him exclusive control of all services available at the airport. The county subsequently ratified the consolidation of the two for the purpose of resolving unpaid debts from the previous operator and increasing fuel flowage fee.

This action lead to a back-and-forth between the county and the FAA. The FAA ordered Okaloosa to submit a corrective action plan and said funds would be withheld until it was sent; the Okaloosa County Commission voted to appeal the ruling.

Plans for the merger date back to at least 2015.

== Facilities and aircraft ==
Destin Executive Airport covers an area of 395 acres (160 ha) at an elevation of 22 feet (7 m) above mean sea level. It has one runway designated 14/32 with an asphalt surface measuring 5,001 by 100 ft (1,524 by 30 m).

The airport has a fixed-base operator that sells both 100LL Avgas and jet fuel. It offers services such as general maintenance, catering, a hangar, and courtesy/rental cars. Amenities such as a conference room, vending machines, pilot supplies, a crew lounge, snooze rooms, and showers are also available.

For the 12-month period ending December 31, 2018, the airport had 63,987 aircraft operations, an average of 175 per day: 99% general aviation, 1% air taxi and less than 1% military. In April 2022, there were 61 aircraft based at this airport: 31 single-engine and 14 multi-engine aircraft, 11 jets and 5 helicopters.

== Airline and destinations ==
In 2019, both Southern Airways Express and Air Choice One announced plans to serve Destin Executive. Southern announced a weekend connection from Tampa in April 2019. That July, Air Choice One announced plans to fly from Jonesboro, Arkansas to Destin. Neither service is active as of June 2025.

In 2021, commuter airline JSX announced its intention to serve Destin Executive Airport from its Dallas hub. The airline chose to avoid the larger Destin–Fort Walton Beach Airport in an attempt to make passenger access easier and painless.

Airlines offering scheduled passenger service to non-stop destinations:

Airlines	Destinations	Refs.
JSX	Seasonal: Dallas–Love	

== Accidents and incidents ==
- The first fatal aircraft accident recorded at the Destin Executive Airport occurred on February 16, 1975, when a Cessna 210 with three people on board crashed shortly after a 0100 hrs. (1AM, local standard time) departure from the facility, the single-engined propeller cabin monoplane coming down one quarter mile from the runway in an area platted for the future Kelly Estates subdivision. All three were killed, the airframe burning completely with bodies burnt beyond recognition. Officials said that the plane was flying under a 200-foot ceiling with poor visibility. No flight plan had been filed. An investigator of the Federal Aviation Administration stated that there was no immediate evidence of mechanical failure.
- On April 17, 1983, a Beechcraft Bonanza clipped power lines and crashed south of the airport and knocked out power to most of Destin for hours. The pilot and passenger survived.
- On December 24, 1987, a Cessna 150 attempting a landing at Destin Executive Airport was caught by the sudden onset of fog as it circled to land which cut visibility to nothing. The plane struck the 19th floor of the Hidden Dunes Resort, becoming lodged in the wall of unit 1901 by the fuselage and landing gear. The 39-year old pilot was seriously injured and his 31-year-old female passenger died on site from injuries from the impact. There was no fire. The pilot was pulled into the building through a window on the 18th floor. "A National Transportation Safety Board investigation later found [the pilot] to be at fault for the crash, having planned poorly by not accounting for the fog that was in the area and not being rated to fly in conditions that required instruments to navigate."
- On March 5, 2005, a Piper PA-32 experienced a nose gear collapse after departing the side of the runway during the takeoff roll. The pilot reported that the aircraft suddenly swerved at about rotation speed and came to rest at the side of the runway. The probable cause of the accident was found to be the pilot's inadequate compensation for wind during a crosswind takeoff resulting in a loss of directional control and subsequent collision with terrain.
- On January 18, 2006, a Cessna 310 experienced a landing gear collapse at the Destin Executive Airport. It was found that the down limit switch, which operates the landing gear mechanical stop, was bent in the up position and allowed the gear motor to continued to run, causing the gearbox to over-travel, pull on the landing gear rods, and retract the landing gear during landing.
- On April 5, 2006, a Mooney M20R crashed while attempting a go-around at the Destin Executive Airport. While attempting to touch down, he was blown to the side of the runway by a strong wind gust. He added full power and pulled up abruptly to avoid runway lights, at which point the aircraft's stall warning activated; the pilot subsequently lowered the nose but did not have enough airspeed to maintain altitude. While attempting to return to the runway, there was a sudden "spin" to the left. The probable cause of the accident was found to be the pilot's failure to maintain airspeed while attempting a go-around at a low altitude which resulted in an inadvertent stall/mush, an uncontrolled descent and an impact with terrain.
- On July 20, 2006, a Lancair 320 experienced engine vibrations inflight and successfully diverted to the Destin Executive Airport. The cause of the incident was found to be the separation of a portion of a propeller blade due to fatigue cracking which initiated in an area of corrosion that was not detected during propeller overhaul 10 flight hours before the accident. Later that year, on December 24, 2007, a Piper PA-32 successfully diverted to the Destin Executive Airport after experiencing an engine fire midflight.
- On May 31, 2009, a Cessna 182 Skylane was damaged after a hard landing at the Destin Executive Airport. The probable cause of the incident was found to be the pilot's improper recovery from a bounced landing.
- On November 26, 2015, a Robinson R44 was damaged while doing a power check before a tour flight. The pilot heard a loud pop while raising the collective, so he lowered the collective and secured the helicopter. Postaccident examination of the helicopter revealed that an overstress fracture existed between the tail rotor driveshaft and intermediate flex plate. The reason for the overstress could not be determined with the available evidence.
- On February 12, 2016, a Piper PA28 Archer II collided with water while maneuvering to land at the Destin Executive Airport. After flying a normal traffic pattern, the airplane overshot a turn to line up with the runway and flew out over the water, where it crashed. The probable cause of the accident was found to be spatial disorientation and loss of aircraft control due to the noninstrument-rated pilot's decision to turn the airplane away from the lighted airport at low altitude, over water, with no visible horizon, in dark night conditions.
- On August 2, 2016, a Cessna 414A Chancellor crashed into the Gulf of Mexico after departing the Destin Executive Airport. After climbing to 1,000', the aircraft entered a steep right turn and descended at a steep rate before impacting the water in a nose-low attitude. The probable cause of the accident was found to be the pilot's loss of control due to spatial disorientation shortly after takeoff, while maneuvering over water during dark night conditions.
- On November 17, 2016 a Cessna 172 Skyhawk registered to the US Air Force was damaged during an instructional flight at the Destin Executive Airport. After trouble controlling the airplane during a touch-and-go, the student attempted a go-around. The student and instructor heard a bang as the aircraft took off again and assumed they had struck a runway light; during a post-flight inspection, the left horizontal stabilizer was found to be damaged. The probable cause of the incident was found to be the student pilot’s overcorrection with right rudder, which resulted in a loss of directional control, and the flight instructor’s delayed remedial action.
- On June 9, 2022, a Piper PA46 Malibu series aircraft suffered a landing gear collapse during taxi at the Destin Executive Airport.
- On June 17, 2023, a Piper Saratoga crashed on landing at the Destin Executive Airport. At the time, the Okaloosa County Sheriff’s Office reported the aircraft hit a puddle of water while landing and subsequently slid off the runway, collapsing its landing gear.

== See also ==
- Destin-Fort Walton Beach Airport (VPS) located within Eglin Air Force Base (30°28′59″N 086°31′34″W)
- List of airports in Florida
