= Fatigue Avoidance Scheduling Tool =

Human performance evaluation program

Fatigue is a major human factors issue in aviation safety. The Fatigue Avoidance Scheduling Tool (FAST) was developed by the United States Air Force in 2000–2001 to address the problem of aircrew fatigue in aircrew flight scheduling. FAST is a Windows program that allows scientists, planners and schedulers to quantify the effects of various work-rest schedules on human performance. It allows work and sleep data entry in graphic, symbolic (grid) and text formats. The graphic input-output display shows cognitive performance effectiveness (y axis) as a function of time (x axis). An upper green area on the graph ends at the time for normal sleep, 90% effectiveness. The goal of the planner or scheduler is to keep performance effectiveness at or above 90% by manipulating the timing and lengths of work and rest periods. A work schedule is entered as red bands on the time line. Sleep periods are entered as blue bands across the time line, below the red bands.

The calculated performance effectiveness represents composite human performance on a number of cognitive tasks, scaled from zero to 100%. The oscillating line in the graph represents expected group average performance on these tasks as determined by time of day, circadian rhythm, time spent awake, and amount of sleep, and various confidence limits around the average may be displayed. The graphic display may be cut and pasted into reports and briefing slides. Cognitive effectiveness estimates for work periods of any length may also be cut and pasted in tabular format.

== History ==
FAST was developed under Phase 1 and 2 Small Business Innovation Research (SBIR) contract awards from the US Air Force Research Laboratory (AFRL), Human Effectiveness Directorate, to NTI, Inc. (Dr. Douglas R. Eddy, Principal Investigator) with Science Applications International Corporation as a subcontractor (Dr. Steven R. Hursh, Modeler). Fatigue predictions in FAST are derived from the Sleep, Activity, Fatigue, and Task Effectiveness (SAFTE) simulation invented by Dr. Hursh, currently the President of the Institutes for Behavior Resources and Adjunct Professor of Behavioral Biology, Johns Hopkins University School of Medicine.

The SAFTE simulation integrates quantitative information about (1) the circadian rhythm in metabolic rate; (2) cognitive performance recovery rates associated with sleep, and cognitive performance decay rates associated with wakefulness; and (3) cognitive performance effects associated with sleep inertia to produce a 3-process model of human cognitive effectiveness. The SAFTE model has been under development by Dr. Hursh for more than a decade. In the general architecture of the SAFTE model, a circadian process influences both cognitive effectiveness and sleep regulation. Sleep regulation is dependent upon hours of sleep, hours of wakefulness, current sleep debt, the circadian process and sleep fragmentation (awakenings during a sleep period). Cognitive effectiveness is dependent upon the current balance of the sleep regulation process, the circadian process, and sleep inertia.

The SAFTE simulation has received a broad scientific review and the DoD considers it a complete, accurate, and operationally practical model to aid operator scheduling. The SAFTE simulation's software implementation and applicabilities have since been validated in aviation and railroad work environments.

During the Phase 2 effort, the model was refined with findings from AF research and other studies providing a blood alcohol index, lapse index, sleep timing algorithm, and interface features (performance variation percentiles, mission timeline, grid input, and fatigue factors dashboard, to name a few). FAST provided the military physiologist the first computerized tool that used a homeostatic model for optimizing aviator performance under conditions of limited sleep while minimizing the need for pharmacological aids. Missions could be planned that provided sufficient rest to maintain effective performance and, when normal, nocturnal sleep was impossible, arrange interventions such as naps or pharmacological treatments to maintain performance. The tool was intended to improve flight safety, optimize mission success during sustained operations, and minimize the need for pharmacological aids.

During the Phase 2 and Phase 3 efforts, the FAST team had the opportunity to train different groups of AF personnel on the use of FAST to solve fatigue problems they were having with sustained operations, overseas deployment, and night training operations. The training was accomplished with numerous groups in part through several of the USAF School of Aerospace Medicine's (USAFSAM) educational functions (2002–2007) and in part through the AFRL Aviation Fatigue Countermeasures Workshop taught approximately tri-annually by Drs. John A. Caldwell, J. Lynn Caldwell, and James C. Miller. Students over the years included flight surgeons, aerospace physiologists and aerospace physiology technicians on annual training; aerospace physiologists and aerospace physiology technicians during initial training; flight surgeons participating in USAFSAM's Residency in Aerospace Medicine (RAM) and Advanced Aerospace medicine for International Medical officers (AAMIMO) programs; and aviation safety officers from The U.S. Air Force, Navy, Marines, and Army, and from the Canadian Forces. Many of these new users recommended that the FAST product be transformed in several ways to make it more useful to operational units.

FAST was used successfully by the development team, Air Force researchers, and several AF operational units to solve fatigue problems throughout AF operations. Scientists in the Warfighter Fatigue Countermeasures Branch (WFC, now AFRL/RHPF) and operators used FAST to identify and avoid fatigue in more than 2,000 hours of B-2 Spirit bomber operations from Whiteman AFB and night operations at Shaw AFB, to optimize shift work schedules for security forces at Brooks AFB, to assess the impact of sleep loss and night operations in accident investigation, and many other consults. During the period 2000–2007, Dr. Miller used FAST to assist USAF mishap investigation boards in at least nine investigations of aviation mishaps. Additionally, FAST was used to prepare guidance for various operational units in the United States and Canada. These FAST users had no problems entering data, trying different schedules, making modifications to existing schedules, or interpreting results. However, all of these applications involved experts or personnel that they had trained. Attempts to apply FAST to daily flying scheduling operations were unsuccessful because the user interface was designed originally for scientists, not for operators.

The Federal Railroad Administration sponsored a major evaluation of the SAFTE biomathematical fatigue model (or simulation) to determine if it could predict increased risk of railroad accidents based on work schedule information (Hursh, Raslear et al., 2006). The project examined 30-day work histories of locomotive crews prior to 400 human factors accidents and 1000 nonhuman factors accidents. SAFTE estimated crew effectiveness (the inverse of fatigue) based entirely on work schedule information and opportunities to obtain sleep. Over 1 million 30-min work intervals were evaluated based on data from five US freight railroads. A reliable linear relationship existed between crew effectiveness and the risk of human factors accidents (r = - 0.93), but not for non-human factors accidents. The risk of human factors accidents was elevated at effectiveness scores below 90 and increased progressively with reduced effectiveness. At an effectiveness score ≤ 50, human factors accidents were 65 percent more likely than chance. Below an effectiveness score of 70, accident cause codes indicated the kinds of operator errors consistent with fatigue, confirming that the relationship between accident risk and effectiveness was meaningful. Further analysis indicated that SAFTE/FAST also predicted an increase in accident severity; human factors accidents that occurred when average effectiveness was calculated to be less than 77 were 2½ times more costly than similar accidents that occurred when effectiveness was greater than 90.

In 2005, AFRL awarded a 3-year, Phase 3 SBIR contract to NTI to develop and demonstrate a browser-based, predictive and quantitative fatigue-management software tool for mission planning, crew performance assessment, and status reporting, based upon FAST. A “24/7 Operational Effectiveness Toolset” was developed as an Internet-based tool accessible through a browser, providing support for the scheduling of regular, cyclic work and rest (regularly rotating shiftwork), for irregular work-rest schedules, for the effects of pharmaceutical countermeasures, and for the formal Operational Risk Management (ORM) of fatigue effects. Specific user groups selected for interface design included mission (flight) schedulers, pilots, mishap investigators, and shift work schedulers. Usability tests of the interfaces were conducted to determine if they met the needs of expert users and the tool was easy to learn for novices. The final reports for this project were reviewed at AFRL in November 2008. The project was never brought to fruition.

== Present status ==
FAST is now a commercial product marketed through Fatigue Science and Institutes for Behavior Resources.

== U.S. Navy ==
In the U.S. Navy, Aviation Safety Officer (ASO) students and prospective commanders of naval aviation squadrons began to be introduced to FAST in the School of Aviation Safety (SAS) courses in October 2004. Navy and Army student Flight Surgeons received a 2-hour computer lab introduction to FAST. CAPT (Dr.) Nick Davenport was the person who added FAST to those curricula. As a result of a FAST evaluation meeting that was held at the Naval Safety Center (NSC) on 26 April 2006, the NSC mandated that all Flight Surgeons use FAST in analyzing the 72-hour and 14-day histories in aviation mishap investigations. FAST has often assisted in identifying fatigue effects that would have been missed otherwise, and occasionally has helped rule out fatigue in cases where it was suspected.

== FlyAwake ==
In early 2007, the 201 Airlift Squadron of the District of Columbia Air National Guard (ANG), successfully integrated its own version of the SAFTE simulation into its daily scheduling operations. This version was never validated against the original SAFTE simulation. This integration required the full-time attention of two pilot schedulers, but yielded valuable risk mitigation data that could be used by planners and leaders to predict and adjust critical times of fatigue in the flight schedule. In August 2007, the Air National Guard Aviation Safety Division, under the direction of Lt Col Edward Vaughan, funded a project to provide a user interface for daily use by pilot schedulers and integration with automated flight scheduling software. This user-responsive interface, known as 'FlyAwake', was conceived and managed by Captain Lynn Lee. The project cited empirical data collected in combat and non-combat aviation operations, and challenged existing crew rest policies as adequate in preventing degraded human performance.

== See also ==
- Circadian rhythm
- Circasemidian rhythm
- Fatigue detection software
- Pilot fatigue
- Shift work
- Sleep hygiene
