= Metal Fatigue =

Metal fatigue is the initiation and propagation of cracks in a material due to cyclic loading.

Metal Fatigue may also refer to:

- Metal Fatigue (album), a 1985 album by Allan Holdsworth.
- Metal Fatigue (novel), a 1996 science fiction novel by Sean Williams.
- Metal Fatigue (video game), a 2000 real-time strategy video game by Zono Incorporated.
