= Effects of fatigue on safety =

Why the hours of service are important: a graph outlining the relationship between number of hours driven and the percent of crashes related to driver fatigue. Source: Federal Motor Carrier Safety Administration

Fatigue is a major safety concern in many fields, but especially in transportation, because fatigue can result in disastrous accidents. Fatigue is considered an internal precondition for unsafe acts because it negatively affects the human operator's internal state. Research has generally focused on pilots, truck drivers, and shift workers.

Fatigue can be a symptom of a medical problem, but more commonly it is a normal physiological reaction to exertion, lack of sleep, boredom, changes to sleep-wake schedules (including jet lag), or stress.

In some cases, driving after 18–24 hours without sleep is equivalent to a blood alcohol content of 0.05%–0.10%.

== Types ==
Fatigue can be both physical and mental. Physical fatigue is the inability to continue functioning at the level of one's normal abilities; a person with physical fatigue cannot lift as heavy a box or walk as far as he could if not fatigued.

Mental fatigue, on the other hand, rather manifests in sleepiness or slowness. A person with mental fatigue may fall asleep, may react very slowly, or may be inattentive. With microsleeps, the person may be unaware that he was asleep. Without proper amount of sleep, it will feel like certain tasks seem complicated, concentration will drop and ultimately result in fatal mistakes

== Factors ==
The Federal Motor Carrier Safety Administration identifies three main factors in driver fatigue: Circadian rhythm effects, sleep deprivation and cumulative fatigue effects, and industrial or "time-on-task" fatigue.

- Circadian rhythm effects describe the tendency for humans to experience a normal cycle in attentiveness and sleepiness through the 24-hour day. Those with a conventional sleep pattern (sleeping for seven or eight hours at night) experience periods of maximum fatigue in the early hours of the morning and a lesser period in the early afternoon. During the low points of this cycle, one experiences reduced attentiveness. During the high points, it is difficult to sleep soundly. The cycle is anchored in part by ambient lighting (darkness causes a person's body to release the hormone melatonin, which induces sleep), and by a person's imposed pattern of regular sleeping and waking times. The influence of the day-night cycle is never fully displaced (artificial lighting inhibits melatonin release more weakly than sunlight), and the performance of night shift workers usually suffers. Circadian rhythms are persistent, and can only be shifted by one to two hours forward or backward per day. Changing the starting time of a work shift by more than these amounts will reduce attentiveness, which is common after the first night shift following a "weekend" break during which conventional sleep times were followed. This effect can also be seen in non-shift-workers who revert to a later schedule on the weekend and experience fatigue and sleepiness when returning to work early on Monday morning. The effects of sleep deprivation vary substantially from person to person.
- Sleep deprivation and cumulative fatigue effects describe how individuals who fail to have an adequate period of sleep (7–8 hours in 24 hours) or who have been awake longer than the conventional 16–17 hours will suffer sleep deprivation. A sleep deficit accumulates with successive sleep-deprived days, and additional fatigue may be caused by breaking daily sleep into two shorter periods in place of a single unbroken period of sleep. A sleep deficit is not instantly reduced by one night's sleep; it may take two or three conventional sleep cycles for an individual to return to unimpaired performance.
- Industrial or "time-on-task" fatigue describes fatigue that is accumulated during the working period, and affects performance at different times during the shift. Performance declines the longer a person is engaged in a task, gradually during the first few hours and more steeply toward the end of a long period at work. Reduced performance has also been observed in the first hour of work as an individual adjusts to the working environment.

In addition to the primary factors identified by the FAA, other potential contributors to fatigue during transportation have been identified. These include endogenous factors such as mental stress and age of the vehicle operator, as well as exogenous or environmental stressors, such as the presence of non sea-level cabin pressure in-flight, vehicle noise, and vehicle vibration/acceleration (which contributes to the sopite syndrome). Many of the exogenous contributors merit further study because they are present during transportation operations but not in most lab studies of fatigue.

== In aviation ==
The International Civil Aviation Organization (ICAO) that codifies standards and regulations for international air-navigation defines fatigue as: "A physiological state of reduced mental or physical performance capability resulting from sleep loss or extended wakefulness, circadian phase, or workload (mental and/or physical activity) that can impair a crew member's alertness and ability to safely operate an aircraft or perform safety related duties."

Human factors are the primary causal factor aviation accidents. In 1999, the National Aeronautics and Space Administration, NASA, testified before the U.S. House of Representatives that pilot fatigue impacts aviation safety with "unknown magnitude". The report cited evidence of fatigue issues in areas including aviation operations, laboratory studies, high-fidelity simulations, and surveys. The report indicates that studies consistently show that fatigue is an ongoing problem in aviation safety. In 2009, Aerospace Medical Association listed long duty work hours, insufficient sleep, and circadian disruptions as few of the largest contributing factors to pilot fatigue. Fatigue can result in pilot error, slowed responses, missed opportunities, and incorrect responses to emergency situations.

A November 2007 report by the National Transportation Safety Board indicates that air crew fatigue is a much larger, and more widespread, problem than previously reported. The report indicates that since 1993 there have been 10 major airline crashes caused by aircrew fatigue, resulting in 260 fatalities. Additionally, a voluntary anonymous reporting system known as ASAP, Aviation Safety Action Program, reveals widespread concern among aviation professionals about the safety implications of fatigue. The NTSB published that FAA's response to fatigue is unacceptable and listed the issue among its "Most Wanted" safety issues.

Safety experts estimate that pilot fatigue contributes to 15-20% of fatal aviation accidents caused by human error. They also establish that probability of a human factor accident increases with the time pilots are on duty, especially for duty periods of 13 hours and above (see following statements):

"It is estimated (e.g. by the NTSB) that fatigue contributes to 20-30% of transport accidents (i.e. air, sea, road, rail). Since, in commercial aviation operations, about 70% of fatal accidents are related to human error, it can be assumed that the risk of the fatigue of the operating crew contributes about 15-20% to the overall accident rate. The same view of fatigue as a major risk factor is shared by leading scientists in the area, as documented in several consensus statements."

"For 10-12 hours of duty time the proportion of accident pilots with this length of duty period is 1.7 times as large as for all pilots. For pilots with 13 or more hours of duty, the proportion of accident pilot duty periods is over five and a half times as high. [...] 20% of human factor accidents occurred to pilots who had been on duty for 10 or more hours, but only 10% of pilot duty hours occurred during that time. Similarly, 5% of human factor accidents occurred to pilots who had been on duty for 13 or more hours, where only 1% of pilot duty hours occur during that time. There is a discernible pattern of increased probability of an accident the greater the hours of duty time for pilots.".

== Among drivers ==
Many countries regulate working hours for truck drivers to reduce accidents caused by driver fatigue. The number of hours spent driving has a strong correlation to the number of fatigue-related accidents. According to numerous studies, the risk of fatigue is greatest between the hours of midnight and six in the morning, and increases with the total length of the driver's trip.

== Among healthcare providers ==
Fatigue among doctors is a recognized problem. It can impair performance, causing harm to patients. A study using anonymous surveys completed by junior doctors in New Zealand found that 30% of respondents scored as "excessively sleepy" on the Epworth Sleepiness Scale and 42% could recall a fatigue-related clinical error in the past six months.

In the US, shift length is limited for nurses by federal regulation and some state laws.

== On ships ==
Fatigue on board is still a major factor of accidents which lead to casualties, damage and pollution. Studies show that most accidents happen during the night peaking around 4 AM, due to the Circadian rhythm of humans. Studies like Project Horizon have recently been done to analyse which factors cause this fatigue. The lack of sleep and quality of the sleep are two of the main issues. The lack of sleep is due to the long hours that the workers (especially the officers) have to do (work weeks of 70 hours +). Quality of their sleep may be affected by a variety of factors: quality of the food on board, the vibrations due to the engine and waves, the noise of repair or works or engine, only naps (not sleeping eight hours in a single run but two or three naps a day) because of the watch system and secondary jobs. Stress on board especially when arriving in port when all hands have to be on deck whatever the time.

With companies trying to reduce the costs there is less crew. Turn around in port have to be as fast as possible because the time spent in ports is very expensive. All of this adds work and stress to the crew on board which drains them of their energy which will lead to errors due to fatigue. The ILO have conventions for trying to restrict the maximum working hours on board and to determine the minimum rest period of seafarers. As the maritime industry is highly competitive, and there are fewer and fewer crew members on board, it makes it difficult to avoid working overtime.

== See also ==
- Artificial Passenger
- Fatigue Avoidance Scheduling Tool
- Human reliability
- Occupational safety and health
- Sleep-deprived driving
