= Battle fatigue =

Battle fatigue is may refer to:

- Combat stress reaction, a military term for an acute reaction to the stress of battle commonly involving fatigue, slowed reaction time, indecision, and other symptoms
- Posttraumatic stress disorder, a medical term for a chronic disorder associated with psychological trauma
- Shell shock, a term used in World War I for an uncontrolled strong nervous reaction to the battle's horrible and extreme inhuman conditions
