= Jackson Regional Airport =

Airport in Madison County, Tennessee

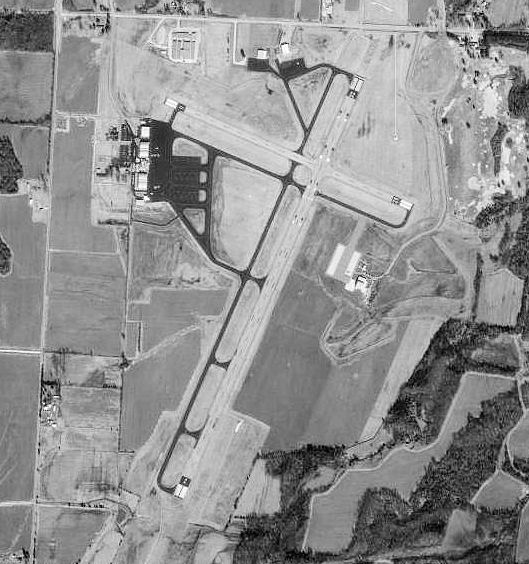
- USGS 1997 orthophoto
- IATA: MKL; ICAO: KMKL; FAA LID: MKL

Summary
- Airport type: Public
- Owner: City of Jackson & Madison County
- Serves: Jackson metropolitan area
- Location: Madison County
- Elevation AMSL: 434 ft (132 m)
- Coordinates: 35°35′59″N 88°54′56″W
- Website: FlyJackson.com

Map
- Location of airport in Tennessee MKL (the United States)

Runways
Direction	Length		Surface
Direction	ft	m	Surface
2/20	6,005	1,831	Asphalt
11/29	3,539	1,078	Asphalt

Statistics
- Aircraft operations (2018): 16,220
- Based aircraft (2022): 59
- Departing passengers (12 months ending July 2020): 3,720
- Source: Federal Aviation Administration

Jackson Regional Airport (IATA: MKL, ICAO: KMKL, FAA LID: MKL) (formerly McKellar-Sipes Regional Airport) is a public use airport located four nautical miles (7 km) west of the central business district of Jackson, a city in Madison County, Tennessee, United States. It is owned by the city and county. The airport is mostly used for general aviation, and is served by one commercial airline, Denver Air Connection, subsidized by the Essential Air Service program. Denver Air Connection operates six days a week, offering round-trip services to Chicago, Illinois via O'Hare International Airport and Atlanta, Georgia via Hartsfield–Jackson Atlanta International Airport.

The National Plan of Integrated Airport Systems for 2021–2025 categorized it as a non-primary commercial service airport.

== Facilities and aircraft ==
Jackson Regional Airport covers an area of 807 acres (327 ha) at an elevation of 434 feet (132 m) above mean sea level. It has two asphalt paved runways: 2/20 is 6,005 by 150 feet (1,831 x 46 m) and 11/29 is 3,539 by 100 feet (1,078 x 30 m).

For the 12-month period ending August 30, 2018, the airport had 16,220 aircraft operations, an average of 44 per day: 81% general aviation, 10% air taxi and 9% military. In March 2022, there were 59 aircraft based at this airport: 31 single-engine, 11 multi-engine, 6 jet, 3 helicopter and 8 military.

== History ==
The airport was established by and originally named in memory of Kenneth Douglas McKellar (1869–1957), a longtime U.S. senator from Tennessee. He helped to convince the Civil Works Administration to acquire the property and construct the initial runways and buildings during the winter of 1933–1934. Later in the 1930s, the Works Project Administration (WPA) expanded the airport and constructed additional buildings and other facilities.

=== McKellar Field ===
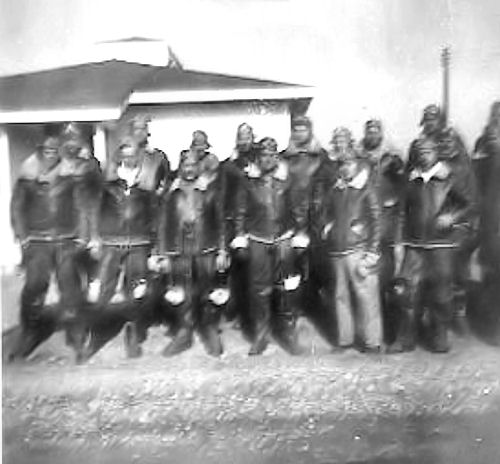
McKellar Field – Class 44D student officers

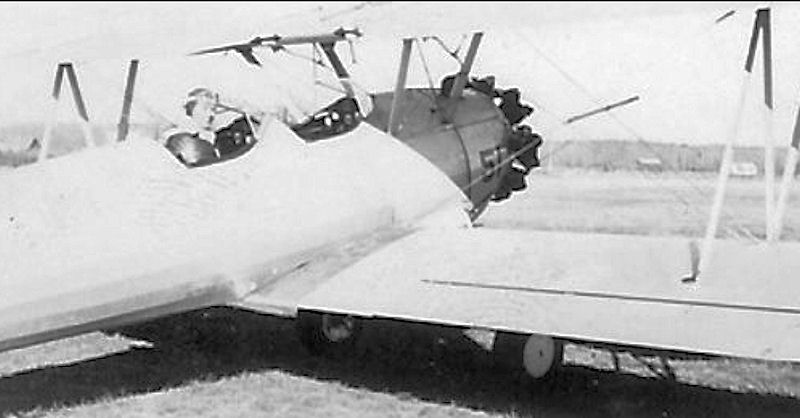
PT-17 Stearman primary training aircraft

In preparation for the eventual U.S. entry into World War II, the United States Army Air Corps sought to expand the nation's combat air forces by asking civilian flight schools to provide the primary phase of training for air cadets. Consequently, it contracted with civilian flying schools to provide primary flying training, with the graduates being moved on to basic and advanced training at regular military training airfields.

In April 1942 the airport was leased by the United States Army Air Forces and became a wartime flight training school. McKellar Field was assigned to the Southeast Training Center (later the Eastern Flying Training Command) as a primary (level 1) pilot training airfield. It was under the command of the 68th Flying Training Detachment, 29th Flying Training Wing. The airfield began training flying cadets under contract to Georgia Air Services, Inc. Flying training was performed with PT-17 Stearman biplanes as the primary trainer. It also had several Fairchild PT-19, Ryan PT-22 Recruits and PT-27 Kaydets assigned.

The physical facilities of McKellar Field included administrative buildings and quarters for officers and enlisted men, encircling a central location. A consolidated mess hall, which accommodated 1,000 enlisted men and a limited number of' officers, was located nearby. Adjacent to the mess hall was a Post Exchange, a Service Club and a dance floor.

The facility was inactivated on October 16, 1944 with the drawdown of AAFTC's pilot training program. It was declared surplus and turned over to the Army Corps of Engineers on September 30, 1945. Eventually it was discharged to the War Assets Administration (WAA) and became a civil airport.

=== Jackson Regional Airport ===
After the war, the airport reverted to the control of the city and county, and was expanded over the years with new facilities to accommodate the needs of Jackson and Madison County. Nearly all of the wartime buildings erected at the airport were torn down or moved, although four of the wartime hangars remain in use at the airport. A few of the streets from McKellar Field remain visible in aerial photography but other than some isolated concrete remaining, the station area has been totally removed.

A military presence remains at the airport, with the Tennessee Army National Guard's 1/230th Air Cavalry Squadron having an extensive support facility at the airport, equipped with UH-60 Blackhawk helicopters.

In the 1970s, the airport name was changed to McKellar–Sipes Regional Airport to honor Major Robert Ray "Buster" Sipes, a United States Air Force test pilot from Jackson, who was killed in 1969 when his RF-101 Voodoo jet fighter crashed after takeoff from RAF Upper Heyford, Oxfordshire, England. A plaque is located in the Church of St. Peter & St. Paul at Steeple Aston to honor his memory. Sipes is buried at the Shiloh National Military Park cemetery.

The airport was renamed again in December, 2024 to Jackson Regional Airport as part of a marketing plan focused on improving the airport's visibility in its market area.

== Airline and destinations ==
The following airline offers scheduled passenger service:

Airlines	Destinations
Denver Air Connection	Atlanta, Chicago–O'Hare

=== Historical airline service ===
Southern Airways began service to Jackson TN on November 1, 1960 with 4 daily departures (2 to Memphis & 2 to Nashville), using DC-3 equipment. In the early 1960s, they upgraded 2 of the flights to larger Martin 404 planes. By the early 1970s, Southern was using DC-9 jet service on some flights. Southern continued to serve Jackson until their merger with North Central Airlines in 1979. The merged airlines' new name became Republic Airlines. Republic served the city until they left the airport in 1981.

SeaPort Airlines began its services to Memphis and Nashville on January 22, 2012. In September 2016, however, liquidation of SeaPort Airlines took place subsequent to its bankruptcy. Air Choice One took over in June 2016 with flights to St. Louis and, later, to Atlanta.

== Statistics ==
Top domestic destinations (August 2025 – July 2026)
Rank	Airport name	Passengers	Airline
1	Chicago–O’Hare, Illinois	6,210	Denver Air Connection
2	(Georgia (U.S. state)) Atlanta, Georgia	5,870	Denver Air Connection

Passenger boardings (enplanements) by year, as per the FAA
Year	2009	2010	2011	2012	2013	2014	2015	2016	2017	2018	2019
Enplanements	1,502	2,545	484	2,037	2,775	1,656	1,800	3,661	4,007	5,706	5,791
Change	▲1,020.9%	▲69.4%	▼81.0%	▲320.9%	▲36.2%	▼40.3%	▲8.7%	▲103.4%	▲9.5%	▲42.0%	▲1.5%
Airline	Pacific Wings dba TennesseeSkies	Pacific Wings dba TennesseeSkies	Pacific Wings dba TennesseeSkies	SeaPort Airlines	SeaPort Airlines	SeaPort Airlines	SeaPort Airlines	Air Choice One	Air Choice One	Air Choice One	Air Choice One
Destination(s)	Nashville	Nashville	Nashville	Memphis Nashville	Memphis Nashville	Memphis Nashville	Memphis Nashville	St. Louis	St. Louis	Atlanta St. Louis	Atlanta St. Louis

== See also ==
- List of airports in Tennessee
- Tennessee World War II Army Airfields
- 29th Flying Training Wing (U.S. Army Air Forces)

== Other sources ==
- This article incorporates public domain material from the Air Force Historical Research Agency
- Manning, Thomas A. (2005), History of Air Education and Training Command, 1942–2002. Office of History and Research, Headquarters, AETC, Randolph AFB, Texas OCLC 71006954, 29991467
- Shaw, Frederick J. (2004), Locating Air Force Base Sites, History’s Legacy, Air Force History and Museums Program, United States Air Force, Washington DC. OCLC 57007862, 1050653629
- Essential Air Service documents (Docket OST-2000-7857) from the U.S. Department of Transportation:
  - Order 2005-6-14 (June 20, 2005): reselecting RegionsAir, Inc. d/b/a American Connection, formerly known as Corporate Airlines, to provide subsidized essential air service (EAS) at each of the above communities (Burlington, IA; Cape Girardeau, MO; Ft. Leonard Wood, MO; Jackson, TN; Marion/Herrin, IL; Owensboro, KY; Kirksville, MO) for a new two-year period from June 1, 2005, through May 31, 2007, for a combined annual subsidy of $7,306,249. Also by this order, the Department is terminating the show-cause proceeding tentatively terminating subsidy at Kirksville, Missouri, as RegionsAir's selected proposal is below the $200-per-passenger cap.
  - Order 2007-3-5 (March 14, 2007): selecting Big Sky Transportation Co., d/b/a Big Sky Airlines, and Great Lakes Aviation, Ltd. to provide subsidized essential air service (EAS) at the above communities (Burlington, IA; Cape Girardeau, MO; Fort Leonard Wood, MO; Jackson, TN; Marion/Herrin, IL, Owensboro, KY) for the two-year period from June 1, 2007, through May 31, 2009, using 19-seat Beech 1900D turboprop aircraft as follows: Big Sky at Cape Girardeau, Jackson, and Owensboro for a combined annual subsidy of $3,247,440; and Great Lakes at Burlington, Fort Leonard Wood, and Marion/Herrin for a combined annual subsidy of $2,590,461.
  - Order 2008-2-1 (February 6, 2008): selecting Great Lakes Aviation, Ltd. to provide subsidized essential air service at Cape Girardeau, Missouri and Jackson, Tennessee and Owensboro, Kentucky for the two-year period beginning when the carrier starts full EAS at all three communities.
  - Order 2009-6-17 (June 22, 2009): selecting Pacific Wings, LLC to provide essential air service (EAS) at Owensboro, Kentucky, and Jackson, Tennessee, at a combined annual subsidy rate of $2,294,401 ($1,068,773 for Owensboro and $1,225,628 for Jackson), for a two-year period1 beginning when Pacific Wings inaugurates service.
  - Order 2011-12-15 (December 22, 2011): selecting SeaPort Airlines, Inc. to provide subsidized essential air service (EAS) at Jackson, Tennessee, for a one-year period. The one-year period will begin when SeaPort inaugurates full EAS and will run through the end of the 12th month thereafter. This selection of SeaPort will provide Jackson with 12 nonstop round trips per week to Nashville International Airport ("Nashville") and 6 nonstop round trips per week to Memphis International Airport ("Memphis") using 9-passenger Cessna Grand Caravan aircraft at an annual subsidy rate of $1,149,703.
  - Order 2014-4-26 (April 24, 2014): directing interested persons to show cause as to why the Department should not terminate the eligibility ... under the Essential Air Service (EAS) program based on criteria passed by Congress in the FAA Modernization and Reform Act of 2012 (Public Law No. 112-95). We find that Jackson is within 175 miles of a large or medium hub, Memphis International Airport (MEM), a medium hub, and, thus, is subject to the 10-enplanement statutory criterion. We also find that during fiscal year 2013, Jackson generated a total of 4,865 passengers (inbound plus outbound). Consistent with the methodology described above, that results in an average of 7.8 enplanements per day, below the 10-enplanement statutory criterion necessary to remain eligible in the EAS program.
