= AmericanConnection =

Regional airline of the United States (2001–2014)

IATA	ICAO	Call sign
AA	AAC	CONNECT AMERICA
- Commenced operations: December 2, 2001; 24 years ago
- Ceased operations: August 19, 2014; 11 years ago (merged into American Eagle)
- Hubs: Chicago–O'Hare; St. Louis (2001–2010)
- Frequent-flyer program: AAdvantage
- Alliance: Oneworld (affiliate; 2001–2014)
- Parent company: American Airlines Group

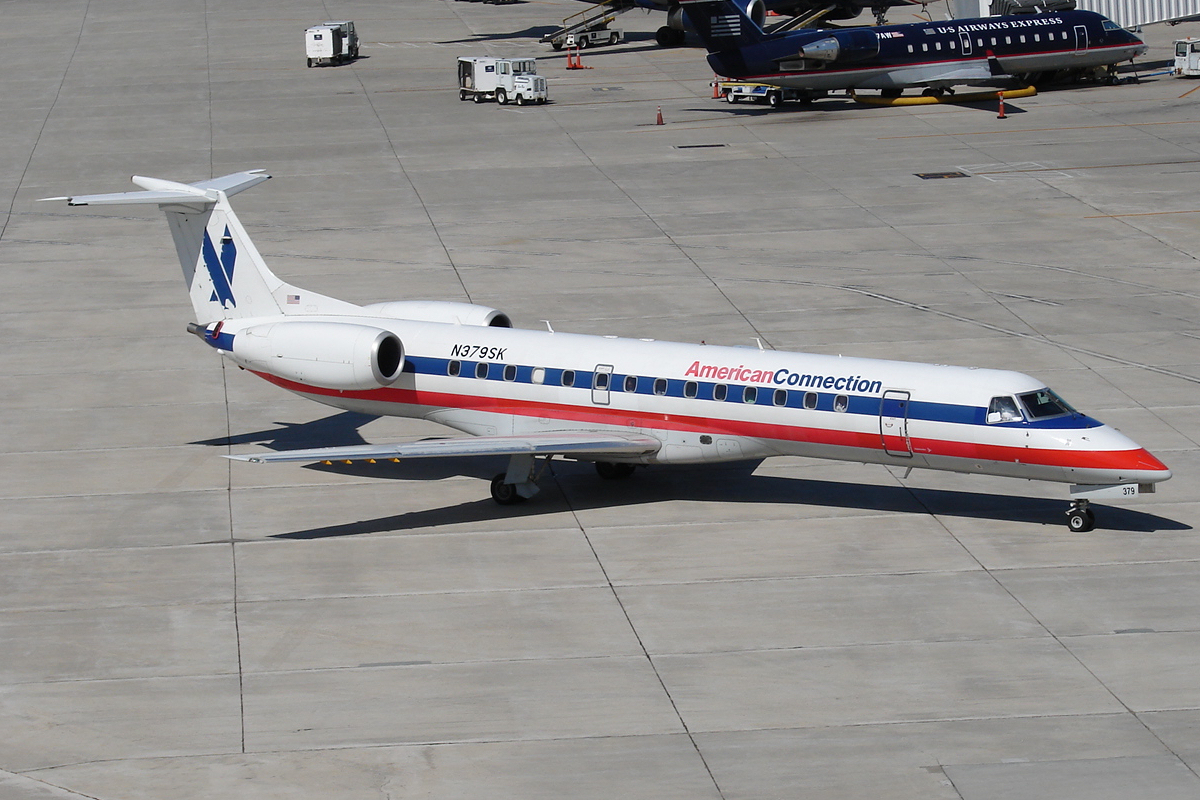
AmericanConnection ERJ 140 operated by Chautauqua Airlines

AmericanConnection was an American flight connection service brand name for the spoke-hub of U.S. mainline carrier American Airlines, under which regional airline operator Chautauqua Airlines operated feeder flights for American Airlines at its Chicago hub. American Airlines also uses affiliated companies (corporations under common ownership) operating under the American Eagle brand to provide regional service to its other hubs in addition to the AmericanConnection service that was operated by Chautauqua Airlines.

On April 6, 2010, American moved all existing AmericanConnection operations to Chicago–O'Hare as part of its restructuring plan, eliminating service by AmericanConnection at St. Louis.

At one time AmericanConnection operated over 180 flights a day to 21 destinations.

== History ==
Most of the AmericanConnection carriers previously operated under a marketing agreement with Trans World Airlines (TWA) as Trans World Express carriers and later as Trans World Connection during the merger transition between TWA and American.

RegionsAir operated as AmericanConnection until March 2007 and Trans States Airlines operated as AmericanConnection until May 2009.

Though not associated with TWA as many of former AmericanConnection airlines were, Business Express Airlines was yet another air carrier which flew under the AmericanConnection marketing banner. Prior to its acquisition by AMR Corporation and its integration into the American Eagle destinations route network, Business Express linked many smaller localities directly to American Airlines's expansive national and worldwide route network.

=== Discontinuation of the marketing brand ===
On November 29, 2011, AMR Corporation filed for Chapter 11 reorganization bankruptcy with $4 billion of cash.

On September 12, 2012 AMR Corporation, announced it was discontinuing the AmericanConnection marketing brand and reverting to using the sole marketing brand of American Eagle for its feeder services to small cities it contracts regional airlines to perform. However, in 2014 an announcement was made that Chautauqua, the last airline operating under the brand, would not seek renewal of its AmericanConnection contract and all flying would end by August 19, 2014.

AmericanConnection Flight 5329 from White Plains to Chicago–O'Hare was the final flight.

== Accidents and incidents ==
- Corporate Airlines Flight 5966 crashed on October 19, 2004, near Kirksville, Missouri, killing 13 people, with two survivors.

== See also ==
- List of defunct airlines of the United States
