= RegionsAir =

Airline in the United States

Corporate Express / Corporate Airlines / RegionsAir
IATA	ICAO	Call sign
3C	CEA	CORP-X
- Founded: 1996; 30 years ago
- Commenced operations: December 16, 1996; 29 years ago
- Ceased operations: May 25, 2007; 19 years ago
- Hubs: As AmericanConnection: Lambert-Saint Louis International Airport; As Continental Connection: Cleveland Hopkins International Airport; As Corporate Airlines: Nashville International Airport; As Midway Airlines: Raleigh Durham International Airport
- Frequent-flyer program: Aviators (TWA); AAdvantage (American); OnePass (Continental)
- Alliance: oneworld (American); SkyTeam (Continental)
- Fleet size: 12 BAe Jetstream Super 31's 4 SAAB 340A's
- Destinations: 13 from St. Louis (TWA/American); 3 from Cleveland (Continental); 12 from Raleigh/Durham (Midway)
- Parent company: RegionsAir
- Headquarters: Smyrna, Tennessee
- Key people: Charles Howell President/CEO (after shutdown)
- Website: Regionair.com

Logo used from 1996 to 1998

RegionsAir was a 14 CFR Part 121 regional airline based out of the Smyrna Airport in Smyrna, Tennessee, USA. The hub airports for RegionsAir were Lambert-St. Louis International Airport (STL) and Cleveland Hopkins International Airport (CLE).

RegionsAir operated under a code-sharing agreement with TWA and American Airlines to provide flights to communities as AmericanConnection from Lambert-St. Louis International Airport, and as Continental Connection from Cleveland Hopkins International Airport.

RegionsAir ceased all operations on March 8, 2007, and furloughed all of its employees a month later.

== History ==
RegionsAir was known as Corporate Express Airlines from 1996 to 1998, and then Corporate Airlines from 1998 to 2004. Operating as Corporate Express, it flew for Midway Airlines providing feed until their first shutdown in 2001 and also flew for TWA as Trans World Express out of St. Louis. When TWA merged into American Airlines on December 2, 2001, Corporate began operating as AmericanConnection continuing to provide flights to communities from Lambert-St. Louis International Airport. At that time, the airline was run by Chuck Howell, who became the president at Great Lakes Airlines. The airline changed its Corporate name to RegionsAir in May 2004 to end confusion with similarly named airlines. RegionsAir began another code-sharing alliance with Continental Airlines as Continental Connection in 2006 with a hub at Cleveland Hopkins International Airport. RegionsAir had been the air service provider for many small communities as part of the federally subsidized Essential Air Service (EAS) program.

On October 7, 2005, Viva International, an aviation holding company, issued an irrevocable Letter of Intent to Purchase RegionsAir for an undisclosed sum, but nothing ever became of the LOI.

In March, 2007 the Federal Aviation Administration (FAA) grounded the airline, saying there had been problems with the airline's training and certification program.

== Incidents and accidents ==
On October 19, 2004 Corporate Airlines Flight 5966 crashed on approach to Kirksville, Missouri. Thirteen people died and two were injured. The National Transportation Safety Board (NTSB) has determined pilot error to be the cause of this accident.

On March 2, 2007, the local Airline's FSDO office, FAA officials in DC, and the airline got into a disagreement over wording in the airline's training manuals. The airline voluntarily ceased scheduled operations until the items could be clarified. FAA officials found no discrepancies when they went over all pilots records. In the end, about 35 of the airline's flights were canceled that Saturday.

On March 8, 2007, at 4:36pm the FAA again grounded RegionsAir due to discrepancies in the airline's training procedures for line-check airmen. As a result of this second grounding within one week, several regional airports serviced by RegionsAir announced intentions to replace the airline with other regional carriers.

== See also ==
- Great Lakes Airlines replacement carrier for St. Louis hub
- List of defunct airlines of the United States
