= Silver Airways =

Former airline of the United States

Silver Airways, LLC

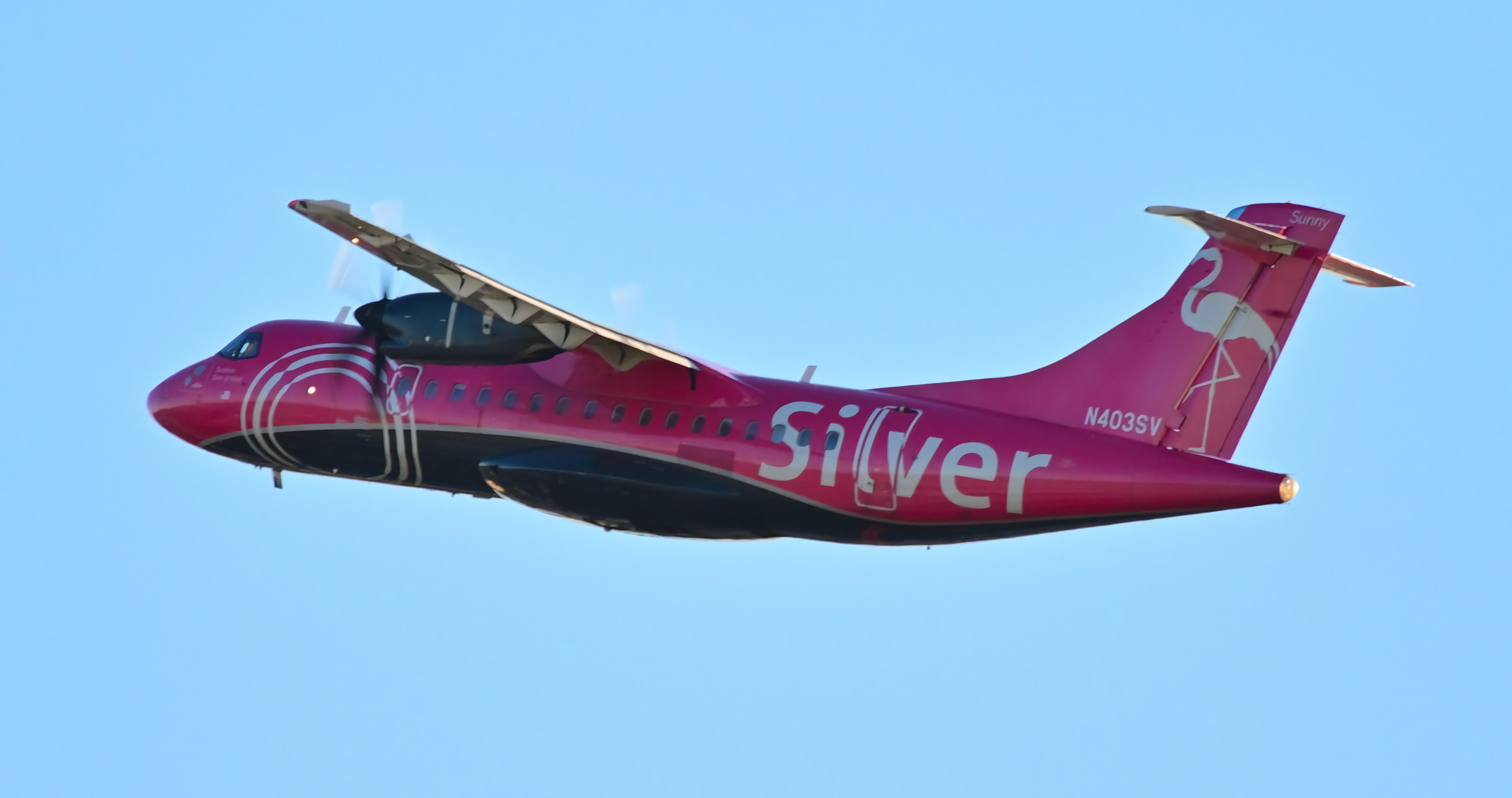
IATA	ICAO	Call sign
3M	SIL	SILVER WINGS
- Founded: May 21, 2011; 15 years ago
- Commenced operations: December 15, 2011; 14 years ago
- Ceased operations: June 11, 2025; 16 months ago
- AOC #: 29GA010N
- Hubs: Fort Lauderdale; San Juan; Tampa
- Subsidiaries: Seaborne Airlines
- Fleet size: 8
- Destinations: 16
- Parent company: Versa Capital Management, LLC
- Headquarters: Hollywood, Florida
- Key people: Steve Rossum (CEO)
- Employees: 700 (2024)
- Website: silverairways.com

Silver Airways was a regional airline in the United States with its headquarters in Hollywood, Florida, near Fort Lauderdale. It was founded in 2011 with assets from the former Gulfstream International Airlines, and last operated scheduled flights from its hubs in Fort Lauderdale and Tampa, Florida, as well as San Juan, Puerto Rico. The airline started flying on December 15, 2011.

As of November 2013, Silver Airways received $20,515,042 in annual federal subsidies for Essential Air Services that it provided to rural airports in the United States.

On June 11, 2025, Silver Airways ceased operations of all flights after selling its assets to Wexford Capital, who elected to discontinue operations of the airline.

== History ==
On November 4, 2010, Gulfstream International Airlines filed for Chapter 11 Bankruptcy protection. In May 2011, Victory Park Capital bought the assets of Gulfstream International Group, including 21 of Gulfstream's Beechcraft 1900D aircraft, from Raytheon Aircraft Credit Corporation. The company had been operating as Continental Connection on behalf of Continental Airlines.

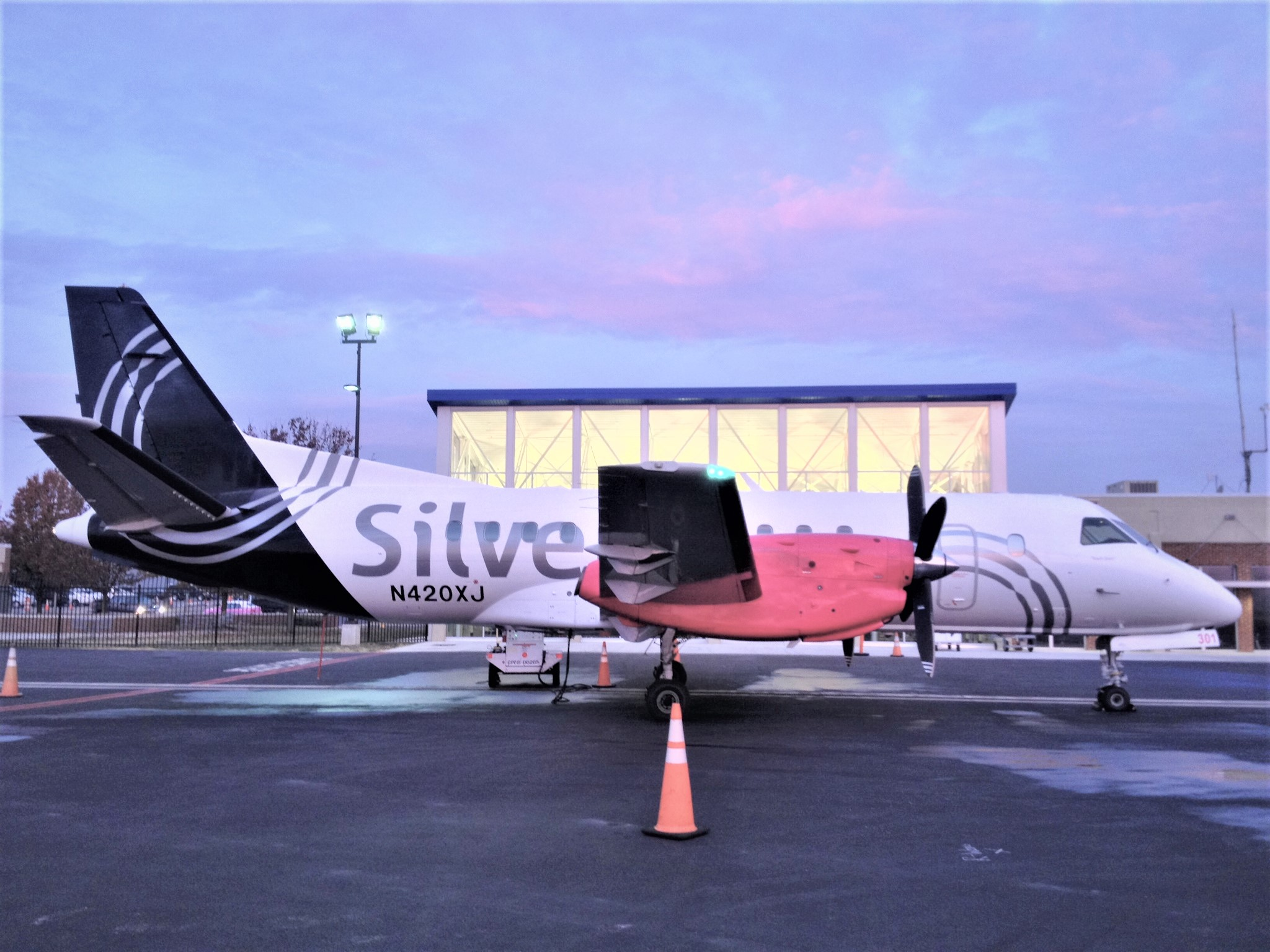
Saab 340 at Shenandoah Valley Regional Airport

On December 15, 2011, the airline was rebranded as Silver Airways. That same day, they took delivery of one of six recently purchased Saab 340 aircraft. Upon the merger of Continental Airlines into United Airlines on April 1, 2012, Silver operated as United Express until the affiliation with United ended in July 2013.

In the first half of 2012, Silver Airways made several moves to turn itself around. Its maintenance facilities were moved from Fort Lauderdale to Gainesville Regional Airport, taking over the former Eclipse Aviation facility that had remained vacant since 2009. It purchased six more Saab 340 aircraft bringing the Saab fleet to 12. Scheduled service on the Saabs started on the Florida and Bahamas routes. Shortly after, routes were added from Gainesville Regional Airport to Orlando International Airport and Tampa International Airport began.

Silver Airways expanded its network numerous times in the second half of 2012. First, Washington Dulles International Airport saw scheduled service to destinations in Pennsylvania, West Virginia, and Virginia. Silver's Florida route network expanded to Jacksonville. Service began from Hartsfield-Jackson Atlanta International Airport to destinations in Mississippi and Alabama. On August 7, 2012, Silver Airways made national news headlines when one of its flights landed at the wrong airport.

In late 2011, Silver Airways began a new operation in Montana, serving eight cities from a hub at Billings. Seven of the eight cities were served through government subsidies by way of Essential Air Service contracts. The Montana operation lasted for two years, ending by mid-2013.

On February 11, 2013, Victory Park Capital announced it had hired industry veteran Dave Pflieger to strengthen and grow the airline. On June 28, 2013, Silver Airways announced that it would cease Montana operations over the next few months. The announcement came on the heels of the Department of Transportation's (DOT) decision to eliminate subsidized service in two key Montana communities, Lewistown and Miles City. Service ended after the last flights on July 15, 2013, for Lewistown and Miles City. To ensure no interruption of service and a smooth transition for the flying public in the remaining Montana markets serviced by Silver Airways, Silver continued its operations in those communities until such time as the DOT awarded the routes to another airline and the new carrier started service to those communities.

In September 2013, Silver Airways announced an expansion of its intra-Florida and Florida–Bahamas network. In 2013, Silver Airways was named one of the Top 10 Best U.S. Airlines in the Condé Nast Traveler's 26th annual Readers' Choice Awards.

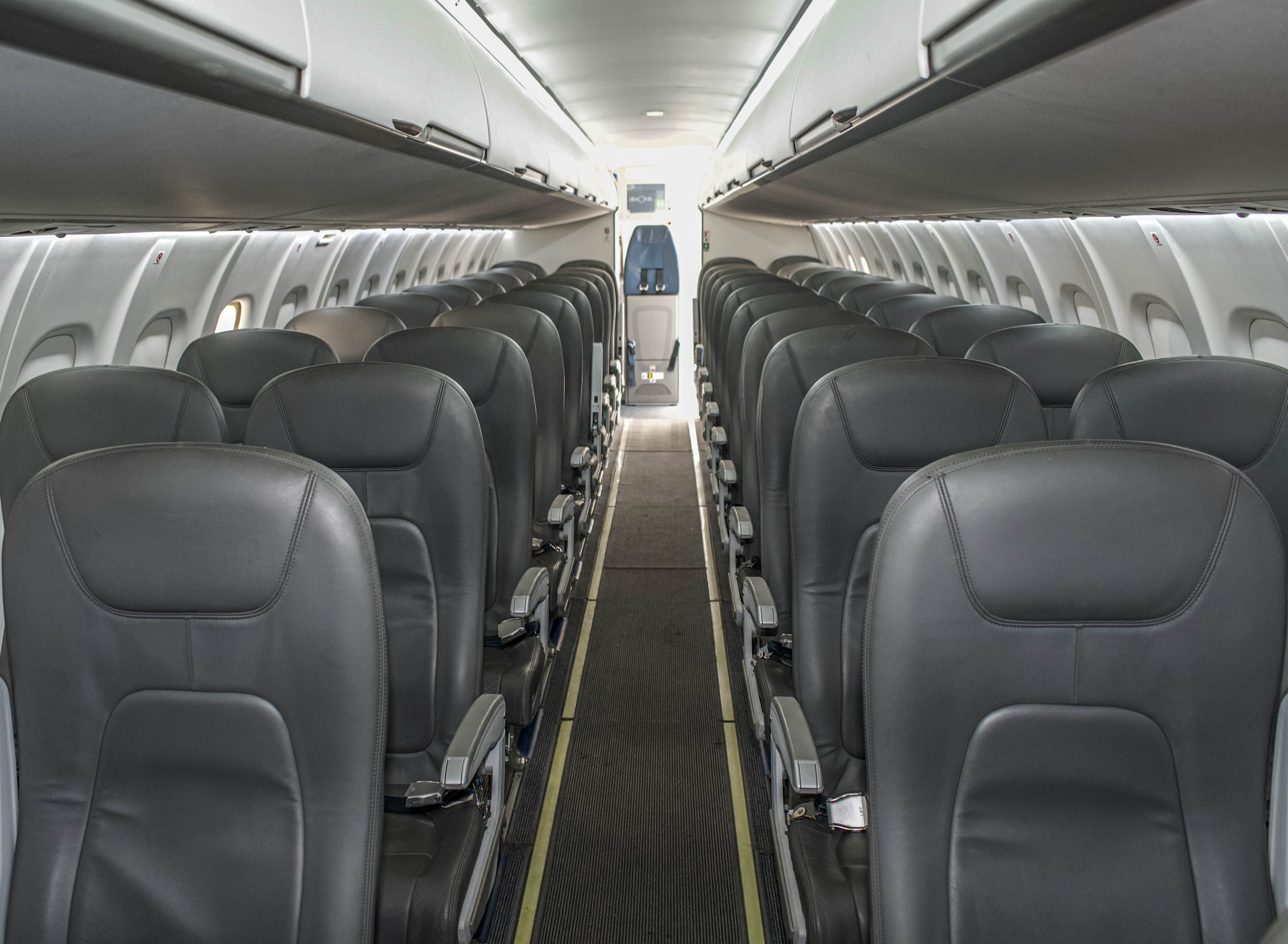
Interior cabin of the ATR 72-600

In the first half of 2014, Silver Airways made several network changes. It ended Beechcraft 1900 operations in Cleveland's EAS network. Then, Silver Airways closed much of its Atlanta network and redeployed its aircraft to other markets. In February 2014, the airline and its owners, Victory Park Capital, announced they had obtained up to $73 million in additional financing from GB Credit Partners, LLC, the investment management affiliate of Gordon Brothers Group and Crystal Financial LLC. Plans were also made to strengthen its core network and Saab 340B+ fleet. In March 2014, Silver Airways completed its first ever IATA Operational Safety Audit (IOSA).

In May 2014, Silver announced a new partnership with JetBlue. In May 2014, Silver Airways announced it was a new stand-alone airline after the launch of its own independent reservations system. CEO Dave Pflieger described the airline as a hybrid carrier, part start-up, part turnaround, both independent, and a partner to a larger airline (United). He also noted that it was "rationalizing" its fleet and network and "only flying where it makes sense," so the airline could not only meet but exceed guests' expectations and continue to grow the airline.

In January 2015, Silver Airways added Panama City, Florida, to its list of destinations by starting services to Orlando and Tampa from the Northwest Florida Beaches International Airport. It also announced the launch of a direct service between Jacksonville and Tampa.

On February 27, 2015, Silver Airways previewed its new maintenance headquarters at Orlando International Airport. The project was a complete renovation that is home to a 38,000 square foot (3,500 m^{2}) maintenance, repair and overhaul facility that includes two large aircraft hangars, each capable of housing three to four aircraft, as well as office space. Silver Airways committed to a long-term 30-year lease from the Greater Orlando Aviation Authority to headquarter its new maintenance facility in Orlando. In August 2015, Silver Airways ended its Gainesville service, several months after missing and restructuring payments on its Gainesville maintenance hangar.

On March 2, 2016, Silver Airways filed an application with the U.S. Department of Transportation to provide service from five Florida cities to ten Cuban cities. However, Silver Airways was only granted nine Cuban cities, being denied a Havana route.

On June 2, 2016, Silver Airways, Great Lakes Airlines and Frontier Airlines announced a partnership for recruiting pilots. On September 13, 2016, it was announced that a majority stake of Silver Airways had been acquired by a private equity firm Versa Capital Management LLC in Philadelphia. On August 1, 2017, Silver Airways announced an order for 20 ATR 42-600 aircraft, with options for up to 30 more.

On April 23, 2018, Silver Airways announced the acquisition of Seaborne Airlines, a San Juan–based airline serving the Caribbean. In November 2019, Silver Airways created a codeshare partnership with Delta Air Lines and American Airlines to provide single ticket booking with baggage transfers to destinations in the Caribbean.

In February 2020, Silver Airways announced new services to Charleston International Airport from its hubs in Fort Lauderdale, Orlando, and Tampa; however, due to the COVID-19 pandemic and its impacts on aviation, the services were initially postponed until November 2020, when service was finally started.

In March 2020, Silver announced the introduction of its own services to its San Juan base previously acquired along with its subsidiary Seaborne Airlines, with routes from San Juan launching in phases between March and July 2020 as more of the airline's ATR 42-600 aircraft would be delivered.

On November 9, 2021, Silver Airways began contract flying for Amazon Air with feeder flights from Albuquerque and Des Moines to Amazon's hub at the Fort Worth Alliance Airport near Fort Worth, Texas. Silver used two ATR 72-500 aircraft configured for airfreight operations and painted with Amazon's "Prime Air" logo. However, Amazon cut ties with Silver as of July 3, 2023, ending the airline's cargo services.

On December 30, 2024, Silver Airways filed for Chapter 11 bankruptcy protection. The company planned to continue operations throughout the procedure, and intended to exit bankruptcy by the first quarter of 2025.

On March 2, 2025, Silver Airways abruptly ceased flying out of Orlando. At least two aircraft, N408SV and N409SV, ferried from San Juan to Coeur D’Alene (COE). The routing brought them to South Carolina and Sioux Falls, starting on March 1. Additional fleet exits continued through April and into May. Aircraft have ferried to YQS, St. Thomas Airport in Ontario, Canada along with SGD, Sogdenberg, Denmark.

In April 2025, Silver Airways warned that its Chapter 11 case may end up converting to Chapter 7, which would result in liquidation.

On June 11, 2025, Silver Airways sold itself to Wexford Capital after no other participating bids came in to purchase its assets. However, Wexford was not interested in maintaining flight operations, forcing Silver to abruptly shut down that day. Silver Airways' last flight was Flight 56 from Tampa International Airport to Fort Lauderdale-Hollywood International Airport operated by N706SV, which arrived at 11:51 p.m. EDT on June 10, 2025. On July 29, 2025, Silver Airways converted its Chapter 11 case to a Chapter 7 bankruptcy liquidation.

== Facilities ==
The airline headquarters were located at 2850 Greene Street, Hollywood, FL 33020, in unincorporated Broward County, Florida, near Fort Lauderdale. Previously its headquarters were in Dania Beach, Florida, also near Fort Lauderdale. The airline also maintained a maintenance facility at Orlando International Airport in a facility previously utilized by Comair. In April 2023, the company faced eviction from Fort Lauderdale-Hollywood International Airport for failure to pay rent since 2021.

== Destinations ==
Over its history, Silver Airways domestically operated both scheduled commercial flights originating from its Fort Lauderdale, Orlando, and Tampa hubs in Florida, as well as Essential Air Services based in Atlanta (Georgia), Billings (Montana), Boston (Massachusetts), Cleveland (Ohio), and Washington, D.C. Internationally, the airline operated services between Florida and the Bahamas, and in March 2020 began its own operations based in San Juan (Puerto Rico) to surrounding destinations in the Caribbean, alongside those of its subsidiary Seaborne Airlines.

The following table lists destinations that were served by the airline prior to it ceasing operations on June 11, 2025:

Country (State) or Territory	City	Airport	Notes	Ref
Anguilla	The Valley	Clayton J. Lloyd International Airport	Terminated	
Antigua and Barbuda	Saint John's	V. C. Bird International Airport	Terminated	
Bahamas	Bimini	South Bimini Airport		
Bahamas	Cat Island	New Bight Airport	Terminated	
Bahamas	Freeport	Grand Bahama International Airport		
Bahamas	George Town	Exuma International Airport	Terminated	
Bahamas	Governor's Harbour	Governor's Harbour Airport		
Bahamas	Marsh Harbour	Marsh Harbour Airport		
Bahamas	Nassau	Lynden Pindling International Airport	Terminated	
Bahamas	North Eleuthera	North Eleuthera Airport		
Bahamas	Treasure Cay	Treasure Cay Airport	Terminated	
British Virgin Islands	Tortola	Terrance B. Lettsome International Airport		
Dominica	Portsmouth	Douglas–Charles Airport	Terminated	
Dominican Republic	La Romana	La Romana International Airport	Terminated	
Dominican Republic	Santiago de los Caballeros	Cibao International Airport	Terminated	
Dominican Republic	Puerto Plata	Gregorio Luperón International Airport	Terminated	
Puerto Rico	San Juan	Luis Muñoz Marín International Airport	Hub	
Saint Kitts and Nevis	Basseterre	Robert L. Bradshaw International Airport		
Saint Maarten	Philipsburg	Princess Juliana International Airport		
Turks and Caicos	Providenciales	Providenciales International Airport	Terminated	
United States (Alabama)	Birmingham	Birmingham–Shuttlesworth International Airport	Terminated	
United States (Alabama)	Huntsville	Huntsville International Airport	Terminated	
United States (Alabama)	Muscle Shoals	Northwest Alabama Regional Airport	Terminated	
United States (District of Columbia)	Washington, D.C.	Washington Dulles International Airport	Terminated	
United States (Florida)	Daytona Beach	Daytona Beach International Airport	Terminated	
United States (Florida)	Fort Lauderdale	Fort Lauderdale–Hollywood International Airport	Hub	
United States (Florida)	Fort Myers	Southwest Florida International Airport	Terminated	
United States (Florida)	Fort Walton Beach	Destin–Fort Walton Beach Airport	Terminated	
United States (Florida)	Gainesville	Gainesville Regional Airport	Terminated	
United States (Florida)	Jacksonville	Jacksonville International Airport	Terminated	
United States (Florida)	Key West	Key West International Airport		
United States (Florida)	Orlando	Orlando International Airport	Terminated	
United States (Florida)	Panama City	Northwest Florida Beaches International Airport	Terminated	
United States (Florida)	Pensacola	Pensacola International Airport		
United States (Florida)	Tallahassee	Tallahassee International Airport		
United States (Florida)	Tampa	Tampa International Airport	Hub	
United States (Florida)	West Palm Beach	Palm Beach International Airport	Terminated	
United States (Georgia)	Atlanta	Hartsfield–Jackson Atlanta International Airport	Terminated	
United States (Georgia)	Macon	Middle Georgia Regional Airport	Terminated	
United States (Georgia)	Savannah	Savannah/Hilton Head International Airport	Terminated	
United States (Louisiana)	New Orleans	Louis Armstrong New Orleans International Airport	Terminated	
United States (Maine)	Bar Harbor	Hancock County–Bar Harbor Airport	Terminated	
United States (Massachusetts)	Boston	Logan International Airport	Terminated	
United States (Mississippi)	Greenville	Mid Delta Regional Airport	Terminated	
United States (Mississippi)	Hattiesburg	Hattiesburg–Laurel Regional Airport	Terminated	
United States (Mississippi)	Meridian	Meridian Regional Airport	Terminated	
United States (Mississippi)	Tupelo	Tupelo Regional Airport	Terminated	
United States (Montana)	Billings	Billings Logan International Airport	Terminated	
United States (Montana)	Glasgow	Glasgow Valley County Airport	Terminated	
United States (Montana)	Glendive	Dawson Community Airport	Terminated	
United States (Montana)	Havre	Havre City–County Airport	Terminated	
United States (Montana)	Lewistown	Lewistown Municipal Airport	Terminated	
United States (Montana)	Miles City	Miles City Airport	Terminated	
United States (Montana)	Sidney	Sidney–Richland Municipal Airport	Terminated	
United States (Montana)	Wolf Point	L. M. Clayton Airport	Terminated	
United States (New York)	Jamestown	Chautauqua County-Jamestown Airport	Terminated	
United States (North Carolina)	Greensboro	Piedmont Triad International Airport	Terminated	
United States (Ohio)	Cleveland	Cleveland Hopkins International Airport	Terminated	
United States (Pennsylvania)	Altoona	Altoona–Blair County Airport	Terminated	
United States (Pennsylvania)	Bradford	Bradford Regional Airport	Terminated	
United States (Pennsylvania)	DuBois	DuBois Regional Airport	Terminated	
United States (Pennsylvania)	Franklin	Venango Regional Airport	Terminated	
United States (Pennsylvania)	Johnstown	Johnstown–Cambria County Airport	Terminated	
United States (South Carolina)	Charleston	Charleston International Airport	Terminated	
United States (South Carolina)	Columbia	Columbia Metropolitan Airport	Terminated	
United States (South Carolina)	Greenville–Spartanburg	Greenville–Spartanburg International Airport	Terminated	
United States (Tennessee)	Nashville	Nashville International Airport	Terminated	
United States (West Virginia)	Beckley	Raleigh County Memorial Airport	Terminated	
United States (West Virginia)	Lewisburg	Greenbrier Valley Airport	Terminated	
United States (West Virginia)	Morgantown	Morgantown Municipal Airport	Terminated	
United States (West Virginia)	Parkersburg	Mid-Ohio Valley Regional Airport	Terminated	
United States Virgin Islands	Saint Croix	Henry E. Rohlsen Airport		
United States Virgin Islands	Saint Thomas	Cyril E. King Airport		

== Interline and codeshare agreements ==
Silver Airways did not participate in any major global airline alliances, but the airline had interline and codeshare agreements with several airlines. Many of the following airlines are also members of global airline alliances:

- Avianca
- Air Canada
- Alaska Airlines
- American Airlines
- All Nippon Airways
- Azul Brazilian Airlines
- Bahamasair
- Copa Airlines
- Delta Air Lines
- Emirates
- JetBlue Airways
- United Airlines

== Fleet ==
As of June 2025, the final Silver Airways fleet consisted of the following aircraft at the time of ceasing operations:

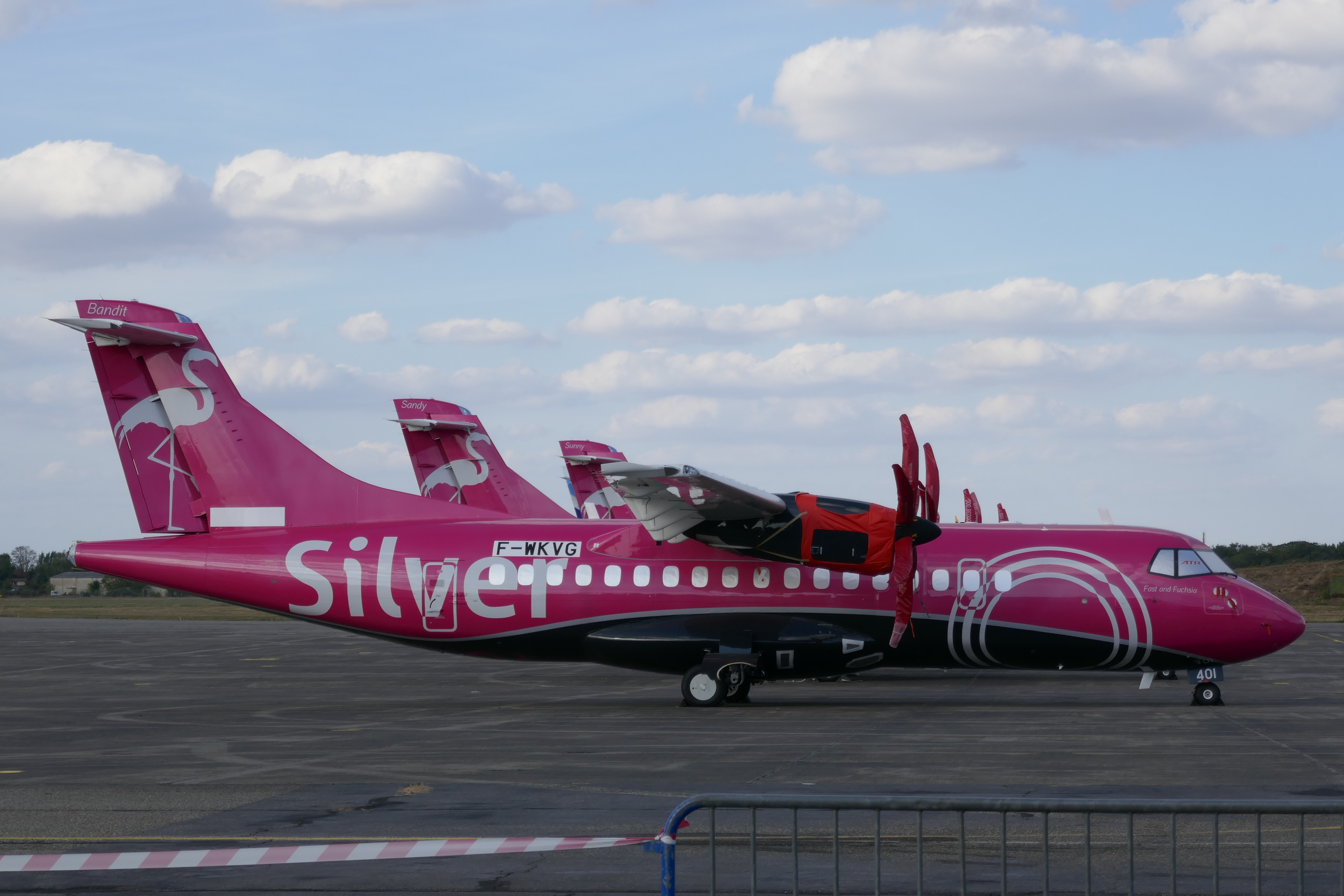
Silver Airways ATR 42-600

Aircraft	In service	Orders	Passengers	Notes
ATR 42-600	3	—	46	
ATR 72-600	5	—	70	
Total	8	—		

=== Historical fleet ===
Aircraft	Total	Introduced	Retired	Notes
Beechcraft 1900D	21	2011	2014	Inherited from Gulfstream International Airlines
Saab 340	28	2011	2022	Replaced by the ATR 42 & ATR 72
ATR 72-500F	5	2021	2023	Contract terminated by Amazon Air
