= GDV =

GDV may refer to:

- Dawson Community Airport in Glendive, Montana
- Gas Discharge Visualization
- Gastric dilatation volvulus
- Gudivada Junction railway station, in Andhra Pradesh, India
