= Big Sky Airlines =

Commuter airline of the United States (1978–2008)

IATA	ICAO	Call sign
GQ	BSY	BIG SKY
- Founded: September 15, 1978; 47 years ago
- Ceased operations: March 8, 2008; 18 years ago
- Hubs: Billings Logan International Airport
- Frequent-flyer program: MVP Club
- Fleet size: 10
- Destinations: 10
- Parent company: Big Sky Transportation-MAIR Holdings
- Headquarters: Billings, Montana, United States
- Key people: Fred de Leeuw (president)
- Website: web.archive.org/web/*/http://www.bigskyair.com/

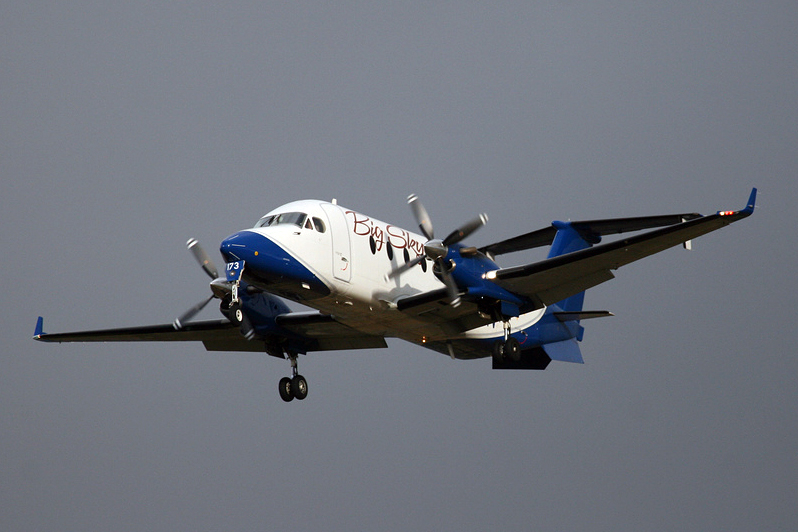
A Big Sky Beech 1900D

Big Sky Airlines was a commuter air carrier in the United States that operated from 1978 to 2008. Headquartered in Billings, Montana, United States. Big Sky was wholly owned by Big Sky Transportation Company, which in turn was a wholly owned subsidiary of MAIR Holdings.

Big Sky operated scheduled commuter passenger services to ten cities and maintained a hub at Billings Logan International Airport in Billings, Montana, from which the airline flew more of its nonstop routes than it did from any other airport. The airline was a crucial air link within the state of Montana, serving as the primary (and in some cases, only) commercial air carrier to several small airports in the state. The airline also began and ended service to a number of other locations over the years, often operating as a contract carrier under the federal government's Essential Air Service (EAS) program.

== History ==
The airline was established in 1978 and started operations on September 15, 1978, initially operating to a number of small cities in eastern and central Montana formerly served by the original Frontier Airlines. This remained the core of the company's business throughout its history, although the airline also expanded into a number of other geographic areas over the years. Most of the later expansions proved to be short-lived, however.

In 1987, Big Sky was operating code sharing service as Northwest Airlink on behalf of Northwest Airlines from a hub in Billings with British Aerospace BAe Jetstream 31 propjets. The Jetstream turboprops were then replaced with Swearingen Metroliner propjets on the Northwest Airlink service.

Big Sky took over Exec Express II d/b/a Lone Star Airlines/Aspen Mountain Air's EAS routes in October 1998, following the bankruptcy of this Texas-based commuter air carrier. Transfer of services was completed in December 1998. These routes included: Dallas/Ft. Worth-Brownwood, TX; Dallas/Ft. Worth-Enid/Ponca City, OK; Dallas/Ft. Worth-Hot Springs-Harrison-Mountain Home, AR-St. Louis, MO; and Dallas/Ft. Worth-El Dorado-Jonesboro, AR.

On October 21, 2000, Big Sky began new service between Montana and north Texas via southeastern New Mexico with a Dallas/Ft. Worth-Hobbs-Carlsbad-Roswell-Denver-Billings route. This service was later modified to Dallas/Ft. Worth-Carlsbad-Roswell and Dallas/Ft. Worth-Brownwood-Hobbs routes. All New Mexico service ended in 2001.

In late 2002, Big Sky Airlines was operating nonstop flights between Idaho Falls, Idaho and Denver, Colorado but then cancelled this service three months afterward, declaring it unprofitable.

In early 2005, Big Sky announced several changes concerning its service including the termination of flights to North Dakota as well as the replacement of its Fairchild Metroliner propjets with Beechcraft 1900D turboprops with the latter being leased from Mesa Air Group subsidiary Air Midwest. Service from Sheridan, Wyoming to both Denver and Billings began by the end of 2005 but was then terminated in January 2008.

In February 2006 Big Sky began daily service between Walla Walla Regional Airport and Boise (BOI). Service ceased with the airline's bankruptcy in 2007.

In July 2006, Big Sky announced that the airline would discontinue service to Great Falls, Montana; Kalispell, Montana; and Spokane, Washington. The airline also announced that one of their Beechcraft 1900D's would be leased to Chalk's International Airlines in Florida.

On September 1, 2006, Big Sky discontinued service to Moses Lake, Washington.

On December 21, 2006, a press release announced that Big Sky would become a Delta Connection carrier via a code share agreement with Delta Air Lines using eight Beechcraft 1900D turboprops operated from Boston's Logan International Airport (BOS). The airline's east coast operations ended on January 7, 2008.

=== Closure ===
On December 20, 2007, Big Sky announced that it would more than likely cease operations within 60 to 90 days. This was due to the loss of the Delta contract, unusually bad weather, disappointing revenue and record-high fuel prices. The remaining Beechcraft 1900D aircraft were planned to be auctioned off and proceeds returned to MAIR holdings stockholders.

In late 2007 Great Lakes Airlines was given USDOT approval to take over EAS service to and from Billings, Montana and seven other Montana cities currently served by Big Sky. Great Lakes Airlines began flying the routes in 2009, only to be replaced with Gulfstream International Airlines (now named Silver Airways) by the Montana Essential Air Service Task Force in January 2011. The Montana routes were replaced once again by Cape Air on December 10, 2013.

Big Sky's final scheduled flights arrived in Billings on the morning of March 8, 2008; that morning, the three final flights marked the end of the airline by performing a joint flyover of the Billings airport prior to landing.

The airline's website, www.bigskyair.com, has been deactivated.

== Destinations: Western and Central U.S. ==
Big Sky served the following destinations at different times during its existence. Destination information is taken from various Big Sky Airlines route maps:

Arkansas

- El Dorado
- Harrison
- Hot Springs
- Jonesboro
- Mountain Home

Colorado

- Denver (Denver International Airport)

Idaho

- Boise Airport
- Idaho Falls
- Lewiston

Illinois

- Springfield
- Chicago Midway

Minnesota

- Minneapolis–Saint Paul International Airport

Missouri

- St. Louis Lambert International Airport

Montana

- Billings Logan International Airport – Hub
- Bozeman Yellowstone International Airport
- Butte (Bert Mooney Airport)
- Glasgow Airport
- Glendive (Dawson Community Airport)
- Great Falls International Airport
- Havre City–County Airport
- Helena Regional Airport
- Kalispell (Glacier Park International Airport)
- Lewistown Municipal Airport
- Miles City Airport
- Missoula International Airport
- Sidney (Richland Municipal Airport)
- Wolf Point (L. M. Clayton Airport)

New Mexico

- Carlsbad
- Hobbs
- Roswell International Air Center

North Dakota

- Bismarck
- Devils Lake
- Dickinson
- Grand Forks
- Jamestown
- Williston

Oklahoma

- Enid
- Ponca City

Oregon

- Portland International Airport

South Dakota

- Rapid City

Texas

- Brownwood
- Dallas/Fort Worth International Airport – Hub

Washington

- Moses Lake (Grant County International Airport)
- Seattle–Tacoma International Airport
- Spokane International Airport
- Walla Walla
- Olympia Regional Airport

Wisconsin

- Eau Claire

Wyoming

- Casper
- Gillette
- Sheridan County Airport

== Delta Connection Routes: Eastern U.S. and Canada ==
Maine

- Bangor, Maine

Massachusetts

- Boston, Massachusetts – Hub

New Brunswick

- Fredericton, New Brunswick, Canada

New Jersey

- Trenton, New Jersey

New York

- Albany, New York
- Long Island/Islip, New York
- Massena, New York
- Ogdensburg, New York
- Plattsburgh, New York
- Saranac Lake, New York
- Watertown, New York

Ohio

- Cincinnati, Ohio – Hub

Pennsylvania

- Allentown/Bethlehem/Easton, Pennsylvania

Quebec

- Quebec, Quebec, Canada

Vermont

- Burlington, Vermont

== Fleet ==
In January 2000, the Big Sky Airlines fleet consisted of 14 Fairchild Swearingen Metroliner Metro III and Metro 23 aircraft.

However, the air carrier then removed the Metro propjets from its fleet and in January 2008 was operating Beechcraft 1900D turboprops with 10 aircraft in the fleet:

Big Sky Airlines fleet
Aircraft	Total	Passengers (Economy)	Routes	Notes
Beechcraft 1900D	10	19	All	Several aircraft providing Delta Connection service

Big Sky previously operated Handley Page Jetstream propjets as well as Cessna prop aircraft during the late 1970s. By 1987, the airline was operating British Aerospace BAe Jetstream 31 propjets on its flights as a Northwest Airlink air carrier.

== Codeshare agreements ==
Big Sky had codeshare agreements with the following airlines. The code share agreements allowed these larger mainline air carriers to place their airline codes on Big Sky flights, but not vice versa.

- Alaska Airlines
- America West Airlines
- Delta Air Lines (as Delta Connection)
- Northwest Airlines (as Northwest Airlink)
