= KCTB =

KCTB may refer to:

- KCTB-LP, a low-power radio station (94.1 FM) licensed to Lonepine, Montana, United States
- the ICAO code for Cut Bank Municipal Airport in the U.S. state of Montana
