= Northwest Airlines Flight 1 =

1939 aviation accident

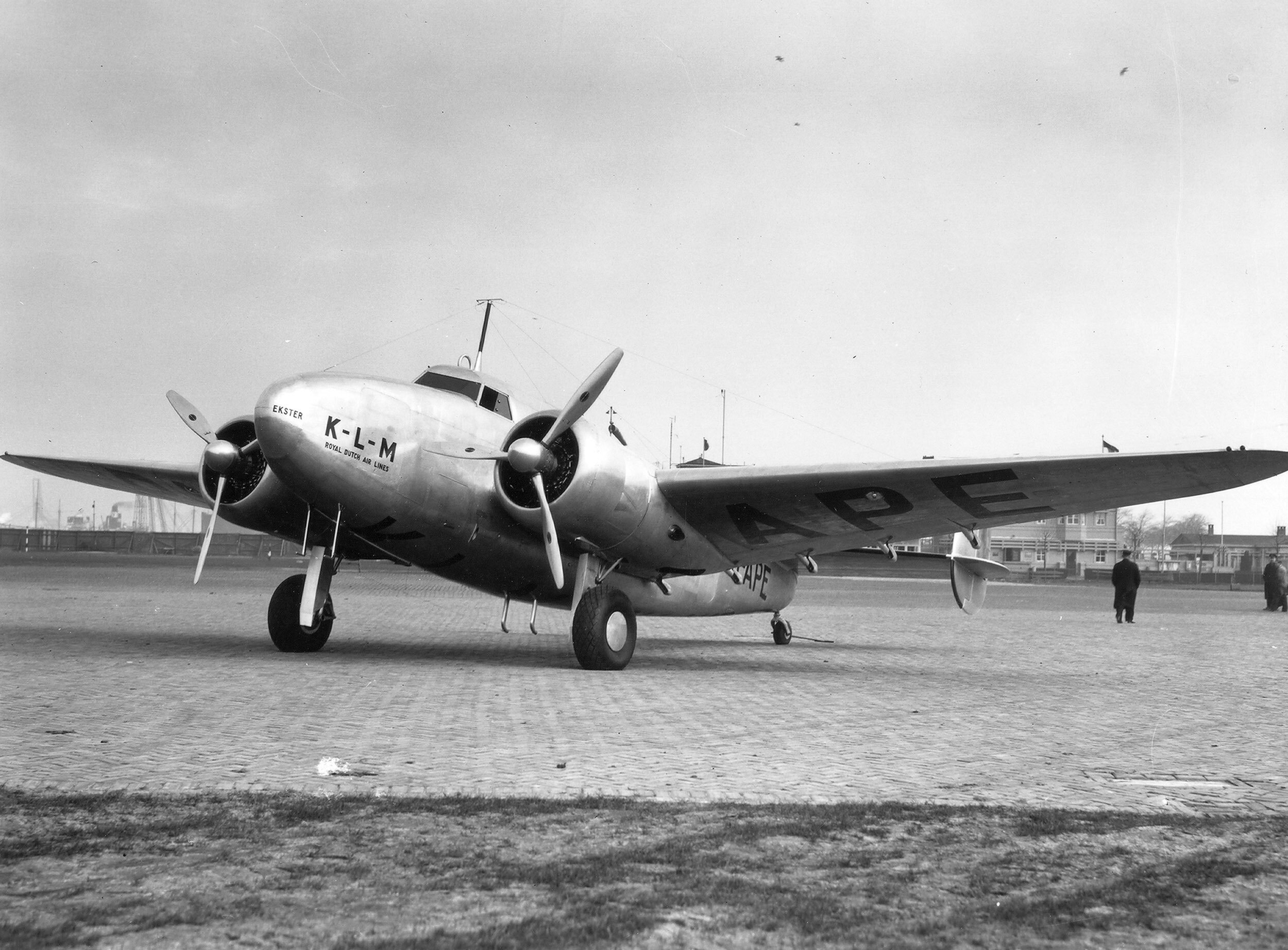
- A Super Electra similar to the aircraft

Accident
- Date: January 13, 1939
- Summary: In-flight fire
- Site: Custer County, Montana, U.S. near Miles City; 46°25′41″N 105°53′10″W

Aircraft
- Aircraft type: Lockheed 14H Super Electra
- Operator: Northwest Airlines
- Registration: NC17389
- Flight origin: Minneapolis-Wold-Chamberlain Field (MSP/KMSP), Minnesota
- 1st stopover: Fargo-Hector Field (FAR/KFAR), North Dakota
- 2nd stopover: Bismarck Municipal Airport (BIS/KBIS), North Dakota
- 3rd stopover: Miles City Airport (MLS/KMLS), Montana
- 4th stopover: Billings Municipal Airport (BIL/KBIL), Montana
- 5th stopover: Butte Airport (BTM/KBTM), Montana
- Last stopover: Felts Field (SFF/KSFF), Spokane, Washington
- Destination: Boeing Field (BFI/KBFI) Seattle, Washington
- Passengers: 2
- Crew: 2
- Fatalities: 4
- Survivors: 0

Northwest Airlines Flight 1, registration NC17389, was a Lockheed Model 14 Super Electra aircraft which crashed in eastern Montana on Friday, January 13, 1939, approximately 0.5 miles (0.80 km) southwest of the Miles City Airport. All four on board were killed in the accident.

== Flight ==
Flight 1 normally originated from Chicago to Seattle, with intermediate stops in Minneapolis; Fargo, North Dakota; Bismarck, North Dakota; Miles City, Montana; Billings, Montana; Butte, Montana; and Spokane, Washington. On the date of the accident, the flight actually began in Minneapolis and departed at 4:00 PM CST. After the two stops in North Dakota, the flight reached Miles City at 7:41 PM MST to refuel and take on cargo.

== Accident ==
Departure from Miles City was delayed for over an hour due to weather conditions at Billings, but the aircraft eventually departed at 9:14 PM, with only two passengers on board.

Shortly after takeoff to the northwest (current runway 31), and at an altitude of five hundred feet (150 m) above ground level (AGL), the aircraft began a short turn to the left, lost altitude rapidly, and descended almost to the ground. It then pulled up into a sharp climb, reached about 500 feet AGL again, turned left again and descended rapidly into a ravine approximately half-mile southwest of the field.

== Investigation ==
Investigators with the Department of Commerce's Civil Aeronautics Authority (CAA), a predecessor organization to the Federal Aviation Administration (FAA) and National Transportation Safety Board (NTSB), determined that an intense fire had developed in the cockpit shortly after the aircraft had departed the airport.

Although the state of the wreckage prevented investigators from definitively pinpointing the exact origin of the fire, an area of severe burning was found close to the cross-feed fuel valve located in the cockpit between the pilot and co-pilot. The Super Electra's cross-feed fuel system maintained a constant pressure of approximately 4.5 pounds per square inch (31 kPa), and there had been numerous reports of leakage in the vicinity of the valve. Lockheed designers had not provided any method by which any fuel that did leak from the valve could safely be drained. It was also difficult to maintain or inspect the valve due to its location.

== Recommendation ==
The CAA recommended that the cross-feed fuel system be relocated to allow for easier maintenance and inspection and to reduce the possibility of a cockpit fire caused by fuel leakage. They also recommended that areas of leakage in the fuel line be modified so as to allow for adequate drainage.

== Aftermath ==
This accident occurred one year and three days after Northwest's Flight 2 crashed, also in Montana, in the Bridger Mountains northeast of Bozeman. These accidents, as well as two others which befell Northwest Super Electras in 1938, called into question the airworthiness and commercial potential of the model. Northwest sold off its fleet of Electras soon after this accident.

This flight number was used for many years on the trans-Pacific Los Angeles–Tokyo–Ho Chi Minh City route. Northwest was acquired by Delta Air Lines in 2008, and a merger between the two airlines was finalized in 2010; the combined company retired the Northwest name and kept the Delta one.

== See also ==
- Aviation safety
- List of accidents and incidents involving commercial aircraft
