= KSDY =

KSDY may refer to:

- Sidney–Richland Municipal Airport, Montana, U.S., ICAO code KSDY
- KSDY-LD, a television station in California, U.S.
