= Montana World War II Army Airfields =

U.S. Air Force facilities created for World War II

Montana World War II Army Airfields
- Part of World War II

Site information
- Type: Army airfields

Location
- Map of Montana World War II Army Airfields

Site history
- Built: 1940-1944
- In use: 1940–present

During World War II, the United States Army Air Forces (USAAF) established numerous airfields in Montana for training pilots and aircrews of USAAF fighters and bombers.

Most of these airfields were under the command of Second Air Force or the Army Air Forces Training Command (AAFTC) (a predecessor of the current-day United States Air Force Air Education and Training Command). However, the other USAAF support commands (Air Technical Service Command (ATSC); Air Transport Command (ATC) or Troop Carrier Command) commanded a significant number of airfields in support roles.

It is still possible to find remnants of these wartime airfields. Many were converted into municipal airports, returned to agriculture, or retained as United States Air Force installations that served as front-line bases during the Cold War. Hundreds of the temporary buildings that were used survive today, and are being used for other purposes.

== Major airfields ==
Second Air Force

- Cut Bank Army Airfield, Cut Bank

II Fighter Command
Now: Cut Bank Municipal Airport (IATA: CTB, ICAO: KCTB)

- Glasgow Army Airfield, Glasgow

II Fighter Command
Now: Glasgow International Airport (IATA: GGW, ICAO: KGGW)

Note: Glasgow Air Force Base (1957-1976) is NOT the World War II Airfield.

- Great Falls Army Airfield, Great Falls

352d Army Air Force Base Unit
Was: Great Falls Air Force Base (1947-1955)
Now: Malmstrom Air Force Base (1955–present; runway inactive since 1997, limited to rotary-wing ops)

- Lewistown Army Airfield, Lewistown

II Bomber Command
Now: Lewistown Municipal Airport (IATA: LWT, ICAO: KLWT)

Air Transport Command

- Gore Army Airfield, Great Falls

Joint use USAAF/Civil Airport
7th Ferrying Group
385th Army Air Force Base Unit
Now: Great Falls International Airport (IATA: GTF, ICAO: KGTF)
And: Great Falls Air National Guard Base

- Helena Army Airfield, Helena

Joint use USAAF/Civil Airport
Now: Helena Regional Airport (IATA: HLN, ICAO: KHLN)
