= Glasgow Valley County Airport =

Airport in Montana, United States

Glasgow Valley County Airport Wokal Field

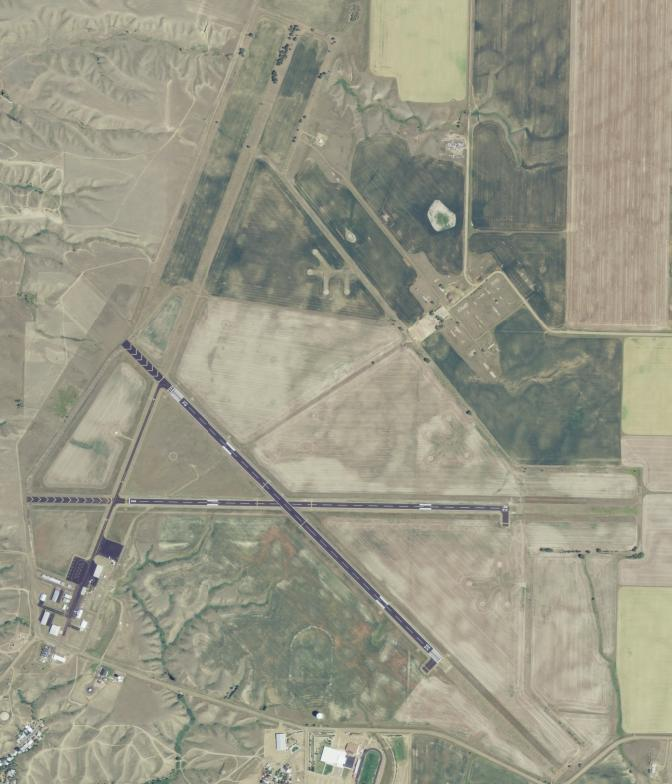
- USGS 2006 orthophoto
- IATA: GGW; ICAO: KGGW; FAA LID: GGW

Summary
- Airport type: Public
- Owner/Operator: City of Glasgow & Valley County
- Serves: Glasgow, Montana
- Elevation AMSL: 2,296 ft (700 m)
- Coordinates: 48°12′45″N 106°36′53″W
- Website: www.valleycountymtairport.com

Map
- Location within Montana Location within the United States

Runways
Direction	Length		Surface
Direction	ft	m	Surface
12/30	5,002	1,525	Asphalt
8/26	5,000	1,524	Asphalt

Statistics
- Aircraft operations (year ending 5/15/2023): 8,230
- Based aircraft (2023): 51
- Source: Federal Aviation Administration

Glasgow Valley County Airport (Wokal Field) IATA: GGW, ICAO: KGGW, FAA LID: GGW) is a public airport a mile northeast of Glasgow, in Valley County, Montana, United States. It is served by one airline, subsidized by the Essential Air Service program.

The Federal Aviation Administration says this airport had 4201 passenger boardings (enplanements) in calendar year 2018, up 19.45% from 3517 enplanements in 2017. The Federal Aviation Administration (FAA) National Plan of Integrated Airport Systems for 2017–2021 categorized it as a local general aviation facility.

Scheduled air service temporarily ceased on March 8, 2008, when Big Sky Airlines ended operations in bankruptcy. Great Lakes Airlines was given USDOT approval to take over Essential Air Service (EAS) and flights began in 2009. Service is currently provided under EAS contract by Cape Air.

== History ==
Glasgow Army Air Field, also known as the Glasgow Satellite Airfield, was activated on November 10, 1942. It was one of three satellite fields of Great Falls Army Air Base which accommodated a bombardment group. There were four Bomber Squadrons within this group, one located at the Great Falls Army Air Base and one at each of the three satellite air fields at Lewistown, Glasgow and Cut Bank.

The 96th Bombardment Squadron of the Second Bombardment Group arrived at Glasgow Army Air Field on November 29, 1942. Heavy bomber squadrons of the time usually consisted of 8 B-17s with 37 officers and 229 enlisted men. The satellite field was used by B-17 bomber crews from the Second Air Force during the second phase of their training. Actual bombing and gunnery training was conducted at the airfield's associated sites, Glasgow Pattern Bombing Range and the Glasgow Pattern Gunnery Range, though other training sites within the bombardment group were probably also used. The target-towing aircraft assigned to the Fort Peck Aerial Gunnery Range were also stationed at Glasgow. The last unit to complete training at Glasgow Satellite Field was the 614th Bombardment Squadron of the 401st Bombardment Group, which left for England in October 1943.

On December 1, 1944 a German prisoner-of-war camp was established at the site. On July 15, 1946 the Glasgow Army Air Field was classified surplus and it was transferred to the War Assets Administration on November 18, 1946.

The first airline flights were Frontier DC-3s in 1959; Frontier pulled out in 1980.

== Facilities ==
The airport covers 1,552 acres (628 ha) at an elevation of 2,296 feet (700 m). It has two asphalt runways: 12/30 is 5,002 by 100 feet (1,525 x 30 m) and 8/26 is 5,000 by 75 feet (1,524 x 23 m).

In the year ending May 15, 2023, the airport had 8,230 aircraft operations, average 23 per day: 4,750 general aviation, 3,460 air taxi, and 20 military. In May 2023, 51 aircraft were based at the airport: 48 single-engine, 2 multi-engine, and 1 helicopter.

== Airline and destination ==
The airport has one passenger airline:

Airlines	Destinations
Cape Air	Billings

=== Statistics ===
Carrier shares (November 2021 - October 2022)
Carrier	Passengers (arriving and departing)
Cape Air	6,250(100%)

Top domestic destinations (November 2021 - October 2022)
Rank	Airport	Passengers	Airline
1	Billings, Montana	2,000	Cape Air
2	Wolf Point, Montana	1,000	Cape Air

== See also ==
- Montana World War II Army Airfields
- List of airports in Montana
