= Billings Logan International Airport =

Public airport in Billings, Montana, United States

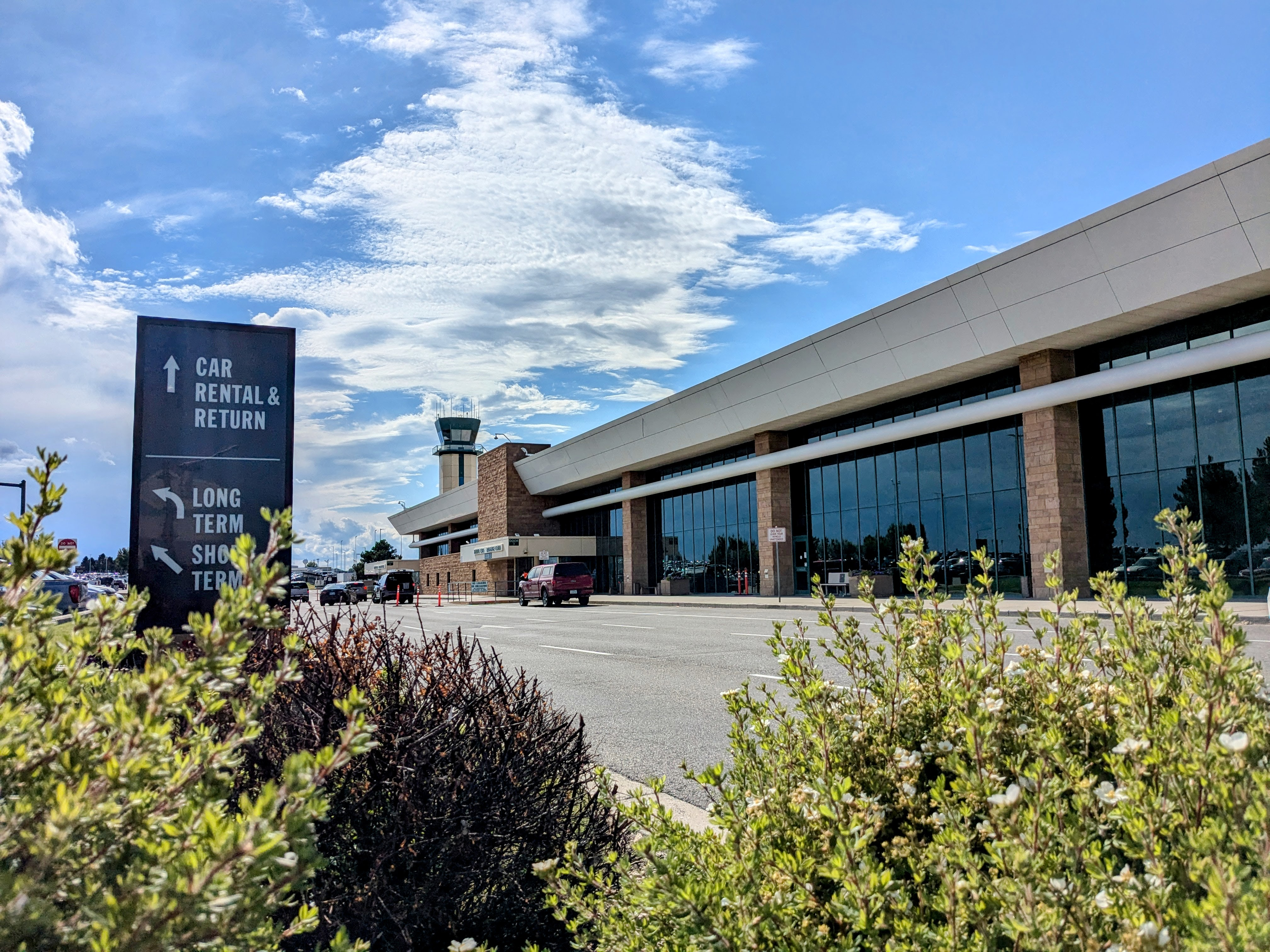
- Billings Logan International Airport terminal
- IATA: BIL; ICAO: KBIL; FAA LID: BIL

Summary
- Airport type: Public
- Owner: City of Billings
- Operator: Billings Department of Aviation & Transit
- Serves: Billings, Montana, United States
- Opened: May 29, 1928; 98 years ago
- Hub for: Alpine Air Cargo; Corporate Air Cargo; Mountain Air Cargo
- Operating base for: Cape Air
- Time zone: Mountain Standard Time (UTC−07:00)
  - Summer (DST): Mountain Daylight Time (UTC−06:00)
- Elevation AMSL: 3,662 ft (1,116 m)
- Coordinates: 45°48′28″N 108°32′34″W
- Website: www.flybillings.com

Maps
- FAA airport diagram of BIL
- Location within Montana
- Interactive map of Billings Logan International Airport

Runways
Direction	Length		Surface
Direction	ft	m	Surface
07/25	5,501	1,677	Asphalt
10L/28R	10,518	3,206	Asphalt
10R/28L	3,800	1,158	Asphalt

Statistics (2025)
- Passengers: 1,026,611 ▲4.68%
- Total cargo (freight+mail)(lbs.): 73,484,519
- Sources: FAA flybillings.com

Billings Logan International Airport (IATA: BIL, ICAO: KBIL, FAA LID: BIL) is in the western United States, two miles (three kilometers) northwest of downtown Billings, in Yellowstone County, Montana. It is the fourth busiest airport in Montana, having been surpassed in recent years by Bozeman, Missoula, and Flathead County (Kalispell) in number of annual enplanements. Owned by the city of Billings, the airport is on top of the Rims, a 500-foot (150 m) cliff overlooking the downtown core, and covers 2,500 acres (1,000 hectares) of land.

The National Plan of Integrated Airport Systems for 2011–2015 categorized it as a primary commercial service airport (more than 10,000 enplanements per year). According to Federal Aviation Administration records, the airport had 387,368 passenger boardings (enplanements) in 2013, 388,329 in 2010 and 397,073 in 2009.

Billings Logan International Airport has scheduled nonstop flights to several airline hubs such as Dallas/Fort Worth, Denver, Minneapolis/St. Paul, Portland, Salt Lake City, Phoenix, Chicago, and Seattle. Billings also serves as a small hub for Cape Air, a commuter airline which operates nonstop flights with Tecnam P2012 prop aircraft within Montana to Glasgow, Glendive, Havre, Sidney, and Wolf Point.

The airport has two fixed-base operators, Beacon Air Group and Edwards Jet Center, which offer fuel as well as maintenance, charter, crew lounge, and snooze rooms.

== History ==
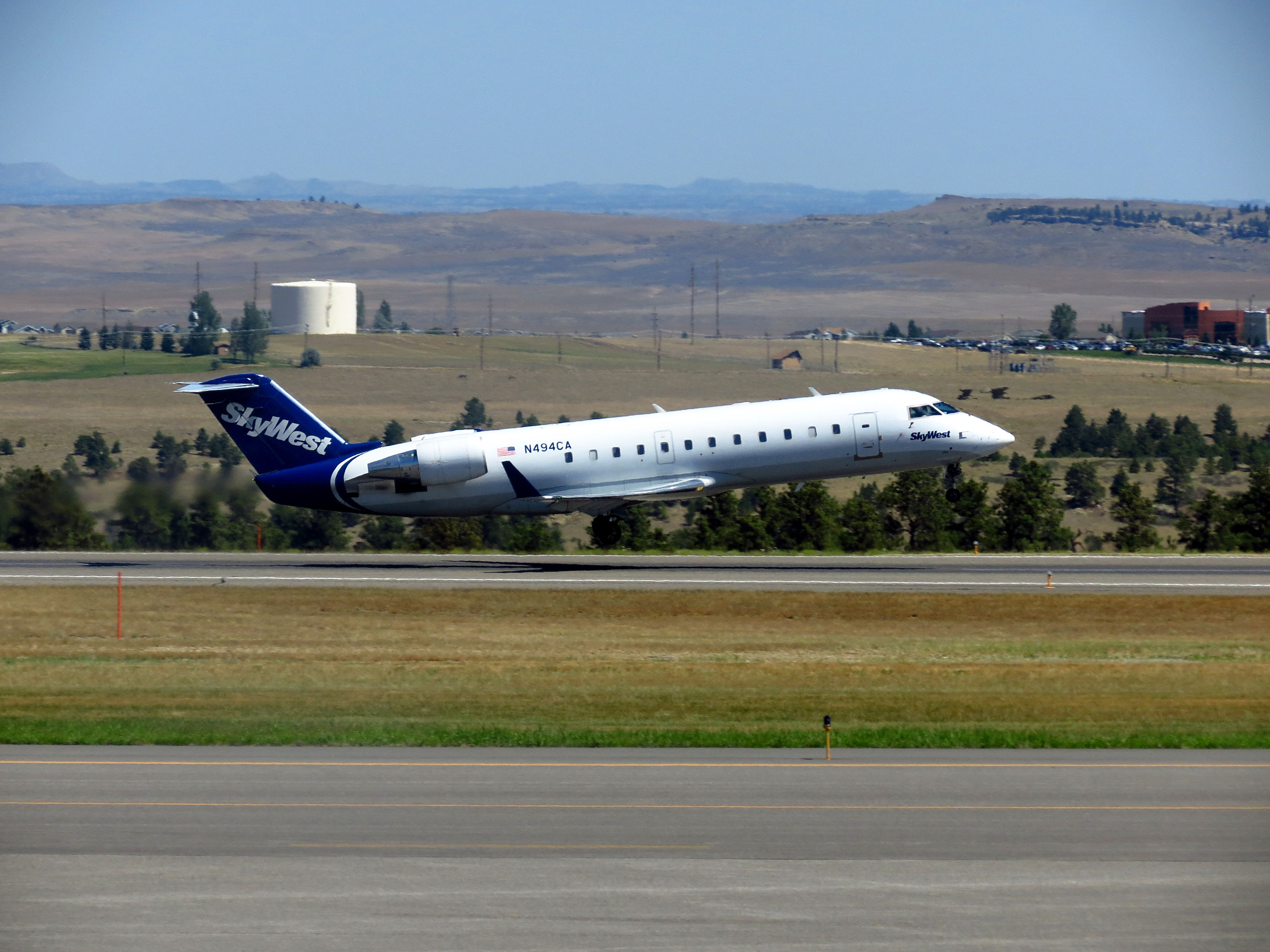
A SkyWest CRJ 200

The first recorded flight in Billings was in 1913 by a local dentist named Dr. Frank Bell, using his home-made Curtiss 0-X-5, on Memorial Day 1913. With much publicity. Dr. Bell took off from Billings flying west-southwest to Park City and back, a 40-mile (65 km) round trip. This flight was captured by local artist J.K. Ralston in his painting entitled First Flight, displayed in the airport lobby.

In 1927, the City of Billings approved $5,000 and 400 acres (160 hectares) on top of the Rims to build a runway. The 1,820-foot (550 m) runway and small administrative building was built by horse-drawn equipment; the airport opened on May 29, 1928.

In 1933, Northwest Airlines introduced the first scheduled passenger air service. Northwest was serving Billings in 1935 as a stop on a route between Chicago and Seattle flown with Lockheed Model 10 Electra twin prop airliners. During the 1950s and early 1960s, Northwest operated Douglas DC-3, Douglas DC-4, Douglas DC-6B and Douglas DC-7C propeller aircraft into Billings.

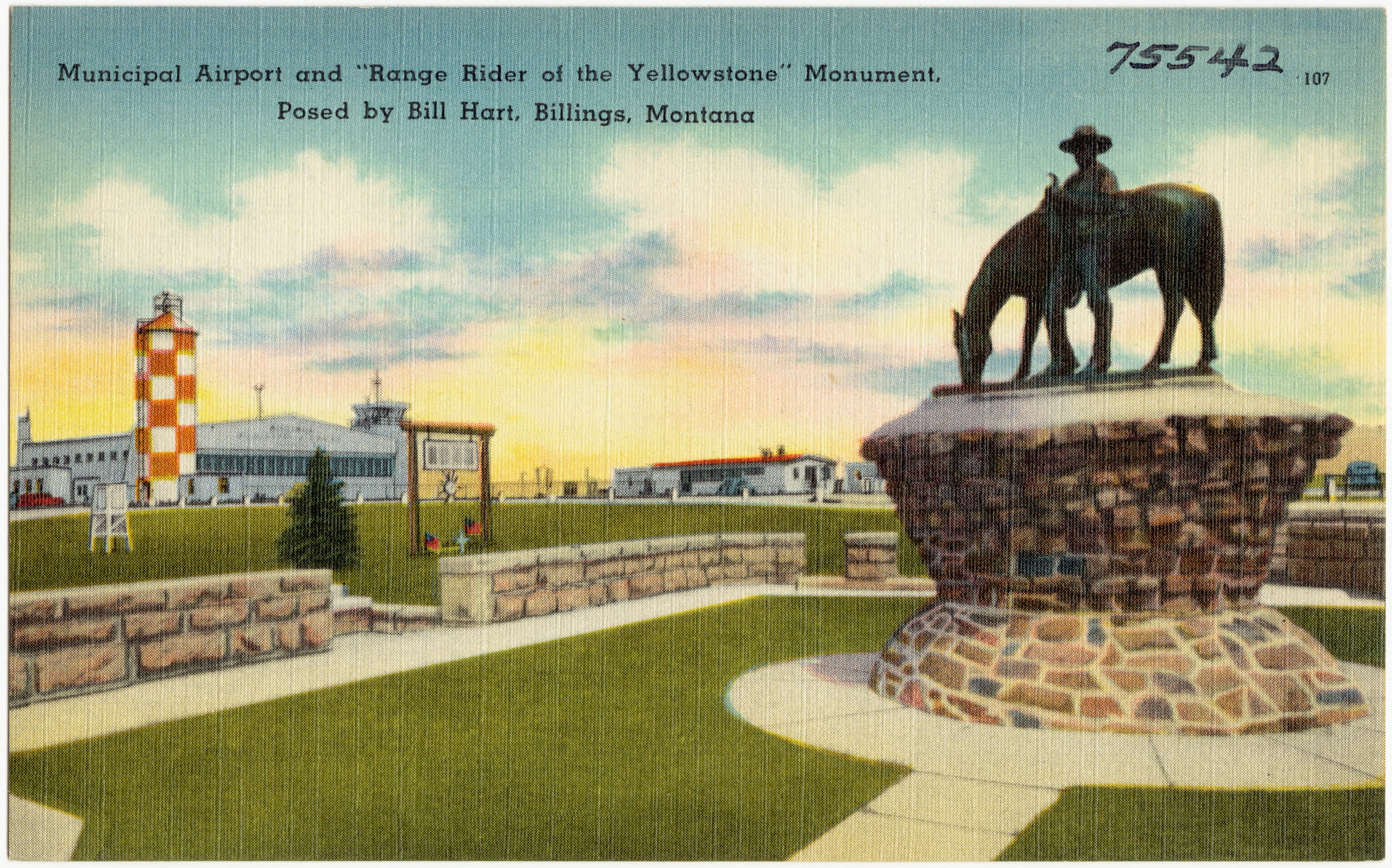
Postcard of the airport circa 1940

Inland Air Lines was serving the airport in 1939 as a stop on a route between Denver and Great Falls. Western Airlines then acquired Inland Air Lines and in 1944 was serving Billings with Douglas DC-3 and Lockheed Model 18 Lodestar twin prop aircraft on the route between Denver and Great Falls. Western operated Convair 240 and Douglas DC-6B propeller aircraft into the airport during the 1950s and early 1960s.

The original Frontier Airlines was serving Billings in 1950 with Douglas DC-3 aircraft operated on routes to Denver and Salt Lake City. By 1962, Frontier had introduced Convair 340 aircraft on its flights into the airport and would later serve Billings with Boeing 737-200 jets as well as with Convair 580 and de Havilland Canada DHC-6 Twin Otter turboprops.

Improvements over the years include runway lights in 1935 to the new 120-foot (37 m) air traffic control tower in 2005. Major terminal expansions were made in 1958, 1972, and 1992. In early 2006 the airport added electronic monitors giving info on arrivals and departures.

The name changed from the Billings Municipal Airport to Billings Logan Field in 1957, after Dick Logan, the airport manager, died. In 1971 the airport became Billings Logan International Airport.

By 1961, Northwest Airlines was operating Lockheed L-188 Electra propjet service into the airport on a routing of New York Idlewild Airport (IDL, now JFK Airport) - Detroit (DTW) - Milwaukee (MKE) - Minneapolis/St. Paul (MSP) - Bismarck, ND (BIS) - Billings (BIL) - Great Falls (GTF) - Spokane (GEG) - Yakima (YKM) - Seattle (SEA).

The jet age arrived in Billings by 1966 when Northwest introduced Boeing 727-100 "Fan Jet" flights in addition to its Electra turboprop service. In 1968, Northwest was operating nonstop 727 jet service from the airport to Chicago O'Hare International Airport, Minneapolis/St. Paul, Great Falls and Spokane as well as direct, no change of plane 727 flights to New York LaGuardia Airport, Newark, Washington, D.C. National Airport, Detroit, Cleveland, Milwaukee, Seattle and Portland, OR.

Western Airlines was serving Billings in 1966 with Lockheed L-188 Electra turboprops with an example routing being Los Angeles (LAX) - San Diego (SAN) - Phoenix (PHX) - Denver (DEN) - Cheyenne (CYS) - Casper (CPR) - Sheridan (SHR) - Billings (BIL). Western was also operating direct Electra propjet service to Calgary (YYC) via a stop in Great Falls (GTF) during the late 1960s. By the early 1970s, Western was operating all of its flights into the airport with Boeing 737-200 jetliners. In 1979, Western was operating nonstop Boeing 727-200 service to both Minneapolis/St. Paul and Seattle as well as flying nonstop Boeing 737-200 service to Denver, Great Falls and Salt Lake City.

For at least part of each year from the late 1970s to early 1980s, Billings was served by wide body McDonnell Douglas DC-10 jetliners operated by Northwest Airlines. In 1979, Northwest was flying DC-10 service on a round trip routing of Newark Liberty International Airport (EWR) - Detroit (DTW) - Chicago O'Hare International Airport (ORD) - Billings (BIL) - Great Falls (GTF) - Spokane (GEG) - Seattle (SEA). By 1982, the airline was operating the DC-10 on a round trip routing of Minneapolis/St. Paul (MSP) - Billings - Great Falls - Spokane - Seattle. The DC-10 was the largest aircraft ever to be operated in scheduled passenger service into the airport. For a short period in 1979, Northwest used a Boeing 747 to provide passenger service to MSP-BIL-SEA. This was at the tail end of a pilot/airline dispute. Northwest also served Billings with Boeing 727-200, McDonnell Douglas DC-9-30, McDonnell Douglas DC-9-50, McDonnell Douglas MD-80 and Airbus A319 jetliners over the years.

In 1983, four airlines were operating mainline jet service into the airport: Continental Airlines with Douglas DC-9-10 and McDonnell Douglas DC-9-30 nonstop flights to Denver and Great Falls, the original Frontier Airlines (1950-1986) with Boeing 737-200 nonstop flights to Denver, Great Falls and Helena, Northwest Airlines with Boeing 727-200 nonstop flights to Great Falls, Helena, Minneapolis/St. Paul and Spokane with direct service to Chicago, Seattle and Portland, OR, and Western Airlines with Boeing 737-200 nonstop flights to Salt Lake City with direct service to Los Angeles and San Francisco. By 1985, Northwest had once again added nonstop service to Chicago O'Hare International Airport flown with Boeing 727-200 aircraft while United Airlines had begun flying Boeing 737-200 nonstop service to Denver. Also in 1985, the airport had commuter airline service operated by Big Sky Airlines, Centennial Airlines and Pioneer Airlines with the latter air carrier operating as Continental Express on behalf of Continental Airlines.

Another airline which operated jet service into Billings was Horizon Air which in 1999 was operating Fokker F28 Fellowship twin jets with nonstop flights to Seattle on behalf of Alaska Airlines. By 2003, the airline was serving Billings with Canadair CRJ-700 regional jets. Horizon Air continues to serve the airport at the present time on behalf of Alaska Airlines with the Bombardier Dash 8 Q400 propjet which is the largest and fastest member of the de Havilland Canada DHC-8 regional turboprop family of aircraft. Additional airlines operating regional jets from the airport in the past included America West Express operated by Mesa Airlines with Canadair CRJ-200 aircraft and Frontier JetExpress flown by Horizon Air with Canadair CRJ-700 aircraft with both air carriers operating nonstop service to Denver.

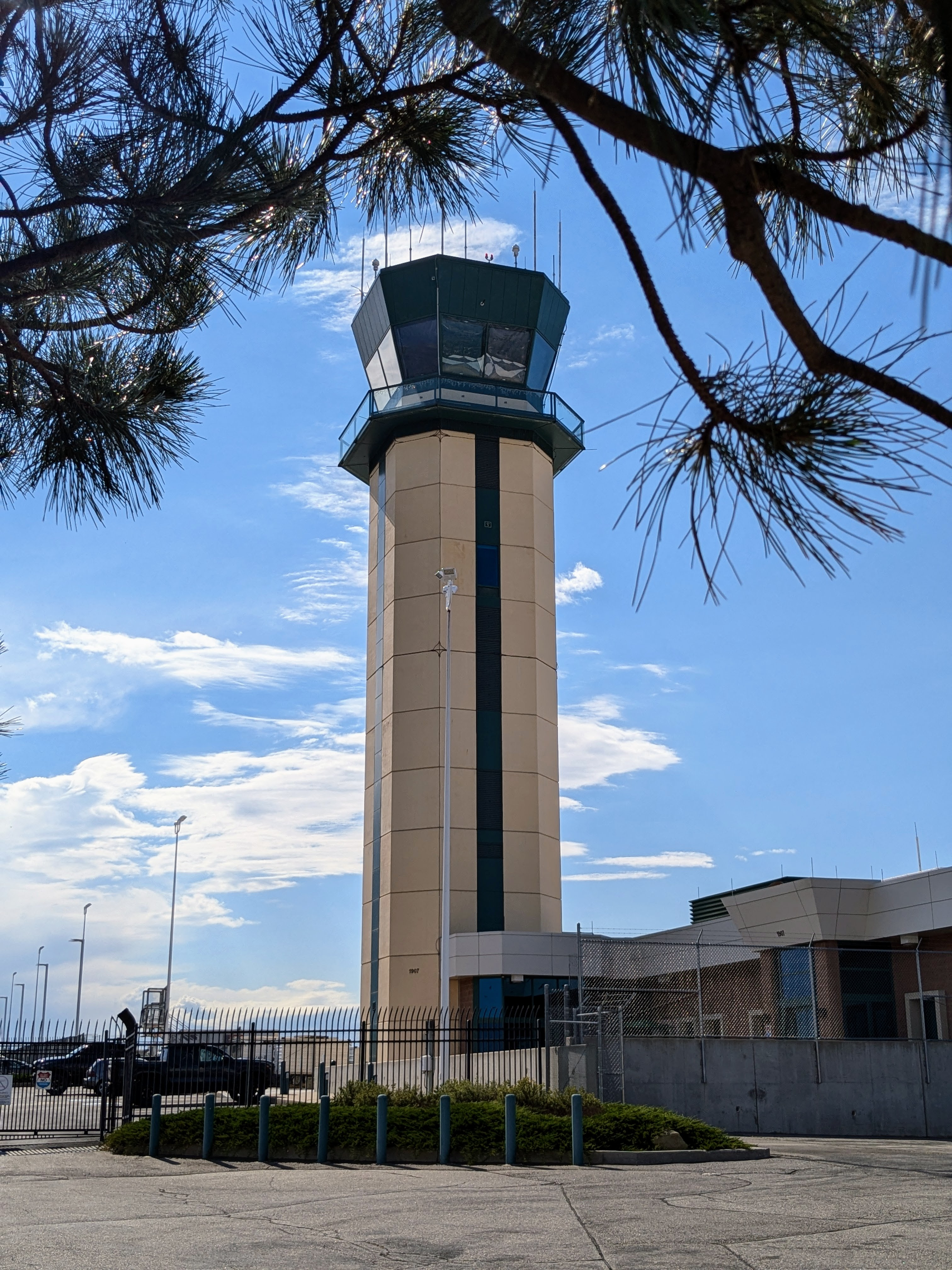
Airport tower

Big Sky Airlines was a commuter air carrier that was based in Billings from 1978 to 2008. Big Sky primarily operated small turboprop airliners including the Beechcraft 1900D, British Aerospace BAe Jetstream 31, Fairchild Swearingen Metroliner (Metro III and Metro 23 models) and Handley Page Jetstream as well as Cessna prop aircraft. The airline operated nonstop flights from the airport to Butte, MT, Casper, WY, Denver, CO, Glasgow, MT, Great Falls, MT, Helena, MT, Lewistown, MT, Miles City, MT, Sidney, MT and Wolf Point, MT at various times during its existence. In addition, Big Sky operated direct, no change of plane flights from the airport to Bismarck, ND, Boise, ID, Dickinson, ND, Havre, MT, Jamestown, ND, Kalispell, MT, Minneapolis/St. Paul, MN, Missoula, MT, Moses Lake, WA, Seattle, WA, Spokane, WA and Williston, ND at various times during its existence as well. Besides operating as an independent air carrier, Big Sky also operated Northwest Airlink service from Billings via a code sharing agreement with Northwest Airlines in 1989.

Between 2019 and 2024, the airport terminal was modernized and expanded for the first time since the 1990s. The project cost was approximately $45 million. The number of gates increased to 9 (from 6), and the number of jet bridges increased to 8 (from 4). The airport remodeled both the A and B concourses and constructed new screening, lobby, restaurant, and gift shop facilities. The project's purpose was to provide capacity for future growth, attract air carriers, and increase the city's economic vitality.

== Airport governance ==
The Aviation and Transit Board governs BIL, with seven members, each appointed for four-year terms. It is required of the position of a board member to possess the qualifications fit for the Mayor's office. With the consent of the Council, the Mayor elects the board members. No board member may be reelected once their term expires. The purpose of the Aviation and Transit Board is not only to help govern the operations of the airport, but also to act as a citizens' advisory board to the City Council. They are to make sure that city policies are implemented and carried out. Shortcomings are to be reported and recommendations are to be made to the City Council.

== Facilities ==
Billings Logan International Airport has three runways. The primary runway is Runway 10L/28R with a length of 10,518 feet and width of 150 feet. ILS/DME on 28R is at 3,738 feet MSL is the lowest approach. The second runway is Runway 07/25 with a length of 5,501 feet and width of 75 feet; this runway serves as the crosswind runway. The final runway is Runway 10R/28L with a length of 3,800 feet and width of 75 feet. This runway serves as the primary runway for single engine and light piston aircraft. All three runways are asphalt.

There are nine taxiways currently in use. Taxiway A runs parallel to Runway 10L/28R, serves as the last exit of Runway 10L and connects to the terminal area. Taxiway B runs through Runway 10L/28R as an access taxiway to the Northern Air Tanker Base. Three Taxiways, C, E and F, serve as exit taxiways that vary in width to serve certain size aircraft. Taxiway D intersects Runway 10L/28R and serves as a northern exit point for Runway 25. Two taxiways (G and H) provide all exits for Runway 10R/28L and Runway 7. Finally, Taxiway J is the primary taxiway from the terminal area to the cargo ramps. Two hotspots exist on the airfield side of operations. Hotspot 1 is located at the intersection of Runway 10R/28L and Runway 7/25. Hotspot 2 is located at the intersection of Taxiway C and Runway 10L/28R.

== Airlines and destinations ==
=== Passenger ===
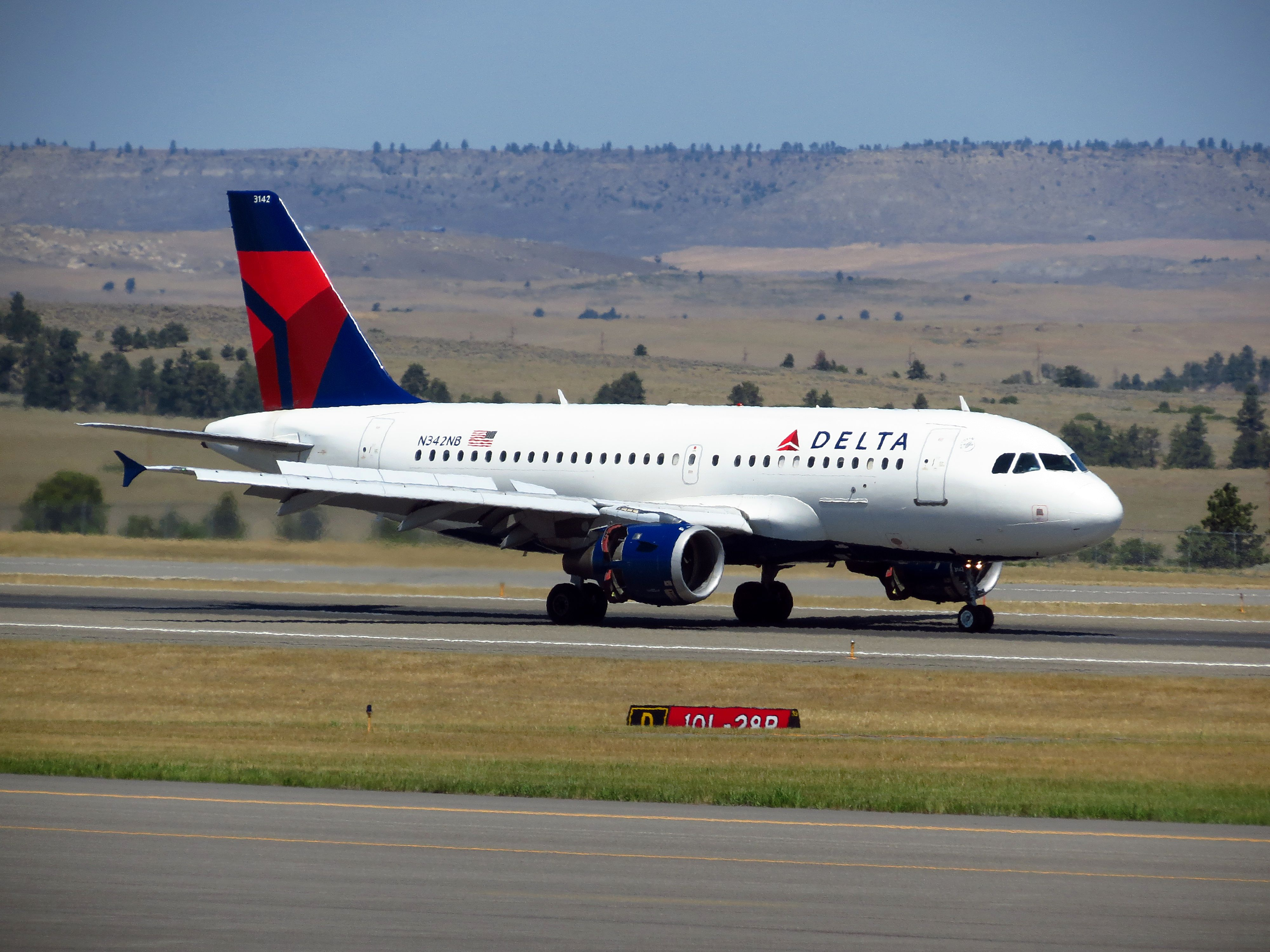
A Delta Air Lines Airbus A319 decelerating on the runway

Airlines	Destinations
Alaska Airlines	Portland (OR), Seattle/Tacoma
Allegiant Air	Las Vegas, Phoenix/Mesa
American Eagle	Dallas/Fort Worth; Seasonal: Chicago–O'Hare, Phoenix–Sky Harbor
Cape Air	Glasgow (MT), Glendive, Havre, Sidney (MT), Wolf Point
Delta Air Lines	Minneapolis/St. Paul, Salt Lake City
Delta Connection	Salt Lake City
United Airlines	Denver
United Express	Chicago–O'Hare, Denver

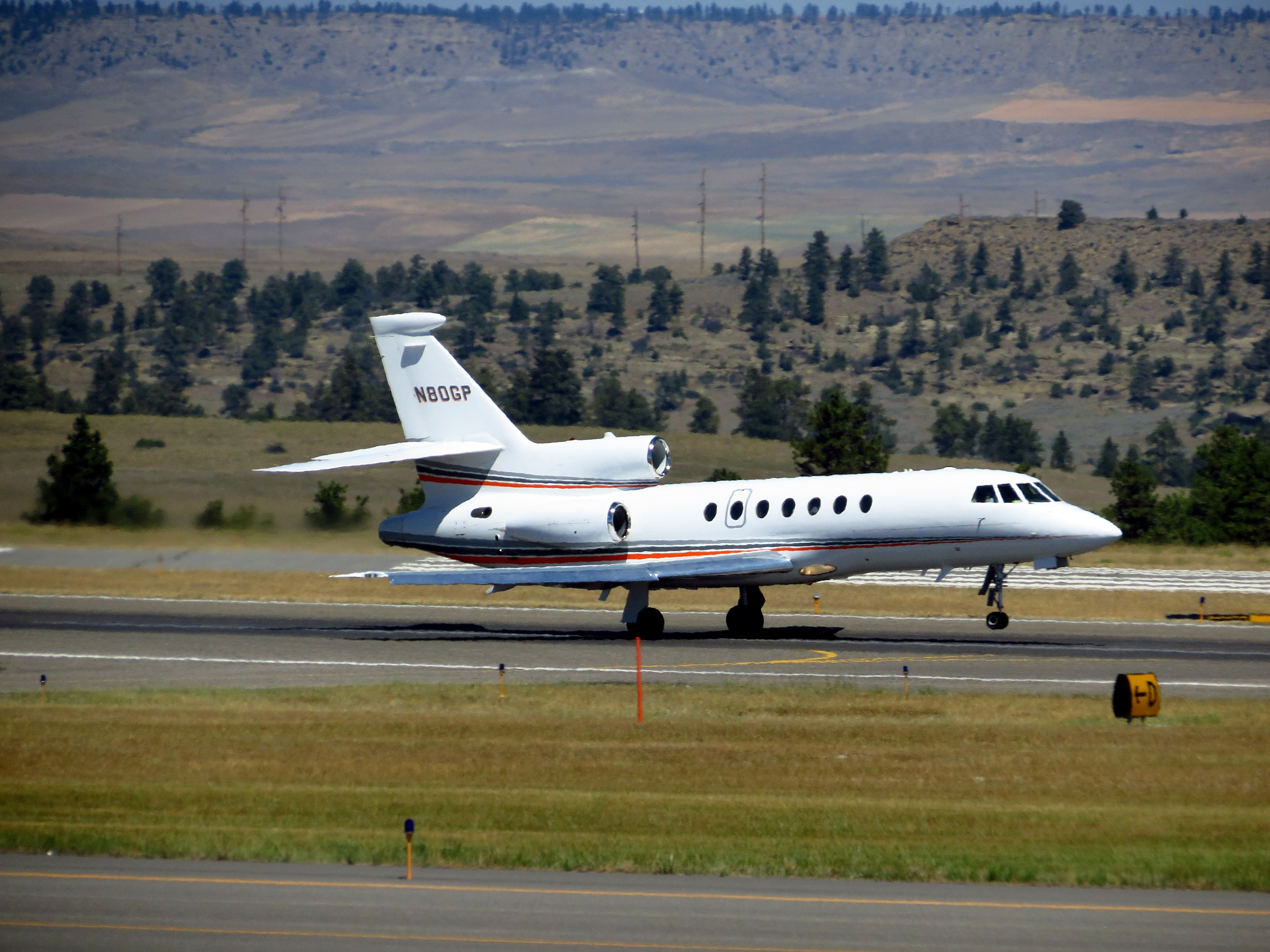
A Dassault Falcon 50

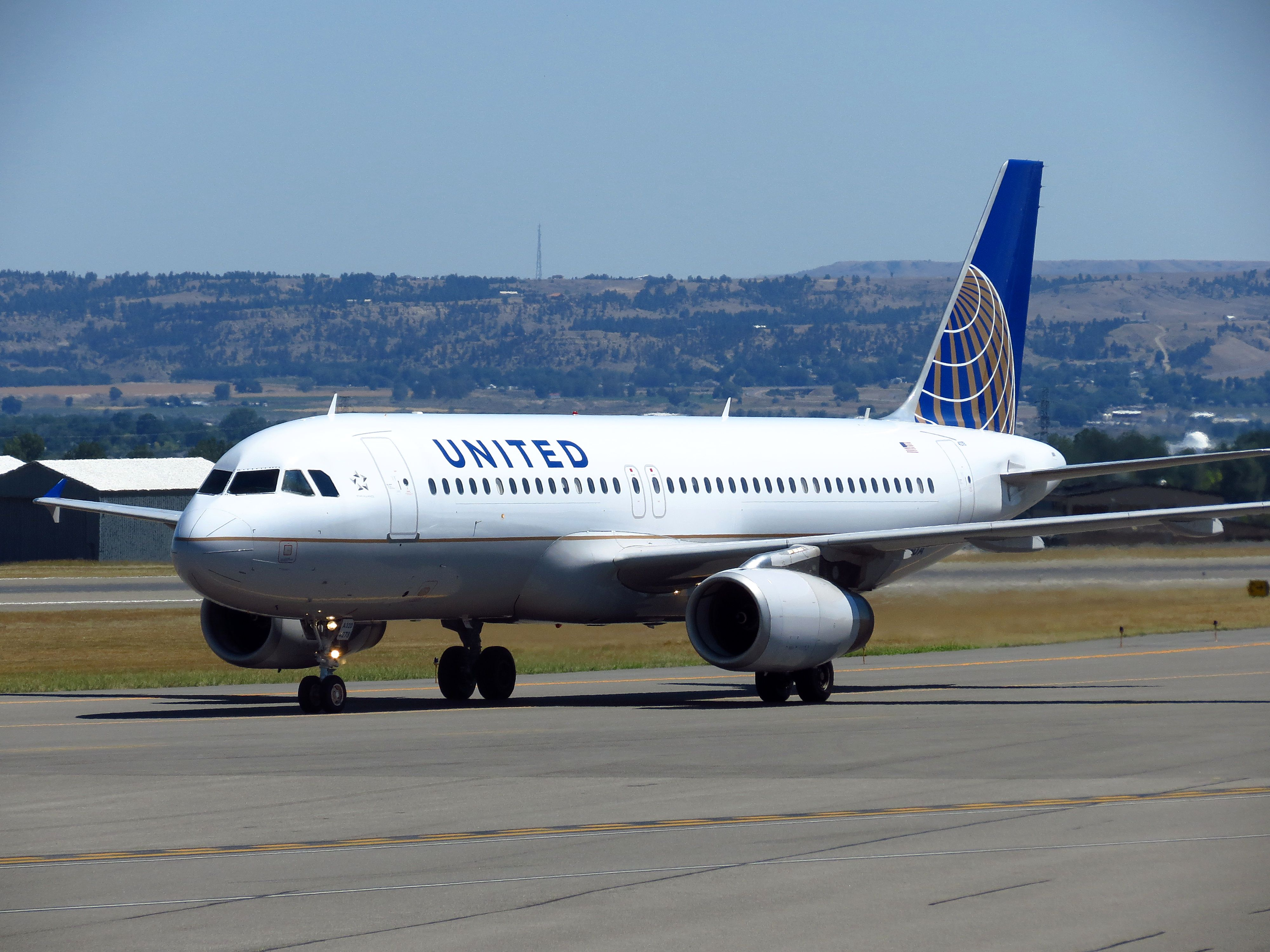
A United Airlines A320 - 200

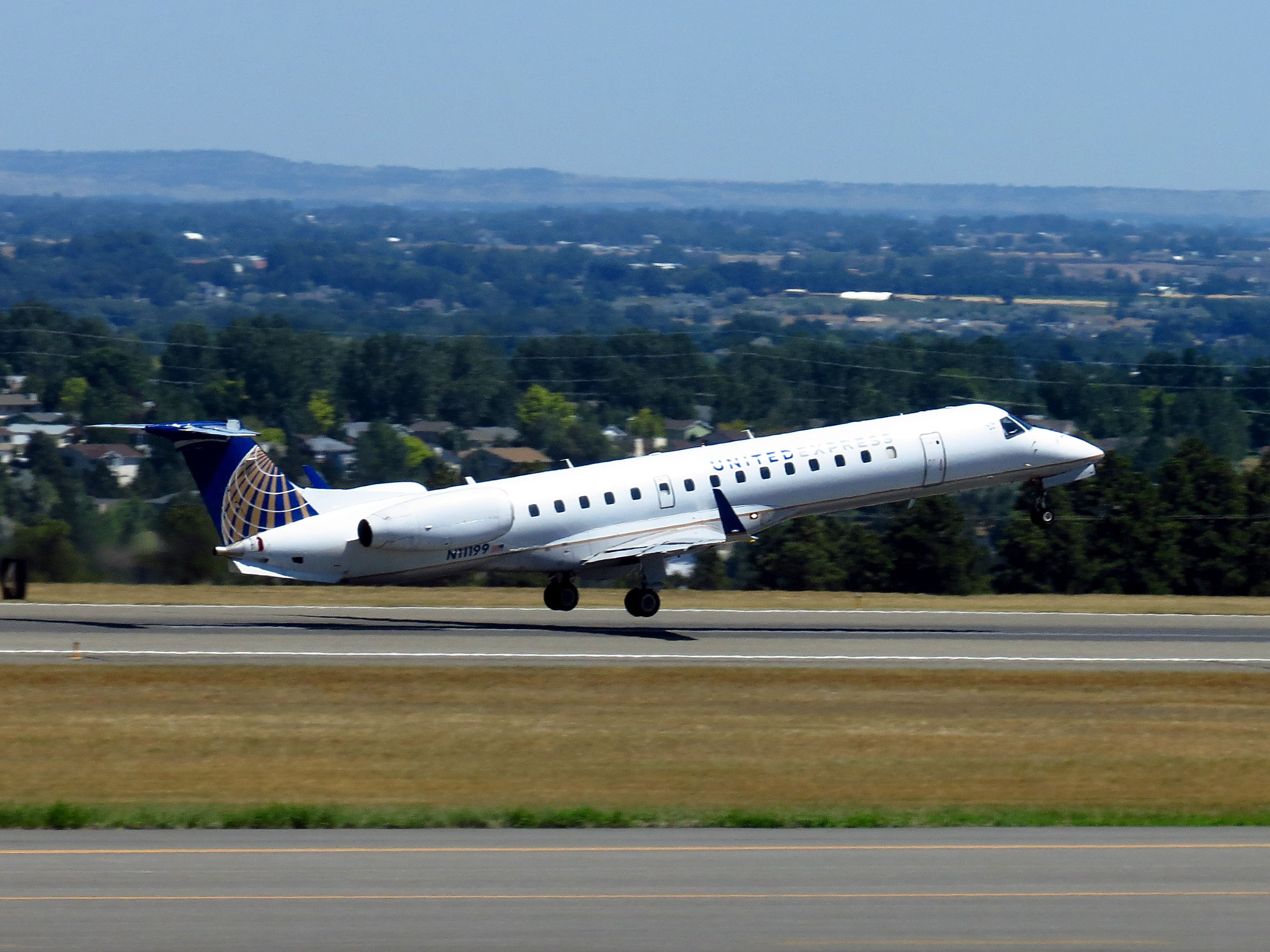
A United Express ERJ 145

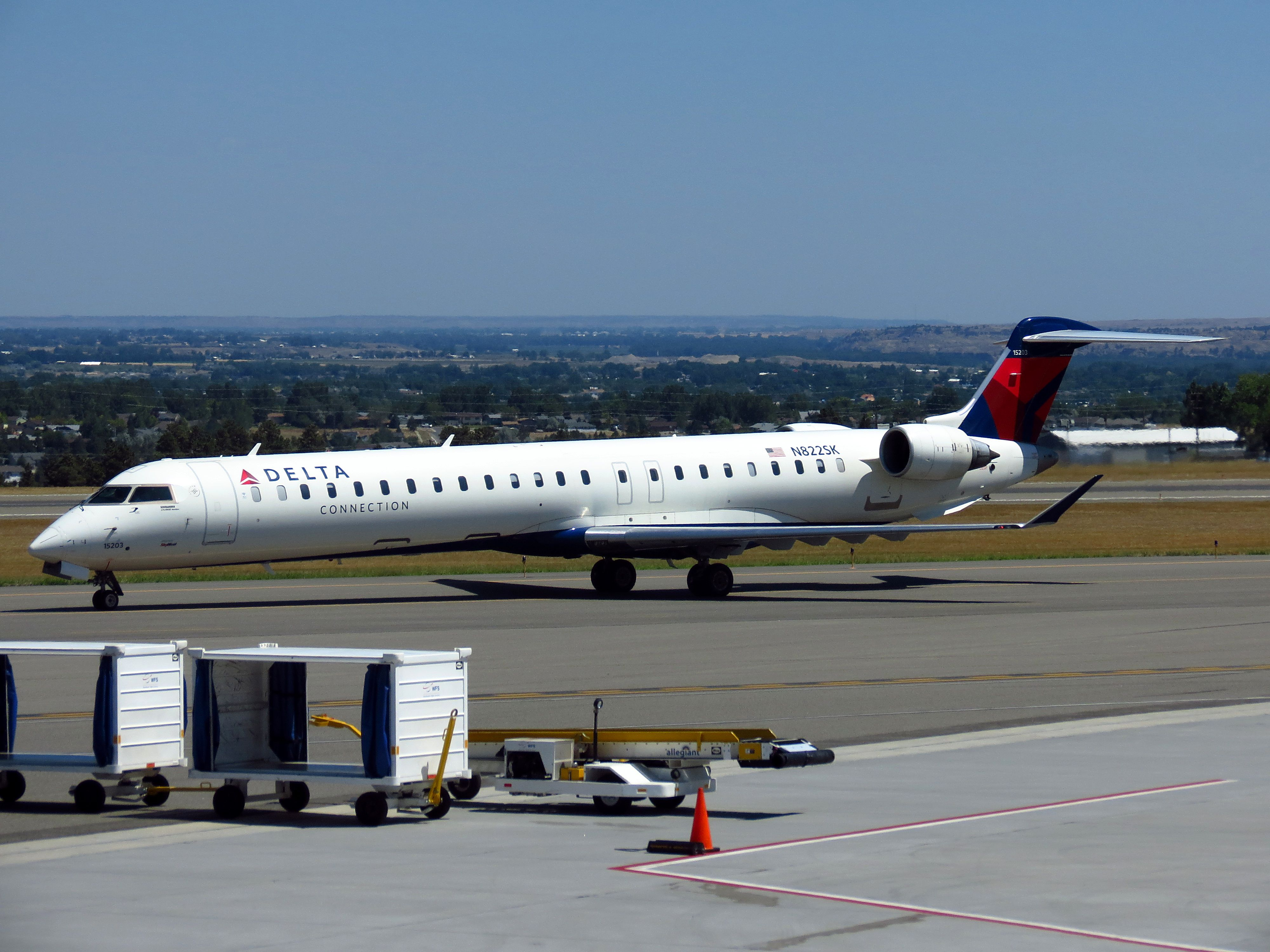
A Delta Connection CRJ 900 at BIL

Destinations map
Destinations from Billings Logan International Airport
Red = Year-round destination
Green = Seasonal destination
Blue = Future destination

=== Cargo ===
Airlines	Destinations
UPS Airlines	Louisville, Ontario
Alpine Air Express	Bozeman, Butte, Helena, Kalispell, Great Falls, Cut Bank, Wolf Point, Sidney, Glendive, Miles City, Gillette
Empire Airlines	Great Falls
Richland Aviation	Sidney, Lewistown, Sheridan

== Statistics ==
=== Top destinations ===
Busiest routes from BIL (August 2025 – July 2026)
Rank	Airport	Passengers	Carriers
1	Denver, Colorado	157,040	United
2	Salt Lake City, Utah	84,550	Delta
3	Seattle/Tacoma, Washington	58,470	Alaska
4	Minneapolis/St. Paul, Minnesota	46,690	Delta
5	Dallas/Fort Worth, Texas	45,360	American
6	Phoenix/Mesa, Arizona	27,220	Allegiant
7	Portland, Oregon	22,320	Alaska
8	Chicago–O'Hare, Illinois	19,570	American
9	Las Vegas, Nevada	15,870	Allegiant
10	Sidney, Montana	6,760	Cape

Largest airlines at BIL (August 2025 – July 2026)
Rank	Airline	Passengers	Share
1	United Airlines	209,000	20.89%
2	SkyWest Airlines	207,000	20.73%
3	Delta Air Lines	170,000	17.05%
4	Horizon Air	161,000	16.13%
5	Envoy Air	131,000	13.08%
	Other	121,000	12.14%

== Accidents and incidents ==
- On July 8, 1938, a Northwest Airlines Lockheed Super Electra stalled on takeoff. One passenger of the ten on board died.
- On December 8, 1945, a Douglas C-47 operated by Northwest Airlines on an Army charter flight from Fargo, North Dakota crashed 3/10 of a mile south of Billings in snowy weather at night, struck trees and crashed. 19 out of the 23 on board were killed.
- On June 25, 1965, a United States Air Force McDonnell F-101B Voodoo crashed on approach.
- On May 17, 1967, a United States Air Force McDonnell F-101B Voodoo crashed approximately 2.7 miles northeast of the airport. Both crewmembers safely ejected.
- On November 1, 1967, a Frontier Airlines Convair 580 making an emergency landing experienced a collapse of its nose gear. Neither the sole passenger or any of the crew were injured, and the aircraft was removed from the runway later that day. Damage to the runway inhibited military aircraft operations until it was repaired later that week.
- On December 18, 1992, a Cessna 550 arriving from Watertown, SD crashed on approach to runway 28R, killing all eight occupants. The investigation found the cause to be wake turbulence from a Boeing 757 that arrived just prior to the incident, causing the aircraft to roll inverted.
- On May 23, 2008, Alpine Air Flight 5008, a Beechcraft 1900C registration N195GA acting as a contract mail flight, impacted terrain about three miles northeast of Billings-Logan International Airport en route to Great Falls International Airport approximately three minutes after takeoff. The sole occupant, the pilot, was killed.
- On November 15, 2015, an El Al Boeing 777-200 made an emergency landing at Billings Logan International Airport. The cockpit received an engine fire warning on the right-hand engine. The plane was en route from Tel Aviv to Los Angeles carrying 297 passengers and 20 crew members. Inspection after landing indicated no fire was present.
- On April 20, 2020, a Piper PA-31T Cheyenne N926K crashed just west of the airport in a local gun and archery establishment. The sole occupant, the pilot, received fatal injuries due to smoke inhalation. A probable cause by some locals favored a possible engine failure upon initial climbout.

== See also ==
- List of airports in Montana
