= Havre City–County Airport =

- IATA: HVR; ICAO: KHVR; FAA LID: HVR

Summary
- Airport type: Public
- Owner: City of Havre & Hill County
- Serves: Havre, Montana
- Elevation AMSL: 2,591 ft (790 m)
- Coordinates: 48°32′35″N 109°45′44″W

Map
- Location of airport in Montana / United States HVR (the United States)

Runways
Direction	Length		Surface
Direction	ft	m	Surface
8/26	5,205	1,586	Asphalt
3/21	3,699	1,127	Asphalt

Statistics (2023)
- Aircraft operations (year ending 5/16/2023): 9,790
- Based aircraft: 29
- Source: Federal Aviation Administration

Havre City–County Airport (IATA: HVR, ICAO: KHVR, FAA LID: HVR) is a public use airport located three nautical miles (6 km) west of the central business district of Havre, a city in Hill County, Montana, United States. It is owned by the City of Havre and Hill County. The airport is served by one commercial airline, subsidized by the Essential Air Service program. Per the Bureau of Statistics Havre was the least used airport in the Continental United States flying under 6000 passengers in the year ending 2023.

As per the Federal Aviation Administration, this airport had 180 passenger boardings (enplanements) in calendar year 2008, 744 in 2009, and 961 in 2010. The National Plan of Integrated Airport Systems for 2011–2015 categorized it as a general aviation airport (the commercial service category requires 2,500 enplanements per year, and Havre does not have that).

Scheduled air service temporarily ceased on March 8, 2008, when Big Sky Airlines ended operations in bankruptcy. Great Lakes Airlines was given United States Department of Transportation approval to take over Essential Air Service (EAS) and flights began in 2009. The airport is now served by Cape Air under EAS contract.

== Facilities and aircraft ==
Havre City–County Airport covers an area of 720 acres (291 ha) at an elevation of 2,591 feet (790 m) above mean sea level. It has two asphalt paved runways: 8/26 is 5,205 by 100 feet (1,586 x 30 m) and 3/21 is 3,699 by 60 feet.

For the 12-month period ending May 16, 2023, the airport had 9,790 aircraft operations, an average of 27 per day: 70% general aviation, 15% air taxi, 15% commercial, and <1% military. At that time 29 aircraft were based at this airport: 28 single-engine and 1 multi-engine.

== Airline and destination ==
The following airline offers scheduled passenger service:

Airlines	Destinations
Cape Air	Billings

=== Statistics ===
Carrier shares. (June 2023 - May 2024)
Carrier	Passengers (arriving and departing)
Cape Air	5,880(100%)

Top domestic destinations (June 2023 - June 2024)
Rank	Airport	Passengers	Airline
1	Billings, Montana	2,990	Cape Air

== See also ==
- List of airports in Montana
