= Cut Bank Municipal Airport =

Cut Bank Municipal Airport Cut Bank Army Air Field
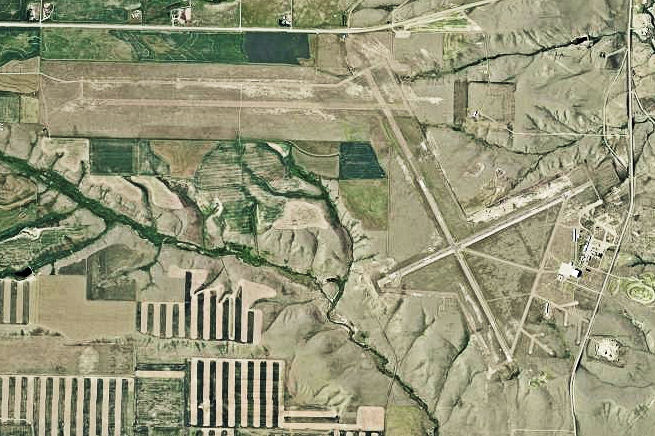
- 2006 USGS photo
- IATA: CTB; ICAO: KCTB; FAA LID: CTB

Summary
- Airport type: Public
- Owner: Cut Bank and Glacier County
- Serves: Cut Bank, Montana
- Location: Glacier County, near Cut Bank, Montana
- Elevation AMSL: 3,858 ft (1,176 m)
- Coordinates: 48°36′30″N 112°22′34″W
- Website: CutbankAirport.org

Map
- Location

Runways
Direction	Length		Surface
Direction	ft	m	Surface
5/23	5,300	1,615	Asphalt
14/32	5,300	1,615	Asphalt

Statistics (2023)
- Aircraft operations (year ending 7/27/2023: 8,250
- Based aircraft: 18
- Source: Federal Aviation Administration

Cut Bank Municipal Airport (IATA: CTB, ICAO: KCTB, FAA LID: CTB) is three miles southwest of Cut Bank, in Glacier County, Montana, United States. It is owned by Cut Bank and Glacier County.

The airport's website calls it Cut Bank International Airport. Its first flight was on 1 June 1941.

== Facilities ==
Cut Bank Municipal Airport covers 1,730 acres (700 ha) at an elevation of 3,858 feet (1,176 m). It has two asphalt runways: 5/23 is 5,300 by 75 feet (1,615 x 23 m) and 14/32 is 5,300 by 75 feet (1,615 x 23 m).

In the year ending July 27, 2023, the airport had 8,250 aircraft operations, average 23 per day: 93% general aviation, 6% air taxi and 2% military. 18 aircraft were then based at the airport: 17 single-engine, and 1 multi-engine.

== Airlines and destinations ==
Cargo

Airlines	Destinations
Alpine Air Express	Billings, Great Falls

== History ==
- Cut Bank Municipal Airport and Army Air Force Base
- U.S. National Register of Historic Places
- U.S. Historic district
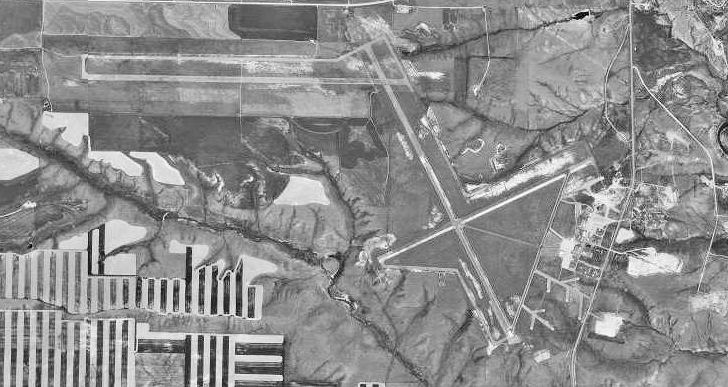

- Location within Montana Location within the United States
- Location: Valier Hwy., Cut Bank, Montana
- Coordinates: 48.6075°N 112.3663°W
- Area: 1,460 acres (5.9 km^{2})
- Built: 1942
- Built by: Army Corps of Engineers; et.al.
- Architectural style: WWII Temporary Bldgs.
- NRHP reference No.: 07001494
- Added to NRHP: January 29, 2008

During World War II Cut Bank Army Air Field was used by the Second Air Force as an auxiliary heavy bomber training airfield, being controlled by Great Falls Army Air Base. Several squadrons of groups training at Great Falls in B-17 Flying Fortresses trained at Cut Bank. Known squadrons were:

- 2nd Bombardment Group, 429th Bomb Squadron, November 1942-March 1943
- 385th Bombardment Group, 550th Bomb Squadron, March–June 1943
- 390th Bombardment Group, 569th Bomb Squadron, June–July 1943
- 401st Bombardment Group, 613th Bomb Squadron, July–October 1943

During the Cold War Cut Bank AFB was an interceptor base, part of Air Defense Command.

The Cut Bank Municipal Airport and Army Air Force Base, on Valier Highway in Cut Bank, Montana was built in 1942. It was listed on the National Register of Historic Places in 2008. The listing included eight contributing buildings, 27 contributing structures, and four contributing sites on 1,460 acres (5.9 km^{2}).

It was built by the Army Corps of Engineers and includes World War II temporary buildings. It has also been known as Cut Bank International Airport.

== See also ==
- Montana World War II Army Airfields
- List of military installations in Montana
- List of airports in Montana
