= Sidney–Richland Municipal Airport =

Airport in Montana, United States

- IATA: SDY; ICAO: KSDY; FAA LID: SDY

Summary
- Airport type: Public
- Owner: Sidney Richland Airport Authority
- Serves: Sidney, Montana
- Elevation AMSL: 1,985 ft (605 m)
- Coordinates: 47°42′25″N 104°11′33″W
- Website: www.sidneymtairport.com

Maps
- FAA airport diagram as of January 2021
- Location within Montana Location within the United States

Runways
Direction	Length		Surface
Direction	ft	m	Surface
1/19	5,705	1,739	Asphalt
11/29	4,023	1,226	Asphalt

Statistics (2018)
- Aircraft operations: 11,555
- Based aircraft: 34
- Source: Federal Aviation Administration

Sidney–Richland Municipal Airport (IATA: SDY, ICAO: KSDY, FAA LID: SDY) is a mile west of Sidney, in Richland County, Montana, United States. The airport is served by one airline, subsidized by the federal government's Essential Air Service program, at a cost of $3,777,579 (per year).

The Federal Aviation Administration says this airport had 2,031 passenger boardings (enplanements) in calendar year 2008, 2,766 in 2009, and 3,659 in 2010. The National Plan of Integrated Airport Systems for 2011–2015 categorized it as a general aviation airport based on enplanements in 2008 (the commercial service category requires at least 2,500 enplanements per year).

== Passenger air service past & present ==
Scheduled air service temporarily ceased on March 8, 2008, when Big Sky Airlines ended operations due to a bankruptcy. In 1985, Big Sky was operating nonstop flights into the airport from Billings and Williston, ND as an independent air carrier with Fairchild Swearingen Metroliner commuter propjets. By 1989, Big Sky was operating as a Northwest Airlink air carrier on behalf of Northwest Airlines via a code sharing agreement and was continuing to serve Sidney with nonstop Metroliner propjet flights from Billings and Williston. By the early 1990s, Big Sky was no longer operating as a Northwest Airlink air carrier but was continuing to serve the airport as an independent airline and by 1995 was operating nonstop Metroliner propjet flights to the airport from Billings and Glendive, MT.

Following cessation of service by Big Sky, Great Lakes Airlines was then given USDOT approval to take over federal Essential Air Service (EAS) flights and flights began in 2009. Between 2011 and 2013, service was provided under a federal EAS contract by Silver Airways (formerly Gulfstream International Airlines).

Effective December 10, 2013, passenger service between Sidney and Billings was initiated by Cape Air with small Cessna 402C twin prop aircraft with Cape Air continuing to serve the airport at the present time with five flights per day to Billings.

The first airline flights were operated by the original Frontier Airlines (1950–1986) with Douglas DC-3 aircraft commencing in September 1954. By 1968, Combs Aviation, a commuter air carrier operating small Aero Commander 500 twin prop aircraft, was serving the airport on behalf of Frontier via a contract agreement following cessation of Frontier DC-3 flights; however, Frontier then returned to Sidney with de Havilland Canada DHC-6 Twin Otter commuter turboprop flights and continued to serve Sidney until 1980. In 1977, Frontier was operating round trip Twin Otter service on a routing of Billings - Miles City, MT - Glendive, MT - Sidney - Williston, ND - Minot with connections at both Billings and Minot to and from Boeing 737-200 jet flights operated by Frontier. Big Sky Airlines then began serving the airport during the early 1980s primarily with Handley Page Jetstream and Fairchild Swearingen Metroliner commuter propjets with nonstop flights from Billings, Glendive and Williston.

== Facilities ==
The airport covers 335 acres (136 ha) at an elevation of 1,985 feet (605 m). It has two asphalt runways: 1/19 is 5,705 by 100 feet (1,739 x 30 m) and 11/29 is 4,023 by 100 feet.

In 2009 the airport had 6,815 aircraft operations, average 18 per day: 59% general aviation, 26% airline, 15% air taxi, and <1% military. 32 aircraft were then based at the airport: 84% single-engine and 16% multi-engine.

== Statistics ==
Carrier shares (April 2025 - March 2026)
Carrier	Passengers (arriving and departing)
Cape Air	12,500(100%)

Top domestic destinations (April 2025 - March 2026)
Rank	Airport	Passengers	Airline
1	Billings, Montana	6,400	Cape Air

== See also ==
- List of airports in Montana
