= Lewistown Municipal Airport =

Airport in Montana, United States

Lewistown Municipal Airport Lewistown Army Airfield
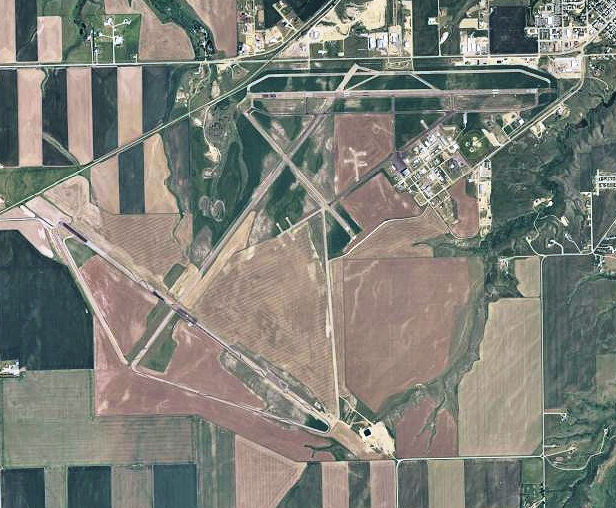
- USGS 2006 orthophoto
- IATA: LWT; ICAO: KLWT; FAA LID: LWT

Summary
- Airport type: Public
- Owner: City of Lewistown & Fergus County
- Serves: Lewistown, Montana
- Elevation AMSL: 4,170 ft (1,270 m)
- Coordinates: 47°02′57″N 109°28′00″W

Map
- Location in Montana

Runways
Direction	Length		Surface
Direction	ft	m	Surface
8/26	6,100	1,859	Asphalt
3/21	5,600	1,707	Asphalt
13/31	4,102	1,250	Asphalt

Statistics (2011)
- Aircraft operations: 16,804
- Based aircraft: 58
- Source: Federal Aviation Administration

Lewistown Municipal Airport (IATA: LWT, ICAO: KLWT, FAA LID: LWT) is two miles southwest of Lewistown, in Fergus County, Montana. It is owned by the city and county.

Federal Aviation Administration records say the airport had 596 passenger boardings (enplanements) in calendar year 2008, 1,049 in 2009 and 704 in 2010. The National Plan of Integrated Airport Systems for 2011–2015 called it as a general aviation airport (the commercial service category requires 2,500 enplanements per year).

Scheduled air service temporarily ceased on March 8, 2008, when Big Sky Airlines ended operations in bankruptcy. Great Lakes Airlines was given USDOT approval to take over Essential Air Service (EAS) and flights began in 2009. Service was then provided under EAS contract by Silver Airways (formerly Gulfstream International Airlines) until July 2013. EAS subsidies were terminated on July 15, 2013 due to subsidy per passenger exceeding $1000, leaving Lewistown without scheduled air service.

== History ==
Lewistown Army Airfield was built in 1942 as one of four training facilities for B-17 Flying Fortress crews and had a storage site for the top secret Norden Bombsight.

Lewistown was a satellite field for Great Falls Army Air Base. Squadrons were trained in navigation in addition to receiving gunnery and bombing practice. After training, the men were sent to the European front.

The airfield was in operation during a 12-month period between 1942 and 1943 and thereafter deactivated. The field was declared surplus in 1948 and has been a municipal airport ever since.

== Historical airline service ==
Inland Air Lines began the first scheduled commercial air service to Lewistown in the late 1930's with a route from Cheyenne, Wyoming to Great Falls, Montana making stops at Casper, Sheridan, Billings, and Lewistown. Inland was acquired by Western Airlines in 1944 and merged into Western in 1952. By then the route was originating at Denver, Colorado and stops were made at Cheyenne as well all other cities mentioned. Western ended service to Lewistown about 1960.

The original Frontier Airlines (1950-1986) served the airport from 1960 through 1980 with nonstop flights to Billings and Great Falls in Montana as well as direct flights to Denver, Salt Lake City and other destinations in the U.S. intermountain west. Frontier began their service using Douglas DC-3 piston aircraft but soon upgraded using Convair 340's and later to Convair 580 turbo props by the mid-1960's. Service was briefly suspended in 1970 but returned in 1971 with de Havilland Canada DHC-6 Twin Otter aircraft.

Big Sky Airlines then served Lewistown from 1980 until 2008 operating commuter airline flights on a Billings - Lewistown - Havre, Montana route. Big Sky also operated as a Northwest Airlink code-share affiliate for Northwest Airlines.

Great Lakes Airlines then served the airport from 2008 through 2011 with direct flights to Denver making a stop at Worland, Wyoming.

Silver Airways was the final air carrier to serve Lewistown providing service on a Billings - Lewistown - Havre route from 2011 until July 15, 2013.

== Facilities ==
The airport covers 2,200 acres (890 ha) at an elevation of 4,170 feet (1,271 m). It has three asphalt runways: 8/26 is 6,100 by 100 feet (1,859 x 30 m), 3/21 is 5,600 by 100 feet (1,707 x 30 m), and 13/31 is 4,102 by 60 feet (1,250 x 18 m).

In 2011 the airport had 16,804 aircraft operations, average 46 per day: 81% general aviation, 15% air taxi, and 4% military. 58 aircraft were then based at the airport: 85% single-engine, 10% multi-engine, and 5% helicopter.

== See also ==
- Montana World War II Army Airfields
- List of airports in Montana
