= Miles City Airport =

Miles City Airport Frank Wiley Field
- IATA: MLS; ICAO: KMLS; FAA LID: MLS

Summary
- Airport type: Public
- Owner: Miles City
- Serves: Miles City, Montana
- Elevation AMSL: 2,630 ft / 802 m
- Coordinates: 46°25′41″N 105°53′10″W

Map
- Location in Montana Location in the United States

Runways
Direction	Length		Surface
Direction	ft	m	Surface
4/22	5,680	1,731	Asphalt
13/31	5,628	1,715	Asphalt

Statistics (2009)
- Aircraft operations: 11,200
- Based aircraft: 20
- Sources: Airport and FAA

Miles City Airport or Frank Wiley Field (IATA: MLS, ICAO: KMLS, FAA LID: MLS) is a city-owned airport two miles northwest of Miles City, in Custer County, Montana, United States. The airport was served by one airline, subsidized by the Essential Air Service program. EAS subsidies ended on July 15, 2013, due to subsidy per passenger exceeding $1000, leaving Miles City without scheduled air service.

Federal Aviation Administration records say the airport had 264 passenger boardings (enplanements) in calendar year 2008, 891 in 2009 and 1,033 in 2010. The National Plan of Integrated Airport Systems for 2011–2015 called it a general aviation airport (the commercial service category requires 2,500 enplanements per year).

Scheduled air service temporarily ceased on March 8, 2008, when Big Sky Airlines ended operations in bankruptcy. Great Lakes Airlines was given USDOT approval to take over Essential Air Service (EAS) and flights began in 2009. From 2011 to 2013, service had been provided under EAS contract by Silver Airways (formerly Gulfstream International Airlines).

== Facilities ==
Frank Wiley Field covers 1,640 acres (2.56 mi^{2}; 6.6 km^{2}) at an elevation of 2,630 feet (802 m) above sea level. It has two asphalt runways: 4/22 is 5,680 by 75 feet (1,731 by 23 m) and 13/31 is 5,628 by 100 feet (1,715 by 30 m).

In 2009, the airport had 11,200 aircraft operations, average 30 per day: 71% general aviation and 29% air taxi. 20 aircraft were then based at this airport: 90% single-engine and 10% multi-engine.

== Historical airline service ==
The first known commercial air service to Miles City was provided by Mamer Air Transport in 1930. Mamer used Ford trimotor aircraft on a route between Spokane and Minneapolis/St. Paul making multiple stops.

Northwest Airlines then served Miles City as one of multiple stops along the carrier's mainline route between Seattle and Chicago from the early 1930s until 1954. The mainline route was extended eastward to New York and Washington D.C. by 1950. Northwest flew Lockheed Model 10 Electra followed by Douglas DC-3 aircraft for its service to Miles City.

Frontier Airlines (1950-1986) served the airport from 1954 until 1980 with flights to Billings and Bismarck. Some flights to Billings would continue onto Salt Lake City via multiple stops. Douglas DC-3 prop and Convair 580 turboprop aircraft were used. Combs Aviation also provided service to Miles City from 1968 through 1970 with Aero Commander 500 twin prop aircraft on behalf of Frontier via a contract agreement, and for a period in 1970, Frontier contracted all of its Miles City service to Combs. Combs then ended their contract service and Frontier returned in 1971 using de Havilland Canada DHC-6 Twin Otter turboprop aircraft.

Big Sky Airlines provided turboprop service to Billings from 1980 until 2008 using Fairchild Swearingen Metroliner commuter aircraft followed by Beech 1900D commuter aircraft.

Great Lakes Airlines flew from Miles City to Denver with one stop at Gillette, WY using Beech 1900D aircraft from 2008 through mid-2011.

Silver Airways was the final carrier providing service to Billings from 2011 until all service ended on July 15, 2013, after government subsidies were cancelled due to a lack of passenger traffic. Silver also flew Beech 1900D aircraft.

== Accidents ==
- Northwest Airlines Flight 1 – Lockheed Super Electra – January 13, 1938
- Northwest Airlines Flight 1 – Douglas DC-3A – May 12, 1942
- Frontier Airlines Flight 32 – Douglas DC-3C – March 12, 1964

== See also ==
- List of airports in Montana

== Other sources ==
- Essential Air Service documents (Docket OST-1997-2605 Archived 2012-09-25 at the Wayback Machine) from the U.S. Department of Transportation:
  - Order 2005-12-20 Archived 2012-09-25 at the Wayback Machine: selecting Big Sky Transportation Co., d/b/a Big Sky Airlines, to continue providing essential air service at seven Montana communities (Glasgow, Glendive, Havre, Lewistown, Miles City, Sidney, and Wolf Point) for a new two-year period beginning March 1, 2006, at a subsidy of $6,838,934 annually.
  - Order 2007-11-21 Archived 2012-09-25 at the Wayback Machine: selecting Big Sky Transportation Co., d/b/a Big Sky Airlines, to continue providing essential air service at seven Montana communities for a new two-year period beginning March 1, 2008, at a subsidy of $8,473,617 annually.
  - Order 2007-12-22 Archived 2012-09-25 at the Wayback Machine: allowing Big Sky Transportation Co., d/b/a Big Sky Airlines, to suspend its subsidized essential air services at seven Montana communities on the date that Great Lakes Aviation, Ltd., begins replacement service, and selecting Great Lakes to provide those services at subsidy rates totaling $8,201,992.
  - Order 2008-7-9 Archived 2012-09-25 at the Wayback Machine: approving an alternate service pattern requested by Lewistown, Miles City and Sidney, Montana.
  - Order 2011-1-27 Archived 2012-09-25 at the Wayback Machine: selecting Gulfstream International Airlines, to provide subsidized essential air service (EAS) with 19-passenger Beechcraft B-1900D aircraft at Glasgow, Glendive, Havre, Lewistown, Miles City, Sidney, and Wolf Point, Montana, for a two-year period beginning when the carrier inaugurates full EAS at all seven communities through the end of the 24th month thereafter, at a combined annual subsidy rate of $10,903,854.
