= Dawson Community Airport =

Airport in Montana, United States

- IATA: GDV; ICAO: KGDV; FAA LID: GDV

Summary
- Airport type: Public
- Owner: Dawson County
- Serves: Glendive, Montana
- Elevation AMSL: 2,458 ft (749 m)
- Coordinates: 47°08′19″N 104°48′26″W
- Website: www.dawsoncountymontana.org

Map
- Location within Montana Location within the United States

Runways
Direction	Length		Surface
Direction	ft	m	Surface
12/30	5,704	1,739	Asphalt
2/20	3,002	915	Asphalt

Statistics (2019)
- Aircraft operations (year ending 6/5/2019): 5,880
- Based aircraft: 14
- Source: Federal Aviation Administration

Dawson Community Airport (IATA: GDV, ICAO: KGDV, FAA LID: GDV) is five miles northwest of Glendive, in Dawson County, Montana, United States. The airport has one airline, subsidized by the Essential Air Service program.

The Federal Aviation Administration says this airport had 211 passenger boardings (enplanements) in calendar year 2008, 243 in 2009 and 427 in 2010. The National Plan of Integrated Airport Systems for 2011–2015 categorized it as a general aviation airport (the commercial service category requires at least 2,500 enplanements per year).

== History ==
The airport opened around 1970, replacing the airport on the east side of the river just north of I-94. Northwest Airlines served Glendive from about 1933 until 1936 as one of multiple stops on a route between Seattle and Chicago. Frontier Airlines started flights to the old airport in 1954; its Twin Otters stopped flying out of the new airport in 1980.

Scheduled air service temporarily ceased on March 8, 2008, when Big Sky Airlines ended operations in bankruptcy. Great Lakes Airlines was given USDOT approval to take over Essential Air Service (EAS) and flights began in 2009. Service is currently provided under EAS contract by Cape Air.

== Facilities ==
Dawson Community Airport covers 413 acres (167 ha) at an elevation of 2,458 feet (749 m). It has two asphalt runways: 12/30 is 5,704 by 100 feet (1,739 x 30 m) and 2/20 is 3,002 by 60 feet (915 x 18 m).

In the year ending June 5, 2019, the airport had 5,880 aircraft operations, averaging 113 per week: 52% air taxi, 47% general aviation, and <1% military. 14 aircraft were then based at the airport, all single-engine.

== Airline and destination ==
Airlines	Destinations
Cape Air	Billings

=== Statistics ===
Carrier shares (March 2021 - February 2022)
Carrier	Passengers (arriving and departing)
Cape Air	4,330(100%)

Top domestic destinations (March 2021 - February 2022)
Rank	Airport	Passengers	Airline
1	Billings Logan International (BIL)	2,000	Cape Air

== See also ==
- List of airports in Montana
