= L. M. Clayton Airport =

Airport in Montana, United States

- IATA: OLF; ICAO: KOLF; FAA LID: OLF

Summary
- Airport type: Public
- Owner: City of Wolf Point & Roosevelt County
- Serves: Wolf Point, Montana
- Elevation AMSL: 1,989 ft (606 m)
- Coordinates: 48°05′40″N 105°34′30″W

Map
- Location within Montana Location within the United States

Runways
Direction	Length		Surface
Direction	ft	m	Surface
11/29	5,091	1,552	Asphalt

Statistics (2019)
- Aircraft operations: 4,602
- Based aircraft: 5
- Source: Federal Aviation Administration

L. M. Clayton Airport (IATA: OLF, ICAO: KOLF, FAA LID: OLF) is a public airport three miles east of Wolf Point, in Roosevelt County, Montana, United States. The airport is served by one airline, subsidized by the Essential Air Service program. Reportedly, it is the smallest airport in the 48 contiguous states with scheduled air service.

The Federal Aviation Administration says this airport had 321 passenger boardings (enplanements) in calendar year 2008, 900 in 2009 and 494 in 2010. The National Plan of Integrated Airport Systems for 2011–2015 categorized it as a general aviation airport (the commercial service category requires at least 2,500 enplanements per year).

Scheduled air service temporarily ceased on March 8, 2008, when Big Sky Airlines ended operations in bankruptcy. Great Lakes Airlines was given USDOT approval to take over Essential Air Service (EAS) and flights began in 2009. Service is currently provided under EAS contract by Cape Air.

The first airline flights were Frontier DC-3s in 1954–55; Frontier pulled out in 1980.

== Facilities ==
L. M. Clayton Airport covers 290 acres (117 ha) at an elevation of 1,989 feet (606 m). Its one runway, 11/29, is 5,091 by 100 feet (1,552 x 30 m) asphalt.

In 2011 the airport had 5,975 aircraft operations, average 16 per day: 53% general aviation, 47% air taxi, and <1% military. Eight aircraft were then based at the airport, all with five or fewer engines.

== Airline and destination ==
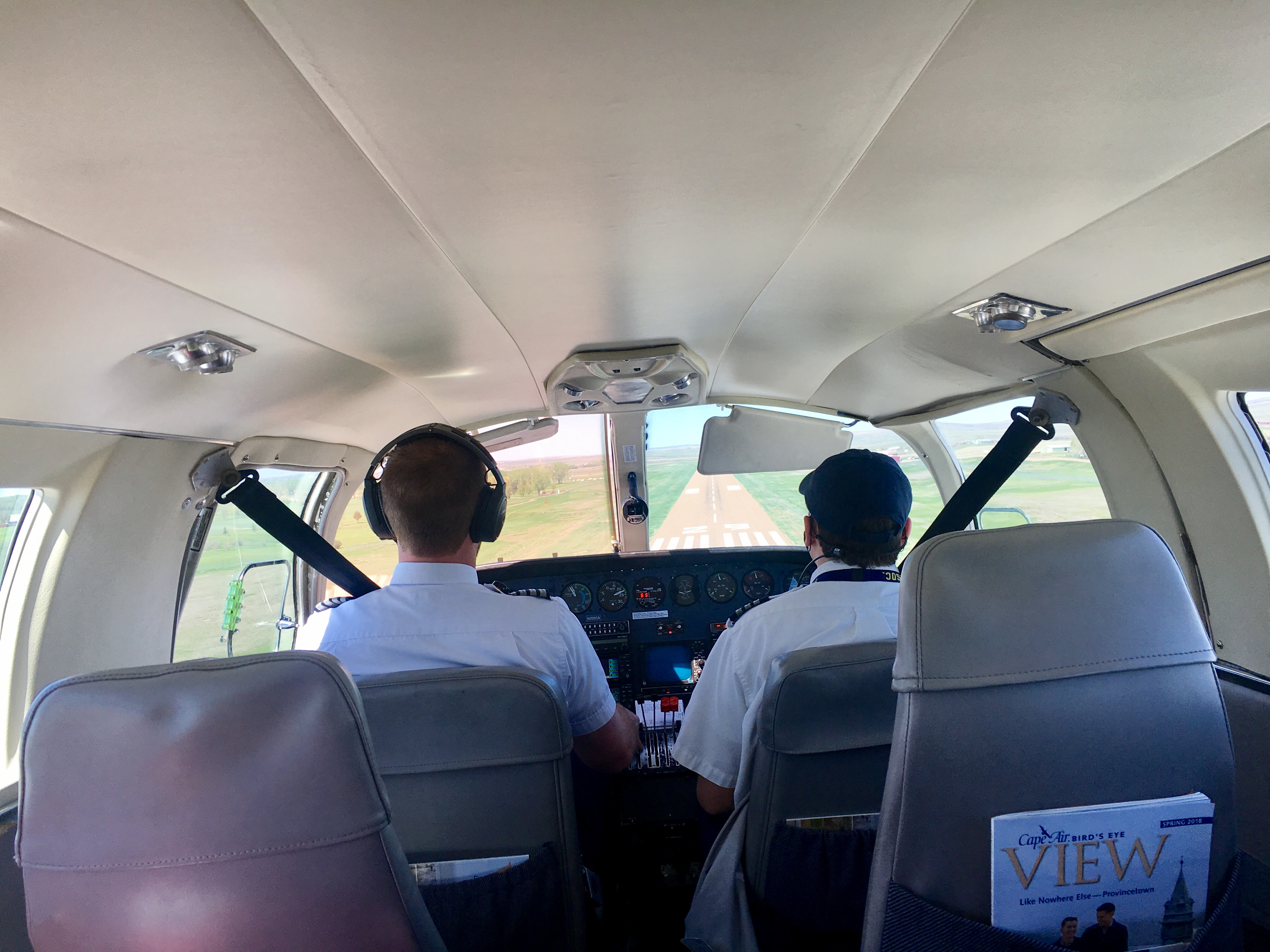
Approaching Runway 29 at L.M. Clayton Airport

Airlines	Destinations
Cape Air	Billings

=== Statistics ===
Carrier shares (November 2021 - October 2022)
Carrier	Passengers (arriving and departing)
Cape Air	6,300(100%)

Top domestic destinations (November 2021 - October 2022)
Rank	Airport	Passengers	Airline
1	Billings, Montana	2,000	Cape Air
1	Sidney, Montana	1,000	Cape Air

== See also ==
- List of airports in Montana
