= Airfields of the United States Army Air Forces Second Air Force =

The list of Airfields of the United States Army Air Forces Second Air Force is as follows:

Heavy Bombardment Training Stations

- Ainsworth Army Air Field
- Alamogordo Army Air Field
- Alexandria Army Air Field
- Brownwood Army Air Field
- Bruning Army Air Field
- Casper Army Air Field
- Clovis Army Air Field
- Cut Bank Army Air Field
- Dalhart Army Air Field
- Davis-Monthan Field
- Dyersburg Army Air Base
- Ephrata Army Air Field
- Fairmont Army Air Field
- Fort Worth Army Air Field
- Glasgow Army Air Field
- Grand Island Army Air Field
- Great Bend Army Air Field
- Great Falls Army Air Base
- Greensboro Army Air Base
- Harvard Army Air Field
- Herington Army Air Field
- Kearney Army Air Field
- Kirtland Field
- Lewistown Army Air Field
- Liberal Army Air Field
- MacDill Field
- McCook Army Air Field
- Mitchell Army Air Field
- Moses Lake Army Air Base
- Mountain Home Army Air Field
- Peterson Field
- Pierre Regional Airport
- Pocatello Regional Airport
- Pratt Army Air Field
- Pueblo Memorial Airport
- Pyote Army Air Field
- Rapid City Army Air Base
- Will Rogers Field
- Scottsbluff Army Air Field
- Scribner Army Air Field
- Sioux City Army Air Base
- Spokane International Airport
- Walker Army Air Field
- Walla Walla Army Air Field
- Watertown Army Air Field
- Wendover Field

Group Training Stations

- Ainsworth Regional Airport
- Bruning Army Air Field
- Moses Lake Army Air Base
- Scribner State Airport
- Strother Army Airfield
- Walla Walla Army Airfield

Replacement Training Stations

- Ainsworth Regional Airport
- Bruning Army Air Field
- Dyersburg Army Air Base
- Kearney Army Air Field
- Liberal Army Air Field
- Sioux City Army Air Base
- Walla Walla Army Airfield

== Sources ==
- R. Frank Futrell, “The Development of Base Facilities,” in The Army Air Forces in World War II, vol. 6, Men and Planes, ed. Wesley Frank Craven and James Lea Cate, 142 (Washington, D.C., Office of Air Force History, new imprint, 1983).
