= Airfields of the United States Army in Nebraska 1939-1945 =

Airfields of the United States Army in Nebraska, 1939-1945
- Part of United States Army

Site information
- Type: Army Airfields
- Controlled by: United States Army Air Forces

Location
- Map Of Nebraska World War II Army Airfields

Site history
- Built: 1940-1945
- In use: 1940-present

The United States Army Air Forces (USAAF) maintained a number of airfields in Nebraska from 1939-1945. They were training centers for pilots and aircrews of fighters and bombers during World War II. Nebraska was a favored location because it has excellent, year-round flying conditions. The sparsely populated land made ideal locations for gunnery, bombing, and training ranges.

As early as September 1940 President Franklin D. Roosevelt's Advisory Commission to the Council of National Defense gathered information on where to place army airfields in the midwestern states. The east and west coasts were thought vulnerable to potential attack, and the midwest was considered a safe place to put defense training sites, manufacturing facilities, and installations.

Through surveys conducted in 1940 and 1941, the USAAF found Nebraska ideal for training purposes. Meteorologists decided that the state had excellent year-round flying conditions. Additionally, Nebraska was lightly populated with large open areas which would provide numerous locations for gunnery, bombing and training ranges. The land was relatively inexpensive. The state was intersected with many reliable railroad lines which could transport troops and material to Airfields and training facilities. Nebraska also had a strong public utilities system, which meant that the United States military would need to deal with few facilities to obtain electricity for airfields and training facilities.

The majority of these airfields were located in rural farmland, near small farming towns. The effect of stationing thousands of airmen brought the reality of war to rural and small town Nebraska. In addition to providing training for servicemen, the air bases provided jobs for many civilians. Civilians were employed in maintenance, repair, and secretarial work.

Construction of these facilities was based on standardized plans and architectural drawings, with the buildings designed to be the "cheapest, temporary character with structural stability only sufficient to meet the needs of the service which the structure is intended to fulfill during the period of its contemplated war use." To conserve critical materials, most facilities were constructed of wood, concrete, brick, gypsum board and concrete asbestos. Metal was sparsely used. Each facility was designed to be nearly self-sufficient, with not only hangars, but barracks, mess halls, even hospitals and recreation centers

The training that was given to the airmen stationed at these airfields gave them the skills and knowledge that enabled them to enter combat in all theaters of warfare, and enabled the Allies to defeat Nazi Germany and Imperial Japan.

== Major airfields ==
Along with the existing Fort Crook/Offutt Army Airfield, the USAAF established eleven airfields (AAF), the majority of them being under the command of Second Air Force, headquartered in Colorado Springs, Colorado between 1942 and 1945. These were:

USAAF Name Current Name	Mission	Host Unit	Location	Coordinates	Notes
Ainsworth Army Airfield; Ainsworth Municipal Airport	B-17 Bomber Training; Single Engine Fighter Training	II Bomber Command; 4315th Army Air Force Base Unit	Ainsworth	42°34′45″N 099°59′35″W	Satellite field of Rapid City Army Air Base, South Dakota. Closed 1945.
Alliance Army Airfield; Alliance Municipal Airport	C-47 Training, Glider training; Flexible Gunnery School; Parachute Training	I Troop Carrier Command; 434th Troop Carrier Group	Alliance	42°03′12″N 102°48′14″W	In addition to the C-47s, the unit repaired B-17 Flying Fortress and B-24 Liberator aircraft from other airfields. Closed 1945.
Bruning Army Airfield	B-24 Bomber Training; Single Engine Fighter Training	II Bomber Command; 510th Army Air Force Base Unit	Bruning	40°20′25″N 097°25′42″W	Closed 1945. Operated as an airport until 1969. Now abandoned; currently in agricultural use and as a cattle feedlot
Fairmont Army Airfield; Fairmont State Airfield	B-24/B-29 Bomber training	II Bomber Command; 511th Army Air Force Base Unit	Fairmont	40°35′10″N 097°34′23″W	Closed 1945
Grand Island Army Airfield; Central Nebraska Regional Airport	B-29 Superfortress Bomber training	Second Air Force; 17th Bombardment Training Wing	Grand Island	40°58′03″N 098°18′35″W	Assigned to Strategic Air Command, March 1946. Closed October 1946. Became civil airport, however occasional use by Air Defense Command interceptors from Richards-Gebaur Air Force Base, Kansas City until ADC shut down fighter operations in 1968.
Harvard Army Airfield; Harvard State Airport	B-17/B-24/B-29 Bomber training	II Bomber Command; Second Air Force; 521st Army Air Force Base Unit (B-17/B-24); 17th Bombardment Training Wing (B-29)	Harvard	40°39′05″N 098°04′47″W	Closed May 1946.
Kearney Army Airfield; Kearney Air Force Base; Kearney Regional Airport	II Bomber Command; B-29 Bomber training SAC Fighter Escort Base	Army Air Forces Training Command; 4-Engine Flying School (B-17/B-24)	Kearney	40°43′37″N 099°00′24″W	B-29 training base during World War II; Strategic Air Command F-82 Twin Mustang Fighter base 1946; Closed March 1949.
Lincoln Army Airfield; Lincoln Air Force Base; Lincoln Air National Guard Base and Lincoln Airport	B-29 Bomber training SAC B-47 bomber & Atlas ICBM base NEANG KC-135 air refueling base	Army Air Forces Training Command, Western Technical Training Command; SAC 98th Bombardment Wing; NEANG 155th Air Refueling Wing.	Lincoln	40°51′04″N 096°45′33″W	Inactivated by AAFTC 1946. Used by Nebraska ANG afterwards, also by United States Navy as Naval Air Station Lincoln. Reactivated as Lincoln AFB, 1952-1966; partly reverted to Lincoln ANGB, 1966–Present. Has been active as a military base since 1941. Joint-use civil airport/military air base since 1952.
McCook Army Airfield	B-17/B-24/B-29 Bomber training	II Bomber Command; Second Air Force; 520th Operational Training Unit (B-17/B-24); 17th Bombardment Training Wing (B-29)	McCook	40°18′25″N 100°42′07″W	Closed December 1945. Now farmland, abandoned.
Scottsbluff Army Airfield; Western Nebraska Regional Airport	B-17 Bomber training C-47 Training	II Bomber Command; 4190th Army Air Force Base Unit; I Troop Carrier Command	Scottsbluff	41°52′26″N 103°35′44″W	B-17 heavy bomber training, 1941–1944; C-47 training 1944-1945. Glider crews. Aircraft and radio maintenance personnel also trained here. Became sub-base of Alliance AAF under I Troop Carrier Command. Closed December 1945.
Scribner Army Airfield; Scribner State Airport	B-17/B-24 Bomber training; Single engine fighter training	II Bomber Command; 4316th Army Air Force Base Unit	Scribner	41°36′37″N 096°37′48″W	Closed December 1945

Currently, of the World War II Army Airfields in Nebraska, six are municipal airports (Ainsworth, Alliance, Scottsbluff, Lincoln, Kearney, Grand Island), four are owned by the Nebraska Department of Aeronautics (three, Harvard, Fairmont and Scribner, are operated as state airfields, and one, Bruning, is not), one is privately owned (McCook) and one became Offutt Air Force Base. Lincoln Airport also hosts a Nebraska Air National Guard unit.
