= Len Supulski =

American football player (1920–1943)

Profile
- Position: End

Personal information
- Born: December 15, 1920; Kingston, Pennsylvania, U.S.
- Died: August 31, 1943 (aged 22); Kearney, Nebraska, U.S.

Career information
- College: Dickinson

Career history
- 1942: Philadelphia Eagles

Awards and highlights
- Dickinson Hall of Fame
- Stats at Pro Football Reference

Other information
- Military career
- Allegiance: United States
- Branch: U.S. Army Air Corps
- Service years: 1942–1943
- Rank: First Lieutenant
- Conflicts: World War II

Leonard Peter Supulski (December 15, 1920 – August 31, 1943) was an American football end in the National Football League (NFL) for the Philadelphia Eagles.

== Early life ==
Supulski was born in Kingston, Pennsylvania, and attended Kingston High School. He was one of the 12 children of a Lithuanian father and mother of Lithuanian descent.

== Football career ==
Supulski attended and played college football at Dickinson College, but failed to graduate. He caught 48 for 586 yards in 1941, a school record that stood until 1984, and was a United Press International All-Eastern first-team choice. In 1942, Supulski played in six games for the Philadelphia Eagles of the National Football League, scoring on a 41-yard touchdown reception in the season opener against the Pittsburgh Steelers.

Supulski was inducted into the Dickinson Hall of Fame in 1981.

== Military career and death ==
At the end of the 1942 season, Supulski entered the United States Army Air Forces. After completing flight navigator training, he received his pilot qualifications on July 24, 1943. He reported to the 582nd Bomb Squadron for advanced training at Kearney Air Force Base in Nebraska to prepare for service in World War II.

On August 31, Supulski was killed along with seven others in the crash of a Boeing B-17 Flying Fortress bomber near Kearney, Nebraska, during a training flight after the aircraft caught fire and exploded upon impact with the ground.

Four of his brothers were also in the military: Edward was also in the Army Air Forces, while Raymond was part of the Navy, and Ernest and Sam served with the Army.
