= Alliance Airport =

Alliance Airport may refer to:

- Alliance Municipal Airport, a municipal airport in Box Butte County, Nebraska, near the city of Alliance.
- Perot Field Fort Worth Alliance Airport, the major airport in the Dallas-Fort Worth metroplex
