= KCDR =

KCDR may refer to:

- Chadron Municipal Airport (ICAO code KCDR)
- KCDR-LP, a low-power radio station (94.3 FM) licensed to serve Austin, Texas, United States
- KCDR-LD, a defunct low-power television station (channel 45) formerly licensed to serve Cedar Rapids, Iowa, United States
