= 380th Air Refueling Squadron =

Inactive US Air Force unit

380th Air Refueling Squadron

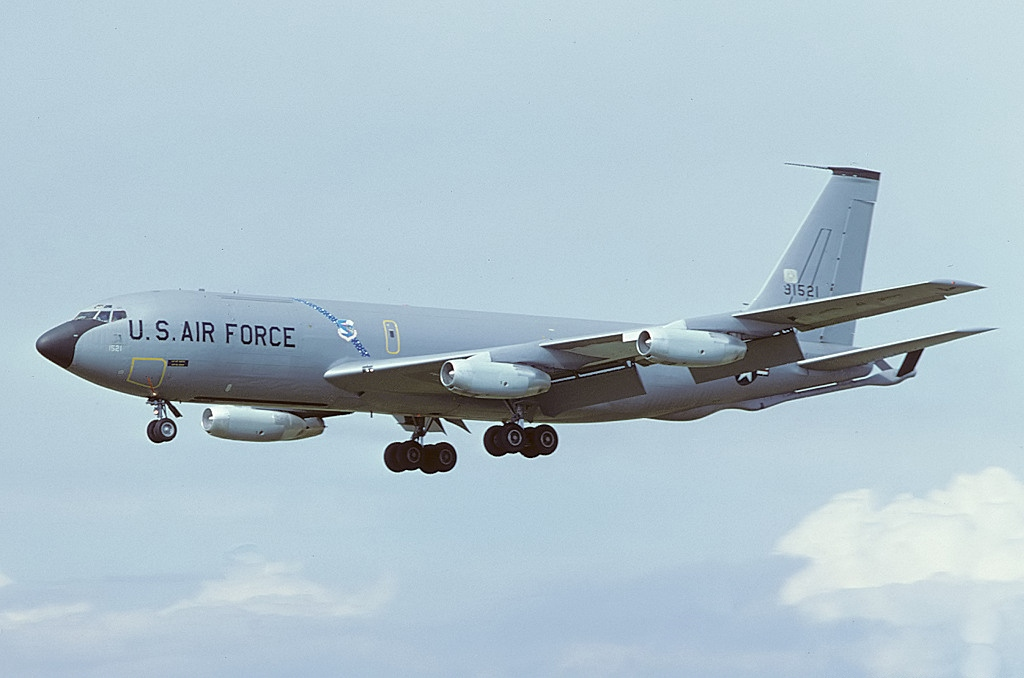
- KC-135A with Strategic Air Command markings (Note: Aircraft is KC-135A-BN, serial 59-1521. It was later converted to a KC-135R. Baugher, Joe (24 February 2023). "1959 USAF Serial Numbers". Joe Baugher.)
- Active: 1943–1944: 1956–1994
- Country: United States
- Branch: United States Air Force
- Role: Aerial refueling
- Decorations: Air Force Outstanding Unit Award

Insignia
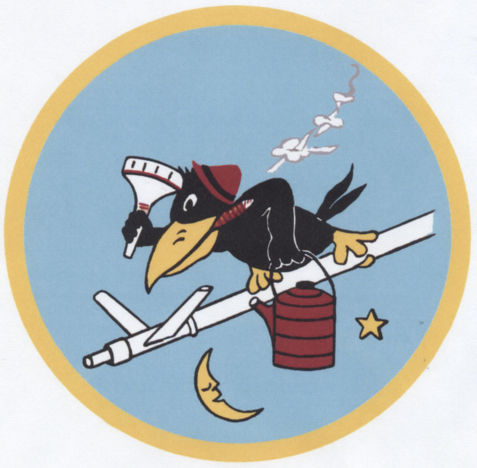
- 380th Air Refueling Squadron Emblem

The 380th Air Refueling Squadron is an inactive United States Air Force unit. It was last assigned to the 380th Bombardment Wing at Plattsburgh Air Force Base, New York where it was inactivated on 30 September 1995.

The squadron's first predecessor was active during World War II as the 580th Bombardment Squadron, which served as an Operational Training Unit and Replacement Training Unit during World War II until 1944, when it was inactivated in a reorganization of Army Air Forces training units.

The 380th Air Refueling Squadron was activated at Lincoln Air Force Base, Nebraska in November 1954. In 1956 it moved to Plattsburgh where it served with Boeing KC-97 Stratofreighter and Boeing KC-135 Stratotanker aircraft until inactivating. In September 1985, the two squadrons were consolidated into a single unit.

== History ==
=== World War II ===
The earliest predecessor of the squadron was the 580th Bombardment Squadron, which was activated at Geiger Field, Washington, in February early 1943 as one of the original squadrons of the 393rd Bombardment Group. In March, the squadron moved to Gowen Field, Idaho and began to equip with Boeing B-17 Flying Fortresses to act as an Operational Training Unit (OTU). The OTU program involved the use of an oversized parent unit to provide cadres to "satellite groups". The OTU program was patterned after the unit training system of the Royal Air Force. It assumed responsibility for unit training and oversaw their expansion with graduates of Army Air Forces Training Command schools to become effective combat units. Phase I training concentrated on individual training in crewmember specialties. Phase II training emphasized the coordination for the crew to act as a team. The final phase concentrated on operation as a unit. The squadron was at Gowen for a month before moving to Wendover Field, Utah.

The 393rd Group moved to Sioux City Army Air Base, Iowa in June 1943, but only the 582nd Squadron remained there with group headquarters. On 4 July, the 580th relocated to Watertown Army Air Field, South Dakota.

On 1 August 1943, the group moved to Kearney Army Air Field, Nebraska, where it was joined by the 580th Squadrons, which changed its mission to a Replacement Training Unit (RTU). By 1943 most combat units had been activated and almost three quarters of them had deployed overseas. With the exception of special programs, like forming Boeing B-29 Superfortress units, training "fillers" for existing units became more important than unit training. RTUs were oversized units like OTUs, but their mission was to train individual pilots or aircrews.

In November 1943, the group returned to Sioux City. However, The Army Air Forces (AAF) was finding that standard military units like the 580th, whose manning was based on relatively inflexible tables of organization were proving not well adapted to the training mission, even more so to the replacement mission. Accordingly, the AAF adopted a more functional system in which each base was organized into a separate numbered unit. As a result, the 580th, along with the other components of the 393rd Group, were inactivated and their personnel and equipment were combined with those of support units at Sioux City into the 224th AAF Base Unit (Combat Crew Training Station, Bombardment, Heavy), which assumed the base's training mission.

=== Strategic Air Command refueling operations ===
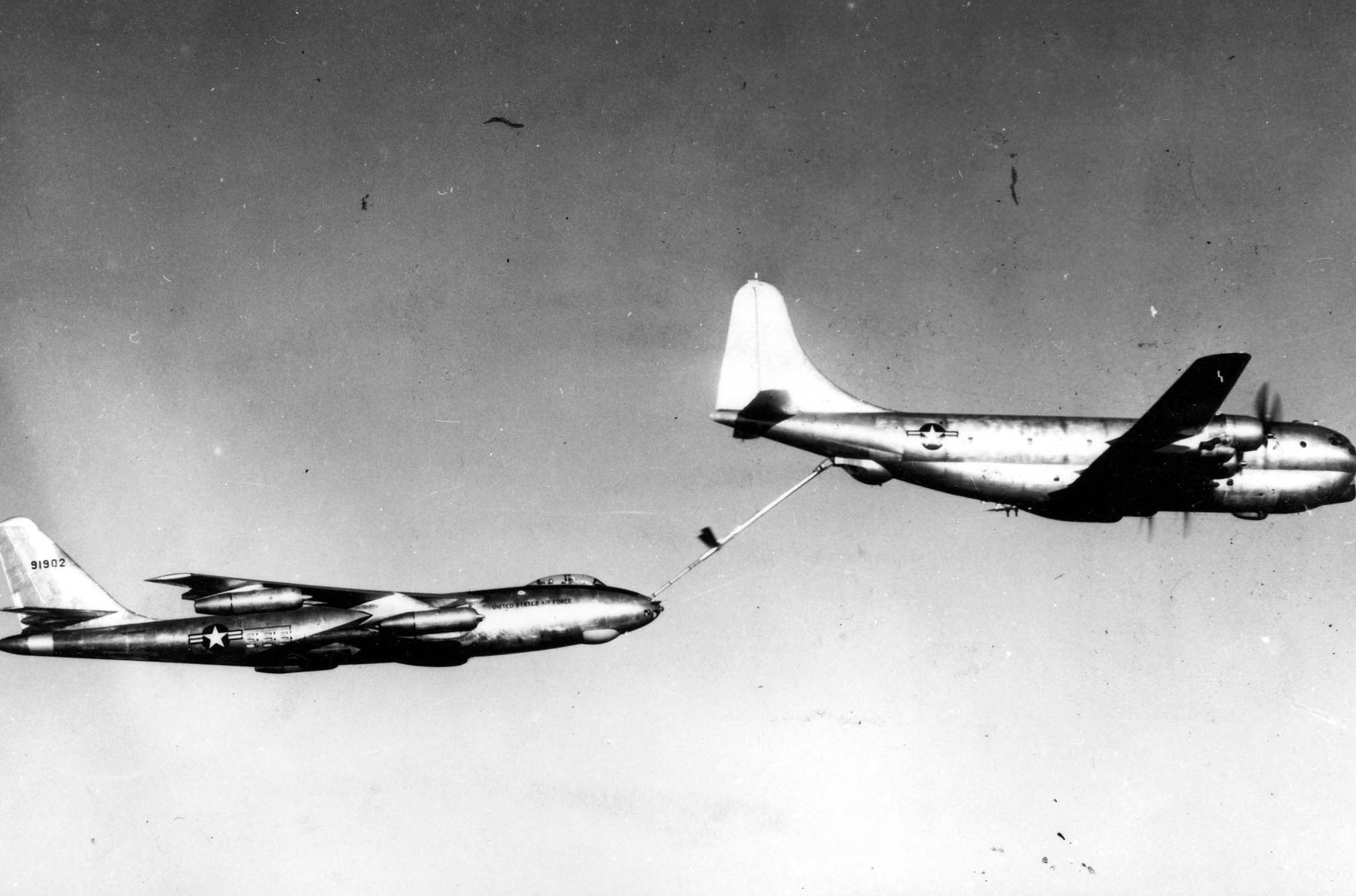
KC-97 refueling B-47 Stratojet

The 380th Air Refueling Squadron was first activated in the summer of 1954 at Lincoln Air Force Base, Nebraska. It moved to Plattsburgh Air Force Base, New York in 1956 with Boeing KC-97 Stratofreighters providing air refueling to SAC B-47s and other USAF aircraft as directed. It converted to jet-powered Boeing KC-135 Stratotankers in 1964. In 1985 the two squadrons were consolidated. The squadron deployed aircraft and personnel to forward SAC units in the Western Pacific during the Vietnam War.

During the summer of 1988, aircrew from both the 380th and the 310th Air Refueling Squadrons of the 380th Bombardment Wing deployed for the first time since World War II to Hunter Army Airfield, Georgia. For this deployment over 300 men and women deployed to their forward operating base in support of Mighty Warrior 1988, a SAC wide exercise held to prepare and demonstrate the various SAC wings' ability to carry out their respective missions under austere conditions.

The unit deployed aircraft and personnel to the 1703d Air Refueling Wing, Provisional at King Khalid International Airport, Riyadh, Saudi Arabia between September 1990 and March 1991 during Operation Desert Shield and Operation Desert Storm. The squadron remained on duty until shutdown of Plattsburgh and inactivation of its parent 380th Bombardment Wing in 1994.

== Lineage ==
580th Bombardment Squadron

- Constituted as the 580th Bombardment Squadron (Light) on 29 January 1943

Activated on 16 February 1943

- Inactivated on 1 April 1944
- Consolidated with the 380th Air Refueling Squadron as the 380th Air Refueling Squadron on 19 September 1985

380th Air Refueling Squadron

- Constituted on 5 May 1954 as the 380th Air Refueling Squadron, Medium

Activated on 8 July 1954
Redesignated 380th Air Refueling Squadron, Heavy on 1 July 1964

- Consolidated with the 580th Bombardment Squadron on 19 September 1985

Redesignated 380th Air Refueling Squadron on 1 September 1991
Inactivated on 1 October 1994

=== Assignments ===
- 393d Bombardment Group: 16 February 1943 – 1 April 1944
- Fifteenth Air Force: 8 July 1964 (attached to 98th Air Base Group)
- 98th Bombardment Wing: 1 August 1954
- Eighth Air Force: 8 November 1954 (attached to 96th Bombardment Wing)
- Second Air Force: 1 April 1955
- 380th Bombardment Wing: 16 August 1956
- 4108th Air Refueling Wing: 1 April 1961
- 497th Air Refueling Wing, 1 January 1963
- 380th Bombardment Wing: 15 September 1964
- 380th Operations Group: 1 September 1991 – 1 October 1994

=== Stations ===
- Geiger Field, Washington, 26 January 1943
- Gowen Field, Idaho, 3 March 1943
- Wendover Field, Utah, 3 April 1943
- Sioux City Army Air Base. 9 June 1943
- Watertown Army Air Field, South Dakota, 4 July 1943
- Kearney Army Air Field, Nebraska, 1 August 1943
- Sioux City Army Air Base, Iowa, c. 5 November 1943 – 1 April 1944
- Lincoln Air Force Base, Nebraska, 8 November 1954
- Sheppard Air Force Base, Texas, 8 November 1954
- Plattsburgh Air Force Base, New York, 16 August 1956 – 1 October 1994

=== Aircraft ===
- Boeing B-17 Flying Fortress, 1943–1944
- Boeing KC-97 Stratofreighter, 1956–1964
- Boeing KC-135 Stratotanker, 1964–1995

=== Commanders ===
- Lt Col John Gentry, 1986-1988
- Lt Col Paul Gutman, 1989-1990
- Lt Col Ken Mills, 1990-1992

=== Awards and campaigns ===
Award streamer	Award	Dates	Notes
	Air Force Outstanding Unit Award	1 July 1974-30 June 1975	380th Air Refueling Squadron
	Air Force Outstanding Unit Award	1 July 1979-30 June 1981	380th Air Refueling Squadron
	Air Force Outstanding Unit Award	1 July 1983-30 June 1985	380th Air Refueling Squadron
	Air Force Outstanding Unit Award	1 July 1985-30 June 1986	380th Air Refueling Squadron
	Air Force Outstanding Unit Award	1 July 1988-30 June 1990	380th Air Refueling Squadron

Service Streamer	Theater	Dates	Notes
	American Theater	16 February 1943 – 1 April 1944	580th Bombardment Squadron
