= 17th Air Division =

- Active: (Note: 1940–1941)
- Country: United States
- Branch: United States Air Force

Commanders
- Notable commanders: Frank A. Armstrong

Insignia
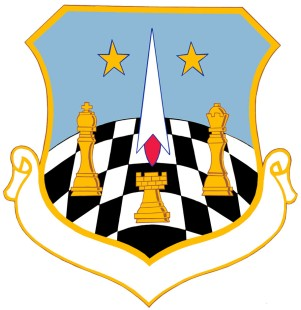
- 17th Air Division emblem (Note: Approved 28 April 1964.)

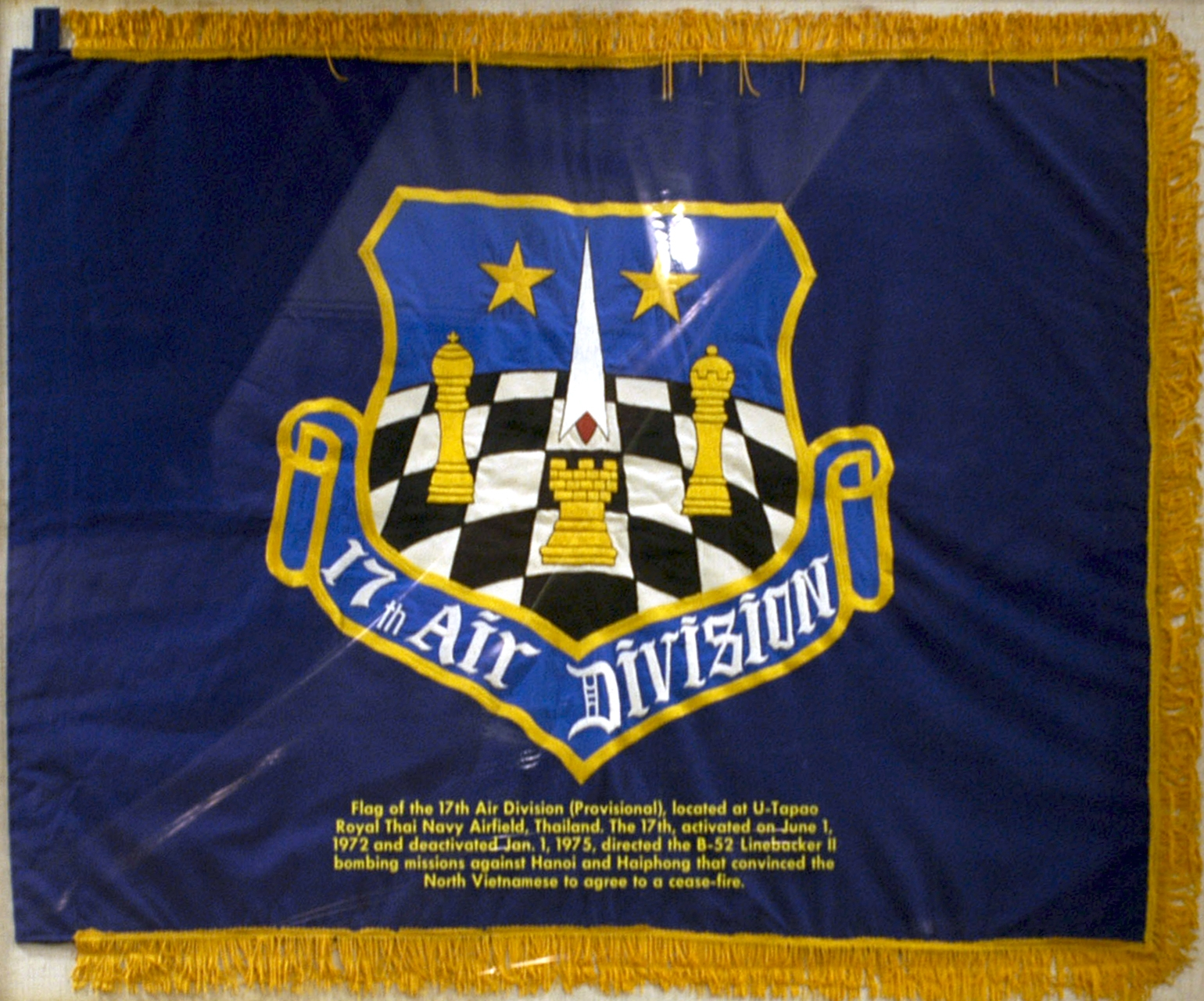
Flag of the 17th Air Division

The 17th Air Division is an inactive United States Air Force unit. Its last assignment was with Pacific Air Forces, stationed at U-Tapao Royal Thai Navy Airfield, Thailand, where it was inactivated on 1 January 1976.

== History ==
The air division was first activated as the 17th Bombardment Wing on 18 December 1940, and assigned to the Southeast Air District. It was assigned the 3d and 27th Bombardment Groups as its operational units, and the 22d Pursuit Wing was attached from January to June 1942. In September 1941, the wing was inactivated and its personnel used to form the 3d Air Support Command.

Reactivated as part of Second Air Force in June 1942 as the 17th Bombardment Training Wing. Was the primary training command organization for USAAF heavy bombardment (Boeing B-17 Flying Fortress and Consolidated B-24 Liberator) groups during World War II from June 1942 until May 1944. Initially, it controlled the third phase of training, in which each bombardment group split into tactical components and operated from squadron sized airfields under simulated combat conditions. Later, the 17th supervised the first and second phases of heavy bombardment group and crew training.

In 1943 assumed mission for training Boeing B-29 Superfortress Very Heavy bombardment groups prior to their deployment to Twentieth Air Force in the Pacific Theater until April 1946 when it ceased all activity. It also exercised limited supervision over the training of the XXI and XXII Bomber Commands during 1944.

=== Strategic Air Command ===
The disbanded wing was reconstituted and redesignated the 17th Air Division and activated on 15 July 1959. It gained control of the 340th and the 305th Bombardment Wings at Bunker Hill Air Force Base, Indiana, and the 4040th Air Base Squadron at Richard I. Bong Air Force Base, Wisconsin in 1959. The two bombardment wings flew normal Strategic Air Command alert patrols and participated in special exercises as required. The division lost its bombardment wings and gained missile wings in 1963, assuming responsibility for Titan and Minuteman missiles in Missouri, Kansas, and later Arkansas. When joined by the 70th Bombardment Wing, on 1 July 1965 with Boeing B-52 Stratofortress and Boeing KC-135 Stratotanker aircraft, the division reverted to an earlier designation – 17th Strategic Aerospace Division. From 1965 to 1971, the division's units frequently deployed bomber and tanker resources. Operation Arc Light operations in Southeast Asia, consisting of military operations against enemy forces in Vietnam, drew most of the deployments.

=== Pacific Air Forces ===
From 1 July 1975 to 1 January 1976 as part of Pacific Air Forces, it supervised training for United States Air Force tactical units in Thailand. It was inactivated as part of the USAF withdrawal from Thailand after the end of the Vietnam War.

== Lineage ==
- Constituted as the 17th Bombardment Wing on 3 October 1940

Activated on 18 December 1940
Inactivated on 1 September 1941

- Activated on 23 June 1942

Redesignated 17th Bombardment Training Wing in January 1943
Redesignated 17th Bombardment Operational Training Wing in April 1943
Inactivated on 15 November 1943

- Redesignated 17th Bombardment Operational Training Wing (Very Heavy)

Activated on 11 March 1944
Inactivated on 9 April 1946
Disbanded on 8 October 1948

- Reconstituted and redesignated 17th Air Division on 1 July 1959

Activated on 15 July 1959
Redesignated 17th Strategic Aerospace Division on 15 February 1962
Redesignated 17th Strategic Missile Division on 1 September 1963
Redesignated 17th Strategic Aerospace Division on 1 July 1965
Inactivated on 30 June 1971

- Redesignated 17th Air Division on 24 January 1975

Activated on 1 July 1975
Inactivated on 1 January 1976

=== Assignments ===
- GHQ Air Force, 18 December 1940
- Southeast Air District (later, Third Air Force), 16 January 1941 – 1 September 1941 (attached to III Bomber Command, 23 April – 1 September 1941)
- Second Air Force, 23 June 1942
- II Bomber Command, 15 May 1943
- Second Air Force, 6 October – 15 November 1943; 11 March 1944
- Fifteenth Air Force, 31 March – 9 April 1946
- Second Air Force, 15 July 1959
- Eighth Air Force, 1 July 1963
- Fifteenth Air Force, 31 March 1970 – 30 June 1971
- Pacific Air Forces, 1 July 1975 – 1 January 1976

=== Components ===
==== Commands ====
- XXI Bomber Command: attached c. 15 April – 20 October 1944
- XXII Bomber Command: attached 14 August 1944 – 13 February 1945

==== Wings ====
- 13th Bombardment Wing: attached 17 August – 17 October 1945
- 20th Bombardment Wing: attached c. 15 August 1945 – January 1946
- 22d Pursuit Wing: attached 16 January – c. 16 June 1941
- 41st Bombardment Wing: attached 17 March – 4 July 1943
- 47th Bombardment Wing: attached c. 15 August 1945 – January 1946
- 70th Bombardment Wing: 1 July 1965 – 31 December 1969
- 72d Bombardment Operational Training Wing: attached 20 August – c. 6 October 1943
- 73d Bombardment Wing: attached c. 15 April – 17 July 1944
- 96th Bombardment Wing: attached 16 August – 17 October 1945
- 305th Bombardment Wing: 15 July 1959 – 1 January 1961
- 308th Strategic Missile Wing: 31 March 1970 – 30 June 1971
- 313th Bombardment Wing: attached 23 April – 5 November 1944
- 314th Bombardment Wing: attached 23 April – 9 December 1944
- 315th Bombardment Wing: attached 17 July 1944 – June 1945
- 316th Bombardment Wing: attached 14 August 1944 – 7 July 1945
- 340th Bombardment Wing: 15 July 1959 – 1 September 1963
- 351st Strategic Missile Wing: 1 February 1963 – 30 June 1971
- 381st Strategic Missile Wing: 1 July 1963 – 30 June 1971
- 500th Air Refueling Wing: 1 January – 1 July 1963
- 4045th Air Refueling Wing: 9 September 1960 – 1 January 1963
- 432lst Strategic Wing: 1 October 1959 – 15 August 1962

==== Groups ====
- 2d Bombardment Group: attached 2 November 1942 13 March 1943
- 3d Bombardment Group: 18 December 1940 – 1 September 1941
- 6th Bombardment Group: attached 5 May – 18 November 1944
- 9th Bombardment Group: attached 5 May – 18 November 1944
- 16th Bombardment Group: attached 5 May 1944 – June 1945
- 19th Bombardment Group: attached c. 15 April – 7 December 1944
- 27th Bombardment Group: 18 December 1940 – 1 September 1941
- 29th Bombardment Group: attached c. 15 April – 7 December 1944
- 34th Bombardment Group: attached 2 November – 14 December 1942
- 39th Bombardment Group: attached c. 15 April 1944 – 8 January 1945
- 44th Bombardment Group: attached 24 July 1945 – 30 March 1946
- 45th Bombardment Group: attached 15 January – 17 June 1941
- 46th Bombardment Group: attached 15 January – 19 May 1941
- 48th Bombardment Group: attached 15 January – 21 May 1941
- 56th Pursuit Group: attached 15 January – 16 May 1941
- 88th Bombardment Group: attached c. 1 November 1942 – November 1943
- 91st Bombardment Group: attached c. 26 June – 24 August 1942
- 93d Bombardment Group: attached 24 July 1945 – 30 March 1946
- 95th Bombardment Group: attached 2 November 1942 – 18 April 1943
- 96th Bombardment Group: attached 28 September – 30 October 1942
- 98th Bombardment Group: attached c. 6 May – 10 November 1945
- 99th Bombardment Group: attached 2 – c. 16 November 1942
- 100th Bombardment Group: attached 2 – c. 29 November 1942
- 302d Bombardment Group: attached 1–30 September 1942
- 303d Bombardment Group: attached 1 – c. 23 August 1942
- 304th Bombardment Group: attached 2 November – c. December 1942
- 305th Bombardment Group: attached 1–31 August 1942
- 306th Bombardment Group: attached 1 July – 1 August 1942
- 307th Bombardment Group: attached 30 September – 20 October 1942
- 330th Bombardment Group: c. 15 April 1944 – 7 January 1945
- 331st Bombardment Group: attached 12 July 1944 – July 1945
- 333d Bombardment Group: attached 1 September – 1 November 1942; 7 July 1944 – August 1945
- 346th Bombardment Group: attached 18 August 1944 – September 1945
- 351st Bombardment Group: attached November – December 1942
- 376th Bombardment Group: attached 8 May – 10 November 1945
- 379th Bombardment Group: attached 3 – c. 18 November 1942
- 381st Bombardment Group: attached c. 1 December 1942 – c. 2 January 1943
- 382d Bombardment Group: attached 25 August 1944 – September 1945
- 383d Bombardment Group: attached 12 November 1942 – c. 25 October 1943; 28 August 1944 – September 1945
- 385th Bombardment Group: attached 1 February – June 1943
- 390th Bombardment Group: attached 26 January – 4 July 1943
- 393d Bombardment Group: attached 16 February – c. 2 March 1943
- 395th Bombardment Group: attached 16 February – c. 24 October 1943
- 396th Bombardment Group: attached 10 April – c. 4 November 1943
- 398th Bombardment Group: attached 1 March – c. 4 April 1943; 29 April – November 1943
- 401st Bombardment Group: attached 1 April – 1 October 1943
- 447th Bombardment Group: attached 1 May – November 1943
- 448th Bombardment Group: attached 11 September – November 1943; 25 July 1945 – c. 30 March 1946
- 449th Bombardment Group: attached 24 July 1945 – c. 30 March 1946
- 450th Bombardment Group: attached c. 26 July – 15 October 1945
- 452d Bombardment Group: attached 1 June – November 1943
- 456th Bombardment Group: attached 17 August – 17 October 1945
- 457th Bombardment Group: attached 1 July – November 1943
- 458th Bombardment Group: 25 July – c. 20 August 1945
- 463d Bombardment Group: attached 1 August – c. 4 November 1943
- 466th Bombardment Group: attached 25 July – c. 14 August 1945
- 467th Bombardment Group: attached 25 July 1945 – c. 30 March 1946
- 483d Bombardment Group: attached 20 September – c. 5 November 1943
- 484th Bombardment Group: attached 20 September – November 1943
- 485th Bombardment Group: attached 24 July 1945 – 30 March 1946
- 488th Bombardment Group: attached 1 October – c. 31 October 1943
- 489th Bombardment Group: attached c. 28 February – c. 2 April 1945; c. 10 July – September 1945
- 497th Bombardment Group: attached c. 15 April – 18 July 1944
- 498th Bombardment Group: attached c. 15 April – 13 July 1944
- 499th Bombardment Group: attached c. 15 April – 22 July 1944
- 500th Bombardment Group: attached 16 April – 23 July 1944
- 501st Bombardment Group: attached 1 June 1944 – June 1945
- 502d Bombardment Group: attached 5 June 1944 – July 1945
- 504th Bombardment Group: attached c. 15 April – 5 November 1944
- 505th Bombardment Group: attached c. 15 April – 6 November 1944

=== Stations ===
- Hunter Army Air Field, Georgia, 18 December 1940 – 1 September 1941
- Rapid City Army Air Base, South Dakota, 23 June 1942
- Walla Walla Army Air Field, Washington, c. 1 July – 15 November 1943
- Smoky Hill Army Air Field, Kansas, 11 March 1944
- Colorado Springs Army Air Base, Colorado, April 1944
- Grand Island Army Air Field, Nebraska, May 1944
- Sioux City Army Air Base, Iowa, February 1945
- Fort Worth Army Air Field, Texas, December 1945 – 9 April 1946
- Whiteman Air Force Base, Missouri, 15 July 1959 – 30 June 1971
- U-Tapao Royal Thai Navy Airfield, Thailand, 1 July 1975 – 1 January 1976

== See also ==
- List of United States Air Force air divisions
