= Chadron Municipal Airport =

Airport in Nebraska, United States

- IATA: CDR; ICAO: KCDR; FAA LID: CDR

Summary
- Airport type: Public
- Owner: City of Chadron
- Serves: Chadron, Nebraska
- Elevation AMSL: 3,298 ft (1,005 m)
- Coordinates: 42°50′15″N 103°05′43″W
- Website: CDR Website

Map
- Location within Nebraska Location within the United States

Runways
Direction	Length		Surface
Direction	ft	m	Surface
3/21	5,998	1,828	Concrete
12/30	4,400	1,341	Concrete

Statistics
- Aircraft operations (2020): 7,665
- Based aircraft (2022): 12
- Source: Federal Aviation Administration

Chadron Municipal Airport (IATA: CDR, ICAO: KCDR, FAA LID: CDR) is in Dawes County, Nebraska, United States, five miles west of Chadron. It sees one airline, Southern Airways Express, subsidized by the Essential Air Service program.

== Facilities ==
Chadron Municipal Airport covers 716 acres (290 ha) at an elevation of 3,298 feet (1,005 m). It has two concrete runways: 3/21 is 5,998 by 100 feet (1,828 x 30 m) and 12/30 is 4,400 by 75 feet (1,341 x 23 m).

In the year ending June 22, 2020 the airport had 7,665 aircraft operations, an average of 21 per day: 69% general aviation, 16% airline, 9% air taxi and 6% military. In March 2022, there were 12 aircraft based at this airport: all 12 single-engine.

== Airline and destination ==
Airlines	Destinations
Denver Air Connection	Denver

=== Historical airline service ===
The first airline flights were Western DC-3s in 1956; Frontier replaced Western in early 1959. The last Frontier Twin Otter left in 1980. Great Lakes Airlines flew to Denver International Airport, connecting to United Airlines and Frontier Airlines, which both had codeshare agreements with Great Lakes. Boutique Air took over Great Lakes' service beginning July 15, 2015.

== Statistics ==
Passenger boardings (enplanements) by year, as per the FAA
Year	2009	2010	2011	2012	2013	2014	2015	2016	2017	2018	2019
Enplanements	1,875	1,769	1,980	2,037	2,244	777	1,715	4,474	5,532	5,218	4,233
Change	▼12.87%	▼5.65%	▲11.93%	▲2.88%	▲10.16%	▼65.37%	▲120.72%	▲160.87%	▲23.65%	▼5.68%	▼18.88%
Airline	Great Lakes Airlines	Great Lakes Airlines	Great Lakes Airlines	Great Lakes Airlines	Great Lakes Airlines	Great Lakes Airlines	Boutique Air	Boutique Air	Boutique Air	Boutique Air	Boutique Air
Destination(s)	Alliance Denver Sidney	Denver Williston	Denver Williston	Denver Scottsbluff	Denver Scottsbluff	Denver Scottsbluff	Denver	Alliance Denver	Alliance Denver	Alliance Denver	Denver

== Accidents and incidents ==
- On June 12, 2013, a general aviation aircraft crashed during takeoff. The pilot had minor injuries, and the FAA was notified and sent investigators from the FAA in Rapid City.

== See also ==
- List of airports in Nebraska
