= Flatiron Building (San Francisco) =

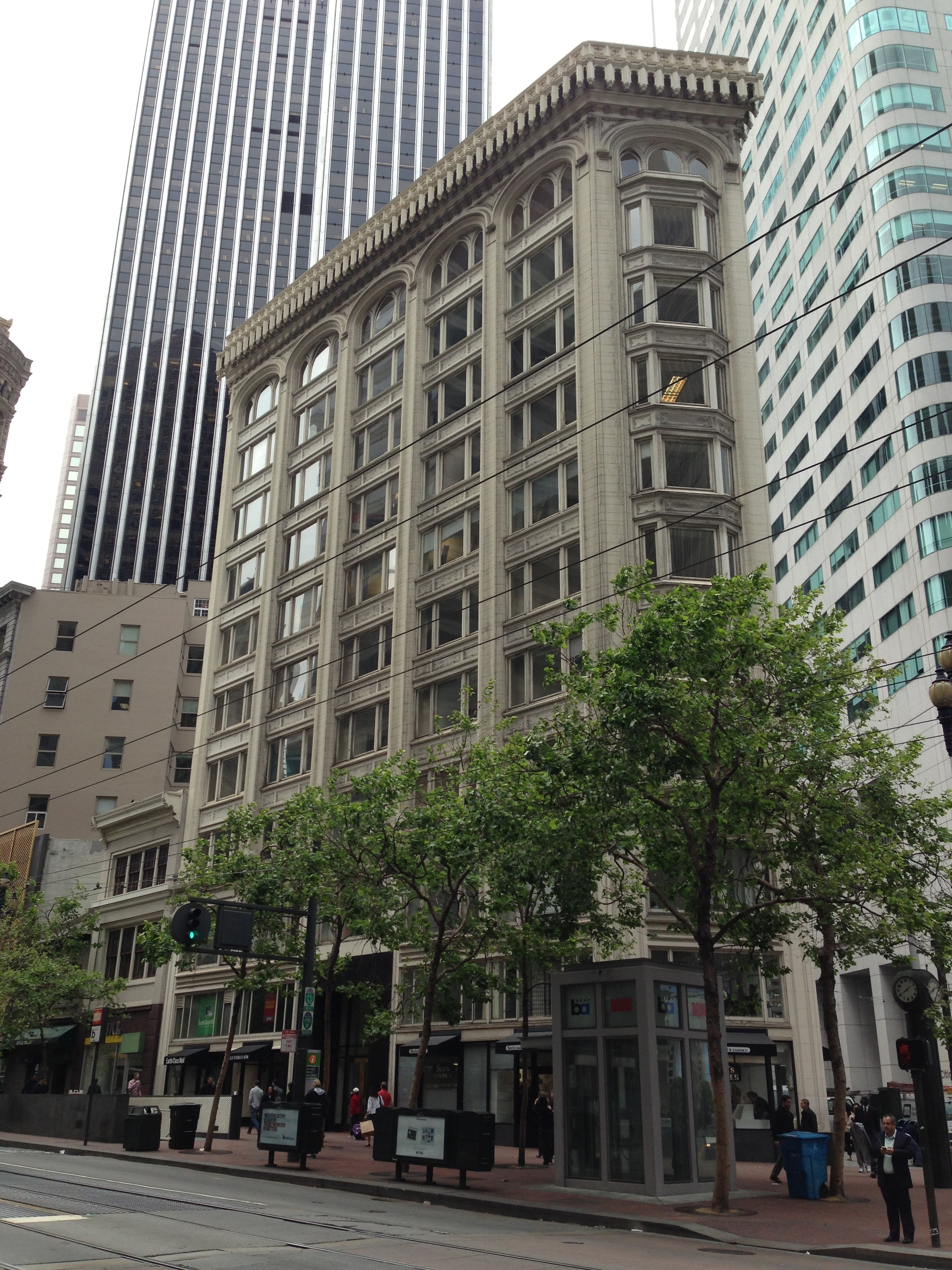

- Location within San Francisco County Location within California Location within the United States

General information
- Type: Commercial offices
- Location: 540 Market Street; San Francisco, California
- Coordinates: 37.7900°N 122.4007°W
- Completed: 1913
- Owner: Flatiron Building LLC

Height
- Roof: 36.58 m (120.0 ft)

Technical details
- Floor count: 10
- Floor area: 37,500 sq ft (3,480 m^{2})

Design and construction
- Architects: Havens & Toepke

San Francisco Designated Landmark
- Designated: 1982
- Reference no.: 155

The Flatiron Building is a highrise building completed in 1913 at 540 Market Street and Sutter Street in the Financial District of San Francisco. The 10-story, 120-foot (37 m) structure is designated as landmark No. 155.

Jimdo has offices in the building, as does Origami. Boutique Air had its headquarters there. The building was featured in the opening credits of the 1980s detective series Crazy Like a Fox since lead character Harry Fox had his offices in the building.

== See also ==
- List of San Francisco Designated Landmarks
- List of tallest buildings in San Francisco
