= 72nd Fighter Wing =

72d Fighter Wing
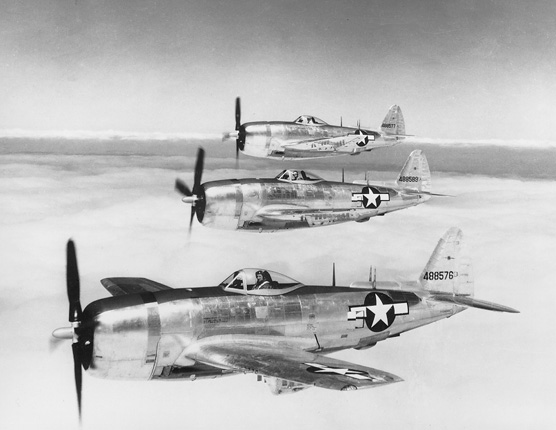
- P-47 Thunderbolts as flown by the wing
- Active: 1943–1946
- Country: United States
- Branch: United States Air Force
- Role: Command of Fighter operational and replacement training units

The 72d Fighter Wing was a wing of the United States Army Air Forces. It was assigned to Second Air Force, stationed at Colorado Springs Army Air Base, Colorado. It was inactivated on 9 April 1946.

== History ==
The wing was initially activated in August 1943 as the 72d Bombardment Operational Training Wing, a command organization for heavy bomber training. Ten days after activation, it was redesignated the 72d Fighter Wing and became single-engine fighter training organization for Second Air Force. The wing had jurisdiction over fighter Operational Training Unit and Replacement Training Unit in the midwest.

Stations assigned to the wing included:

- Abilene Army Air Field, Texas
- Alamogordo Army Air Field, New Mexico
- Bruning Army Air Field, Nebraska
- Casper Army Air Field, Wyoming
- Dalhart Army Air Field, Texas
- DeRidder Army Air Base, Louisiana
- Galveston Army Air Field, Texas
- Harding Field, Louisiana
- Peterson Field, Colorado
- Pocatello Army Air Field, Idaho
- Scribner Army Air Field, Nebraska

== Lineage ==
- Constituted as 72d Bombardment Operational Training Wing (Heavy) on 12 August 1943

Activated on 20 August 1943
Redesigned 72d Fighter Wing on 1 September 1943
Inactivated on 9 April 1946

- Disbanded on 15 June 1983
- Reconstituted on 31 July 1985 and redesigned 372d Electronic Warfare Group
- Disbanded on 9 September 1992

=== Assignments ===
- Second Air Force, 12 August 1943 – 9 April 1946

=== Components ===
- 36th Fighter Group, 17 September 1943 – 4 April 1944
- 84th Fighter Group, 1 November 1943 – 1 April 1944
- 357th Fighter Group, 7 October – 9 November 1943
- 407th Fighter Group, 9 March 1943 – 21 March 1944
- 408th Fighter Group, 1 November 1943 – 1 April 1944
- 476th Fighter Group, 26 March – 1 April 1944
- 507th Fighter Group, 12 October 1944 – 24 June 1945
- 508th Fighter Group, 12 October 1944 – 6 January 1945

=== Stations ===
- Rapid City Army Air Base, South Dakota, 20 August 1943
- Colorado Springs Army Air Base, Colorado, 7 October 1943
- Peterson Field, Colorado, November 1943
- Colorado Springs Army Air Base, Colorado, December 1945 – 9 April 1946

=== Aircraft ===
- Republic P-47 Thunderbolt, 1943 – 1944

=== Campaign ===
Campaign Streamer	Campaign	Dates	Notes
	American Theater without inscription	20 August 1943–2 March 1946	72md Bombardment Operational Training Wing (later 72nd Fighter Wing)
