= Bruning Army Air Field =

Former airport in Nebraska, United States

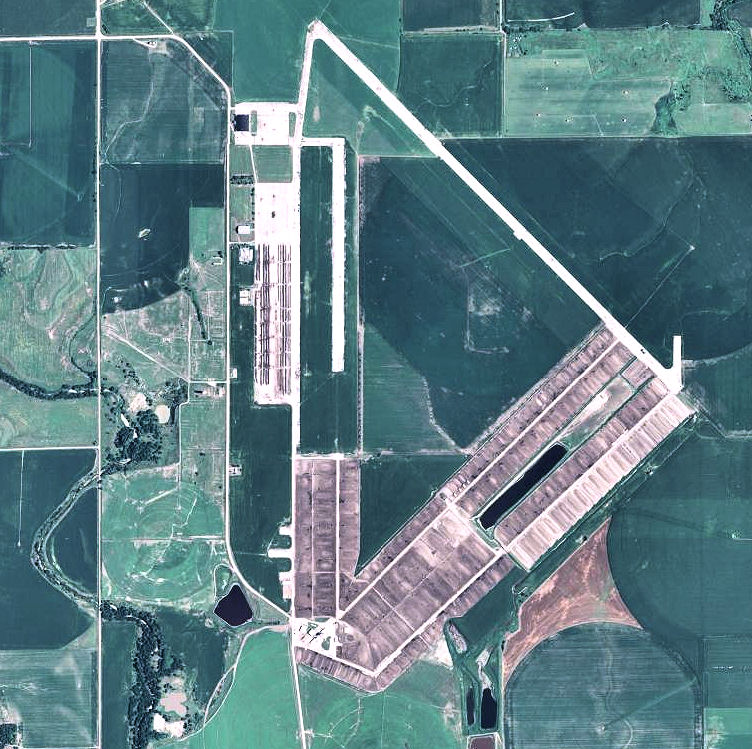
- 2006 USGS Orthophoto
- IATA: none; ICAO: none

Summary
- Airport type: Military
- Owner: United States Army Air Forces
- Location: Thayer County, near Bruning, Nebraska
- Coordinates: 40°20′25″N 097°25′42″W

Map
- Location of Bruning Army Air Field

Runways
Direction	Length		Surface
Direction	ft	m	Surface
17/35	6,800	2,072	Concrete not usable
13/31	6,800	2,072	Concrete not usable
04/22	6,800	2,072	Concrete not usable

Bruning Army Air Field was a flight training installation of the United States Army Air Forces used during World War II and located in northeast Thayer County, Nebraska, at coordinates 40°20'25" North, 97°25'42" West, approximately six miles east of Bruning.

== History ==
Bruning AAF was one of eleven Nebraska training airfields of the United States Army Air Forces during World War II. The airfield was constructed in 1942. The 1,720-acre (7.0 km^{2}) site is bordered on the west by low hills and a small creek bed. Level farm ground is on the north, east and south boundaries. On 12 September 1942, twelve land owners received notice from the federal government that they had ten days to move off their farms, including livestock, farm equipment, feed and all possessions, leaving crops in the fields. They were compensated approximately $50 an acre. Some of the vacated farm buildings and houses were moved, while others were demolished. Immediately thereafter, construction began on the Bruning Army Air Field, with approximately 1,000 construction workers were used to build the field on 1,720 acres (7 km^{2}) of land, with an additional 2,122 acres (9 km^{2}) south of the base leased for a gunnery range. At its peak of activity, Bruning had 3,077 military and 500 civilian personnel assigned.

The base consisted of three runways of 6,800 feet (2,070 m) in length, formed in a triangle, with the main parking apron (600 by 2,135 ft) located on the north-south (17/35) runway. Three hangars and 231 support buildings were constructed. The base was activated on March 18, 1943, and dedicated on August 28, 1943. The first unit arrived for training on August 2, 1943.

Bruning AAF was under the command of Second Air Force Headquarters, Colorado Springs, Colorado, and provided final training for Consolidated B-24 Liberator heavy bombers and Republic P-47 Thunderbolt fighter-bomber crews. Twelve bombardment squadrons and nine fighter squadrons completed proficiency training at the field before receiving orders for overseas combat assignments. Complete engine and airframe repairs were available for the B-24 bombers and P-47 fighters attached to Bruning AAF.

The host unit at the airfield was the 510th Base Headquarters and Air Base Squadron until 1 March 1944, when it was replaced by the 262d Army Air Forces Base Unit (Operational Training Unit, Fighter). The 510th was assigned to the 16th Bombardment Operational Training Wing (July - December 1943), then was transferred to the 72nd Fighter Wing in December 1943. The following units trained at Bruning AAF:

- 456th Bombardment Group - August 2-October 8, 1943

744th, 745th, 746th and 747th Bombardment Squadrons
Deployed to Fifteenth Air Force in Italy, (B-24 Liberator)

- 449th Bombardment Group - September 12- December 3, 1943

716th, 717th, 718th and 719th Bombardment Squadrons
Deployed to Fifteenth Air Force in Italy, (B-24 Liberator)

- 487th Bombardment Group - September 20-December 15, 1943

836th, 837th, 838th and 839th Bombardment Squadrons
Deployed to Eighth Air Force in England, (B-24 Liberator)

- 507th Fighter Group- October 20-December 12, 1944

463rd, 464th, and 465th Fighter Squadrons
Deployed to Twentieth Air Force in Okinawa, (P-47 Thunderbolt)

- 508th Fighter Group - November 15-December 18, 1944

466th, 467th, and 468th Fighter Squadrons
Deployed to Hawaii as replacement training group, (P-47 Thunderbolt)

- 23d Fighter Squadron - November 1943 - March 1944

Component of 36th Fighter Group at Scribner Army Air Field, Nebraska
Deployed to Ninth Air Force in England (P-47 Thunderbolt)

- 516th Fighter Squadron - 3 March - 1 April 1944

Component of 407th Fighter-Bomber Group
Replacement Training Unit (A-24 Dauntless, A-36 Apache)

- 517th Fighter Squadron - 3 March - 1 April 1944

Component of 407th Fighter-Bomber Group
Replacement Training Unit (A-24 Dauntless, A-36 Apache)

Local historians record that 23 airmen died in training accidents at the base, and an additional 28 were killed in a single incident on August 4, 1944, when a C-47 Skytrain carrying a graduating class of fighter pilots ran into a thunderstorm and crashed near Naper, Nebraska, killing all on board.

Bruning AAF was placed on reserve status effective 7 February 1945 and assigned to Air Technical Service Command. The 4167th Army Air Force Base Unit was assigned to the airfield with a mission to maintain the airfield in reserve status until such time as it may be needed as an active station.

The base was declared surplus by the USAAF on November 21, 1945 and turned over to the State of Nebraska. In 1947, 174 buildings were dismantled at Bruning. On January 15, 1948, Nebraska Department of Aeronautics acquired a quitclaim deed for Bruning Army Airfield from the U. S. War Assets Administration. The Nebraska Department of Aeronautics eventually took over a total of six former Army airfields after the war, and continued to operate nearly all of them for many years as state operated civilian airports. The Bruning field was operated as a State airfield until August 1969, although gradually all but a small portion of one runway were closed. The property is now closed to traffic and is leased to local farmers and a cattle feedlot company

Bruning Army Airfield is now abandoned, with only a few buildings and the large Sub Depot hangar still standing, as well as remnants of foundations and floors found at the site. The integrity of Hangar 52 is fairly good, but Hangar 53 is in very poor condition, near ruins. The North-South and SW-NE runways are used as the home of Mid-America Feed Yard, a large commercial cattle feed lot, and the NW-SE runway is still visible.

On July 19, 1998 the Thayer County Historical Society dedicated a Nebraska State Historical Monument on Highway 4 about 6 miles (10 km) east of Bruning, near the site of Bruning AAF.

== See also ==
- Nebraska World War II Army Airfields
