= Clovis Regional Airport =

Airport in New Mexico, United States

- IATA: CVN; ICAO: KCVN; FAA LID: CVN

Summary
- Airport type: Public
- Owner: City of Clovis
- Serves: Clovis, New Mexico
- Elevation AMSL: 4,216 ft (1,285 m)
- Coordinates: 34°25′31″N 103°04′45″W
- Website: Clovis Regional Airport

Map
- Location of airport in New Mexico / United States CVN (the United States)

Runways
| Direction | Length | | Surface |
| Direction | ft | m | Surface |
|---|---|---|---|
| 4/22 | 7,200 | 2,195 | Asphalt |
| 12/30 | 5,697 | 1,736 | Asphalt |
| 8/26 | 2,442 | 744 | Turf |

Statistics (2019)
- Aircraft operations: 24,648
- Based aircraft: 56
- Source: Federal Aviation Administration

Clovis Regional Airport (IATA: CVN, ICAO: KCVN, FAA LID: CVN) is a city-owned, public-use airport located six nautical miles (7 mi, 11 km) east of the central business district of Clovis, a city in Curry County, New Mexico, United States. The facility opened in April 1959 and is mostly used for general aviation, but is also served by one commercial airline. Current scheduled passenger service is subsidized by the Essential Air Service program. The airport was previously known as Clovis Municipal Airport but underwent a name change to Clovis Regional Airport in 2021 when it was upgraded to Part 121 status.

It is included in the National Plan of Integrated Airport Systems for 2011–2015, which categorized it as a general aviation airport (the commercial service category requires at least 2,500 enplanements per year).

== Facilities and aircraft ==
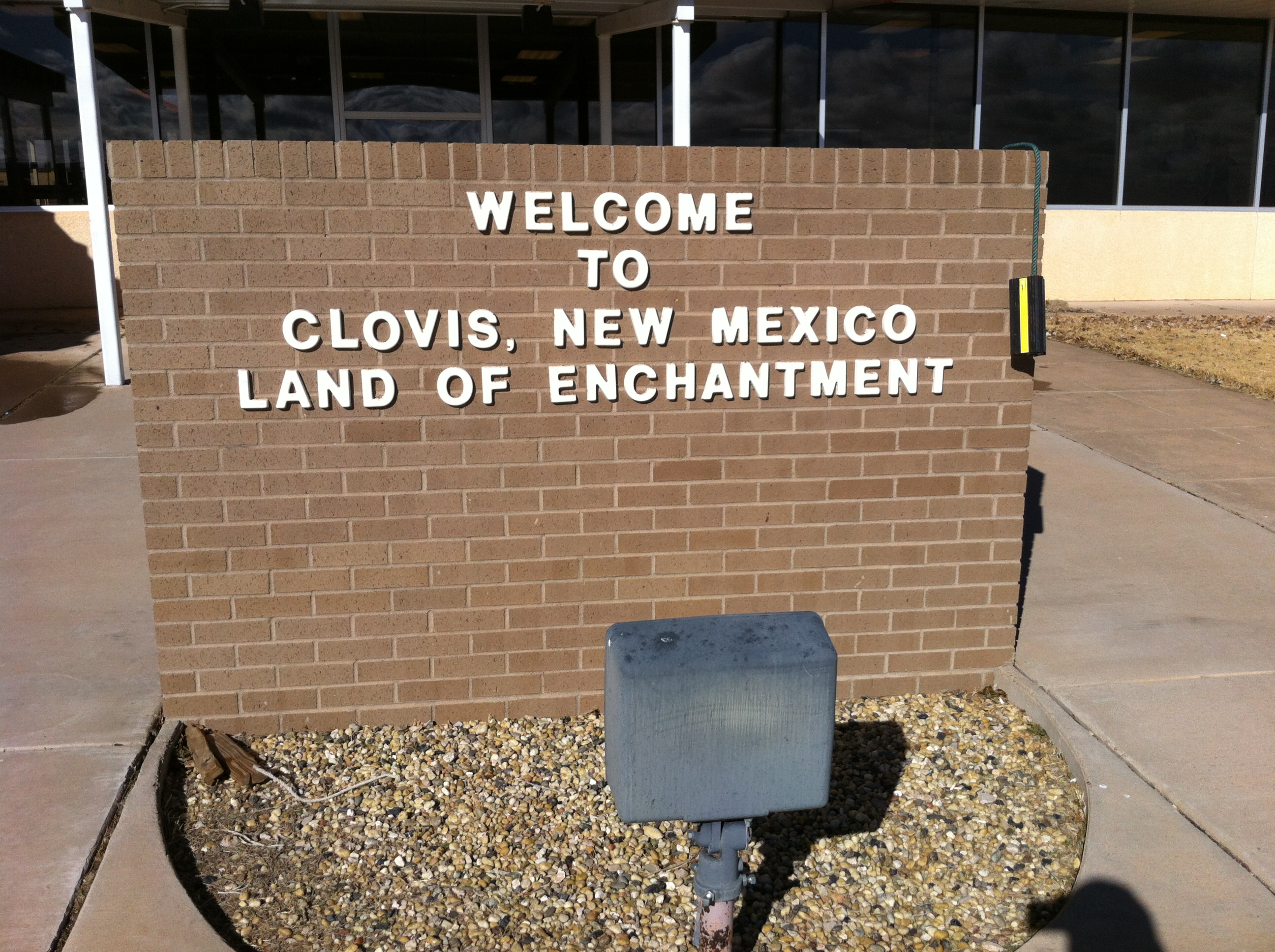
Sign at Clovis Airport welcoming arrivals

Clovis Regional Airport covers an area of 1,480 acres (599 ha) at an elevation of 4,216 feet (1,285 m) above mean sea level. It has three runways, two of which have asphalt surfaces: 4/22 is 7,200 by 150 feet (2,195 by 46 m) and 12/30 is 5,697 by 150 feet (1,736 by 46 m). It also has one turf runway designated 8/26 which measures 2,442 by 75 feet (744 by 23 m).

For the 12-month period ending February 28, 2019; the airport had 24,648 aircraft operations, an average of 68 per day: 85% general aviation, 7% military and 8% air taxi. At that time there were 56 aircraft based at this airport: 73% single-engine, 14% multi-engine, 11% jet, and 2% helicopter.

== Airline and destinations ==
Denver Air Connection connects Clovis Airport to Dallas/Fort Worth International Airport and Denver International Airport.

The Denver Air Connection service is currently being operated with Embraer ERJ-145 regional jet aircraft.

=== Historical airline service ===
Initially, all airline service to Clovis had been operated via the current Cannon Air Force Base (CVS). Continental Airlines, the main airline serving Clovis, transferred its service to the Clovis Municipal Airport in 1959.

As Continental continued to evolve into a major air carrier, in 1963 the airline then transferred all of their Clovis service as well as its services to other smaller cities in New Mexico to Trans-Texas Airways (TTa). Trans-Texas basically operated the same services previously flown by Continental with flights to Albuquerque and Dallas Love Field originally reverting to DC-3 aircraft but later upgrading to Convair 240 prop aircraft followed by Convair 600 turboprops with the airline referring to the latter aircraft as the "Jet Powered TTa Silver Cloud 600". According to the August 1968 Trans-Texas system timetable, the airline was operating all of its flights from Clovis with Convair 600 propjets with four departures every weekday including nonstop service to Albuquerque, Lubbock, TX and Santa Fe, NM as well as direct no change of plane service to Abilene, TX, Big Spring, TX and Dallas Love Field. TTa then changed its name to Texas International Airlines (TI) in 1969 and for a brief period during the late 1970s, TI introduced 85-seat Douglas DC-9-10 jet service to Clovis. This was the first time Clovis had jet service, which was operated via Cannon in order to accommodate the DC-9s. However, in 1978, Texas International then reverted to once again using Convair 600 propjets via the Clovis Municipal Airport (CVN) for all of its flights with service only being operated nonstop to Albuquerque.

As Texas International was now growing into a larger all-jet airline, TI discontinued its Clovis flights in early 1979 and service was transferred to two smaller commuter airlines, Air Midwest and Crown Aviation. Crown had started service at Clovis two years prior with flights operated with twin prop Piper aircraft to Albuquerque and Lubbock but then went out of business in 1980. Air Midwest operated 17-seat Swearingen Metroliner propjets with flights to Albuquerque, Amarillo, and Wichita, KS. Mesa Airlines began serving Clovis in 1985 using Beechcraft 99 commuter turboprops followed by Beechcraft 1900C propjets on flights to Albuquerque. However, Air Midwest discontinued their service shortly afterwards. Mesa continued to serve the city for 20 years until 2005 when service was replaced by Great Lakes Aviation which operated flights to Albuquerque as well as a flight to Amarillo and Denver using Beechcraft 1900D turboprops. The flight to Amarillo was later dropped and all service was briefly shifted to a Clovis - Santa Fe - Denver route in 2012 before Great Lakes ended all flights on January 31, 2014. Clovis was without any airline service until July 2014 when Boutique Air inaugurated three daily nonstop flights to Dallas/Ft. Worth using 8-seat Pilatus PC-12 aircraft via a federal Essential Air Service contract. In August 2018, Boutique Air upgraded the aircraft used to multi-engine, nine-seat Beechcraft Super King Air model 350s. Boutique Air's EAS contract ended on May 1, 2020, at which time Key Lime Air dba Denver Air Connection began two daily flights to Denver using Fairchild Dornier 328JET regional jet aircraft. In late 2021, Denver Air Connection added a daily flight to Dallas/Fort Worth while reducing flights to Denver from two to one per day. The airline also upgraded their aircraft to a 50-seat Embraer ERJ-145 regional jet.

== Statistics ==
Top domestic destinations (March 2019 - February 2020)
| Rank | City | Airport name & IATA code | Passengers |
|---|---|---|---|
| 1 | Dallas, TX | Dallas/Fort Worth International Airport | 5,570 |

Passenger boardings (enplanements) by year, as per the FAA
| Year | 2008 | 2009 | 2010 | 2011 | 2012 | 2013 | 2014 | 2015 | 2016 | 2017 | 2018 | 2019 | 2020 |
|---|---|---|---|---|---|---|---|---|---|---|---|---|---|
| Enplanements | 2,419 | 2,028 | 2,165 | 2,033 | 1,694 | 1,384 | 1,952 | 4,799 | 4,854 | 5,053 | 4,750 | 5,335 | 2,643 |
| Change | ▼5.54% | ▼16.16% | ▲6.76% | ▼6.10% | ▼16.67% | ▼18.30% | ▲41.04% | ▲145.85% | ▲1.15% | ▲4.10% | ▼6.00% | ▲12.3% | ▼50.46% |
| Airline | Great Lakes Airlines | Great Lakes Airlines | Great Lakes Airlines | Great Lakes Airlines | Great Lakes Airlines | Great Lakes Airlines | Boutique Air | Boutique Air | Boutique Air | Boutique Air | Boutique Air | Boutique Air | Denver Air |
| Destination(s) | Albuquerque | Albuquerque | Albuquerque | Albuquerque | Albuquerque | Liberal Pueblo | Dallas | Dallas | Dallas | Dallas | Dallas | Dallas | Denver |

Passenger enplanements in 2021: 7,545, 2022: 13,028, 2023: 14,000.

== Other sources ==
- Essential Air Service documents (Docket OST-1996-1902) from the U.S. Department of Transportation:
  - Order 2004-12-21 (December 29, 2004): selecting Great Lakes Aviation, Ltd., to provide essential air service with 19-passenger Beech B1900D aircraft at Clovis and Silver City/Hurley/Deming, New Mexico, for two years at a combined annual subsidy rate of $1,718,113.
  - Order 2007-3-18 (March 20, 2007): selecting Great Lakes Aviation, Ltd. to provide subsidized essential air service (EAS) at Clovis and Silver City/Hurley/Deming, New Mexico, for two years, beginning May 1, 2007, through April 30, 2009. Clovis will receive 18 one-stop round trips per week to Denver at an annual subsidy of $999,932. Silver City/Hurley/Deming will receive 12 nonstop weekly round trips to Phoenix at an annual subsidy of $992,799. Both communities will be served with 19-passenger Beech 1900 aircraft. The total combined annual subsidy is $1,992,731.
  - Order 2007-4-5 (April 4, 2007): the department is granting the motion of Grant County, New Mexico, to file a petition for reconsideration of Order 2007-3-18, issued March 20, 2007, and, upon review, deciding to vacate the earlier decision and resolicit Essential Air Service proposals.
  - Order 2007-5-19 (May 31, 2007): selecting Great Lakes Aviation, Ltd. to provide subsidized essential air service (EAS) at Clovis and Silver City/Hurley/Deming, New Mexico, for two years, beginning May 1, 2007, through April 30, 2009. Clovis and Silver City/Hurley/Deming each will receive 12 nonstop round trips per week to Albuquerque with 19-passenger Beechcraft 1900D aircraft at an annual combined subsidy of $2,365,290.
  - Order 2009-3-3 (March 6, 2009): re-selecting Great Lakes Aviation, Ltd. to provide essential air service (EAS) at Clovis and Silver City/Hurley/Deming, New Mexico, at a combined annual subsidy rate of $2,959,451 ($1,517,277 for Clovis and $1,442,174 for Silver City), for the two-year period from May 1, 2009, through April 30, 2011.
  - Order 2011-4-19 (April 22, 2011): reselects Great Lakes Aviation, Ltd., to provide subsidized EAS with 19-passenger Beechcraft B-1900D aircraft at Clovis and Silver City/Hurley/Deming, New Mexico (Silver City), for the period from May 1, 2011, to May 31, 2013, at a combined annual subsidy rate of $3,186,249.
  - Ninety-Day Notice (June 4, 2012) of Great Lakes Aviation, Ltd. serving notice of intent to terminate scheduled air service to·Clovis, New Mexico and Silver City/Hurley/Deming, New Mexico from Albuquerque, New Mexico effective September 3, 2012.
