= Alliance Municipal Airport =

Alliance Municipal Airport (former Alliance Army Airfield)
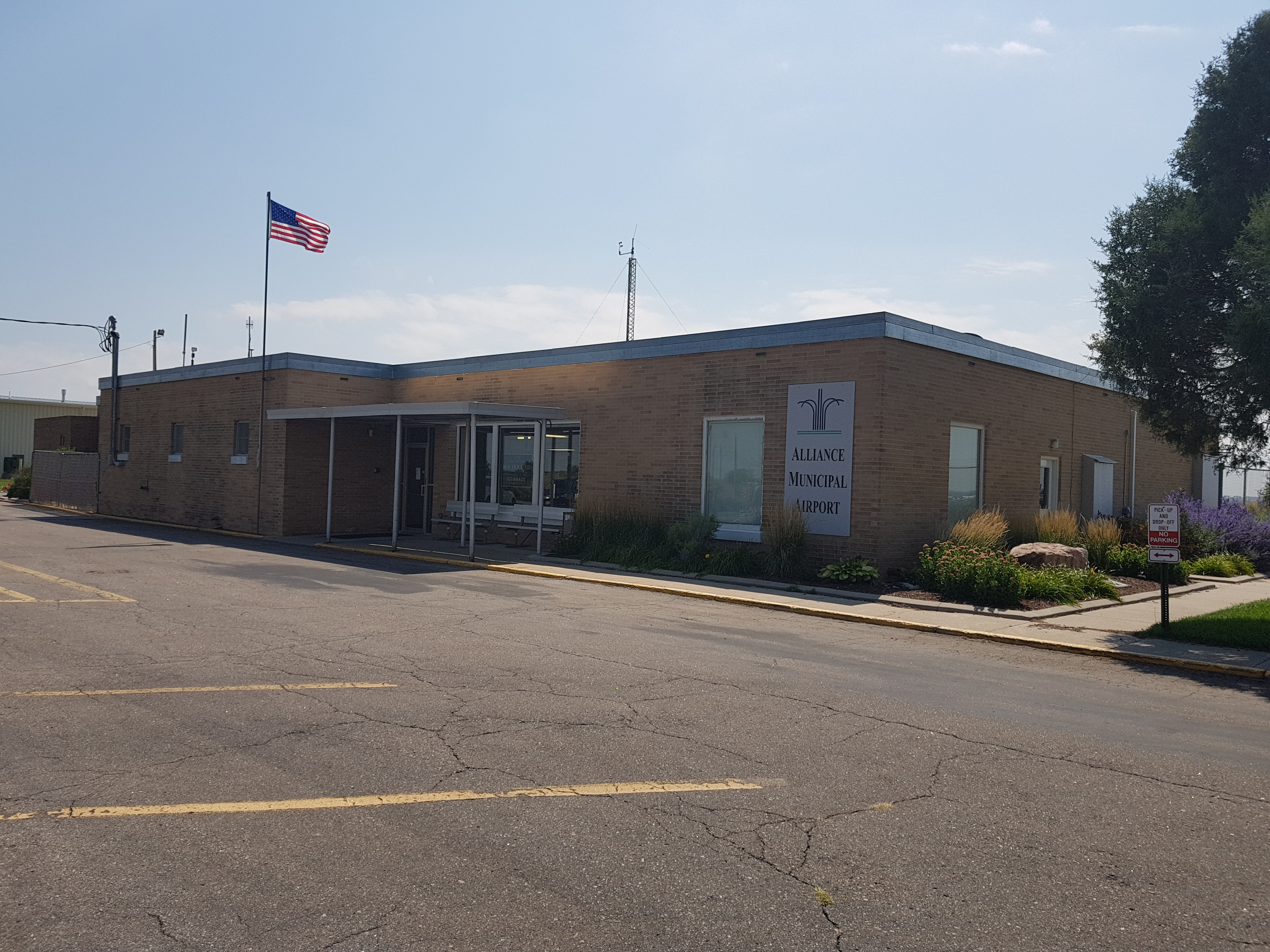
- View of terminal building (2017)
- IATA: AIA; ICAO: KAIA; FAA LID: AIA

Summary
- Airport type: Public
- Owner: City of Alliance
- Serves: Alliance, Nebraska
- Elevation AMSL: 3,931 ft (1,198 m)
- Coordinates: 42°03′12″N 102°48′14″W
- Website: www.flyalliancene.com

Maps
- FAA airport diagram
- Interactive map of Alliance Municipal Airport

Runways
Direction	Length		Surface
Direction	ft	m	Surface
12/30	9,203	2,805	Asphalt
17/35	6,311	1,924	Asphalt
8/26	6,190	1,887	Asphalt

Statistics (2022)
- Aircraft operations (year ending 5/31/2022): 13,697
- Based aircraft: 53
- Source: Federal Aviation Administration

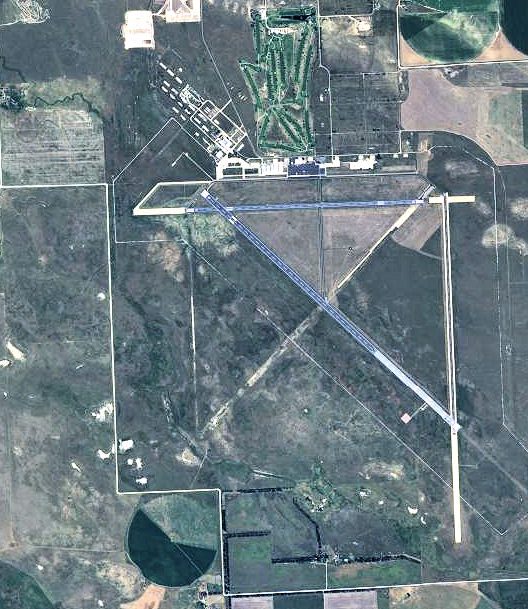
USGS 2006 orthophoto

Alliance Municipal Airport (IATA: AIA, ICAO: KAIA, FAA LID: AIA) is in Box Butte County, Nebraska, three miles southeast of the city of Alliance, which owns it. Denver Air Connection offers scheduled passenger flights to Denver, which are subsidized by the Essential Air Service program.

The National Plan of Integrated Airport Systems for 2011–2015 categorized it as a general aviation facility (the commercial service category requires 2,500 enplanements per year).

== History ==
Alliance Municipal Airport was built during World War II by the United States Army Air Forces (USAAF) as one of eleven USAAF training airfields in Nebraska during World War II. On April 14, 1942, the secretary of war authorized the establishment of the field. It was built between summer 1942 and August 1943. The 4,205-acre (17.02 km^{2}) site is bordered by low rolling sandhills to the east, and a wide plain on the north, west and south. Snake Creek flows through the southern section of the property.

During construction over 5,000 workers came from all over the country, causing a housing shortage. The population of Alliance doubled almost overnight. Workers moved into garages, store rooms, cellars, attics, and even their own trailers in established parks. Many of the workers were Sioux Indians from the Pine Ridge and Rosebud Reservations, Mexicans from the Southwest, and African Americans from Wichita and Kansas City.

The cantonment housing area of the airfield covered 1,088 acres (4.40 km^{2}), and had 775 buildings and other structures, including hangars, chapels, warehouses, barracks, mess halls, service buildings, and latrines. Some were brick and steel, such as aircraft hangars, but most were frame construction on concrete foundations. Tar paper and plywood were generally used for walls and flooring, as the buildings were considered temporary, to be used for a few years. The airfield had a railroad spur, power plant, waterworks, sewage system and 35,503 feet (10,821 m) of runways. The airfield had been planned as a training facility for paratroops and air commandos, which needed long runways for C-47 Skytrains to tow gliders.

On August 22, 1943, a huge crowd of 65,000 people gathered for the dedication of Alliance Army Airfield, a training facility for Army paratroops and air crews. Between the opening of the airfield and spring 1944, the I Troop Carrier Command, 434th Troop Carrier Group commanded the airfield. The 411th Army Air Force Base Unit commanded the support elements at Alliance as part of Air Technical Service Command. In addition to the C-47s, the unit repaired B-17 Flying Fortress and B-24 Liberator aircraft from other airfields.

Alliance AAF was divided into air operations, quartermaster, troop cantonment, and gunnery ranges. The airfield was home to as many as 14,000 paratroops in the area, using C-47 Skytrains as powered troop carriers, and CG-3/CG-4 Waco glider troop carriers for their training aircraft. The sandhills were thought to provide a softer landing than wooded areas for jumping paratroops. Known units that trained at Alliance AAF were:

- 403d Troop Carrier Group (December 18, 1942 - May 3, 1943)

The group eventually moved to the South Pacific as part of Thirteenth Air Force.

- 434th Troop Carrier Group (9 February 1943 - 5 September)

The group eventually moved to England as part of Ninth Air Force.

- 436th Troop Carrier Group (May 2 - August 1, 1943)

The group eventually moved to England as part of Ninth Air Force.

- 439th Troop Carrier Group (June 1 - December 16, 1943)

The group eventually moved to England as part of Ninth Air Force.

- 440th Troop Carrier Group (September 7, 1943 - January 4, 1944)

The group eventually moved to England as part of Ninth Air Force.

- 442d Troop Carrier Group (December 1943 - January 1944)

The group eventually moved to England as part of Ninth Air Force.

- 349th Troop Carrier Group (January 19 - March 8, 1944)

The group eventually moved to England as part of Ninth Air Force.

- 443d Troop Carrier Group (January 19 - February 15, 1944)

The group eventually moved to the China-Burma-India Theater.

- 10th Troop Carrier Group (March 8 - April 14, 1944)

The group trained cadres for troop carrier groups and trained replacement crews. It was inactivated in place.

In addition to the USAAF units, the Army 326th Glider Infantry, 507th Parachute Infantry, and 878th Airborne Engineers trained at Alliance before deployment to the European Theater.

As paratroopers flooded into Alliance, housing was short. A federal housing project was built at the east end of Alliance, apartment complexes with plain stucco walls, coal heating stoves, and rows of chimneys along the rooflines, thus the name "Chimney Town."

After the paratroops left Alliance, Second Air Force temporarily used the Alliance airfield in the fall of 1944 for the training of B-29 Superfortress crews. Training included teaching the B-29 air crews how to drop bombs and read navigational, aeronautical and bombsight equipment.

Finally, in the summer of 1945, the 1st Troop Carrier Command returned to the airfield to train for the proposed invasion of Japan. That necessity ended when Japan surrendered on September 6. On October 31, 1945, the Army Air Force "temporarily" deactivated the Alliance Army Airfield. Control of the airfield was assigned to Air Technical Service Command at Ogden Army Airbase, Utah.

Though speculation was that the Army would make the huge Alliance airfield a permanent installation, by November 20 the Troop Carrier Command closed the facility permanently and began to make plans to sell the surplus property.

By December 1945 the facility was declared surplus property. Nonetheless, its status remained in limbo. The city of Alliance showed interest in acquiring the facility. However, in the fall of 1946 Nebraska congressman Arthur L. Miller stated that the airfield would be withdrawn from the surplus list to be reactivated for Troop Carrier Command training, in response to strained relations with the Soviet Union. This did not happen and the U. S. Government negotiated a disposition agreement for the facility.

Due to disputes between the U.S. government and the city of Alliance, the final disposition of the airfield did not occur for many years. The government removed the railroad tracks and auctioned off 240 buildings, including lavatories, guard houses and barracks. Finally, on July 16, 1953, the city of Alliance and the federal government finalized the transfer for the land and buildings which were to become the Alliance Municipal Airport.

Today, many World War II-era buildings remain in use.

Western DC-3s started flying to Alliance in the 1940s; Frontier replaced Western in 1959 and ended its Twin Otter flights in 1980.

== Facilities and aircraft ==
The airport covers 3,500 acres (1,416 ha) at an elevation of 3,931 feet. It has three asphalt runways: 12/30 is 9,203 by 150 feet (2,805 by 46 m); 17/35 is 6,311 by 75 feet (1,924 by 23 m); 8/26 is 6,190 by 75 feet (1,887 by 23 m).

In the year ending May 31, 2022; the airport had 13,697 aircraft operations, average 38 per day: 90% general aviation, 9% airline, <1% air taxi, and <1% military. 53 aircraft were then based at the airport: 49 single-engine, 3 multi-engine, and 1 glider.

== Airline and destination ==
Scheduled nonstop passenger flights:

Airlines	Destinations
Denver Air Connection	Denver

== Statistics ==
Top domestic destinations from AIA (April 2021 - March 2022)
Rank	City	Airport	Passengers
1	Denver, CO	Denver International (DEN)	4,000

Passenger boardings (enplanements) by year, as per the FAA
Year	2008	2009	2010	2011	2012	2013	2014	2015	2016	2017	2018
Enplanements	1,786	1,395	1,416	1,730	1,594	1,426	472	1,474	2,139	2,460	2,921
Change	▼11.14%	▼21.89%	▲1.51%	▲22.18%	▼7.86%	▼10.54%	▼66.90%	▲212.29%	▲45.12%	▲15.01%	▲18.74%
Airline	Great Lakes Airlines	Great Lakes Airlines	Great Lakes Airlines	Great Lakes Airlines	Great Lakes Airlines	Great Lakes Airlines	Great Lakes Airlines	Boutique Air	Boutique Air	Boutique Air	Boutique Air
Destination(s)	Chadron Denver	Chadron Denver	Denver Pierre	Denver Pierre	Denver Scottsbluff	Denver Scottsbluff	Denver Scottsbluff	Denver	Denver	Denver	Denver

== See also ==
- I Troop Carrier Command
- Nebraska World War II Army Airfields
- List of airports in Nebraska

== Other sources ==
- This article incorporates public domain material from the Air Force Historical Research Agency
- ArmyAirForces.com
- Maurer, Maurer (1983). Air Force Combat Units Of World War II. Maxwell AFB, Alabama: Office of Air Force History. ISBN 0-89201-092-4.
