= 393rd Bombardment Group =

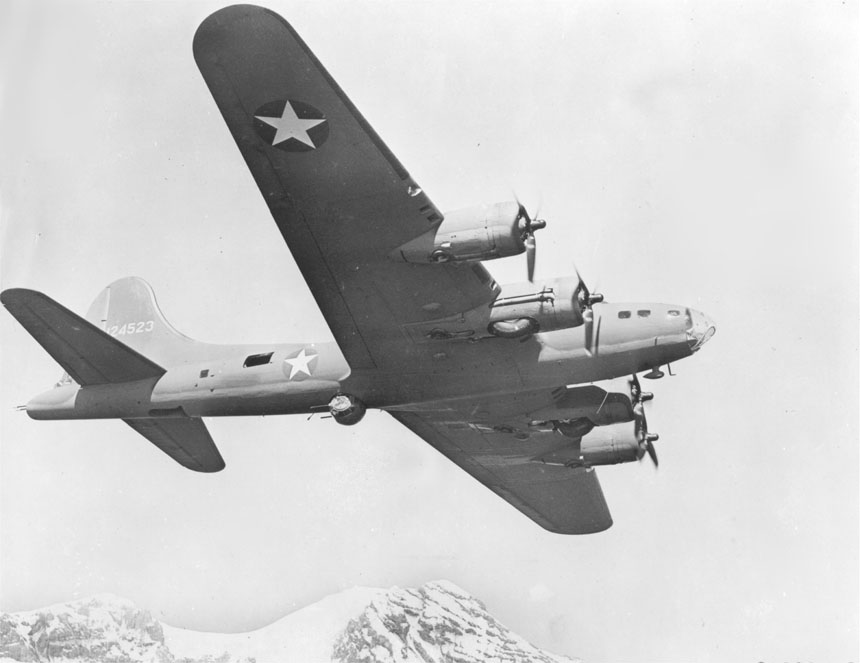
- B-17 Flying Fortress as flown by the group
- Active: 1943–1944
- Country: United States
- Branch: United States Air Force
- Role: Heavy bomber training

The 393d Bombardment Group is a disbanded United States Air Force unit. It was part of Second Air Force, and last stationed at Sioux City Army Air Base, Iowa, where it was inactivated on 1 April 1944. During World War II the group was a Boeing B-17 Flying Fortress Operational Training Unit, and later a Replacement Training Unit. It was inactivated in April 1944 in a general reorganization of Army Air Forces training units.

== History ==
The 393rd Bombardment Group was activated in February 1943 at Geiger Field, Washington, with the 580th, 581st, 582nd and 583rd Bombardments assigned as its operational components. In March, the group moved to Gowen Field, Idaho and began to equip with Boeing B-17 Flying Fortresses to act as an Operational Training Unit (OTU). The OTU program involved the use of an oversized parent unit to provide cadres to "satellite groups". The OTU program was patterned after the unit training system of the Royal Air Force. It assumed responsibility for unit training and oversaw their expansion with graduates of Army Air Forces Training Command schools to become effective combat units. Phase I training concentrated on individual training in crewmember specialties. Phase II training emphasized the coordination for the crew to act as a team. The final phase concentrated on operation as a unit. The group was at Gowen for a month before moving to Wendover Field, Utah.

The group moved to Sioux City Army Air Base, Iowa in June 1943, but only the 582nd Squadron remained there with group headquarters. On 3 July, the 581st moved to Mitchell Army Air Field, South Dakota and the 583rd to Scribner Army Air Field, Nebraska. The following day, the 580th relocated to Watertown Army Air Field, South Dakota.

On 1 August 1943, the group moved to Kearney Army Air Field, Nebraska, where it was joined by its component squadrons and changed its mission to a Replacement Training Unit (RTU). By 1943 most combat units had been activated and almost three quarters of them had deployed overseas. With the exception of special programs, like forming Boeing B-29 Superfortress units, training "fillers" for existing units became more important than unit training. RTUs were oversized units like OTUs, but their mission was to train individual pilots or aircrews.

In November 1943, the group returned to Sioux City. However, The Army Air Forces (AAF) was finding that standard military units like the 393rd, whose manning was based on relatively inflexible tables of organization were proving not well adapted to the training mission, even more so to the replacement mission. Accordingly, the AAF adopted a more functional system in which each base was organized into a separate numbered unit. As a result, the 393rd, along with its components were inactivated and their personnel and equipment were combined with those of support units at Sioux City into the 224th AAF Base Unit (Combat Crew Training Station, Bombardment, Heavy), which assumed the base's training mission.

== Lineage ==
- Constituted as the 393rd Bombardment Group (Heavy) on 29 January 1943

Activated on 16 February 1943
Inactivated on 1 April 1944
Disbanded 9 September 1992

=== Assignments ===
- II Bomber Command, 16 February 1943 – 1 April 1944 (attached to 46th Bombardment Operational Training Wing after 1 January 1944)

=== Components ===
- 580th Bombardment Squadron: 16 February 1943 – 1 April 1944
- 581st Bombardment Squadron: 16 February 1943 – 1 April 1944
- 582d Bombardment Squadron: 16 February 1943 – 1 April 1944
- 583d Bombardment Squadron : 16 February 1943 – 1 April 1944

=== Stations ===
- Geiger Field, Washington, 16 February 1943
- Gowen Field, Idaho, 3 March 1943
- Wendover Field, Utah, c. 3 April 1943
- Sioux City Army Air Base, Iowa, 11 June 1943
- Kearney Army Air Field, Nebraska, 1 August 1943
- Sioux City Army Air Base, Iowa, 7 November 1943 – 1 April 1944

=== Aircraft ===
- Boeing B-17 Flying Fortess, 1943-1944

=== Campaign ===
| Campaign Streamer | Campaign | Dates | Notes |
|---|---|---|---|
| | American Theater without inscription | 16 February 1943 – 1 April 1944 | |
