= Ainsworth Regional Airport =

Airport in Nebraska, United States

Ainsworth Regional Airport Ainsworth Army Airfield
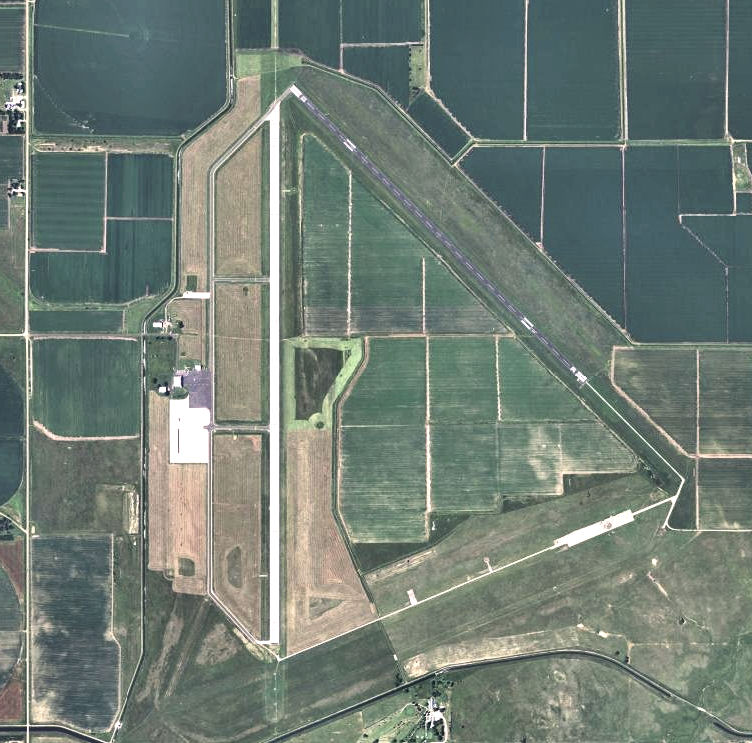
- USGS 2006 orthophoto
- IATA: ANW; ICAO: KANW; FAA LID: ANW

Summary
- Airport type: Public
- Owner: Ainsworth Airport Authority
- Serves: Ainsworth, Nebraska
- Elevation AMSL: 2,589 ft (789 m)
- Coordinates: 42°34′45″N 099°59′35″W

Map
- Location in Nebraska

Runways
Direction	Length		Surface
Direction	ft	m	Surface
17/35	6,824	2,080	Asphalt
13/31	5,501	1,677	Asphalt

Helipads
Number	Length		Surface
Number	ft	m	Surface
H1	50	15	Asphalt

Statistics (2020)
- Aircraft operations (year ending 6/25/2020): 4,000
- Based aircraft: 13
- Source: Federal Aviation Administration

Ainsworth Regional Airport (IATA: ANW, ICAO: KANW, FAA LID: ANW) (formerly Ainsworth Municipal Airport) is seven miles northwest of Ainsworth, in Brown County, Nebraska. It is owned by the Ainsworth Airport Authority. The National Plan of Integrated Airport Systems for 2011–2015 called it a general aviation airport.

== History ==
The airport was built by the United States Army Air Forces between August and November 1942. The 2,403-acre (9.72 km^{2}) site is bordered by farm land on the west and north, Sand Draw on the east, and Highway 20 on the south.

Sixty four buildings were built at what would be known as Ainsworth Army Airfield. To construct the base, once land was acquired through condemnation and purchase from seven local landowners, laborers were hired from as far away as Omaha and Sioux City. Two hundred Native Americans from the Pine Ridge Reservation in South Dakota came to Ainsworth and were put on the payroll as laborers. A total of 1,200 workers came to build the Airfield. By November 1942 the laborers had completed all housing at the base, and a spur was built from the existing Chicago Northwestern Railroad several miles to the south. These tracks brought most of the supplies for the base, including building materials, food, and coal. The 2,496-acre (10.10 km^{2}) field had three 7,300 × 150-foot (46 m) concrete runways, a hangar, warehouse, repair and machine shops, link and bomb trainers, Norden bombsite vaults, and barracks for over 600 officers and enlisted men.

Ainsworth AAF was activated on 30 November 1942 as one of eleven United States Army Air Forces training bases in Nebraska. The base was under the command of the 353d Army Air Force Base Unit of the Second Air Force, based at Colorado Springs AAF Colorado. The 4315th Army Air Force Base Unit commanded the support elements at Ainsworth as part of Air Technical Service Command. Ainsworth was a satellite field of Rapid City Army Air Base, South Dakota.

The primary objective of this facility was to train air crews of 540th and 543rd Bombardment Squadrons of the 383d Bombardment Group based at Rapid City Army Airfield for training with Boeing B-17 Flying Fortress aircraft before being sent to the European Theater. The 540th and 543rd remained at Ainsworth between December 1942 to April 1943. Bomber crews practiced bombing runs over the wildlife refuge in Cherry County, the next county to the west.

Other units that trained at Ainsworth during the war were:

- The 364th Fighter Squadron of the 357th Fighter Group based at Casper AAF, Wyoming trained with Bell P-39 Airacobra aircraft at Ainsworth from October to November 1943.
- The 53d Fighter Squadron of the 37th Fighter Group based at Scribner AAF, Nebraska trained with Republic P-47 Thunderbolt aircraft at Ainsworth between November 1943 to March 1944.

Aircraft camouflage experiments were conducted at the field. When the facility was fully manned, 544 enlisted men and 112 officers lived on the base. Married personnel lived in Long Pine, Ainsworth and Johnstown.

The base closed on 31 December 1945. Following the withdrawal of the military personnel, the base closed except for civilians who manned the Fire Department and the Weather Squadron.

In 1946 the United States Army Corps of Engineers issued a Revokable License to the City of Ainsworth for commercial aircraft operations at the Airfield. Ainsworth AAF was declared surplus property in 1948, and the City of Ainsworth received title to the Airfield for use as a municipal airport.

By late 1948 Ainsworth Municipal Airport was used for charter flights, aircraft rental, flight lessons and a maintenance shop. For a year or two starting in 1959 Ainsworth had scheduled airline flights—Frontier DC-3s.

In the mid-1980s the National Scientific Balloon Facility rented space at Ainsworth for periodic balloon missions. By the late 1980s, the Ainsworth Airport discontinued these services due to the depressed local economy. Currently the airport is overseen by the Airport Authority, which provides basic services, with an airport manager who oversees airport activities such as fuel sales, hangar rental, tie-downs, weather station operation, aircraft communications arid flight plan design. About 1,300 acres (5.3 km^{2}) of farm land and pasture is rented out to area farmers.

Today a handful of buildings remains from the World War II–era. One aircraft hangar is still in use, a supply warehouse, the bombardier training building and the bombsight building. Taxiways, hardstands, aprons, runways and roads exist in various states of repair.

== Facilities ==
The airport covers 2,493 acres (1,009 ha) at an elevation of 2,589 feet (789 m). It has two asphalt runways: 17/35 is 6,824 by 110 feet (2,080 by 34 metres) and 13/31 is 5,501 by 75 feet (1,677 by 23 metres). It has one helipad, H1, 50 by 50 feet (15 by 15 metres).

In the year ending June 25, 2020 the airport had 4,000 aircraft operations, average 77 per week: 98% general aviation and 1% military. Thirteen aircraft were then based at this airport: 10 single-engine, 1 multi-engine, one jet, and one helicopter.

== See also ==
- List of airports in Nebraska
- Airfields of the United States Army in Nebraska 1939-1945
