= Bruning, Nebraska =

Village in Thayer County, Nebraska, United States

- Village
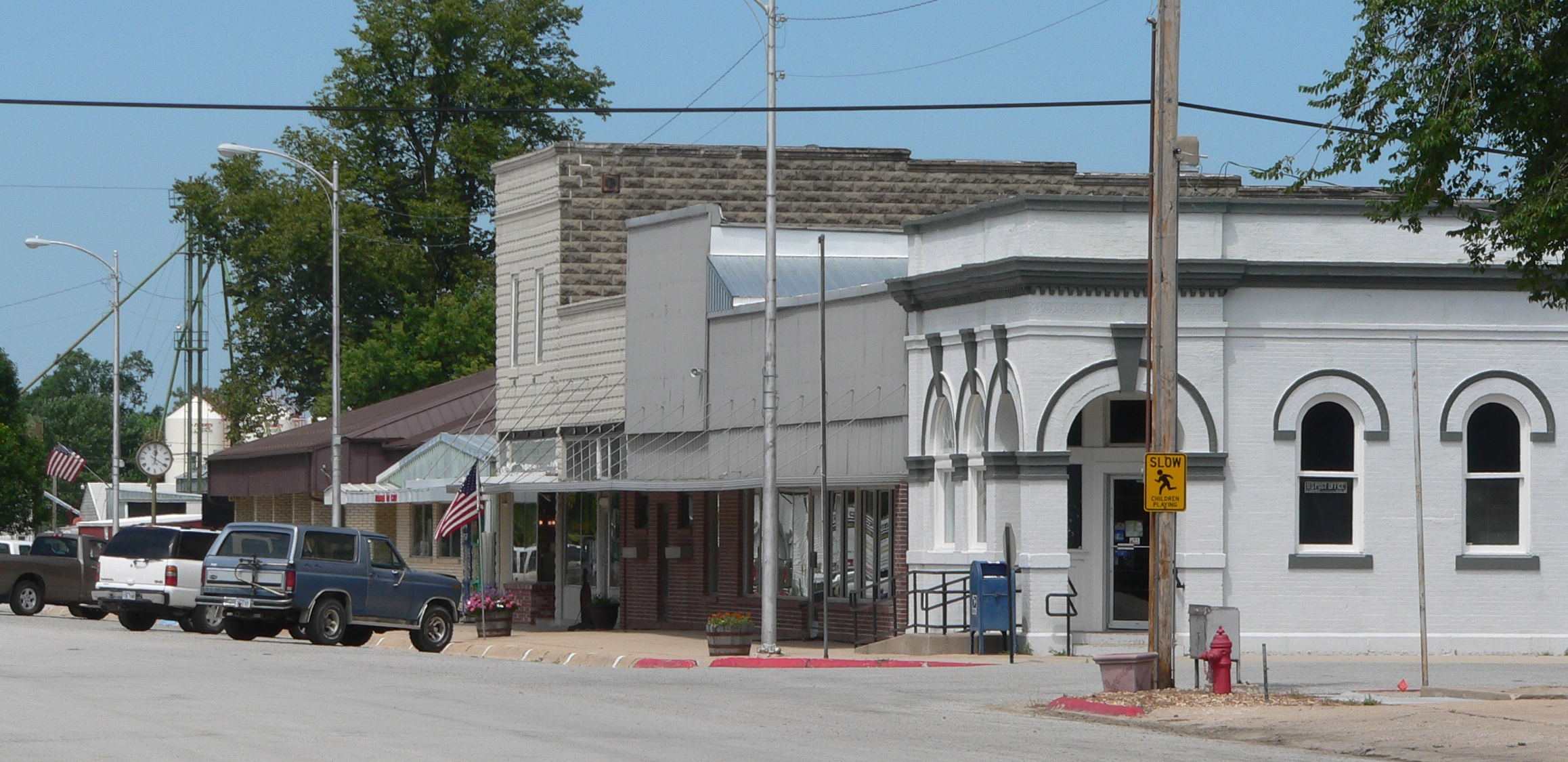
- Downtown Bruning: north side of Main Street, July 2010

- Location of Bruning, Nebraska
- Coordinates: 40°20′09″N 97°33′54″W
- Country: United States
- State: Nebraska
- County: Thayer

Area
  - Total: 0.27 sq mi (0.70 km^{2})
  - Land: 0.27 sq mi (0.70 km^{2})
  - Water: 0 sq mi (0.00 km^{2})
- Elevation: 1,588 ft (484 m)

Population (2020)
  - Total: 285
  - Estimate (2021): 278
  - Density: 1,100/sq mi (410/km^{2})
- Time zone: UTC-6 (Central (CST))
  - Summer (DST): UTC-5 (CDT)
- ZIP code: 68322
- Area code: 402
- FIPS code: 31-06820
- GNIS feature ID: 2397476

Bruning is a village in Thayer County, Nebraska, United States. The population was 285 at the 2020 census.

== History ==
Bruning was established in 1887 as a town on the railroad. It was named for Frank Bruning During World War II the U.S. Army Air Forces operated Bruning Army Airfield nearby. In October 1960, inventor and aviator Ed Yost used Bruning as the starting point for the first free flight of a modern, propane-fueled hot air balloon.

== Geography ==
According to the United States Census Bureau, the village has a total area of 0.28 square miles (0.73 km^{2}), all land.

=== Climate ===
Climate data for Burning, Nebraska(1991-2018 normals)
Month	Jan	Feb	Mar	Apr	May	Jun	Jul	Aug	Sep	Oct	Nov	Dec	Year
Average precipitation inches (mm)	0.70 (18)	0.92 (23)	1.41 (36)	2.77 (70)	4.76 (121)	4.29 (109)	3.45 (88)	3.20 (81)	2.76 (70)	2.03 (52)	1.31 (33)	1.01 (26)	28.61 (727)
Average snowfall inches (cm)	6.1 (15)	6.5 (17)	2.7 (6.9)	0.9 (2.3)	trace	0.0 (0.0)	0.0 (0.0)	0.0 (0.0)	0.0 (0.0)	0.7 (1.8)	1.6 (4.1)	4.3 (11)	22.8 (58.1)
Average extreme snow depth inches (cm)	4 (10)	5 (13)	3 (7.6)	1 (2.5)	0 (0)	0 (0)	0 (0)	0 (0)	0 (0)	1 (2.5)	1 (2.5)	3 (7.6)	5 (13)
Average precipitation days (≥ 0.01 Inches)	5	5	6	8	10	9	9	8	7	6	4	4	81
Average snowy days	3	3	1	1	0	0	0	0	0	0	1	2	11
Source: NOAA(National Weather Service)

== Demographics ==
Historical population
Census	Pop.	Note	%±
1900	255		—
1910	353		38.4%
1920	326		−7.6%
1930	316		−3.1%
1940	374		18.4%
1950	246		−34.2%
1960	289		17.5%
1970	315		9.0%
1980	330		4.8%
1990	332		0.6%
2000	300		−9.6%
2010	279		−7.0%
2020	281		0.7%
2021 (est.)	278	▼	−1.1%
U.S. Decennial Census

=== 2010 census ===
As of the census of 2010, there were 279 people, 135 households, and 80 families residing in the village. The population density was 996.4 inhabitants per square mile (384.7/km^{2}). There were 155 housing units at an average density of 553.6 per square mile (213.7/km^{2}). The racial makeup of the village was 100.0% White. Hispanic or Latino of any race were 0.7% of the population.

There were 135 households, of which 23.0% had children under the age of 18 living with them, 52.6% were married couples living together, 3.7% had a female householder with no husband present, 3.0% had a male householder with no wife present, and 40.7% were non-families. 35.6% of all households were made up of individuals, and 23.7% had someone living alone who was 65 years of age or older. The average household size was 2.07 and the average family size was 2.68.

The median age in the village was 48.3 years. 19% of residents were under the age of 18; 6.8% were between the ages of 18 and 24; 19% were from 25 to 44; 28.3% were from 45 to 64; and 26.9% were 65 years of age or older. The gender makeup of the village was 49.8% male and 50.2% female.

=== 2000 census ===
As of the census of 2000, there were 300 people, 150 households, and 85 families residing in the village. The population density was 1,070.6 inhabitants per square mile (413.4/km^{2}). There were 162 housing units at an average density of 578.1 per square mile (223.2/km^{2}). The racial makeup of the village was 100.00% White. Hispanic or Latino of any race were 1.67% of the population.

There were 150 households, out of which 19.3% had children under the age of 18 living with them, 49.3% were married couples living together, 4.7% had a female householder with no husband present, and 43.3% were non-families. 40.0% of all households were made up of individuals, and 26.7% had someone living alone who was 65 years of age or older. The average household size was 2.00 and the average family size was 2.71.

In the village, the population was spread out, with 19.0% under the age of 18, 5.7% from 18 to 24, 19.3% from 25 to 44, 19.3% from 45 to 64, and 36.7% who were 65 years of age or older. The median age was 51 years. For every 100 females, there were 78.6 males. For every 100 females age 18 and over, there were 74.8 males.

As of 2000 the median income for a household in the village was $30,972, and the median income for a family was $43,036. Males had a median income of $32,273 versus $19,135 for females. The per capita income for the village was $17,148. About 5.5% of families and 7.5% of the population were below the poverty line, including 12.7% of those under the age of eighteen and 9.2% of those 65 or over.

== See also ==
- List of municipalities in Nebraska
