= Ainsworth, Nebraska =

City in and county seat of Brown County, Nebraska, United States

- City and County seat
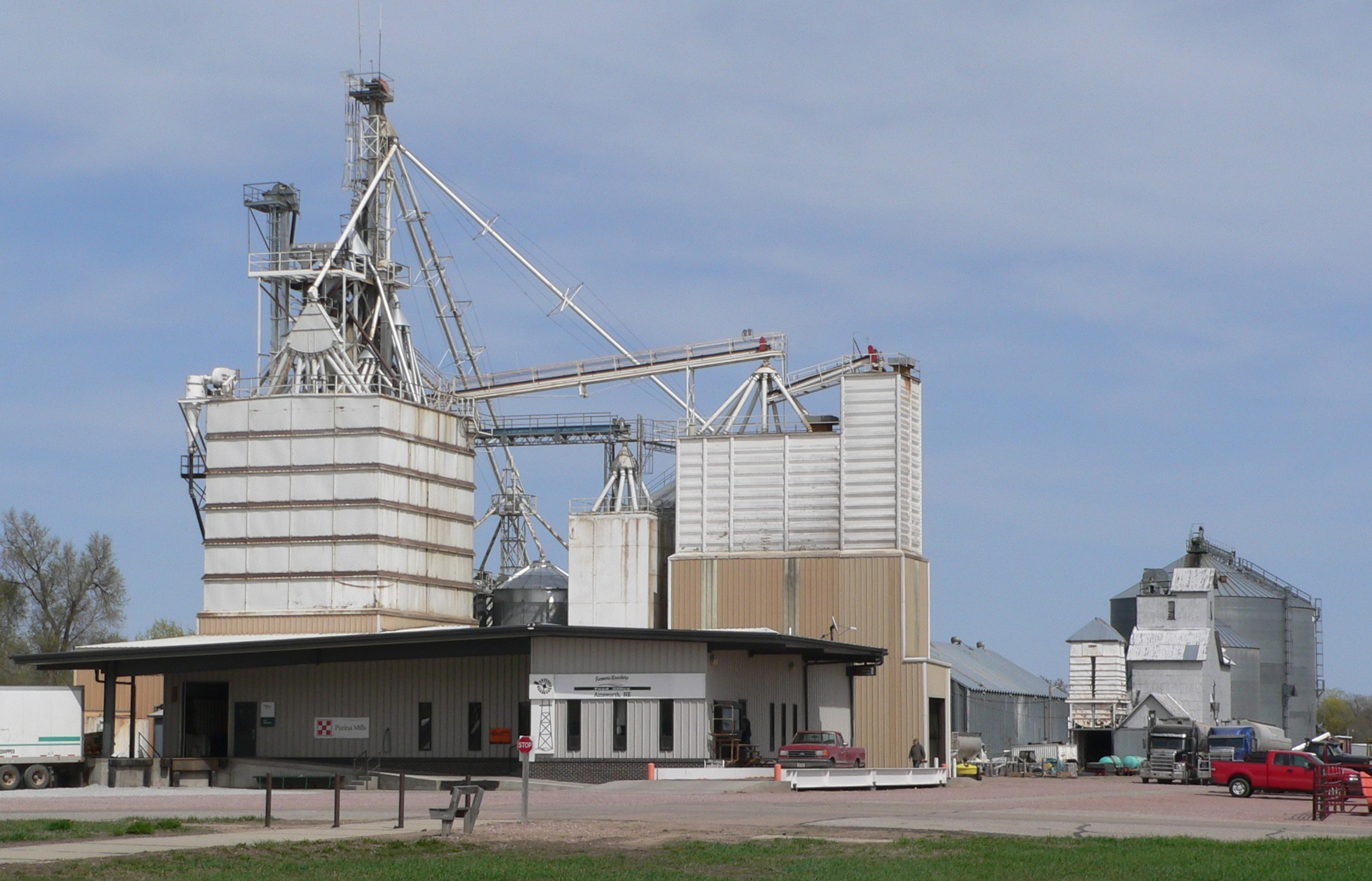
- Central Valley Ag Cooperative feed mill (2010)

- Location within Brown County and Nebraska
- Coordinates: 42°32′54″N 99°51′27″W
- Country: United States
- State: Nebraska
- County: Brown

Area
  - Total: 1.00 sq mi (2.60 km^{2})
  - Land: 1.00 sq mi (2.60 km^{2})
  - Water: 0 sq mi (0.00 km^{2})
- Elevation: 2,523 ft (769 m)

Population (2020)
  - Total: 1,616
  - Density: 1,610/sq mi (622/km^{2})
- Time zone: UTC-6 (Central (CST))
  - Summer (DST): UTC-5 (CDT)
- ZIP code: 69210
- Area code: 402
- FIPS code: 31-00415
- GNIS ID: 2393893
- Website: cityofainsworth.com

Ainsworth is a city in and the county seat of Brown County, Nebraska, United States. As of the 2020 census, its population was 1,616.

== History ==
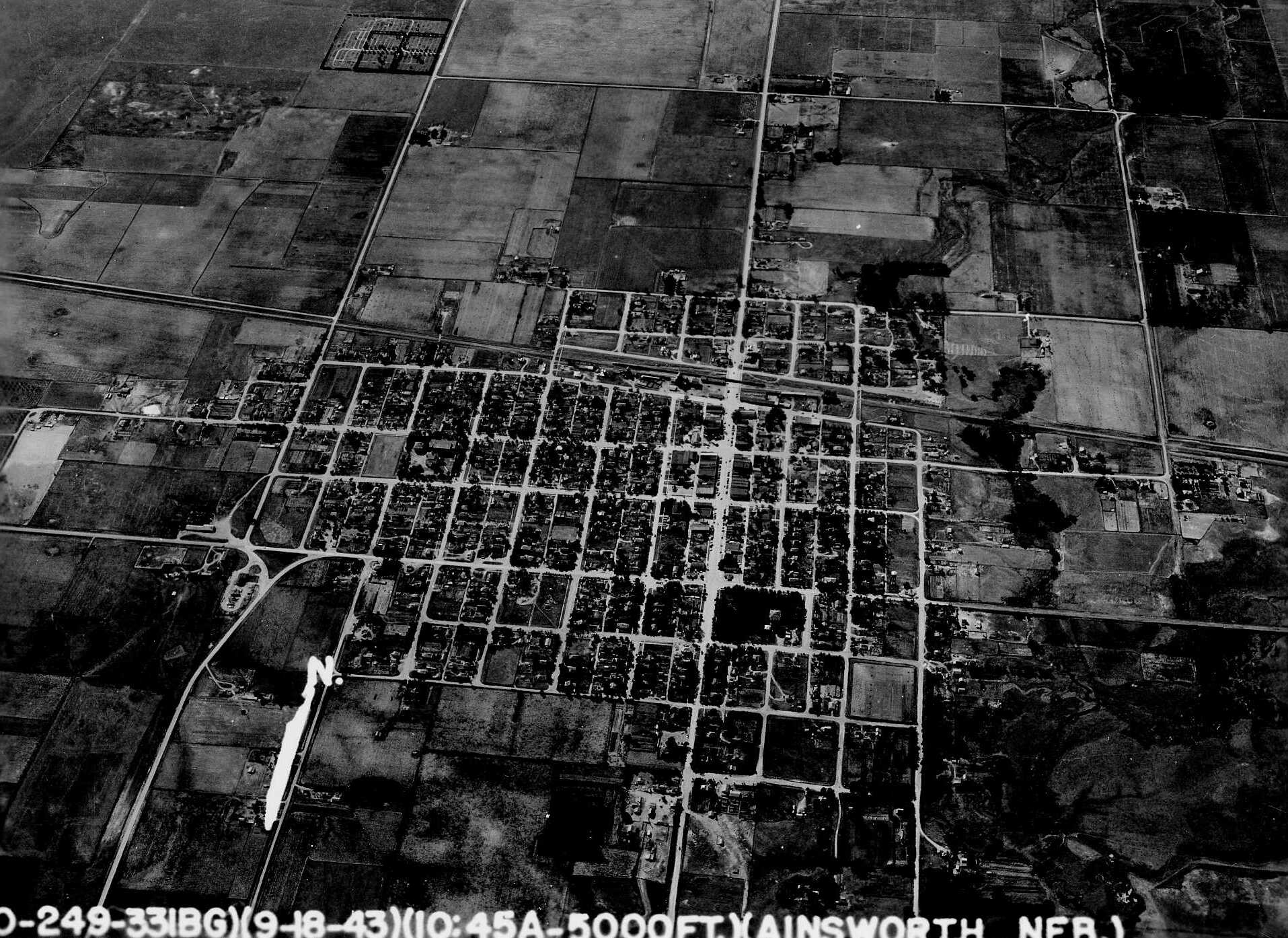
Aerial view of Ainsworth (1943)

Ainsworth was platted in 1883 when the railroad was extended to that point. It was named for James E. Ainsworth, a railroad engineer who was instrumental in building the railroad through Brown County. Ainsworth was incorporated as a village in December 1883.

In 1986 Ainsworth was the site of the World Horseshoe Pitching Championships.

== Geography ==
According to the United States Census Bureau, the city has a total area of 1.00 square mile (2.59 km^{2}), all land.

=== Climate ===
The climate in this area is characterized by hot, humid summers and generally cool to cold winters. According to the Köppen Climate Classification system, Ainsworth has a humid continental climate, abbreviated "Dfa" on climate maps.

Climate data for Ainsworth, Nebraska (1991–2020 normals, extremes 1905–present)
Month	Jan	Feb	Mar	Apr	May	Jun	Jul	Aug	Sep	Oct	Nov	Dec	Year
Record high °F (°C)	72 (22)	77 (25)	91 (33)	99 (37)	105 (41)	109 (43)	113 (45)	111 (44)	107 (42)	97 (36)	85 (29)	78 (26)	113 (45)
Mean maximum °F (°C)	59.7 (15.4)	63.5 (17.5)	74.8 (23.8)	81.8 (27.7)	88.2 (31.2)	93.1 (33.9)	99.2 (37.3)	97.0 (36.1)	92.5 (33.6)	84.9 (29.4)	73.2 (22.9)	60.2 (15.7)	100.1 (37.8)
Mean daily maximum °F (°C)	36.9 (2.7)	40.1 (4.5)	51.4 (10.8)	61.2 (16.2)	71.4 (21.9)	81.4 (27.4)	87.8 (31.0)	85.6 (29.8)	78.4 (25.8)	64.4 (18.0)	49.6 (9.8)	38.3 (3.5)	62.2 (16.8)
Daily mean °F (°C)	26.0 (−3.3)	28.9 (−1.7)	38.9 (3.8)	48.4 (9.1)	59.1 (15.1)	69.3 (20.7)	75.3 (24.1)	73.2 (22.9)	65.3 (18.5)	51.7 (10.9)	38.3 (3.5)	28.1 (−2.2)	50.2 (10.1)
Mean daily minimum °F (°C)	15.2 (−9.3)	17.6 (−8.0)	26.4 (−3.1)	35.5 (1.9)	46.8 (8.2)	57.2 (14.0)	62.9 (17.2)	60.9 (16.1)	52.1 (11.2)	39.1 (3.9)	27.0 (−2.8)	18.0 (−7.8)	38.2 (3.4)
Mean minimum °F (°C)	−8.2 (−22.3)	−4.7 (−20.4)	4.2 (−15.4)	19.2 (−7.1)	31.8 (−0.1)	45.6 (7.6)	52.2 (11.2)	49.5 (9.7)	36.1 (2.3)	20.8 (−6.2)	7.2 (−13.8)	−3.5 (−19.7)	−13.7 (−25.4)
Record low °F (°C)	−31 (−35)	−33 (−36)	−20 (−29)	−7 (−22)	14 (−10)	32 (0)	34 (1)	35 (2)	21 (−6)	0 (−18)	−15 (−26)	−30 (−34)	−33 (−36)
Average precipitation inches (mm)	0.42 (11)	0.63 (16)	1.20 (30)	2.64 (67)	3.80 (97)	3.77 (96)	3.05 (77)	2.81 (71)	2.56 (65)	1.73 (44)	0.63 (16)	0.57 (14)	23.81 (605)
Average snowfall inches (cm)	4.2 (11)	7.3 (19)	6.0 (15)	6.6 (17)	0.3 (0.76)	0.0 (0.0)	0.0 (0.0)	0.0 (0.0)	0.0 (0.0)	1.8 (4.6)	4.1 (10)	5.5 (14)	35.8 (91)
Average precipitation days (≥ 0.01 in)	5.4	6.4	6.8	9.6	11.9	11.1	9.8	8.6	6.8	7.1	4.8	5.3	93.6
Average snowy days (≥ 0.1 in)	2.8	3.8	2.9	2.2	0.2	0.0	0.0	0.0	0.0	0.6	2.1	3.2	17.8
Source: NOAA

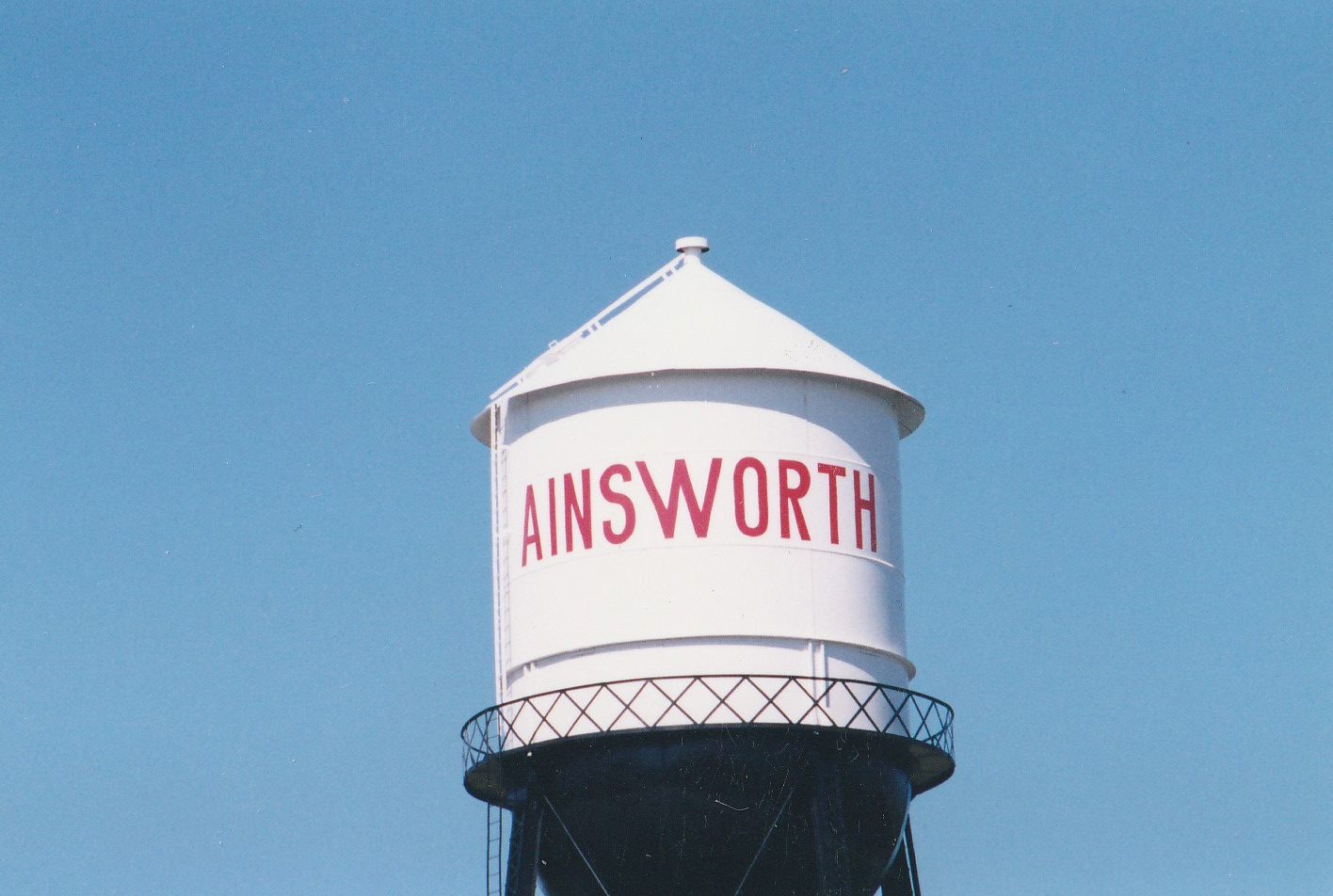
Ainworth Water Tower (2023)

== Demographics ==
Historical population
Census	Pop.	Note	%±
1890	733		—
1900	605		−17.5%
1910	1,045		72.7%
1920	1,508		44.3%
1930	1,378		−8.6%
1940	1,833		33.0%
1950	2,150		17.3%
1960	1,982		−7.8%
1970	2,073		4.6%
1980	2,256		8.8%
1990	1,870		−17.1%
2000	1,862		−0.4%
2010	1,728		−7.2%
2020	1,616		−6.5%
U.S. Decennial Census

=== 2010 census ===
As of the census of 2010, there were 1,728 people, 804 households, and 450 families living in the city. The population density was 1,728.0 inhabitants per square mile (667.2/km^{2}). There were 961 housing units at an average density of 961.0 per square mile (371.0/km^{2}). The racial makeup of the city was 97.9% White, 0.1% African American, 0.3% Native American, 0.2% Asian, 0.5% from other races, and 1.0% from two or more races. Hispanic or Latino of any race were 1.2% of the population.

There were 804 households, of which 26.2% had children under the age of 18 living with them, 44.0% were married couples living together, 7.7% had a female householder with no husband present, 4.2% had a male householder with no wife present, and 44.0% were non-families. 39.9% of all households were made up of individuals, and 21.2% had someone living alone who was 65 years of age or older. The average household size was 2.10 and the average family size was 2.83.

The median age in the city was 46.2 years. 23.1% of residents were under the age of 18; 6% were between the ages of 18 and 24; 19.7% were from 25 to 44; 26.5% were from 45 to 64; and 24.6% were 65 years of age or older. The gender makeup of the city was 46.8% male and 53.2% female.

=== 2000 census ===
As of the census of 2000, there were 1,862 people, 845 households, and 501 families living in the city. The population density was 1,879.5 inhabitants per square mile (725.7/km^{2}). There were 944 housing units at an average density of 952.9 per square mile (367.9/km^{2}). The racial makeup of the city was 98.55% White, 0.21% Native American, 0.38% Asian, 0.05% Pacific Islander, 0.21% from other races, and 0.59% from two or more races. Hispanic or Latino of any race were 0.48% of the population.

There were 845 households, out of which 26.3% had children under the age of 18 living with them, 49.9% were married couples living together, 7.7% had a female householder with no husband present, and 40.6% were non-families. 38.0% of all households were made up of individuals, and 21.9% had someone living alone who was 65 years of age or older. The average household size was 2.15 and the average family size was 2.85.

In the city, the population was spread out, with 24.2% under the age of 18, 5.5% from 18 to 24, 22.7% from 25 to 44, 21.8% from 45 to 64, and 25.9% who were 65 years of age or older. The median age was 43 years. For every 100 females, there were 86.4 males. For every 100 females age 18 and over, there were 81.7 males.

As of 2000 the median income for a household in the city was $29,357, and the median income for a family was $38,214. Males had a median income of $26,853 versus $18,750 for females. The per capita income for the city was $16,935. About 7.9% of families and 9.8% of the population were below the poverty line, including 13.0% of those under age 18 and 8.5% of those age 65 or over.

== Infrastructure ==
Ainsworth Regional Airport serves the area.

== Notable people ==
- Marvel Rea, actress in silent films
