= Western Nebraska Regional Airport =

Western Nebraska Regional Airport William B. Heilig Field

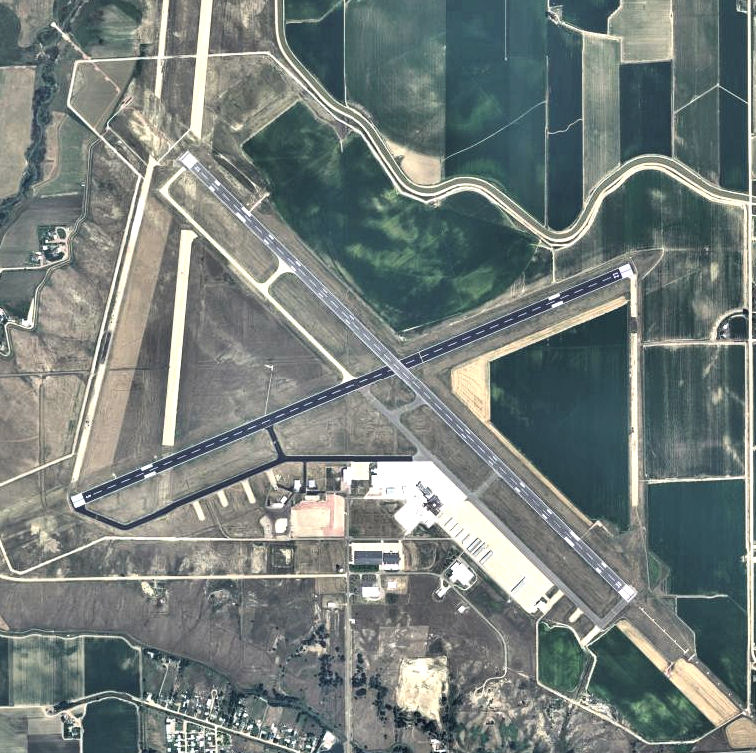
- USGS 2006 orthophoto
- IATA: BFF; ICAO: KBFF; FAA LID: BFF

Summary
- Airport type: Public
- Owner: Airport Authority of Scotts Bluff County
- Serves: Scottsbluff, Nebraska
- Location: Scotts Bluff County, Nebraska
- Elevation AMSL: 3,967 ft / 1,209 m
- Coordinates: 41°52′26″N 103°35′44″W
- Website: flyscottsbluff.com

Map

Runways
| Direction | Length | | Surface |
| Direction | ft | m | Surface |
|---|---|---|---|
| 12/30 | 8,279 | 2,523 | Asphalt |
| 5/23 | 8,002 | 2,439 | Asphalt |

Statistics
- Passengers (2020): 15,430
- Aircraft operations (12 months ending 5/31/2022): 27,897
- Based aircraft (2022): 33
- Source: Bureau of Transportation Statistics, Federal Aviation Administration

Western Nebraska Regional Airport (IATA: BFF, ICAO: KBFF, FAA LID: BFF) (William B. Heilig Field) is three miles east of Scottsbluff, in Scotts Bluff County, Nebraska. The airport is owned by the Airport Authority of Scotts Bluff County and is named after William B. Heilig. Known as "Scottsbluff's Mr. Aviation," he was a World War II United States Army Air Force primary flight instructor, a civil flight instructor, and manager of the city's airport.

It sees one passenger airline, subsidized by the Essential Air Service program. In 2016, the airport had 4,262 passenger boardings (enplanements), a 17.15% decrease from the 5,144 enplanements in 2015. The airport had 10,608 enplanements in calendar year 2008, 9,221 in 2009 and 9,864 in 2010.

The National Plan of Integrated Airport Systems for 2017–2021 categorized it as a non-primary commercial service airport.

== History ==
The original airport opened in 1934; it had a hangar, commercial airline connections, air mail service, lighted fields, a weather bureau station, and was a pilot training facility .

With the United States entry into World War II Scottsbluff promoted its municipal airport for military/defense purposes. On September 5, 1942, Scottsbluff was selected as one of seven satellite air bases in Nebraska. Twenty-eight farms were vacated so construction could begin at a cost of $5.5 million. The original Scottsbluff Municipal Airport closed to make way for the new airfield; the old airport later became a prisoner of war camp.

Construction began on September 7, 1942. A temporary railroad spur was constructed and some 600,000 cubic yards (460,000 m^{3}) of concrete for three runways was poured in forty-five days. There were about 108 buildings on the ground including barracks, mess halls, officers' quarters, warehouses, a hangar, a camouflage instruction building, and a bombsight storage building.

=== Scottsbluff Army Airfield ===
The base was occupied as early as 11 October 1942 and was assigned to Second Air Force. Initially, Scottsbluff Army Airfield was a satellite to Casper Army Air Field, Wyoming. The first troops arrived December 4, 1942. The 4190th Army Air Force Base Unit was the host organization at Scottsbluff AAF.

The original mission was to train crews of Boeing B-17 Flying Fortresses and Consolidated B-24 Liberators bombers. Crews based at Casper AAF Wyoming conducted final training at Scottsbluff. All training aircraft at the airfield were assigned to the 4190th AAFBU.

In 1944 base command was transferred from Second Air Force to the 1st Troop Carrier Command, and became a satellite field of Alliance Army Airfield. The 1st TCC used the facility training Douglas C-47 Skytrain and glider crews. Aircraft and radio maintenance personnel also trained here.

=== Civil use ===
The airfield closed on December 31, 1945, and the War Department handed over control to the City of Scottsbluff in 1947. Buildings and structures which were not part of the transfer were sold by the U.S. Government in separate agreements and most were removed. The USAF continued to use the airport for training until 1950.

Western Airlines DC-3s were at Scottsbluff by 1945 and United appeared in 1953–54; both left in 1959, replaced by Frontier, which remained until 1984.

In July 1970 Scotts Bluff County took control and has had it since. The county continues to operate the facility as the William B. Heilig Field.

In the summer of 2003 the county created an Airport Authority Board which has made major improvements: a new terminal building, wildlife fence, fire equipment, and remodeling the fire station. Future projects include runway lighting and resurfacing. The board is working with local law enforcement and the TSA for security screening.

== Facilities ==
The airport covers 1,806 acres (731 ha) at an elevation of 3,967 feet (1,209 m). It has two asphalt runways: 12/30 is 8,279 by 150 feet (2,523 x 46 m) and 5/23 is 8,002 by 150 feet (2,439 x 46 m).

In the year ending May 31, 2022 the airport had 27,897 aircraft operations, average 76 per day: 91% general aviation, 5% airline, 2% air taxi, and 1% military. 33 aircraft were then based at this airport: 28 single-engine, 4 multi-engine, and 1 ultralight.

== Airline and destination ==
| Airlines | Destinations |
|---|---|
| United Express | Denver |

Destinations map
Destinations from Western Nebraska Regional Airport

== Ground Transportation ==
As of 2022, Western Nebraska Regional Airport is not served by fixed route public transit. The nearest Tri-City Roadrunner bus stop is located over 2 miles (3.2 km) away. Demand response service to the airport is available.

== See also ==
- Nebraska World War II Army Airfields
- List of airports in Nebraska
