= Boutique Air =

Airline of the United States

IATA	ICAO	Call sign
4B	BTQ	BOUTIQUE
- Founded: 2007; 19 years ago
- Commenced operations: 2014; 12 years ago
- AOC #: 2B5A106N
- Focus cities: Boston, Portland
- Fleet size: 12
- Destinations: 4
- Headquarters: San Francisco, California, U.S.
- Key people: Shawn Simpson (founder, CEO); Brian Kondrad (VP)
- Website: www.boutiqueair.com

Boutique Air, Inc. is a commuter airline based in San Francisco, California, United States. The airline offers charter services as well as scheduled passenger services subsidized under the Essential Air Service (EAS) program. In 2019, Boutique transported over 180,000 passengers. Boutique Air has established bases for private charter services in South Florida, Las Vegas, Boston, Dallas, and Portland, OR.

== History ==
The company was founded in 2007 by Shawn Simpson, an early employee of Google. It was originally an aviation technology company before launching charter and passenger airline services.

In 2013, it received commuter air carrier authority from the United States Department of Transportation. Its first scheduled service was operated in 2013-2014 between Hawthorne Municipal Airport near Los Angeles and McCarran International Airport in Las Vegas. During that time, the company began submitting proposals to provide scheduled service to rural communities and regions under contract as part of the Essential Air Service program and began its first flights between Clovis Municipal Airport in New Mexico and Dallas/Fort Worth International Airport in July 2014. The company continues airline service to several cities and offers charter services throughout the United States, Mexico, Canada, and the Caribbean.

On August 26, 2025, the U.S. government, on behalf of the Federal Aviation Administration (FAA), sued Boutique Air for alleged violations of federal regulations governing drug and alcohol records checks on employees.

According to the lawsuit, Boutique Air is accused of allowing 18 mechanics, two pilots, and one ground security coordinator to perform "safety-sensitive" work between August 2020 and September 2021 without first obtaining or making a good-faith effort to obtain their prior drug and alcohol testing records as required by Department of Transportation regulations.

The government is seeking to enforce a civil penalty that the FAA had previously sought against the airline for these violations in 2023. The maximum allowed penalty totals $291,417. The lawsuit claims that Boutique Air has not responded to the FAA's attempts to address the violations and has not paid any of the penalty.

== Corporate affairs ==
The headquarters are at Suite 925 of 5 3rd Street, San Francisco.

The headquarters were previously at 340 Pine Street, and later in the Flatiron Building.

== Airline agreements ==
=== Interline and codeshare agreements ===
==== United Airlines ====
Boutique Air announced a new codeshare agreement with United Airlines on May 23, 2018. Customers could book their entire itinerary under a single reservation for through ticketing and baggage transfer to their final destination. MileagePlus members could also earn miles on eligible Boutique Air flights. Since Boutique had a codeshare with United Airlines, passengers with United Club memberships can access the lounge even if they are not flying with United. In late 2024, United Airlines terminated the codeshare with Boutique Air but still maintains a basic interline agreement.

==== American Airlines ====
In December 2018, Boutique launched a new interline agreement with American Airlines. Similar to the agreement with United, customers can book all flights under a single reservation for flow through ticketing and baggage transfers to their final destination.

== Boutique Car ==
In 2017, Boutique started a rental car service called 'Boutique Car'. This service provides ground transportation options for communities that have no other options and complements Boutique's EAS proposals. Two locations currently utilize this service:

- Massena, New York
- Pendleton, Oregon

== Fleet ==
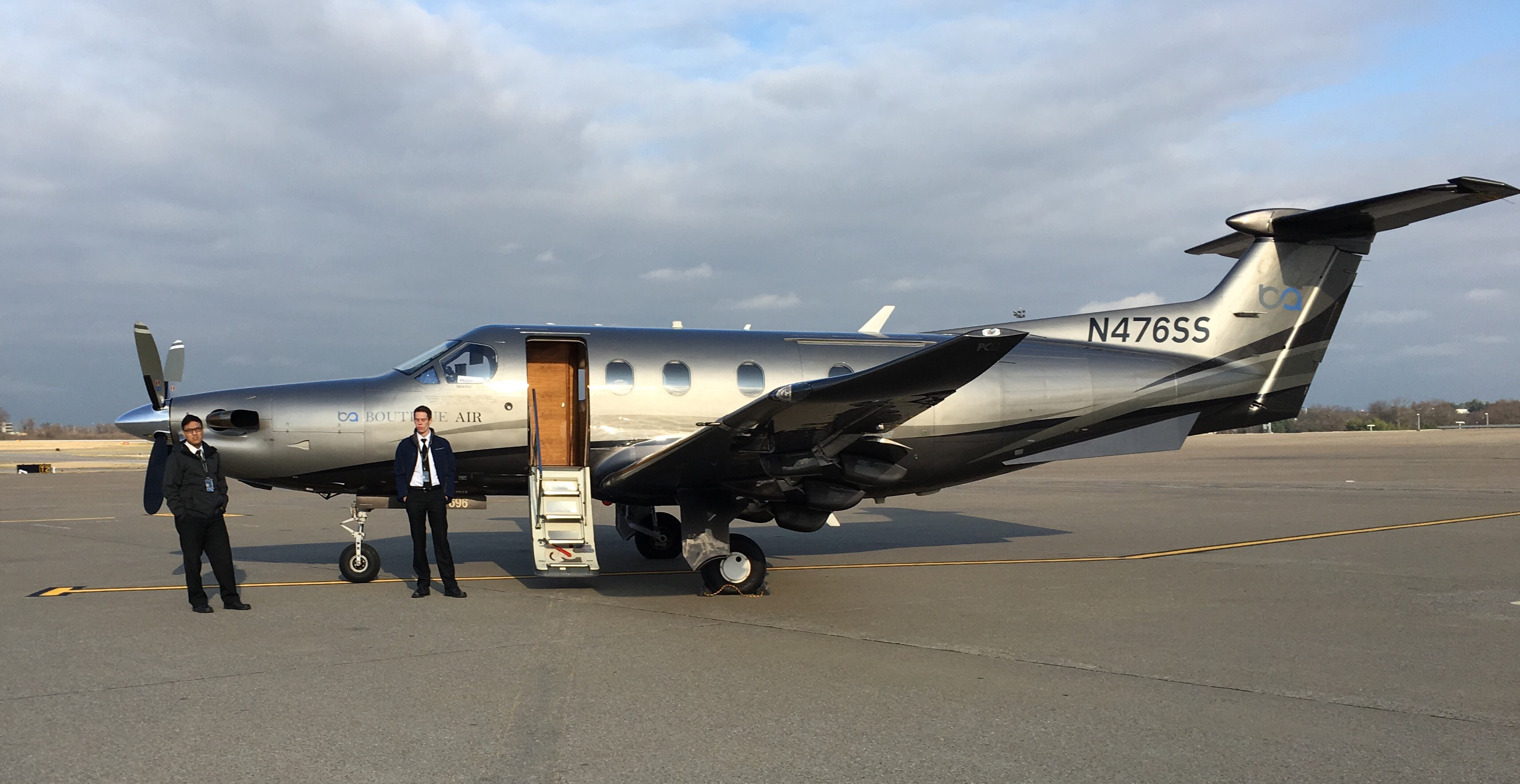
Boutique Air Pilatus PC-12

Boutique Air operates the following fleet:

Aircraft	In Fleet	Passengers	Notes
Pilatus PC-12-45	6	8	
Pilatus PC-12-47	6	8	
Total	12		

== Accidents and incidents ==
- On April 23, 2020, Boutique Flight 902, a non-revenue positioning flight of a Pilatus PC-12, aircraft registration N477SS, departed from Dallas/Fort Worth International Airport. The pilot, who was the only one on board, reported an engine problem and diverted to Mesquite Metro Airport. The engine lost power on approach and the aircraft crashed short of the runway while executing a turn. The pilot suffered serious injuries and the aircraft was damaged beyond repair. A mis-rigged cable likely caused a reduction in thrust.
- On January 21, 2021, a wheel detached from a Boutique Air flight (Flight 835) in mid-air as it was approaching O'Hare International Airport (ORD) in Chicago. The wheel landed in a Chicago family's yard.
- On May 5, 2021, a Boutique Air flight from Minneapolis, Minnesota to Ironwood, Michigan, was aborted after the airplane's emergency exit door flew off during take-off.
- On May 18, 2025, a Pilatus PC-12/47, N220JP, owned by Dragonglass LLC and operated by Boutique Air, veered off runway 17R and suffered a nose gear collapse at KHND.
