= Scribner State Airport =

Scribner State Airport Scribner Army Airfield
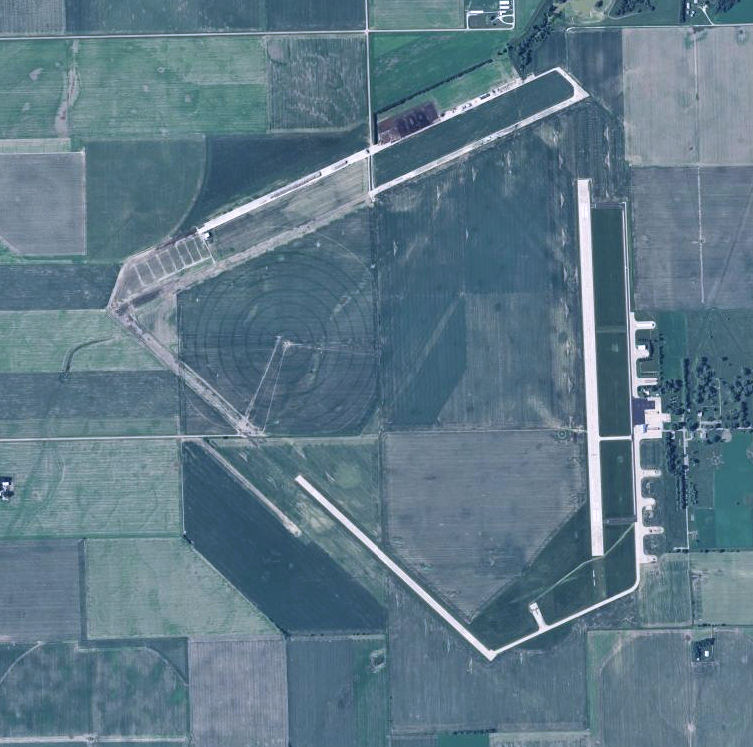
- 2006 USGS Orthophoto
- IATA: SCB; ICAO: KSCB; FAA LID: SCB

Summary
- Airport type: Public
- Owner: Nebraska Dept of Aeronautics
- Serves: Scribner, Nebraska
- Location: Everett Township, Dodge County, near Scribner, Nebraska
- Elevation AMSL: 1,325 ft / 404 m
- Coordinates: 41°36′37″N 096°37′48″W

Map
- Location

Runways
Direction	Length		Surface
Direction	ft	m	Surface
17/35	4,200	1,280	Concrete
12/30	3,199	975	Concrete

Statistics (2022)
- Aircraft operations (year ending 8/17/2022): 2,550
- Based aircraft: 12
- Source: Federal Aviation Administration

Scribner State Airport (IATA: SCB, ICAO: KSCB, FAA LID: SCB) is a public airport located approximately 3 miles (4.8 km) southeast of Scribner, in Dodge County, Nebraska.

== Facilities ==
Scribner State Airport covers 789 acres (319 ha) at an elevation of 1,325 feet (404 m). It has two concrete runways: 17/35 is 4,200 by 75 feet (1,280 x 23 m) and 12/30 is 3,199 by 60 feet (975 x 18 m).

In the year ending August 17, 2022, the airport had 2,550 aircraft operations, average 49 per week: 98% general aviation and 2% military. 12 aircraft were then based at the airport: 10 single-engine and 2 ultralight.

== History ==
Scribner State Airport was built in 1942 as a United States Army Air Forces training airfield. The 2,060-acre (8.3 km^{2}) site is south of the Elkhorn River and is surrounded by low rolling hills on the east, north and west. The area is agricultural.

The first news that Scribner Army Airfield would be built came on 1 October 1942, with eviction notices given to area farmers shortly thereafter. Construction soon began, with two runways completed by 26 November 1942. 87 buildings and structures were built. The base opened on 9 December 1942.

Scribner AAF was one of eleven training airfields in Nebraska, and came under the command of Second Air Force. It was initially a satellite base to Sioux City Army Air Base, Iowa, though by 1943 it became an independent base, with Ainsworth Army Airfield, Nebraska, being designated as Scribner's satellite. The 4316th Army Air Force Base Unit had host unit responsibilities at Scribner. In December 1942, the Base Commander was Major A. J. Guffanti.

The field's primary mission was to provide aircrew training for B-17 Flying Fortress and B-24 Liberator bomber air crews. In addition, P-47 Thunderbolt fighter pilots completed proficiency training at Scribner before reassignment to the European Theater of Operations. Crews that used Scribner Army Airfield included the following:

- 583d Bombardment Squadron (3 July-1 August 1943) (B-17 Flying Fortress)

Component of: 383d Bombardment Group, assigned to Geiger Field, Washington
Provided Operational Training at Scribner.

- 36th Fighter Group (November 1943-March 1944)

22nd, 23rd, and 53rd Fighter Squadrons (P-47 Thunderbolt)
Deployed to Ninth Air Force in England

Scribner also became a camouflage school. By 1943 the entire airfield was camouflaged to look like a farm and small village to prove that an airfield could be hidden from the enemy. The hangar was painted red to resemble a barn, chicken wire was stuffed with green colored spun glass to resemble trees, and a mock silo beside the barn really housed the sliding hangar doors. Another building was given a steeple and painted to resemble a church, and a "school house" was built with spun-glass children. Even the runways were coated with tar and coated with wood chips and ground corncobs, and painted green or brown, depending on the season.

The USAAF training airfield closed on December 31, 1945 and the State of Nebraska acquired the Airfield property from the U.S. Government in 1946. By 1951, word came that the then surplus Scribner Air Base was being considered as the site of a proposed United States Air Force Academy. This did not happen, however, the U.S. Air Force acquired 136 acres (55 ha) for installation of an ionosphere sounding station. This High Frequency radio receiver site did operate and is in fact still in operation as an unmanned annex of Offutt AFB. During this same era, some of the old WW-II era temporary barracks and administrative facilities, located near the HF receiver site, was known as "Site-X"—an emergency relocation site for Headquarters, Strategic Air Command at Offutt AFB, in use until SAC's underground command post at Offutt became operational. The detachment operated until April 30, 1959, when it was discontinued.

The remainder of the former Airfield was rented out. Nebraska Department of Aeronautics continues to operate the airfield, leasing storage and small segments of land to local concerns. A United States Air Force communications center is also located on the site.

A few wartime buildings still are in use, along with the remains of the wartime runways.

== See also ==
- Nebraska World War II Army Airfields
- List of airports in Nebraska
