= Kearney Air Force Base =

Former US Air Force base in Nebraska

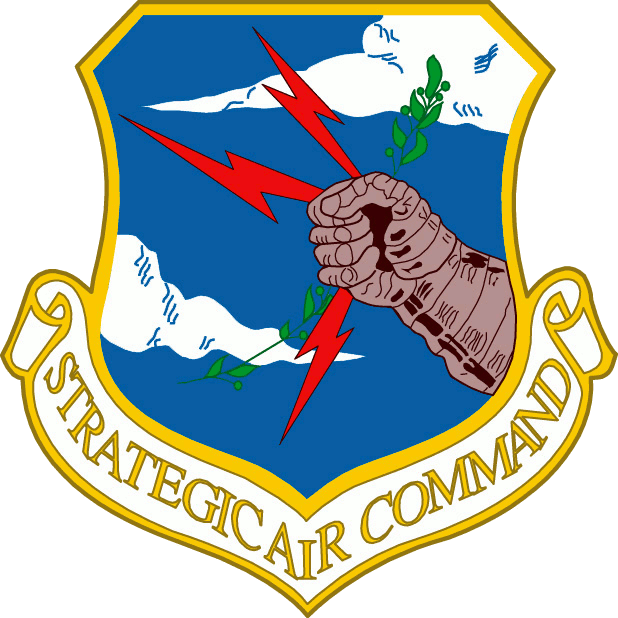
Kearney Air Force Base Kearney Army Airfield
- Part of Strategic Air Command
- Center Township, Buffalo County, near Kearney, Nebraska
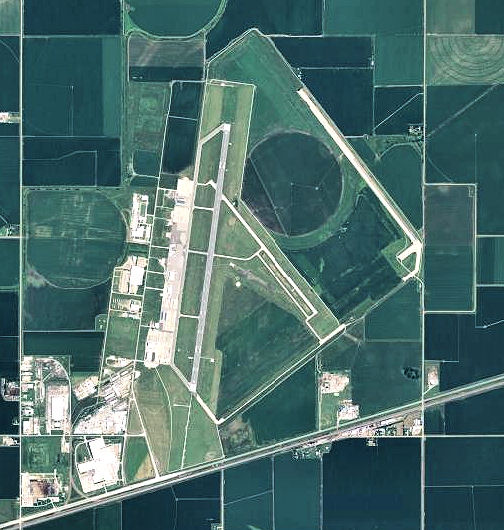
- 2006 USGS Orthophoto

Site information
- Type: Air Force Base

Location
- Coordinates: 40°43′37″N 099°00′24″W

Site history
- Built: 1941-1942
- In use: 1942-1949

Kearney Air Force Base is a former United States Army Air Forces (as Kearney Army Airfield) and United States Air Force base located near Kearney, Nebraska. It was in operation from 1942 through 1949, after which it was decommissioned and turned over for civilian use as Kearney Regional Airport.

== See also ==
- Nebraska World War II Army Airfields
