= Transportation in Colorado =

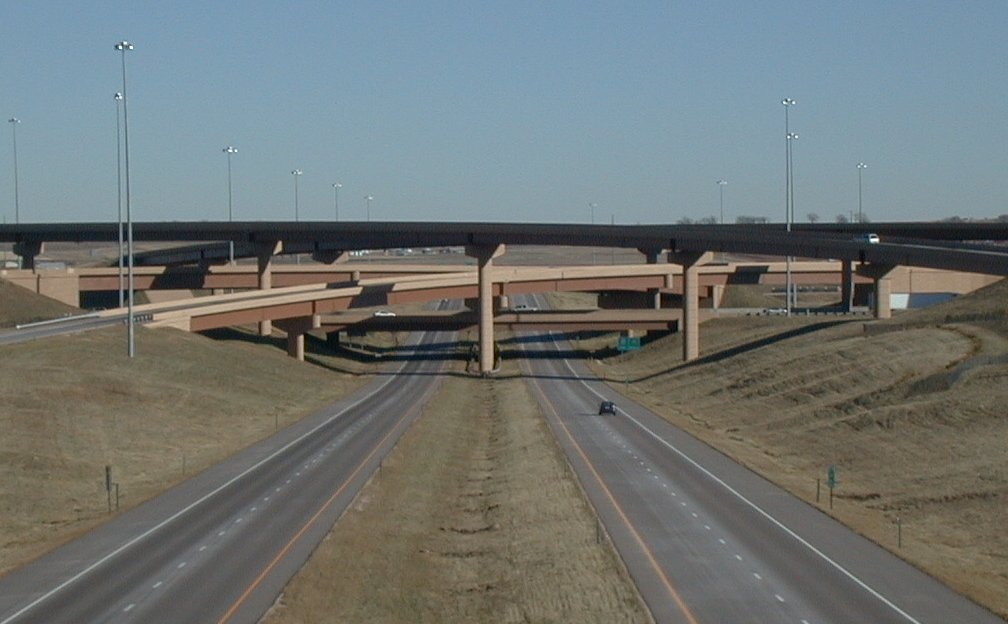
The junction of Interstate 25 and E-470

Colorado's transportation consists of a network of highway, surface street, rail, and air options. While the public transportation system in Denver is much more complex and developed than other parts of the state, tourism and growth have led to extensive needs statewide.

== Roads and highways ==
Colorado is a landlocked state, so ground and air transportation are the primary focus of the state. Also, due to low population density outside the Denver and Colorado Springs metropolitan areas, highways are the primary transportation method for most residents.

=== State highways ===
The main north–south route in Colorado is Interstate 25 (I-25). The I-25 corridor follows the front range of the Colorado Rockies and connects Denver, Colorado Springs, Pueblo, Fort Collins, Greeley, Trinidad, and other small cities. I-70 crosses Colorado from west to east and is a primary viaduct for tourists and locals to visit mountain communities. When it was completed, the section of I-70 passing through Glenwood Canyon was the most expensive section of Interstate Highway ever built in the United States with a total cost of $490 million for the 12-mile-long (19 km) stretch.

Due to winter weather conditions, sections of I-70 are regularly closed during the winter and are expensive to maintain.

Colorado maintains state highways for high-volume travel routes that not part of the two national systems.

=== Safety ===
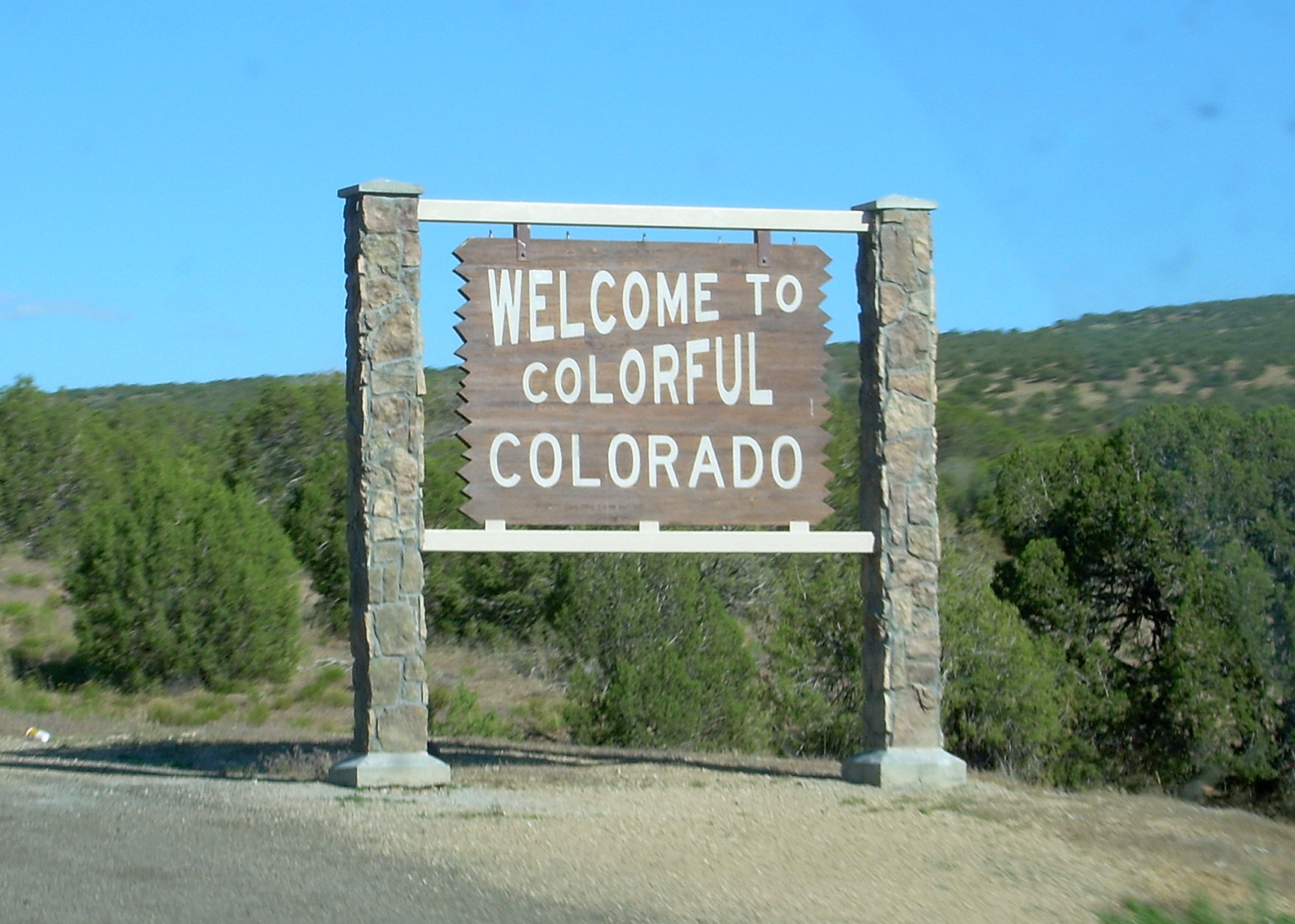
Colorado state welcome sign

In 2011, Colorado ranked among the five deadliest states for debris/litter–caused vehicle accidents per total number of registered vehicles and population size. Figures derived from the National Highway Traffic Safety Administration (NHTSA) show at least 16 persons in Colorado were killed each year in motor vehicle collisions with non-fixed objects, including debris, dumped litter, animals, and their carcasses.

In the United States, including Colorado, most civil aviation incidents are investigated by the National Transportation Safety Board (NTSB), as well as the Colorado Bureau of Investigation (CBI). When investigating an aviation disaster, NTSB investigators piece together evidence from the crash and determine the likely cause(s), whereas the CBI will also investigate if there is any involved criminal actions.

== Buses and mass transit ==
Denver's Regional Transportation District, known locally as RTD, is the largest public transportation system in Colorado. The RTD system provides bus, light rail, and commuter rail transportation services in the majority of the Denver-Aurora-Boulder Combined Statistical Area. Through its FasTracks initiative, RTD is working to rapidly build light rail and bus rapid transit.

Other transportation services exist throughout the state. Some systems, such as in Colorado Springs, focus on the local area. Other systems, such as the Roaring Fork Transportation Authority (connecting Glenwood Springs, Aspen, Carbondale, and Rifle) offer regional connections. Intercity bus service is provided by a number of carriers including Burlington Trailways, Bustang, Express Arrow, and Greyhound Lines.

Communities in Colorado with Regional Bus Service

Alamosa, Aurora, Boulder, Brush, Berthoud, Colorado Springs, Delta, Denver, Durango, Englewood, Frisco, Fort Collins, Fort Morgan, Glenwood Springs, Grand Junction, Greeley, Lamar, Limon, Longmont, Loveland, Montrose, Pueblo, Rocky Ford, Springfield, Sterling, Trinidad, Vail, and Walsenburg

- Fort Collins, Loveland, Berthoud, and Longmont are serviced by the FLEX regional bus.

== Air transportation ==
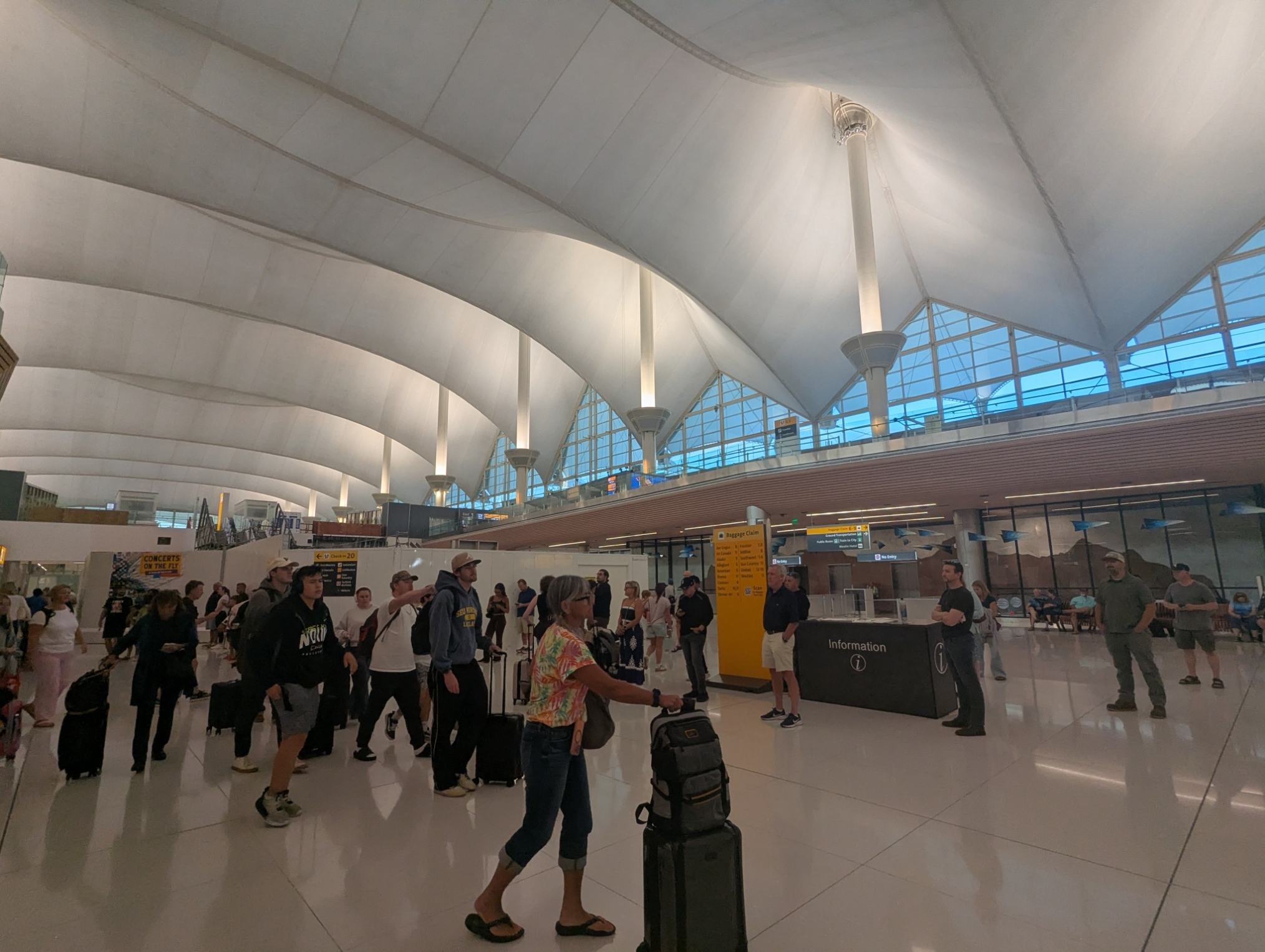
Interior of the Jeppesen Terminal at Denver International Airport, August 2026.

Denver International Airport handles the majority of air traffic in Colorado and is the fifth busiest airport in the world. Colorado Springs Airport also handles commercial flights and offers service to national destinations. The majority of other airports in the state handle on regional or private aviation needs.

Centennial Airport, located in Arapahoe County, is one of the busiest general aviation airports in the country and primarily handles private and corporate traffic.

Commercial Airports in Colorado
- ALS – San Luis Valley Regional Airport
- ASE – Aspen-Pitkin County Airport
- CEZ – Cortez Municipal Airport
- COS – City of Colorado Springs Municipal Airport
- DEN – Denver International Airport
- DRO – Durango-La Plata County Airport
- EGE – Eagle County Regional Airport
- FNL – Fort Collins-Loveland Municipal Airport
- GJT – Grand Junction Regional Airport
- GUC – Gunnison-Crested Butte Regional Airport
- HDN – Yampa Valley Airport
- MTJ – Montrose Regional Airport
- PUB – Pueblo Memorial Airport
- TEX – Telluride Regional Airport

== Rail transportation ==
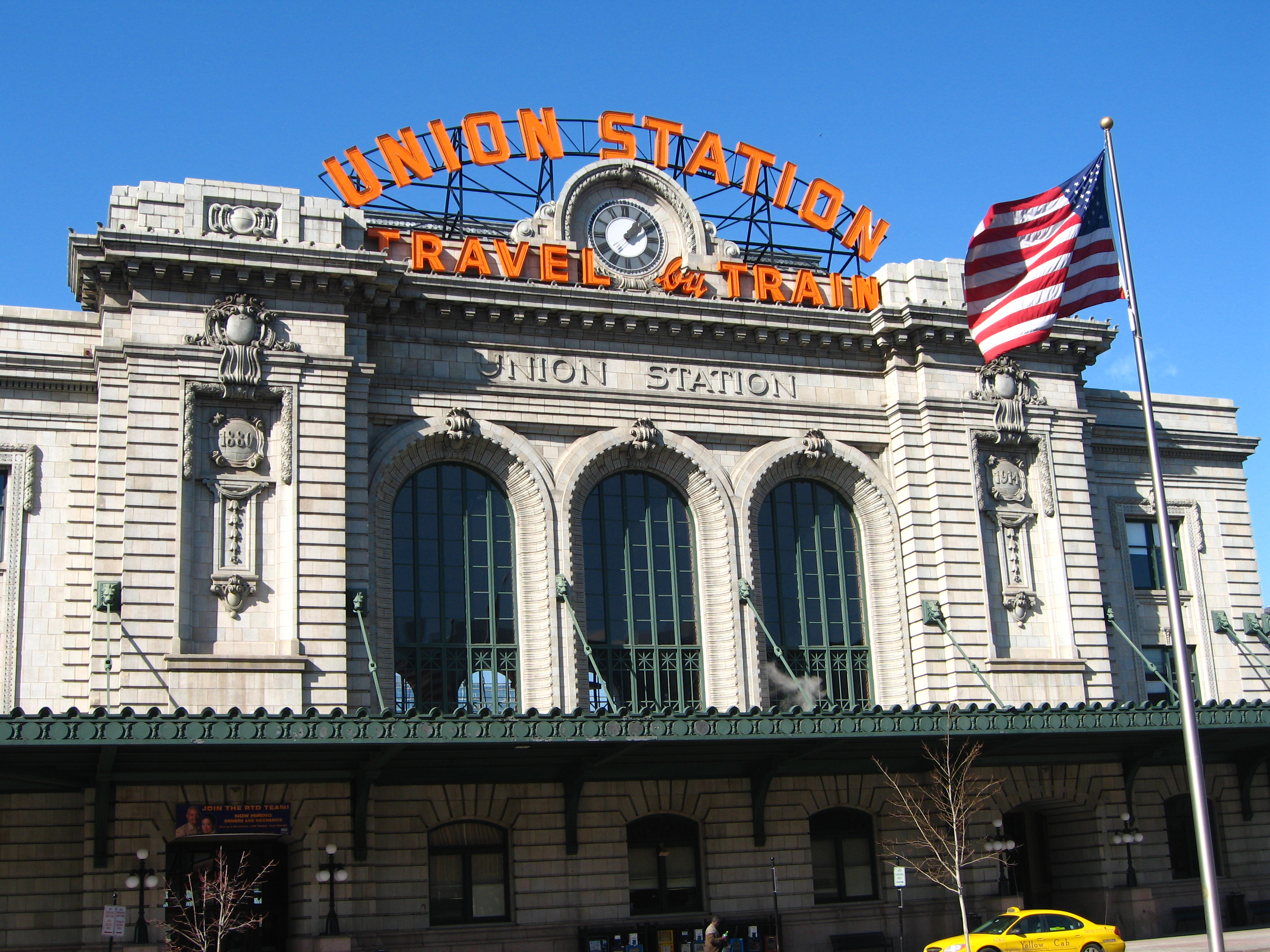
Union Station in Denver.

The Union Pacific Central Corridor begins north of Denver, passing through the Moffat Tunnel at the Continental Divide.

Denver's Regional Transportation District operates a commuter rail and light rail system serving local transit needs.

Amtrak operates two long-distance passenger train routes through Colorado—the California Zephyr and Southwest Chief—as well as the Winter Park Express seasonal ski train. Front Range Passenger Rail service on the I-25 corridor between Fort Collins and Pueblo is under development.

Passenger rail routes in Colorado
- Amtrak
  - California Zephyr: Chicago, Galesburg, Omaha, Fort Morgan, Denver, Winter Park, Granby, Glenwood Springs, Grand Junction, Salt Lake City, Reno, Sacramento, and Emeryville
  - Southwest Chief: Chicago, Galesburg, Kansas City, Topeka, Lamar, La Junta, Trinidad, Raton, Lamy, Albuquerque, Gallup, Flagstaff, and Los Angeles
  - Winter Park Express: Denver Union Station, Winter Park Resort
- Regional Transportation District
  - Commuter rail
    - (Union Station to Denver Airport)
    - (Union Station to Westminster)
    - (Union Station to Wheat Ridge/Ward)
    - (Union Station to Eastlake/124th • Thornton)
  - Light rail
    - (18th & California to Littleton-Mineral)
    - (Union Station to RidgeGate Parkway)
    - (18th & California to Florida)
    - (16th and Stout to 30th & Downing)
    - (Lincoln to Peoria)
    - (Union Station to Jefferson County Government Center • Golden)

== See also ==
- Plug-in electric vehicles in Colorado
