= List of Boutique Air destinations =

Boutique Air serves the following destinations:

City	Airport	IATA Code	Destinations	Notes
Massachusetts
Boston	Boston Logan International Airport	BOS	Massena	
New York
Massena	Massena International Airport	MSS	Boston	Boutique Car location
Oregon
Pendleton	Eastern Oregon Regional Airport	PDT	Portland	2016-2030, Boutique Car location
Portland	Portland International Airport	PDX	Pendleton	Operates in a private terminal; complimentary shuttle offered to main terminal.

== Former destinations ==
City	Airport	IATA Code	Destinations	Notes
Arizona
Phoenix	Phoenix Sky Harbor International Airport	PHX	Cortez Las Vegas-Henderson Palm Springs Prescott Show Low Silver City	Focus City
Prescott	Ernest A. Love Field	PRC	Phoenix	Service was provided with no subsidy
Show Low	Show Low Regional Airport	SOW	Phoenix	Southern Airways Express awarded contract
Alabama
Muscle Shoals	Northwest Alabama Regional Airport	MSL	Atlanta Nashville Pensacola	Contour Airlines awarded contract
California
Hawthorne	Hawthorne Municipal Airport	HHR	Las Vegas	
Inyokern	Inyokern Airport	IYK	Los Angeles	Ended due to low demand
Los Angeles	Los Angeles International Airport	LAX	Inyokern Merced Palm Springs	
Merced	Merced Municipal Airport	MCE	Sacramento Los Angeles	Contract awarded to Advanced Air
Oakland	Oakland International Airport	OAK	Merced	Ended due to low demand, changed to daily Sacramento service.
Palm Springs	Palm Springs International Airport	PSP	Los Angeles Phoenix-Sky Harbor	
Sacramento	Sacramento International Airport	SMF	Merced	
Colorado
Alamosa	San Luis Valley Regional Airport	ALS	Albuquerque Denver	Former Boutique Car Location | SkyWest awarded contract
Cortez	Cortez Municipal Airport	CEZ	Denver Phoenix Telluride	Former Boutique Car Location | Denver Air Connection awarded contract
Denver	Denver International Airport	DEN	Alamosa Alliance Chadron Cortez Dodge City McCook Moab Telluride Vernal	Hub
Telluride	Telluride Regional Airport	TEX	Cortez (Seasonal) Denver (Seasonal)	
Florida
Pensacola	Pensacola International Airport	PNS	Muscle Shoals	
Georgia
Atlanta	Hartsfield–Jackson Atlanta International Airport	ATL	Greenville Jackson (TN) Muscle Shoals	
Illinois
Chicago	Chicago-O'Hare International Airport	ORD	Ironwood Sault Ste. Marie (seasonal)	
Kansas
Dodge City	Dodge City Regional Airport	DDC	Denver	SkyWest awarded contract
Louisiana
New Orleans	Louis Armstrong New Orleans International Airport	MSY	Greenville (MS)	
Maryland
Baltimore	Baltimore/Washington International Airport	BWI	Altoona Johnstown Massena Norfolk	Focus City
Michigan
Ironwood	Gogebic-Iron County Airport	IWD	Chicago-O'Hare Minneapolis-St. Paul	Boutique Car Location | Denver Air Connection awarded contract after multiple incidents initiated a search for a new carrier. DAC launches service on the route starting Oct. 1, 2021.
Sault Ste Marie	Chippewa County International Airport	CIU	Chicago O'Hare	Non-subsidized
Minnesota
Minneapolis	Minneapolis/St Paul International Airport	MSP	Ironwood Thief River Falls	
Thief River Falls	Thief River Falls Regional Airport	TVF	Minneapolis-St. Paul	Former Boutique Car Location | Denver Air Connection awarded contract
Mississippi
Greenville	Mid Delta Regional Airport	GLH	Atlanta Dallas-Ft. Worth Nashville New Orleans	Boutique Car Location | Contour Airlines awarded AEAS contract
Missouri
St. Louis	St. Louis Lambert International Airport	STL	Jackson	
Nebraska
Alliance	Alliance Municipal Airport	AIA	Chadron Denver	Former Boutique Car Location | Denver Air Connection awarded contract
Chadron	Chadron Municipal Airport	CDR	Alliance Denver	Southern Airways Express awarded contract
McCook	McCook Ben Nelson Regional Airport	MCK	Denver	Denver Air Connection awarded contract
New Mexico
Albuquerque	Albuquerque International Sunport	ABQ	Alamosa Carlsbad Clovis Los Alamos Silver City	
Carlsbad	Cavern City Air Terminal	CNM	Albuquerque Dallas El Paso	Former Boutique Car Location | Advanced Air awarded contract
Clovis	Clovis Municipal Airport	CVN	Albuquerque Dallas	Former Boutique Car Location | Operated on the King Air 350 | Denver Air Connection awarded contract
Los Alamos	Los Alamos County Airport	LAM	Albuquerque	Lack of enplanements, community decided to designate Santa Fe Regional Airport for passenger service
Silver City	Grant County Airport	SVC	Albuquerque Phoenix	Former Boutique Car Location | Advanced Air won contract
New York
Albany	Albany International Airport	ALB	Massena	Changed Massena service to focus on daily Boston flights
Nevada
Henderson	Henderson Executive Airport	HSH	Merced Phoenix	Ended due to demand for McCarran service
Las Vegas	McCarran International Airport	LAS	Merced	
Oregon
Redmond/Bend	Roberts Field	RDM	Portland	
Pennsylvania
Altoona	Altoona–Blair County Airport	AOO	Baltimore Pittsburgh	Boutique Car Location | Contour Airlines awarded AEAS contract
Johnstown	Johnstown–Cambria County Airport	JST	Baltimore Pittsburgh	Johnstown is a maintenance base for Boutique's Northeast operations, employing over twenty locals from the community | SkyWest awarded contract
Pittsburgh	Pittsburgh International Airport	PIT	Altoona Johnstown	
South Dakota
Rapid City	Rapid City Regional Airport	RAP	Chadron	Non-subsidized service
Tennessee
Jackson	McKellar–Sipes Regional Airport	MKL	Atlanta St. Louis	Community choose Southern Airways Express contract to begin June 1, 2022 due to a lack of reliability
Nashville	Nashville International Airport	BNA	Greenville Muscle Shoals	
Texas
El Paso	El Paso International Airport	ELP	Carlsbad	Non-subsidized service
Houston	George Bush Intercontinental Airport	IAH	Victoria	
Victoria	Victoria Regional Airport	VCT	Dallas-Fort Worth Houston-Intercontinental	SkyWest awarded contract
Utah
Moab	Canyonlands Field	CNY	Denver Salt Lake City	SkyWest awarded contract
Salt Lake City	Salt Lake City International Airport	SLC	Moab Vernal	
Vernal	Vernal Regional Airport	VEL	Denver Salt Lake City	SkyWest awarded contract
Vermont
Burlington	Burlington International Airport	BTV	Boston (Seasonal)	Ended due to staffing issues
Virginia
Washington	Washington Dulles International Airport	IAD	Massena	Changed Massena service to focus on daily Boston flights.
Norfolk/Virginia Beach	Norfolk International Airport	ORF	Baltimore	
