= KMTJ =

KMTJ may refer to:

- KMTJ (FM), a radio station (90.5 FM) licensed to Columbus, Montana, United States
- Montrose Regional Airport (ICAO code KMTJ)
