= Statue of Jack Swigert =

Bronze sculpture installed in Washington, D.C.

John L. "Jack" Swigert, Jr.
- The statue in the United States Capitol Visitor Center
- Artist: George Lundeen; Mark Lundeen
- Medium: Bronze sculpture
- Subject: Jack Swigert
- Location: Washington, D.C., United States

John L. "Jack" Swigert, Jr., a bronze sculpture depicting NASA astronaut Jack Swigert by George and Mark Lundeen, is installed in the United States Capitol Visitor Center's Emancipation Hall in Washington, D.C. as part of the National Statuary Hall Collection. The U.S. state of Colorado donated the statue in 1997. A duplicate resides in Concourse B of Denver International Airport. George Lundeen said in 2002 that it is an artwork that he is particularly proud of.

Swigert flew around the Moon during the 1970 Apollo 13 mission.

== See also ==
- 1997 in art
