= Grand Junction Regional Airport =

Grand Junction Regional Airport Walker Field

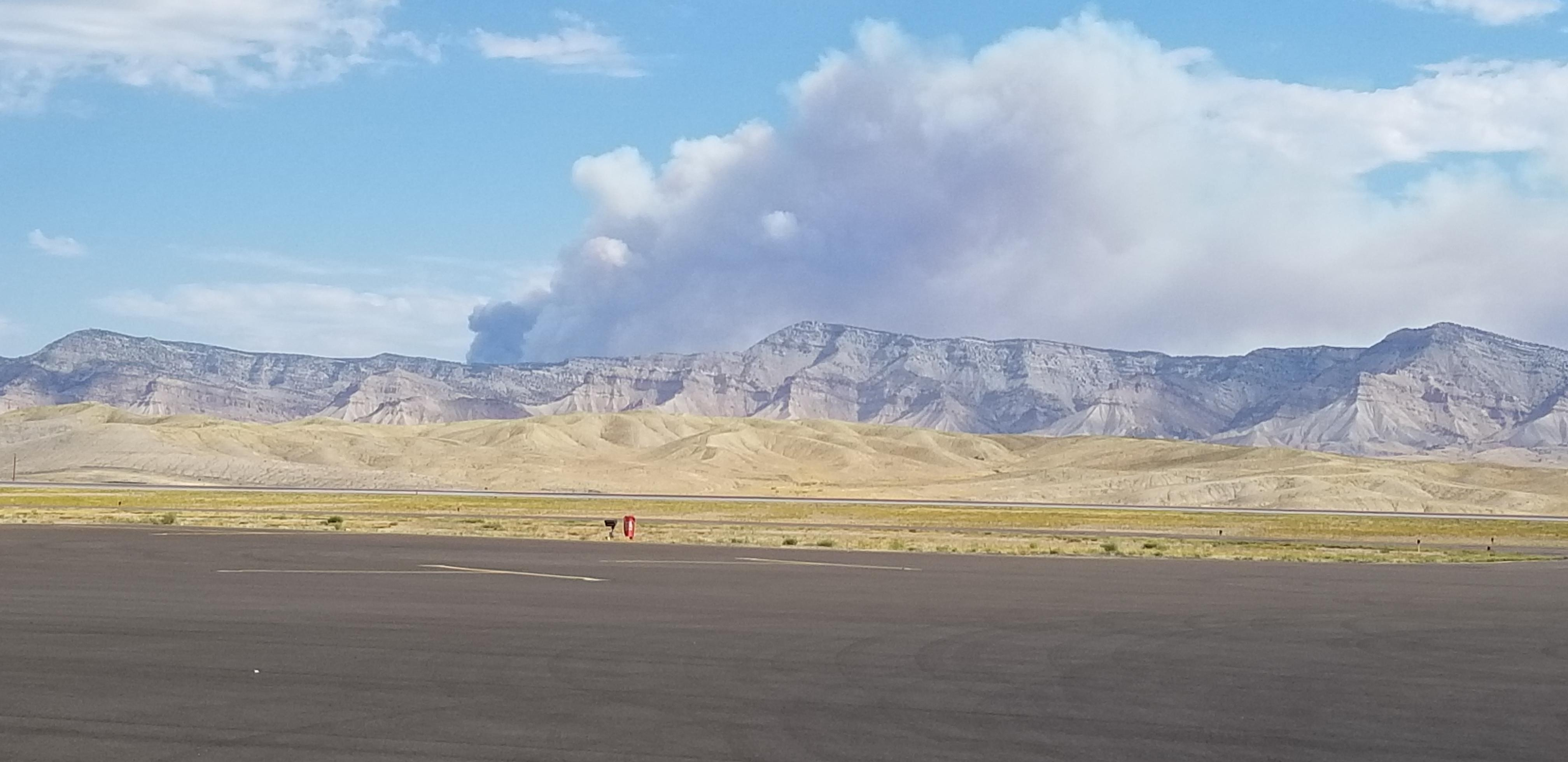
- IATA: GJT; ICAO: KGJT; FAA LID: GJT; WMO: 72476

Summary
- Airport type: Public
- Owner: Grand Junction Regional Airport Authority
- Location: Grand Junction, Colorado
- Opened: 1930
- Time zone: MST (UTC−07:00)
  - Summer (DST): MDT (UTC−06:00)
- Elevation AMSL: 4,861 ft (1,482 m)
- Coordinates: 39°07′21″N 108°31′36″W
- Website: gjairport.com

Maps
- FAA airport diagram
- Interactive map of Grand Junction Regional Airport

Runways
Direction	Length		Surface
Direction	ft	m	Surface
11/29	9,339	2,847	Asphalt
04/22	5,501	1,677	Asphalt

Statistics
- Aircraft operations (2021): 56,343
- Based aircraft (2021): 171
- Total passengers served (2019): 548,878
- Sources: airport website and FAA

Grand Junction Regional Airport (IATA: GJT, ICAO: KGJT, FAA LID: GJT) is three miles (4.8 km) northeast of Grand Junction, in Mesa County, Colorado, United States. The airport is owned by the Grand Junction Regional Airport Authority.

Federal Aviation Administration records show the airport served 212,588 passengers in the 2008 calendar year with passenger traffic increasing steadily (with the exception of COVID-related disruptions) to a total service of 482,773 passengers in the 2023 calendar year. In 2023, the Bureau of Transportation Statistics ranked the airport as the 5th busiest in the state of Colorado, behind the Denver, Colorado Springs, Aspen, and Montrose airports (although during this calendar year, Grand Junction served nearly the same passenger volume as the Montrose Regional Airport, with the airports being ranked as the 180th and 181st busiest airports in the country, each with approximately 244,000 enplanements).

The Federal Aviation Administration (FAA) National Plan of Integrated Airport Systems for 2023–2027 categorized it as a non-hub primary commercial service facility.

== History ==
The airport opened in 1930 as Grand Junction Municipal Airport. In 1942 it was renamed Walker Field for Walter Walker, a former publisher of The Daily Sentinel newspaper who helped obtain funds and business support for the airport. The airport and the airport authority were renamed on May 15, 2007.

In 2024, the airport was awarded $40.5 million ($35.4 million of which came from the FAA's AIP) which will go primarily towards the replacement and relocation of Runway 11/29, replacement of two aging passenger loading bridges, the purchase of a new aircraft rescue and fire fighting truck, and other infrastructure rehabilitation. The project aims to have the new runway operational by 2030, with the present primary Runway 11/29 being converted into a taxiway.

As of 2025, the airport's Executive Director, Angela Padalecki, has also indicated the airport is in the process of concept design, building specifications, and cost estimations for a terminal expansion which they hope to begin the initial construction phases on in 2026 or 2027.

In August 2025, the Federal Aviation Administration’s Airport Improvement Program awarded the Grand Junction Regional Airport $12.5 million for runway replacement and expansion projects, part of more than $150 million in grants the airport has received since 2018, with completion expected in 2029 to support travel, tourism, economic development, and wildfire-suppression efforts on the Western Slope.

== Terminal ==
Inside the terminal, the passenger waiting area has a gift shop and TV monitors. The terminal has three gates with jet bridges for regional jets; one other gate uses outdoor mobile boarding stairs. Gate 4 is primarily used for flights being serviced by smaller regional jets (such as the CRJ700), while gate 1 is primarily used for larger regional jets (such as the A220 or E175) and gate 6 is primarily used for mainline narrow-body jets (such as the Boeing 737 or A320).

Tailwind Concessions provides food and beverages and operates a small gift shop inside the terminal.

== Facilities ==
The airport covers 2,357 acres (954 ha) at an elevation of 4,861 feet (1,482 m). It has two asphalt runways: 11/29 is 9,339 by 150 feet (2,847 m × 46 m) and 4/22 is 5,501 by 75 feet (1,677 m × 23 m).

In 2021 the airport saw 56,343 aircraft operations, averaging 154 per day: 70% general aviation, 14% air taxi, 12% airline, and 4% military. On December 29, 2022, 171 aircraft were based at this airport: 130 single-engine, 35 multi-engine, 4 jet, and 2 helicopter.

== Airlines and destinations ==
=== Passenger ===
Airlines	Destinations
American Eagle	Dallas/Fort Worth, Phoenix–Sky Harbor; Seasonal: Los Angeles (begins May 27, 2027)
Breeze Airways	Las Vegas
Delta Connection	Salt Lake City
United Airlines	Denver
United Express	Denver

Destinations map
Destinations from Grand Junction Regional Airport
Red = Year-round destination
Green = Seasonal destination
Blue = Future destination

== Statistics ==
=== Top domestic destinations ===
Top domestic destinations from GJT (October 2024 - September 2025)
Rank	Airport	Passengers	Airline(s)
1	Denver, Colorado	150,460	United
2	Phoenix, Arizona	56,680	American
3	Dallas/Fort Worth, Texas	56,240	American
4	Salt Lake City, Utah	18,610	Delta
5	Las Vegas, Nevada	9,580	Breeze
6	Santa Ana, California	7,820	Breeze

== Historical airline service ==
The first airline service at Grand Junction was by Western Airlines flying Douglas DC-4s on a Los Angeles - Las Vegas - Grand Junction - Denver route. Western soon sold this route to United Airlines in 1947 which continued the service using DC-4s but soon upgraded with Douglas DC-6s and, by the late 1960s, to Boeing 727-100 jets. GJT's runway was extended from 5400 ft to 7500 ft around 1965 and the airport then became the primary jet airport to serve the Aspen ski area. United started Saturday-only nonstops in the winter ski season to Los Angeles in the winter of 1969-70 and to Chicago and San Francisco in the 1970-71 ski season. GJT was the only airport in Colorado west of Denver that saw major airline jet service until Durango upgraded their runway in 1977. United's winter ski season flights ended after the 1981/82 season. Boeing 727-100 and Douglas DC-8 jet aircraft were used with some flights operating with the stretch version of the DC-8 called the DC-8-61. In mid-1980 United began a daily, year-round, nonstop flight to Los Angeles using Boeing 737-200s but dropped the flights to Denver and Las Vegas. One year later United discontinued the LAX flight which ended all service to GJT however United returned in mid-1982 with flights to Denver. Service ended once again in 1984. A new service to Denver entitled United Express began in 1987 and is noted below.

Monarch Airlines began flights in 1947 by serving Grand Junction as one of many stops on a route between Salt Lake City and Albuquerque. Flights to Denver were soon added and the carrier also used Douglas DC-3s. Successor Frontier Airlines (1950–1986) then served Grand Junction using DC-3s and upgrading with Convair 340s in the late 1950s and Convair 580s by the early 1960s. Frontier began the first jets at Grand Junction with Boeing 727-100s flying DEN-GJT-SLC and back starting in October 1966. Some Frontier 727 flights flew direct to Kansas City and St. Louis. Boeing 737-200s later replaced Frontier's 727s by 1972 and their Convair 580s remained until 1982. Direct flights to Albuquerque ended in 1978 and to Salt Lake City ended in 1981. Frontier started ski season weekend-only 737s to Dallas beginning with the 1972/73 ski season and continuing through the 1979/80 season. Weekend ski season fights then operated to Los Angeles and Oakland for the 1981/82 and 1982/83 seasons. There was no ski service for the 1983/84 season, and the final year of ski flights was the 1984/85 season with nonstop flights to Dallas/Fort Worth, Houston, and Los Angeles.

Western Airlines returned to GJT operating Saturday only ski season flights to San Francisco beginning with the 1974/75 season. Western flew Boeing 737-200s. Service ended after the 1978/79 season but returned for the 1982/83 and 1983/84 seasons with Boeing 727-200 flights to Los Angeles, Salt Lake City, and San Francisco.

Several commuter airlines also served GJT in the 1970s. These include Western Air Stages with flights to Aspen, Steamboat Springs, and Vail, as well as Salt Lake City, Moab, and Vernal in Utah. In 1976 the carrier flew a GJT-Cortez-Farmington route. Sun Valley Key flew a GJT-Moab-Price-Salt Lake City route, and Bonanza Airlines and Air Colorado flew from GJT to Aspen late in the decade.

Continental Airlines began service to Denver in 1980 flying Boeing 727-100s, 727-200s, 737-200s, Douglas DC-9-10s, and DC-9-30s. Service began transitioning to commuter airlines operating as Continental Express on behalf of Continental in 1988 and Continental mainline jets ended in 1994. Continental Express service ended in 1995 when Continental ended their hub operation at Denver.

Transwestern Airlines, a commuter airline, began nonstop flights to Salt Lake City in 1979. Transwestern merged into Horizon Air in 1984 but ended service in 1985.

Mesa Airlines operated commuter flights to Farmington and Albuquerque in 1980 and again in the early 1990s. Flights to Denver began in 1990 as United Express and flights to Phoenix began in 1991, changing to America West Express in 1992 (further noted below).

Rocky Mountain Airways and Pioneer Airlines both provided service to Denver in 1984 and 1985. Pioneer operated as Continental Commuter on behalf of Continental Airlines.

Beginning in the mid-1980s, GJT began to see a series of commuter and regional airlines operate on behalf of major airlines. These airlines operated a variety of turboprop aircraft including the Convair 580, Fairchild Swearingen Metroliner, Beechcraft 1900, Embraer EMB 120 Brasilia, De Havilland Canada Dash 7 and Dash 8, Dornier 328, and ATR 42. By the late 1990s the carriers serving GJT began upgrading with regional jets including the British Aerospace 146, Bombardier CRJ100/200 and CRJ700, and the Embraer ERJ145 and E175.

SkyWest Airlines began service to Salt Lake City in 1984 as an independent commuter airline. In 1986 SkyWest teamed up with Western Airlines to operate as Western Express and the following year Western merged into Delta Air Lines changing SkyWest's designation to Delta Connection. This service on behalf of Delta still operates as of 2021.

America West Airlines began nonstop flights to Phoenix in 1985 using Boeing 737-200 jets. Some flights later began stopping in Durango and nonstop flights to Las Vegas were briefly added in 1990. All service ended in 1991 but returned in late 1992 as America West Express operated by Mesa Airlines. In 2007 America West merged into US Airways at which time the Phoenix flights began operating as US Airways Express. In 2015 US Airways merged into American Airlines and the Phoenix flights then began operating as American Eagle. This service continues as of 2021.

United Express service to Denver on behalf of United Airlines began in 1987 and continues as of 2021. Many regional and commuter carriers have operated as United Express including Aspen Airways, Mesa Airlines, Great Lakes Airlines, Air Wisconsin, ExpressJet, Trans States Airlines, GoJet Airlines, Republic Airways, and SkyWest Airlines. By 2010 all service to Denver had been upgraded with regional jets however between 2013 and 2017, some United Express flights were operated with Dash 8 Q400 turboprops. Summer seasonal nonstop flights to Chicago's O'Hare International Airport on Saturdays only began in 2020.

Air21 flew nonstop to Colorado Springs and Las Vegas and direct to Los Angeles using Fokker F28 Fellowship jets for a brief time in 1996 and 1997.

Maverick Airways, a very short-lived carrier operating De Havilland Canada Dash 7 aircraft, provided service to Denver for a brief time in 1997.

Great Lakes Airlines started serving GJT with flights to Denver in 1998 as United Express but reverted to its own branding in 2002. The Denver flights continued until 2008.

Allegiant Air began flights on two days per week to Las Vegas in 2006 using McDonnell Douglas MD-80 jets. Flights to Los Angeles were added in 2009 also operating twice per week and now operate on a seasonal basis. Flights to the Phoenix–Mesa Gateway Airport began in 2019 and to Santa Ana, California in 2021. The carrier switched from MD-80s to Airbus A319 aircraft in the late 2010s.

American Eagle began nonstop flights to Dallas/Fort Worth in 2008. Flights to Phoenix were added in 2015 with the merger of US Airways (noted above). Both services continue as of 2021. Summer seasonal nonstop flights to Los Angeles on Saturdays only are planned to begin in 2021. Carriers operating as American eagle include Envoy Air, Mesa Airlines, and SkyWest Airlines.

The new Frontier Airlines began flights to Denver in 2008 by way of a subsidiary carrier called Lynx Aviation. Lynx used Dash 8 Q400 turboprop aircraft and continued service until 2010.

Continental Express began regional jet flights to the George Bush Intercontinental Airport in Houston in 2011. Continental merged into United Airlines in 2012 and the Houston flights then operated as United Express. Service ended in 2016.

Denver Air Connection, operated by Key Lime Air, began service in the 2012 with flights to the Centennial Airport in south Denver and to the Rocky Mountain Metropolitan Airport on the north side of Denver. The carrier has suspended service during the COVID-19 pandemic but is planned to resume.

After Continental Airlines discontinued their last mainline jet in 1994, GJT was only served with turboprop aircraft for most of the remaining 1990s decade. All carriers upgraded with regional jets in the 2000s and the only mainline jets at Grand Junction are now operated by Allegiant Air which began in 2006. As of 2021 Allegiant was flying Airbus A319/A320s into the airport, however they announced in 2024 that after nearly two decades of continuous service at Grand Junction Regional, they would be suspending passenger service at the beginning of 2025, with no plans to return.

== Accidents and incidents ==
On February 7, 2024, a Hawker 900XP, N900VA, that had departed Grand Junction Regional Airport was destroyed when it impacted terrain near Loma, Colorado. Both pilots were killed.

== See also ==
- List of airports in Colorado
