= Telluride Regional Airport =

Airport in Colorado, USA

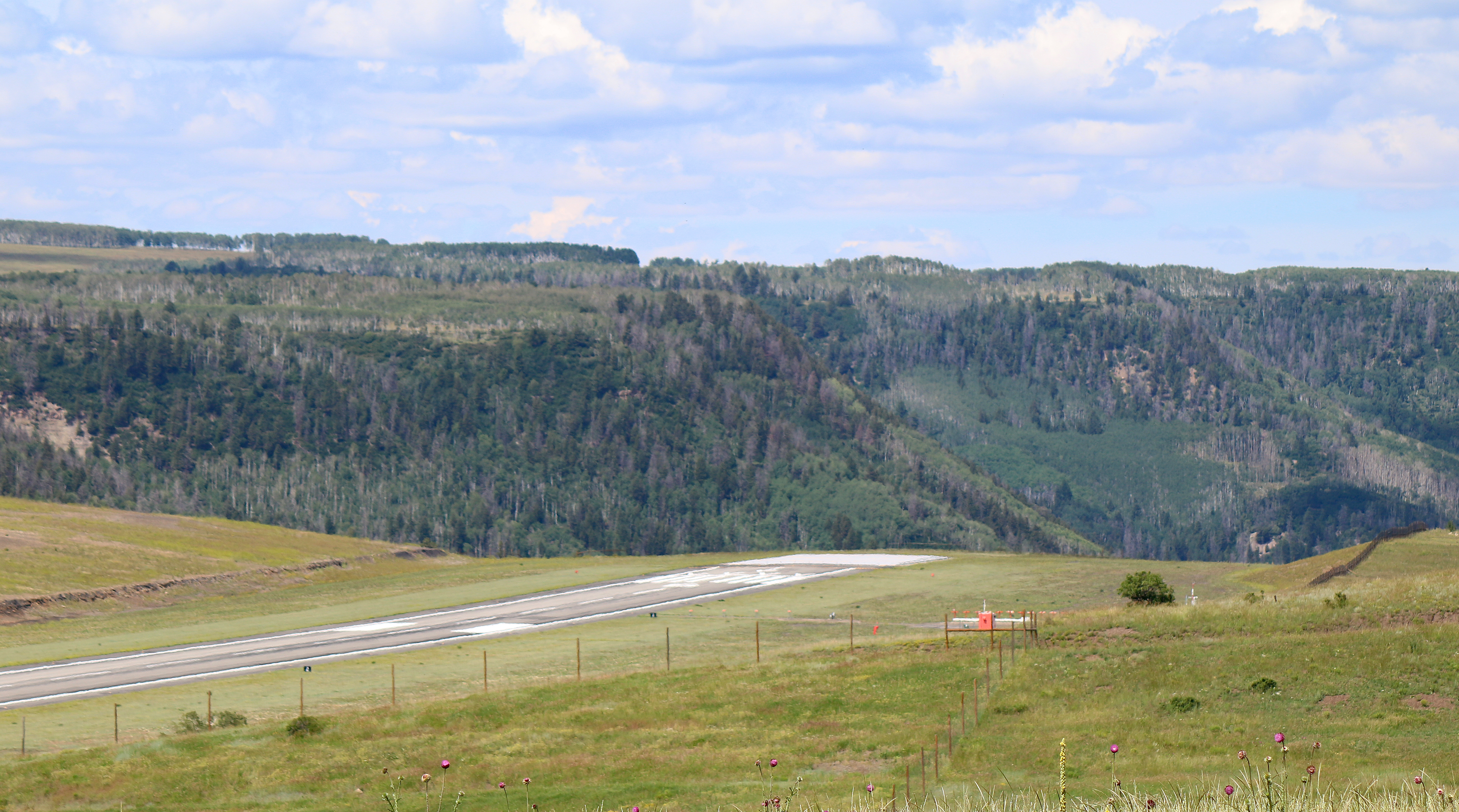
- Runway 9/27 and the dropoff
- IATA: TEX; ICAO: KTEX; FAA LID: TEX

Summary
- Airport type: Public
- Owner: Telluride Regional Airport Authority
- Serves: Telluride, Colorado
- Elevation AMSL: 9,078 ft (2,767 m)
- Coordinates: 37°57′14″N 107°54′31″W
- Website: tellurideairport.com

Map
- Location of airport in Colorado / United States TEX (the United States)

Runways
Direction	Length		Surface
Direction	ft	m	Surface
9/27	7,111	2,167	Asphalt

Statistics (2019)
- Aircraft operations: 9,402
- Based aircraft: 27
- Sources: airport website and FAA

Telluride Regional Airport (IATA: TEX, ICAO: KTEX, FAA LID: TEX) is a public airport in unincorporated San Miguel County, Colorado, United States, 6 miles (9.7 km) west of Telluride. It is owned by the Telluride Regional Airport Authority. At an elevation of 9,078 feet (2767 m) above sea level, it was the highest commercial airport in North America with scheduled passenger flights when Great Lakes Airlines resumed scheduled passenger service in December 2016; however, those flights ceased in March 2018. In August 2018, commercial service returned with the introduction of Boutique Air, and the airport remains the highest airfield in the U.S. with scheduled passenger flights, and the second highest overall airfield in the US behind Leadville Airport. Denver Air Connection is currently the only airline flying scheduled passenger flights from Telluride with daily nonstop flights to Denver and Phoenix. Denver Air operates the Fairchild Dornier 328JET into Telluride. The 328JET is one of the few regional jet airliners in service capable of operating at such high field elevations as TEX.

== Facilities and aircraft ==
Telluride Regional Airport covers 542 acres (219 ha) and has one runway, 9/27, 7,111 by 100 feet (2,167 by 30 m). The runway is on a plateau and still dips slightly in the center, although the dip was more pronounced prior to a renovation in 2009. It can be a challenging but beautiful approach for pilots. In the past during winter months, about 20% of the scheduled commuter airline flights were diverting to other airports because of abruptly adverse landing conditions. This is not unusual since other mountain airports like Sun Valley have similar statistics. When flying to the Telluride Regional Airport, pilots must be aware of unique issues impacting the airfield including high terrain exceeding 14,000 feet (4,300 m), as well as the airport's location on a plateau with a thousand-foot (300 m) drop to the San Miguel River below. Private business jets operate into the Telluride Regional Airport on a regular basis. Other scheduled passenger jet service is available via the Montrose Regional Airport (MTJ), the Durango-La Plata County Airport (DRO) and the Grand Junction Regional Airport (GJT).

In the year ending 2019, the airport had 9,402 aircraft operations, average 26 per day: 99% general aviation and <1% scheduled commercial. 27 aircraft were then based at this airport: 67% single-engine, 11% multi-engine, 14% jet, <1% helicopter and <1% glider.

== Airlines and destinations ==
Airlines	Destinations
Denver Air Connection	Denver, Phoenix–Sky Harbor

=== Historical airline service ===
Mesa Airlines introduced the first commercial airline service to Telluride on December 19, 1985, with flights to Albuquerque and Denver using Beechcraft 1900C turboprops. Flights to Phoenix were added a few months later. Monarch Airlines was serving the airport in 1987 with de Havilland Canada DHC-6 Twin Otter turboprop flights from Aspen, Crested Butte, Grand Junction and Vail with the latter service being flown from the Eagle County Regional Airport. Rocky Mountain Airways operating as Continental Express on behalf of Continental Airlines served Telluride from 1986 through mid-1991 flying 19-passenger Beechcraft 1900C and 50-passenger de Havilland Canada DHC-7 Dash 7 turboprops nonstop to Denver (DEN). Some flights stopped in Aspen (ASE) during the 1986/1987 ski season. The four-engine, STOL capable Dash 7 was the largest aircraft ever to provide scheduled passenger service into Telluride. The Continental Express service to Denver was operated by Britt Airways from mid-1991 through March 8, 1994, then replaced with Continental Connection service operated by GP Express Airlines until January 1995.

StatesWest Airlines flew Beechcraft 1900C turboprops nonstop to Laughlin, NV/Bullhead City, AZ with continuing service to Orange County and Los Angeles on Saturdays only during the 1989/1990 ski season. SkyWest Airlines operating as the Delta Connection flew nonstop Embraer EMB-120 Brasilia service to Los Angeles (LAX) during the 1990/1991, 1991/1992, and 1992/1993 ski seasons. WestAir Commuter Airlines operating as United Express flew an Embraer EMB-120 Brasilia turboprop nonstop to Los Angeles on Saturdays only during the 1992/1993 ski season.

In 1990 the Mesa Airlines flights to Denver began operating as United Express on behalf of United Airlines and in 1992 the Phoenix flights began operating as America West Express on behalf of America West Airlines. Embraer EMB-120 Brasilia and de Havilland Canada DHC-8 Dash 8 aircraft were periodically added to the flight schedules. The Albuquerque flights ended after the 1992/1993 ski season and the Denver flights ended in early 1998 being replaced by Great Lakes Airlines. The Phoenix flights were upgraded to operate with de Havilland Canada DHC-8 Dash 8 turboprops in 1998 and then changed over to operate as US Airways Express in 2007 when America West Airlines and US Airways merged. All service by Mesa Airlines ended on April 4, 2011.

Great Lakes Airlines began service to Telluride in mid 1998 by taking over the United Express contract formerly held by Mesa Airlines. Great Lakes flew Beechcraft 1900Ds nonstop to Denver and changed over to operating under their own identity in early 2002 after the carrier lost its designation as a United Express code sharing air carrier. Service to Telluride continued until September 16, 2014. Great Lakes returned to the airport in December 2016 with flights to Denver and later Phoenix and Los Angeles with one stop en route; however, all service ended once again on March 30, 2018, when Great Lakes ceased all of their operations with turboprop aircraft.

Boutique Air was then recruited to reinstate commercial airline service at Telluride with flights to Denver beginning on August 29, 2018. The carrier uses 9-seat single-engine Pilatus PC-12 turboprop aircraft. Service to Cortez with continuing service to Phoenix was added in mid-2019 but all service ended on October 31, 2019.

Key Lime Air operating as Denver Air Connection began the first scheduled jet service into Telluride on May 15, 2019, with the Fairchild Dornier 328JET on a daily flight to Denver. The service will operate year-round with the exception of two short seasonal breaks in the spring and fall.

== Renovation ==
Between April 7 and November 4, 2009, the Telluride runway was closed for a $24 million runway renovation. The west end of the runway was lowered 30 feet, and the east end 14 ft. The material removed was placed in the center, removing the notorious dip in the middle of the runway. In addition, 41 feet of length was added to the runway and retaining walls were built on the side. In 2010, crews widened the airfield's safety areas from 150 feet to 250 feet, installed an Engineered Materials Arrestor System (EMAS) and finished ancillary aspects of the projects. Work on the EMAS was scheduled at night to prevent disrupting operations. This system is designed in part to allow larger aircraft to utilize the airport.

== Statistics ==
Carrier shares (April 2025 – March 2026)
Carrier	Passengers (arriving and departing)
Denver Air Connection	18,860(100.00%)

Top domestic destinations (April 2025 – March 2026)
Rank	Airport	Passengers	Carrier
1	Denver, Colorado	6,030	Denver Air Connection
2	Phoenix, Arizona	3,360	Denver Air Connection

== Media appearances ==
Telluride Regional Airport is the destination in the "Telluride Landing" mission supplied with Microsoft Flight Simulator X. The player must land a Bombardier Learjet 45 with passengers on board.

Part of an episode of The Grand Tour was filmed at the airport, in which the presenters tried to get some Jaguar Cars up to 100 mph (160 km/h) and then stop before going over the cliff at the end of the runway.

== See also ==
- List of airports in Colorado
