= Denver Air Connection =

Airline of the United States

IATA	ICAO	Call sign
KG	LYM	KEY LIME
- Founded: 1997; 29 years ago
- AOC #: KY7A882H
- Hubs: Denver International Airport
- Focus cities: Denver, CO
- Destinations: 18
- Parent company: Key Lime Air
- Key people: Cliff Honeycutt (Founder, President and CEO); Glen Rich (Founder, Vice President and COO); Dan Bauer (Founder)
- Website: denverairconnection.com

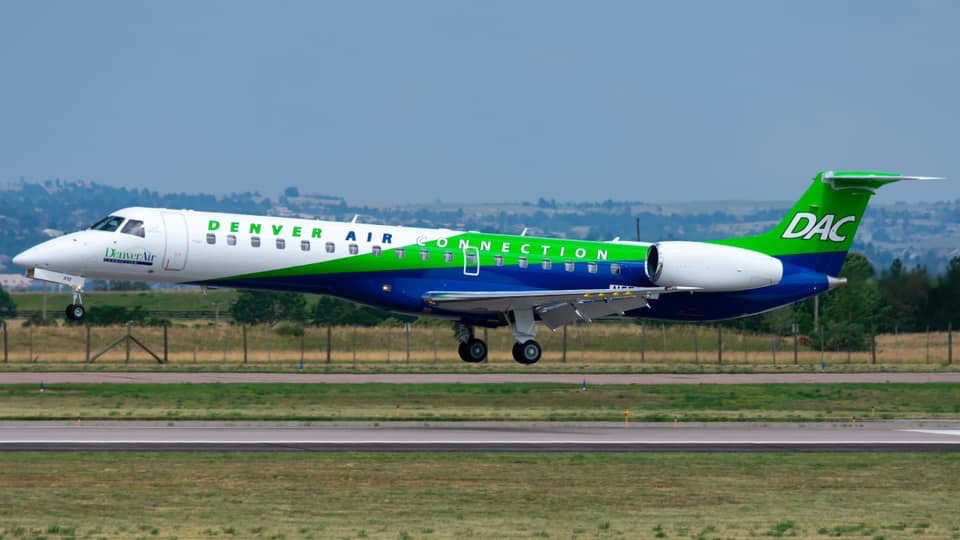
Denver Air Connection Embraer ERJ 145

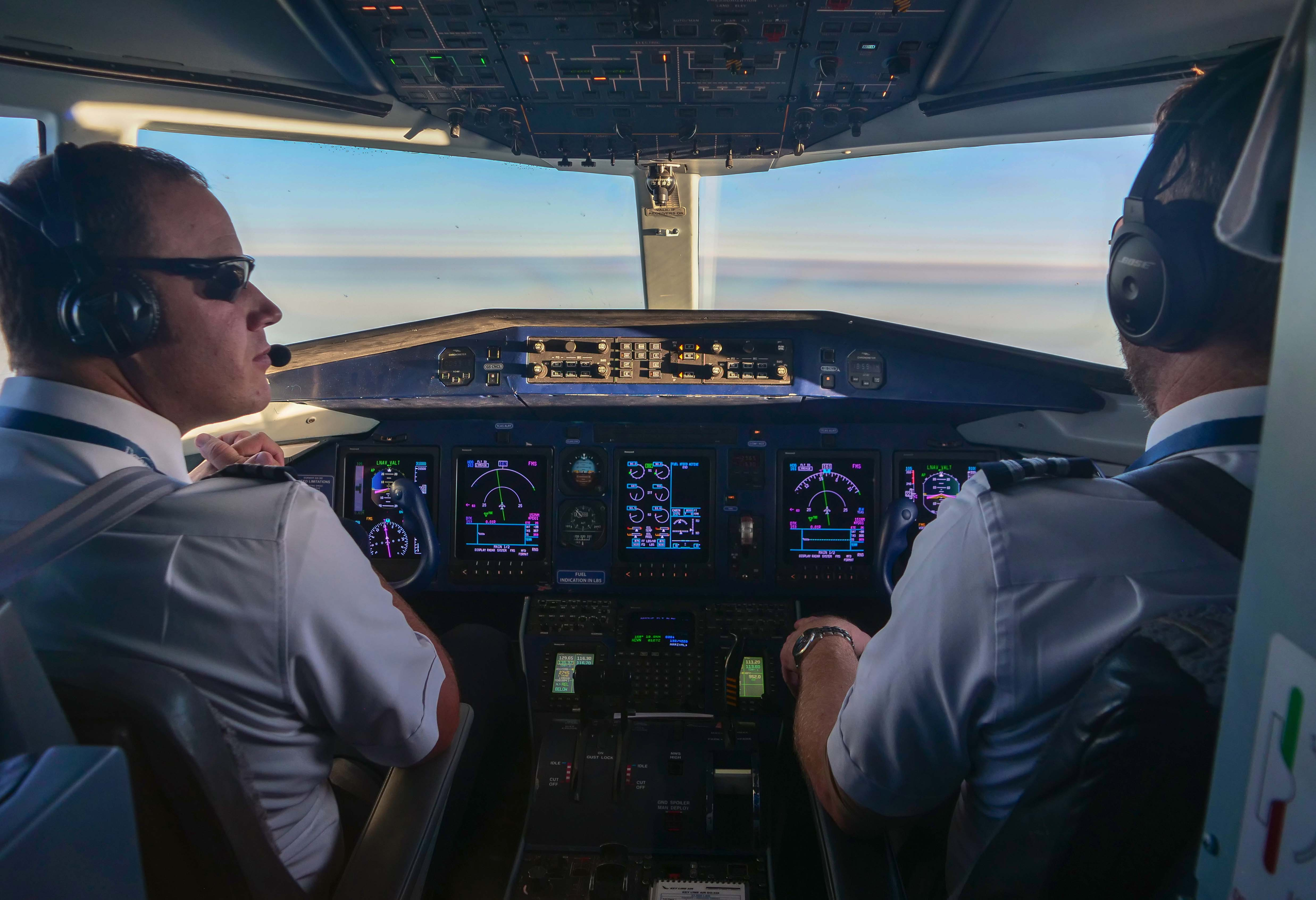
Cockpit view of a DAC Dornier 328JET inflight

Denver Air Connection is a subsidiary of Key Lime Air providing both charter and scheduled passenger air service.

== History ==
Key Lime Air, dba Denver Air Connection (DAC), operates FAR Part 121 regional airline scheduled passenger service and scheduled passenger air charter. DAC operates scheduled routes between 16 cities across 10 states. Flights are operated with various aircraft, including Embraer ERJ-145 and Fairchild Dornier 328JET regional jets as well as Fairchild Swearingen Metroliner and Embraer EMB-120 Brasilia turboprops under FAR Part 135.

Denver Air Connection has an interline relationship with United Airlines, American Airlines, and Delta Air Lines enabling travelers to fly DAC and connect to these partners without having to collect and recheck baggage.

On 15 May 2019, the airline began service to Telluride Regional Airport also operating as Denver Air Connection and using the Fairchild Dornier 328JET. The service is the first jet service at the Telluride airport.

On June 1, 2019, the airline began its first Essential Air Service (EAS) contract at Alliance Municipal Airport under the Denver Air Connection brand, using the Fairchild Swearingen Metroliner. The service offers 12 weekly round trips to Denver.

== Scheduled destinations ==
Denver Air Connection serves the following destinations:

City	Airport	IATA Code	Destinations	Notes
Colorado
Alamosa	San Luis Valley Regional Airport	ALS	Denver	Contract awarded from SkyWest due to contract termination
Cortez	Cortez Municipal Airport	CEZ	Denver Phoenix	Contract awarded from Boutique Air
Denver	Denver International Airport	DEN	Alamosa Alliance Chadron Cortez Clovis McCook Pueblo Telluride	Hub
Pueblo	Pueblo Memorial Airport	PUB	Denver	EAS Community | Awarded from Southern Airways Express
Telluride	Telluride Regional Airport	TEX	Denver Phoenix	
Florida
Orlando	Orlando Sanford International Airport	SFB	Muskegon	Begins January 7, 2027
(Georgia (U.S. state)) Georgia
Atlanta	Hartsfield–Jackson Atlanta International Airport	ATL	Jackson (TN)	
Illinois
Chicago	O'Hare International Airport	ORD	Ironwood Jackson (TN) Muskegon	
Nebraska
Alliance	Alliance Municipal Airport	AIA	Denver	EAS Community
Chadron	Chadron Municipal Airport	CDR	Denver	EAS Community
McCook	McCook Ben Nelson Regional Airport	MCK	Denver	EAS Community
New Mexico
Clovis	Clovis Municipal Airport	CVN	Dallas-Ft. Worth Denver	EAS Community
Michigan
Ironwood	Gogebic–Iron County Airport	IWD	Chicago O'Hare Minneapolis	EAS Community
Muskegon	Muskegon County Airport	MKG	Chicago O'Hare	EAS Community
Muskegon	Muskegon County Airport	MKG	Orlando/Sanford	Begins January 7, 2027
Minnesota
Minneapolis/St Paul	Minneapolis–Saint Paul International Airport	MSP	Ironwood Thief River Falls	
Thief River Falls	Thief River Falls Regional Airport	TVF	Minneapolis	EAS Community
Tennessee
Jackson	Jackson Regional Airport	MKL	Atlanta Chicago O'Hare	EAS Community
Texas
Dallas/Fort Worth	Dallas/Fort Worth International Airport	DFW	Clovis	

=== Former destinations ===
City	Airport	IATA Code	Destinations	Notes
Colorado
Centennial	Centennial Airport	APA	Grand Junction	
Grand Junction	Grand Junction Regional Airport	GJT	Denver-Centennial	
Iowa
Dubuque	Dubuque Regional Airport	DBQ	Chicago O'Hare	
Nebraska
Kearney	Kearney Regional Airport	EAR	Denver	EAS Community | SkyWest chosen as new air carrier
South Dakota
Pierre	Pierre Regional Airport	PIR	Denver	EAS Community
Watertown	Watertown Regional Airport	ATY	Chicago O'Hare Denver	EAS Community
Wyoming
Riverton	Central Wyoming Regional Airport	RIW	Denver	
Sheridan	Sheridan Airport	SHR	Denver	

=== Interline Agreements ===
- Delta Air Lines
- United Airlines
- American Airlines

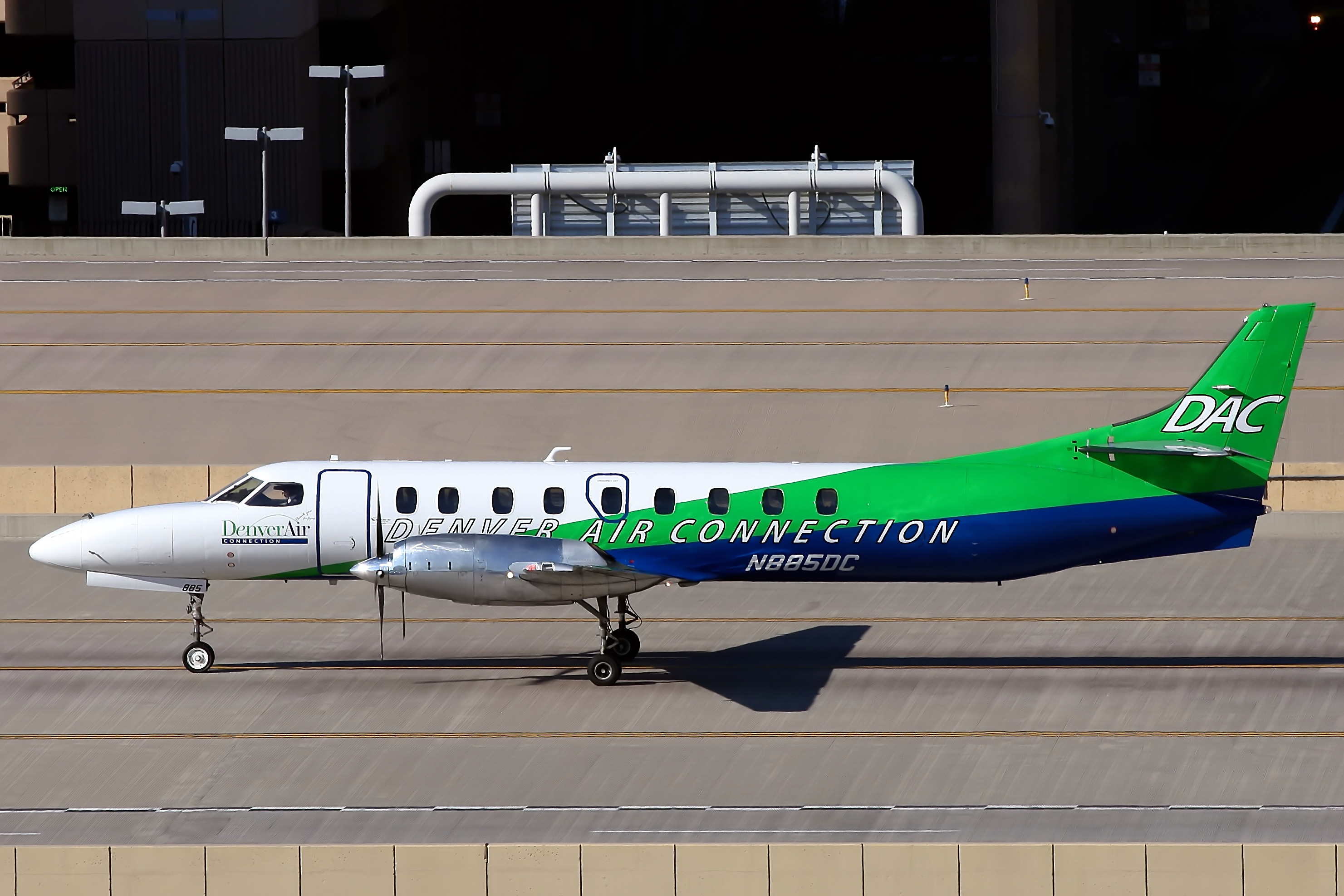
DAC Fairchild Swearingen Metroliner

== Accidents and incidents ==
- On April 14, 2022, a Fairchild Metroliner (registration N820DC) operating flight 4230 experienced a nose gear malfunction and collapse at slow speed following an aborted takeoff at Denver International Airport. There were no injuries reported.
