= San Luis Valley Regional Airport =

Airport in Colorado, United States of America

San Luis Valley Regional Airport Bergman Field
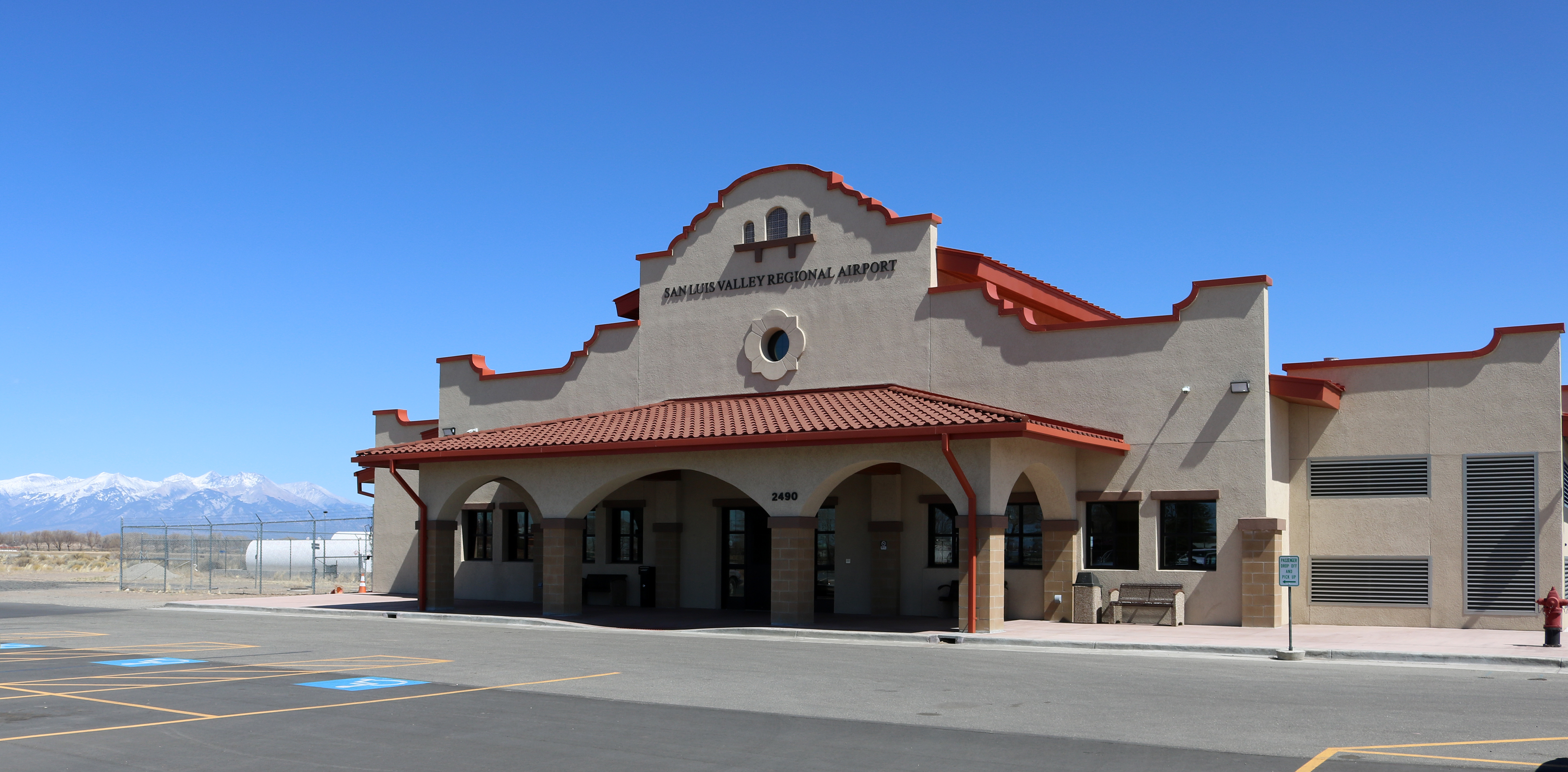
- Terminal building
- IATA: ALS; ICAO: KALS; FAA LID: ALS; WMO: 72462

Summary
- Airport type: Public
- Owner: City and County of Alamosa
- Serves: San Luis Valley, Southern Colorado, Northern New Mexico
- Location: 2490 State Avenue, Alamosa, Colorado 81101
- Elevation AMSL: 7,539 ft (2,298 m)
- Coordinates: 37°26′06″N 105°51′59″W
- Website: San Luis Valley Regional Airport

Map
- Location within Colorado Location within the United States

Runways
Direction	Length		Surface
Direction	ft	m	Surface
2/20	8,521	2,597	Asphalt

Statistics
- Aircraft operations (year ending 1/31/2018): 8,403
- Based aircraft: 26
- Source: Federal Aviation Administration

San Luis Valley Regional Airport (IATA: ALS, ICAO: KALS, FAA LID: ALS) (Bergman Field) is two miles south of Alamosa, in Alamosa County, Colorado, United States. It sees one airline, subsidized by the Essential Air Service program. The airport reached 10,000 enplanements for the first time in its EAS participation with Boutique Air and is now classified as a non-hub primary airport.

== History ==
The airport was conceived in 1939 and construction began later that year. It was opened in early 1941. It is now owned by the City and County of Alamosa and is named for Carl A. Bergman (1908–1988), a local businessman and initial supporter of the airport. The first airline flights were Monarch DC-3s in 1946–47; Monarch's successor Frontier started service in 1982 with Convair 580's.

== Facilities ==
The airport covers 1,700 acres (688 ha) at an elevation of 7,539 feet (2,298 m). It has one runway: 2/20 is 8,521 by 100 feet (2,597 x 30 m) asphalt .

In the year ending January 31, 2018 the airport had 8,403 aircraft operations, average 23 per day: 52% general aviation, 30% air taxi, and 18% military. 26 aircraft were then based at the airport: 20 single-engine and 6 multi-engine. The airport is an uncontrolled airport that has no control tower.

== Airline and destinations ==
Denver Air Connection connects San Luis Valley Airport to Dallas Fort Worth International Airport and Denver International Airport.

== Statistics ==
=== Top destinations ===
Busiest domestic routes out of ALS (April 2022 - March 2023)
Rank	City	Passengers
1	Denver, CO	9,000

Passenger boardings (enplanements) by year, as per the FAA
Year	2009	2010	2011	2012	2013	2014	2015	2016	2017	2018	2019	2023
Enplanements	6,279	6,737	7,104	6,959	6,983	3,920	3,105	3,863	6,494	7,125	10,044	11,319
Change	▼12.32%	▲7.29%	▲5.45%	▼2.04%	▲0.34%	▼43.86%	▼20.79%	▲24.41%	▲68.11%	▲9.72%	▲40.97%	▲12.66%
Airline	Great Lakes Airlines	Great Lakes Airlines	Great Lakes Airlines	Great Lakes Airlines	Great Lakes Airlines	Great Lakes Airlines	Great Lakes Airlines	Great Lakes Airlines	Boutique Air	Boutique Air	Boutique Air	Denver Air Connection
Destination(s)	Denver	Denver	Denver	Denver	Denver	Denver; Farmington	Denver; Farmington	Denver	Albuquerque; Denver	Denver	Denver	Denver

== See also ==
- List of airports in Colorado

== Other sources ==
- Essential Air Service documents (Docket OST-1997-2960) from the U.S. Department of Transportation:
  - Order 2006-7-19: selecting Great Lakes Aviation, Ltd. to provide subsidized essential air service (EAS) at Alamosa and Cortez, Colorado for two years, beginning August 1, 2006. Alamosa will receive three nonstop round trips to Denver each weekday and weekend (18 total round trips per week) at an annual subsidy rate of $1,150,268. Cortez will receive three nonstop round trips to Denver each weekday and weekend at an annual subsidy rate of $796,577. Each community will be served with 19-passenger Beech 1900-D aircraft.
  - Order 2008-5-34: reselecting Great Lakes Aviation, Ltd., d/b/a United Express, to provide essential air service (EAS) at annual subsidy rates of $1,853,475 at Alamosa, Colorado, and $1,295,562 at Cortez, through July 31, 2010.
  - Order 2010-7-5: selecting Great Lakes Aviation, Ltd., to continue providing subsidized essential air service (EAS) at Alamosa and Cortez, Colorado, for the two-year period beginning August 1, 2010, at the annual subsidy rates of $1,987,155 and $1,847,657, respectively.
