= Denver International Airport =

Airport in Denver, Colorado, United States

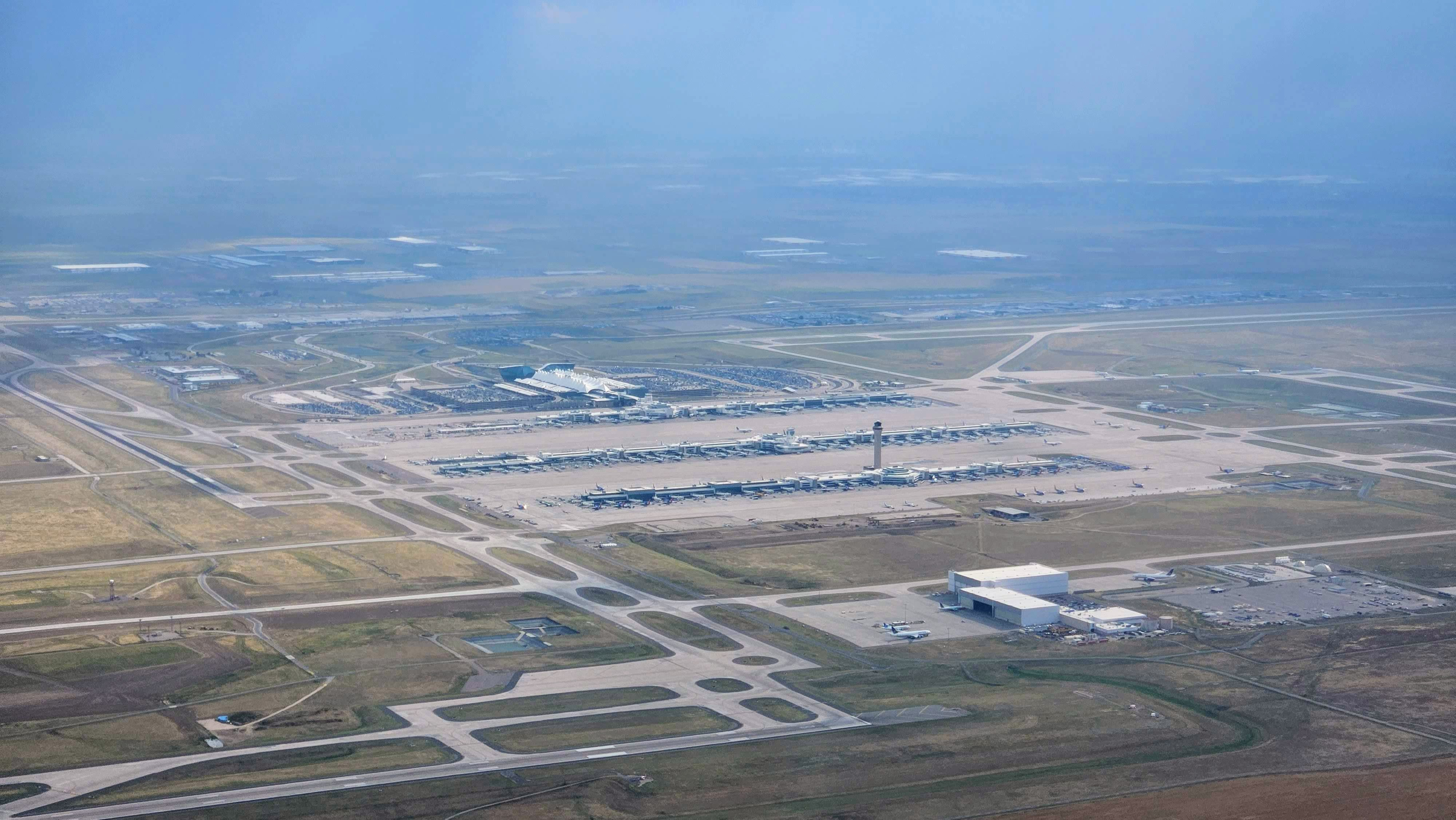
- Aerial view in 2023
- IATA: DEN; ICAO: KDEN; FAA LID: DEN; WMO: 72565

Summary
- Airport type: Public
- Owner: City & County of Denver
- Operator: City & County of Denver Department of Aviation
- Serves: Denver metropolitan area; Front Range Urban Corridor
- Location: Northeast Denver, Colorado, U.S.
- Opened: February 28, 1995; 31 years ago
- Hub for: United Airlines
- Operating base for: Frontier Airlines; Southwest Airlines
- Time zone: MST (UTC−07:00)
  - Summer (DST): MDT (UTC−06:00)
- Elevation AMSL: 5,434 ft (1,656 m)
- Coordinates: 39°51′42″N 104°40′23″W
- Public transit access: at Denver Airport
- Website: flydenver.com

Maps
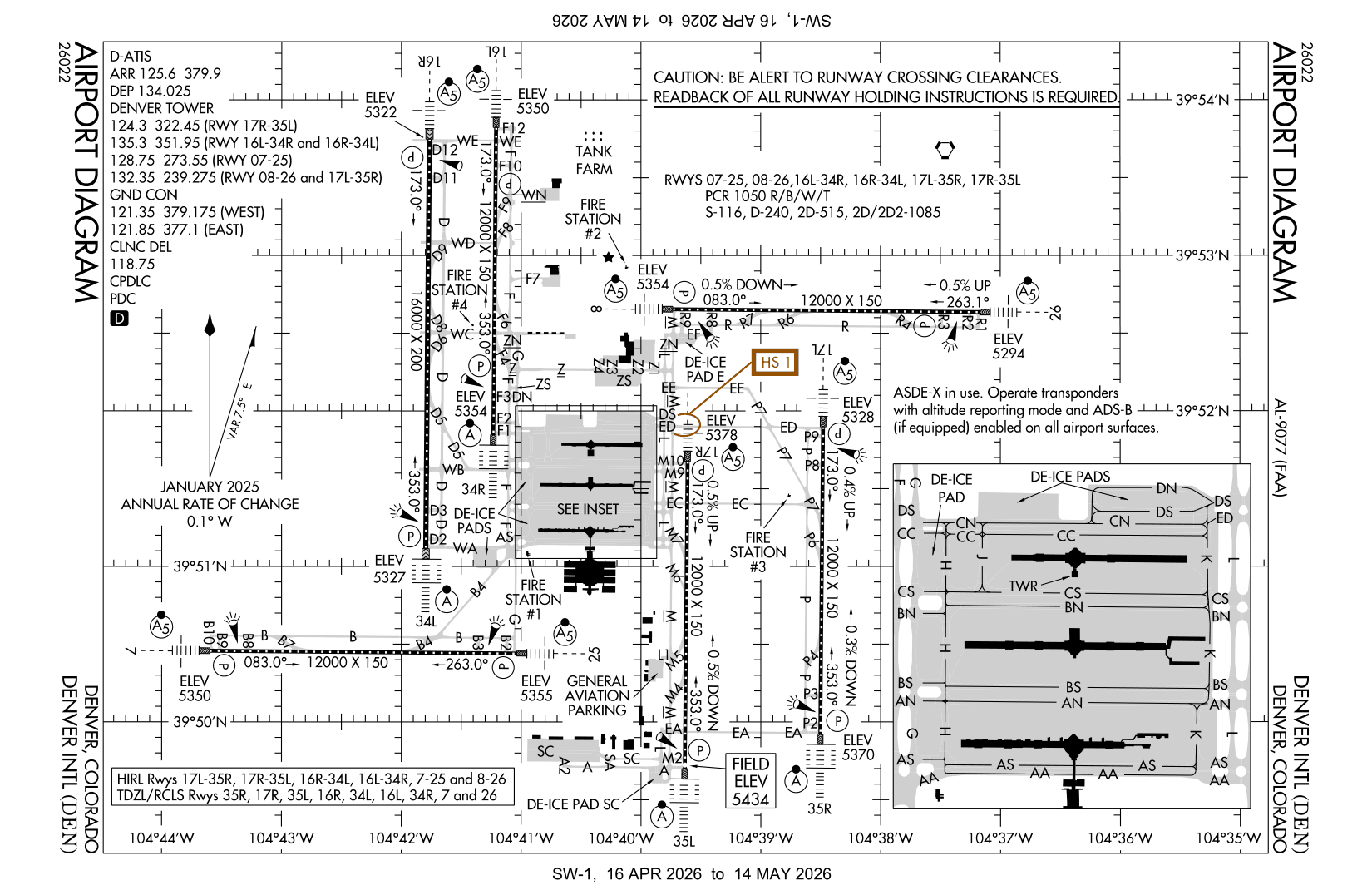
- FAA airport diagram
- Interactive map of Denver International Airport

Runways
Direction	Length		Surface
Direction	ft	m	Surface
7/25	12,000	3,658	Concrete
8/26	12,000	3,658	Concrete
16L/34R	12,000	3,658	Concrete
16R/34L	16,000	4,877	Concrete
17L/35R	12,000	3,658	Concrete
17R/35L	12,000	3,658	Concrete

Statistics (2025)
- Passengers: 82,427,962 ▲0.1%
- Aircraft operations: 705,469
- Total cargo (lbs.): 732,559,659
- Economic contribution (2018): $33.5 billion
- Source: Denver International Airport

Denver International Airport (IATA: DEN, ICAO: KDEN, FAA LID: DEN), often referred to by locals as DIA, is an international airport in the Western United States, primarily serving metropolitan Denver, Colorado, as well as the greater Front Range Urban Corridor.

Runway 16R/34L, with a length of 16000 ft (4877 m), is the longest public use runway in North America and the fifth longest in the world. The airport is 25 miles (40 km) driving distance northeast of Downtown Denver, 19 miles (31 km) farther than the former Stapleton International Airport which DEN replaced; the airport is actually closer to the city of Aurora than central Denver, and many airport-related services, such as hotels, are located in Aurora.

Opened on February 28, 1995, DEN serves 26 airlines (as of 2025) providing nonstop service to 230 destinations throughout the Americas, Europe, and Asia; it was the fourth airport in the United States to exceed 200 destinations. The airport has been the largest operating hub for Frontier Airlines and Southwest Airlines for several years and, as of 2024, DEN has eclipsed Chicago's O'Hare International Airport as the largest operating hub for United Airlines as well. The Colorado Department of Transportation's 2025 Economic Impact Study estimated that the airport contributes $47.2 billion annually to Colorado's economy and, with over 40,000 employees, the airport is the largest employer in the state of Colorado. The airport is located on the western edge of the Great Plains and within sight of the Front Range of the Rocky Mountains.

In 2021 and 2022, DEN was the third busiest airport in the world as well as the third busiest airport in the United States by passenger traffic. In 2023, it was the sixth busiest airport in the world and remained the third busiest in the United States, having served around 77.8 million passengers, more than a 12% increase from the prior year. DEN has been among the top 20 busiest airports in the world and top 10 busiest airports in the United States every year since 2000.

In 2025, DEN set an all-time passenger record with 82,427,962 passengers served, up 0.1% over the previous record set in 2024.

== History ==
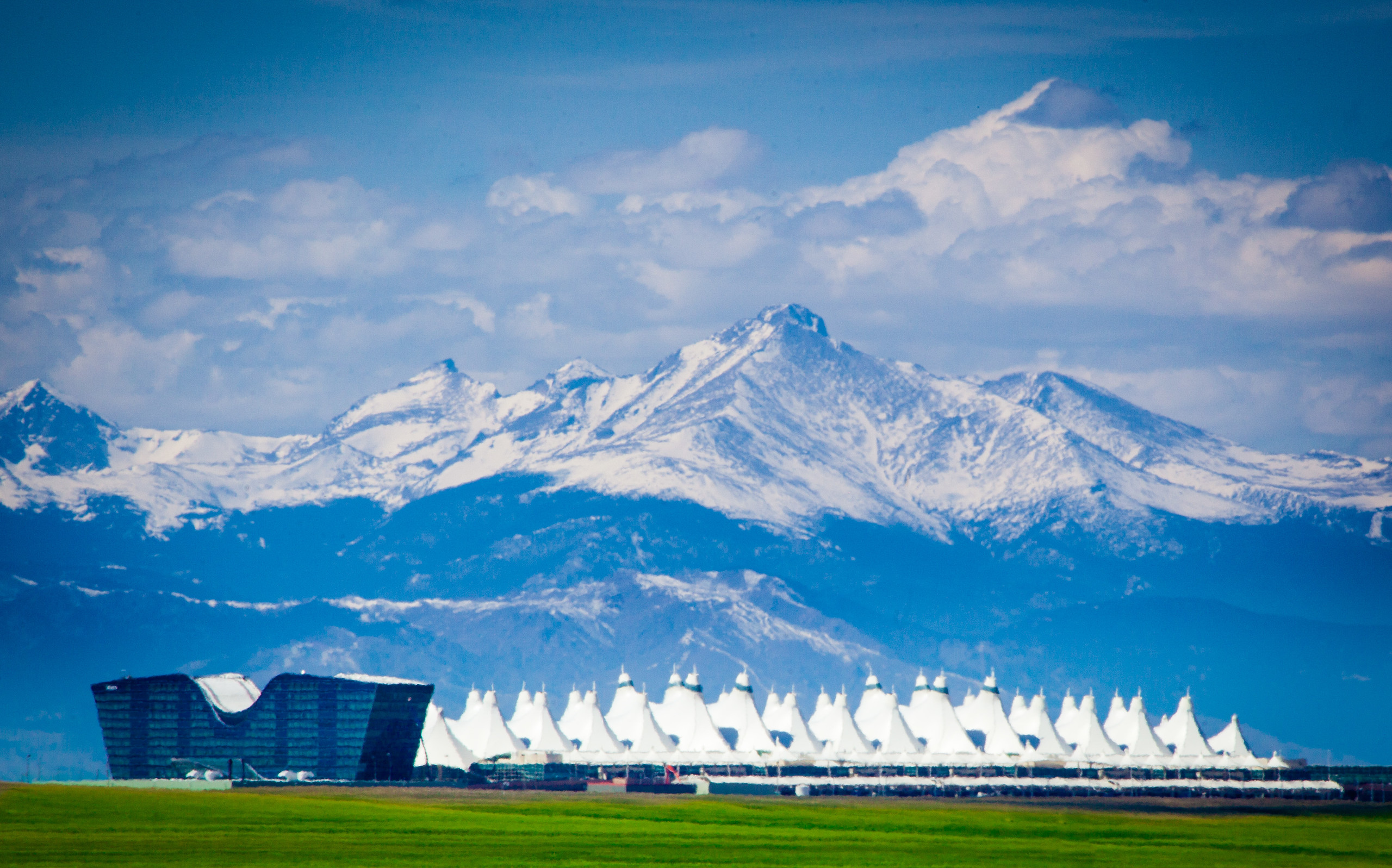
View of Denver Airport (back) and Westin Hotel (front) in April 2016.

Aerial view in 2002 when runway 16R/34L was under construction

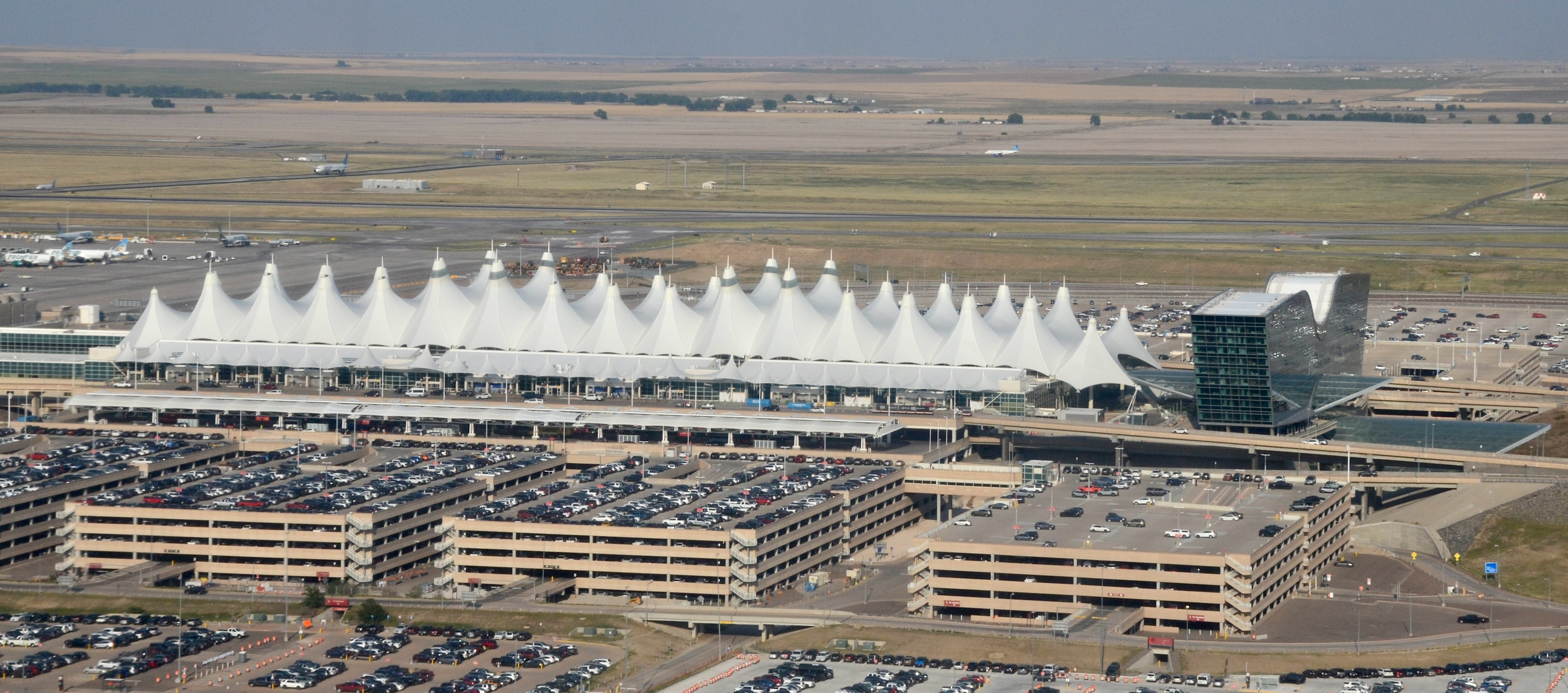
Aerial view of Jeppesen Terminal in 2025

Denver has traditionally been home to one of the busier airports in the United States because its midcontinent location was ideal for an airline hub. Several airlines, notably United Airlines and Continental Airlines, had hubs at the former Stapleton International Airport, helping make it the sixth-busiest airport in the country by the 1960s. However, Stapleton had little room to add more flights and its runways were too close together, which led to long delays and nationwide travel disruptions in bad weather.

From 1980 to 1983, the Denver Regional Council of Governments investigated areas for a new area airport north and east of Denver. Meanwhile, in 1983, Federico Peña was elected mayor of Denver, campaigning on a plan to expand Stapleton onto Rocky Mountain Arsenal lands. The plan had broad support, but leaders in nearby Adams County threatened to sue over noise concerns.

Eventually Peña struck a deal: Adams County leaders would rally citizens to back a plan for Denver to annex 54 square miles (140 km^{2}) of the county to build an airport away from established neighborhoods. In 1988, Adams County voters approved the annexation. The proposal was met with some skepticism because of its location: 24 miles (39 km) from the heart of the city. But seeing the importance of a Denver air hub to the national transportation system, the federal government put $500 million (equivalent to $1.1 billion as of 2025) toward the new airport. The rest of the cost would be financed by bonds, to be repaid with fees on airlines. Ground was broken in September 1989.

Two years later, Mayor Wellington Webb inherited the megaproject, which at that time was scheduled to open on October 29, 1993. At the time United was refusing to move to the new airport over the high proposed fees. The airline finally relented under the condition that the airport include an automated baggage system.

Construction delays pushed opening day back, first to December 1993, then to March 1994. By September 1993, delays due to a millwright strike and other events meant opening day was pushed back again to May 1994.

In April 1994, the city invited reporters to observe the first test of the new automated baggage system. Reporters were treated to scenes of clothing and other personal effects scattered beneath the system's tracks and carts that would often toss the luggage right off the system. After the embarrassing preview, the mayor cancelled the planned May opening. The baggage system continued to be a maintenance hassle and was finally terminated in September 2005, with traditional baggage handlers manually handling cargo and passenger luggage.

DEN finally replaced Stapleton on February 28, 1995, 16 months behind schedule and at a cost of $4.8 billion (equivalent to $9.3 billion as of 2025), nearly $2 billion over budget ($3.9 billion as of 2025). The construction employed 11,000 workers. United Airlines Flight 1062 to Kansas City International Airport was the first to depart DEN and United Flight 1474 from Colorado Springs Airport was the first to arrive at the new airport.

In September 2003, runway 16R/34L was added, the airport's sixth and at 16,000 ft (3.0 mi; 4.9 km), it is 4,000 ft (0.76 mi; 1.2 km) longer than the other runways. Its length, exceeded by only six other runways in the world, allows fully laden Airbus A380s and Boeing 747-8s to take off in the hot and high conditions at the airport, which is roughly 1 mi (1.6 km) above sea level.

During a blizzard on March 17–19, 2003, the weight of heavy snow tore a hole in the terminal's white fabric roof, and over 2 feet (0.61 m) of snow on paved areas closed the airport and its main access road (Peña Boulevard) for almost two days, stranding several thousand people. Another blizzard on December 20–21, 2006, dumped over 20 inches (51 cm) of snow in about 24 hours. The airport was closed for more than 45 hours, stranding thousands. Following this, the airport invested heavily in new snow-removal equipment that has led to a dramatic reduction in runway occupancy times to clear snow, down from an average of 45 minutes in 2006 to just 15 minutes. In 2020, the airport was awarded the Balchen/Post award, which is presented by the Northeast Chapter of the American Association of Airport Executives (AAAE) for the outstanding snow and ice removal operation during difficult winter conditions.

After shunning DEN for over a decade for its high fees, Southwest Airlines entered the airport in January 2006 with 13 daily flights. Southwest has since rapidly expanded and is now the airport's second-largest carrier after United.

On November 19, 2015, a Westin Hotel was added to the airport and on April 22, 2016, DEN received commuter rail service to Denver Union Station with the opening of RTD's A Line.

On September 9, 2015, a political campaign was launched by Mayor Michael Hancock to radically expand commercial development at DEN, previously prohibited by intergovernmental agreement between Denver and Adams County. The changes to the agreement were approved by both Denver and Adams County voters in November 2015.

In 2018, work began on a major interior renovation and reconfiguration to the entire Jeppesen Terminal including the beginning phases of construction to relocate all TSA security checkpoints from the A-Bridge and Great Hall on Level 5 (North and South) to Level 6 (East & West) while simultaneously updating and consolidating airline ticket counters/check-in for all airlines. Eventually, both pre- and post-security gathering and leisure areas will be incorporated into the spaces where both expansive TSA security areas on Level 5 were previously located. The renovation and reconfiguration will bring back the original intent and use of the Great Hall as a large commons area for airport patrons and visitors to enjoy. In early February 2024, the first of two new security screening areas (West Security on Level 6) opened to the public and North Security closed permanently. In early August 2025, the new East Security, directly across the Great Hall from West, opened ahead of schedule and South Security closed permanently, officially moving all security to Level 6. Simultaneously, the A-Bridge, previously the location of a small security checkpoint, reopened, now serving as a post-security alternative to the train for passengers departing from A gates. As of 2017, the phased terminal project was expected to be completed by 2028; however, a 2025 press release shared that the project has been moving ahead of schedule and is now projected to be complete in 2027.

Additionally in 2018, work commenced on a major gate expansion to all three concourses with 12 new gates being added to A (including several single and double-jetway gates with direct access to U.S. Customs and Border Protection), 11 to B, and 16 to C, for a total of 39 new gates. Following the completion of the project in 2020, United Airlines made plans to lease 24 additional gates on both A and B (which would bring its total gate count at DEN to around 90), as well as build a new United Club in Concourse A and expand their existing clubs in B. Southwest Airlines leased 16 of the new gates in C bringing its total gate count at DEN to 40, which is SWA's largest gate count at any single airport. By November 2022, all new gates in A-West, B-West, B-East and C-East were in use. New retail and restaurant tenants continued to open through 2024, as well as new art that will be commissioned and installed through 2025. Additionally, all existing way-finding signs, flight information display systems and gate signs were replaced after 2017 matching what is found at the new gates and within the renovated portions of the terminal. When both the ongoing terminal and concourse projects are completed, the airport will be able to handle upwards of 100 million passengers per year.

On August 20, 2021, the airport experienced a mechanical failure of its train system that caused significant delays. In response, a request for information from the private sector was issued to analyze options to possibly supplement the train system in the future. By 2023, several companies proposed their ideas to transport passengers.

In 2022, a committee was formed to support efforts to establish flights between Denver and Africa. A public survey was conducted but results were not released and, to date, no direct flights to Africa have been established.

In August 2022, DEN broke ground on an additional gate expansion project that would bring a total of 14 ground-loaded/tarmac gates to the east end of Concourse A to be used solely for Frontier Airlines operations. Originally constructed in 2018 as temporary regional gates for United Airlines, this A-East wing was vacated by United earlier in 2022, making way for the renovation and expansion of the Frontier gates. It is intended to be removed once a more permanent A-East expansion (similar to what recently opened in A-West) occurs at an unknown future date. The renovated and expanded Concourse A-East wing officially opened summer 2024 and resulted in a gain of four gates for Frontier Airlines.

In December 2023 DEN started construction on a new 'Center of Equity and Excellence in Aviation' which will help under-served communities and prepare current and future employees for a career in aviation. The CEEA will be located directly below the Westin Hotel and DEN Plaza. Construction reached substantial completion in 2025, with the broader Great Hall Program expected to be completed by the end of 2027.

In late 2023, the airport laid out preliminary plans to add four new concourses with 100 more gates east and west of the terminal by 2045. The project is being referred to as 'Operation 2045' and will help support the airport's goal of serving over 125 million passengers annually by that time.

On April 30, 2025, DEN welcomed the Airbus A380 for the first time for regular commercial service operated by Lufthansa. The aircraft arrived from Munich International Airport (MUC) at 1:45 pm local time and departed back to Munich at 4:15 pm. Lufthansa ran daily A380 flights from DEN to Munich until September 30.

In May 2026, DEN announced preliminary plans to build pedestrian tunnels to transport passengers between the terminal and concourses to provide an alternative to taking the trains. This is because the trains are at capacity and when outages occur, it severely affects passengers, leaving many stranded at a station, missing their flight. No official plans have been released, but the price is expected to be around $300 million to $700 million. Construction is expected to start in 2027 and last through 2028 or 2029.

== Facilities ==
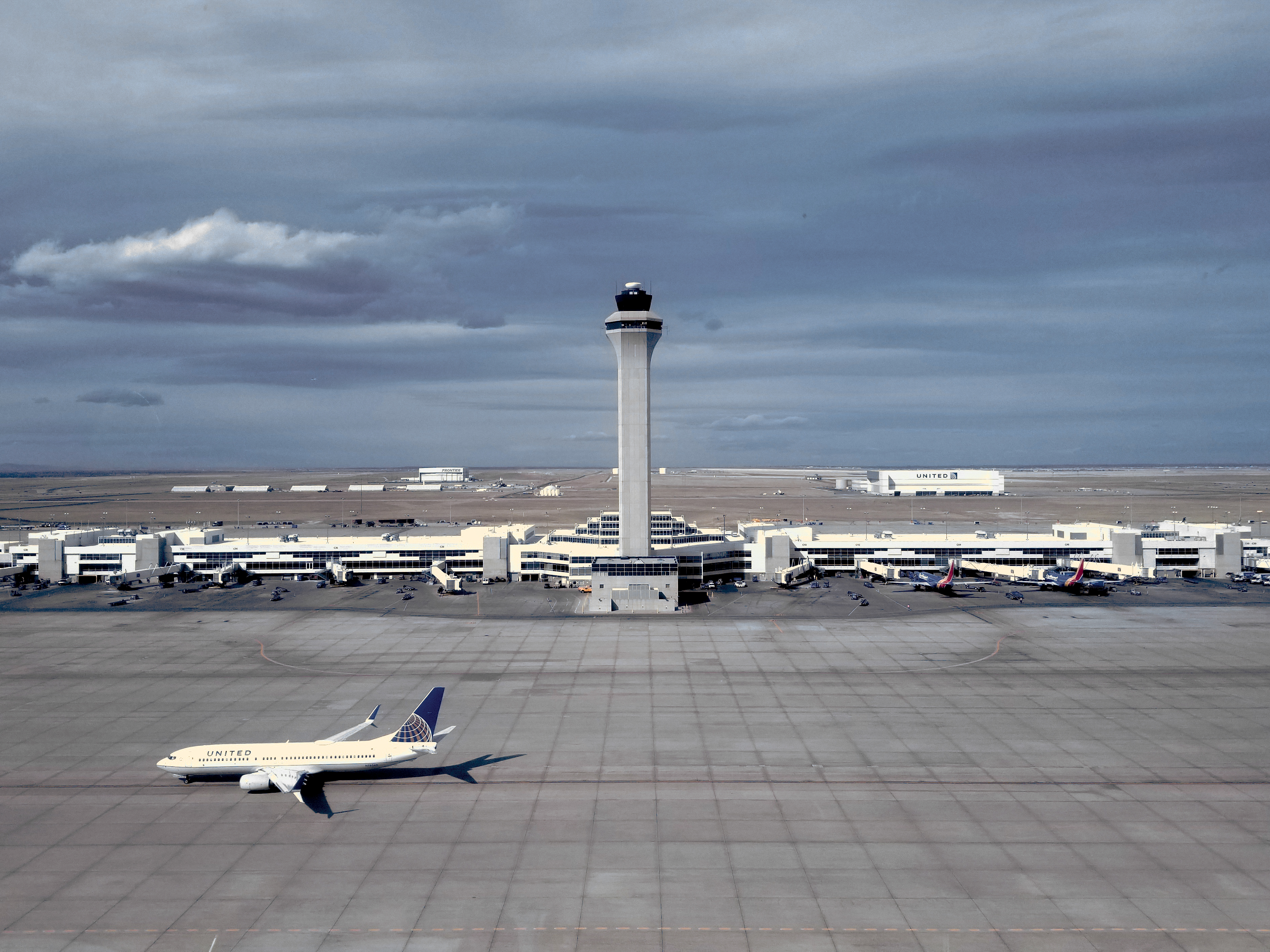
The Air Traffic Control Tower and Concourse C at Denver International Airport with a United Airlines Boeing 737-800 taxiing below in March 2018.

The airport is 23 miles (37 km) from Downtown Denver, which is 15 miles (24 km) farther away than Stapleton International Airport, the airport DEN replaced.

The 33,531 acres (52.4 sq mi; 135.7 km^{2}) of land owned by DEN is the largest amount of commercial airport land area in North America, by a great extent. DEN is so large that in terms of airports, Dallas Fort Worth International Airport, Chicago O'Hare International Airport, Hartsfield-Jackson Atlanta International Airport, and Los Angeles International Airport can fit into the airport's expansive property with almost 500 acres (200 ha) of land to spare. The land, transferred from Adams County to Denver after a 1989 vote, increased the city's size by 50 percent and bifurcated the western portion of the neighboring county. All freeway traffic accessing the airport from central Denver leaves the city and passes through Aurora for nearly two miles (3.2 km), making the airport a practical exclave. Similarly, the A Line rail service connecting the airport with downtown Denver has two intervening stations in Aurora.

=== Terminal ===
DEN has one terminal, named the Jeppesen Terminal after aviation safety pioneer Elrey Borge Jeppesen, and three midfield concourses, spaced far apart. The three midfield concourses have a total of 169 gates in operation as of early 2025. Concourse A is accessible via a pedestrian bridge directly from the terminal building, as well as via the underground train system that services all three concourses. For access to Concourses B and C, passengers must utilize the train. All international arrivals without border pre-clearance are processed in Concourse A; this concourse also has four 3-jetway international gates that can support ADG Group VI aircraft such as an Airbus A380 and a Boeing 747-8, the two largest commercial aircraft in the world.

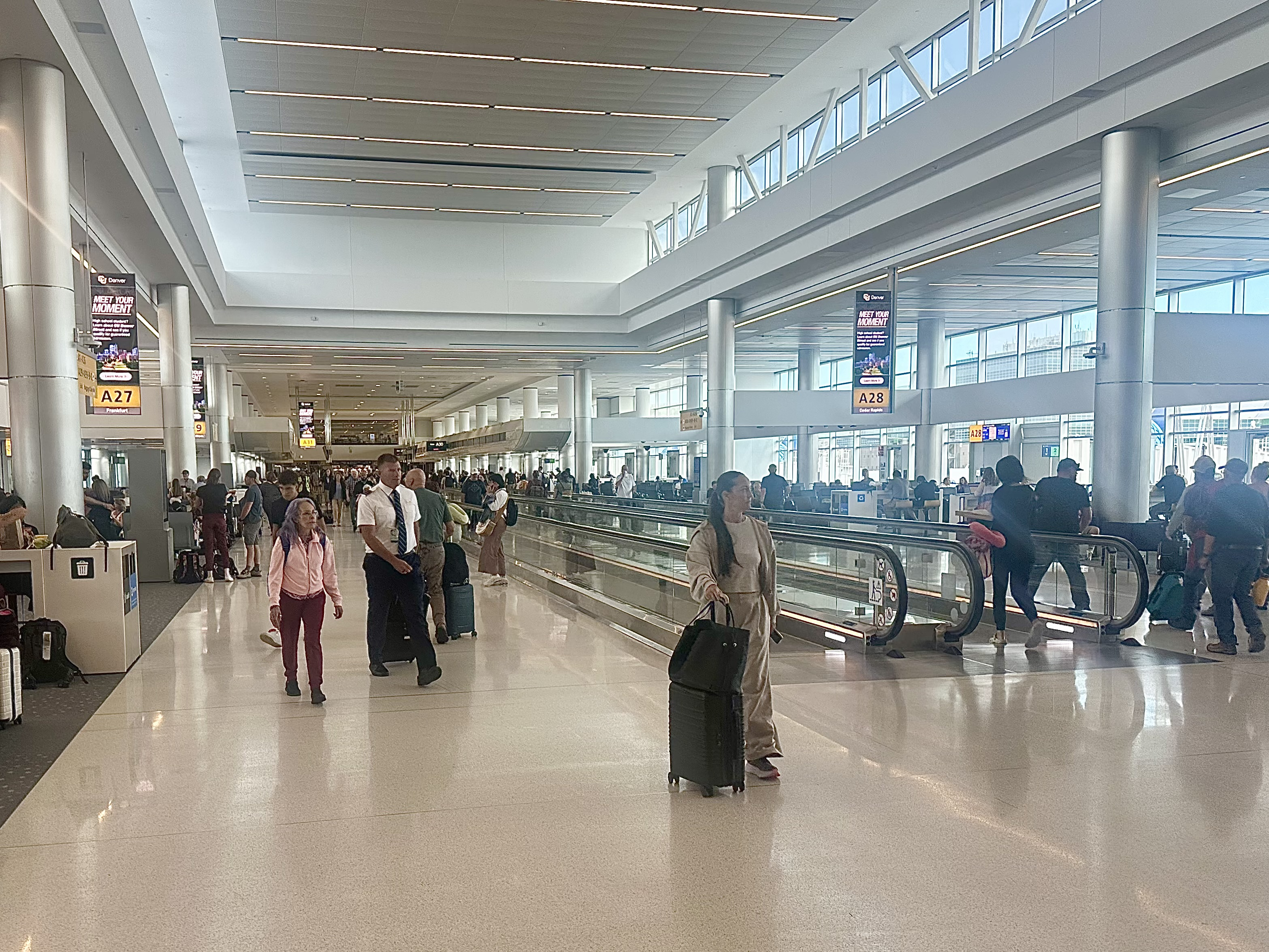
Concourse A, Denver Airport. Moving walkways are present throughout the airport.

- Concourse A is used by Alaska Airlines, Allegiant Air, Breeze Airways, Delta Air Lines, Frontier Airlines, JetBlue, Sun Country Airlines and United Airlines (including all international arrivals), and all international carriers. It has 60 gates, including several ground-level boarding and double jetway gates.
- Concourse B is solely used for United Airlines flights. It has 72 gates, including four double jetways and several regional gates.
- Concourse C is primarily used for Southwest Airlines flights, as well as American Airlines, and the majority regional airliner flights. It has 47 gates, including four ground-level boarding gates.

In 2023, the airport announced a plan to significantly increase its passenger capacity by expanding the Jeppesen Terminal by 2045 with additional check-in and TSA counters. The plan would also add new concourses with a further 100 gates.

=== Security ===
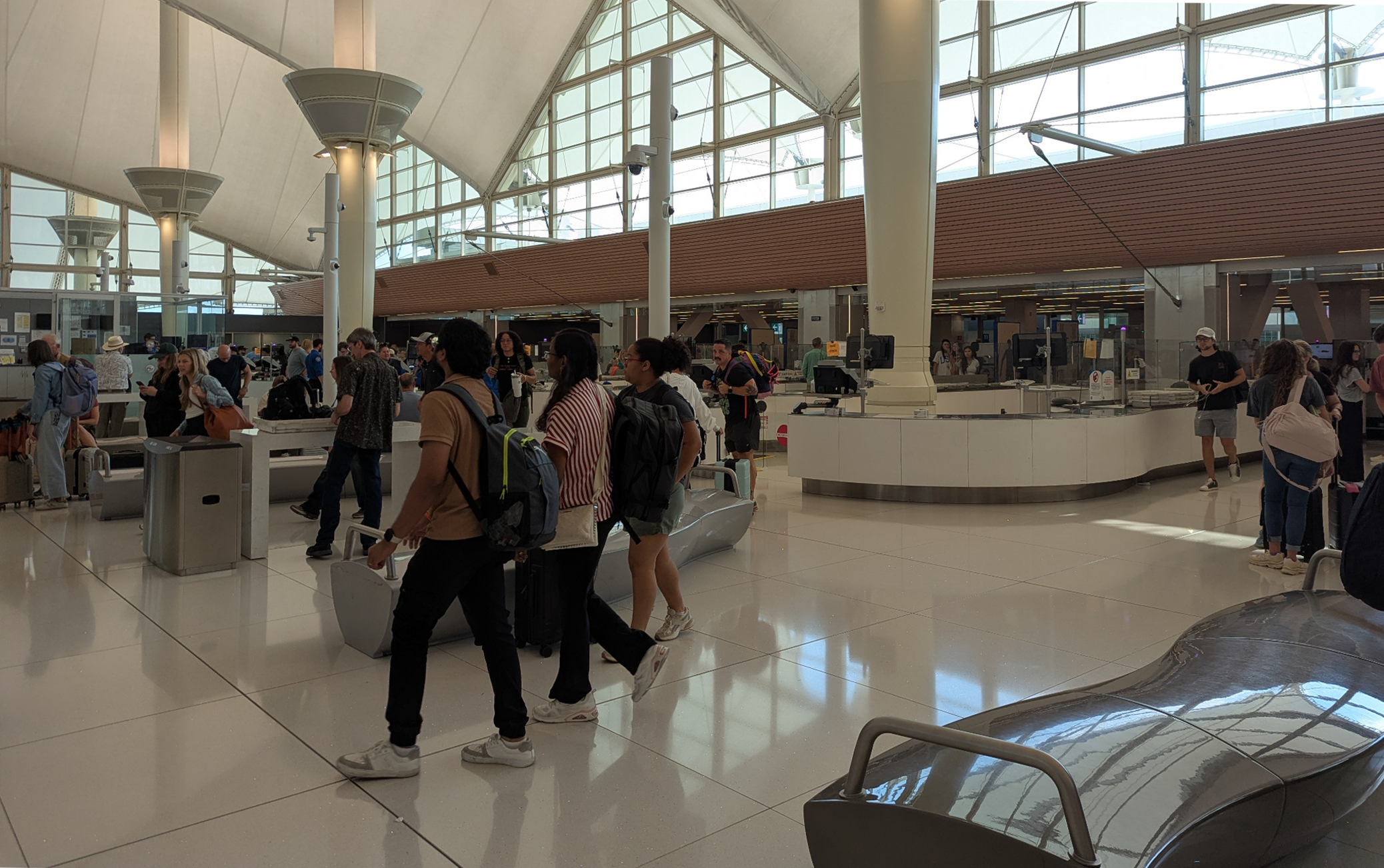
West Security Checkpoint

Passenger security screening at Denver International Airport is operated directly by the Transportation Security Administration (TSA) and is centralized within two closely mirrored checkpoints (East and West Security) located on the east and west sides at the north end of Level 6 in the Jeppesen Terminal. Each checkpoint features 17 screening lanes (34 total).

With the centralization of screening to Level 6, all legacy security areas, including the former South, North, and Bridge checkpoints have been permanently closed as of August 2025. Following these closures and the opening of East and West Security checkpoints, the pedestrian bridge connecting the Jeppesen Terminal to Concourse A reopened as a post-security walkway, allowing screened passengers to walk directly to Concourse A from either the East or West checkpoint as an alternative to the underground train system. Access to Concourses B and C is available exclusively via the train.

Both East and West Security accommodate Standard screening, TSA PreCheck, CLEAR, combined TSA PreCheck with CLEAR, premium/premier access, military personnel, passengers with accessibility needs, and restricted access personnel. DEN Reserve has been discontinued at all security checkpoints.

Operating hours for the checkpoints and screening lanes are as follows:

East Security Checkpoint:

- Standard Screening: 3:00 a.m. to 8:00 p.m. daily
- TSA PreCheck: 4:00 a.m. to 8:00 p.m. daily

West Security Checkpoint:

- Standard Screening: 3:30 a.m. to 1:00 a.m. (next morning) daily
- TSA PreCheck: 4:00 a.m. to 8:45 p.m. daily

Denver International Airport does not offer 24-hour passenger security screening.

=== Art and aesthetics ===
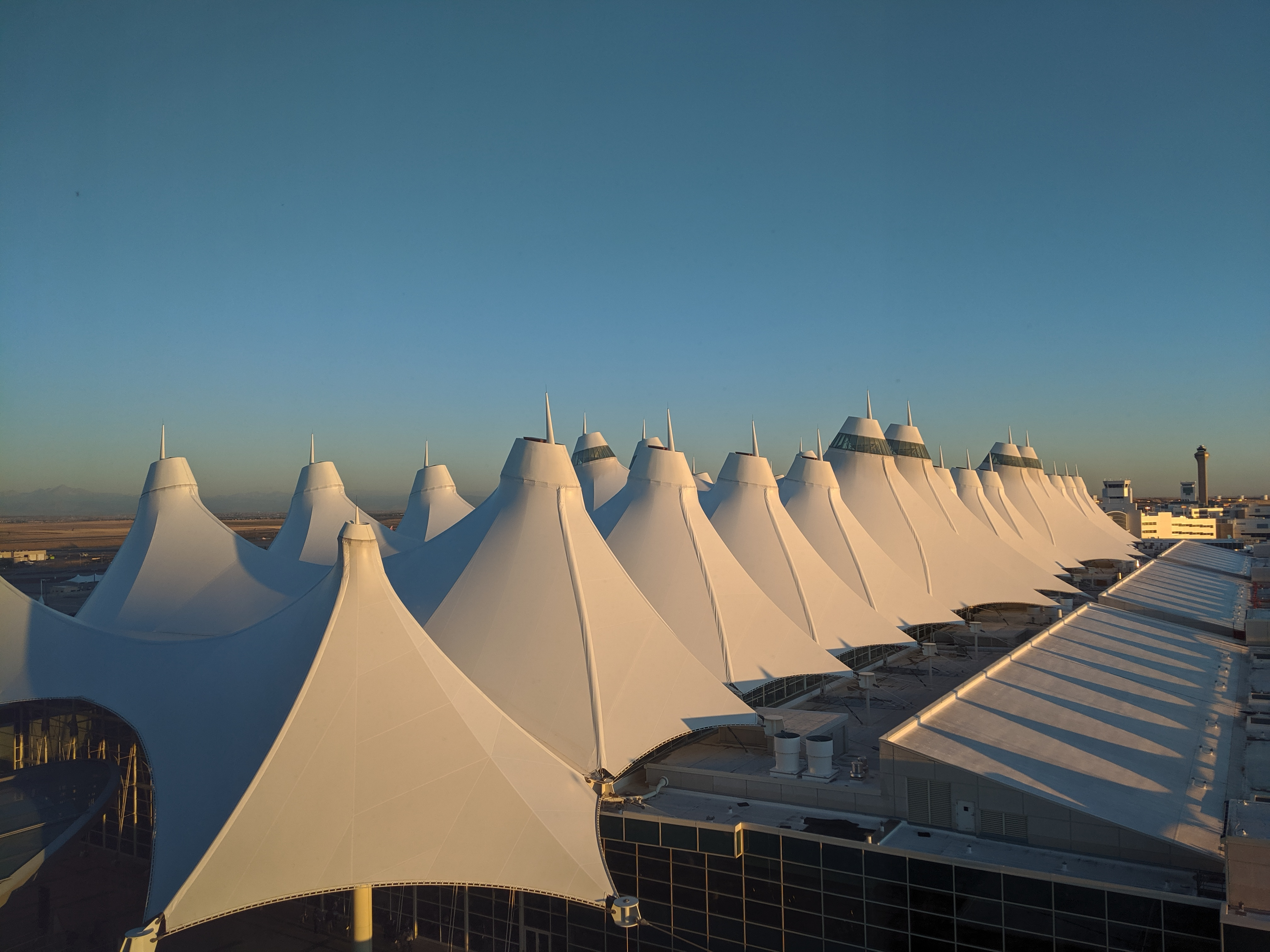
The Teflon-coated fiberglass roof of Denver International Airport alludes to the Rocky Mountains.

The Jeppesen Terminal's internationally recognized peaked roof, designed by Fentress Bradburn Architects, resembles snow-capped mountains and evokes the early history of Colorado when Native American teepees were located across the Great Plains. The catenary steel cable system, similar to the Brooklyn Bridge design, supports the fabric roof. DEN is also known for a pedestrian bridge connecting the terminal to Concourse A that allows travelers to walk from the main Terminal to Concourse A, while viewing planes taxiing beneath them. It offers views of the Rocky Mountains to the west and the high plains to the east.

Denver's public art program (which is financed by a mandatory 1% capital improvement budget) has resulted in a significant number of artworks being installed at the airport. The artwork includes sculptures, murals, photos, sound art and paintings.

The airport features a bronze statue of Denver native Jack Swigert by Loveland, Colorado, artist George Lundeen in Concourse B. Swigert flew on Apollo 13 as Command Module Pilot, and was elected to the House of Representatives in 1982, but died of cancer before he was sworn in. The statue is dressed in an A7L pressure suit, and is posed holding a gold-plated helmet. It is a duplicate of a statue placed at the United States Capitol in 1997. George Lundeen is also the sculptor of The Aviator, a monumental bronze sculpture of Elrey Borge Jeppesen, for whom the terminal is named.

Denver International Airport has four murals by the Chicano artist Leo Tanguma. Children of the World Dream of Peace is in two-parts. The first depicts the horrors of war, with a man in a gasmask brandishing a saber. The second, larger part shows this man toppled, and smiling children from many nations making swords into plowshares; Tanguma explains this is a reference to the Book of Isaiah 2:4:

...and they shall beat their swords into plowshares—nation shall not lift up sword against nation, neither shall they learn war any more.

Per Denver Public Art:

"Children of the World Dream of Peace" is a powerful mural expressing the artist's desire to abolish violence in society. One section of the piece speaks to the tragedy and devastation of war and its impact on humanity. The mural then moves on to images of smiling children, dressed in traditional folk costumes from around the world, celebrating peace prevailing over war.

In Peace and Harmony With Nature is also in two parts; Denver Public Art explains that:

The first half of the mural shows children displaying great sadness over the destruction and extinction of life, as the second half of the artwork depicts humanity coming together to rehabilitate and celebrate nature.

Tanguma confirms this was his intent.

In March 2019, the airport unveiled an animated, talking gargoyle in the middle of one of the concourses. The gargoyle interacted with passengers and joked about the supposed conspiracies connected to the airport.

Blue Mustang, by El Paso-born artist Luis Jiménez, was one of the earliest public art commissions for Denver International Airport in 1993. The 32-foot-tall (9.8 m) sculpture is a bright blue cast-fiberglass sculpture of a horse with glowing red eyes located between the inbound and outbound lanes of Peña Boulevard. Jiménez was killed in 2006 at age 65 while creating the sculpture when a part of it fell on him and severed an artery in his leg. At the time of his death, Jiménez had completed painting the head of the mustang. Blue Mustang was completed by others, and unveiled at the airport on February 11, 2008. The statue has been the subject of considerable controversy, and has acquired the nickname Blucifer for its demonic appearance.

=== Ground transportation ===
The Regional Transportation District (RTD) operates the A Line rail service between DEN and Denver Union Station in downtown Denver, making the 37 minute trip about every 15 minutes. RTD also operates an airport express bus service called skyRide between Arapahoe County or Boulder and DEN. There is also hourly service to Thornton on RTD route 104L, a limited stop bus. The airport is also served by two commuter routes with just a few runs per day: RTD route 145X to Brighton and 169L to Aurora.

Scheduled bus service is also available to points such as Fort Collins, and van services stretch into Nebraska, Wyoming, and Colorado summer and ski resort areas. Amtrak offers a Fly-Rail plan for ticketing with United Airlines for trips into scenic areas in the Western U.S. via a Denver stopover.

The airport is connected to I-70 and Denver via the Peña Boulevard freeway. A number of car rental companies are located at the airport, providing courtesy shuttle services from Jeppesen Terminal Level 5, Island 4, to their parking areas.

The airport claims that it is completely accessible to bicycling travelers. The city of Denver's designated bike route consists of the non-separated shoulders of the 65-mph Peña Boulevard freeway, a route which Denver's former bicycle planner James Mackay has called "a facade, an appearance, a deceit, a contrivance." The airport suggests that cyclists who prefer a less-traveled route may use 56th Avenue to Valleyhead Road, a rural 55-mph highway with no shoulder.

A coach bus "wingless flight", operated by The Landline Company, transports passengers after security screening and connects Denver to the Northern Colorado Regional Airport in Loveland, with further non-secured land route connections to Timnath and Colorado State University.

== Conspiracy theories ==
Conspiracies concerning the airport, inspired by the type of art, unusual architecture, and construction problems, started shortly after its completion. With the expansion of the internet, television shows such as Conspiracy Theory with Jesse Ventura, and annual media reporting of these theories, they continued to grow. Airport administration decided to embrace the conspiracy theories instead of trying to fight them. In 2016, a small "Conspiracy Theories Uncovered" exhibition was installed in the terminal, explaining some of the more popular theories. In 2019, an animatronic gargoyle named Gregoriden, or Greg for short, that randomly makes statements such as "welcome to Illuminati headquarters" was installed. Some took offense to the gargoyle, claiming it was satanic, so the gargoyle was removed and replaced with a more muted version. Other gargoyle statues, sitting on open suitcases, are in the baggage claim area. Some also view these statues as malevolent, despite their intended purpose as playful artistic creations that are claimed to safeguard luggage.

In April 2019, the Roswell International Air Center and Denver International Airport became "supernatural sister airports." In the agreement, they would work together to enhance industry best practices that involve commerce, trade and tourism. It also includes a clause that they would share strategies for extraterrestrial combat. For the airport's 20th birthday, plans to decorate the airport property with crop circles proved to be too expensive, so they were not implemented. In a marketing campaign that was tied to renovations started in 2018, posters were created with aliens joking that breeding grounds for gargoyles or meeting halls for Freemasons were being constructed. The campaign was successful, generating over $8 million in revenue.

=== Theories ===
- Tunnels: The delay in opening the airport and the large budget overrun led to a variety of rumors about the tunnels that were built under the airport. The scope has been exaggerated, and there is lore that the tunnels lead to underground survival bunkers for the rich and elite, military bases, homes for aliens, homes for lizard people, or to the North American Aerospace Defense Command. The actual use for the tunnels is to move luggage between check-in counters, airplanes and baggage claim areas. Employees have been known to prank the media by wearing lizard masks. Blurry videos of lizard people have appeared online and drawings of aliens have appeared on tunnel walls. However, other graffiti, besides alien drawings, exist along the tunnels.
- New World Order and other secret societies: Because of the isolated location, there are rumors that the airport will be used by the New World Order as a prison or concentration camp. The time capsule at the airport showcases an inscribed plaque that has the Freemason symbol and the words "New World Airport Commission," which is a group that has never existed, prompting the conspiracy theory that the airport is controlled by Freemasons and linked to the New World Order or other secret societies. A spokesperson for Denver International Airport, Alex Renteria, has said that the Freemasons had created the cover, and thus had included their symbol, but there is no evidence that they have any influence in running the airport. The wording about the commission was used to represent that the new airport would permit access to the world and is a reference to Dvořák's New World Symphony.
- Nazism: Tanguma's murals have been purported to represent Nazism, death, or a prophecy of the end of the world, counter to the artist's meaning. The removal of the murals to keep them safe during construction prompted rumors that the project was an excuse to cover the truth. In addition, there are conspiracy theories around Nazism based on the supposedly swastika-shaped runway arrangement, which aerial views refute.
- Alien languages: People have noted apparent markings that are supposed to represent alien or secret languages. The markings are actually Navajo language characters and identifiers for the airport artists.
- Blue Mustang eyes: The red, glowing eyes have led some to call the horse statue demonic, thinking that the glowing eyes are referencing the Four Horsemen of the Apocalypse. The eyes are actually a tribute to the artist's father, who owned a neon light shop in Mexico.
- Flat Earth: On TikTok in April 2023, a video went viral, claiming that an artistic 30-year-old world map art installation was new and confirmed flat earth theory.

== Airlines and destinations ==
=== Passenger ===
Airlines	Destinations
Aeroméxico	Mexico City–Benito Juárez; Seasonal: Guadalajara, Monterrey
Air Canada	Montréal–Trudeau, Toronto–Pearson
Air Canada Express	Vancouver
Alaska Airlines	Portland (OR), San Diego, Seattle/Tacoma; Seasonal: Anchorage
Allegiant Air	Asheville, Destin/Fort Walton Beach; Seasonal: Knoxville, Peoria
American Airlines	Charlotte, Chicago–O'Hare, Dallas/Fort Worth, Miami, Philadelphia, Phoenix–Sky Harbor
American Eagle	Los Angeles, Phoenix–Sky Harbor; Seasonal: Dallas/Fort Worth
Avelo Airlines	Dallas/McKinney (begins December 16, 2026)
Breeze Airways	Seasonal: Providence
British Airways	London–Heathrow
Cayman Airways	Seasonal: Grand Cayman
Contour Airlines	Carlsbad (NM), Ruidoso, Vernal; Seasonal: Page, Taos
Copa Airlines	Panama City–Tocumen
Delta Air Lines	Atlanta, Boston, Detroit, Los Angeles, Minneapolis/St. Paul, New York–JFK, New York–LaGuardia, Salt Lake City, Seattle/Tacoma
Delta Connection	Austin
Denver Air Connection	Alamosa, Alliance, Chadron, Clovis (NM), Cortez, McCook, Pueblo, Telluride (CO)
Frontier Airlines	Atlanta, Austin, Charlotte, Chicago–O'Hare, Cincinnati, Cleveland, Dallas/Fort Worth, Des Moines, Detroit, El Paso, Fargo, Fayetteville/Bentonville, Fort Lauderdale, Houston–Hobby, Houston–Intercontinental, Indianapolis, Kansas City, Las Vegas, Los Angeles, Memphis, Miami, Minneapolis/St. Paul, Nashville, New Orleans, Oklahoma City, Omaha, Ontario, Orange County, Orlando, Pensacola, Philadelphia, Phoenix–Sky Harbor, Portland (OR), Raleigh/Durham, Reno/Tahoe, Sacramento, Salt Lake City, San Antonio, San Diego, San Francisco, Seattle/Tacoma, St. Louis, Tampa, Washington–National; Seasonal: Baltimore, Buffalo, Cancún, Columbus–Glenn, Fort Myers, Jacksonville (FL),
Icelandair	Reykjavík–Keflavík
JetBlue	Boston, New York–JFK
Lufthansa	Frankfurt, Munich
Southwest Airlines	Albuquerque, Atlanta, Austin, Baltimore, Birmingham (AL), Boise, Boston, Bozeman, Burbank, Cancún, Chicago–Midway, Cincinnati, Cleveland, Colorado Springs, Columbus–Glenn, Dallas–Love, Des Moines, Detroit, El Paso, Eugene, Fort Lauderdale, Fresno, Grand Rapids, Hayden/Steamboat Springs, Houston–Hobby, Indianapolis, Jacksonville (FL), Kansas City, Las Vegas, Little Rock, Long Beach, Los Angeles, Louisville, Lubbock, Memphis, Miami, Midland/Odessa, Milwaukee, Minneapolis/St. Paul, Montrose, Nashville, New Orleans, New York–LaGuardia, Oakland, Oklahoma City, Omaha, Ontario, Orange County (CA), Orlando, Palm Springs, Philadelphia, Phoenix–Sky Harbor, Pittsburgh, Portland (OR), Puerto Vallarta, Raleigh/Durham, Reno/Tahoe, Richmond, Sacramento, Salt Lake City, San Antonio, San Diego, San Francisco, San Jose (CA), San José del Cabo, Santa Barbara, Santa Rosa, Seattle/Tacoma, Spokane, St. Louis, Tampa, Tucson, Tulsa, Wichita; Seasonal: Albany, Anchorage, Belize City, Buffalo, Charleston (SC), Charlotte, Fort Myers, Greenville/Spartanburg, Hartford, Knoxville, Liberia (CR), Myrtle Beach, Norfolk, Panama City (FL), Pensacola, Providence, San José (CR), Sarasota, Savannah
Sun Country Airlines	Belleville/St. Louis (begins May 28, 2027), Cincinnati (begins May 27, 2027), Minneapolis/St. Paul
Turkish Airlines	Istanbul
United Airlines	Albany, Albuquerque, Appleton, Anchorage, Atlanta, Austin, Baltimore, Billings, Boise, Boston, Bozeman, Buffalo, Burbank, Calgary, Cancún, Cedar Rapids/Iowa City, Charleston (SC), Charlotte, Chicago–O'Hare, Cincinnati, Cleveland, Colorado Springs, Columbus–Glenn, Dallas/Fort Worth, Des Moines, Detroit, Durango (CO), Eagle/Vail, Edmonton, El Paso, Eugene, Fargo, Fayetteville/Bentonville, Fort Lauderdale, Fort Myers, Frankfurt, Fresno, Glacier Park/Kalispell, Grand Junction, Grand Rapids, Greenville/Spartanburg, Hartford, Hayden/Steamboat Springs, Honolulu, Houston–Intercontinental, Indianapolis, Jackson Hole, Jacksonville (FL), Kahului, Kailua-Kona, Kansas City, Knoxville, Las Vegas, Lihue, Little Rock, London–Heathrow, Los Angeles, Louisville, Madison, Medford, Memphis, Miami, Milwaukee, Minneapolis/St. Paul, Missoula, Montego Bay, Montrose, Munich, Nashville, New Orleans, New York–LaGuardia, Newark, Norfolk, Omaha, Ontario, Orange County, Orlando, Palm Springs, Panama City (FL), Paris–Charles de Gaulle (begins May 27, 2027), Pensacola, Philadelphia, Phoenix–Sky Harbor, Pittsburgh, Portland (OR), Puerto Vallarta, Punta Cana, Raleigh/Durham, Rapid City, Redmond/Bend, Reno/Tahoe, Richmond, Sacramento, Salt Lake City, San Antonio, San Diego, San Francisco, San Jose (CA), San José del Cabo, San Juan, San Luis Obispo, Santa Barbara, Savannah, Seattle/Tacoma, Sioux Falls, Spokane, St. Louis, Syracuse, Tampa, Tokyo–Narita, Toronto–Pearson, Tucson, Tulsa, Vancouver, Washington–Dulles, Washington–National, Wichita; Seasonal: Bangor, Belize City, Burlington (VT), Cozumel, Dayton, Fairbanks, Great Falls, Liberia (CR), Mexico City–Benito Juárez, Myrtle Beach, Nassau, Oklahoma City, Portland (ME), Québec City (begins May 29, 2027), Roatán, Rome–Fiumicino, San José (CR), Sarasota, Traverse City, Tri-Cities (WA), West Palm Beach
United Express	Abilene, Albuquerque, Amarillo, Appleton, Asheville, Aspen, Bakersfield, Billings, Birmingham (AL), Bismarck, Boise, Bozeman, Butte, Casper, Cheyenne, Cody, Colorado Springs, Columbia (MO), Dayton, Des Moines, Devils Lake, Dickinson, Dodge City, Durango (CO), Eagle/Vail, El Paso, Eureka, Fargo, Farmington, Fayetteville/Bentonville, Flagstaff (resumes August 10, 2027), Fresno, Gillette, Glacier Park/Kalispell, Grand Junction, Great Falls, Greenville/Spartanburg, Gunnison/Crested Butte, Hayden/Steamboat Springs, Hays, Helena, Hobbs, Huntsville, Idaho Falls, Jackson Hole, Jamestown (ND), Joplin, Kansas City, Kearney, Knoxville, Laramie, Lexington, Liberal, Lincoln, Little Rock, Lubbock, Midland/Odessa, Minot, Missoula, Moab, Moline/Quad Cities, Monterey, Montrose, North Platte, Oklahoma City, Palm Springs, Panama City (FL), Peoria, Pierre, Prescott, Rapid City, Redding, Regina, Riverton, Rock Springs, Roswell, Salina, Salt Lake City, San Diego/Carlsbad, San Luis Obispo, Santa Fe, Scottsbluff, Sheridan (WY), Shreveport, Sioux City, Sioux Falls, Springfield/Branson, St. George (UT), Sun Valley, Tri-Cities (WA), Tucson, Tulsa, Watertown (SD), Wichita, Williston (ND), Winnipeg; Seasonal: Bishop, Chattanooga, Eugene, Harlingen, Medford, Milwaukee, Minneapolis/St. Paul, North Bend/Coos Bay, Omaha, Ottawa (begins April 29, 2027), Santa Barbara, Spokane, Traverse City, West Yellowstone, Wilmington (NC)
Viva	Monterrey
Volaris	Chihuahua, Guadalajara, Mexico City–Benito Juárez, Querétaro
WestJet	Seasonal: Calgary

== Statistics ==
=== Top destinations ===
Busiest domestic routes from DEN (September 2025 – August 2026)
Rank	City	Passengers	Carriers
1	Phoenix–Sky Harbor, Arizona	1,207,523	American, Frontier, Southwest, United
2	Los Angeles, California	1,037,735	American, Delta, Frontier, Southwest, United
3	Las Vegas, Nevada	1,035,779	Frontier, Southwest, United
4	Chicago–O'Hare, Illinois	973,773	American, Frontier, Southwest, United
5	Seattle/Tacoma, Washington	909,469	Alaska, Delta, Frontier, Southwest, United
6	San Francisco, California	899,884	Frontier, Southwest, United
7	Salt Lake City, Utah	897,796	Delta, Frontier, Southwest, United
8	Dallas/Fort Worth, Texas	868,733	American, Frontier, United
9	Minneapolis/St. Paul, Minnesota	851,546	Delta, Frontier, Southwest, Sun Country, United
10	Atlanta, Georgia	850,676	Delta, Frontier, Southwest, United

Busiest international routes from DEN (September 2025 – August 2026)
Rank	Airport	Passengers	Carriers
1	Cancún, Mexico	481,532	Frontier, Southwest, United
2	Vancouver, Canada	424,184	Air Canada, United
3	London–Heathrow, United Kingdom	407,696	British Airways, United
4	Frankfurt, Germany	324,679	Lufthansa, United
5	Munich, Germany	317,951	Lufthansa, United
6	Mexico City, Mexico	281,012	Aeroméxico, United, Volaris
7	Calgary, Canada	268,170	United, WestJet
8	Toronto–Pearson, Canada	259,500	Air Canada, United
9	San José del Cabo, Mexico	247,306	Frontier, Southwest, United
10	Edmonton, Canada	201,329	United

=== Airline market share ===
Largest Airlines at DEN (September 2025 – August 2026)
Rank	Airline	Passengers	Share
1	United Airlines (Note: Includes United Express flights operated by CommuteAir, Mesa Airlines and SkyWest Airlines.)	40,720,702	50.6%
2	Southwest Airlines	23,078,555	28.7%
3	Frontier Airlines	7,606,576	9.5%
4	Delta Air Lines (Note: Includes Delta Connection flights operated by SkyWest Airlines.)	3,165,784	3.9%
5	American Airlines (Note: Includes American Eagle flights operated by Envoy Air and SkyWest Airlines.)	2,673,854	3.3%
–	Other Airlines	3,200,000	3.9%

=== Annual traffic ===
Annual passenger traffic at DEN, 1995–present
Year	Passengers	Year	Passengers	Year	Passengers	Year	Passengers
1995	31,067,498 (Note: Passenger totals for first two months of 1995 reflect operations at Stapleton International Airport.)	2005	43,387,369	2015	54,014,502	2025	82,427,962
1996	32,296,174	2006	47,326,506	2016	58,266,515	2026	
1997	34,969,837	2007	49,863,352	2017	61,379,396	2027	
1998	36,831,400	2008	51,245,334	2018	64,494,613	2028	
1999	38,034,017	2009	50,167,485	2019	69,015,703	2029	
2000	38,751,687	2010	51,985,038	2020	33,741,129	2030	
2001	36,092,806	2011	52,849,132	2021	58,828,552	2031	
2002	35,652,084	2012	53,156,278	2022	69,286,461	2032	
2003	37,505,267	2013	52,556,359	2023	77,837,917	2033	
2004	42,275,913	2014	53,472,514	2024	82,358,744	2034	

== Accidents and incidents ==
- On December 20, 2008, Continental Airlines Flight 1404, a Boeing 737-500 bound for George Bush Intercontinental Airport in Houston, departed the left side of runway 34R during the takeoff roll during high (30 knots) crosswinds. A post-crash fire ensued. There were 6 serious injuries and 41 minor injuries, and 68 passengers were uninjured. There were no fatalities. The aircraft was destroyed and written off. The captain's cessation of right rudder input during takeoff was the major cause of the accident.
- On May 8, 2026, Frontier Airlines Flight 4345, an Airbus A321neo bound for Los Angeles International Airport was taking off on runway 17L when it struck and killed a trespasser who had jumped over the perimeter fence. The aircraft stopped on the runway. The collision caused an engine fire, prompting passengers to evacuate via the escape slides.

== See also ==
- Busiest airports in the United States by international passenger traffic
- Busiest airports in the United States by total passenger boardings
- List of airports in Colorado
- List of airports in the Denver area
- List of airports with triple takeoff/landing capability
- List of the busiest airports in the United States
- List of longest runways
- Megaprojects and Risk: An Anatomy of Ambition
- World's busiest airports by passenger traffic
- World's busiest airports by traffic movements
- World's busiest airports by cargo traffic
- World's busiest airports by international passenger traffic
- List of tallest air traffic control towers in the United States
