= Montrose Regional Airport =

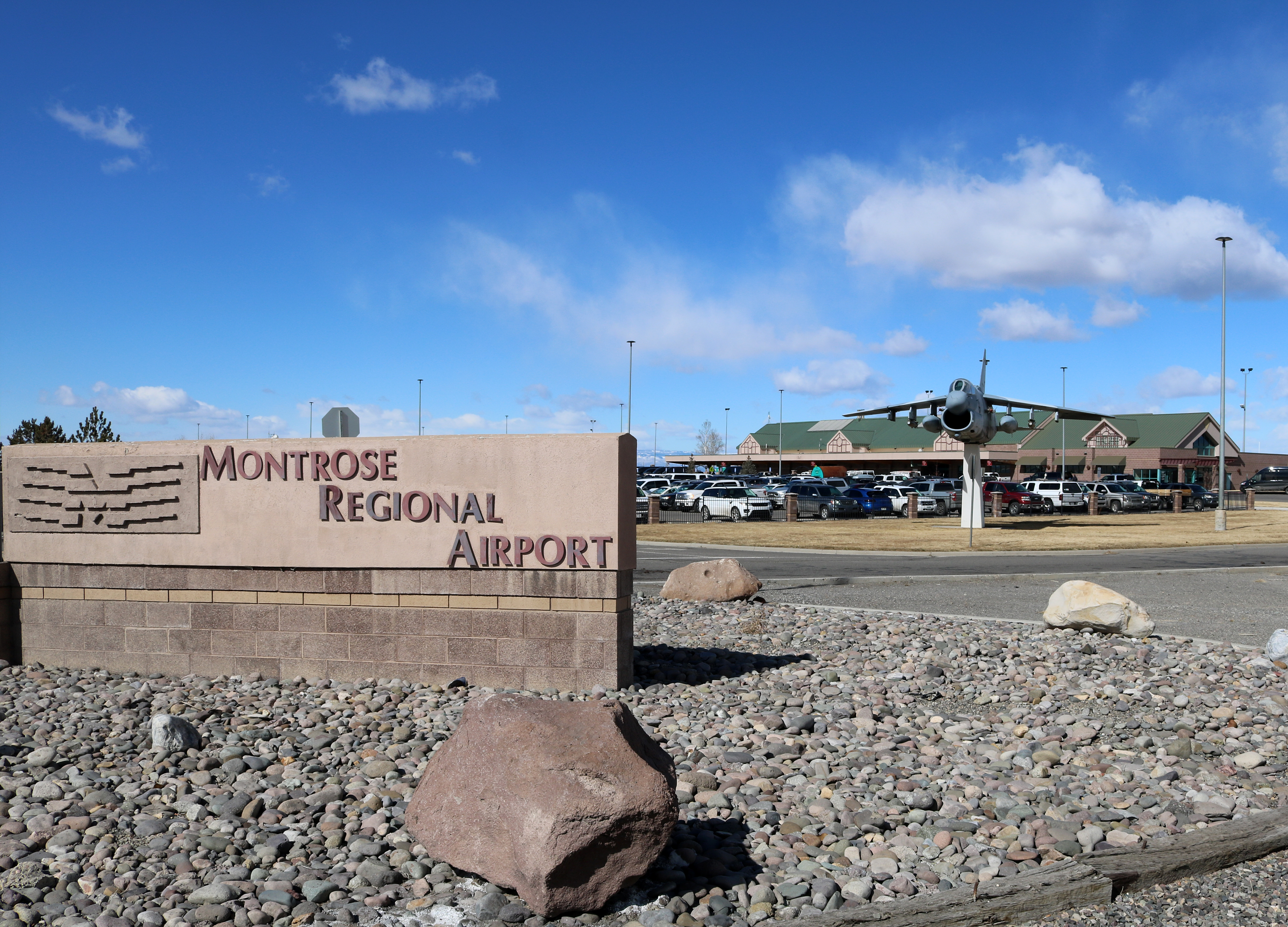
- The entrance sign with the terminal building in the background
- IATA: MTJ; ICAO: KMTJ; FAA LID: MTJ

Summary
- Airport type: Public
- Operator: Montrose County
- Location: Montrose, Colorado
- Elevation AMSL: 5,759 ft (1,755 m)
- Coordinates: 38°30′35.26″N 107°53′39.27″W
- Website: www.flymontrose.com

Maps
- FAA airport diagram
- Interactive map of Montrose Regional Airport

Runways
Direction	Length		Surface
Direction	ft	m	Surface
17/35	10,000	3,048	Asphalt
13/31	7,510	2,289	Asphalt
- Source: Federal Aviation Administration

Montrose Regional Airport (IATA: MTJ, ICAO: KMTJ, FAA LID: MTJ) is a non-towered public airport on the northwest side of Montrose, in zip code 81401 in southwestern Colorado. Its two runways are at elevation 5,759 feet (1,755 m). MTJ covers 966 acres (391 ha) of land.

Monarch Airlines started flying to Montrose in the 1940s. Successor Frontier Airlines (1950-1986) flew to the present airport since the 1950s; the first jets were Frontier Boeing 737-200s in 1982 (runway 12/30 was then 8500 ft). Earlier, Frontier flew Convair 580s between Montrose and Denver.

An enhanced and expanded Montrose Regional Airport was dedicated on June 25, 1988, with Chuck Yeager cutting the ribbon. The airport terminal was designed by local architect Patrik Davis "to greet visitors with small-town hospitality. A two-sided fireplace is the centerpiece of the passenger seating area, which has a tile floor patterned with the Ute pictogram for travel and a high, skylighted ceiling of knotty pine. The walls are earthy, ground-face cinderblock, and natural-finished glue-laminated beams extend over wide walkways. The gable roof has skylights and dormers decorated with the Hopi good luck symbol."

Its runway 17/35 (10,000 feet in length) was built during the 1990s.

The airport is most busy during its winter season, serving many skiers headed to Telluride Ski Resort, an hour and a half away by road; it is also busy serving summer tourism in the area. Outside the winter and summer seasons, the only major airline flights are United Express and Southwest Airlines flights to Denver and American Eagle flights to Dallas/Fort Worth. Direct flights to Chicago, Los Angeles, New York, Houston, San Francisco and Atlanta are offered in peak seasons, with the most flights on Saturdays.

Montrose Regional is the nearest airport with regularly scheduled mainline passenger jets to ski areas around Telluride. Some direct service to Telluride's small airport is offered by Denver Air Connection, with Montrose serving as the alternative, backup destination when weather would close the high-elevation Telluride airport.

== Airlines and destinations ==
=== Passenger ===
Airlines	Destinations	Refs
American Airlines	Seasonal: Dallas/Fort Worth	
Breeze Airways	Seasonal: Orange County	
Delta Air Lines	Seasonal: Atlanta	
Southwest Airlines	Denver; Seasonal: Dallas–Love, Nashville	
United Airlines	Denver; Seasonal: Chicago–O'Hare, Houston–Intercontinental, Newark	
United Express	Denver; Seasonal: Chicago–O'Hare, Houston–Intercontinental, Los Angeles, San Francisco	

Destinations map
Destinations from Montrose Regional Airport
Red = Year-round destination
Green = Seasonal destination
Blue = Future destination

== Statistics ==
=== Top destinations ===
Busiest domestic routes from MTJ (January 2025 – December 2025)
Rank	City	Passengers	Airlines
1	Denver, Colorado	147,190	United, Southwest
2	Dallas/Fort Worth, Texas	59,050	American
3	Atlanta, Georgia	10,320	Delta
4	Houston–Intercontinental, Texas	10,140	United
5	Chicago–O'Hare, Illinois	6,950	United
6	Newark, New Jersey	6,790	United
7	Dallas-Love Field, Texas	6,270	Southwest
8	Orange County, California	2,730	Breeze
9	San Francisco, California	2,270	United
10	Los Angeles, California	1,730	United

=== Airline market share ===
Airline market share (January 2025 – December 2025)
Rank	Carrier	Passengers	Market Share
1	United	196,000	38.95%
2	Southwest	111,000	22.07%
3	American	86,900	17.30%
4	SkyWest	35,610	7.09%
5	Envoy	27,790	5.53%
	Others	45,490	9.06%

== 2010-2011 terminal project ==
Montrose Regional Airport remodeled and expanded the passenger terminal, adding 10,935 square feet (1,015.9 m^{2}) by lengthening the terminal 80 feet (24 m) to the south. The expansion added space for passenger check-in, larger departure lounge, and space at the security checkpoint.

== Based aircraft and operations ==
In the year ending December 31, 2022, the airport had 23,414 aircraft operations, average 64 per day: 26% air carrier, 1% air taxi, 72% general aviation and 1% military. At the time, there were 93 aircraft based at MTJ, 70 single-engine, 13 multi-engine, 3 jets, 3 helicopters, 3 gliders and 1 ultra-light.

== Major accidents near MTJ ==
- On April 13, 1973, a Continental Airlines North American Sabreliner on a positioning flight crashed shortly after takeoff when a thrust reverser deployed in flight. Both occupants on board were killed.
- On November 28, 2004, a Global Aviation Canadair CL-600 with six occupants on board crashed shortly after takeoff due to ice and snow contamination on the wings. Two crew members and one passenger, the son of Dick Ebersol and Susan Saint James, died.
- On June 23, 2025, a Murphy Moose on a ferrying/positioning flight crashed shortly after takeoff from Montrose. Both occupants were killed.

== See also ==
- List of airports in Colorado
