= Yampa Valley Airport =

Airport in Colorado, United States of America

Yampa Valley Regional Airport

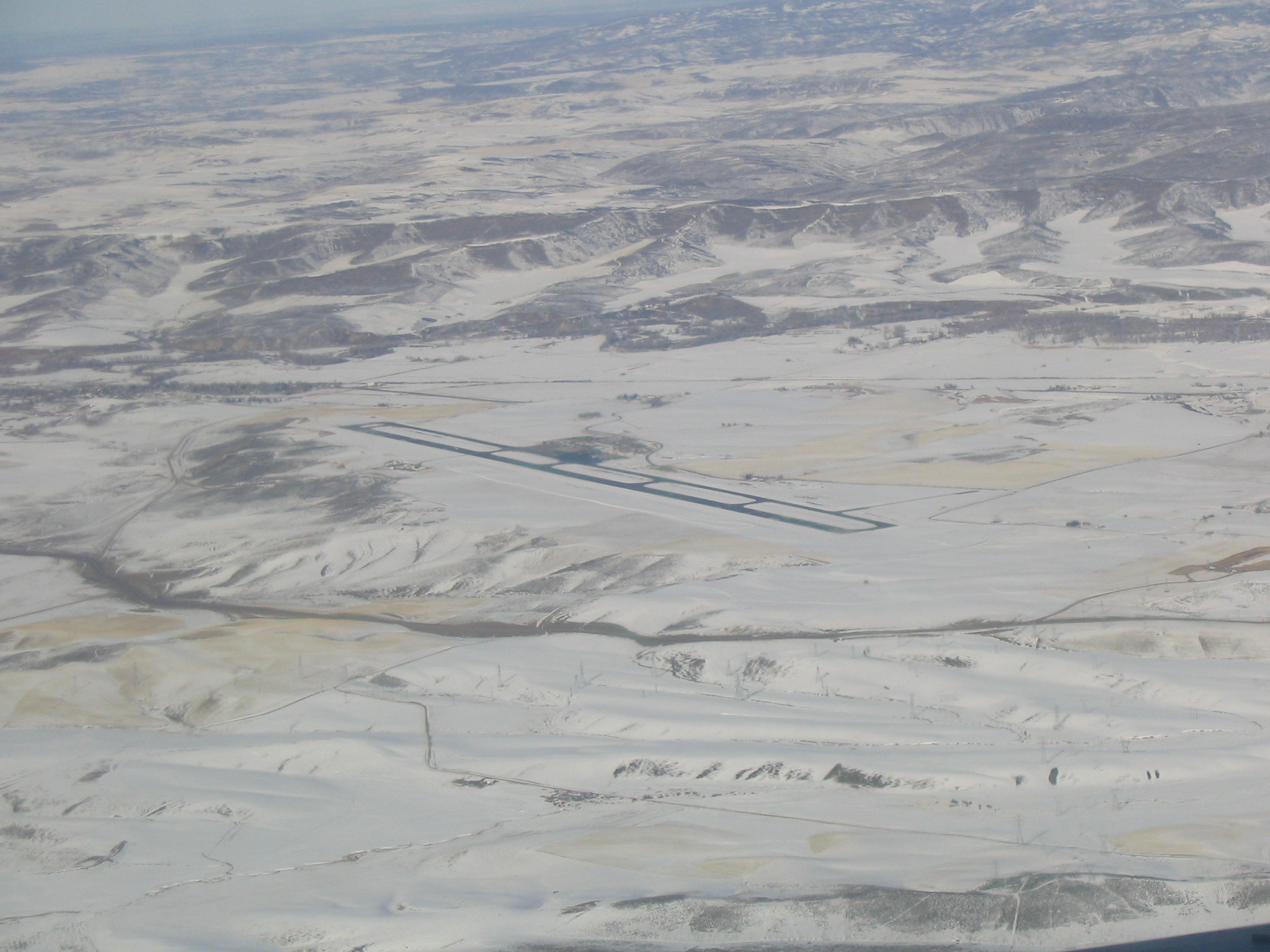
- Aerial view, December 2004
- IATA: HDN; ICAO: KHDN; FAA LID: HDN

Summary
- Airport type: Public
- Owner: Routt County
- Operator: Routt County
- Serves: Steamboat Springs, Hayden, Craig
- Location: Hayden, Colorado
- Elevation AMSL: 6,606 ft (2,014 m)
- Coordinates: 40°28′52″N 107°13′04″W
- Website: flysteamboat.com

Map
- Location within Colorado Location within the United States

Runways
Direction	Length		Surface
Direction	ft	m	Surface
10/28	10,000	3,048	Asphalt

Statistics (2018)
- Aircraft operations: 11,474
- Based aircraft: 8
- Sources: Routt County FAA

Yampa Valley Regional Airport (IATA: HDN, ICAO: KHDN, FAA LID: HDN) is in Routt County, Colorado, United States, serving the communities of Steamboat Springs, Hayden, and Craig, Colorado. The airport is two miles southeast of Hayden, about 20 miles east of Craig and about 25 miles (40 km) west of Steamboat Springs. It has the only scheduled passenger flights in northwest Colorado. It is also used by larger business jets that cannot use the smaller Steamboat Springs Airport (Bob Adams Field).

The National Plan of Integrated Airport Systems for 2021–2025 called it a primary commercial service airport (more than 10,000 enplanements per year). Federal Aviation Administration records say it had 87,902 passenger boardings (enplanements) in calendar year 2019, 106,007 in 2020 and 150,142 in 2021.

== Facilities ==
Yampa Valley Airport Regional covers 671 acres (272 ha) at an elevation of 6,606 feet (2,014 m). Its asphalt runway, 10/28, is 10,000 by 150 feet (3,048 by 46 m).

In 2018, the airport completed an expansion of the apron that added a seventh aircraft parking position; in 2020 the terminal was being expanded to add a seventh gate and expanded ticketing area. The two projects cost about $10 million. The airport has nine commercial aircraft parking spots and seven gates that can handle Boeing 757s, Boeing 737s, Airbus A320/A320neos, Bombardier CRJ200s, Bombardier CRJ700/CRJ900s, Airbus A220s, Embraer 135/145s, and Embraer 170/175/190/195 Like other Colorado airports serving ski resorts, there are no jet bridges, only open air airstairs. The private ramp can handle up to 40 private jets. In the winter months larger private jets such as the Boeing 737 cannot be parked due to lack of space and must depart after deplaning passengers.

== Airport procedures ==
The airport has no air traffic control tower. All aircraft are on a CTAF (123.0) and/or Unicom and receive airfield advisories from Unicom during hours of commercial operations. All aircraft receive approach control services from the Denver Air Route Traffic Control Center. Gates and aircraft parking slots can be assigned by Unicom or via the airline operations radio communication channels. Jet A fuel is provided by the FBO (fixed-base operator), Atlantic Aviation. All aircraft departing runway 28 make a right or left turn to avoid the populated area of Hayden. Runway 10 has an Instrument Landing System (ILS). Snow and low ceilings during winter months cause some aircraft to divert to other airports including Denver International Airport.

== Airport operations ==
In the year ending 31 December 2021 the airport had 15,497 aircraft operations, average 42 per day: 56% general aviation, 32% scheduled airline, 34% air taxi, and 1.4% military. Eighteen aircraft were then based at this airport: four single-engine and fourteen multi-engine.

The airport has two ARFF trucks in the operations garage that are run by full-time and seasonal firefighters. They operate ARFF index C from December to March, and ARFF index B from April to November. The ARFF trucks are staffed by firefighters when a scheduled flight is arriving or departing with more than 10 passengers. Local fire departments, like The West Routt Fire Protection District and the North Routt Fire Protection District, can respond to the airport if mutual aid is needed. Transportation can be provided by local taxi, Lyft, Uber, and three shuttle companies with staffed help desks in the baggage claim terminal.

== Airlines and destinations ==
Airlines	Destinations
Alaska Airlines	Seasonal: Portland (OR) (begins February 11, 2027), San Diego, Seattle/Tacoma
American Airlines	Seasonal: Dallas/Fort Worth
American Eagle	Seasonal: Chicago–O'Hare
Delta Air Lines	Seasonal: Atlanta, Minneapolis/St. Paul
JetBlue	Seasonal: Boston, Fort Lauderdale
Southwest Airlines	Denver; Seasonal: Austin, Dallas–Love, Nashville
United Airlines	Denver; Seasonal: Chicago–O'Hare, Newark, Washington–Dulles
United Express	Denver; Seasonal: Houston–Intercontinental, Los Angeles, San Francisco

Destinations map
Destinations from Yampa Valley Airport
Red = Year-round destination
Green = Seasonal destination
Blue = Future destination

=== Historical airline service ===
Yampa Valley Airport was first served by the original Frontier Airlines with nonstop flights to Denver and direct flights to Salt Lake City with two stops. The service ran year round from late 1966 until early 1982 and Convair 580 turboprop aircraft were used. Rocky Mountain Airways then operated flights to Denver but used the Steamboat Springs Airport. Yampa Valley Airport began seeing seasonal ski service during the winter of 1985/1986 when Aspen Airways flew British Aerospace 146 four engine jets to Denver. During the 1986/1987 season, PSA provided flights to Los Angeles and San Francisco using McDonnell Douglas MD-80 jets. American Airlines then began regular seasonal service beginning with the 1987/1988 season and multiple other carriers followed in the years after that. During the 1990s and 2000s Yampa Valley Airport also saw service by Continental Airlines, Northwest Airlines, and TWA. During the 2000/2001 season, the second Midway Airlines (1993-2003) provided nonstop service to Raleigh/Durham, NC. Most major carriers now serve the airport on a seasonal basis while United and Southwest Airlines provide year-round service.

== Statistics ==
=== Top destinations ===
Busiest domestic routes from HDN (January 2025 – December 2025)
Rank	Airport	Passengers	Carriers
1	Denver, Colorado	133,390	Southwest, United
2	Dallas/Fort Worth, Texas	17,520	American
3	Chicago O'Hare, Illinois	14,580	American, United
4	Atlanta, Georgia	14,510	Delta
5	Newark, New Jersey	10,260	United
6	Houston–Intercontinental, Texas	8,940	United
7	Dallas Love Field, Texas	7,770	Southwest
8	Boston, Massachusetts	3,670	JetBlue
9	Los Angeles, California	3,640	United
10	Minneapolis/St. Paul, Minnesota	3,230	Delta

=== Airline market share ===
Largest airlines at HDN (January 2025 – December 2025)
Rank	Airline	Passengers	Share
1	United	180,000	39.55%
2	Southwest	111,000	24.30%
3	SkyWest	63,690	13.99%
4	Delta	35,560	7.81%
5	American	34,410	7.56%
	Other	30,870	6.78%

All seasonal flights during ski season begin in December and end in April. The only year-round scheduled flights are to Denver International Airport by SkyWest flying as United Express, as well as flights to Denver International Airport and Dallas Love Field by Southwest Airlines. Mainline jets operated by the three major airlines during ski season include the Airbus A319 and A320 as well as the Boeing 737-800, Boeing 717 and 757-200.

== Accidents and incidents ==
- At 13:56 on 14 March 2001, TWA flight 641, a McDonnell Douglas MD-81 from St. Louis Lambert International Airport with 122 passengers and crew, mistakenly landed at the Craig-Moffat Airport (CAG) while on approach into the Yampa Valley Airport during a snowstorm. Craig-Moffat Airport is located approximately 17 miles west of Hayden, Colorado, and its only runway, 7/25, measures 5,600 feet—nearly half that of the Yampa Valley Airport's 10,000 foot runway 10/28. Though the flight landed safely with no injuries, the aircraft did get stuck in mud while attempting a turn at the end of the runway. Passengers were eventually bussed to the Yampa Valley Airport.
- At 11:57 on 22 January 2022, JetBlue Airways flight 1748, an Airbus A320-232 bound for Fort Lauderdale–Hollywood International Airport, suffered a tailstrike on takeoff. As the flight was rolling for takeoff on runway 10, a Beechcraft Super King Air 350 (N350J) was approaching from the opposite direction for a landing on runway 28 at the other end. ADS-B data suggest that the King Air was about 5300 m (2.86 nm) short of the threshold of runway 28 when JetBlue 1748 started rolling for takeoff on runway 10. Horizontal separation when the two aircraft passed, was about 800 meters (2,600 ft). The flight was diverted to Denver International Airport and landed safely with no further incident.

== See also ==
- List of airports in Colorado
