= Buffalo Pass =

Buffalo Pass may refer to:

- Bualli Pass, also translated as Buffalo Pass, Albania
- Buffalo Pass (South Africa), a pass of the Eastern Cape
- Buffalo Pass (Hong Kong), a pass on the MacLehose Trail in Hong Kong
- Buffalo Pass (Arizona), a pass in the Lukachukai Mountains in Apache County, Arizona, United States
- Buffalo Pass (Continental Divide), a mountain pass on the Continental Divide of the Americas in the Park Range of Colorado, United States

== See also ==
- Buffalo Pass, Scalplock, & Defiance Railroad, a fictional railroad in the American TV series Iron Horse
- Rocky Mountain Airways Flight 217, a plane crash that occurred at Buffalo Pass on the Continental Divide in Colorado
- Buffalo (disambiguation)
- List of mountain passes
