= Gunnison–Crested Butte Regional Airport =

Airport in Colorado, United States

Gunnison-Crested Butte Regional Airport

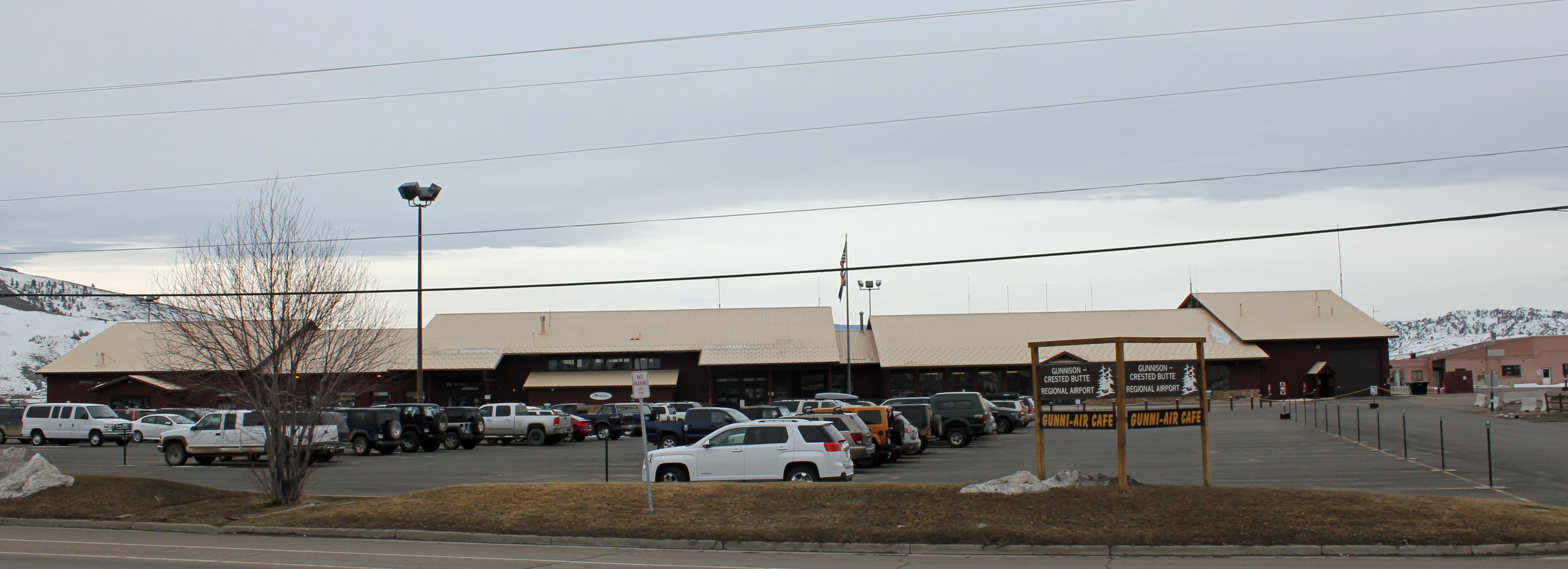
- The terminal building in 2014
- IATA: GUC; ICAO: KGUC; FAA LID: GUC

Summary
- Airport type: Public
- Owner: County of Gunnison
- Serves: Gunnison, Colorado
- Elevation AMSL: 7,680 ft (2,340 m)
- Coordinates: 38°32′02″N 106°55′59″W
- Website: Official website

Map
- Location of airport in Colorado GUC (the United States)

Runways
Direction	Length		Surface
Direction	ft	m	Surface
6/24	9,400	2,865	Asphalt
17/35	2,981	909	Turf/gravel

Statistics (2018)
- Aircraft operations (year ending 6/30/2018): 8,717
- Based aircraft: 30
- Source: Federal Aviation Administration

Gunnison–Crested Butte Regional Airport (IATA: GUC, ICAO: KGUC, FAA LID: GUC) is a county-owned, public airport one mile southwest of Gunnison, in Gunnison County, Colorado, United States. Also known as Gunnison County Airport, it serves the valley and nearby Crested Butte, Colorado, with airline and general aviation flights.

This airport is in the National Plan of Integrated Airport Systems for 2011–2015, which called it a primary commercial service airport (more than 10,000 enplanements per year). Federal Aviation Administration records say it had 36,035 passenger boardings (enplanements) in calendar year 2008, 42,130 in 2009 and 37,316 in 2010.

Passengers at Gunnison are mainly vacationers coming to the area for year-round outdoor activities, such as skiing, snowmobiling, snowshoeing, mountain biking, fishing, rafting, hiking and camping. The terminal is one large building with two jetbridge gates, two ground-level gates, and a variety of rental car or shuttle bus companies. One baggage claim area in the lower lobby level houses a single carousel and a dedicated ski/oversize baggage slide. The airport sees limited regional jet service during the summer months from Denver on United Express; however, seasonal service flown with mainline jetliners is operated during the winter months from other cities such as Dallas/Fort Worth and Houston.

It is at 38°32′02″N 106°55′59″W at an elevation of 7680 feet or 2341 meters above mean sea level. U.S. 50 runs along the northwest side of the airport. Its close location is due in part to redevelopment of land formerly occupied by the Denver & Rio Grande narrow gauge railroad and rail yards, abandoned in 1953. Currecanti Recreation Area and Blue Mesa Reservoir is located nine miles West of Gunnison. Also nearby is the Black Canyon of the Gunnison National Park, Taylor Reservoir, and Roaring Judy fish hatchery. Numerous ghost towns and scenic drives are located throughout the region as well.

In the months after the September 11 attacks, Gunnison–Crested Butte Regional Airport was one of several airports to have a temporary presence of the National Guard.

== Historical airline service ==
Monarch Airlines (1946-1950) was serving Gunnison by the late 1940s. Monarch was then merged with two other airlines to form the original Frontier Airlines (1950-1986) which in 1950 was operating Douglas DC-3 service on a round trip routing of Denver - Pueblo, CO - Canon City, CO/Florence, CO - Gunnison, CO - Montrose, CO - Grand Junction, CO several times a day. By 1967, Frontier was operating nonstop service to Denver and Montrose as well as direct one stop service to Grand Junction with Convair 580 turboprops. Two airlines were serving Gunnison in 1979: Frontier with nonstop service from Denver and Montrose, and Aspen Airways with nonstop service from Denver and Durango, CO with both air carriers operating Convair 580 turboprops. By 1981, Trans-Colorado Airlines was operating nonstop flights from Denver with Fairchild Swearingen Metroliner commuter propjets while Frontier was continuing to operate Convair 580 service nonstop from Denver and Montrose.

Seasonal mainline jetliner service had arrived at the airport by early 1985 with Air Atlanta operating Boeing 727-100 service nonstop from Atlanta (ATL) on Saturdays while at this same time Frontier was operating Boeing 737-200 service nonstop from both Dallas/Fort Worth (DFW) and Houston Hobby Airport (HOU) on Saturdays and Sundays with Trans-Colorado Airlines operating Metroliner commuter propjets nonstop from Denver, Durango and Montrose. American Airlines also began seasonal jetliner service in December 1985 from Dallas, Chicago and Houston, and grabbed a decided edge on its domestic competitors by signing a 10-year contract to provide expanded service between Chicago and Gunnison. Five airlines were serving Gunnison by late 1989 including American Airlines with daily Boeing 727-200 service nonstop from both Dallas/Fort Worth (DFW) and Chicago O'Hare Airport (ORD), Continental Airlines with nonstop Boeing 727-200 service from Houston Intercontinental Airport (IAH) on Saturdays, Continental Express operated by Rocky Mountain Airways on a code sharing basis on behalf of Continental with Beechcraft 1900C commuter propjets nonstop from Denver, Delta Air Lines with nonstop Boeing 727-200 service from Salt Lake City (SLC) on Saturdays, and United Express operated by Aspen Airways on a code sharing basis on behalf of United Airlines with nonstop Convair 580 turboprop service from Denver and Montrose. By the fall of 1991, Continental Express was flying de Havilland Canada DHC-7 Dash 7 turboprops nonstop from Denver and Montrose in addition to its Beechcraft 1900C service. According to the Official Airline Guide (OAG), four airlines were serving the airport in early 1995 including American with daily nonstop Boeing 757-200 service from Dallas/Fort Worth (DFW) with this flight also providing daily direct one stop service from Philadelphia (PHL), Continental Express operating on a code sharing basis on behalf of Continental with Beechcraft 1900C commuter propjets nonstop from Denver, Delta with nonstop Boeing 757-200 service from Atlanta (ATL) operated several days a week, and United Express operated by Mesa Airlines on a code sharing basis on behalf of United with nonstop Beechcraft 1900C service from Denver.

== Facilities and aircraft ==
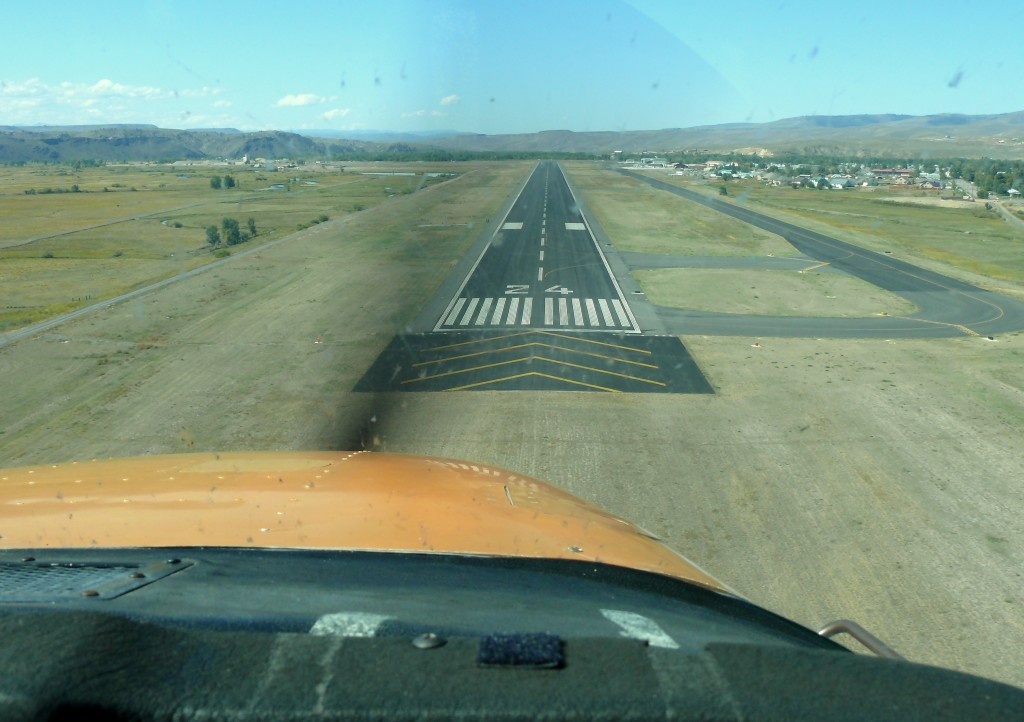
On short final landing on runway 24 at Gunnison airport

Gunnison–Crested Butte Regional Airport covers 1,600 acres (650 ha) and has two runways. The main runway, 6/24, has an asphalt pavement 9,400 by 150 ft (2,865 by 46 m) and is lighted during operational hours (0600-2230 MST). A second unpaved runway, 17/35, south of the main, is available to small aircraft in the summer; it has a turf and gravel surface 2,981 by 150 ft (909 by 46 m) and is unlighted and therefore open for daylight use only.

In the year ending June 30, 2018, the airport had 8,717 aircraft operations, average 24 per day: 80% general aviation, 9% air taxi, 6% scheduled commercial, and 5% military. 30 aircraft were then based at this airport: 23 single-engine 6 multi-engine, and 1 jet.

== Airlines and destinations ==
=== Passenger ===
Airlines	Destinations
American Airlines	Seasonal: Dallas/Fort Worth
JSX	Seasonal: Dallas–Love
United Express	Denver; Seasonal: Chicago–O'Hare, Houston–Intercontinental

== Statistics ==
=== Top destinations ===
Busiest domestic routes from GUC (June 2024 - May 2025)
Rank	Airport	Passengers	Carriers
1	Denver, Colorado	43,110	United
2	Dallas/Fort Worth, Texas	12,080	American
3	Houston–Intercontinental, Texas	5,880	United

== See also ==
- List of airports in Colorado
