= KLXV =

KLXV may refer to:

- The ICAO airport code for Lake County Airport (Colorado)
- KLXV (FM), a radio station (91.9 FM) licensed to Glenwood Springs, Colorado, United States
