= Rocky Mountain Airways =

Airline in the United States (1963–1991)

IATA	ICAO	Call sign
JC	RMA	ROCKY MOUNTAIN
- Founded: 1963; 63 years ago (as Vail Airways)
- Commenced operations: 1968; 58 years ago (as Rocky Mountain Airways)
- Ceased operations: 1991; 35 years ago (merged into Britt Airways)
- Operating bases: Stapleton International Airport
- Alliance: Continental Express
- Fleet size: See Fleet below
- Destinations: See Destinations below
- Parent company: Texas Air Corporation
- Headquarters: Hangar No. 6, Stapleton International Airport, Denver, Colorado, U.S.
- Key people: Gordon Autry

Rocky Mountain Airways was a commuter airline in the United States that operated from 1963 until it merged with Britt Airways in 1991. It was headquartered in Hangar No. 6 of the now-closed Stapleton International Airport in Denver, Colorado. It was sold to Texas Air Corporation/Continental Airlines in 1986 and was operated as a Continental Express subsidiary until its operations were merged with Britt Airways in 1991. The airline flew from Denver's Stapleton International Airport to a variety of destinations in Colorado, Nebraska and Wyoming. The airline operated out of the old commuter terminal in Concourse A at Stapleton.

== History ==
It was established as Vail Airways in 1963 by Gordon Autry. The airline adopted "Rocky Mountain Airways" in 1968, shortly after service to Aspen was introduced.

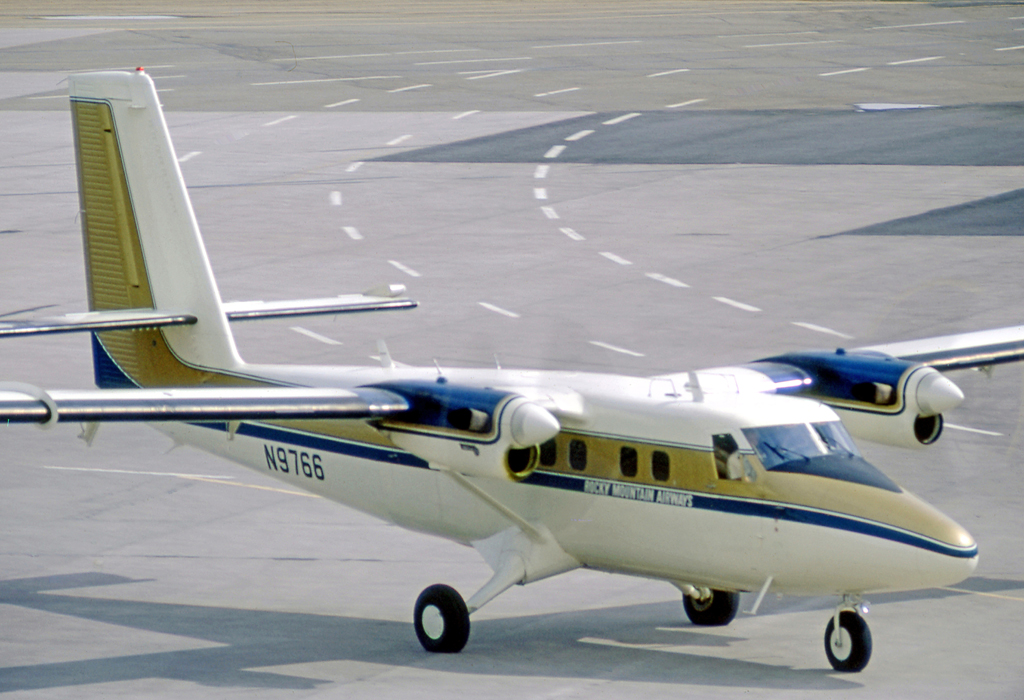
Rocky Mountain Airways de Havilland Canada DHC-6 Twin Otter operating a scheduled commuter flight at Denver's Stapleton International Airport in 1971

Vail Airways began operations with Cessna 310 piston twin aircraft, followed by the Rockwell Aero Commander piston twin. In 1969, Rocky Mountain Airways expanded with the 19 passenger de Havilland Canada DHC-6 Twin Otter twin engine turboprop. On February 3, 1978, Rocky Mountain Airways took delivery as the worldwide launch customer of the larger, 50 passenger de Havilland Canada Dash 7-102 four engine turboprop. In 1983, Rocky Mountain had placed an order for six 37-passenger de Havilland Canada DHC-8 Dash 8 twin turboprops, coincident with the type's service introduction; however, no Dash 8 aircraft were subsequently delivered to Rocky Mountain.

Both the DHC-6 Twin Otter and the DHC-7 Dash 7 featured short takeoff and landing (STOL) performance. This enabled Rocky Mountain Airways to serve destinations that otherwise would not have received scheduled passenger air service. One example was the Avon STOLport (WHR) located near the Vail ski resort which was served with the Dash 7. Another example was the Steamboat Springs Airport (KSBS or SBS) which was also served with the Dash 7. With a relatively short runway length of 4,452 feet and an airfield elevation of 6,882 feet, the Dash 7 was well suited for passenger operations from this small airport located near the Steamboat Springs ski resort. Rocky Mountain Airways also operated Twin Otter flights from Lake County Airport (LXV) in Leadville, Colorado. With an airfield elevation of 9,934 feet, Leadville is the highest airport ever to have received scheduled passenger air service in the U.S. Service was also provided to Grandby, CO, elevation 8160 ft., with Twin Otters during the 1970's. The Avon STOLport, which was a private airstrip controlled by the airline at Vail, no longer exists. Airline service to Vail is now provided via the Eagle County Airport, 35 miles to the west via Interstate 70. Steamboat Springs is now served by the Yampa Valley Airport, 25 miles to the west via U.S. 40. Leadville no longer has airline service.

Another primary route served by the airline was between Aspen-Pitkin County Airport and Denver. RMA flew the Twin Otter between the two destinations and then introduced Dash 7 service. The major competitor at the time in Aspen was Aspen Airways which flew Convair 440 piston engine prop aircraft which were subsequently replaced with Convair 580 turboprops. Aspen Airways then began operating British Aerospace BAe 146-100 jet aircraft on the route. Rocky Mountain and Aspen Airways competed for many years from Aspen. Currently, Aspen-Denver service is flown by SkyWest Airlines operating as United Express with Canadair CRJ-700 regional jets. In late 2024, SkyWest began replacing the CRJ-700's with Embraer 175 regional jets.

Upon its sale to Texas Air Corporation in 1986, Rocky Mountain Airways began serving as a Continental Express air carrier in order to provide passenger feed at the Continental Airlines hub operation at Denver Stapleton International Airport at the time. The Twin Otter and Dash 7 aircraft were painted in Continental Airlines distinctive white livery with orange, red, and gold striping and "Continental Express" titles. The Continental Express code sharing service at Denver was shared at first with Trans-Colorado Airlines and was then greatly expanded in 1987 when Trans-Colorado ceased operating at Denver. The Twin Otters were later retired and new ATR-42 and Beechcraft 1900C turboprop commuter airliners were acquired which became the standard aircraft for all Continental Express regional air carriers at the time. The Dash 7s were retained for their STOL ability to serve the Aspen airport and were also used to operate service into the Telluride Airport with its airfield elevation of 9,070 feet. All Rocky Mountain aircraft received the new blue and gold livery introduced by Continental in 1990. Rocky Mountain was merged with fellow Continental Express subsidiary Britt Airways in 1991.

== Destinations ==
Rocky Mountain Airways served the following destinations at various times during its existence:

- Colorado
  - Alamosa (ALS)
  - Aspen (Aspen–Pitkin County Airport) (ASE)
  - Colorado Springs (COS)
  - Cortez (CEZ)
  - Craig (CIG)
  - Denver Stapleton International Airport (now closed) - Hub and headquarters
  - Durango (DRO)
  - Fort Collins (FNL)
  - Granby (GNB)
  - Grand Junction (GJT)
  - Gunnison (GUC)
  - Leadville (LXV)
  - Montrose (MTJ)
  - Pueblo (PUB)
  - Steamboat Springs (Steamboat Springs Airport) (SBS)
  - Telluride (TEX)
  - Vail (Avon STOLport) (WHR) (now closed)
  - Vail/Eagle (Eagle County Airport) (EGE)
- Nebraska
  - Grand Island (GRI)
  - Lincoln (LNK)
  - North Platte (LBF)
  - Omaha (OMA)
  - Scottsbluff (BFF)
- New Mexico
  - Farmington (FMN)
- South Dakota
  - Pierre (PIR)
  - Rapid City (RAP)
- Texas
  - Amarillo (AMA)
  - Lubbock (LBB)
- Wyoming
  - Casper (CPR)
  - Cheyenne (CYS)
  - Cody (COD)
  - Gillette (GCC)
  - Jackson Hole (JAC)
  - Laramie (LAR)
  - Riverton (RIW)
  - Rock Springs (RKS)
  - Sheridan (SHR)

== Fleet ==
- Cessna 310 (operated by predecessor Vail Airways)
- de Havilland Canada DHC-6 Twin Otter
- de Havilland Canada DHC-7 Dash 7
- Rockwell Aero Commander (operated by predecessor Vail Airways)

Rocky Mountain Airways also operated ATR-42 and Beechcraft 1900C turboprops after becoming a Continental Express air carrier.

== Accidents ==
- December 4, 1978 – Rocky Mountain Airways Flight 217, a de Havilland Canada DHC-6 Twin Otter 300 (N25RM), crashed near Buffalo Pass;two of the twenty-two on board died. The crash was caused by severe icing combined with downdrafts associated with a mountain wave.

== See also ==
- List of defunct airlines of the United States
