= LXV =

LXV may refer to:

- 65 (number) in Roman numerals
- LXV, the IATA and FAA LID code for Lake County Airport, United States
