= Eagle County Regional Airport =

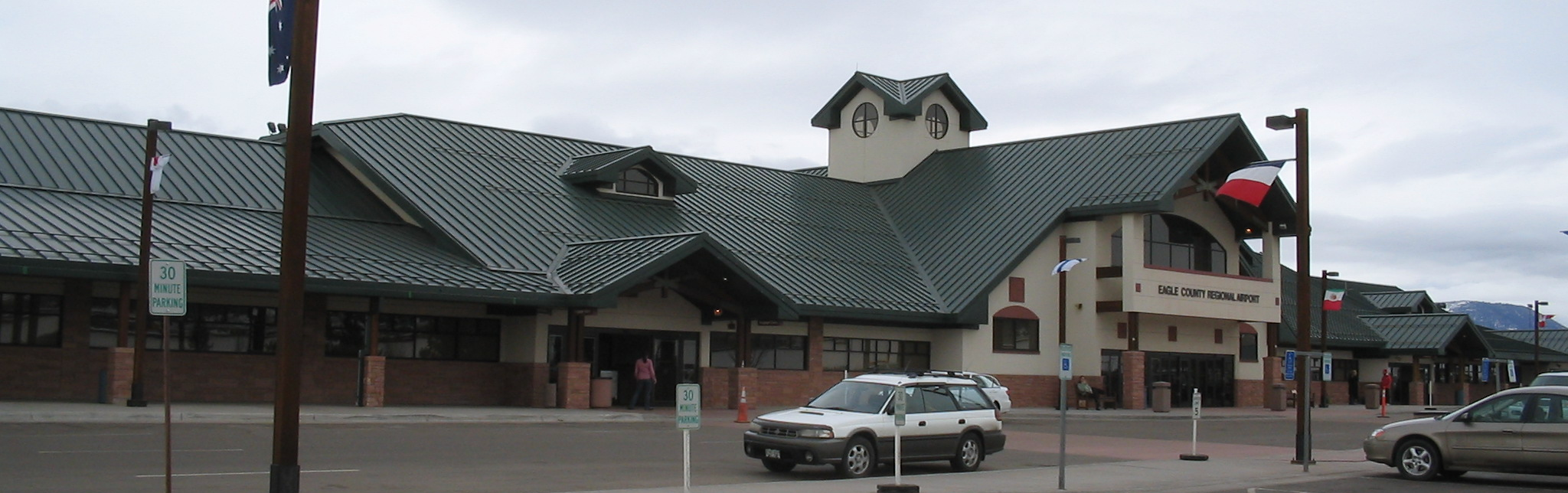
- IATA: EGE; ICAO: KEGE; FAA LID: EGE

Summary
- Airport type: Public
- Owner: Eagle County
- Serves: Vail and Eagle County, Colorado
- Location: Gypsum, Colorado
- Elevation AMSL: 6,547 ft (1,996 m)
- Coordinates: 39°38′33″N 106°55′04″W
- Website: flyege.com

Maps
- FAA diagram
- Interactive map of Eagle County Regional Airport

Runways
Direction	Length		Surface
Direction	ft	m	Surface
07/25	9,000	2,743	Asphalt

Statistics (2024)
- Total passengers: 563,000
- Aircraft operations: 58,040
- Based aircraft (2021): 89
- Source: Federal Aviation Administration, official site

Eagle County Regional Airport (IATA: EGE, ICAO: KEGE, FAA LID: EGE) is a public airport in Gypsum, Colorado, United States. The airport is also sometimes advertised as the Vail/Eagle Airport by airlines and other entities as it is located 4 miles (3.5 nmi; 6.4 km) from Eagle and 37 miles (32 nmi; 60 km) from Vail. It covers 632 acres (256 ha) and has one runway. It is the primary commercial airport for the Vail and Beaver Creek ski resorts, and, as a result, service is highly seasonal, with more flights in the winter than during the rest of the year.

The airport is also popular with private aviation services, and it hosts fixed-base operators and private jet charter operators.

== Terminal and facilities ==
EGE's terminal has one concourse with seven gates, built in 1996 and remodeled in 2001, 2007, and 2019. There are four TSA screening lanes, a pre-security concession/gift shop, and three luggage carousels, in addition to a special ski/snowboard slide. In 2012, a new inline baggage handling system was constructed in time for the 2012/13 ski season. Beyond the security checkpoint are a restaurant, coffee shop, gift shop, and bar. The airport also offers free wifi in the terminal. The airport has customs facilities for private aircraft located at the Vail Valley Jet Center.

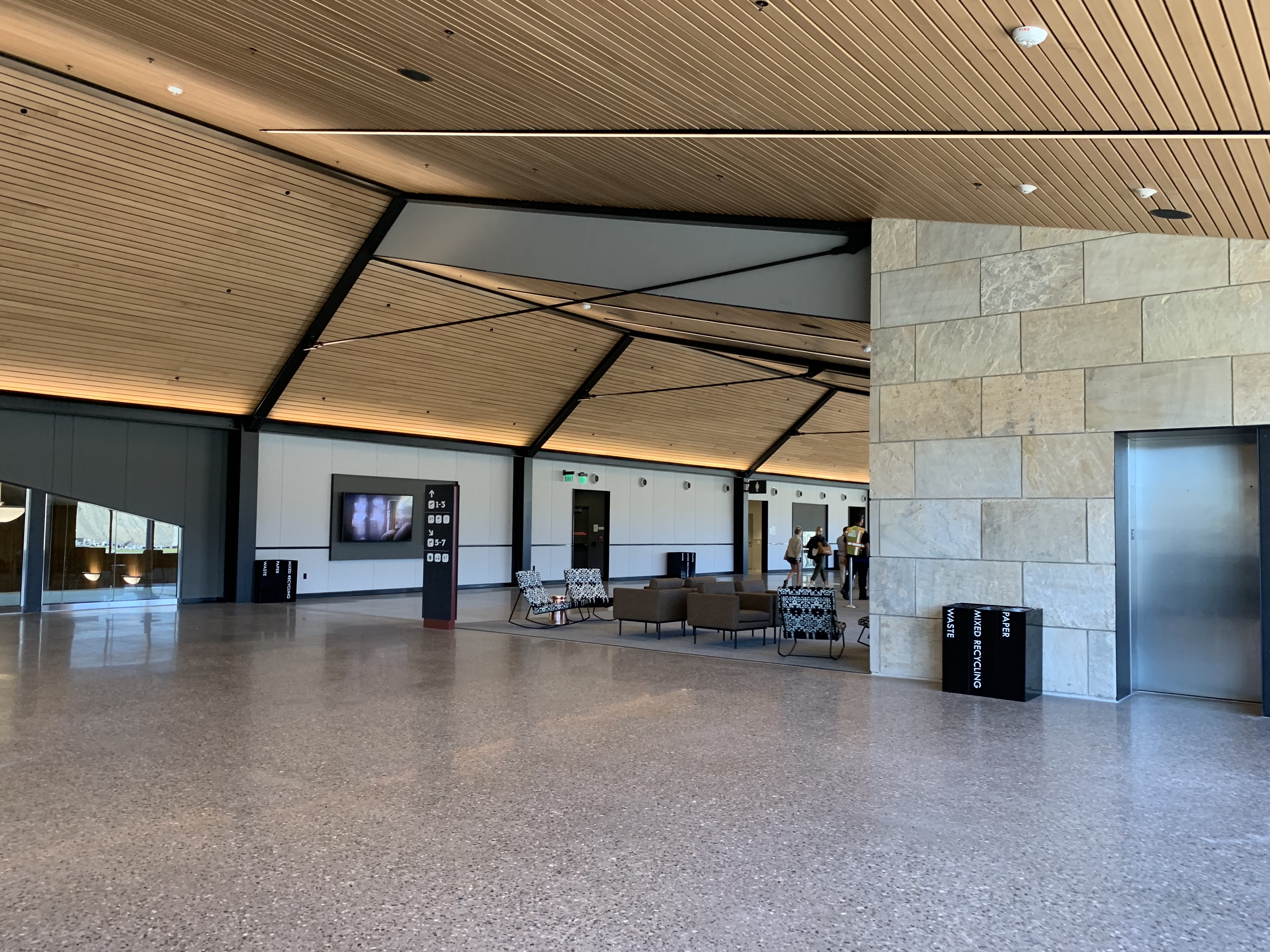
New terminal

The facility is in the midst of a terminal expansion project. On July 1, 2019, the first phase of this project opened, with access to the new terminal with four gates with jet bridges, enhanced concessions, and other new aviation technology. The final two ground-loading gates were expected to open in time for the 2019/2020 winter season. As of December 2019, the new TSA checkpoint is open, serving both TSA PreCheck and normal security lines.

== Operations ==
The Eagle County Sheriff provides airport security response. The airport has its own ARFF department with three fire trucks, including two state-of-the-art Oshkosh Striker trucks. The airport has a full complement of snowplows, snow blowers, and powered brooms for snow removal operations, along with a complete runway friction measuring system. The tower is staffed by SERCO contract air traffic controllers. In 2019, a dedicated de-icing pad was built on the South-East section of the airfield. This allows planes to be de-iced without blocking the commercial ramp and gates.

The airport’s long runway, measuring approximately 9,000 feet, is specifically designed to accommodate landings in challenging conditions. This length allows larger aircraft to land safely, even in reduced visibility or adverse weather. Combined with modern navigation aids and the expertise of air traffic controllers, Eagle County Regional Airport ensures reliable service, making it a vital gateway for travelers heading to nearby ski resorts like Vail and Beaver Creek.

== Aircraft procedures ==
There is no standard published ILS approach at the airport, but there is a special ILS approach, mostly used by the airlines, which requires permission and training from the FSDO. General aviation aircraft usually use the LDA approach, DME, or under VFR. The airport also has an on-site Beacon Interrogator (BI-6) Radar facility. IFR clearances are given by the Denver Air Route Traffic Control Center (ARTCC).

The History Channel rated Eagle County Regional Airport as #8 on its list of Most Extreme Airports in July 2010 due to the elevation, weather, approach through mountainous terrain and challenging departure procedures.

In 2008–09, the airport completed a runway repaving and extension project, increasing the runway length to 9,000 feet.

== Airline operations ==
United flies year-round to Denver on United Express (Skywest Airlines), and nonstop to Chicago–O'Hare in the summer and winter months. American offers near year-round service to Dallas/Fort Worth, operating as American Airlines or American Eagle in every season except fall. In winter, American, Delta, and United Airlines offer service to 11 more cities across the United States including daily flights to Atlanta, Los Angeles, Miami, New York–JFK, Newark, Houston–Intercontinental, and San Francisco, select Saturday flights to New York–LaGuardia and Philadelphia, and select holiday flights to Phoenix and Salt Lake City. On July 9, 2024, Alaska Airlines announced that it would commence nonstop service to Seattle/Tacoma and San Diego that December. Of the regional ski resort airports—excluding Denver and Salt Lake City—Eagle County Regional Airport has the second most regular flights during the winter, behind Aspen, CO, and ahead of Jackson Hole, WY.

Winter airline flights are operated via a variety of jet aircraft including the Boeing 757, Airbus A319 and Boeing 737 as well as Embraer 175 and Bombardier CRJ700 regional jets on shorter flights.

== Ground transportation ==
Eagle County Airport has several ground transportation options available for commuting to and from the airport. These include private car service providers, shared airport shuttle operators, taxi cabs, and rideshare services. Several car rental companies also operate at the airport.

== Airlines and destinations ==
Airlines	Destinations	Ref
Alaska Airlines	Seasonal: San Diego, Seattle/Tacoma	
American Airlines	Dallas/Fort Worth; Seasonal: Charlotte, Chicago–O'Hare, Miami, New York–JFK	
American Eagle	Seasonal: Los Angeles, Phoenix–Sky Harbor	
Delta Air Lines	Seasonal: Atlanta, New York–JFK	
Delta Connection	Seasonal: Los Angeles, Minneapolis/St. Paul	
United Airlines	Denver; Seasonal: Chicago–O'Hare, Houston–Intercontinental, Newark, Washington–Dulles	
United Express	Denver; Seasonal: Los Angeles, San Francisco	

== Early history ==
Louise Ellen Cooley bought a plot of land in 1911 that served as the foundation for building what would become Eagle County Regional Airport. The area became an attraction to local residents as barnstormers used the strip to perform aerial tricks and maneuvers.

Harry A. Nottingham (Eagle County Commissioner) was eager to see a fully functional airport for Eagle County. New plans for the airstrip were laid out in 1939 by an engineer from Denver's Airport District Office. Nottingham borrowed $20.00 for the development of a gravel road which would connect the air strip to the towns of Eagle and Gypsum Eagle County Airport was officially dedicated for service as a fully functioning airport on September 14, 1947.

=== Past air service ===
During the mid- and late 1970s, only one airline scheduled passenger service into the airport: Rocky Mountain Airways, which flew STOL capable de Havilland Canada DHC-6 Twin Otters followed by larger, 50-seat STOL capable de Havilland Canada DHC-7 Dash 7s nonstop from Denver Stapleton Airport and Aspen. In the late 1970s through the mid-1980s, Rocky Mountain Airways nonstops to Denver were all flown with the larger Dash 7. The April 1, 1987, Official Airline Guide (OAG) listed three airlines serving the airport: Rocky Mountain Airways operating as Continental Express for Continental Airlines via a code sharing agreement with Dash 7 flights from Denver, Royal West Airlines operating nonstop British Aerospace BAe 146-200 jets from Los Angeles (LAX) on Saturdays, and commuter air carrier Monarch Airlines operating Twin Otters from Aspen, Crested Butte, Grand Junction and Telluride. In August 1985 runway 8 at the airport was 5,000 ft in length by 60 ft in width with its west end located at 39.6452°N 106.92145°W; by December 1987, runway 7 had been added on its present alignment, 7,000 ft by 100 ft, with its LDA approach which then permitted operations with larger mainline jet aircraft with the current runway being 9,000 feet in length.

The airport was being served by mainline jets in early 1994: American Airlines Boeing 757-200s nonstop from Chicago O'Hare Airport, Dallas/Fort Worth, Miami, and New York La Guardia Airport; Delta Air Lines Boeing 727-200s from Salt Lake City; Northwest Airlines Boeing 757-200s from Minneapolis/St. Paul; and United Airlines Boeing 737-300s from Denver. The OAG lists 36 jet flights a week operated by these four airlines into the airport early in 1994. In 1995, TAESA Lineas Aereas, a Mexican airline, was operating nonstop jet service into the airport from Mexico City. Air Canada began flying an Airbus A319 nonstop from Toronto Pearson in 2013 by pre-clearing passengers in Toronto since the airport does not have custom facilities. Air Canada dropped the route after the 2017–2018 winter ski season due to relocating its A319s to other U.S. destinations.

== Statistics ==
=== Top destinations ===
Top domestic destinations from EGE (January 2025 – December 2025)
Rank	Airport	Passengers	Carriers
1	Denver, Colorado	98,820	United
2	Dallas/Fort Worth, Texas	94,590	American
3	Chicago–O'Hare, Illinois	26,530	American, United
4	Atlanta, Georgia	23,260	Delta
5	Miami, Florida	20,970	American
6	Houston–Intercontinental, Texas	14,910	United
7	Newark, New Jersey	11,670	United
8	New York–JFK, New York	10,010	American, Delta
9	Los Angeles, California	7,550	American, Delta, United
10	Phoenix, Arizona	4,730	American

Airlines by market share (January 2025 – December 2025)
Rank	Airline	Passengers	Market share
1	American Airlines	258,000	39.98%
2	United Airlines	217,000	33.69%
3	SkyWest Airlines	114,000	17.72%
4	Delta Air Lines	47,490	7.57%
5	Frontier Airlines	8,030	1.25%

=== Annual traffic ===
Traffic by calendar year
Year	Passenger boardings	Change over previous year	Year	Passenger boardings	Change over previous year	Year	Passenger boardings	Change over previous year
2000	184,562	—N/a	2010	201,010	▲10.65%	2020	143,000	▼25.00%
2001	165,639	▼10.25%	2011	189,276	▼5.84%	2021	206,536	▲37.8%
2002	169,762	▲2.49%	2012	167,914	▼11.29%	2022	220,326	▲2.49%
2003	168,347	▼6.7%	2013	167,166	▼0.45%	2023	232,215	▲5.4%
2004	194,173	▲15.34%	2014	165,004	▼1.29%	2024	289,867	▲24.8%
2005	213,233	▲9.82%	2015	156,937	▼4.89%			
2006	217,039	▲1.78%	2016	163,840	▲4.4%			
2007	231,719	▲6.8%	2017	154,577	▼5.65%			
2008	212,832	▼8.15%	2018	173,863	▲12.48%			
2009	181,666	▼14.64%	2019	194,905	▲10.80%			

== Accidents at or near EGE ==
On March 27, 1987, a Learjet 24 operated by Connie Kalitta Services impacted terrain 4.7 miles NW of EGE due to descending below the specified approach altitude. All three occupants (two pilots, one passenger) were killed.

== In popular culture ==
Eagle Vail Airport was featured on the History Channel's special, "Most Extreme Airports", as the world's 8th most extreme airport.

== See also ==
- List of airports in Colorado
