= Steamboat Springs Airport =

Airport in Colorado, United States

Steamboat Springs Airport Bob Adams Field
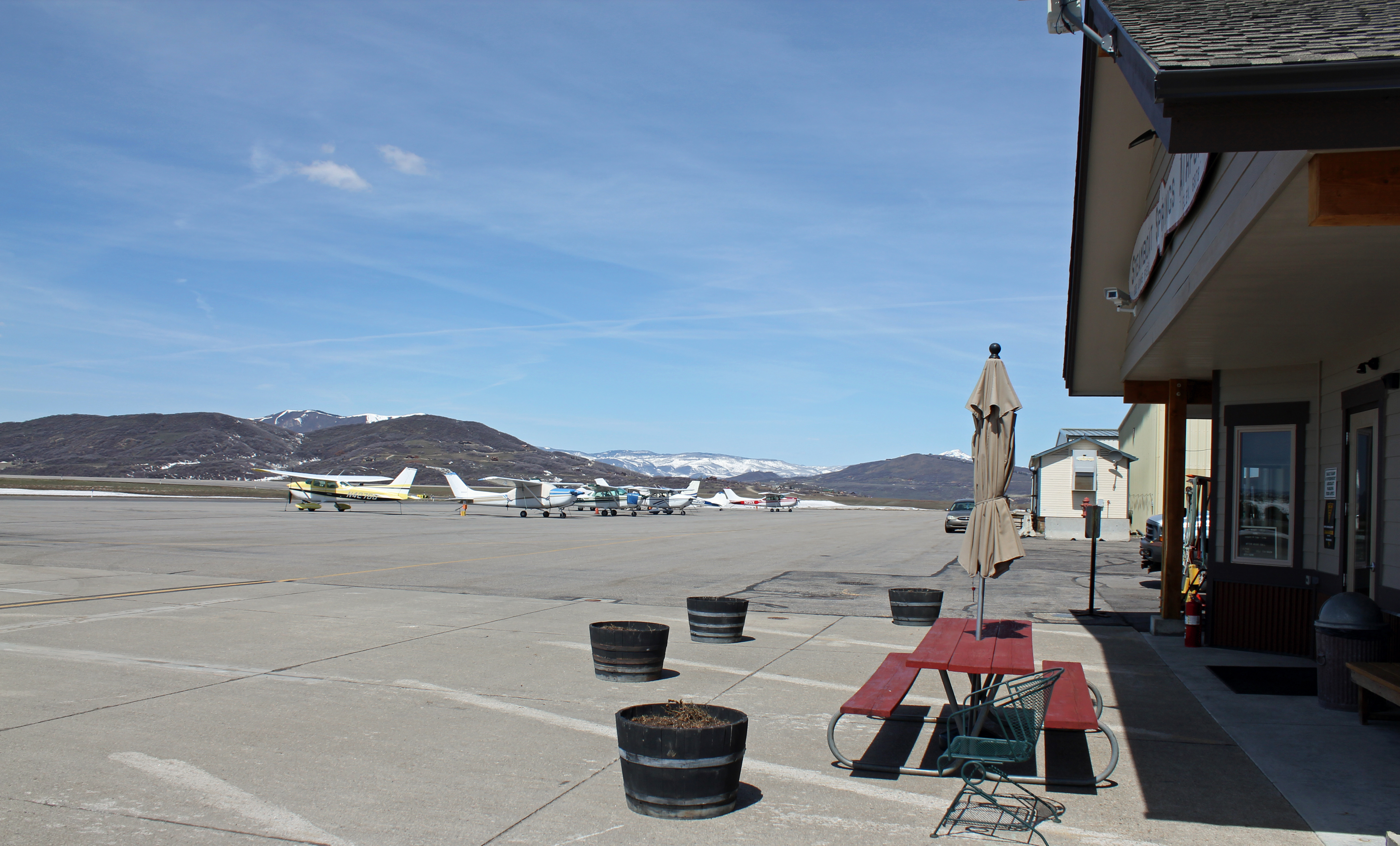
- The runway and associated buildings in 2014
- IATA: SBS; ICAO: KSBS; FAA LID: SBS

Summary
- Airport type: Public
- Owner: City of Steamboat Springs
- Serves: Steamboat Springs, Colorado
- Elevation AMSL: 6,882 ft / 2,098 m
- Coordinates: 40°30′58″N 106°51′59″W

Map
- Location in Colorado SBS (the United States)

Runways
Direction	Length		Surface
Direction	ft	m	Surface
14/32	4,452	1,357	Asphalt

Statistics (2008)
- Aircraft operations: 11,522
- Based aircraft: 82
- Source: Federal Aviation Administration

Steamboat Springs Airport (IATA: SBS, ICAO: KSBS, FAA LID: SBS) (Bob Adams Field) is a city-owned airport three miles northwest of Steamboat Springs, in Routt County, Colorado. The National Plan of Integrated Airport Systems for 2011–2015 categorized it as a general aviation facility.

Larger commercial jet aircraft by scheduled passenger airlines operates into the Yampa Valley Airport (HDN) 25 miles (40 km) west of Steamboat Springs near Hayden, Colorado which can handle Boeing 737 and 757 jetliners as well as Airbus A319 and A320 jets. Year-round service to Denver is provided at HDN by United Express and Southwest Airlines while multiple carriers with mainline jet flights operate to several major cities during the winter ski season.

== Historical airline service ==
According to the Official Airline Guide (OAG), Steamboat Springs Airport previously had scheduled passenger flights to Denver (DEN) operated by Rocky Mountain Airways with small de Havilland Canada DHC-6 Twin Otter aircraft during the mid 1970s followed by larger 50-passenger de Havilland Canada DHC-7 Dash 7s by the late 1970s. The twin engine Twin Otter turboprop as well as the four engine Dash 7 turboprop both feature short takeoff and landing (STOL) performance which was required due to Steamboat Springs' relatively short runway and high elevation. Rocky Mountain Airways later operated Dash 7 service into the airport on behalf of Continental Airlines via a code sharing agreement from 1986 through 1994 with up to ten flights a day to Denver. In 1997, Maverick Airways was operating Dash 7 service to Denver on behalf of the current version of Frontier Airlines via a code sharing agreement from January 1997 until their bankruptcy in May 1997. Since Maverick Airways shut down, the airfield has remained a general aviation airfield with no scheduled passenger airline service at the present time.

== Facilities ==
The airport covers 436 acres (176 ha) at an elevation of 6,882 feet (2,098 m). Its one runway, 14/32, is 4,452 by 100 feet (1,357 x 30 m) asphalt.

In 2008, the airport had 11,522 aircraft operations, average 31 per day: 95% general aviation and 5% air taxi. 82 aircraft were then based at this airport: 82% single-engine, 9% multi-engine, 2% jet, 6% helicopter, and 1% glider.

There is a small terminal for private aviation and several hangars on the property. There are about 30 spots for aircraft on the apron.

The Civil Air Patrol has an office and aircraft at the airport. The Steamboat Springs Police Department provide security for the airport, while the Steamboat Springs Fire Department provides firefighting and emergency medical services. There are no Aircraft Rescue and Firefighting (ARFF) trucks at the airport. Snow removal equipment is operated by the airport operations department.

Steamboat has two non-precision instrument approach procedures; a RNAV(GPS)-E and a VOR/DME-C. The RNAV is the preferred approach with 1300/1 & 1/2 ceiling/vis requirements and both approaches are cat A/B only. HDN, 16NM to the west has an ILS approach with a 10,000ft runway.

There is no air traffic control tower. Aircraft communicate on a Common Traffic Advisory Frequency (CTAF). The airport warns pilots about the high volume of wildlife that wander on airport property. Snow removal operations happen between 6:00am and 6:00pm during the winter season. The airport is closed when there is snow removal equipment on the runway.

== See also ==
- List of airports in Colorado
