= Aspen Airways =

Small US airline (1952-1991)

IATA	ICAO	Call sign
AP	ASP	ASPEN AIR
- Founded: 1952; 74 years ago
- Ceased operations: 1991; 35 years ago
- Operating bases: Denver–Stapleton
- Headquarters: Denver, Colorado, U.S.
- Key people: Walter Paepcke (Founder); Bill Ringsby (Owner)

Aspen Airways (IATA: AP, ICAO: ASP, call sign: Aspen Air) was an airline carrier and regional affiliate of United Express and based in Hangar 5 in Stapleton International Airport in Denver, Colorado. Aspen ceased operations on April 1, 1990, when separate portions of the airline were acquired by Mesa Airlines and Air Wisconsin Services, Inc.

== History ==
Aspen Airways was named after the aspen tree and not the town of Aspen, Colorado, where it was originally based before moving its headquarters to Stapleton International Airport (DEN) in Denver.

Aspen Airways was founded in 1952 by Walter Paepcke, as the flight department of the Aspen Institute of Humanistic Studies. It was created to fly personnel between Aspen (ASE) and Denver (DEN). The airline's first aircraft were surplus Douglas DC-3s.

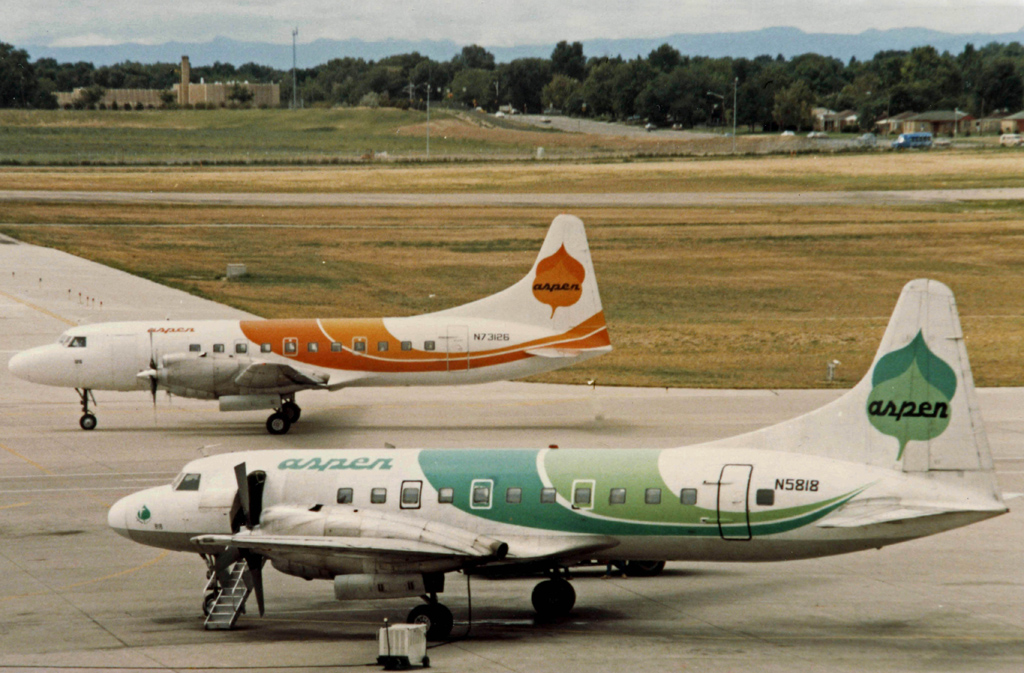
Two Convair 580s of Aspen Airways wearing variations on the company color scheme at Denver Stapleton in 1986

Prior to 1967, Aspen Airways was an “air taxi”, an airline operating aircraft less than 12,500lbs in maximum weight, and therefore escaped regulation by the Civil Aeronautics Board (CAB), a now defunct Federal agency that then tightly regulated almost all US air transport. In 1962, the CAB provided Aspen with an exemption to allow it to operate one aircraft larger than 12,500lbs between Aspen and Denver. Aspen Airways was not immediately able to take advantage of this due to airport limitations in Aspen. The exemption was extended until in 1967, the CAB certificated Aspen Airways to fly the Aspen-Denver route, the first domestic airline certificated since the local service carriers were certificated in the late 1940s/early 1950s. From then on, until US airline deregulation in 1978, Aspen Airways was under the same regulatory regime as any other US carrier flying large aircraft, like American Airlines or United.

In 1963, Aspen Airways was purchased by J.W. "Bill" Ringsby. During the late 1960s, Aspen operated a Convair 240 prop aircraft leased from Alaska Airlines and by 1970 was operating four Convair 340/Convair 440 prop airliners which were purchased used from Delta Air Lines. In the early 1970s, Aspen began operating Convair 580 turboprop aircraft. The twin engine CV-580 propjet became the workhorse of the Aspen fleet. Other aircraft operated by Aspen Airways in the 1960s included a Fairchild F-27 turboprop (which didn't work out very well in the high density altitude conditions that can occur at high elevation mountain airfields), and piston and turboprop variants of the de Havilland Heron as well as Piper Navajo and Aero Commander 500B aircraft.

A major competitor on the Aspen-Denver route for many years was Rocky Mountain Airways (RMA) which operated de Havilland Canada DHC-6 Twin Otter turboprops. RMA then introduced new de Havilland Canada DHC-7 Dash 7 four engine turboprop aircraft that were configured with 50 passenger seats.

During the early 1980s, Aspen Airways expanded by providing scheduled passenger airline within California including service at Lake Tahoe Airport (TVL) located in the Sierra Nevada Mountains. Convair 580 turboprops were flown on nonstop services to Burbank (BUR), Los Angeles (LAX), San Francisco (SFO) and San Jose (SJC) in California. At the same time, Aspen was also operating Convair 580 service between Los Angeles and Bakersfield (BFL). The airline even offered Convair 580 flights on the very short hop between Los Angeles International Airport and Burbank Airport as an extension of the Lake Tahoe service. The front cover of the September 1, 1980, system timetable for Aspen Airways had the message: "Specializing in service to.....Lake Tahoe, California & Aspen/Snowmass, Colorado." Essential Air Service (EAS) was operated between San Francisco and Modesto (MOD) and Stockton (SCK), California in 1982.

Aspen Airways Financial Results, 1973 thru 1978
USD 000	1973	1974	1975	1976	1977	1978
Op revenue	2,329	2,733	3,901	5,103	6,436	7,767
Op profit (loss)	327	212	607	489	222	(698)
Net profit (loss)	291	45	269	171	11	(21)
Op margin	14.0%	7.8%	15.6%	9.6%	3.4%	-9.0%
Net margin	12.5%	1.6%	6.9%	3.4%	0.2%	-0.3%

In 1985, Aspen Airways acquired new British Aerospace BAe 146-100 four engine jetliners which featured quiet technology with regard to engine noise as well as short takeoff and landing performance and began operating the first commercial jet airliner service into Aspen. It also inaugurated BAe 146 jet service from Denver to Amarillo (AMA) and Lubbock (LBB), from Denver to Farmington (FMN) and Durango (DRO), and from Denver to Gillette (GCC) and Sheridan (SHR). The BAe 146-100 is the smallest member of the British Aerospace 146 family of jetliners, many of which currently remain in operation in Europe as well as other parts of the world although not in the U.S. except in aerial fire fighting roles as converted air tankers.

In September 1986, Aspen Airways became a United Express affiliate carrier, providing passenger feed to and from the United Airlines hub in Denver (DEN). By 1986, Aspen Airways was providing seasonal BAe 146 jet service from Aspen nonstop to Dallas/Ft Worth (DFW), Los Angeles (LAX), San Francisco (SFO), Houston (IAH), Chicago (ORD) and Long Beach (LGB).

Service from Denver also included flights to Colorado Springs, Durango, Gunnison, Hayden, Montrose, and Rifle in Colorado as well as to Farmington, and Albuquerque, New Mexico, Sioux City and Waterloo, Iowa, and Cheyenne, Sheridan and Gillette in Wyoming. The airline also operated nonstop service at one point between Salt Lake City (SLC) and Aspen, Jackson Hole, Wyoming (JAC), and West Yellowstone, Montana (WYS).

In 1989, Aspen offered itself up for sale. Several suitors attempted to purchase the airline. Its employees attempted to acquire the airline, but were unable to come up with the capital. Next, the Giant Group, a conglomeration of cement and recycling companies, offered to purchase the airline, but their offer fell through. In the end, Mesa Airlines acquired Aspen's Denver hub and routes except for the Denver to Aspen route, stations and ground equipment. Air Wisconsin Services Inc., the parent company for Air Wisconsin, acquired all of Aspen's common stock, its Aspen routes, and its BAe 146 and Convair 580 aircraft. In April 1995 during the late ski season, Air Wisconsin was operating shuttle service as United Express with BAe 146 jets on the former Aspen Airways route between Aspen and Denver with no less than fourteen (14) daily nonstop flights in each direction.

Air Wisconsin Services continued to operate Aspen Airways as a wholly owned subsidiary separate from its Air Wisconsin airline from 1990 until April 3, 1991, when it merged the two airlines together. And the nearly 40 year legacy of the airline that pioneered service from Aspen, Colorado, came to an end.

== Final Fleet & Replacement Air Service at Aspen ==
At the time of the separate sale and merger, Aspen Airways operated four BAe 146 jets and ten Convair 580 turboprops. The Convair 580 turboprops were parked and eventually sold while Air Wisconsin continued to fly the BAe 146 jet aircraft as this regional carrier already operated the BAe 146 in their fleet.

== Destinations ==
Aspen Airways served the following destinations as an independent airline or as a United Express air carrier at various different times during its existence. Not all of these destinations were served at the same time. Destination information is taken from Aspen Airways system timetables dated March 1, 1979, June 12, 1982, December 17, 1983, April 1, 1985 and July 21, 1986, and also from the December 15, 1989, edition of the Official Airline Guide (OAG).

- Albuquerque, NM (ABQ)
- Amarillo, TX (AMA)
- Aspen, CO (ASE) - focus destination, principally for United Express service to United Airlines hubs and other cities served by United
- Bakersfield, CA (BFL)
- Billings, MT (BIL)
- Burbank, CA (BUR)
- Casper, WY (CPR)
- Cheyenne, WY (CYS)
- Cody, WY (COD)
- Colorado Springs, CO (COS)
- Denver, CO (DEN) - (now closed): Hub and headquarters for the airline
- Durango, CO (DRO)
- Farmington, NM (FMN)
- Gillette, WY (GCC)
- Grand Forks, ND (GFK)
- Grand Junction, CO (GJT)
- Gunnison, CO (GUC)
- Hayden, CO (HDN)
- Jackson Hole, WY (JAC)
- Lake Tahoe, CA (TVL)
- Laramie, WY (LAR)
- Los Angeles, CA (LAX)
- Lubbock, TX (LBB)
- Midland/Odessa, TX (MAF)
- Modesto, CA (MOD)
- Montrose, CO (MTJ)
- Rapid City, SD (RAP)
- Rifle, CO (RIL)
- Salt Lake City, UT (SLC)
- San Francisco, CA (SFO)
- San Jose, CA (SJC)
- Sheridan, WY (SHR)
- Sioux City, IA (SUX)
- Stockton, CA (SCK)
- Waterloo, IA (ALO)
- West Yellowstone, MT (WYS)

Aspen Airways also flew British Aerospace BAe 146 jet service between Aspen (ASE) and the following destinations operating as United Express on behalf of United Airlines via a code sharing agreement:

- Chicago, IL (ORD)
- Denver, CO (DEN)
- Dallas/Fort Worth, TX (DFW)
- Houston, TX (IAH)
- Long Beach, CA (LGB)
- Los Angeles, CA (LAX)
- San Francisco, CA (SFO)

== Fleet ==
Aspen Airways operated the following aircraft during its existence:

- Aero Commander 500B
- British Aerospace BAe 146-100 (only jet aircraft type operated by the airline)
- Convair 240
- Convair 340
- Convair 440
- Convair 580
- de Havilland Heron
- Douglas DC-3
- Fairchild F-27
- Piper Navajo

At the time of its acquisition and merger, Aspen was operating BAe 146 jet and Convair 580 turboprop aircraft.

== See also ==
- List of defunct airlines of the United States
