= MULTICOM =

VHF radio frequency used as a Common Traffic Advisory Frequency

In U.S. and Canadian aviation, MULTICOM is a frequency allocation used as a Common Traffic Advisory Frequency (CTAF) by aircraft near airports where no air traffic control is available. Despite the use of uppercase letters, MULTICOM is not an abbreviation or acronym.

Frequency allocations vary from region to region.

United States
there is one MULTICOM frequency: 122.9 MHz. (See AIM table 4-1-2 or AIM table 4–1–1) At uncontrolled airports without a UNICOM, pilots are to self-announce on the MULTICOM frequency.
Australia
there is one MULTICOM frequency: 126.7 MHz.
Brazil
there is one MULTICOM frequency: 123.45 MHz.

== See also ==
- UNICOM
- CTAF
