= 2001 Avjet Gulfstream III crash =

2001 aviation accident in Colorado

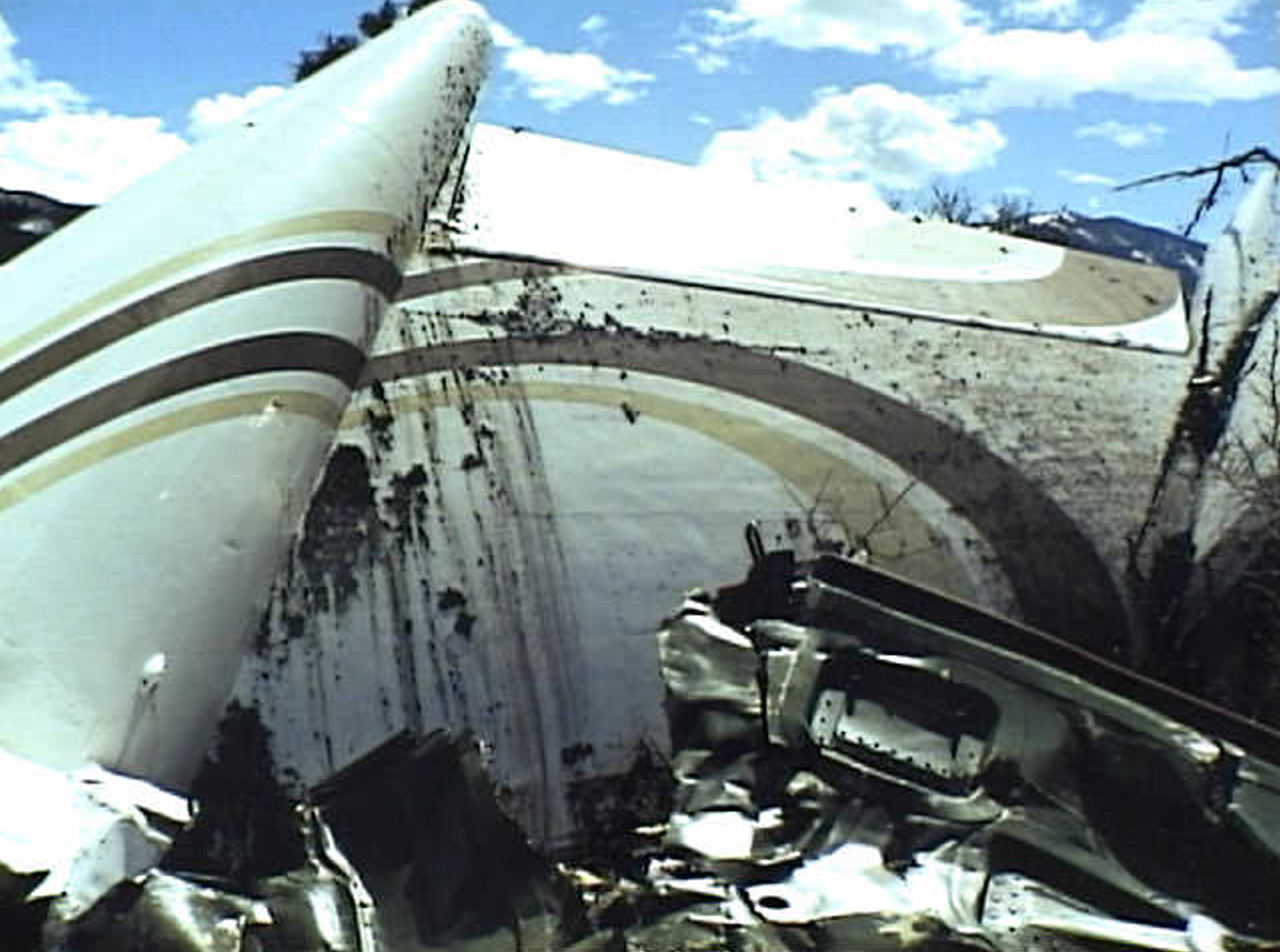
- Wreckage of the tail section

Accident
- Date: 29 March 2001
- Summary: Controlled flight into terrain due to pilot error
- Site: Pitkin County, near Aspen/Pitkin County Airport, Aspen, Colorado, US; 39°14′8.75″N 106°52′35.57″W

Aircraft
- N303GA, the aircraft involved in the accident
- Aircraft type: Gulfstream III
- Operator: Avjet Corporation
- Registration: N303GA
- Flight origin: Los Angeles International Airport, California
- Destination: Aspen/Pitkin County Airport, Colorado
- Occupants: 18
- Passengers: 15
- Crew: 3
- Fatalities: 18
- Survivors: 0

On March 29, 2001, a chartered Gulfstream III business jet operated by Avjet from Los Angeles, California, to Aspen, Colorado, crashed into the ground while on final approach. All three crew members and 15 passengers on board died.

The subsequent investigation by the National Transportation Safety Board (NTSB) concluded that the cause of the accident was the captain's premature descent below the minimum descent altitude, carried out without having the runway in sight.

The accident's investigation also brought into focus several generic safety issues, such as: pressure applied on charter pilots by customers, including this flight's charter customer having contacted the Avjet office to state that the flight must not be diverted, and telling Avjet management that the pilot must stop talking about diversion being required due to the night landing rules at Aspen; night flight into airports near mountainous terrain; and, the ambiguity of some Federal Aviation Administration rules.

== Flight history ==
Captain Robert Frisbie (44) and First Officer Peter Kowalczyk (38) reported for work at Avjet's Burbank, California, facility around noon on the day of the accident. After checking the weather and the aircraft, they embarked on an 11-minute repositioning flight to Los Angeles International Airport (LAX) to pick up their passengers. The flight was originally scheduled to leave LAX at 16:30 MST, but departed after a 41-minute delay for two late passengers – including the charter customer, Robert New – at 17:11 MST.

Earlier in the day, an FAA specialist had informed the crew that it would be illegal to land at night in Aspen under instrument flight rules. In addition, the crew were aware that due to noise abatement restrictions, their jet aircraft was required to land at Aspen by the 18:58 MST night curfew. Following the delayed departure from LAX, their estimated arrival time was 18:46 MST, twelve minutes before the curfew took effect.

As the flight approached Aspen/Pitkin County Airport, it became evident that some of the other inbound flights were performing missed approaches, as they had been unable to complete an instrument approach to the airport's runway. The airport is surrounded by high terrain on all sides and a fairly steep descent is required in order to land.

At 18:56:06 MST, the flight was cleared for the VOR/DME-C instrument approach to the airport, whereupon it proceeded to the Red Table VOR, executed a sequence of designated step-down maneuvers and began final approach to the runway. As it continued its descent past the missed approach point – where the runway must be in sight to continue – the pilots had still not visually located the runway in the increasing darkness and snow showers. At 19:01:57 MST, while in a steep left bank, the aircraft crashed into the terrain, killing all 18 people on board.

== Investigation and final report ==
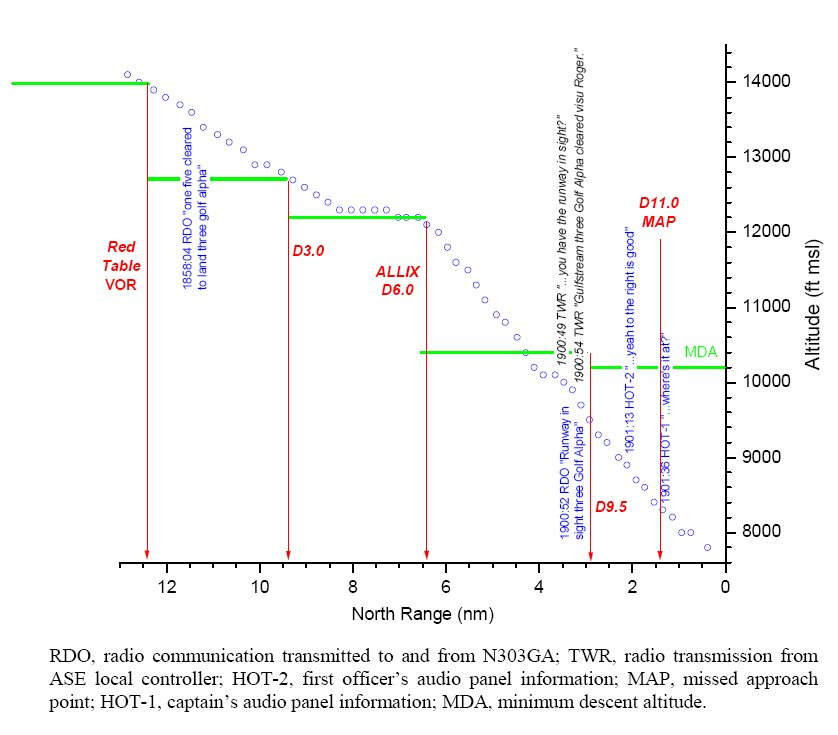
Profile view of N303GA's approach to Aspen (NTSB report).

Following the crash, the aircraft's cockpit voice recorder was recovered from the wreckage and the data recorded found to be intact and usable. Under Code of Federal Regulations (CFR) Part 135 Air Taxi rules, no flight data recorder was required for this type of flight and one had not been installed.

Part of the subsequent NTSB investigation focused on the fact that the instrument approach at the destination airport was not legal for night landing, and the overall pressure applied on the charter company and flight crew by the charter customer to complete the flight into the original destination. According to witnesses, the charter customer, Robert New, upon learning that the flight might have to be diverted to an alternate airport due to the night landing restriction, had his business assistant call Avjet management, to "let them know that the airplane was not going to be redirected". New was the owner of Prestige car rental company.

In addition, witnesses claimed that when the charter customer learned that the captain had discussed the possible diversion with some of the passengers waiting for the late arrivals, he had his assistant call Avjet to instruct the captain to "keep his comments to himself".

The Avjet charter department scheduler subsequently testified that New had told the captain why he must push forward to Aspen, as "the captain felt that it was important to land at [Aspen] because of the substantial amount of money that the [charter] customer spent for a dinner party".

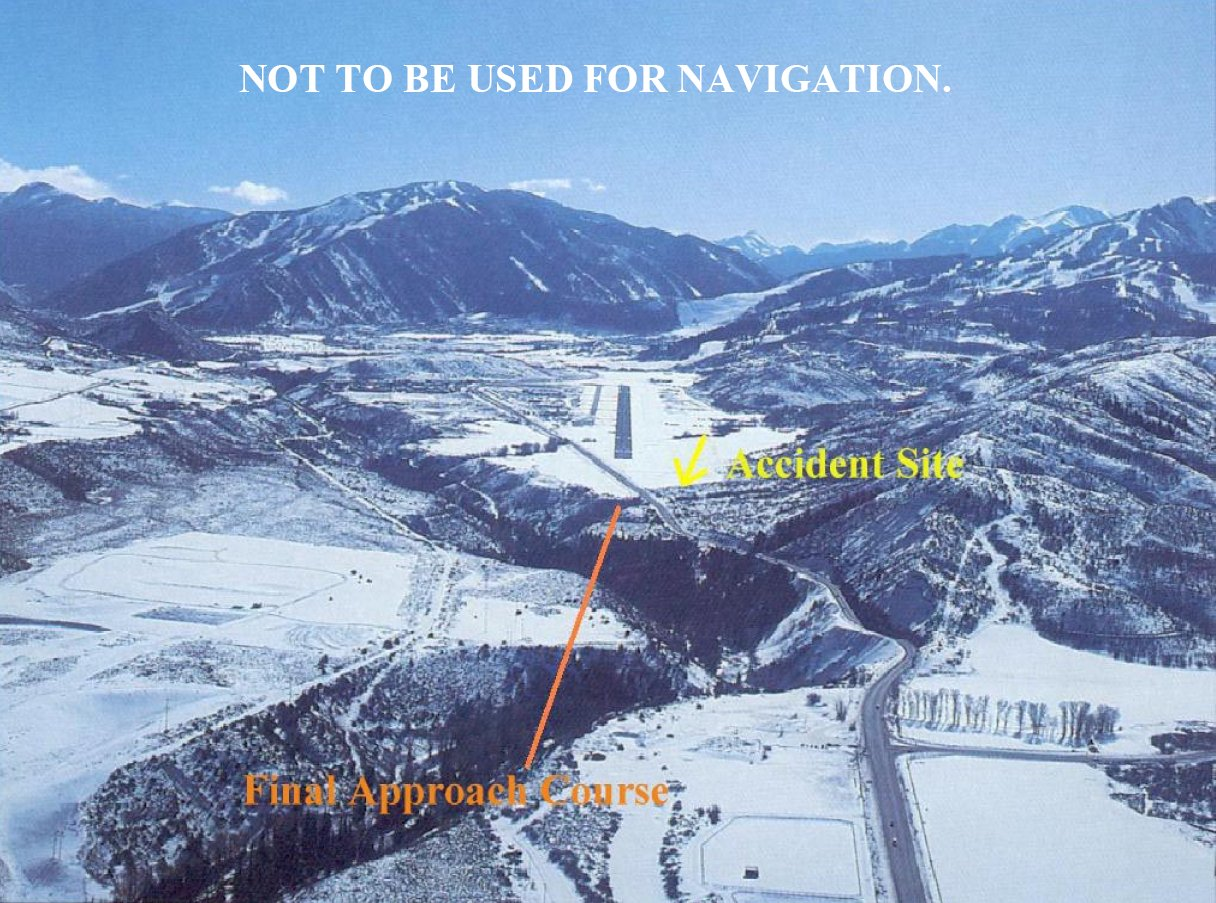
A daytime fair weather view of the approach to runway 15 at Aspen airport, depicting accident site of N303GA (NTSB report).

Based on information obtained from the cockpit voice recorder, an unidentified male passenger had pressured the flight attendant to escort him to the flight deck's jump seat during the approach sequence. According to the NTSB's analysis, "the presence of this passenger in the cockpit, especially if it were the charter customer, most likely further heightened the pressure on the flight crew to land at [Aspen]".

The NTSB issued its final report on June 11, 2002, with the following probable cause:

The National Transportation Safety Board determines that the probable cause of this accident was the flight crew's operation of the airplane below the minimum descent altitude without an appropriate visual reference for the runway.

The NTSB added the following contributing factors:

Contributing to the cause of the accident were the Federal Aviation Administration's (FAA) unclear wording of the March 27, 2001 Notice to Airmen regarding the nighttime restriction for the VOR/DME-C approach to the airport and the FAA's failure to communicate this restriction to the Aspen tower; the inability of the flight crew to adequately see the mountainous terrain because of the darkness and the weather conditions; and the pressure on the captain to land from the charter customer and because of the airplane's delayed departure and the airport's nighttime landing restriction.

== Aftermath ==
After the accident, Avjet decided to prohibit airport operations at Aspen and three other mountainous airports between sunset and sunrise. It also issued the following memorandum to its flight crews and schedulers:

if you cannot accomplish a landing and be on the ground at one of these airports before sunset you must divert to a suitable alternate. All passengers for one of these destinations must be informed of this policy. Flight crew members must report any violation of this policy or pressure from passengers to violate this policy to the Director of Operations or Chief Pilot.

Avjet also added the following policy to its operations manual after the accident:

Only an Avjet assigned crewmember, check airman, or FAA observer may occupy the observer's seat (jump seat) in any Avjet aircraft. Charter passengers shall never be allowed to occupy the observer's seat at any time.

== Litigation ==
A wrongful death lawsuit was filed by the families of three of the victims in Los Angeles. After a jury found the captain and Avjet Corporation negligent, an out-of-court settlement was reached in July 2003, where Avjet agreed to pay the plaintiffs a total of US$11.7 million (equivalent to $19.6 million in 2025) in damages. There were reportedly also other settlements for other victims.

== In popular culture ==
The crash was featured in season 26, episode 1 of the Canadian documentary series Mayday, also known as Air Crash Investigation, titled "Deadly Charter".
