= UNICOM =

Air-ground communication facility

A UNICOM (universal communications) station is an air-ground communication facility operated by a non-air traffic control private agency to provide advisory service at uncontrolled aerodromes and airports and to provide various non-flight services, such as requesting a taxi, even at towered airports. It is also known as an aeronautical advisory station, with these terms being used mostly in the Americas. The equivalent European/ICAO service is known as (aerodrome) flight information service, abbreviated as AFIS or FIS. From an ICAO perspective, UNICOM, historically most commonly provided by flight service stations, is an implementation of FIS.

== Description ==
UNICOM is employed at airports with a low volume of general aviation traffic and where no control tower is active. UNICOM stations typically use a single communications frequency. Some airfields always offer UNICOM service while others revert to UNICOM procedures only during hours when the control tower is closed. Under this protocol, aircraft may call a non-government ground station to make announcements of their intentions. Pilots who join the frequency later can request field advisories, which may include "weather information, wind direction, the recommended runway" and any previously reported traffic.

In some cases, the ground station is not staffed, and attempts to communicate will, of course, receive no acknowledgement. During these times, pilots self-announce their position and/or intentions over the CTAF frequency, which is often the same as the UNICOM frequency. When a part-time UNICOM station is located on the same airport as a part-time control tower, the same frequency will be used by both ground stations to avoid confusion. Many UNICOM stations are nowadays operated by a fixed-base operator (FBO), and it may be possible to request services such as fuel trucks, taxi service from the airport, outgoing phone calls, and others.

== Frequencies ==
The actual frequency used at any particular airport can be found on the relevant sectional, terminal area chart or in airport directories, such as the Canada Flight Supplement.

=== United States ===
In the United States, radio frequencies made available by the Federal Communications Commission for use as UNICOM are:

Airports with an Air Traffic Control tower or FSS (Alaska only) on the airport.

- 122.950 MHz

Airports without an Air Traffic Control tower or FSS on the airport.

- 122.700 MHz
- 122.725 MHz
- 122.800 MHz
- 122.975 MHz
- 123.000 MHz
- 123.050 MHz
- 123.075 MHz

=== Canada ===
In Canada, the radio frequencies assigned for UNICOM are:

- 122.700 MHz
- 122.725 MHz
- 122.750 MHz
- 122.775 MHz
- 122.800 MHz
- 122.825 MHz
- 122.950 MHz
- 123.000 MHz
- 123.300 MHz
- 123.350 MHz
- 123.500 MHz

== See also ==
- CTAF
- MULTICOM
