= Common traffic advisory frequency =

VHF radio frequency used in air-to-air communication

Common traffic advisory frequency (CTAF) is the name given to the VHF radio frequency used for air-to-air communication at United States and Australian non-towered airports.

Many towered airports close their towers overnight, keeping the airport open for cargo operations and other activity. Pilots use the tower frequency to coordinate their arrivals and departures safely, giving position reports and acknowledging other aircraft in the airfield traffic pattern.

In many locations, smaller airports use pilot-controlled lighting systems when it is uneconomical or inconvenient to have automated systems or staff to turn on the taxiway and runway lights. In Canada, the lighting system is accessed through an aircraft radio control of aerodrome lighting (ARCAL) frequency, which is often shared with the CTAF.

Two common CTAF allocations are UNICOM and MULTICOM. UNICOM is a licensed non-government base station that provides air-to-ground and ground-to-air communication, and may also serve as a CTAF when in operation. MULTICOM is a frequency allocation without a physical base station that is reserved as a CTAF for airports without other facilities.

== Australia ==
In Australia, there are many landing strips in remote locations that have CTAF operations 24 hours a day, seven days a week. There are also CTAF(R) landing strips which require the aircraft intending to enter the area of operation to be fitted with a radio. The most common CTAF frequency is 126.7 MHz at non-towered aerodromes, except for when two CTAF airports are near each other. Aerodromes using CTAF outside tower hours typically nominate a frequency that is used during tower hours.

== United States ==
UNICOM and a CTAF may be mutually exclusive, but this is not always the case. In the United States, many non-towered airports use the same frequency for both UNICOM and CTAF purposes. Pilots are advised to check their sectional charts and/or Chart Supplement (formerly Airport/Facilities Directory) to determine the appropriate frequency for CTAF prior to operating at any given airport.

== United Kingdom ==
Unlicensed aerodromes in the United Kingdom often recommend pilots communicate with each other using SAFETYCOM, currently 135.480 MHz. However, most gliding clubs use the Glider Ground Station Common Field Frequency, currently 129.975 MHz.

== See also ==
- Acronyms and abbreviations in avionics
