= Lake County Airport (Colorado) =

Public-use airport near Leadville, Colorado, US

Lake County Airport Leadville Airport
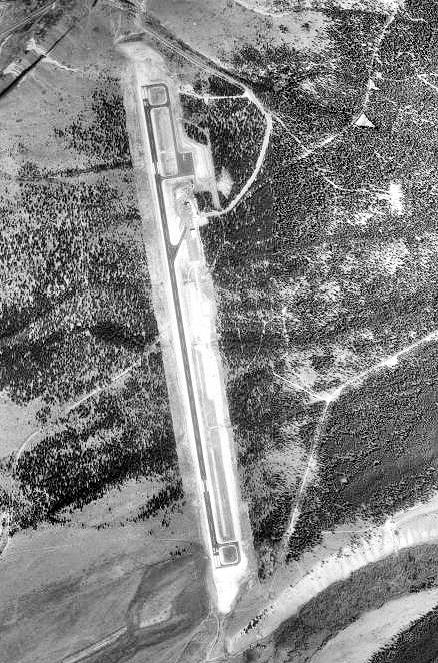
- USGS aerial image, 12 October 1999
- IATA: LXV; ICAO: KLXV; FAA LID: LXV

Summary
- Airport type: Public
- Owner: County Commissioner of Lake County
- Serves: Leadville, Colorado
- Elevation AMSL: 9,934 ft / 3,026 m
- Coordinates: 39°13′13″N 106°19′00″W
- Website: www.klxvairport.com
- Interactive map of Lake County Airport

Runways
Direction	Length		Surface
Direction	ft	m	Surface
16/34	6,400	1,951	Asphalt

Helipads
Number	Length		Surface
Number	ft	m	Surface
H1	150	46	Concrete

Statistics (2008)
- Aircraft operations: 10,000
- Based aircraft: 11
- Source: Federal Aviation Administration

Lake County Airport (IATA: LXV, ICAO: KLXV, FAA LID: LXV), also known as Leadville Airport, is a county-owned public-use airport located two nautical miles (3.7 km) southwest of the central business district of Leadville, a city in Lake County, Colorado, United States.

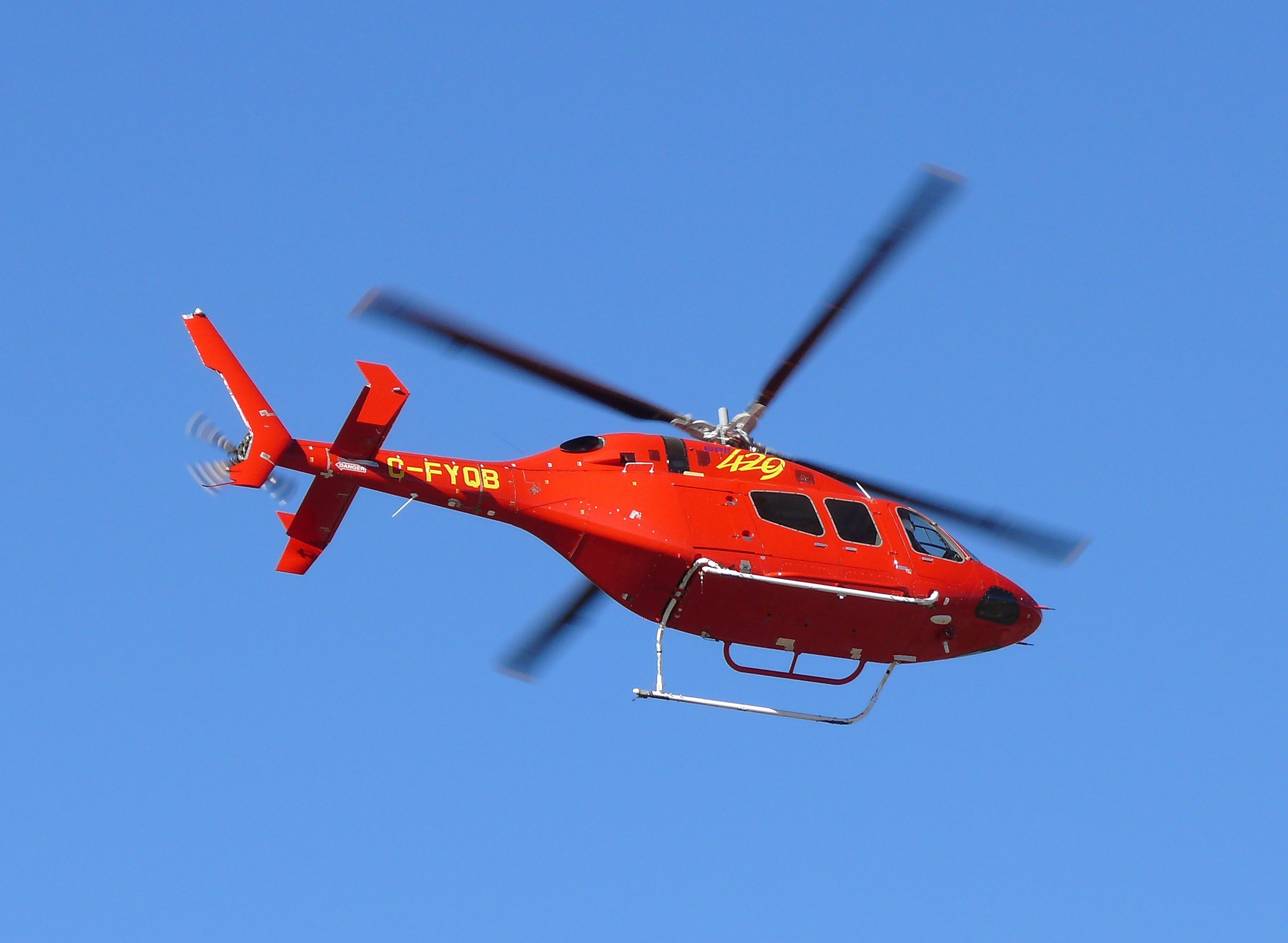
High-altitude tests performed for Bell 429 helicopter

According to the FAA's National Plan of Integrated Airport Systems for 2009–2013, it is categorized as a general aviation airport.

At an elevation of 9,934 ft (3,026 m) above mean sea level the airport is North America's highest. Pilots receive a free certificate commemorating their landing upon a successful arrival. Aircraft performance deteriorates rapidly with altitude, so many organizations use the Leadville Airport as a base for high-altitude performance testing.

== Facilities and aircraft ==
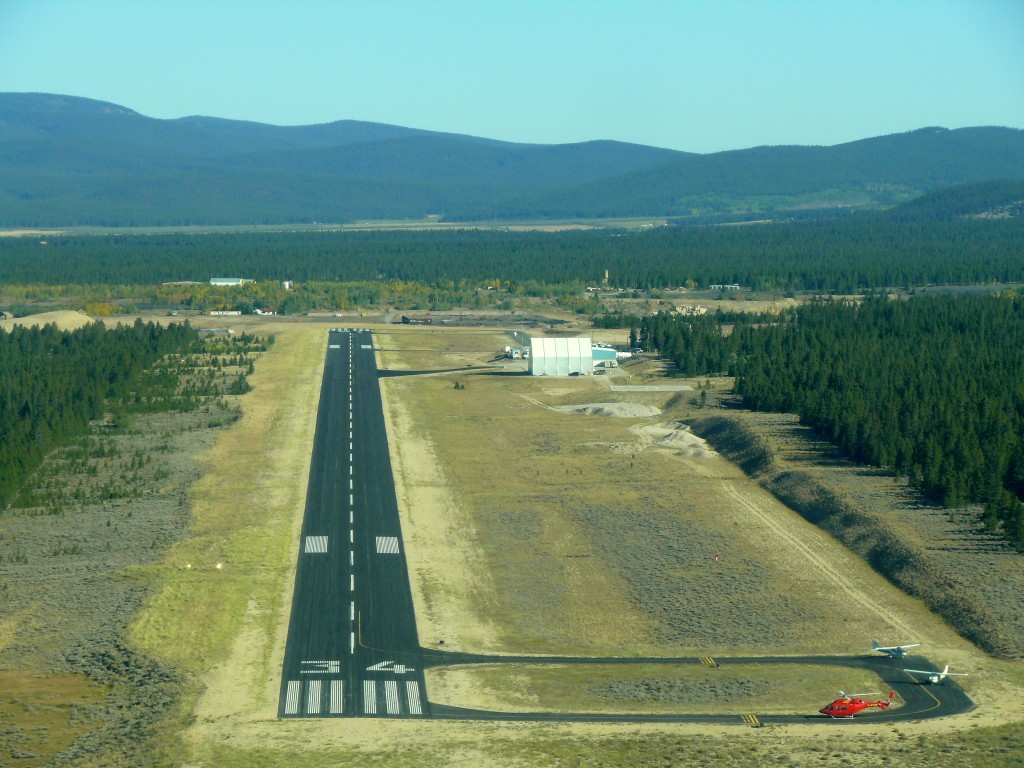
Short approach to runway 34 at Lake County Airport

Lake County Airport covers an area of 605 acres (245 ha). It has one asphalt paved runway designated 16/34 which measures 6,400 by 75 feet (1,951 x 23 m). It also has one helipad designated H1 with a concrete surface measuring 150 by 100 feet (46 x 30 m).

For the 12-month period ending December 31, 2008, the airport had 10,000 aircraft operations, an average of 27 per day: 78% general aviation, 20% military, and 2% air taxi. At that time there were 11 aircraft based at this airport, all single-engine.

At one point, the airport had scheduled passenger airline service. Rocky Mountain Airways operated flights with de Havilland Canada DHC-6 Twin Otter turboprop aircraft to Denver, thus earning Lake County Airport the distinction of being the highest airfield in the U.S. ever to receive airline service.

The highest helicopter flight training school in the world, RAVCO, operates out of the Lake County Airport. Their Mountain/High Altitude Test and Training Site (M/HATTS) is acknowledged as having the highest landing zone for training in the Continental United States of America (CONUS).

== See also ==
- List of airports in Colorado
