= Buffalo Pass (Continental Divide) =

Mountain pass in Colorado, USA

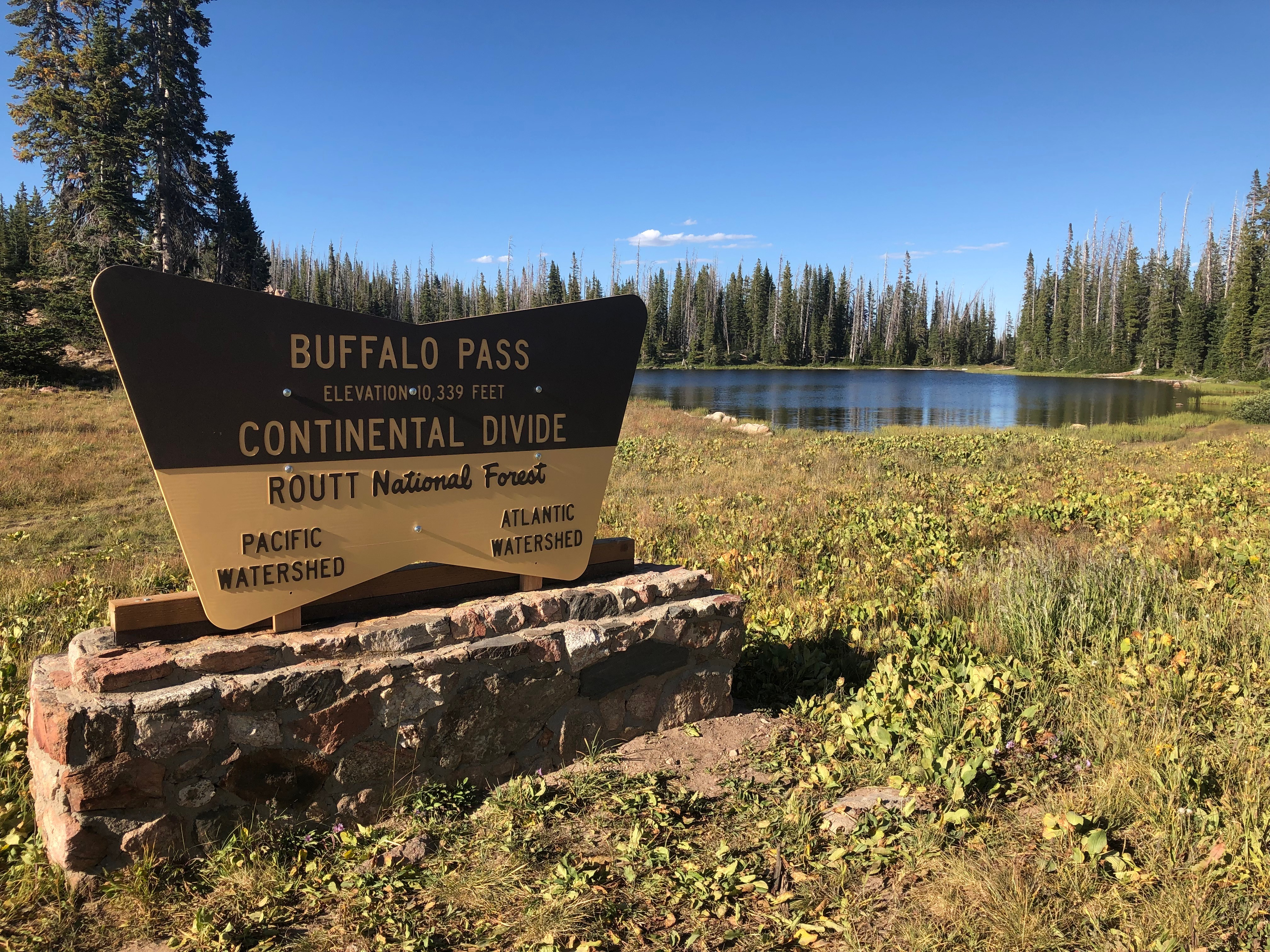
- The continental divide sign at the pass
- Interactive map of Buffalo Pass
- Elevation: 10,180 ft (3,100 m)
- Traversed by: Unimproved road

Third Approach
- Location: Jackson / Routt counties, Colorado, U.S.
- Range: Park Range
- Coordinates: 40°32′37″N 106°41′06″W
- Topo map: USGS Buffalo Pass

Buffalo Pass, elevation 10,180 ft (3,100 m), is a mountain pass that crosses the Continental Divide in the Park Range of the Rocky Mountains of northern Colorado in the United States.

== History ==
On December 4, 1978, Rocky Mountain Airways Flight 217 crashed on Buffalo Pass after encountering severe icing conditions and downdrafts. 20 out of the 22 passengers and crew would survive the crash, which prompted media to call the "Miracle on Buffalo Pass".

== Climate ==
Tower is a weather station at the summit of Buffalo Pass. Tower has a subalpine climate (Köppen Dfc).

Climate data for Tower, Colorado, 1991–2020 normals, 1986-2020 extremes: 10500ft (3200m)
Month	Jan	Feb	Mar	Apr	May	Jun	Jul	Aug	Sep	Oct	Nov	Dec	Year
Record high °F (°C)	52 (11)	56 (13)	62 (17)	66 (19)	72 (22)	78 (26)	80 (27)	78 (26)	74 (23)	64 (18)	63 (17)	50 (10)	80 (27)
Mean maximum °F (°C)	38.9 (3.8)	40.3 (4.6)	47.4 (8.6)	54.6 (12.6)	62.4 (16.9)	69.2 (20.7)	71.8 (22.1)	72.8 (22.7)	67.3 (19.6)	57.7 (14.3)	47.1 (8.4)	38.4 (3.6)	73.9 (23.3)
Mean daily maximum °F (°C)	22.7 (−5.2)	25.1 (−3.8)	32.5 (0.3)	39.7 (4.3)	48.9 (9.4)	58.2 (14.6)	65.5 (18.6)	63.8 (17.7)	55.4 (13.0)	42.5 (5.8)	30.0 (−1.1)	22.1 (−5.5)	42.2 (5.7)
Daily mean °F (°C)	15.8 (−9.0)	17.2 (−8.2)	24.2 (−4.3)	29.9 (−1.2)	39.0 (3.9)	48.4 (9.1)	55.7 (13.2)	54.2 (12.3)	46.5 (8.1)	34.3 (1.3)	22.9 (−5.1)	15.4 (−9.2)	33.6 (0.9)
Mean daily minimum °F (°C)	8.7 (−12.9)	9.3 (−12.6)	15.3 (−9.3)	20.1 (−6.6)	29.3 (−1.5)	38.6 (3.7)	45.9 (7.7)	44.6 (7.0)	37.3 (2.9)	26.1 (−3.3)	16.1 (−8.8)	8.5 (−13.1)	25.0 (−3.9)
Mean minimum °F (°C)	−8.7 (−22.6)	−8.0 (−22.2)	−0.5 (−18.1)	5.1 (−14.9)	15.2 (−9.3)	26.5 (−3.1)	37.0 (2.8)	36.3 (2.4)	22.3 (−5.4)	8.8 (−12.9)	−3.3 (−19.6)	−10.4 (−23.6)	−15.1 (−26.2)
Record low °F (°C)	−19 (−28)	−30 (−34)	−13 (−25)	−10 (−23)	2 (−17)	19 (−7)	25 (−4)	28 (−2)	8 (−13)	−7 (−22)	−19 (−28)	−29 (−34)	−30 (−34)
Average precipitation inches (mm)	7.96 (202)	7.20 (183)	6.20 (157)	6.92 (176)	4.77 (121)	2.47 (63)	1.68 (43)	1.58 (40)	3.06 (78)	4.47 (114)	6.36 (162)	6.94 (176)	59.61 (1,515)
Average extreme snow depth inches (cm)	91.8 (233)	113.4 (288)	123.2 (313)	127.2 (323)	111.3 (283)	76.8 (195)	8.9 (23)	0.5 (1.3)	3.9 (9.9)	16.2 (41)	35.3 (90)	64.9 (165)	128.1 (325)
Average precipitation days (≥ 0.01 in)	19.7	18.7	18.1	18.5	15.1	8.7	6.7	7.5	9.5	12.5	15.4	18.8	169.2
Source 1: XMACIS2 (normals, extremes & 2004-2020 snow depth)
Source 2: NOAA (precip/precip days)

== See also ==
- Southern Rocky Mountains
  - Park Range
- Colorado mountain passes
