= Aspen/Pitkin County Airport =

Airport serving Aspen, Colorado, USA

Aspen/Pitkin County Airport Sardy Field
- IATA: ASE; ICAO: KASE; FAA LID: ASE

Summary
- Airport type: Public
- Owner: Pitkin County
- Serves: Aspen, Colorado
- Elevation AMSL: 7,820 ft (2,380 m)
- Coordinates: 39°13′23″N 106°52′08″W
- Website: aspenairport.com

Map
- Location of airport in Colorado ASE (the United States)

Runways
Direction	Length		Surface
Direction	ft	m	Surface
15/33	8,006	2,440	Asphalt

Statistics (2024)
- Aircraft operations: 48,502
- Based aircraft (2020): 95
- Total passengers: 698,000
- Source: Federal Aviation Administration

Aspen/Pitkin County Airport (IATA: ASE, ICAO: KASE, FAA LID: ASE), also known as Sardy Field, is a county-owned public-use airport located three miles (3 nmi; 5 km) northwest of the central business district of Aspen, in Pitkin County, Colorado, United States. The airport covers an area of 573 acres (232 ha) at an elevation of 7,820 feet (2,384 m) above mean sea level. It has one asphalt paved runway designated 15/33 which measures 8,006 by 100 feet (2,440 x 30 m).

The Federal Aviation Administration (FAA) National Plan of Integrated Airport Systems for 2023–2027 categorized it as a non-hub primary commercial service facility.

== History ==
The site of Aspen/Pitkin County Airport was first occupied by settlers in 1881, with the establishment of the Stapleton ranch, a 320-acre (130 ha) homestead. The first building on the site, a log cabin, sat on the east side of the present-day runway. The Stapleton family grew potatoes and raised animals, including sheep, cattle, and hogs.

A private gravel airstrip opened on the Stapleton ranch in 1946, promoted by Walter Paepcke and John Spachner. The airstrip was open to the public, but was mostly used by the aviation department of the Aspen Institute, the precursor of Aspen Airways.

The Pitkin County government gained control of the gravel airstrip in the 1956, and began a project to pave the runway. County commissioner Tom Sardy headed the project, and the airport was renamed Sardy Field in his honor in 1958.

The original paved runway was 5,000 by 50 feet (1,524 by 15 m). The runway has been expanded four times since, reaching its current dimensions in 2011.

== Facilities ==
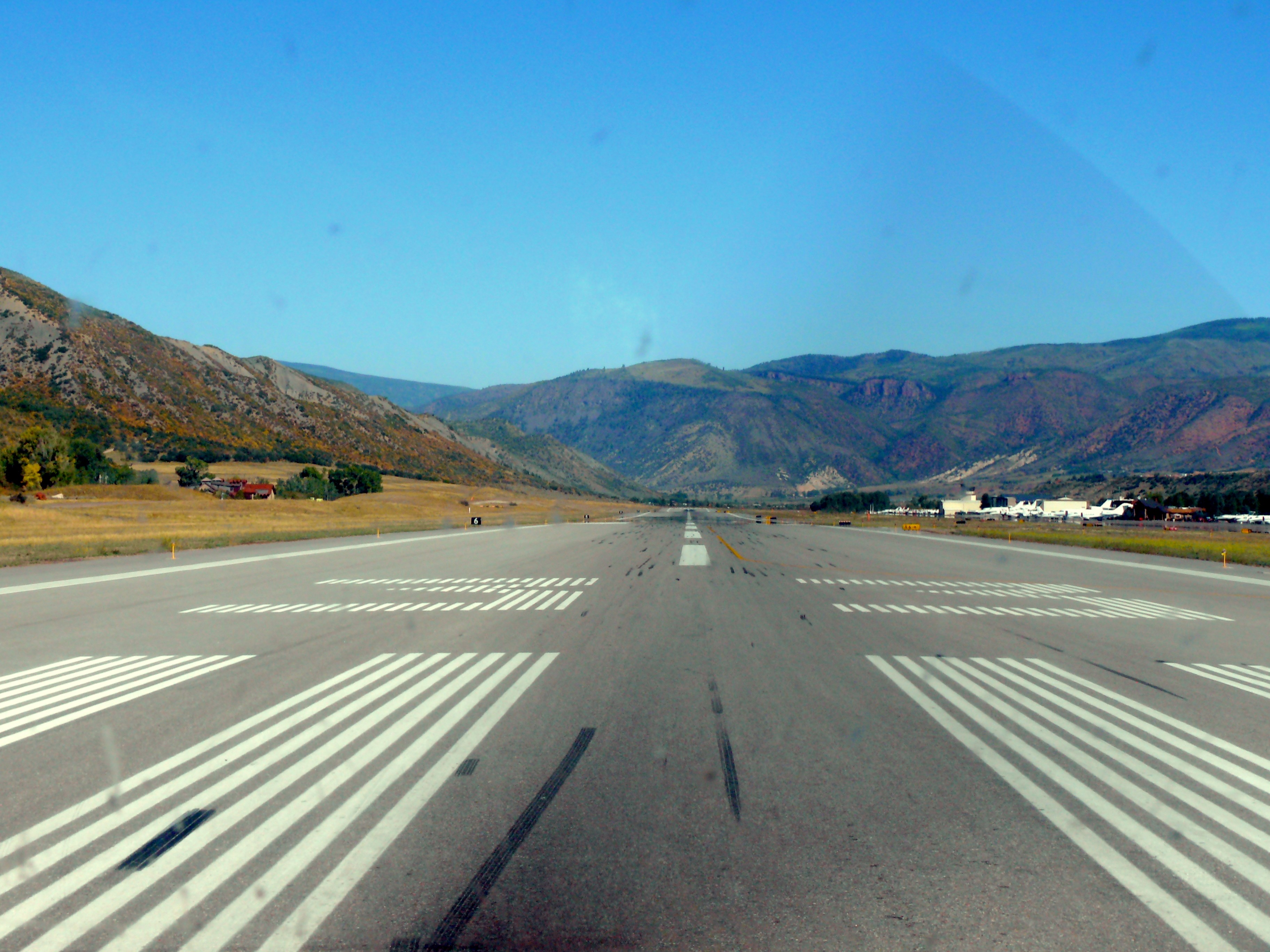
Runway 33

For the 12 month period of calendar year 2025, the airport had 46,744 aircraft operations: 30% general aviation, 32% air taxi, 29% scheduled commercial, 8% civil and 0.3% military. The most recent data shows there were 77 aircraft based at this airport: 52 single-engine, 6 multi-engine, 15 jet, 3 helicopter, and 1 glider.

Aspen/Pitkin Co. Airport has more regular service from major carriers than any other regional ski town airport in North America. In the winter, its regular, weekly flights number more than 170 (not including extra flights often run during busy holiday seasons). In addition to regular service from Denver, Aspen sees more than 20 flights a week from Chicago and Los Angeles.

=== Runway ===
In 2007, the runway was completely rehabilitated with new grooved asphalt. A partial length parallel taxiway A is located 320 ft (98 m) from the runway centerline on the east side of the runway, and serves general aviation on the north end of the airport and the commercial terminal on the south end. The airport meets modified FAA D-III airport reference code standards.

On April 4, 2011, the airport began a $15.5 million runway extension project which added 1,000 feet (305 m) of runway length to the existing runway, bringing the total length to 8,006 ft (2,440 m). This project was completed on November 2, 2011.

As of March 2025, the runway pavement is years beyond its useful life. Although surface-level repairs, funded by the FAA, have kept the runway safe and operational, the agency announced in 2024 that it would no longer finance such repairs. Instead, it stated that future funding would only be available for a full runway replacement, contingent on the new design meeting current Category III standards. Meeting those standards would require shifting the runway 80 feet (24 m) west to ensure a 400-foot (122 m) separation from the taxiway. The airport also plans to widen the runway from 100 to 150 feet (30 to 46 m). However, the proposal to relocate and expand the runway has been contentious, with critics arguing that it would open the door to more and larger aircraft, bringing more people to the area. In November 2024, voters approved the proposed changes and reaffirmed county officials’ authority to implement modifications to the airport's physical layout. As of March 2025, airport officials plan a one-month runway closure in May 2025 for maintenance, with construction of the new, realigned runway scheduled from early March through October 2027.

=== Terminal ===
The Aspen/Pitkin County airport terminal is a 44,000 square feet (4,100 m^{2}) single-floor facility, which has undergone several renovations since its original construction in 1976. The airport terminal hosts six rental car operations, a year-round guest services operation, plus Jeddadiahs, a restaurant and gift shop. The terminal has a cellphone parking lot to accommodate motorists waiting to pick up passengers. The 40 spaced parking lot is located to allow motorists to loop and re-access the terminal without getting back on Colorado State Highway 82.

== Operations ==
=== Safety ===
The Aspen/Pitkin County Airport is certificated as a Class I, ARFF Index B commercial service airport under FAR Part 139. The airport's operations department is responsible for daily compliance with FAA Part 139, including daily airport safety inspections in addition to rules and regulations enforcement. Since 2019, the airport has maintained its own fire department which provides aircraft rescue and firefighting (ARFF) response, structural firefighting capability and emergency medical services to airport property. The Pitkin County Sheriff's Office has the primary responsibility of law enforcement and shares in incident management for emergency response to events occurring on airport property In 2017, the airport took delivery of a new Oshkosh Striker 3000 Index B ARFF truck. Mutual aid response to airport incidents is provided by the Aspen Fire Department, Roaring Fork Fire Rescue, Aspen Ambulance, and others.

Airport operations staff operates from the airport's Operations Center, constructed in 2006 on the west side of the airport. This facility houses airport operations and facilities maintenance staff, as well as the airport's fleet of ARFF, snow removal, and other airport equipment.

=== Services ===
General aviation services are provided by Atlantic Aviation, the airport's sole fixed-base operator.

The FAA has installed an FAA Weather Camera in addition to the Automated surface observing system (ASOS) available to help pilots determine the weather conditions at Aspen airport and the surrounding area.

=== Restrictions ===
The airport has several unique operating limitations due to local legislation, the constrained size of the airfield, and its location in a high elevation mountain valley. As of 2024, aircraft at ASE are restricted to a wingspan of 95 feet (29 m), to give the necessary separation between aircraft on the runway and on the parallel taxiway, with a maximum weight of 100,000 pounds (45,000 kg), due to the condition of the runway. These restrictions influence the commercial airline services provided at ASE, which must use regional aircraft to comply with the weight and size limits. Most mainline aircraft, such as the Boeing 737, are generally prohibited from the airport due to these restrictions.

ASE has a curfew in place which prohibits operations between 11 pm and 7 am local time. No aircraft departures are permitted after 10:30 pm. Jet aircraft with louder engines, under the FAA Stage II category, are permitted to take off no more than 30 minutes after official sunset.

For most aircraft operations, especially commercial passenger flights, planes must land to the south on runway 15 and take off to the north on runway 33, due to the mountain range to the south of the runway. This means aircraft taking off and landing fly towards each other. It can also lead to delays, cancellations, and weight restrictions depending on wind strength and direction.

Commercial passenger flights must be flown by crews with special qualification and aircraft certified by the FAA to have enough performance to fly the steep approach to the airport and perform the demanding go-around procedure during an aborted landing. As of 2024, SkyWest Airlines is the only commercial operator with crews qualified to operate into Aspen and the only aircraft currently certified are the Bombardier CRJ700 and Embraer 175.

== Airlines and destinations ==
=== Passenger ===
Airlines	Destinations
Aero	Charter: Los Angeles–Van Nuys; Seasonal charter: Teterboro
American Eagle	Dallas/Fort Worth; Seasonal: Austin, Charlotte, Chicago–O'Hare, Los Angeles, Phoenix–Sky Harbor
Delta Connection	Atlanta, Los Angeles
United Express	Denver, Houston–Intercontinental, Los Angeles; Seasonal: Chicago–O'Hare, San Francisco

== Statistics ==
Top destinations from ASE (January 2025 – December 2025)
Rank	Airport	Passengers	Carriers
1	Denver, Colorado	141,720	United
2	Dallas/Fort Worth, Texas	55,000	American
3	Los Angeles, California	47,620	American, Delta, United
4	Chicago–O'Hare, Illinois	43,700	American, United
5	Houston, Texas	25,030	United
6	Atlanta, Georgia	18,860	Delta
7	San Francisco, California	16,840	United
8	Austin, Texas	5,730	American
9	Phoenix–Sky Harbor, Arizona	4,900	American

== Accidents and incidents ==
- On January 14, 1970, an Aspen Airways Convair CV-240-12 (registration N270L) landed on the runway with its landing gear raised. The pilot in command wanted to keep the airspeed above 130 knots in case a go-around was required, and failed to extend the landing gear on short final. The gear warning horn did not sound. There were no injuries.
- On January 5, 1989, a Federal Express Cessna 208B Super Cargomaster (registration N945FE) executed a missed approach but failed to do so in accordance with published missed approach procedures, resulting in a collision with trees. The pilot, the only occupant, was uninjured.
- On February 13, 1991, a Richmor Aviation Learjet 35A (registration N535PC) stalled and collided with terrain and killed all three people on board. The FAA determined the flight crew's failure to maintain airspeed and control of the aircraft, as well as the execution of an unstabilized approach and the snow-covered mountainous terrain, to be contributing factors.
- On January 6, 1996, a Learjet 60 (registration XA-ICA) touched down in a snow-covered field 1,000 ft (300 m) from the runway threshold and 25 ft (8 m) right of the runway centerline. The nose gear collapsed and the aircraft slid through several snow berms before coming to a halt on the runway at the 4,000 ft (1,200 m) mark. It was determined by FAA investigators that sun glare, the snow-covered runway, and the airport's failure to properly remove snow from the runway were the causes for the crash.
- On March 29, 2001, a Gulfstream III (registration N303GA), owned by Avjet Corporation, crashed on approach to runway 15 killing all 18 occupants on board. The flight crew's operation of the aircraft below minimum descent altitude without visual reference with the runway was determined to be the main cause, but the FAA also recognized that an unclear NOTAM that was issued for the approach confused the flight crew. Additionally, the FAA's failure to communicate the restrictions to Aspen Tower controllers contributed. The pilot was also under pressure to land from the onboard customer.
- On June 7, 2009, a Learjet 60 (registration N500SW) veered off the runway on landing and came to rest on the right side of the runway with a collapsed right main gear, with no injuries to the eight persons on board.
- On January 5, 2014, a Bombardier Challenger 600 (registration N115WF) crashed upon landing and experienced a post-impact fire, killing one occupant and seriously injuring the other two persons on board. A National Transportation Safety Board report in 2017 concluded that the crash was due to pilot inexperience as they attempted to land with 25 knot wind gusts and failed "to conduct a go-around when the approach became unstabilized".

== See also ==
- List of airports in Colorado
