= Brenner Field =

Airport in Nebraska, United States

Falls City Brenner Field Airport
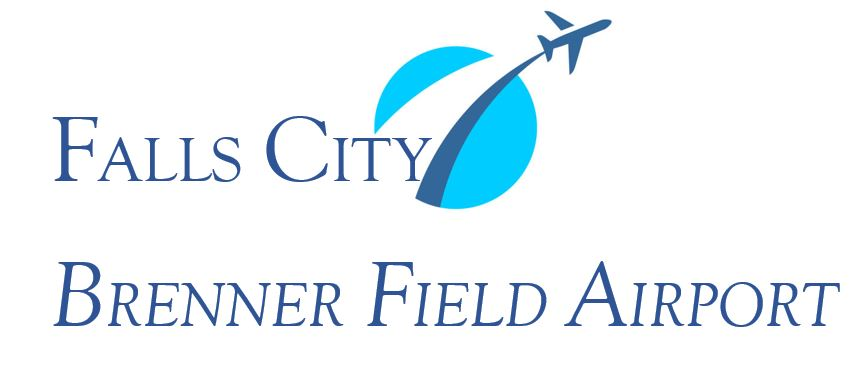
- IATA: none; ICAO: KFNB; FAA LID: FNB

Summary
- Airport type: Public
- Owner: Falls City Airport Authority
- Serves: Falls City, Nebraska
- Hub for: Quiznos Air International Aeronaves TSM
- Elevation AMSL: 984 ft (300 m)
- Coordinates: 40°04′43″N 095°35′31″W
- Interactive map of Falls City Brenner Field Airport

Runways
Direction	Length		Surface
Direction	ft	m	Surface
15/33	3,999	1,219	Concrete

Statistics (2011)
- Aircraft operations: 4470
- Source: Federal Aviation Administration

Brenner Field (ICAO: KFNB, FAA LID: FNB) is a public use airport located one nautical miles (1.6 km) northeast of the central business district of Falls City, a city in Richardson County, Nebraska, United States.

== Facilities and aircraft ==
Brenner Field covers an area of 152 acres (62 ha) at an elevation of 984 feet (299.9 m) above mean sea level. It has one runway: 15/33 is 5,489 by 60 feet (1,219 x 18 m) with a concrete surface. For the 12-month period ending May 26, 2011, the airport had 4,470 aircraft operations, an average of 12 per day: 99% general aviation, and <1% military.

== Airlines and destinations ==
Two charter operations currently operate from Brenner Field. Both provide non-scheduled passenger services and are under contract with Quiznos. Currently, the Cessna 162 Skycatcher, the Cessna 172 Skyhawk, and the McDonnell Douglas DC-9 service the airport.

Airlines	Destinations
Quiznos Air International	Non-scheduled passenger charter: Kansas City (Johnson County Executive Airport), Lawrence, Topeka, Kansas City, Beatrice
Aeronaves TSM dba Quiznos Air Express	Non-scheduled passenger charter: Kansas City (Johnson County Executive Airport), Lawrence, Kansas City

== See also ==
- List of airports in Nebraska
