= BVN (disambiguation) =

BVN is a Dutch public television channel.

BVN or bvn could also refer to:

== Companies ==
- BVN Architecture, an Australian architecture company
- Baron Aviation Services, an American cargo airline, by ICAO code
- Compañía de Minas Buenaventura, a Peruvian precious metals company, by stock ticker
- Bolsa de Valores de Nicaragua, a stock exchange in Nicaragua
- Blockbuster Video Network, one of the many businesses owned by the family of Siddick Chady, a Mauritian doctor and politician

== Other uses ==
- Bank Verification Number, a biometric identity system used by the Central Bank of Nigeria
- Buna language, a language spoken in Papua New Guinea, by ISO 639 code
- Albion Municipal Airport, an airport in Albion, Nebraska, U.S., by FAA code
- Bayankhongor Airport, an airport in Bayankhongor, Mongolia, by IATA code
- Biswan railway station, a train station in India; see List of railway stations in India#B
- Bavenite, a cheap yet rare mineral
