= Kearney Regional Airport =

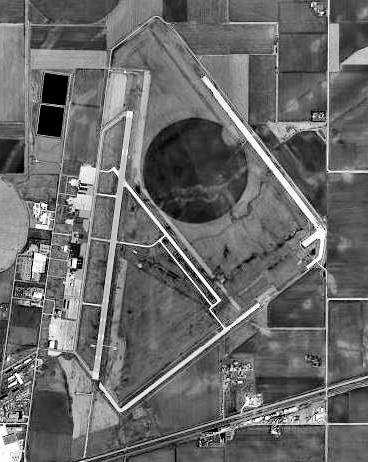
- USGS 1999 orthophoto
- IATA: EAR; ICAO: KEAR; FAA LID: EAR

Summary
- Airport type: Public
- Owner: City of Kearney
- Serves: Kearney, Nebraska
- Location: Center Township, Buffalo County, Nebraska
- Elevation AMSL: 2,131 ft (650 m)
- Coordinates: 40°43′37″N 099°00′24″W
- Website: www.FlyKearney.com

Map
- Location within Nebraska Location within the United States

Runways
Direction	Length		Surface
Direction	ft	m	Surface
18/36	7,094	2,162	Concrete
13/31	4,498	1,371	Concrete

Statistics (2021)
- Aircraft operations (year ending 10/31/2021: 21,770
- Based aircraft: 33
- Source: Federal Aviation Administration

Kearney Regional Airport (IATA: EAR, ICAO: KEAR, FAA LID: EAR) (formerly Kearney Municipal Airport) is an airport five miles northeast of Kearney in Buffalo County, Nebraska.

Federal Aviation Administration records say the airport had 11,956 passenger boardings (enplanements) in calendar year 2008, 10,113 in 2009 and 9,530 in 2010. The National Plan of Integrated Airport Systems for 2011–2015 categorized it as a primary commercial service airport based on enplanements over 10,000 in 2008, but is non-primary commercial service based on enplanements in 2010.

== History ==
In 1940 Kearney had a population of 9,643. In the early 1940s, three Nebraska cities, Kearney, Grand Island and Hastings joined to form the Central Nebraska Defense Council when it was learned that the United States Army Air Forces was considering the site for a military airfield. The group attempted to convince Washington that central Nebraska was a suitable location. Kearney and Grand Island effectively competed as locations for defense airports which would serve to store aircraft made at Offutt Field and the Glenn L. Martin Bomber Plant near Omaha.

In early 1941, the City of Kearney approved a $60,000 bond to finance a new airport. Kearney Regional Airport began as Keens Municipal Airport. The cost was more than $360,000, with the balance funded by the Works Progress Administration (WPA). Construction began at the site on Highway 30 on October 21, 1941, and was dedicated as Keens Airport on August 23, 1942. The facility boasted asphalt runways and one hangar. A handful of buildings from the military era remain at Kearney Airport, notably Hangar #385.

The first airline service was provided by Mid-West operating Cessna 190s in 1950–52; Frontier Airlines' DC-3s began serving the airport in 1959. Frontier's Convairs lasted until 1979.

In 2008, a newly constructed Armed Forces Reserve Center at the airport housing non-flying units of both the U.S. Army Reserve and the Nebraska Army National Guard was dedicated.

The Essential Air Service has supported scheduled passenger service to Denver since 1997. The FAA's contract for the route was with Denver Air Connection from 2022 to 2024 and is with regional operator SkyWest Airlines from 2024 to 2027.

Flights from Kearney to Chicago O'Hare started in late 2019, but were suspended because of COVID-19-related-pilot and staffing shortages in 2022; the Kearney City Council approved restoration of the service in 2025.

In December 2022, U.S. Sen. Deb Fisher (R) announced that Kearney Regional Airport had been earmarked as the recipient of a $6.28 million grant from the Federal Aviation Administration. According to Mike Morgan, the City Manager of Kearney, funds allocated by the grant will go toward a variety of facility renovation and expansion projects that should enable the airport to "meet the increased passenger demand for years to come." The federal grant comes on the heels of several years of record growth at the airport and a construction project, contracted out by the city of Kearney earlier that year, for a $4.77 million expansion to increase the terminal building's size by 64% and include an additional TSA screening checkpoint, a baggage scanner, greater secure holding space, and more baggage storage and family restrooms.

== Facilities ==
Kearney Regional Airport covers 2,500 acres (1,012 ha) at an elevation of 2,131 feet (650 m). It has two runways: 18/36 is 7,094 by 100 feet (2,162 x 30 m) concrete; 13/31 is 4,498 by 75 feet (1,371 x 23 m) concrete.

In the year ending October 31, 2021 the airport had 21,770 aircraft operations, average 60 per day: 87% general aviation, 10% airline, 3% air taxi, and <1% military. 33 aircraft were then based at the airport: 25 single-engine, 3 multi-engine, 3 jet, and 3 helicopter.

== Airline and destinations ==
=== Passenger ===
Airlines	Destinations
United Express	Denver, Chicago–O'Hare

=== Cargo ===
Airlines	Destinations
FedEx Feeder operated by Baron Aviation	Omaha
Suburban Air Freight	Omaha

== See also ==
- List of airports in Nebraska

== Other sources ==
- Essential Air Service documents (Docket OST-1996-1715) from the U.S. Department of Transportation:
  - Order 2004-5-15 (May 20, 2004): selecting Great Lakes Aviation, Ltd., to provide essential air service with subsidy support at Grand Island, Kearney, McCook, North Platte, and Scottsbluff, Nebraska, for two years at a total annual subsidy of $5,233,287.
  - Order 2006-6-26 (June 21, 2006): selecting Great Lakes Aviation, Ltd.. to provide essential air service with subsidy support at Kearney, North Platte, and Scottsbluff, Nebraska, for two years, beginning when Mesa Air Group d/b/a Air Midwest inaugurates service at Grand Island and McCook, at a total annual subsidy of $2,393,305 ($897,142 for Kearney; $976,026 for North Platte; and $520,137 for Scottsbluff). Each community will receive three nonstop round trips to Denver each weekday and weekend (18 total round trips per week) with Beech 1900-D aircraft.
  - Order 2008-7-33 (July 29, 2008): selecting Great Lakes Aviation, Ltd. to provide subsidized essential air service (EAS) at Kearney, North Platte, and Scottsbluff, Nebraska, for the two-year period beginning November 1, 2008, at a combined annual subsidy of $5,373,700 with 19-seat Beech 1900D aircraft.
  - Order 2010-9-10 (September 8, 2010): re-selecting Great Lakes Aviation, Ltd., operating as both a United Airlines and Frontier Airlines code share-partner (Great Lakes), to provide essential air service (EAS) at Kearney, North Platte, and Scottsbluff, Nebraska, for a combined annual subsidy of $5,344,690 for the two-year period from November 1, 2010, to October 31, 2012.
