= VTN =

VTN may refer to:

- Vitronectin, a glycoprotein
- Vietnam, ITU country code
- Victory Television Network, a religious independent television network
- Violet Town railway station, Australia
- Miller Field (airport), Valentine, Nebraska (IATA code)
- Vaitarna railway station (Indian Railways code)
- Vleuten railway station, Netherlands (NS abberivation)
- Vertumnite, a transparent silicate mineral (mineral symbol); see List of mineral symbols
- Andringitra (plant) (CoL taxon identifier)
