= List of airports in Nebraska =

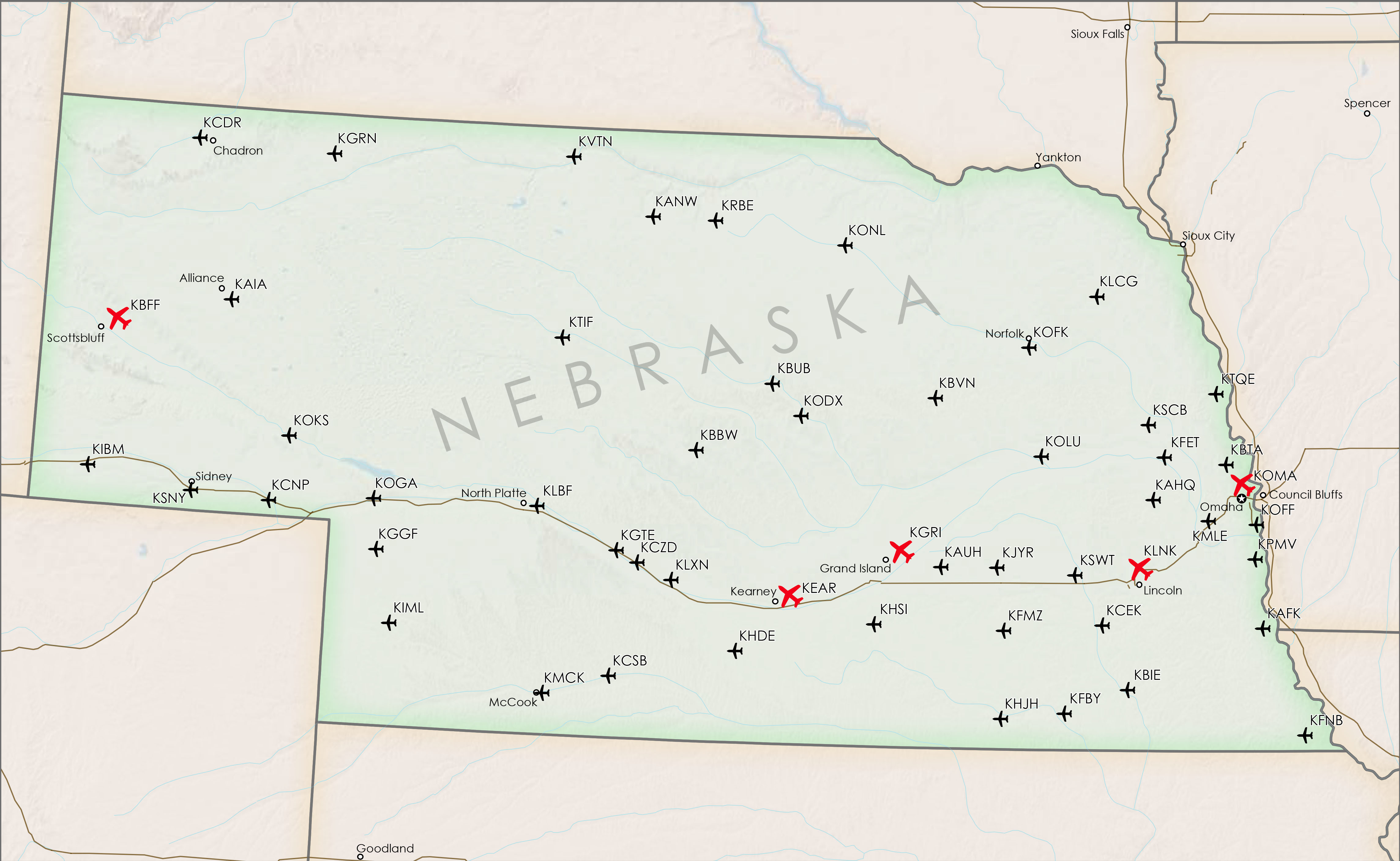
Airports of Nebraska

This is a list of airports in Nebraska (a U.S. state), grouped by type and sorted by location. It contains all public-use and military airports in the state. Some private-use and former airports may be included where notable, such as airports that were previously public-use, those with commercial enplanements recorded by the FAA or airports assigned an IATA airport code.

== Airports ==
This list contains the following information:

- **City served** – The city generally associated with the airport, as per the airport's master record with the Federal Aviation Administration. This is not always the actual location since some airports are located in smaller towns outside of the city they serve. It is not meant to be a complete list of cities served, which can be found in or added to each airport's Wikipedia article.
- **FAA** – The location identifier assigned by the Federal Aviation Administration (FAA). These are linked to each airport's page at the Nebraska Department of Aeronautics web site.
- **IATA** – The airport code assigned by the International Air Transport Association (IATA). Those that do not match the FAA code are shown in bold.
- **ICAO** – The location indicator assigned by the International Civil Aviation Organization (ICAO).
- **Airport name** – The official airport name. Those shown in **bold** indicate the airport has scheduled passenger service on commercial airlines.
- **Role** – One of four FAA airport categories, as per the 2021–2025 National Plan of Integrated Airport Systems (NPIAS) report released September 2020:
  - P-s: Commercial service – primary are publicly owned airports that receive scheduled passenger service and have more than 10,000 passenger boardings (enplanements) each year. Each primary airport is sub-classified by the FAA as one of the following four "hub" types (s):
    - L: Large hub that accounts for at least 1% of total U.S. passenger enplanements.
    - M: Medium hub that accounts for between 0.25% and 1% of total U.S. passenger enplanements.
    - S: Small hub that accounts for between 0.05% and 0.25% of total U.S. passenger enplanements.
    - N: Nonhub that accounts for less than 0.05% of total U.S. passenger enplanements, but more than 10,000 annual enplanements.
  - CS: Commercial service – nonprimary are publicly owned airports that receive scheduled passenger service and have at least 2,500 passenger boardings each year.
  - R: Reliever airports are designated by the FAA to relieve congestion at a large commercial service airport and to provide more general aviation access to the overall community.
  - GA: General aviation airports are the largest single group of airports in the U.S. airport system. They are public-use airports that do not have scheduled service or have scheduled service with less than 2,500 passenger boardings each year.
- **Enplanements** – The number of enplanements (commercial passenger boardings) that occurred at the airport in calendar year 2024, as per FAA records released October 2025.

City served	FAA	IATA	ICAO	Airport name	Role	Enplanements (2024)
				**Commercial service – primary airports**		
Grand Island	GRI	GRI	KGRI	**Central Nebraska Regional Airport**	P-N	67,747
Kearney	EAR	EAR	KEAR	**Kearney Regional Airport** (was Kearney Municipal)	P-N	14,130
Lincoln	LNK	LNK	KLNK	**Lincoln Airport** (was Lincoln Municipal)	P-N	129,968
North Platte	LBF	LBF	KLBF	**North Platte Regional Airport** (Lee Bird Field)	P-N	16,537
Omaha	OMA	OMA	KOMA	**Eppley Airfield**	P-M	2,583,212
Scottsbluff	BFF	BFF	KBFF	**Western Nebraska Regional Airport** (William B. Heilig Field)	P-N	13,841
				**Commercial service – nonprimary airports**		
Alliance	AIA	AIA	KAIA	**Alliance Municipal Airport**	CS	4,207
Chadron	CDR	CDR	KCDR	**Chadron Municipal Airport**	CS	1,317
				**Reliever airports**		
Omaha (Millard)	MLE	**MIQ**	KMLE	Millard Airport	R	13
				**General aviation airports**		
Ainsworth	ANW	ANW	KANW	Ainsworth Regional Airport (was Ainsworth Municipal)	GA	2
Albion	BVN		KBVN	Albion Municipal Airport	GA	0
Alma	4D9			Alma Municipal Airport	GA	0
Atkinson	8V2			Stuart-Atkinson Municipal Airport	GA	0
Auburn	K01			Farington Field	GA	0
Aurora	AUH		KAUH	Aurora Municipal Airport (Al Potter Field)	GA	0
Bassett	RBE		KRBE	Rock County Airport	GA	0
Beatrice	BIE	BIE	KBIE	Beatrice Municipal Airport	GA	0
Blair	BTA		KBTA	Blair Municipal Airport	GA	3
Broken Bow	BBW	BBW	KBBW	Broken Bow Municipal Airport (Keith Glaze Field)	GA	0
Burwell	BUB	BUB	KBUB	Cram Field	GA	0
Cambridge	CSB		KCSB	Cambridge Municipal Airport	GA	0
Central City	07K			Central City Municipal Airport (Larry Reineke Field)	GA	0
Chappell	CNP		KCNP	Billy G. Ray Field	GA	0
Columbus	OLU	OLU	KOLU	Columbus Municipal Airport	GA	0
Cozad	CZD		KCZD	Cozad Municipal Airport	GA	2
Creighton	6K3			Creighton Municipal Airport	GA	0
Crete	CEK		KCEK	Crete Municipal Airport	GA	0
Curtis	47V			Curtis Municipal Airport	GA	0
David City	93Y			David City Municipal Airport	GA	0
Fairbury	FBY	FBY	KFBY	Fairbury Municipal Airport	GA	0
Fairmont	FMZ		KFMZ	Fairmont State Airfield	GA	0
Falls City	FNB		KFNB	Brenner Field	GA	0
Fremont	FET	FET	KFET	Fremont Municipal Airport	GA	0
Gordon	GRN	GRN	KGRN	Gordon Municipal Airport	GA	0
Grant	GGF		KGGF	Grant Municipal Airport	GA	0
Hartington	0B4			Hartington Municipal Airport (Bud Becker Field)	GA	0
Harvard	08K			Harvard State Airport (Harvard State Airfield)	GA	0
Hastings	HSI	HSI	KHSI	Hastings Municipal Airport	GA	0
Hebron	HJH		KHJH	Hebron Municipal Airport	GA	0
Holdrege	HDE	HDE	KHDE	Brewster Field	GA	0
Hyannis	1V2			Grant County Airport	GA	0
Imperial	IML	IML	KIML	Imperial Municipal Airport	GA	0
Kimball	IBM		KIBM	Kimball Municipal Airport (Robert E. Arraj Field)	GA	0
Lexington	LXN	LXN	KLXN	Jim Kelly Field	GA	0
Loup City	0F4			Loup City Municipal Airport	GA	0
McCook	MCK	MCK	KMCK	**McCook Ben Nelson Regional Airport**	GA	2,707
Minden	0V3			Pioneer Village Field	GA	0
Nebraska City	AFK		KAFK	Nebraska City Municipal Airport	GA	0
Neligh	4V9			Antelope County Airport	GA	5
Norfolk	OFK	OFK	KOFK	Norfolk Regional Airport (Karl Stefan Memorial Field)	GA	0
O'Neill	ONL	ONL	KONL	The O'Neill Municipal Airport (John L. Baker Field)	GA	0
Ogallala	OGA	OGA	KOGA	Searle Field	GA	0
Ord	ODX		KODX	Evelyn Sharp Field	GA	0
Oshkosh	OKS	OKS	KOKS	Garden County Airport (King Rhiley Field)	GA	0
Pawnee City	50K			Pawnee City Municipal Airport	GA	0
Pender	0C4			Pender Municipal Airport	GA	0
Plattsmouth	PMV		KPMV	Plattsmouth Municipal Airport (Douglas V. Duey Field)	GA	0
Red Cloud	7V7			Red Cloud Municipal Airport	GA	0
Rushville	9V5			Modisett Airport (Modisett Field)	GA	0
Sargent	09K			Sargent Municipal Airport	GA	0
Scribner	SCB	SCB	KSCB	Scribner State Airport (Scribner State Airfield)	GA	0
Seward	SWT		KSWT	Seward Municipal Airport	GA	0
Sidney	SNY	SNY	KSNY	Sidney Municipal Airport (Lloyd W. Carr Field)	GA	0
Superior	12K			Superior Municipal Airport	GA	0
Tecumseh	0G3			Tecumseh Municipal Airport	GA	0
Tekamah	TQE		KTQE	Tekamah Municipal Airport	GA	7
Thedford	TIF		KTIF	Thomas County Airport	GA	0
Valentine	VTN	VTN	KVTN	Miller Field	GA	22
Wahoo	AHQ		KAHQ	Wahoo Municipal Airport	GA	0
Wallace	64V			Wallace Municipal Airport	GA	0
Wayne	LCG		KLCG	Wayne Municipal Airport (Stan Morris Field)	GA	0
York	JYR		KJYR	York Municipal Airport	GA	0
				**Other public-use airports** (not listed in NPIAS)		
Alma	H63			Harlan County Lake Seaplane Base		
Arapahoe	37V	AHF		Arapahoe Municipal Airport		
Bloomfield	84Y			Bloomfield Municipal Airport		
Genoa	97Y			Genoa Municipal Airport		
Gothenburg	GTE		KGTE	Quinn Field		
Hay Springs	4V6			Hay Springs Municipal Airport		
Omaha	3NO			North Omaha Airport		
South Sioux City	7K8			Martin Field		
Utica	0J9			Flying V Airport		
				**Other military airports**		
Omaha	OFF	OFF	KOFF	Offutt Air Force Base		1,413
				**Notable private-use airports**		
Greeley	NE46			Greeley Municipal Airport		
Mullen	84NE			Hooker County Airport		
Weeping Water	NE69	EPG		Browns Airport		
				**Notable former airports**		
Arthur	~~38V~~			Arthur Municipal Airport (closed 2010?)		
Bruning				Bruning Army Airfield		
Harrison	~~9V3~~			Harrison Skyranch (closed 2006?)		
McCook				McCook Army Airfield		
Nebraska City	~~3GN~~			Grundman Field (closed 2003?)		
Papillion				South Omaha Airport (closed circa 1986)		
Sidney	~~7NE8~~			Western Nebraska Technical College Airfield was Sioux Army Depot Airfield, closed c. 1995.		
Springfield	~~72NE~~			J&J Airport		
Springview	~~9V1~~			Springview Municipal Airport (closed 2008?)		
Trenton	~~9V2~~			Trenton Municipal Airport (closed 2015)		
Wilber	~~0D6~~			Wilber Municipal Airport (closed 2008?)		

== See also ==
- Essential Air Service
- Nebraska World War II Army Airfields
- Wikipedia:WikiProject Aviation/Airline destination lists: North America#Nebraska
