= McCook Ben Nelson Regional Airport =

- IATA: MCK; ICAO: KMCK; FAA LID: MCK

Summary
- Airport type: Public
- Owner: City of McCook
- Serves: McCook, Nebraska
- Elevation AMSL: 2,583 ft / 787 m
- Coordinates: 40°12′23″N 100°35′32″W
- Website: MCK Website

Map

Runways
Direction	Length		Surface
Direction	ft	m	Surface
12/30	6,450	1,966	Concrete
4/22	4,000	1,219	Concrete
17/35	1,350	411	Turf

Statistics
- Aircraft operations (2019): 16,700
- Based aircraft (2022): 31
- Source: Federal Aviation Administration

McCook Ben Nelson Regional Airport (IATA: MCK, ICAO: KMCK, FAA LID: MCK) is two miles east of McCook, in Red Willow County, Nebraska. It was formerly McCook Municipal Airport and McCook Regional Airport. It sees one airline, subsidized by the Essential Air Service program.

The National Plan of Integrated Airport Systems for 2021–2025 called it a general aviation airport (the commercial service category requires 2,500 enplanements per year).

The airport is named after McCook-born Ben Nelson, a former United States Senator and the 37th Governor of Nebraska.

== History ==
During World War II, a larger training airfield was built eight miles north of McCook Regional to train heavy bomber crews. Known, somewhat confusingly, as McCook Army Airfield the base closed in 1945 and was transferred to state control and McCook State Airfield was renamed. It closed for good in 1969 and has largely reverted to farmland, but the five massive World War II-era hangars are still visible from the air.

== Facilities ==
The airport covers 667 acres (270 ha) at an elevation of 2,583 feet (787 m) above mean sea level. It has three runways: 12/30 is 6,450 by 100 feet (1,966 x 30 m) concrete; 4/22 is 4,000 by 75 feet (1,219 x 23 m) concrete; 17/35 is 1,350 by 160 feet (411 x 49 m) turf.

In the year ending March 31, 2019, the airport had 16,700 aircraft operations, an average of 46 per day: 90% general aviation, 9% air taxi and 1% military. In March 2022, there were 31 aircraft based at this airport: 28 single-engine and 3 multi-engine.

== Airlines and destinations ==
=== Passenger ===
Airlines	Destinations
Denver Air Connection	Denver

=== Cargo ===
The following airlines offer scheduled cargo service:

Airlines	Destinations
FedEx Feeder operated by Baron Aviation	Omaha

=== Former airlines ===
First airline flights were Mid-West Airlines Cessna 190s in 1950–51. Frontier DC-3s arrived in 1959, and its last Convair 580 left in 1979.

Air Midwest (U.S. Airways Express) began service on October 29, 2006, with two daily flights to Grand Island and on to Omaha Eppley Airfield and Kansas City International Airport.

== See also ==
- List of airports in Nebraska

== Other sources ==
- Essential Air Service documents (Docket OST-1997-3005) from the U.S. Department of Transportation:
  - Order 2006-6-26: selecting Air Midwest for service at Grand Island and McCook, Nebraska, for two years, beginning when the carrier inaugurates full service, at a total annual subsidy of $2,296,462 for both communities. McCook will receive two one-stop round trips each weekday and weekend to Omaha (12 one-stop round trips per week); both Grand Island and McCook will be served with 19-passenger Beech 1900-D aircraft.
  - Order 2008-2-2: prohibiting Air Midwest from terminating its subsidized service at nine communities for 30 days beyond the end of its 90-day notice period, and requesting long term proposals from carriers interested in providing essential air service at any or all of the communities, with or without subsidy, by February 29.
  - Order 2010-6-3: selecting Great Lakes Aviation, Ltd. to continue to provide essential air service (EAS) at McCook, Nebraska, at an annual subsidy rate of $1,796,795, for the next two-year period from June 1, 2010, through May 31, 2012.
  - Order 2012-1-28: requesting proposals from carriers interested in providing essential air service (EAS) at McCook, Nebraska, for the next two-year period from June 1, 2012, through June 30, 2014, with or without subsidy.
