= Blair Municipal Airport =

Airport in Blair Nebraska, United States

Blair Executive Airport
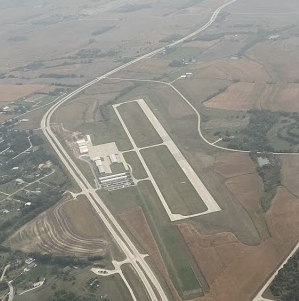
- IATA: none; ICAO: KBTA; FAA LID: BTA

Summary
- Airport type: Public
- Owner: Blair Airport Authority
- Serves: Blair, Nebraska and Omaha, Nebraska
- Elevation AMSL: 1,317.6 ft / 402 m
- Coordinates: 41°24′53″N 096°06′32″W

Map

Runways
Direction	Length		Surface
Direction	ft	m	Surface
13/31	4,201	1,280	Concrete

Statistics (2018)
- Aircraft operations: average 42/day
- Based aircraft: 64
- Source: AirNav

Blair Executive Airport (ICAO: KBTA, FAA LID: BTA), formerly the Blair Municipal Airport, is about seven miles (11 km) south of Blair, Nebraska, a city in Washington County, Nebraska.

== History ==
The original Blair Municipal Airport (FAA LID: NE07/83Y) north of Blair opened between 1938 and 1941. In 1996 the city of Blair purchased the privately owned Eagle Airfield (FAA LID: K46) which became the site of the present Blair Municipal Airport. Eagle Airfield was renamed, and extensive construction replaced the original narrow runway, removed a grass cross-runway, and added new tarmacs and hangars. The original airport location was demolished and turned into a golf course by 1999.

The Omaha Police Department's Air Support Unit began operating out of the airport in June 2019, moving from the North Omaha Airport.

The airport's official description was changed from 'municipal' to 'executive' by the Blair Airport Authority in 2022 for marketing purposes.

== Facilities ==
The airport is at an elevation of 1,317.6 ft (401.6 m). It has one concrete runway: 13/31 is 4,201 by 100 feet (1,280 by 30 m), as well as a grass strip for glider operations. The airport had an average of 42 operations per day in the year ending May 2018. 64 aircraft were then based at this airport.

== Accidents and incidents ==
- On August 16, 2019, a Bell 206 B III, operated by the Omaha Police Department, lost power about 40 to 50 feet in the air and made a hard landing. The two pilots suffered minor injuries, but the aircraft was a loss.
- On May 13, 2017, a glider operated by a club crashed when the canopy came loose during takeoff, causing the pilot to lose control and the glider to crash. There was one fatality.

== See also ==
- List of airports in Nebraska
