= RBE (disambiguation) =

RBE is relative biological effectiveness, a health physics concept.

RBE may also refer to:

- Rock County Airport, Nebraska, United States: FAA LID code RBE
- Ratanakiri Airport, Cambodia: IATA code RBE
- Resource-Based Economy

== See also ==
- RBE2, a multirole radar developed during the 90s for the French Rafale combat aircraft
