= MIQ =

MIQ may refer to:

- MIQ (vocalist) (born 1955), Japanese pop singer and vocal trainer
- MIQ, Millard Airport (Nebraska), an airport in the United States (IATA code)
- MIQ, term used for New Zealand's COVID-19 managed isolation and quarantine
- minimal interpretation of quantum mechanics (MIQ)
- machine intelligence quotient (MIQ)
- Miq., taxonomic author abbreviation for Friedrich Anton Wilhelm Miquel, (1811–1871), Dutch botanist
