= Grant County Airport =

Grant County Airport may refer to:

- Grant County Airport (Nebraska) a public use airport in Hyannis, Nebraska, United States (FAA: 1V2)
- Grant County Airport (New Mexico) a public use airport in Silver City, New Mexico, United States (FAA/IATA: SVC)
- Grant County Airport (West Virginia) a public use airport in Petersburg, West Virginia, United States (FAA: W99, IATA: PGC)
- Grant County International Airport a public use airport in Moses Lake, Washington, United States (FAA/IATA: MWH)
- Grant County Regional Airport a public use airport in John Day, Oregon, United States (FAA: GCD, IATA: JDA)
