= KGRI =

KGRI may refer to:

- KGRI (FM), a radio station (88.1 FM) licensed to Lebanon, Oregon, United States
- KGRI (AM), a defunct daytime only radio station (1000 AM) licensed to Henderson, Texas, USA
- the ICAO code for Central Nebraska Regional Airport
