= ONL =

ONL may stand for:

- Online, as used in text messaging and academic circles
- Orange and Lemons, a Filipino band
- Order of Newfoundland and Labrador, a title
- Outer nuclear layer, a layer of the retina
- Oosterhuis Lénárd architecture office by Kas Oosterhuis
- Opening Night Live
- O'Neill Municipal Airport
