= GGF =

GGF may refer to:

- Almeirim Airport in Pará, Brazil (IATA airport code GGF)
- Georgian Cargo Airlines Africa, a defunct Senegalese airline
- Global Gaming Factory X, a defunct Swedish advertising and software company
- Global Grid Forum
- Golden Gate Fields
- Grant Municipal Airport in Nebraska (FAA airport code GGF)
