= KOFK =

KOFK may refer to:

- the ICAO code for Karl Stefan Memorial Airport, in Norfolk, Nebraska, United States
- KOFK-FM, a radio station (88.1 FM) licensed to serve Bozeman, Montana, United States\
