= AUH =

AUH or AuH may refer to:

- Zayed International Airport (IATA airport code: AUH), United Arab Emirates
- Aurora Municipal Airport (Nebraska) (FAA airport code: AUH), United States
- Universal allocation per child (Spanish: Asignación Universal por Hijo), a social welfare program in Argentina
- AUH (gene)
- Aarhus University Hospital, Denmark
