= JYR =

JYR may refer to:

- Jiroft Airport, in Iran (IATA airport code)
- York Municipal Airport, in Nebraska, United States (FAA Location Identifier (LID))
