= Andringitra =

Andringitra may refer to:

- Andringitra, region in Madagascaar
  - Andringitra Massif
  - Andringitra National Park
- Andringitra (plant), a genus of flowering plants in the family Malvaceae. The genus is native to Madagascar
