= KLXN =

KLXN may refer to:

- Jim Kelly Field (ICAO code KLXN)
- KLXN (FM), a radio station (104.1 FM) licensed to serve Rosepine, Louisiana, United States
