= Imperial Municipal Airport =

- IATA: IML; ICAO: KIML; FAA LID: IML

Summary
- Airport type: Public
- Owner: Imperial Airport Authority
- Serves: Imperial, Nebraska
- Elevation AMSL: 3,276 ft (999 m)
- Coordinates: 40°30′37.1744″N 101°37′12.525″W
- Interactive map of Imperial Municipal Airport

Runways
Direction	Length		Surface
Direction	ft	m	Surface
13/31	5,022	1,531	Concrete
3/21	2,756	840	Turf
- Source: Federal Aviation Administration

Imperial Municipal Airport (IATA: IML, ICAO: KIML, FAA LID: IML) is a public-use airport located in the town of Imperial, Nebraska. The National Plan of Integrated Airport Systems for 2011–2015 categorized it as a general aviation facility. The airport currently has no scheduled commercial air service, with the nearest such airport being McCook Ben Nelson Regional Airport, 60 mi (97 km) away.

== Facilities ==
The airport is located at an elevation of approximately 3,276 ft (999 m). It has two runways: 13/31, which is 5022 x 100 ft. (1531 x 30 m), and 3/21, which is 2756 x 280 ft. (840 x 85 m). The airport has no control tower.
