= Eppley Airfield =

Airport in Omaha, Nebraska, United States

- The OMA logo, styled after the Dance of the Cranes statue situated on the airport grounds

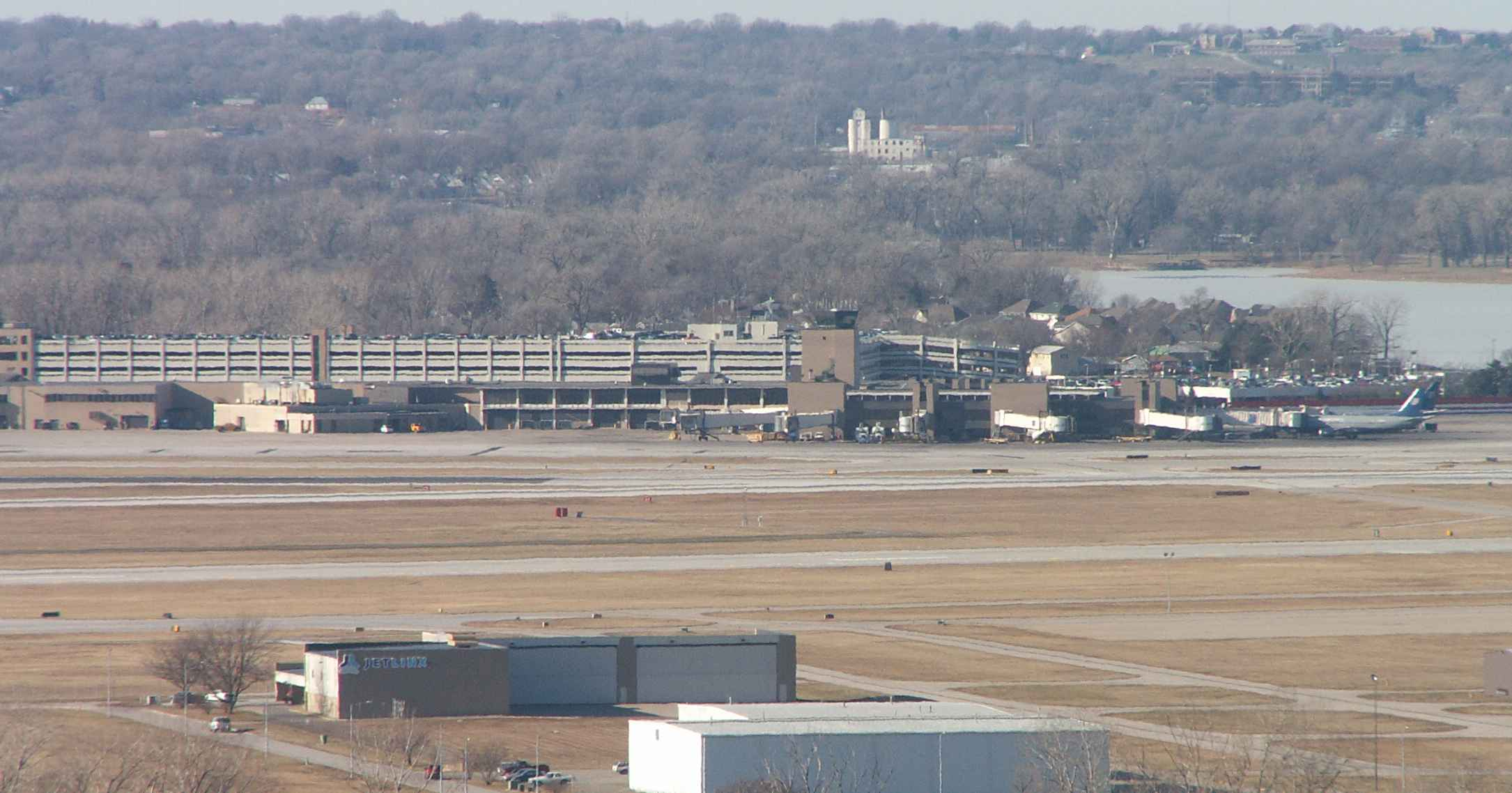
- Eppley Airfield in December 2006
- IATA: OMA; ICAO: KOMA; FAA LID: OMA

Summary
- Owner/Operator: Omaha Airport Authority
- Serves: Eastern Nebraska and Western Iowa
- Location: 4501 Abbott Drive; Omaha, Nebraska, U.S.
- Elevation AMSL: 984 ft (300 m)
- Coordinates: 41.30°N 95.895°W
- Website: flyoma.com

Maps
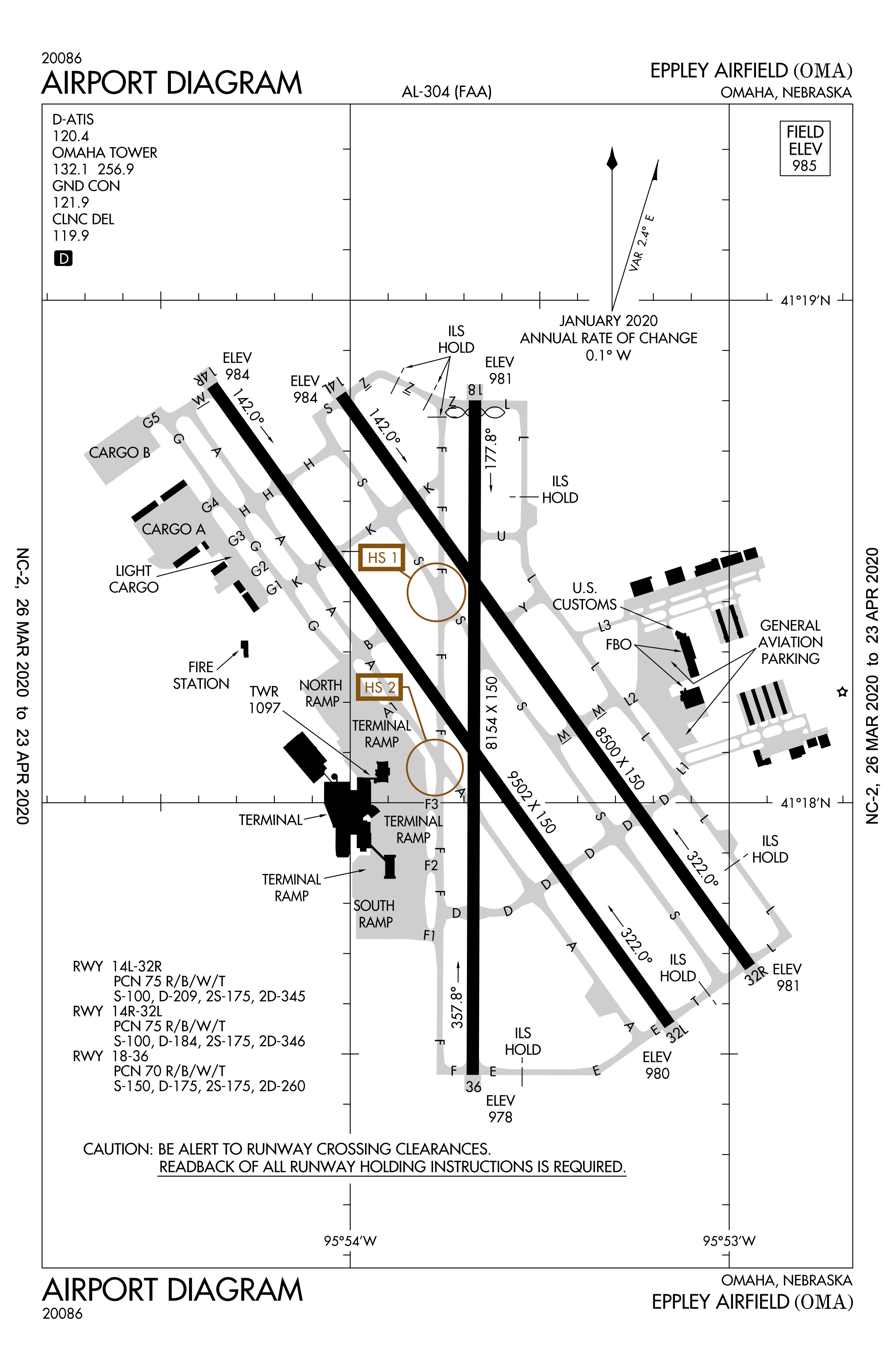
- FAA airport diagram
- Interactive map of Eppley Airfield

Runways
Direction	Length		Surface
Direction	ft	m	Surface
14R/32L	9,502	2,896	Asphalt/concrete
14L/32R	8,501	2,591	Concrete
18/36	8,154	2,485	Asphalt/concrete

Statistics (2025)
- Aircraft movements: 107,914
- Passengers: 5,225,232
- Air cargo (lbs): 143,478,681
- Sources: FAA and airport website

Eppley Airfield (IATA: OMA, ICAO: KOMA, FAA LID: OMA), also known as Omaha Airport, is an airport in the midwestern United States, located three miles (5 km) northeast of downtown Omaha, Nebraska. On the west bank of the Missouri River in Douglas County, it is the busiest airport in Nebraska, with more arrivals and departures than all other airports in the state combined. It is classified as a medium hub airport by the Federal Aviation Administration (FAA). It is owned and operated by the Omaha Airport Authority (OAA).

== Location ==
The airport is northeast of Downtown Omaha in East Omaha. Although the airport is in Nebraska on the west side of the Missouri River, it is surrounded on the east, west, north, and south by Iowa: the Missouri River formed an oxbow west of the land that became Eppley Airfield, later cutting off the oxbow during an 1877 flood and creating Carter Lake on a portion of its former course. In 1893, the Supreme Court ruled that though the lake and the surrounding land cut off by the Missouri River's changed route now lay west of the river, they remained part of Iowa. This land eventually became the city of Carter Lake, Iowa. Due to this quirk, people traveling to the airport from areas other than North Omaha pass through Carter Lake. This can confuse people from outside the area when they see "Welcome to Iowa" signs on the way to the airport.

== History ==
Eppley Airfield began as an extension of Levi Carter Park in 1925. That year, the City of Omaha acquired 200 acres (0.8 km^{2}) of cleared land on the east side of Carter Lake. Almost immediately, planes started landing and taking off there. A lawsuit was filed against the city in 1927 when a group wanted to build a hangar there. The lawsuit failed, and the land was called both the Omaha Municipal Airport and the American Legion Airport.

The April 1957 Official Airline Guide shows 42 scheduled airline departures per day, with 23 by United Airlines and 19 by Braniff International Airways. In 1960, the airport was named for Eugene C. Eppley, founder of the Eppley Hotel chain, whose estate gave the city a $1 million grant, matched by the federal government, to ready the then-Omaha Municipal Airport for jet aircraft. The first jets to land in Omaha were United Boeing 720s in August 1960.

The original terminal building opened in 1961 was designed by James C. Buckley, Inc. Concourse B opened in 1970, and was remodeled when Concourse A opened in 1986.

In 2024, Eppley Airfield set an all-time record with 5,277,326 passengers served.

=== Omaha Airport Authority ===
Created in 1959, the Omaha Airport Authority is governed by a five-member, appointed board and is responsible for sole jurisdiction and operation of Eppley Airfield.

=== Hubs and operations ===
Midwest Airlines, then known as Midwest Express Airlines, operated a hub at Eppley Airfield from 1995 to 2002 with flights to Milwaukee, Newark, Kansas City, Los Angeles, Orlando, San Diego, and Washington, D.C.; the airport remained a focus city with nonstop flights to Milwaukee and Washington, D.C. until the airline merged with Frontier Airlines in 2009.

Over the course of 2024, Southwest Airlines, American, and Delta were the largest carriers and served 37.1, 20.6, and 17.5 percent of passengers, respectively.

The airport has an on-site U.S. Customs and Border Protection (CBP) facility for international, charter, and private flights. Eppley's first commercial, international flight began May 1, 2018, when Air Canada Express launched a daily flight to Toronto Pearson International Airport; this service ended on October 4, 2019.

== Facilities ==
Eppley Airfield covers 2,650 acres (4.1 mi^{2}; 10.7 km^{2}) at an elevation of 984 feet (300 m) above sea level. The airfield has three runways. Runway 14R/32L is 9,502 by 150 feet (2,896 by 46 m), runway 14L/32R is 8,501 by 150 feet (2,591 by 46 m), and runway 18/36 is 8,154 by 150 feet (2,485 by 46 m).

=== Terminals ===
The South Terminal, including Concourse A, includes gates A1 through A10, baggage claims 1 and 2, and serves Alaska Airlines, Allegiant Air,, American Airlines, Delta Airlines, and Frontier Airlines. Gate assignments: Alaska Airlines (A9), American (A6-A8, A10), Delta (A2-A5), and Frontier (A1).

The North Terminal, including Concourse B, includes gates B11 through B19, baggage claims 5 and 6, and serves Southwest Airlines and United Airlines. Gate assignments: Southwest (B16-B19), and United (B11-B15). Gate B20 has been removed due to construction related to the airport's BuildOMA Terminal Modernization Project.

=== Ground transportation ===
The airport is near four major highways: Interstate 80, Interstate 480, Interstate 680, and Interstate 29.

The airport has a consolidated rental car facility connected to the North Terminal.

Metro Transit Line 106 provides limited weekday-only rush-hour service southbound toward downtown and northbound toward the North Omaha Transit Center. Express Arrow intercity buses to Norfolk stop at the terminal. Passenger access is located directly outside the terminal.

=== Flight training ===
Eppley Airfield is home to the Nebraska Flight Center which was founded in 2003. The flight school operated at the North Omaha and Blair airports until the Nebraska Flight Center began operations at Eppley Airfield in 2014. Currently, the flight school is based at the Signature Flight Support building on the general aviation side of the airfield and has a partnership program with Iowa Western Community College.

== Expansion ==
In January 2016, Eppley Airfield completed expansion of its CBP screening area to provide greater customs and inspection services for international passengers. Eppley Airfield is classified as a "Customs Landing Rights Airport" for international flights by CBP. Despite currently not having any international passenger flights scheduled, the airport handles international cargo, charter, and private flights.

Extensive upgrades are planned for Eppley Airfield to modernize the terminal, add gates and facilities, and improve the passenger experience. In January 2024, the Omaha Airport Authority announced plans for a $950 million expansion project, details of which included some upgrades which had been previously announced and on which construction is ongoing or soon to begin. New passenger drop-off lanes, a protective canopy over the passenger pick-up and drop-off area, and improved ADA-compliant accessibility modifications to this area were completed in August 2025; passenger pick-up and drop-off and lanes for buses, shuttles, and taxis will remain temporarily shifted to a portion of the first floor of the South parking garage to enable continuing construction on the new terminal entrance and central hall.

The southern Concourse A and northern Concourse B will be eliminated by being joined by a large 646,000-square-foot central hall with a consolidated nine-lane passenger security screening area. This will nearly double the existing terminal area of 375,000 square feet and eliminate the need for passengers to exit secured areas and be re-screened to move between concourses. The gates will be rearranged and two new gates added, for a total of twenty-two gates and the possibility of future expansion to the northwest. The baggage handling system will be modernized, space at boarding areas and baggage claims will be increased, and new retail options and concessions will be added both before and after security. Two gates will be initially devoted to international flights in a new CBP international arrivals hall. To allow for construction of the central hall, the terminal will be temporarily split into north and south sections.

By January 2026, the project had reached the halfway point, with the passenger pick-up and drop-off area and new central utility plant completed, and construction on the central hall and security checkpoints, baggage handling system, and Concourse A continuing. Work expected in 2027 is the construction of a third skyway from the parking garage to the central part of the unified concourse, remodeling of the two existing skyways, and complete demolition and rebuilding of the former Concourse B to allow for the addition of more gates as capacity demands. The first four renovated gates in the south terminal, designated A1, A1A, A1B, and A2, opened to passengers in November 2026; upon completion of the unified terminal, these gates will be numbered 12 through 15. It was also revealed that construction of the central hall was ahead of schedule with opening planned for spring 2027.

== Airlines and destinations ==
=== Passenger ===
Airlines	Destinations	Refs
Alaska Airlines	Seattle/Tacoma	
Allegiant Air	Fort Lauderdale, Las Vegas, Orlando/Sanford, Phoenix/Mesa; Seasonal: Punta Gorda (FL), Sarasota, St. Petersburg/Clearwater	
American Airlines	Charlotte, Dallas/Fort Worth, Phoenix–Sky Harbor; Seasonal: Chicago–O'Hare, Miami	
American Eagle	Chicago–O'Hare, Los Angeles, Phoenix–Sky Harbor; Seasonal: Dallas/Fort Worth, Miami, Philadelphia	
Delta Air Lines	Atlanta	
Delta Connection	Detroit, Minneapolis/St. Paul, New York–LaGuardia, Salt Lake City, Washington–National	
Frontier Airlines	Atlanta, Denver; Seasonal: Orlando, Phoenix–Sky Harbor	
Southwest Airlines	Chicago–Midway, Dallas–Love, Denver, Houston–Hobby, Las Vegas, Nashville, New York–LaGuardia, Orlando, Phoenix–Sky Harbor, San Diego, St. Louis, Washington–National; Seasonal: Austin, Fort Lauderdale, Fort Myers (begins March 13, 2027), Miami, Tampa	
United Airlines	Chicago–O'Hare, Denver, Houston–Intercontinental, San Francisco	
United Express	Chicago–O'Hare, Denver, Houston–Intercontinental, Newark	

Passenger destinations map
Domestic destinations from Eppley Airfield
Red = Year-round destination
Green = Seasonal destination
Blue = Future destination

=== Cargo ===
Airlines	Destinations	Refs
Ameriflight	Broken Bow, Grand Island, Hastings, Norfolk, O'Neill	
DHL Aviation	Cincinnati, St. Louis	

== Statistics ==
=== Top destinations ===
Busiest domestic routes from OMA (January 2025 – December 2025)
Rank	City	Passengers	Carriers
1	Denver, Colorado	375,090	Frontier, Southwest, United
2	Chicago, Illinois (O'Hare)	241,920	American, United
3	Phoenix, Arizona	213,540	American, Southwest
4	(Georgia (U.S. state)) Atlanta, Georgia	188,760	Delta
5	Dallas/Fort Worth, Texas	184,090	American
6	Chicago, Illinois (Midway)	151,950	Southwest
7	Las Vegas, Nevada	132,270	Allegiant, Southwest
8	Charlotte, North Carolina	117,080	American
9	St. Louis, Missouri	101,960	Southwest
10	Minneapolis/St. Paul, Minnesota	94,280	Delta

=== Airline market share ===
Largest airlines at OMA (June 2024 – May 2025)
Carrier	Passengers (arriving and departing)
Southwest	1,881,000(37.11%)
American	764,000(15.08%)
United	742,000(14.64%)
SkyWest	562,000(11.09%)
Delta	393,000(7.76%)
Other Airlines	726,000(14.32%)

=== Annual traffic ===
Annual passenger traffic (enplaned and deplaned) at OMA, 2000–2025
2000s			2010s			2020s		
Year	Passengers	Change	Year	Passengers	Change	Year	Passengers	Change
2000	3,814,440	▲1.08%	2010	4,287,428	▲1.65%	2020	2,140,016	▼57.4%
2001	3,653,521	▼4.21%	2011	4,212,399	▼1.75%	2021	3,749,337	▲75.2%
2002	3,608,231	▼1.23%	2012	4,127,344	▼2.02%	2022	4,506,713	▲20.2%
2003	3,667,190	▲1.63%	2013	4,042,333	▼2.06%	2023	5,026,639	▲11.5%
2004	3,868,217	▲5.48%	2014	4,119,730	▲1.91%	2024	5,277,326	▲5.0%
2005	4,193,046	▲8.40%	2015	4,169,467	▲1.21%	2025	5,225,232	▼1.0%
2006	4,229,856	▲0.88%	2016	4,349,486	▲4.32%			
2007	4,421,274	▲4.53%	2017	4,611,906	▲6.03%			
2008	4,370,137	▼1.16%	2018	5,043,194	▲9.35%			
2009	4,217,718	▼3.49%	2019	5,023,668	▼0.39%			

== Accidents and incidents ==
- On December 23, 1928, a Boeing Air Transport Boeing 40, a mail flight, crashed into a bluff near Omaha in bad weather. The pilot was seriously injured.
- On February 13, 1929, a Boeing Air Transport Boeing 95 crashed on final approach to Omaha Airport due to engine failure. The pilot was injured.
- On December 7, 1944, a USAAF Lockheed Hudson crashed during takeoff from Omaha Airport, bursting into flames. All 17 occupants, including three women, were killed.
- On December 6, 1978, a Douglas DC-6 operated by the Mexican Air Force, a military flight bound for San Antonio International Airport, suffered an engine fire on takeoff and crashed into a flood-control levee at the airport boundary half a mile north of Eppley, killing all seven occupants on board. The aircraft had been undergoing maintenance for three days and was reportedly leaking oil from one of its engines as it attempted to take off.
- On December 10, 2015, a Piper PA-46 operated by Airsea Charters struck power lines returning to Eppley because of a miscommunication with air traffic control and distraction from an anomalous flight instrument indication. The sole occupant, the pilot, was killed.
- On April 26, 2024, the airport was struck by an EF2 tornado as part of a wider outbreak in the region. Several general aviation hangars were destroyed, damaging or destroying approximately 30 airplanes. The airport briefly closed to assess the damage, but reopened shortly afterward.

== See also ==
- List of airports in Nebraska
- Millard Airport
