= Beatrice Municipal Airport =

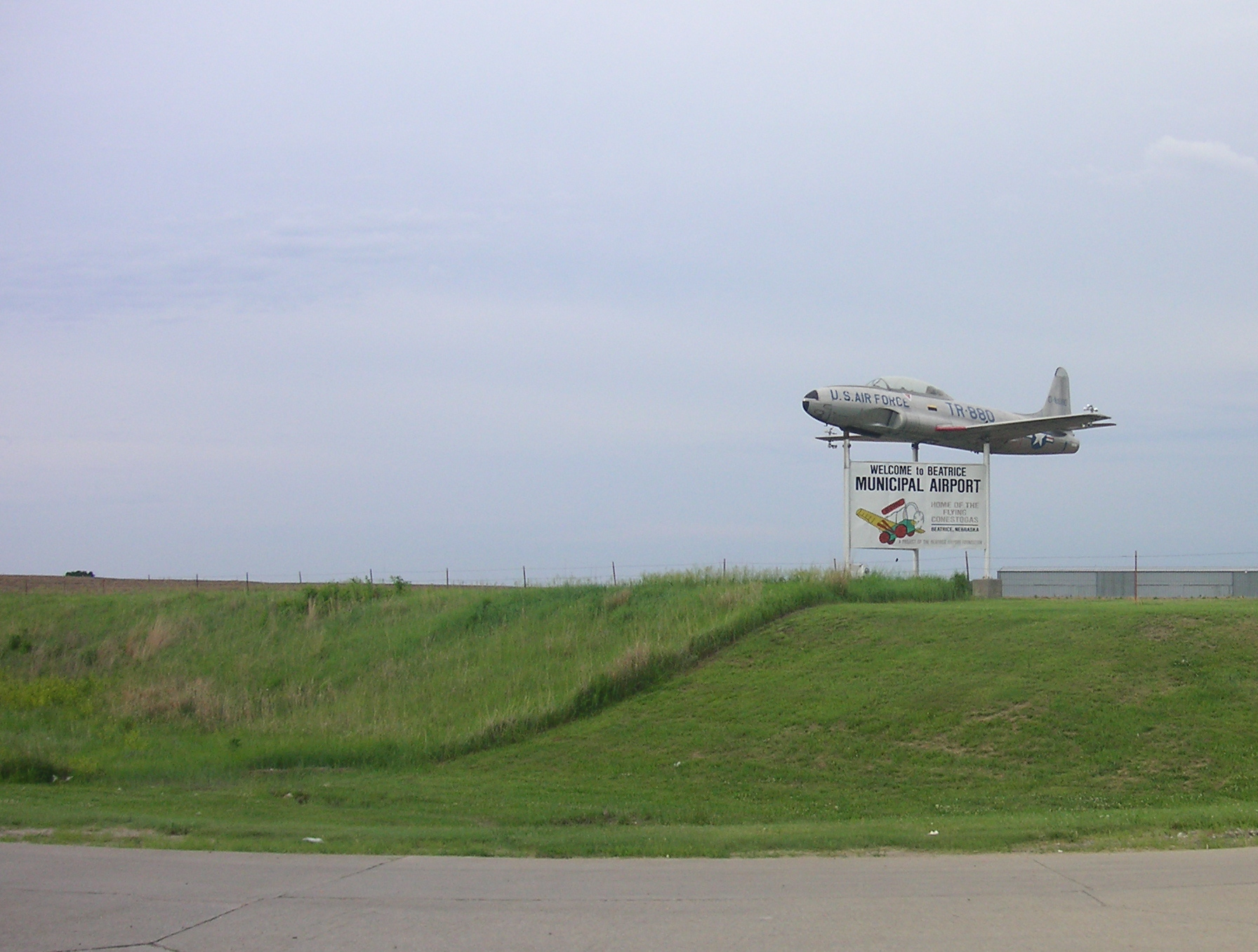
- IATA: BIE; ICAO: KBIE; FAA LID: BIE

Summary
- Airport type: Public
- Owner: Beatrice Airport Authority
- Serves: Beatrice, Nebraska
- Elevation AMSL: 1,324 ft (404 m)
- Coordinates: 40°18′04″N 096°45′14″W

Map
- Location within Nebraska Location within the United States

Runways
Direction	Length		Surface
Direction	ft	m	Surface
18/36	5,602	1,707	Concrete
14/32	4,401	1,341	Concrete

Statistics
- Aircraft operations (year ending June 21, 2023): 11,000
- Based aircraft (2023): 30
- Source: Federal Aviation Administration

Beatrice Municipal Airport (IATA: BIE, ICAO: KBIE, FAA LID: BIE) is 3 mi (4.8 km) north of Beatrice, in Gage County, Nebraska.

Frontier DC-3s stopped there from 1959 to 1963.

== Facilities ==
The airport covers 643 acres (260 ha) at an elevation of 1,324 ft (404 m). It has two concrete runways: 18/36 is 5,602 by 100 ft (1,707 by 30 m) and 14/32 is 4,401 by 75 ft (1,341 by 23 m). In the year ending June 21, 2023 the airport had 11,000 aircraft operations, an average of 30 per day: 92% general aviation, 6% air taxi and 2% military. In June 2023, 30 aircraft were based at the airport, all single-engine. The terminal has wireless internet.

== Airlines and destinations ==
=== Cargo ===
Beatrice has scheduled cargo service on Ameriflight

Airlines	Destinations
Ameriflight	Omaha

== See also ==
- List of airports in Nebraska
