= Arapahoe Municipal Airport =

- IATA: AHF; ICAO: none; FAA LID: 37V

Summary
- Airport type: Public
- Owner: Arapahoe Airport Authority
- Location: Arapahoe, Nebraska
- Elevation AMSL: 2,270 ft (690 m)
- Coordinates: 40°20′22″N 099°54′23″W
- Interactive map of Arapahoe Municipal Airport

Runways
Direction	Length		Surface
Direction	ft	m	Surface
15/33	3,000	914	Asphalt

Statistics (2005)
- Aircraft operations: 2,250
- Source: Federal Aviation Administration

Arapahoe Municipal Airport (IATA: AHF, FAA LID: 37V) is a public airport located two miles (3.2 km) north of the central business district of Arapahoe, a city in Furnas County, Nebraska, United States. It is owned by the Arapahoe Airport Authority.

== Facilities and aircraft ==
Arapahoe Municipal Airport covers an area of 50 acres (20 ha) which contains one asphalt paved runway (15/33) measuring 3,000 ft × 50 ft (914 m × 15 m). For the 12-month period ending August 2, 2005, the airport had 2,250 aircraft operations, all of which were general aviation.

== See also ==
- List of airports in Nebraska
