= Cambridge Municipal Airport (Nebraska) =

- IATA: none; ICAO: KCSB; FAA LID: CSB

Summary
- Airport type: Public
- Owner: Cambridge Airport Authority
- Serves: Cambridge, Nebraska
- Elevation AMSL: 2,414 ft (736 m)
- Coordinates: 40°18′24″N 100°09′44″W

Map
- Location of airport in Nebraska / United States CSB (the United States)

Runways
Direction	Length		Surface
Direction	ft	m	Surface
14/32	4,098	1,249	Asphalt

Statistics (2009)
- Aircraft operations: 7,000
- Based aircraft: 7
- Source: Federal Aviation Administration

Cambridge Municipal Airport (ICAO: KCSB, FAA LID: CSB) is two miles northeast of Cambridge, in Furnas County, Nebraska. The FAA's National Plan of Integrated Airport Systems for 2011–2015 called it a general aviation facility.

Many U.S. airports use the same three-letter location identifier for the FAA and IATA, but Cambridge has FAA code CSB and has no IATA code. (Caransebeș Airport in Caransebeş, Romania has IATA code CSB.)

== Facilities ==
The airport covers 213 acres (86 ha) at an elevation of 2,414 feet (736 m). Its one runway, 14/32, is 4,098 by 60 feet (1,249 x 18 m) asphalt.

In the year ending June 29, 2009 the airport had 7,000 aircraft operations, average 19 per day: 96% general aviation, 2% air taxi, and 1% military. Seven aircraft were then based at the airport: five single-engine and two multi-engine.

== See also ==
- List of airports in Nebraska
