= Martin Field (Nebraska) =

- IATA: none; ICAO: none; FAA LID: 7K8

Summary
- Airport type: Public use
- Owner: T/M Holding Limited
- Serves: South Sioux City, Nebraska
- Elevation AMSL: 1,100 ft / 335 m
- Coordinates: 42°27′15″N 096°28′21″W

Map
- Location of airport in Nebraska

Runways
| Direction | Length | | Surface |
| Direction | ft | m | Surface |
|---|---|---|---|
| 14/32 | 3,323 | 1,013 | Asphalt |

Statistics (2011)
- Aircraft operations: 10,550
- Based aircraft: 36
- Source: Federal Aviation Administration

Martin Field (FAA LID: 7K8) is a privately owned, public use airport located three nautical miles (6 km) southwest of the central business district of South Sioux City, in Dakota County, Nebraska, United States.

== Facilities and aircraft ==
Now Closed

Martin Field covers an area of 175 acres (71 ha) at an elevation of 1,100 feet (335 m) above mean sea level. It has one runway designated 14/32 with an asphalt surface measuring 3,323 by 50 feet (1,013 x 15 m).

For the 12-month period ending June 8, 2011, the airport had 10,550 aircraft operations, an average of 28 per day: 99% general aviation and 1% military. At that time there were 36 aircraft based at this airport: 97% single-engine and 3% glider.

== See also ==
- List of airports in Nebraska
