= Omaha Airport Authority =

Government agency

- Abbreviation: OAA
- Formation: 1959; 67 years ago
- Type: Airport Authority
- Headquarters: Eppley Airfield main terminal
- Region served: Omaha, NE
- Executive Director: Dave Roth
- Website: www.flyoma.com/omaha-airport-authority/

The Omaha Airport Authority is the organization charged with management of Omaha Eppley Airfield and Millard Airport in Omaha, Nebraska. It is overseen by a five-person Board of Directors, members of which are appointed by the Mayor of Omaha.

== Airport Police ==
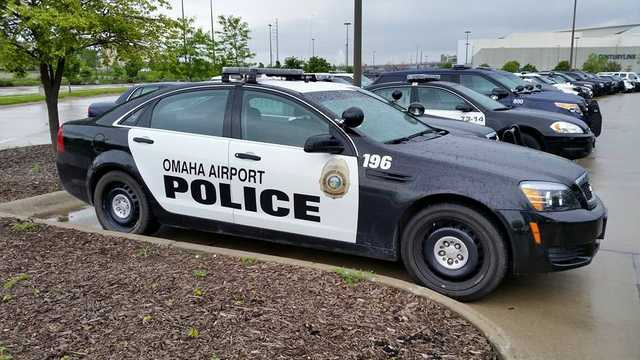
Omaha Airport Police cruiser

The airport authority has its own police department. The department is independent from, but co-jurisdictional with the Omaha Police Department. As of October 2020, the Chief is Tim Conahan.
