= Harlan County Lake Seaplane Base =

- IATA: none; ICAO: none; FAA LID: H63

Summary
- Airport type: Public
- Owner: U.S. Army Corps of Engineers
- Serves: Alma, Nebraska
- Elevation AMSL: 1,946 ft (593 m)
- Coordinates: 40°02′35″N 099°15′03″W
- Interactive map of Harlan County Lake Seaplane Base

Runways
Direction	Length		Surface
Direction	ft	m	Surface
E/W	15,000	4,572	Water
- Source: Federal Aviation Administration

Harlan County Lake Seaplane Base (FAA LID: H63) is a public use seaplane base located six nautical miles (11 km) southwest of the central business district of Alma, a city in Harlan County, Nebraska, United States. It is owned by the U.S. Army Corps of Engineers.

== Facilities and aircraft ==
Harlan County Lake Seaplane Base has one seaplane landing area designated E/W which measures 15,000 x 4,000 ft (4,572 x 1,219 m).

== See also ==
- List of airports in Nebraska
