= Fremont Municipal Airport (Nebraska) =

Airport in Nebraska, United States of America

- IATA: FET; ICAO: KFET; FAA LID: FET

Summary
- Airport type: Public
- Owner: City of Fremont
- Serves: Fremont, Nebraska
- Elevation AMSL: 1,204 ft (367 m)
- Coordinates: 41°26′57″N 096°31′13″W
- Interactive map of Fremont Municipal Airport

Runways
Direction	Length		Surface
Direction	ft	m	Surface
14/32	6,353	1,936	Concrete

Statistics (2020)
- Aircraft operations (year ending April 1, 2020): 22,250
- Based aircraft: 44
- Source: Federal Aviation Administration

Fremont Municipal Airport (IATA: FET, ICAO: KFET, FAA LID: FET) is two miles northwest of Fremont, in Dodge County, Nebraska. The FAA's National Plan of Integrated Airport Systems for 2009-2013 classified it as a general aviation airport.

== Facilities ==
The airport covers 639 acres (259 ha) at an elevation of 1,204 feet (367 m). It has one runway: 14/32 is 6,353 by 100 feet (1,936 x 30 m) asphalt/concrete.

In the year ending April 1, 2020 the airport had 22,500 aircraft operations, average 61 per day: 84% general aviation, 16% air taxi and <1% military. 44 aircraft were then based at the airport: 37 single-engine, 4 multi-engine, and 3 helicopter.

== See also ==
- List of airports in Nebraska
