= Columbus Municipal Airport (Nebraska) =

Airport in Platte County, Nebraska, US

Coordinates: 41°26′53″N 097°20′34″W

- IATA: OLU; ICAO: KOLU; FAA LID: OLU

Summary
- Airport type: Public
- Owner: Columbus Airport Authority
- Serves: Columbus, Nebraska
- Elevation AMSL: 1,447 ft (441 m)
- Interactive map of Columbus Municipal Airport

Runways
Direction	Length		Surface
Direction	ft	m	Surface
14/32	6,801	2,073	Concrete
2/20	4,135	1,260	Turf

Statistics (2023)
- Aircraft operations (year ending 7/26/2023): 8,000
- Source: Federal Aviation Administration

Columbus Municipal Airport (IATA: OLU, ICAO: KOLU, FAA LID: OLU) is a mile (2 km) northeast of Columbus, in Platte County, Nebraska. It is owned by the Columbus Airport Authority; it has 100LL and JetA fuel for sale.

The first airline flights were Mid-West Airlines Cessna 190s in 1950–51. Frontier DC-3s arrived in 1965; its last Convair 580 left in 1979.

== Facilities ==
The airport covers 602 acres (244 ha), and has two runways: 14/32 is 6,801 x 100 ft (2,073 x 30 m) concrete and 2/20 is 4,135 x 150 ft (1,260 x 46 m) turf.

In the year ending July 26, 2023, the airport had 8,000 aircraft operations, average 22 per day: 96% general aviation, 2% air taxi and <1% military.

== See also ==
- List of airports in Nebraska
