= Nebraska City Municipal Airport =

- IATA: none; ICAO: KAFK; FAA LID: AFK

Summary
- Airport type: Public
- Owner: Nebraska City Airport Authority
- Serves: Nebraska City, Nebraska
- Elevation AMSL: 1,165 ft / 355 m
- Coordinates: 40°36′20″N 095°52′04″W

Map
- Location of airport in Nebraska AFK (the United States)

Runways
Direction	Length		Surface
Direction	ft	m	Surface
15/33	4,501	1,372	Concrete
5/23	2,550	777	Turf

Statistics (2023)
- Aircraft operations (year ending 4/18/2023): 4,430
- Source: Federal Aviation Administration

Nebraska City Municipal Airport (ICAO: KAFK, FAA LID: AFK) is four miles south of Nebraska City, in Otoe County, Nebraska.

The airport was built as a replacement for Grundman Field and opened in 1994. Located inside the city limits Grundman Field could not lengthen the runway to allow business jets. In 1974 when then Mayor A. O. Gigstard created the airport authority to build Nebraska City Municipal the voters had him recalled and removed from office. He returned as mayor in 1980 as a write-in candidate. Later the new airport was approved by the voters as a bond measure.

Most U.S. airports use the same three-letter location identifier for the FAA and IATA, but Nebraska City Municipal is AFK to the FAA and has no IATA code.

== Facilities ==
The airport covers 215 acres (87 ha) and has two runways: 15/33 is 4,501 x 75 ft (1,372 x 23 m) concrete and 5/23 is 2,550 x 151 ft (777 x 46 m) turf. In the year ending April 18, 2023, the airport had 4,430 aircraft operations, average 85 per week: 93% general aviation and 7% military.

== See also ==
- List of airports in Nebraska
