= Wahoo Municipal Airport =

- IATA: none; ICAO: KAHQ; FAA LID: AHQ

Summary
- Airport type: Public
- Owner: Wahoo Airport Authority
- Serves: Wahoo, Nebraska
- Elevation AMSL: 1,224 ft / 373 m
- Coordinates: 41°14′26″N 096°35′40″W
- Interactive map of Wahoo Municipal Airport

Runways
Direction	Length		Surface
Direction	ft	m	Surface
2/20	4,100	1,250	Concrete
13/31	3,290	1,003	Turf

Statistics (2019)
- Aircraft operations (year ending 7/10/2019): 16,350
- Based aircraft: 45
- Source: Federal Aviation Administration

Wahoo Municipal Airport (ICAO: KAHQ, FAA LID: AHQ) is two miles northeast of Wahoo, in Saunders County, Nebraska. It is owned by the Wahoo Airport Authority. The FAA's National Plan of Integrated Airport Systems for 2009–2013 classified it as a general aviation airport.

Many U.S. airports use the same three-letter location identifier for the FAA and IATA, but this airport is AHQ to the FAA and has no IATA code.

== Facilities ==
The airport covers 126 acres (51 ha) at an elevation of 1,224 feet (373 m). It has two runways: 2/20 is 4,100 by 75 feet (1,250 x 23 m) concrete and 13/31 is 3,290 by 150 feet (1,003 x 46 m) turf.

In the year ending July 10, 2019, the airport had 16,350 aircraft operations, average 45 per day: 99% general aviation and 1% military. 34 aircraft were then based at the airport: 30 single-engine, 2 multi-engine, 1 jet, and 1 helicopter.

== See also ==
- List of airports in Nebraska
