= Miller Field (airport) =

Airport in Nebraska, United States

- IATA: VTN; ICAO: KVTN; FAA LID: VTN

Summary
- Airport type: Public
- Owner: City of Valentine
- Serves: Valentine, Nebraska
- Elevation AMSL: 2,595 ft / 791 m
- Coordinates: 42°51′24″N 100°32′56″W
- Interactive map of Miller Field

Runways
Direction	Length		Surface
Direction	ft	m	Surface
14/32	4,704	1,434	Concrete
3/21	3,701	1,128	Concrete

Statistics (2020)
- Aircraft operations (year ending 6/24/2020): 4,900
- Source: Federal Aviation Administration

Miller Field (IATA: VTN, ICAO: KVTN, FAA LID: VTN) is a public airport a mile south of Valentine in Cherry County, Nebraska.

== Facilities ==
Miller Field covers 279 acres (113 ha) at an elevation of 2,595 feet (791 m). It has two runways: 14/32 is 4,704 by 75 feet (1,433 x 23 m) concrete and 3/21 is 3,701 by 60 feet (1,128 x 18 m) concrete.

In the year ending June 24, 2020 the airport had 4,900 aircraft operations, average 94 per week: 81% general aviation, 19% air taxi and <1% military.

For a year or two starting in 1959 it had airline flights-- Frontier DC-3s.

== See also ==
- List of airports in Nebraska
