= Bolsa de Valores de Nicaragua =

Bolsa de Valores de Nicaragua (Stock Exchange of Nicaragua, or BVN) was created in 1994 and is the only stock exchange operating in Nicaragua.

== Background ==
The exchange is the result of private sector initiatives encouraging the country's market liberalization programmes, which began in 1990. Trading operations officially began on January 31, 1994, and as of 2006 BVN is the only organized stock exchange existing in the country. The institution is a private joint-stock company, founded by most of the private and state run banks, and by representatives of enterprising groups from various business sectors.

BVN offers domestic investors and foreign shareholders a platform to conduct operations within the framework of an open market economy. The main characteristics of this market are the following: (1) Fixed income financial instruments in U.S. dollars and local currency indices; (2) A total exemption of income and capital gains taxes for traded securities; (3) No restrictions on foreign direct investment (FDI); (4) An effective regulatory frame.

== Legal Framework ==
Bolsa de Valores de Nicaragua is supervised by the Superintendencia de Bancos y Otras Instituciones Financieras (Supervision of Banks and Other Financial Institutions). This institution supervises trading activity, market positions, as well as stock brokers, banks, insurance companies and issuers of securities.

The specific regulatory frame of exchange activity is conformed by Presidential Decree 33-93 or Reglamento General sobre Bolsas de Valores (General Stock Market Regulations). The president of the exchange as of 2023 is Dr. Raúl A. Lacayo Solórzano.
