= Lawrence Regional Airport =

Regional airport located in Douglas County Kansas

- IATA: LWC; ICAO: KLWC; FAA LID: LWC

Summary
- Airport type: Public
- Owner: City of Lawrence
- Serves: Lawrence, Kansas
- Elevation AMSL: 833 ft / 254 m
- Coordinates: 39°00′40″N 095°12′59″W

Map
- Location of airport in Kansas LWC (the United States)

Runways
Direction	Length		Surface
Direction	ft	m	Surface
15/33	5,700	1,737	Asphalt
1/19	3,901	1,189	Concrete

Statistics (2008)
- Aircraft operations: 32,700
- Based aircraft: 56
- Source: Federal Aviation Administration

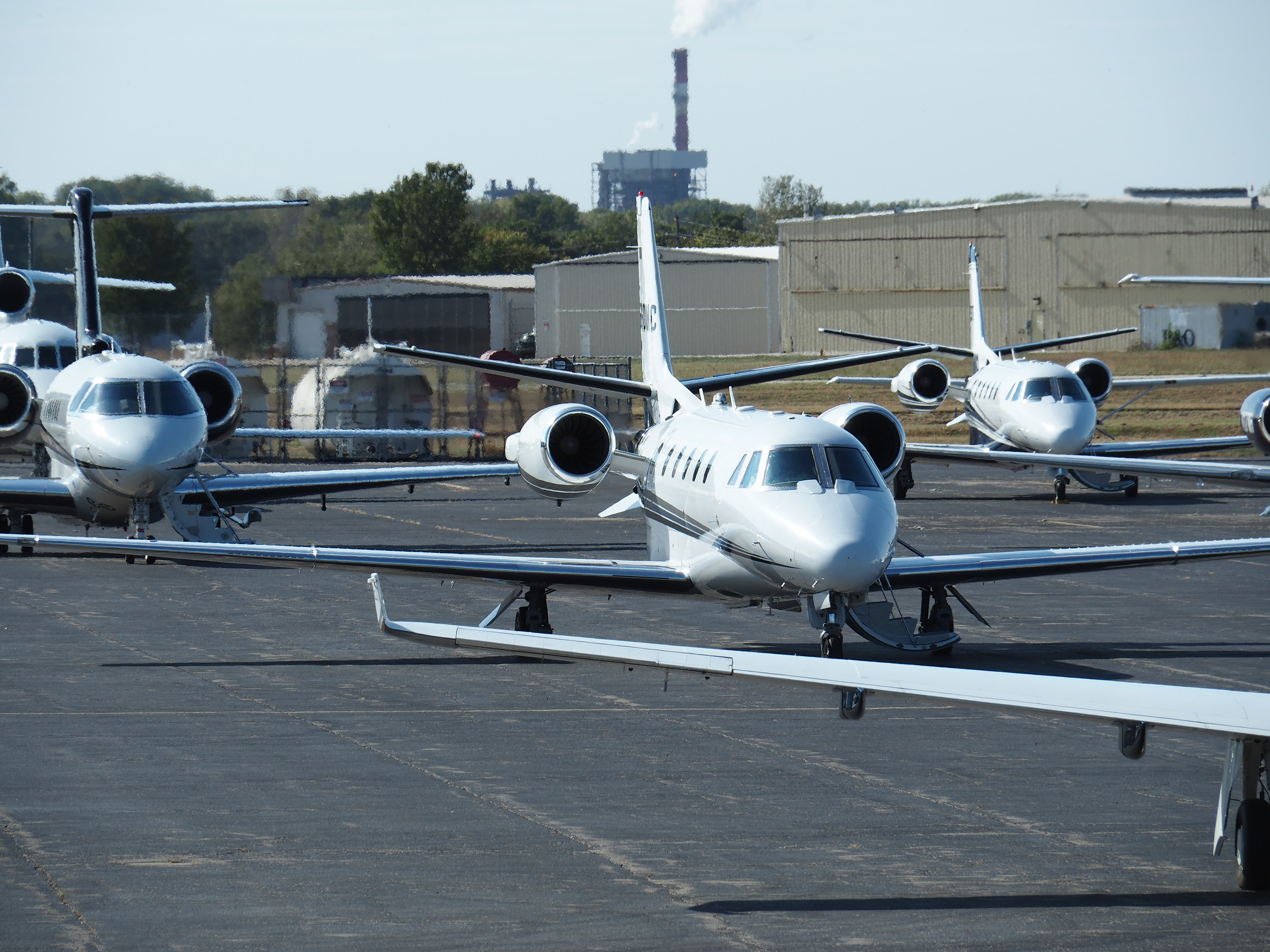
Business Jets, parked on the ramp at LWC, Oct. 2022

Lawrence Regional Airport (IATA: LWC, ICAO: KLWC, FAA LID: LWC) is an airport in Lawrence, in Douglas County, Kansas. 3 miles (4.8 km) north of central Lawrence, it is used for general aviation and air taxi.

== Facilities ==
The airport covers 486 acres (197 ha) at an elevation of 833 feet (254 m). Runway 15/33 is 5,700 by 100 feet (1,737 x 30 m) asphalt and 1/19 is 3,901 by 75 feet (1,189 x 23 m) concrete.

In the year ending August 30, 2018 the airport had 23,000 aircraft operations with an average 63 per day: 93% general aviation, 6% air taxi and <1% military. 40 aircraft were based at the airport: 72.5% single-engine (29), 12.5% multi-engine (5), 7.5% jet (3) and 7.5% helicopter (3).

In July 2019, the City of Lawrence granted permits to a $2.1 million construction project. The project, expected to be completed by the end of 2019, includes a 23,000 square foot hangar and an office space. It is designed in order to encourage more private charters out of the airport.

In February 2023, the airport was selected to receive Kansas Airport Improvement Program (KAIP) funding of more than $1.3 million for airport master plan updates, apron rehabilitation – including design and construction – and a feasibility study for a runway expansion and extension to support 717 and 737 aircraft.

== See also ==
- List of airports in Kansas
