= North Omaha Airport =

Private airport north of Omaha, Nebraska

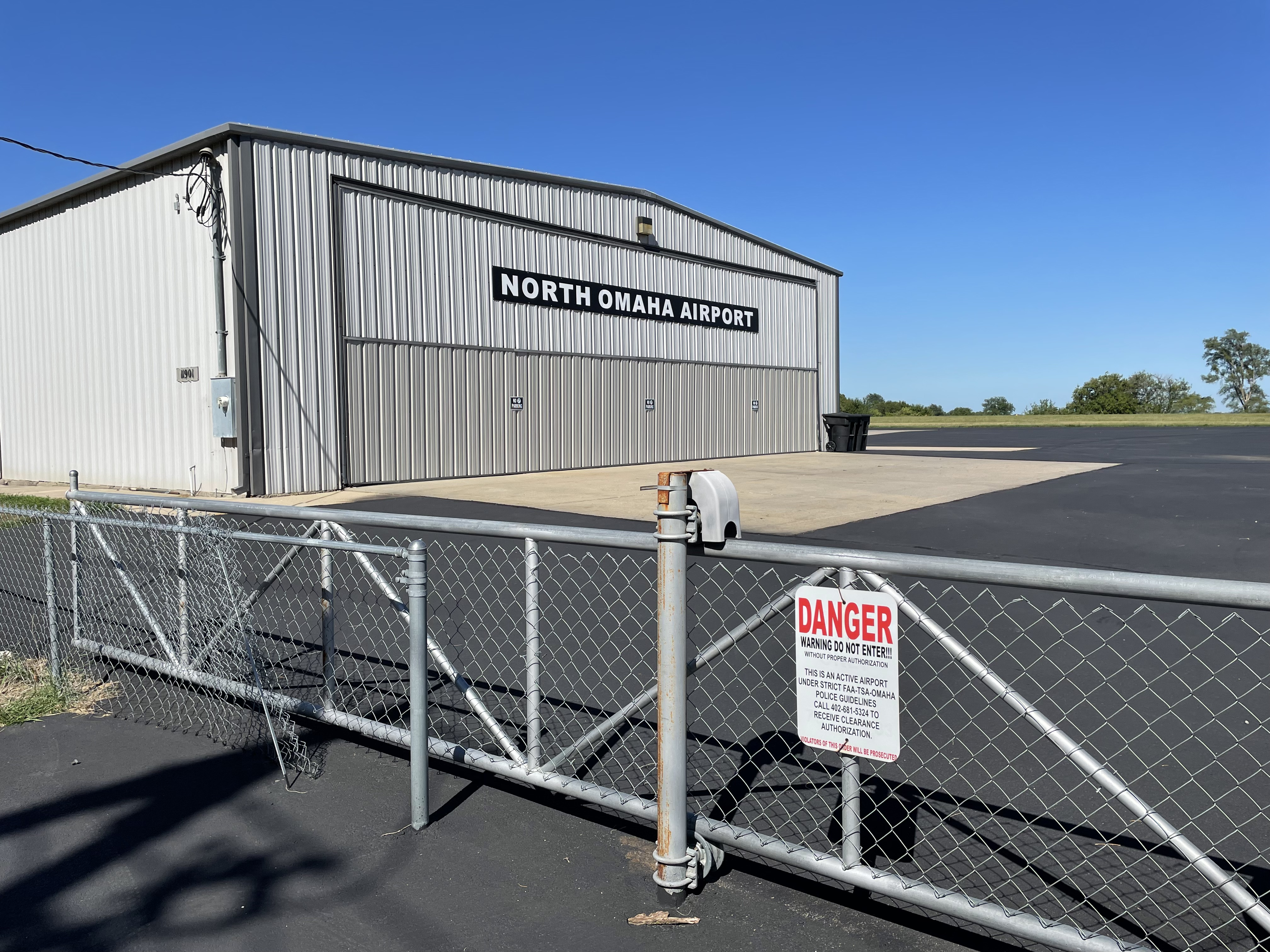
- Airport main gate in 2022
- IATA: none; ICAO: none; FAA LID: 91NE

Summary
- Airport type: Private use
- Owner: Pat Ackerman
- Serves: Omaha, Nebraska
- Elevation AMSL: 1,324 ft / 404 m
- Coordinates: 41°22′06″N 096°01′21″W
- Interactive map of North Omaha Airport

Runways
Direction	Length		Surface
Direction	ft	m	Surface
17/35	3,173	967	Concrete

Statistics (2008)
- Aircraft operations: 14,250
- Based aircraft: 58
- Source: Federal Aviation Administration

North Omaha Airport (FAA LID: 3NO) is a privately owned, public-use airport eight miles northwest of Omaha, in Douglas County, Nebraska.

== Facilities ==
North Omaha Airport covers 100 acres (40 ha) at an elevation of 1,324 feet (404 m). Its one runway, 17/35, is 3,173 by 40 feet (967 x 12 m) concrete.

In the year ending August 29, 2018 the airport had 14,250 general aviation aircraft operations, average 39 per day. 57 aircraft were then based at the airport: 87% single-engine and 13% helicopter.

The Omaha Police Department's air support unit was based at the airport from 1997–2019, before moving to Blair Municipal Airport in Blair, Nebraska, north of Omaha.

== See also ==
- List of airports in Nebraska
