= Rock County Airport =

- IATA: none; ICAO: KRBE; FAA LID: RBE

Summary
- Airport type: Public
- Owner: Rock County Airport Authority
- Serves: Bassett, Nebraska
- Elevation AMSL: 2,349 ft / 716 m
- Coordinates: 42°34′16″N 099°34′10″W
- Interactive map of Rock County Airport

Runways
Direction	Length		Surface
Direction	ft	m	Surface
13/31	4,698	1,432	Concrete
2/20	2,202	671	Turf

Statistics (2020)
- Aircraft operations (year ending June 25, 2020): 2,000
- Based aircraft: 9
- Source: Federal Aviation Administration

Rock County Airport (ICAO: KRBE, FAA LID: RBE) is a public use airport located two nautical miles (3.7 km) southwest of the central business district of Bassett, a city in Rock County, Nebraska, United States. It is owned by the Rock County Airport Authority. According to the FAA's National Plan of Integrated Airport Systems for 2009–2013, it is classified as a general aviation airport.

Although many U.S. airports use the same three-letter location identifier for the FAA and IATA, this airport is assigned RBE by the FAA but has no designation from the IATA (which assigned RBE to Ratanakiri Airport in Ratanakiri, Cambodia).

== Facilities and aircraft ==
Rock County Airport covers an area of 228 acres (92 ha) at an elevation of 2,349 feet (716 m) above mean sea level. It has two runways: 13/31 is 4,698 by 75 feet (1,432 x 23 m) with a concrete surface and 2/20 is 2,202 by 120 feet (671 x 37 m) with a turf surface.

For the 12-month period ending June 25, 2020, the airport had 2,000 general aviation aircraft operations, an average of 38 per week. At that time there were 9 aircraft based at this airport: 100% single-engine.

== See also ==
- List of airports in Nebraska
