= Aurora Municipal Airport (Nebraska) =

Aurora Municipal Airport Al Potter Field
- IATA: none; ICAO: KAUH; FAA LID: AUH

Summary
- Airport type: Public
- Operator: Aurora Airport Authority
- Serves: Aurora, Nebraska
- Elevation AMSL: 1,804 ft (550 m)
- Coordinates: 40°53′39″N 097°59′40″W
- Website: www.cityofaurora.org

Map
- Location of airport in Nebraska / United States AUH (the United States)

Runways
Direction	Length		Surface
Direction	ft	m	Surface
16/34	4,301	1,311	Asphalt

Statistics (2021)
- Aircraft operations (year ending 7/27/2021): 20,550
- Based aircraft: 16
- Source: Federal Aviation Administration

Aurora Municipal Airport (ICAO: KAUH, FAA LID: AUH), also known as Al Potter Field, is a public airport located two miles (3 km) north of the central business district of Aurora, a city in Hamilton County, Nebraska, United States. It is owned by Aurora Airport Authority.

Although most U.S. airports use the same three-letter location identifier for the FAA and IATA, Aurora Municipal Airport is assigned AUH by the FAA but has no designation from the IATA (which assigned AUH to Abu Dhabi International Airport in the United Arab Emirates).

== Facilities ==
Aurora Municipal Airport - Al Potter Field covers an area of 171 acres (69 ha) which contains one asphalt paved runway (16/34) measuring 4,301 x 75 ft (1,311 x 23 m). For the 12-month period ending July 27, 2021, the airport had 20,550 aircraft operations, an average of 56 per day: 99% general aviation and <1% military. There was at the time 16 aircraft based at this airport: all single engine.

== See also ==
- List of airports in Nebraska
