= Grant County Airport (Nebraska) =

Airport in Nebraska, United States

- IATA: none; ICAO: none; FAA LID: 1V2

Summary
- Airport type: Public
- Owner: Grant County
- Serves: Hyannis, Nebraska
- Elevation AMSL: 3,737 ft (1,139 m)
- Coordinates: 42°00′34″N 101°46′10″W
- Interactive map of Grant County Airport

Runways
Direction	Length		Surface
Direction	ft	m	Surface
17/35	3,975	1,212	Asphalt

Statistics (2023)
- Aircraft operations (year ending 6/27/2023): 1,825
- Source: Federal Aviation Administration

Grant County Airport (FAA LID: 1V2) is a county-owned, public-use airport in Grant County, Nebraska, United States. It is located one nautical mile (2 km) northwest of the central business district of Hyannis, Nebraska. This airport is included in the National Plan of Integrated Airport Systems for 2011–2015, which categorized it as a general aviation facility.

== Facilities and aircraft ==
Grant County Airport covers an area of 88 acres (36 ha) at an elevation of 3,737 feet (1,139 m) above mean sea level. It has one runway designated 17/35 with an asphalt surface measuring 3,975 by 50 feet (1,212 x 15 m). For the 12-month period ending June 27, 2023, the airport had 1,825 general aviation aircraft operations, an average of 35 per week.

== See also ==
- List of airports in Nebraska
