= Hastings Municipal Airport =

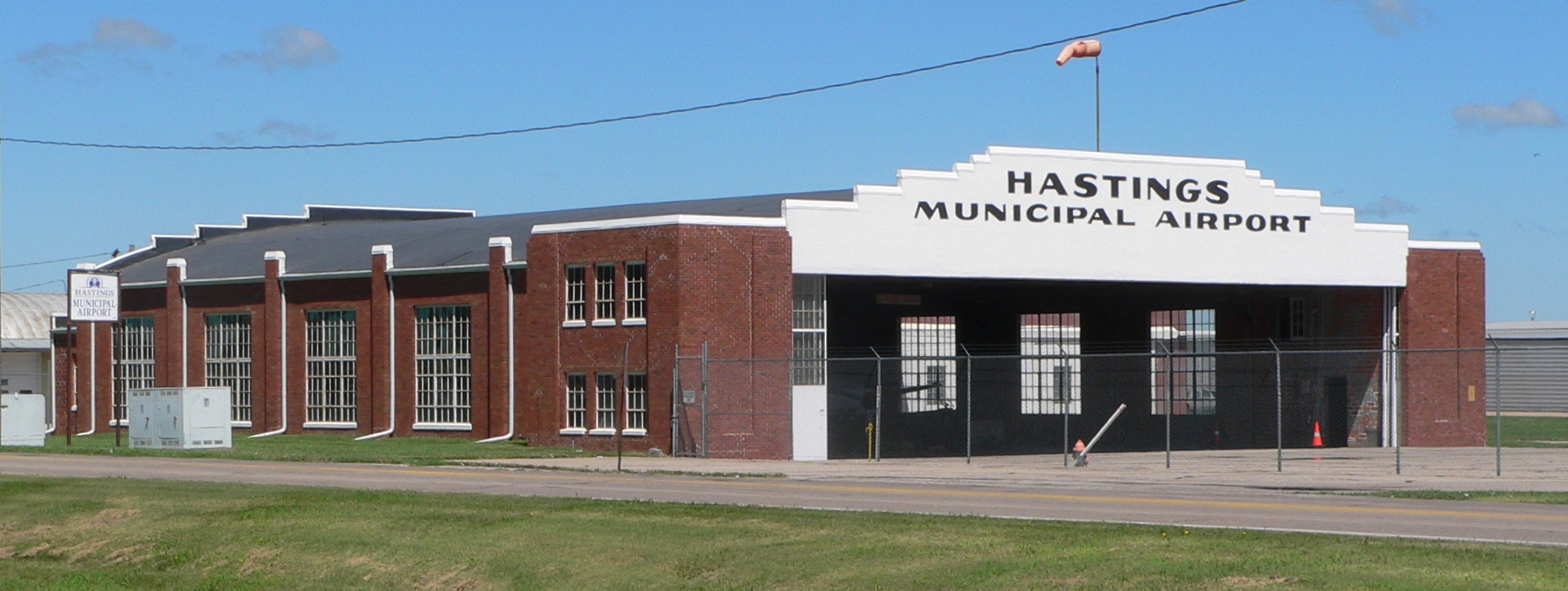
- Hangar No. 1 is listed in the National Register of Historic Places.
- IATA: HSI; ICAO: KHSI; FAA LID: HSI

Summary
- Airport type: Public
- Owner: City of Hastings
- Serves: Hastings, Nebraska
- Elevation AMSL: 1,961 ft (598 m)
- Coordinates: 40°36′19″N 098°25′40″W
- Website: cityofhastings.org/...

Map
- Location within Nebraska

Runways
Direction	Length		Surface
Direction	ft	m	Surface
4/22	4,501	1,372	Concrete
14/32	6,451	1,966	Concrete

Statistics (2022)
- Aircraft operations (year ending 4/27/2022): 22,700
- Based aircraft: 29
- Source: Federal Aviation Administration

Hastings Municipal Airport (IATA: HSI, ICAO: KHSI, FAA LID: HSI) is two miles northwest of Hastings in Adams County, Nebraska. The National Plan of Integrated Airport Systems for 2011–2015 categorized it as a "general aviation" airport.

The first airline flights were Mid-West Airlines Cessna 190s in 1950-51. Frontier DC-3s arrived in 1959 and its last Convair 580s left in 1979.

== Facilities ==
The airport covers 504 acres (204 ha) at an elevation of 1,961 feet (598 m). It has two concrete runways: 14/32 is 6,451 by 100 feet (1,966 x 30 m) and 4/22 is 4,501 by 75 feet (1,372 x 23 m).

In the year ending April 27, 2022, the airport had 22,700 aircraft operations, average 62 per day: 97% general aviation, 3% air taxi, and <1% military. 29 aircraft were then based at this airport: 25 single-engine and 4 multi-engine.

== See also ==
- List of airports in Nebraska
