= Trenton Municipal Airport (Nebraska) =

- IATA: none; ICAO: none; FAA LID: 9V2

Summary
- Airport type: Public
- Owner: Village of Trenton
- Serves: Trenton, Nebraska
- Elevation AMSL: 2,796 ft / 852 m
- Coordinates: 40°11′15″N 101°01′32″W
- Interactive map of Trenton Municipal Airport

Runways
Direction	Length		Surface
Direction	ft	m	Surface
1/19	2,260	689	Turf
14/32	2,360	719	Turf

Statistics (2007)
- Aircraft operations: 3,750
- Source: Federal Aviation Administration

Trenton Municipal Airport (FAA LID: 9V2) was a village-owned, public-use airport located one mile (2 km) northwest of the central business district of Trenton, a village in Hitchcock County, Nebraska, United States.

The airport was closed in September 2015.

== Facilities and aircraft ==
Trenton Municipal Airport covered an area of 97 acres (39 ha) which contained two runways with turf surfaces: 1/19 measuring 2,260 x 300 ft (689 x 91 m) and 14/32 measuring 2,360 x 280 ft (719 x 85 m). For the 12-month period ending September 11, 2007, the airport had 3,750 general aviation aircraft operations, an average of 10 per day.
