= Norfolk Regional Airport =

Airport in Nebraska, United States

Norfolk Regional Airport Karl Stefan Memorial Field
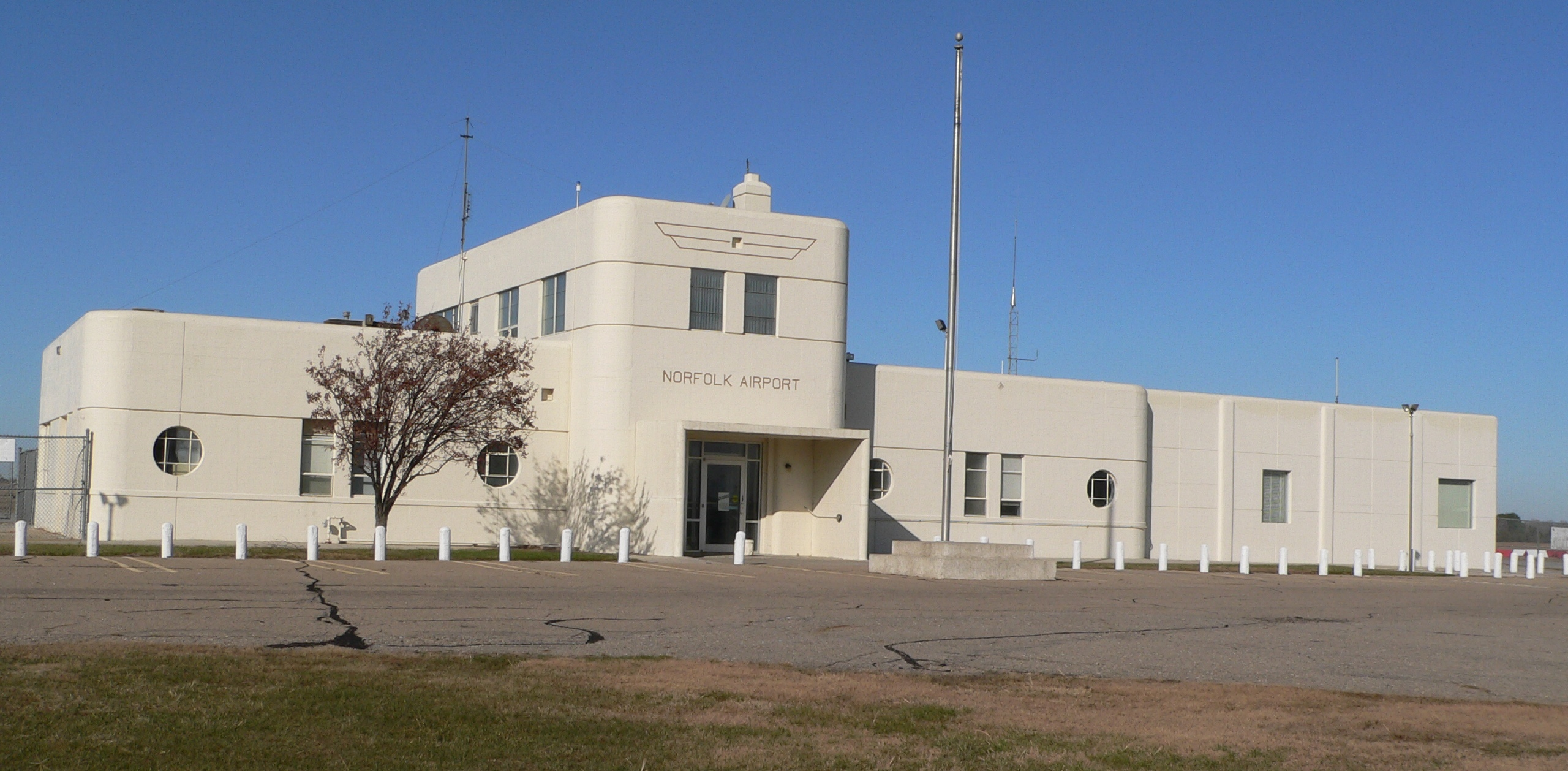
- Former terminal building
- IATA: OFK; ICAO: KOFK; FAA LID: OFK

Summary
- Airport type: Public
- Owner: City of Norfolk
- Serves: Norfolk, Nebraska
- Elevation AMSL: 1,573 ft (479 m)
- Coordinates: 41°59′08″N 097°26′06″W

Map
- Location within Nebraska Location within the United States

Runways
Direction	Length		Surface
Direction	ft	m	Surface
2/20	5,801	1,768	Asphalt
14/32	5,806	1,770	Asphalt

Statistics (2022)
- Aircraft operations (year ending 7/12/2022): 11,434
- Based aircraft: 43
- Source: Federal Aviation Administration

Norfolk Regional Airport (IATA: OFK, ICAO: KOFK, FAA LID: OFK) (Karl Stefan Memorial Field) is four miles southwest of Norfolk, in Madison County, Nebraska. The airport is named for Karl Stefan, a local newspaper editor and radio announcer who served several terms in the United States Congress. Until March 2011 it was known as Karl Stefan Memorial Airport. The FAA's National Plan of Integrated Airport Systems for 2011–2015 categorized it as a general aviation facility. Federal Aviation Administration records say Norfolk had 1,709 passenger boardings (enplanements) in calendar year 2001, 1,139 enplanments in 2002, 1,254 in 2003, and 672 in 2004.

== History ==
The first airline flights were Mid-West Airlines Cessna 190s in 1950-51. Mid-Continent or Braniff arrived by the end of 1952; North Central replaced Braniff in 1957, and successor Republic pulled out in 1982.

Airline service was subsidized by the Essential Air Service program until May 2004, when subsidies ended due to federal law not allowing a subsidy over $200 per passenger for communities within 210 miles of the nearest large or medium hub airport (Eppley Airfield, a medium hub serving Omaha, Nebraska).

== Facilities ==
Norfolk Regional Airport covers 926 acres (375 ha) at an elevation of 1,573 feet (479 m). It has two asphalt runways, 2/20, 5,801 x 100 (1,768 x 30 m), and 14/32, 5,806 by 100 feet (1,770 x 30 m).

In the year ending July 12, 2022, the airport had 11,434 aircraft operations, average 31 per day: 73% general aviation, 25% air taxi, and 2% military. 43 aircraft were then based at this airport: 36 single-engine, 6 multi-engine, and 1 jet.

== See also ==
- List of airports in Nebraska

== Other sources ==
- Essential Air Service documents (Docket OST-1998-3704) from the U.S. Department of Transportation:
  - Ninety-day Notice (April 1, 1998) of Great Lakes Aviation, Ltd. to terminate service at Norfolk, Nebraska.
  - Order 98-5-19 (May 12, 1998): prohibits Great Lakes Aviation, Ltd., d/b/a United Express, from suspending service at Fairmont, Minnesota, Norfolk, Nebraska, and Yankton, South Dakota, at the end of its 90-day notice period, and requires it to maintain service through July 24, 1998; requests proposals from interested carriers to provide replacement service.
  - Order 99-4-7 (April 12, 1999): approves Great Lakes Aviation, Ltd., d/b/a United Express's proposed alternate service pattern, by changing the hub to which service is subsidized for Norfolk, Nebraska, and Yankton, South Dakota, from Minneapolis to Denver. The order also selects Great Lakes to provide subsidized service at Fairmont, Minnesota, Brookings and Yankton, South Dakota, Devils Lake and Jamestown, North Dakota, and Norfolk, Nebraska, for a new two-year rate period at a total combined subsidy rate of $3,915,196 a year, effective on the date the carrier inaugurates the level of service described in Appendix B to this order, through April 30, 2001.
  - Order 2002-5-22 (May 24, 2002): tentatively reselects Great Lakes Aviation, Ltd. to provide subsidized essential air service (EAS) at North Platte and Norfolk, Nebraska, for the period from December 1, 2001, through November 30, 2003.
  - Order 2003-6-25 (June 19, 2003): tentatively terminates the subsidy eligibility of Norfolk, Nebraska, under the Essential Air Service (EAS) program because the subsidy per passenger exceeds the $200 per passenger statutory ceiling and the community is less than 210 highway miles from the medium hub airport at Omaha.
  - Order 2004-5-15 (May 20, 2004): selects Great Lakes Aviation, Ltd., to provide essential air service with subsidy support at Grand Island, Kearney, McCook, North Platte, and Scottsbluff, Nebraska, for two years at a total annual subsidy of $5,233,287. Also, makes final the termination of the eligibility of Norfolk, Nebraska, to receive subsidized essential air service proposed in Order 2003-6-25.
