= Millard Airport (Nebraska) =

Coordinates: 41°11′46″N 096°06′44″W

- IATA: MIQ; ICAO: KMLE; FAA LID: MLE

Summary
- Airport type: Public
- Owner: Omaha Airport Authority
- Serves: greater Omaha, Nebraska
- Elevation AMSL: 1,051 ft / 320 m

Map
- Location of airport in Nebraska / United States MLE (the United States)

Runways
Direction	Length		Surface
Direction	ft	m	Surface
12/30	3,801	1,159	Concrete

Statistics (2021)
- Aircraft operations (year ending 9/20/2021): 24,000
- Based aircraft: 125
- Source: Federal Aviation Administration

Millard Airport (IATA: MIQ, ICAO: KMLE, FAA LID: MLE) is a public airport seven miles (11 km) southwest of the central business district of Omaha, a city in Douglas County, Nebraska, United States. It is owned and operated by the Omaha Airport Authority, who also owns the main airport of Omaha, Eppley Airfield.

Although most US airports use the same three-letter location identifier for the FAA and IATA, Millard Airport is assigned MLE by the FAA and MIQ by the IATA (which assigned MLE to Malé International Airport on Hulhulé Island in the Malé Atoll of the Maldives).

== Facilities and aircraft ==
Millard Airport covers an area of 165 acres (67 ha) which contains one asphalt-paved runway (12/30) measuring 3,801 ft × 75 ft (1,159 m × 23 m). For the 12-month period ending September 20, 2021, the airport had 24,000 aircraft operations, an average of 66 per day: 94% general aviation, 6% air taxi and <1% military. There was at the time 125 aircraft based at this airport: 115 single-engine, 9 multi-engine, and 1 glider.

== See also ==
- List of airports in Nebraska
