= Broken Bow Municipal Airport =

Broken Bow Municipal Airport Keith Glaze Field
- IATA: BBW; ICAO: KBBW; FAA LID: BBW

Summary
- Airport type: Public
- Owner: Broken Bow Airport Authority
- Serves: Broken Bow, Nebraska
- Elevation AMSL: 2,547 ft (776 m)
- Coordinates: 41°26′11″N 099°38′32″W
- Interactive map of Broken Bow Municipal Airport

Runways
Direction	Length		Surface
Direction	ft	m	Surface
14/32	4,203	1,281	Concrete

Statistics (2011)
- Aircraft operations: 10,830
- Based aircraft: 13
- Source: Federal Aviation Administration

Broken Bow Municipal Airport (IATA: BBW, ICAO: KBBW, FAA LID: BBW), also known as Keith Glaze Field, is a public use airport located two nautical miles (4 km) north of the central business district of Broken Bow, a city in Custer County, Nebraska, United States. It is owned by the Broken Bow Airport Authority. This airport is included in the National Plan of Integrated Airport Systems for 2011–2015, which categorized it as a general aviation facility.

== Facilities and aircraft ==
Broken Bow Municipal Airport covers an area of 181 acres (73 ha) at an elevation of 2,547 feet (776 m) above mean sea level. It has one runway designated 14/32 with a concrete surface measuring 4,203 by 75 feet (1,281 x 23 m).

For the 12-month period ending June 29, 2011, the airport had 10,830 aircraft operations, an average of 29 per day: 97% general aviation, 2% air taxi, and <1% military. At that time there were 13 aircraft based at this airport: 85% single-engine and 15% multi-engine.

== See also ==
- List of airports in Nebraska
