= Grant Municipal Airport =

- IATA: none; ICAO: KGGF; FAA LID: GGF

Summary
- Airport type: Public
- Owner: City of Grant
- Serves: Grant, Nebraska
- Elevation AMSL: 3,425 ft (1,044 m)
- Coordinates: 40°52′14″N 101°44′02″W

Map
- Location of airport in Nebraska

Runways
Direction	Length		Surface
Direction	ft	m	Surface
15/33	4,797	1,462	Concrete

Statistics (2009)
- Aircraft operations: 9,500
- Based aircraft: 14
- Source: Federal Aviation Administration

Grant Municipal Airport (ICAO: KGGF, FAA LID: GGF) is a city-owned, public-use airport located two nautical miles (4 km) north of the central business district of Grant, a city in Perkins County, Nebraska, United States. It is included in the National Plan of Integrated Airport Systems for 2011–2015, which categorized it as a general aviation airport.

Although many U.S. airports use the same three-letter location identifier for the FAA and IATA, this facility is assigned GGF by the FAA but has no designation from the IATA.

== Facilities and aircraft ==
Grant Municipal Airport covers an area of 95 acres (38 ha) at an elevation of 3,425 feet (1,044 m) above mean sea level. It has one runway designated 15/33 with a concrete surface measuring 4,797 by 60 feet (1,462 x 18 m).

For the 12-month period ending June 30, 2009, the airport had 9,500 general aviation aircraft operations, an average of 26 per day. At that time there were 14 aircraft based at this airport, all single-engine.

== See also ==
- List of airports in Nebraska
