= Albion Municipal Airport =

- IATA: none; ICAO: KBVN; FAA LID: BVN

Summary
- Airport type: Public
- Owner: Albion Airport Authority
- Serves: Albion, Nebraska
- Elevation AMSL: 1,806 ft (550 m)
- Coordinates: 41°43′43″N 098°03′21″W
- Interactive map of Albion Municipal Airport

Runways
Direction	Length		Surface
Direction	ft	m	Surface
15/33	3,700	1,128	Concrete

Statistics (2023)
- Aircraft operations (year ending 7/13/2023): 5,100
- Based aircraft: 14
- Source: Federal Aviation Administration

Albion Municipal Airport (ICAO: KBVN, FAA LID: BVN) is a public use airport located three nautical miles (6 km) northwest of the central business district of Albion, in Boone County, Nebraska, United States. It is owned by the Albion Airport Authority. According to the FAA's National Plan of Integrated Airport Systems for 2009–2013, it is classified as a general aviation airport.

Although many U.S. airports use the same three-letter location identifier for the FAA and IATA, this airport is assigned BVN by the FAA but has no designation from the IATA.

== Facilities and aircraft ==
Albion Municipal Airport covers an area of 113 acres (46 ha) at an elevation of 1,806 feet (550 m) above mean sea level. It has one runway designated 15/33 with a concrete surface measuring 3,700 by 60 feet (1,128 x 18 m).

For the 12-month period ending July 13, 2023, the airport had 5,100 general aviation aircraft operations, an average of 98 per week. At that time there were 14 aircraft based at this airport: 12 single-engine, 1 multi-engine, and 1 helicopter.

== See also ==
- List of airports in Nebraska
