= Jim Kelly Field =

- IATA: LXN; ICAO: KLXN; FAA LID: LXN

Summary
- Airport type: Public
- Owner: Lexington Airport Authority
- Serves: Lexington, Nebraska
- Elevation AMSL: 2,413 ft (735 m)
- Coordinates: 40°47′26″N 099°46′33″W
- Interactive map of Jim Kelly Field

Runways
Direction	Length		Surface
Direction	ft	m	Surface
14/32	5,489	1,673	Concrete
1/19	3,200	975	Turf

Statistics (2021)
- Aircraft operations (year ending 8/4/2021): 10,640
- Source: Federal Aviation Administration

Jim Kelly Field (IATA: LXN, ICAO: KLXN, FAA LID: LXN) is a public use airport two miles northwest of Lexington, in Dawson County, Nebraska.

== Facilities ==
Jim Kelly Field covers 275 acres (111 ha) at an elevation of 2,413 feet (736 m). It has two runways: 14/32 is 5,489 by 100 feet (1,673 x 30 m) concrete; 1/19 is 3,200 by 250 feet (975 x 76 m) turf.

In the year ending August 4, 2021, the airport had 10,640 aircraft operations, average 29 per day: 96% general aviation, 4% air taxi and <1% military.

== See also ==
- List of airports in Nebraska
