= Johnson County Executive Airport =

Airport in Kansas, United States of America

- IATA: OJC; ICAO: KOJC; FAA LID: OJC

Summary
- Airport type: Public
- Owner: Johnson County
- Operator: Johnson County Airport Commission
- Serves: Olathe, Kansas
- Time zone: CST (UTC−06:00)
  - Summer (DST): CDT (UTC−05:00)
- Elevation AMSL: 1,096 ft (334 m)
- Coordinates: 38°50′51″N 94°44′15″W
- Website: www.jocogov.org/executive-airport

Maps
- FAA diagram

- Location of airport in Kansas OJC (the United States)

Runways
Direction	Length		Surface
Direction	ft	m	Surface
18/36	4,098	1,249	Concrete

Helipads
Number	Length		Surface
Number	ft	m	Surface
H1	100	30	Asphalt

Statistics
- Aircraft operations (2018): 36,931
- Based aircraft (2020): 63
- Source: Federal Aviation Administration

Johnson County Executive Airport (IATA: OJC, ICAO: KOJC, FAA LID: OJC) is a public airport located four miles (6 km) southeast of the central business district (CBD) of Olathe, a city in Johnson County, Kansas, United States. Measured by number of aircraft operations, the facility was the fourth-busiest airport in the state of Kansas in 2018. The airport was on the FAA's list of airports whose control tower could be closed in September 2013, but it remains in operation.

== History ==
The airport was built as a naval auxiliary field for use in World War II. It was deeded to the city of Olathe in 1951, and to Johnson County in 1967.

The airport had commercial airline service provided by Air Midwest from 1973 through 1977 and again briefly in 1984. Air Midwest had nonstop flights to the Kansas City International Airport and the Wichita Mid-Continent Airport using Beechcraft 99 and Fairchild Swearingen Metroliner II aircraft. In 1984 the carrier also had nonstop service to the St. Louis Downtown Airport.

On March 7, 2017, a severe storm damaged several hangars and airplanes at Johnson County Executive Airport. The damages were blamed on straight-line winds reaching 80 to 85 mph (129 to 137 km/h).

== Facilities ==
Johnson County Executive Airport covers 568 acres (230 ha) and has one runway and one helipad:

- Runway 18/36: 4,098 x 75 ft. (1,249 x 23 m), surface: concrete
- Helipad H1: 100 x 75 ft. (30 x 23 m), surface: asphalt (closed indefinitely)

For the twelve-month period ending August 31, 2018, the airport had 36,931 aircraft operations, an average of 101 per day: 98% general aviation, 2% air taxi, and less than 1% military. In March 2020, there were 63 aircraft based at this airport: 56 single-engine, 6 multi-engine, and 1 helicopter.

== FBOs ==
Kansas City Aviation Center is an FBO at Johnson County Executive Airport and an authorized Pilatus, Piper aircraft dealership and service center. It was formerly a Diamond Aircraft dealership and service center.

Air Associates of Kansas is an FBO at Johnson County Executive Airport and an authorized Cessna Service Center and Cessna Pilot Center. It provides flight training, charter, maintenance, fuel, hangar, aircraft tiedowns and pilot supplies.

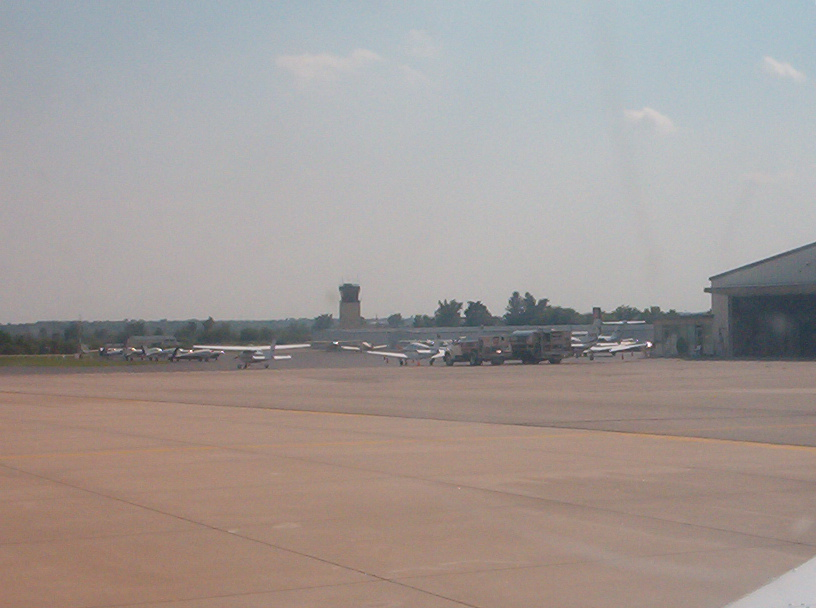
Ground view of KOJC from taxiway

== Accidents and incidents ==
- On February 13, 2022, a Piper PA-46 crashed shortly after takeoff at 10:30 am, killing its pilot, the only occupant on board. The pilot was a resident of Laguna Niguel, California, and was also the city's former mayor.

== See also ==
- List of airports in Kansas
