= York Municipal Airport =

- IATA: none; ICAO: KJYR; FAA LID: JYR

Summary
- Airport type: Public
- Owner: City of York
- Serves: York, Nebraska
- Elevation AMSL: 1,670 ft / 509 m
- Coordinates: 40°53′47″N 097°37′27″W
- Website: www.ci.york.ne.us/...

Map
- Location in Nebraska

Runways
Direction	Length		Surface
Direction	ft	m	Surface
17/35	5,898	1,798	Concrete
5/23	4,700	1,433	Turf

Statistics (2020)
- Aircraft operations (year ending 5/20/2020): 10,475
- Based aircraft: 26
- Source: Federal Aviation Administration

York Municipal Airport (ICAO: KJYR, FAA LID: JYR) is in York, Nebraska, 1 mile (1.6 km) northwest of the city center of York. The National Plan of Integrated Airport Systems for 2011–2015 categorized it as a general aviation facility.

Most U.S. airports use the same three-letter location identifier for the FAA and IATA, but this airport is JYR to the FAA and has no IATA code. (IATA assigned JYR to Jiroft Airport in Iran).

== Facilities ==
York Municipal Airport covers 467 acres (1.89 km^{2}) at an elevation of 1,670 feet (509 m). It has two runways: 17/35 is 5,898 by 100 feet (1,798 x 30 m) concrete and 5/23 is 4,700 by 150 feet (1,433 x 46 m) turf.

In the year ending May 20, 2020, the airport had 10,475 aircraft operations, average 29 per day: 97% general aviation, 3% air taxi, and <1% military.

26 aircraft were then based at this airport, 23 single-engine, 1 multi-engine, and 2 glider.

== See also ==
- List of airports in Nebraska
