= O'Neill Municipal Airport =

O'Neill Municipal Airport John L. Baker Field
- IATA: ONL; ICAO: KONL; FAA LID: ONL

Summary
- Airport type: Public
- Owner: O'Neill Airport Authority
- Serves: O'Neill, Nebraska
- Elevation AMSL: 2,034 ft / 620 m
- Coordinates: 42°28′10″N 098°41′14″W

Map
- Location of airport in Nebraska / United States ONL (the United States)

Runways
Direction	Length		Surface
Direction	ft	m	Surface
4/22	3,200	975	Concrete
13/31	4,408	1,344	Concrete

Statistics (2021)
- Aircraft operations: 7,440
- Based aircraft: 21
- Source: Federal Aviation Administration

The O'Neill Municipal Airport (IATA: ONL, ICAO: KONL, FAA LID: ONL) (John L. Baker Field) is two miles northwest of O'Neill, in Holt County, Nebraska. It is owned by the O'Neill Airport Authority. The FAA's National Plan of Integrated Airport Systems for 2009–2013 categorized it as a general aviation facility.

The field is named after John L. Baker, a native of O'Neill who was a fighter pilot in the Korean War, the United States Department of Justice's first air-crash attorney, counsel to the United States Senate, and the Federal Aviation Administration as Assistant Systems Administrator for General Aviation. He also served as president of both the AOPA and International Council of Aircraft Owner and Pilot Associations (IAOPA), the latter of which saw him represent 37 countries in the ICAO.

== Facilities ==
O'Neill Municipal covers 316 acres (128 ha) at an elevation of 2,033 feet (620 m). It has 2 concrete runways: 13/31 is 4,408 by 75 feet (1,344 x 23 m), 04/22 is 3,200 by 60 feet (975 x 18 m).

In the year ending May 28, 2021, the airport averaged 20 aircraft operations per day: 99% general aviation and <1% military. 21 aircraft were then based at the airport: 19 single-engine and 2 multi-engine.

== See also ==
- List of airports in Nebraska
