= Andringitra (plant) =

Scientific classification
- Kingdom: Plantae
- Clade: Tracheophytes
- Clade: Angiosperms
- Clade: Eudicots
- Clade: Rosids
- Order: Malvales
- Family: Malvaceae
- Genus: Andringitra; Skema

Genus of flowering plants

Andringitra is a genus of flowering plants belonging to the family Malvaceae.

Its native range is Madagascar.

Species:

- Andringitra leiomacrantha (Hochr.) Skema
- Andringitra leucomacrantha (Hochr.) Skema
- Andringitra macrantha (Baker) Skema
- Andringitra moratii (L.C.Barnett & Dorr) Skema
- Andringitra muscosa (Hochr.) Skema
- Andringitra seyrigii (Arènes) Skema
