= Central Nebraska Regional Airport =

Airport in Nebraska

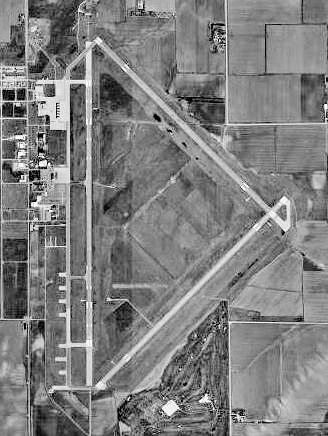
- USGS 1999 orthophoto
- IATA: GRI; ICAO: KGRI; FAA LID: GRI

Summary
- Airport type: Public
- Owner: Hall County Airport Authority
- Serves: Grand Island, Nebraska
- Elevation AMSL: 1,847 ft (563 m)
- Coordinates: 40°58′03″N 098°18′35″W
- Website: flygrandisland.com

Map
- Location within Nebraska Location within the United States

Runways
Direction	Length		Surface
Direction	ft	m	Surface
17/35	7,002	2,134	Concrete
13/31	6,608	2,014	Concrete

Statistics (2022)
- Aircraft operations (12 months ending June 30, 2022): 20,074
- Based aircraft: 37
- Source: Federal Aviation Administration

Central Nebraska Regional Airport (IATA: GRI, ICAO: KGRI, FAA LID: GRI) is three miles northeast of Grand Island, in Hall County, Nebraska. It is owned by the Hall County Airport Authority. The airport sees two airlines, Allegiant Air which flies independently and American Eagle which is subsidized by the federal Essential Air Service program. In 2016 the airport had 68,879 passenger boardings (enplanements), a 6.6% increase from the 64,602 enplanements in 2015. The airport had 7,961 enplanements in calendar year 2008, 20,136 in 2009 and 37,101 in 2010.

The National Plan of Integrated Airport Systems for 2017–2021 categorized it as a nonhub primary airport based on enplanements in 2016 (over 10,000 per year).

== History ==
The facility was formerly Grand Island Army Airfield. Today about a dozen military buildings remain there including several hangars, some former warehouses being used for commercial storage and several sheds along with the old parachute building.

=== Historical airline service ===
United Airlines provided the first commercial airline service to GRI in the mid-1930s when the airport was added as a stop on United's transcontinental air route between San Francisco and New York. Many other cities were served on this route including Sacramento, Reno, Salt Lake City, Denver, Lincoln, Omaha, Des Moines, Moline, Chicago, Toledo, and Cleveland. United began using Boeing 247 aircraft and later upgraded with Douglas DC-3s and Convair 340s. Service continued until 1959 when Frontier Airlines took over.

Frontier Airlines (1950-1986) began serving GRI in 1959 on a route between Denver and Kansas City which made stops at Cheyenne, Scottsbluff, North Platte, Grand Island, Lincoln, Omaha, and St. Joseph. The carrier began service with Convair 340 aircraft and upgraded to Convair 580s by the mid-1960s. In 1970 Frontier introduced Boeing 737-200 jet service to GRI with direct flights to Denver and Omaha and occasional direct service was provided to Chicago, Kansas City, Dallas/Fort Worth, Phoenix, and Las Vegas. Frontier's jet service ended in 1984 and was replaced by Frontier Commuter using Convair 580s but all service ended in early 1985.

From the late 1970s through the 2000s GRI received service from a series of smaller commuter airlines. Several of these carriers operated on behalf of major airlines such as United Express and Continental Express. After 1990, only one carrier at a time served GRI as service to the airport became subsidized under the federal Essential Air Service program in which a certain carrier is awarded such service.

Air Wisconsin served GRI on two occasions; 1979–1981 with a route to Minneapolis making a stop in Lincoln using Fairchild Swearingen Metroliners and 1985–1986 with a route to Chicago O'hare International Airport also making a stop at Lincoln using BAC One-Eleven jets.

Air Nebraska, 1980–1981, with a Kearney - Grand Island - Omaha - Kansas City route using an Embraer EMB 110 Bandeirante.

Pioneer Airlines served GRI from 1983 through 1986 operating on behalf of Continental Airlines as Continental Commuter. The carrier flew to Denver and Omaha with stops at cities throughout Nebraska and used Beechcraft Model 99 and Fairchild Swearingen Metroliner aircraft.

Rocky Mountain Airways began service in 1985 along the Denver - Scottsbluff - North Platte - Grand Island - Lincoln - Omaha route, otherwise known as the River Route, as it mostly serves cities along the Platte River. Rocky Mountain began a code-share alliance with Continental Airlines in 1986 and operated as Continental Express before ending service in 1987. The carrier used de Havilland Dash 7 aircraft.

Air Midwest began service in 1982 with routes to Lincoln, Omaha, and Kansas City using Fairchild Swearingen Metroliners. In 1986 the carrier began operating as Eastern Express on behalf of Eastern Airlines and in 1988 Air Midwest switched their alliance to Braniff Airways operating as Braniff Express. A Saab 340 aircraft was used for a time while flying as Eastern Express. Service ended in 1989.

Midcontinent Airlines began service in 1986 with flights to Kansas City and Omaha. In 1987 the carrier also began operating as Braniff Express alongside Air Midwest. Midcontinent used Embraer EMB 110 Bandeirante and Fairchild Swearingen Metroliner aircraft. After the collapse of Braniff in 1989, Midcontinent flew under its own identity to Kansas City before ending service in 1990.

GP Express Airlines was headquartered in Grand Island and began service in 1987 along the river route after Rocky Mountain/Continental Express ended their service. Flights to Kansas City and Minneapolis were added in 1990 and the carrier began a code-share alliance with Continental Airlines in 1994 operating as Continental Connection. GP Express used Beechcraft Model 99 and Beechcraft 1900C aircraft. The carrier shut down in 1996.

Great Lakes Airlines began GRI service in 1996 after the collapse of GP Express. Great lakes operated as United Express on behalf of United Airlines using Beechcraft 1900D aircraft. Direct service was provided to Denver, Chicago, Minneapolis, and Omaha. Great Lakes lost its designation as United Express in 2002 but continued service under its own branding until 2006.

Air Midwest returned to GRI operating as US Airways Express on behalf of US Airways via a code sharing agreement. The carrier commenced service on October 29, 2006, with two daily flights to Omaha Eppley Airfield and one daily flight to Kansas City International Airport. Air Midwest ended their service in May 2008, and local commuter air carrier Island Air then announced plans to take over but did not begin this new replacement service.

GRI then went for a period of time in 2008 with no service. Great Lakes Airlines returned in 2009 with flights to Denver which continued until the current provider, American Eagle, began service in 2011.

American Eagle, operating on behalf of American Airlines, began serving GRI on June 9, 2011, with two daily flights to DFW using Embraer 145 regional jets. At times a third flight was added and larger jets including the CRJ-700 and CRJ-900s have been used.

Allegiant Air began service in 2008 with flights to Las Vegas and later added flights to the Phoenix-Mesa Gateway Airport. During 2016 flights were briefly added to Orlando Sanford International Airport. Typically, flights run on two days per week. Allegiant started service with McDonnell Douglas MD-80 jets and now operates Airbus A319s and Airbus A320s.

== Facilities ==
The airport covers 1,847 acres (747 ha) at an elevation of 1,847 feet (563 m). It has two concrete runways: 17/35 is 7,002 by 150 feet (2,134 x 46 m) and 13/31 is 6,608 by 100 feet (2,014 x 30 m).

In the year ending June 30, 2022, the airport had 20,074 aircraft operations, an average of 55 per day: 67% general aviation, 20% air taxi, 11% military, and 3% commercial. 37 aircraft were then based at this airport: 22 single-engine, 3 multi-engine, 2 jet and 10 military.

Central Nebraska Regional Airport was selected to be a new Chinook Helicopter Base. The Nebraska National Guard has been on site since 2004, with ground scheduled to be broken in 2006 and the base opening in 2008.

In April 2016 a new terminal was opened, costing an estimated $20 million; the old terminal will become office space for the Hall County airport authority. Gate 1 now has a fully closed jet bridge or "jetway" to the aircraft, a first for any airport in the Central Nebraska area. Plans include a second jet bridge if more airlines come in.

Trego-Dugan Aviation, the on-site FBO, has moved buildings, now operating adjacent to their service hangars. The new space includes Wifi, an Internet cafe, and a lounge for private pilots.

== Airlines and destinations ==
=== Passenger ===
Airlines	Destinations
Allegiant Air	Las Vegas, Phoenix/Mesa
American Eagle	Dallas/Fort Worth

Destinations map
Destinations from Central Nebraska Regional Airport
Red = Year-round destination

The airport has scheduled passenger jet service on two airlines. Allegiant Air began flights to Las Vegas on September 4, 2008, with McDonnell Douglas MD-80 jetliners and now flies Airbus A319 jets several days a week nonstop to Las Vegas and Phoenix, the latter being served via Phoenix–Mesa Gateway Airport. During summer 2016 nonstop flights were also operated to Orlando Sanford International Airport. On June 9, 2011, American Eagle operated by Envoy Air commenced flying between GRI and Dallas/Ft. Worth utilizing Embraer ERJ family jets. Occasionally American Eagle service will operate by SkyWest Airlines using Canadair CRJ-700 aircraft and by Mesa Airlines with Canadair CRJ-900 regional jets.

== Top domestic destinations ==
Busiest domestic routes from GRI (December 2024 – November 2025)
Rank	Airport	Passengers	Carriers
1	Dallas/Ft. Worth, Texas	37,200	American
2	Phoenix–Mesa, Arizona	22,670	Allegiant
3	Las Vegas, Nevada	14,350	Allegiant

== Accidents and incidents ==
- On December 21, 1962, Frontier Airlines Flight 363, a Convair CV-340 touched down 4061 feet short of Runway 17 in fog at the airport. The aircraft caught fire but all 3 crew and 39 passengers survived.
- On October 20, 1977, ex convict Thomas Michael Hannan pulled a shotgun at a screening point in the airport and forced a Frontier Airlines Boeing 737 to fly to Kansas City for refueling and fly again to Hartsfield Jackson Atlanta International Airport. After certain demands were made, the hostages were released in Atlanta, and the hijacker shot and killed himself.

== See also ==
- List of airports in Nebraska

== Other sources ==
- Essential Air Service documents (Docket OST-2002-13983) from the U.S. Department of Transportation:
  - Order 2004-5-15: selecting Great Lakes Aviation, Ltd., to provide essential air service with subsidy support at Grand Island, Kearney, McCook, North Platte, and Scottsbluff, Nebraska, for two years at a total annual subsidy of $5,233,287. Also, the department makes final the termination of the eligibility of Norfolk, Nebraska, to receive subsidized essential air service proposed in Order Order 2003-6-25, June 19, 2003.
  - Order 2006-6-26: selecting Air Midwest for service at Grand Island and McCook, Nebraska, for two years, beginning when the carrier inaugurates full service, at a total annual subsidy of $2,296,462 for both communities. Grand Island will receive two nonstop round trips to Omaha each weekday and weekend (12 total round trips per week) and one nonstop round trip each weekday and weekend to Kansas City (6 total round trips per week); McCook will receive two one-stop round trips each weekday and weekend to Omaha (12 one-stop round trips per week); both Grand Island and McCook will be served with 19-passenger Beech 1900-D aircraft.
  - Order 2008-7-8: selecting Great Lakes Airlines, Ltd. to provide subsidized essential air service at Grand Island, Nebraska, Joplin, Missouri, El Dorado/Camden, Harrison, and Hot Springs, Arkansas, at a combined annual subsidy.
  - Order 2011-1-25: selecting American Eagle Airlines to provide essential air service (EAS) at Grand Island, Nebraska, for an annual subsidy of $2,215,582, for a two-year period beginning when the carrier inaugurates service through the end of the 24th month thereafter.
