= Baron Aviation Services =

Cargo airline based in Vichy, Missouri, US

| IATA | ICAO | Call sign |
|---|---|---|
| - | BVN | SHOW-ME |
- Founded: 1973
- Hubs: Rolla National Airport
- Fleet size: 30
- Headquarters: Vichy, Missouri, United States
- Website: http://www.baron-aviation.com

Baron Aviation Services is an American cargo airline based in Vichy, Missouri, United States. It was established in 1973 and operates small package express cargo services on behalf of FedEx Express. Its main base is Rolla National Airport, Vichy, Missouri.

== Fleet ==
The Baron Aviation Services fleet consists of the following aircraft (as of December 2021)

| Aircraft | In fleet | Notes |
|---|---|---|
| Cessna 208 Caravan | 30 | |

== Accidents and incidents ==
- On November 16, 1991, a Cessna 208 Caravan leased from FedEx departed on a cargo flight from Memphis en route to Destin when it plunged into Choctawhatchee Bay 2 miles NE of the Destin-Fort Walton Beach Airport while approaching for a landing. The pilot onboard was killed. The cause was determined to be the pilot's failure to follow proper ILS rules.
- On March 5, 1998, Flight 8315, a Cessna 208 Caravan leased from FedEx, departed on a cargo flight from Memphis en route to Bowling Green when radar and radio contact was lost. The plane crashed about 8.8 miles SE of Clarksville on a ridge on the northern side of a valley. The pilot, who was the aircraft's only occupant, was killed. The cause of the crash was ice on the wings, causing the plane to stall and crash.
- On November 6, 2012, Flight 8560, a Cessna 208 Caravan leased from FedEx departed on a scheduled cargo flight from Wichita to Garden City when the engine failed on the initial climb. While attempting to return to Wichita Mid-Continent Airport, the airplane impacted a tree in a field 1.3 miles south of Runway 1L. The pilot, the aircraft's only occupant, was killed. The cause of the crash was engine failure due to compressor turbine blade separation.
