= List of Horizon Air destinations =

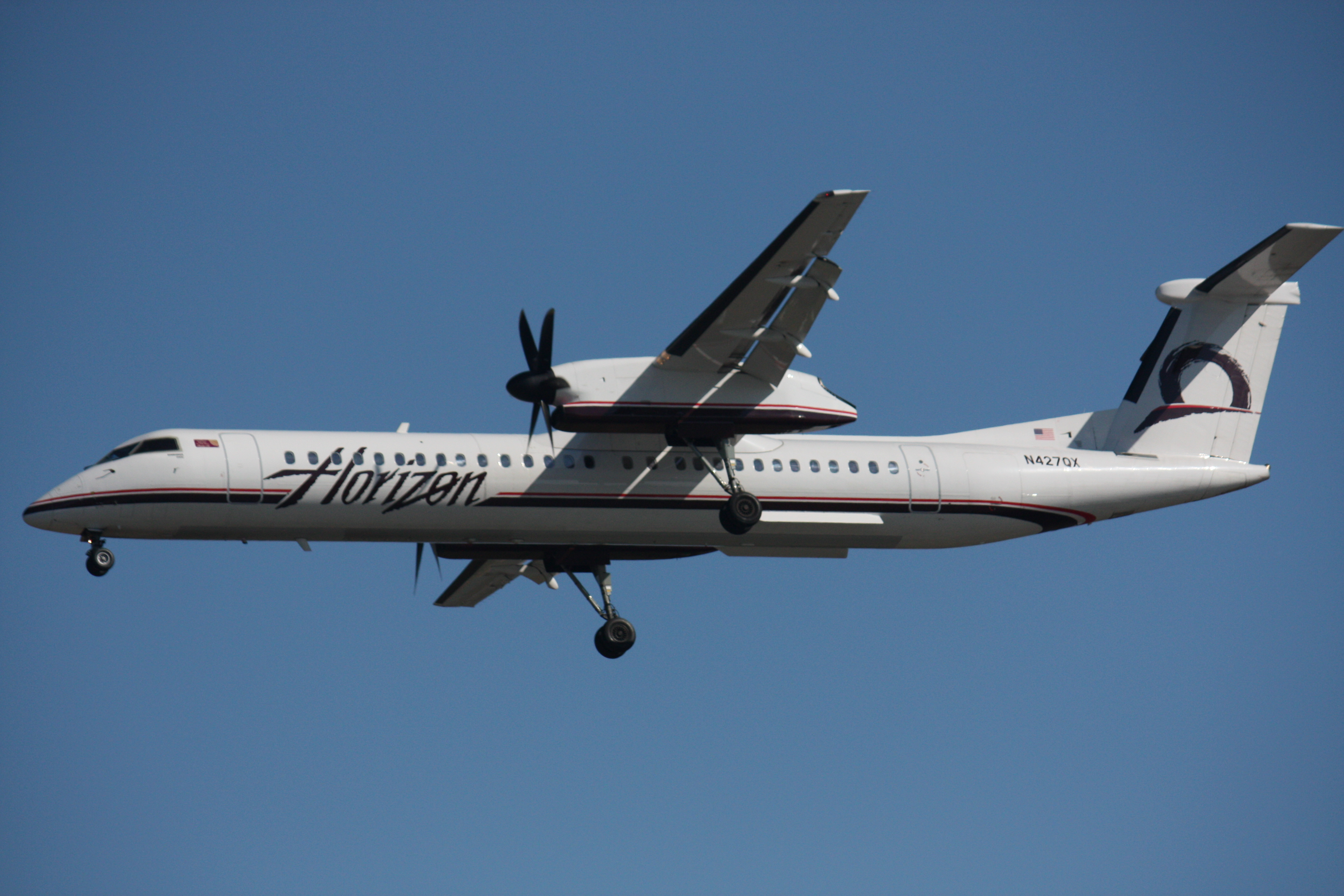
A Horizon Air Bombardier Q400 landing in Vancouver, British Columbia

Horizon Air, a regional airline based in SeaTac, Washington, serves 47 different destinations in the western United States and Canada and Mexico. Horizon Air's inaugural destinations in 1981 were Pasco, Seattle, and Yakima, Washington which were served with two wet leased Fairchild F-27 turboprop aircraft. In 1982, Horizon Air expanded into Oregon with a purchase of Air Oregon, and added service to seven new destinations. One year later, Horizon acquired Transwestern Airlines of Utah and then expanded into the intermountain West region of the United States. Five of the seven routes introduced with the acquisition of Air Oregon are still served by Horizon, with the exceptions of North Bend/Coos Bay, Oregon and by December 2008, Pendleton, Oregon. In 2008, Horizon restructured existing routes in order to transition to an all Bombardier Q400 fleet, removing the smaller Q200 turboprops as well as the CRJ-700 regional jets from the fleet.

One destination, Pendleton, Oregon, was subsidized through the Essential Air Service program. Horizon Air stopped serving Pendleton on December 1, 2008. This change was brought mainly in part by the fleet transition plan, as the Bombardier Q200 plane that served Pendleton was phased out of service. Horizon Air launched its first Mexican route, flying a CRJ-700 between Loreto, Mexico and Los Angeles, California in January 2008. Horizon has flown to Canada since at least 1993, when service was added from Bellingham and Seattle, Washington to Calgary, Alberta.

On May 14, 2011, several routes that were formerly served by Horizon Air were transferred to SkyWest Airlines, operating under the name Alaska SkyWest. SkyWest is operating five CRJ-700s purchased from Horizon Air under a capacity purchase agreement. This means that SkyWest owns and operates the aircraft, while Alaska Airlines is responsible for marketing and selling tickets for the flights. The CRJ-700s are operating on routes that would not be feasible to operate with neither Bombardier Q400s nor Boeing 737s.

On March 3, 2014, Horizon Air began daily flights from Anchorage to Fairbanks and Kodiak. The single daily flight to Kodiak is a seasonal service operated throughout the winter, while the Fairbanks flights replaced previous Alaska Airlines 737 service.

== Destinations ==
Hub and Crew Base
Focus City
Seasonal
Crew Base
Terminated destinations

Country	State/ Province	City	Airport	Began	Ended	Ref
Canada	Alberta	Calgary	Calgary International Airport	1992 (Note: Date of original service. Since service began, it has been terminated but has since been restored.)	Present	
Canada	Alberta	Edmonton	Edmonton International Airport	1995	Present	
Canada	British Columbia	Kelowna	Kelowna International Airport	1998	Present	
Canada	British Columbia	Prince George	Prince George Airport	2008	2008	
Canada	British Columbia	Vancouver	Vancouver International Airport	1989	Present	
Canada	British Columbia	Victoria	Victoria International Airport	1989	Present	
Mexico	Baja California Sur	La Paz	Manuel Márquez de León International Airport	2008	April 2013	
Mexico	Baja California Sur	Loreto	Loreto International Airport	2008	October 31, 2015	
United States	Alaska	Deadhorse	Deadhorse Airport	2014	March 2018	
United States	Alaska	King Salmon	King Salmon Airport	2020	Present	
United States	Alaska	Anchorage	Ted Stevens Anchorage International Airport	2014	Present	
United States	Alaska	Fairbanks	Fairbanks International Airport	2014	Present	
United States	Alaska	Dillingham	Dillingham Airport	2020	Present	
United States	Alaska	Kodiak	Kodiak Airport	2014	March 2018	
United States	Arizona	Flagstaff	Pulliam Airport	2008	2011	
United States	Arizona	Prescott	Ernest A. Love Field	2008	2011	
United States	Arizona	Tucson	Tucson International Airport	2017	Present	
United States	Arizona	Phoenix	Phoenix Sky Harbor International Airport	2017	Present	
United States	Arkansas	Little Rock	Little Rock National Airport	2004	2007	
United States	California	McKinleyville	Arcata-Eureka Airport	1994	2011	
United States	California	Burbank	Hollywood Burbank Airport	2017	Present	
United States	California	Fresno	Fresno Yosemite International Airport	1999	Present	
United States	California	Long Beach	Long Beach Airport	December 14, 2003	January 5, 2015	
United States	California	Los Angeles	Los Angeles International Airport	1999	Present	
United States	California	Mammoth Lakes	Mammoth-Yosemite Airport	2008	2018	
United States	California	Monterey	Monterey Regional Airport	2012	Present	
United States	California	Oakland	Oakland International Airport		Present	
United States	California	Ontario	Ontario International Airport	2017	Present	
United States	California	Orange County	John Wayne Airport	2016	Present	
United States	California	Palm Springs	Palm Springs International Airport	2002	Present	
United States	California	Redding	Redding Municipal Airport	1992	Present	
United States	California	Sacramento	Sacramento International Airport	1993	Present	
United States	California	San Diego	San Diego International Airport	2012	Present	
United States	California	San Francisco	San Francisco International Airport	2017	Present	
United States	California	San Jose	San Jose International Airport		Present	
United States	California	San Luis Obispo	San Luis Obispo County Regional Airport	2017	Present	
United States	California	Santa Barbara	Santa Barbara Municipal Airport	2017	Present	
United States	California	Santa Rosa	Charles M. Schulz - Sonoma County Airport	2007	Present	
United States	Colorado	Colorado Springs	Colorado Springs Airport	June 15, 2017	November 4, 2017	
United States	Colorado	Hayden/ Steamboat Springs	Yampa Valley Airport	2017	Present	
United States	Colorado	Denver	Denver International Airport		2007	
United States	Colorado	Gunnison	Gunnison–Crested Butte Regional Airport	2015	2017	
United States	Idaho	Boise	Boise Airport	1983	Present	
United States	Idaho	Lewiston	Lewiston-Nez Perce County Airport	1983	August 25, 2018	
United States	Idaho	Sun Valley	Friedman Memorial Airport	1983	Present	
United States	Idaho	Twin Falls	Magic Valley Regional Airport	1983	1997	
United States	Kansas	Wichita	Wichita Dwight D. Eisenhower National Airport	2017	Present	
United States	Minnesota	Minneapolis	Minneapolis-Saint Paul International Airport	2017	Present	
United States	Montana	Butte	Bert Mooney Airport	1988	August 24, 2008	
United States	Montana	Billings	Billings Logan International Airport	1988	Present	
United States	Montana	Bozeman	Gallatin Field Airport	1990	Present	
United States	Montana	Great Falls	Great Falls International Airport	1986	Present	
United States	Montana	Helena	Helena Regional Airport	1986	Present	
United States	Montana	Kalispell	Glacier Park International Airport	1986	Present	
United States	Montana	Missoula	Missoula International Airport	1986	Present	
United States	Missouri	Kansas City	Kansas City International Airport	2017	Present	
United States	Missouri	St. Louis	St. Louis International Airport	2017	Present	
United States	Nevada	Las Vegas	Harry Reid International Airport	2007	Present	
United States	Nevada	Reno/Lake Tahoe	Reno-Tahoe International Airport	2005	Present	
United States	New Mexico	Albuquerque	Albuquerque International Sunport	August 18, 2017	Seasonal	
United States	Oklahoma	Oklahoma City	Will Rogers World Airport	2017	Present	
United States	Oklahoma	Tulsa	Tulsa International Airport	2026	Present	
United States	Oregon	Astoria	Astoria Regional Airport	1995	1995	
United States	Oregon	Eugene	Mahlon Sweet Airport	1982	Present	
United States	Oregon	Klamath Falls	Crater Lake Klamath Regional Airport	1982	2008	
United States	Oregon	Medford	Rogue Valley International-Medford Airport	1982	Present	
United States	Oregon	North Bend / Coos Bay	Southwest Oregon Regional Airport	1982	2008	
United States	Oregon	Pendleton	Eastern Oregon Regional Airport	1982	2008	
United States	Oregon	Portland, OR	Portland International Airport	1981	Present	
United States	Oregon	Redmond/Bend	Roberts Field Redmond Municipal Airport	1982	Present	
United States	Oregon	Salem	McNary Field	1982	1993	
United States	Texas	Dallas	Dallas/Fort Worth International Airport	2017	Seasonal	
United States	Texas	Dallas	Dallas Love Field Airport	2017	Present	
United States	Texas	El Paso	El Paso International Airport	2019	Present	
United States	Utah	Salt Lake City	Salt Lake City International Airport	2014	Present	
United States	Washington	Bellingham	Bellingham International Airport	1987	Present	
United States	Washington	Everett	Paine Field	2019	Present	
United States	Washington	Pasco	Tri-Cities Airport	1981 (Note: Original Horizon Air destination)	Present	
United States	Washington	Port Angeles	William R. Fairchild International Airport	1987	January 6, 2004	
United States	Washington	Pullman	Pullman-Moscow Regional Airport	1982	Present	
United States	Washington	Seattle	Seattle-Tacoma International Airport	1981	Present	
United States	Washington	Spokane	Spokane International Airport	1983	Present	
United States	Washington	Walla Walla	Walla Walla Regional Airport	1985	Present	
United States	Washington	Wenatchee	Pangborn Memorial Airport	1984	Present	
United States	Washington	Yakima	Yakima Air Terminal	1981	Present	
United States	Wisconsin	Milwaukee	Milwaukee Mitchell International Airport	2017	Present	
