= Eastern Oregon Regional Airport =

Airport in Oregon, United States

Eastern Oregon Regional Airport Pendleton Army Airfield
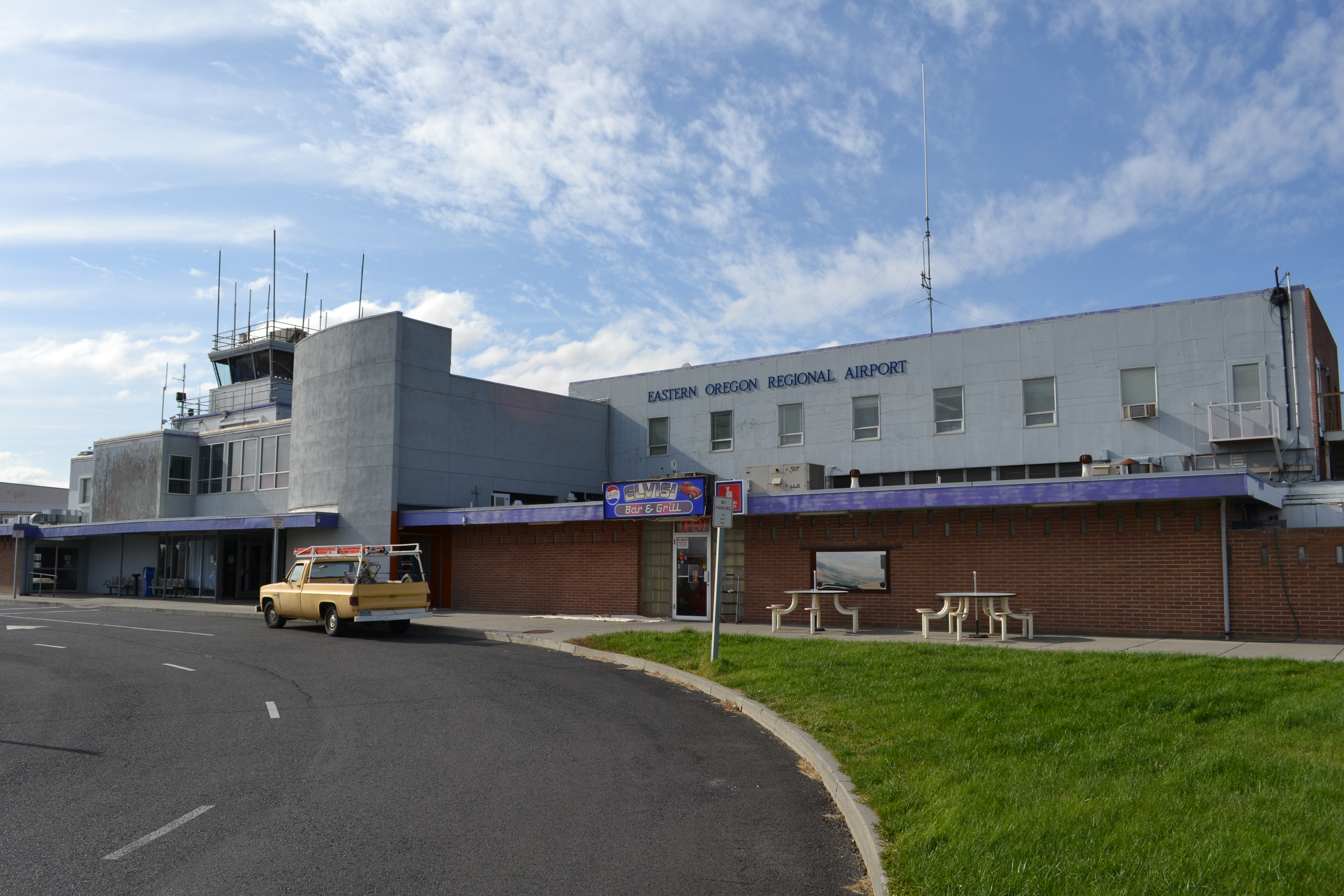
- IATA: PDT; ICAO: KPDT; FAA LID: PDT

Summary
- Airport type: Public
- Owner: City of Pendleton
- Serves: Pendleton, Oregon, United States
- Elevation AMSL: 1,497 ft (456 m)
- Coordinates: 45°41′42″N 118°50′29″W

Map
- Location within Oregon Location within the United States

Runways
Direction	Length		Surface
Direction	ft	m	Surface
7/25	6,301	1,921	Asphalt
11/29	5,581	1,701	Asphalt

Statistics (2018)
- Aircraft operations: 14,881
- Based aircraft: 69
- Source: Federal Aviation Administration

Eastern Oregon Regional Airport (IATA: PDT, ICAO: KPDT, FAA LID: PDT) (Eastern Oregon Regional Airport at Pendleton) is a public airport three miles northwest of Pendleton, in Umatilla County, Oregon, United States. Commercial service is provided by Boutique Air to Portland, subsidized by the Essential Air Service program.

According to the Federal Aviation Administration, the airport had 7,217 passenger boardings in calendar year 2008, 3,828 in 2009, 4,898 in 2010 and 4,305 in 2015. The National Plan of Integrated Airport Systems for 2011–2015 categorized it as a non-primary commercial service airport (between 2,500 and 10,000 enplanements per year).

== History ==
=== World War II - Pendleton Field Army Air Corps Base ===
Beginning in June 1941 the 34th Bomb Squadron, flying North American B-25 Mitchell bombers, was based at Pendleton. It began flying anti-submarine patrols after the attack on Pearl Harbor in December 1941, and continued to do so until it moved to South Carolina in February 1942.

One of the 34th's pilots who served at Pendleton was Lt. William G. Farrow. He later volunteered for the April 1942 Doolittle Raid, was captured by the Japanese, and executed in October.

=== Historical airline service ===
United Airlines served Pendleton from the 1930s until 1981. Jet service appeared in 1968; United Boeing 727-100s, 727-200s and 737-200s flew nonstop mainly to Portland and Boise. In the late 1960s and into the 1970s, United flew direct, no change of plane 727 service to Salt Lake City, Chicago, and Newark or Washington, DC (DCA). In 1969 United 727-100s flew eastbound Portland - Pendleton - Boise - Salt Lake City - Chicago O'Hare Airport - Pittsburgh - Allentown/Bethlehem/Easton - New York Newark Airport and westbound Des Moines - Denver - Salt Lake City - Boise - Pendleton - Portland in addition to flying daily Boeing 737-200 service with a round trip routing of Pendleton - Portland - Eugene - Medford - San Francisco (SFO) for a total of three jet departures a day. According to the Official Airline Guide (OAG), by the spring of 1981 United was operating two daily Boeing 727-200 flights serving Pendleton with an eastbound routing of San Francisco (SFO) - Portland - Pendleton - Salt Lake City - Denver - Philadelphia and a westbound routing of Providence, RI - Chicago O'Hare Airport - Salt Lake City - Pendleton - Portland - San Francisco (SFO). All United mainline jet service ended on May 22, 1981.

Earlier in the 1960s United Douglas DC-6s, DC-7s and Convair 340s served Pendleton. In 1966 the airport was stop on a daily flight between Washington state and Oklahoma jointly operated by United and Continental Airlines as an interchange service with a Douglas DC-6B flying Seattle - Portland - Pendleton - Boise - Salt Lake City - Denver - Wichita - Tulsa while United was also operating twice daily round trip Portland - Pendleton - Spokane DC-6 service.

The airport was also served by two commuter airlines, the first being Cascade Airways from 1977 through 1978 with flights to Boise and Spokane using Beechcraft Model 99 airliners. Portland-based Air Oregon then served Pendleton from 1978 through 1982 using Fairchild Swearingen Metroliner commuter propjets with nonstop flights to Portland and Boise as well as to other smaller cities in Oregon which were served with small Piper Navajo prop aircraft. In 1981, Air Oregon was operating up to four nonstop flights a day to Portland with Metroliner aircraft before being acquired by Horizon Air later that same year.

Beginning in 1982, regional air carrier Horizon Air, now a subsidiary of Alaska Airlines, flew Fairchild Swearingen Metroliners followed by Fairchild F-27s and de Havilland Canada DHC-8 Dash 8s to Portland before ending service to Pendleton in 2008. Horizon flew under their own branding from 1982 until mid-1985, as United Express from mid-1985 through early 1987 on a code sharing basis on behalf of United Airlines, and then as Alaska Horizon from early 1987 through late 2008 on a code sharing basis on behalf of Alaska Airlines. By 1983, Horizon Air was operating two nonstop flights a day to Portland with Metroliner aircraft and in 1985 the airline was operating up to three nonstop flights a day to Portland, two with Metroliner aircraft and the third with a Fairchild F-27 turboprop. By 1998, Horizon Air was operating four daily flights from Pendleton with de Havilland DHC-8 Dash 8 turboprop service to Portland. One flight was nonstop while the other three all made a stop at Pasco, WA.

Just prior to ending service in 2008, Horizon changed their schedule to two flights per day to Seattle with one stop at Walla Walla, WA using Dash-8-Q400 aircraft.

On October 21, 2008, SeaPort Airlines was awarded a two-year grant under the federal Essential Air Service (EAS) program to provide commercial service from Portland to Pendleton beginning December 1, 2008, replacing the previous subsidized service operated by Horizon Air. SeaPort service continued to operate utilizing the Cessna 208 Caravan turboprop aircraft, six days a week until September 20, 2016, when the airline ceased all service due to bankruptcy.

=== Recent and current airline service ===
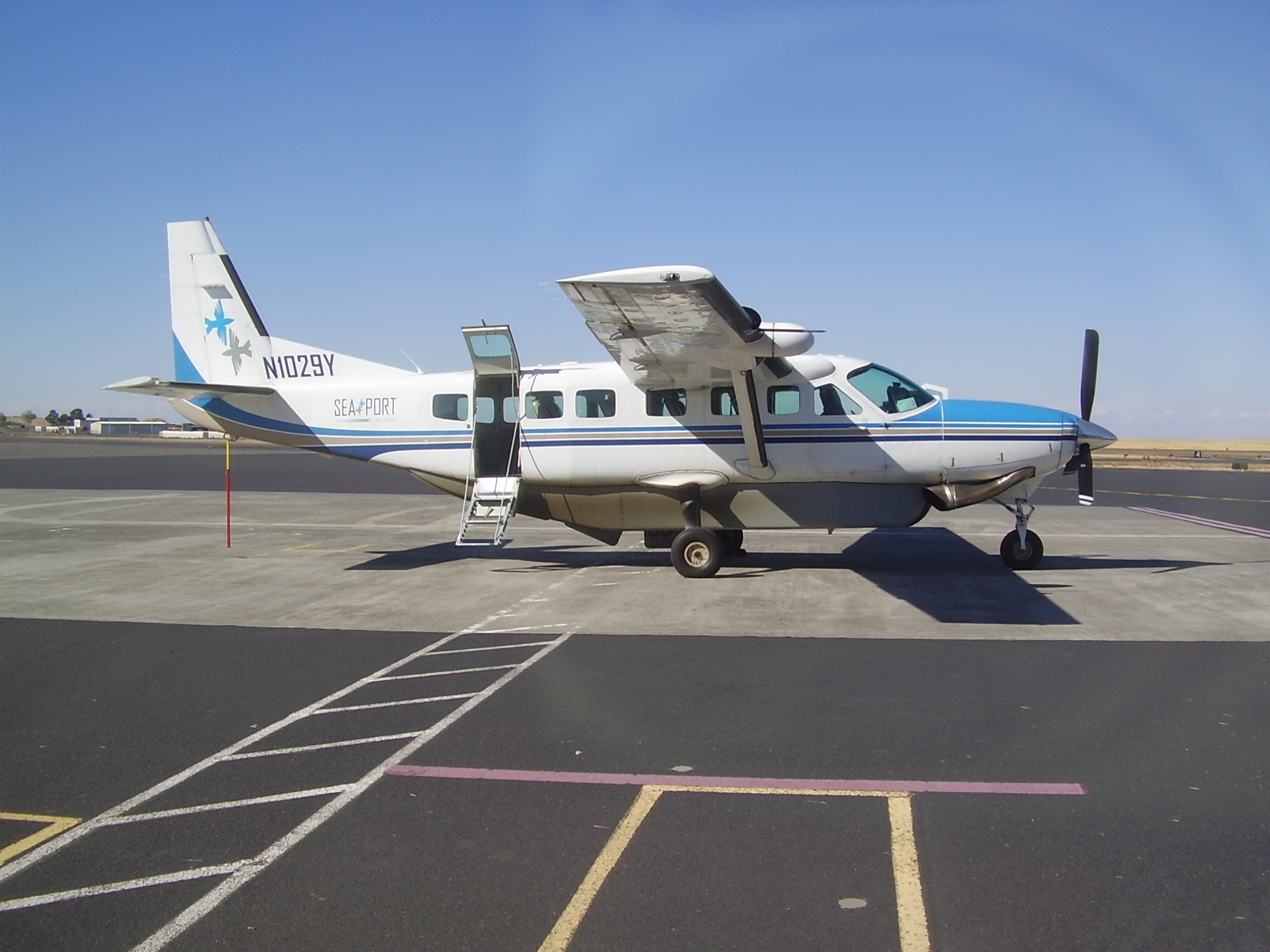
Cessna 208 of SeaPort Airlines on the apron

To replace SeaPort, Boutique Air was awarded a contract for 21 round-trips a week between Pendleton and Portland using Pilatus PC-12 turboprop aircraft, with the option to operate one service a day to Seattle/Tacoma instead of Portland, from October 1, 2016. The contract is worth US$2.3 million per year and goes until the end of 2022. Boutique Air has the option to operate trips from Pendleton to Boise, Idaho, but these will not be subsidized under the EAS program. Boutique Air is currently operating scheduled passenger service only to Portland from the airport.

In February 2026, the Pendleton City Council voted to recommend that SkyWest Charters, a Part 135 subsidiary of SkyWest Airlines, take over Boutique's completed contract. SkyWest operates 30-seat Bombardier CRJ200s. The airport manager stated that jet service is a necessary step to improve air service at Pendleton, attract more passengers, bring hundreds of thousands of FAA Airport Improvement Program (AIP) dollars into the community and retain Essential Air Service funding for the long-term. The Department of Transportation rejected the City Council's recommendation and awarded Boutique Air a new four-year contract to provide flight service from Pendleton to Portland.

== Airlines and destinations ==
=== Passenger ===
Airlines	Destinations
Boutique Air	Portland (OR)

=== Cargo ===
Airlines	Destinations
FedEx Feeder	La Grande, Spokane

== Statistics ==
=== Top destinations ===
Top domestic routes from PDT (June 2025 – May 2026)
Rank	City	Passengers	Carriers
1	Portland, (OR)	6,150	Boutique Air

=== Airline market share ===
Largest airlines at PDT (June 2025 – May 2026) (Arriving and Departing Passengers)
Rank	Airline	Passengers	Share
1	Boutique Air	12,420	100.00%

== Facilities and aircraft ==
Eastern Oregon Regional Airport covers 2,273 acres (920 ha) at an elevation of 1,497 feet (456 m). It has two asphalt runways: runway 8/26 measures 6,301 by 150 feet (1,921 x 46 m); runway 11/29 measures 5,582 by 100 feet (1,701 x 30 m). The airport is seeking federal grants to perform maintenance work on and rehabilitate runway 11/29.

In 2018, the airport had 14,881 aircraft operations, average 41 per day: 60% general aviation, 28% air taxi, and 12% military. 69 aircraft were then based at the airport: 32 single-engine and 2 multi-engine airplanes, 28 helicopter, and 7 military.

== See also ==
- Oregon World War II Army Airfields
- List of airports in Oregon

== Other sources ==
- This article incorporates public domain material from the Air Force Historical Research Agency
- Essential Air Service documents (Docket OST-2004-19934) from the U.S. Department of Transportation:
  - Order 2005-3-35 (March 25, 2005): selects Horizon Air Industries, Inc., d/b/a Horizon Air to provide subsidized essential air Service (EAS) at Pendleton, Oregon for a two-year period, and establishes a subsidy rate of $649,974 per year for service consisting of three weekday and four weekend nonstop or one-stop round trips between Pendleton and Portland with 37-seat Bombardier Q200 aircraft.
  - Order 2007-2-19 (February 16, 2007): re-selecting Horizon Air Industries, Inc., d/b/a Horizon Air, operating as Alaska Airlines, Continental Airlines and Northwest Airlines code-share partners, to provide subsidized essential air service (EAS) at Pendleton, Oregon, for an annual subsidy rate of $748,440, for the period from April 3, 2007, through April 30, 2009.
  - Order 2008-10-25 (October 21, 2008): selecting Alaska Juneau Aeronautics, Inc., d/b/a SeaPort Airlines, to provide subsidized essential air service (EAS) at Pendleton, Oregon, for the two-year period beginning when the carrier inaugurates full service, for a first year subsidy rate of $1,566,729 and $1,608,394 for the second.
  - Order 2010-10-18 (October 26, 2010): re-selecting Alaska Juneau Aeronautics, Inc., d/b/a SeaPort Airlines, to provide subsidized essential air service (EAS) at Pendleton, Oregon, for the two-year period from January 1, 2011, through December 31, 2012, for a first-year subsidy rate of $1,463.681 and $1,502.521 for the second.
