= Eugene Airport =

Eugene Airport Mahlon Sweet Field Eugene Municipal Airport

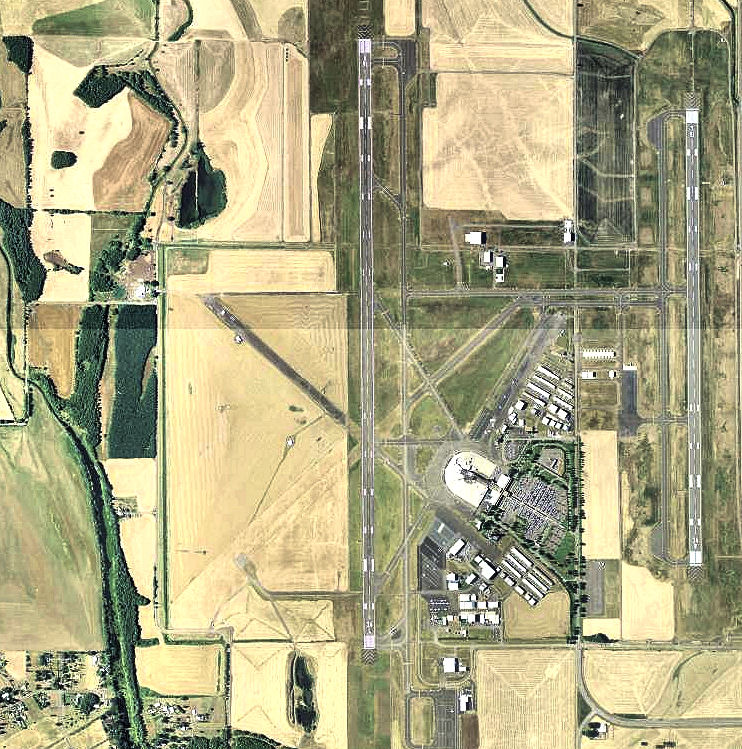
- 2006 USGS orthophoto
- IATA: EUG; ICAO: KEUG; FAA LID: EUG

Summary
- Airport type: Public
- Operator: City of Eugene
- Location: Lane County, near Eugene, Oregon
- Elevation AMSL: 374 ft (114 m)
- Coordinates: 44°07′23″N 123°13′07″W
- Website: www.flyeug.com

Map
- Interactive map of Eugene Airport

Runways
Direction	Length		Surface
Direction	ft	m	Surface
16R/34L	8,009	2,441	Asphalt
16L/34R	6,000	1,829	Asphalt

Statistics (2025)
- Passengers: 1,711,855
- Aircraft operations: 71,666
- Air cargo enplaned (lbs.): 1,142,040

Eugene Airport (IATA: EUG, ICAO: KEUG, FAA LID: EUG), also known as Mahlon Sweet Field, is a public airport 7 miles (11 km) northwest of Eugene, in Lane County, Oregon, United States. Owned and operated by the City of Eugene, it is the fifth-largest airport in the Pacific Northwest.

The terminal building has "A" gates on the upper level and "B" gates, ticketing, and baggage claim on the lower level. The airport has an expanded air cargo facility and three fixed-base operators (FBOs) to handle general aviation. In 2025, the Eugene Airport handled 1,711,855 passengers, a 1.76% increase from 2024.

The airport was named for Mahlon Sweet (1886–1947), a Eugene automobile dealer who was a strong supporter of aviation and pushed to get the now-defunct Eugene Air Park built in 1919, followed by the current airfield in 1943.

In 2010, a new airport rescue and firefighting facility was built.

EUG covers 2,600 acres (1,052 ha) of land.

== History ==
At the request of Mahlon Sweet, the original Eugene Air Park was built in 1919 at what is now the southeast corner of West 18th Avenue and Chambers Street (44.039°N 123.116°W). This first airstrip took care of all aviation operations until the modern Mahlon Sweet Field opened in 1943. The original site ceased operations in the summer of 1956.

During World War II, the airfield was used by the United States Army Air Forces. The December 1951 C&GS diagram shows three runways forming an asterisk: the 026-deg runway was 5,229 feet (1,594 m) in length, the 111-deg was 5,205 ft (1,586 m), and the 158-deg was 3,999 ft (1,219 m).

=== Historical service ===
- United Airlines was the first airline to serve Eugene. In June 1944, they began Douglas DC-3s and Convair 240 service, which flew to Portland, Seattle, Los Angeles, and San Francisco with various stops en route. United eventually upsized to larger aircraft, which included the Boeing 727-100s, 727-200s, 737-200s, 737-300s, and 737-500s into the airport nonstop to Denver, Los Angeles, San Francisco, and Portland.
- West Coast Airlines began Douglas DC-3 service to Eugene in 1947. Later West Coast operated Piper Navajos, Fairchild F-27s, and Douglas DC-9-10s to the airport before merging with Bonanza Airlines and Pacific Air Lines to form Air West in 1968. Shortly before the merger, West Coast was operating DC-9s to San Francisco via Medford and nonstop to Portland continuing to Seattle (Boeing Field), Boise, and Salt Lake City.
- Air West was renamed Hughes Airwest in 1970 with each airline serving Eugene with Douglas DC-9-10s and McDonnell Douglas DC-9-30s. In summer 1968 Air West was flying Spokane-Pasco-Yakima-Portland-Eugene-Medford-San Francisco-Fresno-Las Vegas with a DC-9 and had a nonstop DC-9 to San Francisco. By summer 1980, Hughes Airwest had become all-jet and was flying nonstop DC-9s to Los Angeles, San Francisco, Seattle, Boise and Pasco with direct DC-9s to Denver, Tucson, Redding, Redmond, Klamath Falls, and Yakima.
- In 1970 Alaska Airlines flew the Boeing 707 to Eugene for flights to Russia via Portland, Seattle and Anchorage.
- The original Frontier Airlines began a pair of Boeing 737-200 one stop direct flights to Denver via Salt Lake City in July 1979. That December, Frontier rerouted its Denver service via a stop in Boise.
- Eureka, CA-based commuter air carrier Century Airlines began flights to Crescent City, Eureka, Portland, Sacramento, and San Francisco out of Eugene in December 1979 using De Havilland twin otter and De Havilland dash 7.
- Portland, Oregon-based commuter air carrier Air Oregon began serving the airport in the late 1970s and by 1981 was operating Fokker F27 Friendship and Fairchild Swearingen Metroliner propjets on flights to Portland, Seattle, San Francisco, Sacramento, Reno, Eureka, Redding, Medford, Redmond, Pendleton, and North Bend.
- Republic Airlines acquired Hughes Airwest in September 1980 and continued to operate DC-9s to the airport but reduced the frequency formerly operated by Hughes Airwest to Los Angeles, San Francisco, Seattle, Pasco, Yakima, Redmond, and Klamath Falls, and ended all flights to Boise and Denver. During summer 1984, the airline had just two nonstop routes to San Francisco and Portland, and by spring 1985, Republic had left Eugene.
- Horizon Air acquired Air Oregon in 1981 and began serving Eugene with flights to Portland, Seattle, and other destinations with Fairchild F-27s and Fairchild Swearingen Metroliners. Horizon Air has continued to serve the airport for 35 years.
- In fall 1984, Cascade Airways began serving the airport with BAC One-Elevens, HS-748s and Beechcraft 1900Cs. Cascade operated BAC One-Elevens nonstop to Portland and Medford, and also flew the British twin jet direct to Seattle, Spokane, and Calgary from Eugene.
- In 1985, American Airlines began direct, one stop McDonnell Douglas MD-80 and Boeing 727-200 service to Dallas/Fort Worth and Chicago via Portland on July 2.
- Also in 1985, Cascade Airways was continuing to operate HS-748s and Beechcraft 1900Cs to Portland and other cities after ending its BAC One-Eleven service to the airport.
- Pacific Southwest Airlines (PSA) began three BAe 146-200 flights a day to San Francisco in December, 1985.
- On August 24, 1986, the original Frontier Airlines ceased operations and filed for bankruptcy, ending its flights to Denver.
- Continental Airlines began Boeing 737-300 service to Eugene in April 1987, picking up Frontier Airlines' previous service to Denver. Frontier's service to the airport ended when the airline filed for bankruptcy the previous year and was acquired by Continental's parent company, the Texas Air Corporation.
- After its acquisition of Pacific Southwest Airlines, USAir (later renamed US Airways) flew BAe 146-200s from the airport in 1989 to Los Angeles, San Francisco and Medford.
- Also in 1989, United Express operated by North Pacific Airlines was flying Embraer EMB-120 Brasilias and BAe Jetstream 31s to Portland and Seattle.
- American Airlines began service in 1985 with two daily McDonnell Douglas MD-80 flights to Portland, one continued onto Chicago and the other to Dallas/Fort Worth. Three daily Boeing 737-200 flights to its San Jose (SJC) hub were flown from December 2, 1988 until September 10, 1993.
- Delta Connection operated by SkyWest Airlines flew Canadair CRJ-200s nonstop to Salt Lake City from March 1995 until 1998, when it dropped the route due to a fleet shortage.
- In 1999, Air Wisconsin operating as United Express was flying BAe 146s nonstop to Denver in addition to nonstop United Boeing 727-200s on the same route.
- America West Express operated by Mesa Airlines started CRJ-200 flights to Phoenix in September 1999.
- Delta Connection operated by SkyWest Airlines resumed Canadair CRJ-200 regional jet service to Salt Lake City on May 1, 2004, with $1.2 million of incentives offered by various public and private sources to kick-start service.
- United Airlines flew Boeing 737s to San Francisco until January 6, 2003 (United Flight 1423 was the last Boeing 737 flight operated by the airline out of Eugene until United briefly resumed mainline service in 2008). United had previously served Eugene with Boeing 727-100s and 727-200s as well.
- SkyWest Airlines took over for United, flying Canadair CRJ-200s and operating as United Express to San Francisco on January 7, 2003.
- America West Express operated by Mesa Airlines also started flights to Las Vegas in March 1, 2003.
- Horizon Air, a subsidiary of Alaska Airlines, flew nonstop to Los Angeles from June 4, 2007 until June 6, 2010. The airline continues to operate flights to Portland and Seattle with the Bombardier Q400 propjet which is the largest and fastest member of the Dash 8 regional turboprop airliner family.
- In 2005, the crosswind runway was removed and replaced with Runway 16L/34R, 6,000 feet (1,800 m) long parallel to the primary runway 16R/34L.
- United Airlines resumed Boeing 737 flights to San Francisco in March 2008 but ended them the following August.
- Delta Connection operated by ExpressJet Airlines flew Embraer ERJ-145s nonstop to Los Angeles until September 1, 2008, when Delta ended its contract with ExpressJet on the Eugene-LAX route.
- Allegiant Air began flying McDonnell Douglas MD-80s nonstop to Phoenix/Mesa in October 2008 in addition to its nonstop MD-80s to Las Vegas.
- Allegiant Air launched twice weekly MD-80 flights nonstop to Los Angeles on June 3, 2010.
- Allegiant Air announced Eugene's first nonstop service to Hawaii in 2012. Launched on November 17, 2012, the once a week Boeing 757-200 to Honolulu was the largest scheduled passenger airliner at Eugene. Allegiant later ended nonstop service to Honolulu from Eugene in 2017; it continues to fly mainline jets nonstop to Las Vegas, Los Angeles, Oakland, and Phoenix/Mesa.
- On February 18, 2013, the current version of Frontier Airlines announced new Eugene–Denver service three times per week scheduled from May 16 to September 8. Frontier Airlines subsequently ceased all service to Eugene.
- In April 2013, American Airlines announced twice-daily Canadair CRJ-200 flights to Los Angeles (LAX) flown by SkyWest Airlines operating as American Eagle, to begin June 2013.
- In November 2015, Alaska Airlines began daily Bombardier Dash 8 flights to San Jose (SJC) flown by Horizon Air.
- In June 2016, United Airlines began mainline service to San Francisco International Airport flown by Airbus A319s and A320s.
- In April 2017, Delta Connection operated by SkyWest Airlines began daily service to Seattle/Tacoma International Airport flown by Canadair CRJ-700 regional jets.
- In May 2021, Avelo Airlines launched service to Bob Hope Airport in Burbank, California, using 737-700s and -800s. They later launched service to Palm Springs from Eugene using their 737-700s.

=== Current service ===
Horizon Air doing business under the name Alaska Airlines operates Embraer E175s to Eugene from Seattle–Tacoma and Los Angeles. They have also expanded to service San Diego, California.

Allegiant Air flies Airbus A319 and A320s to Las Vegas, Los Angeles, Oakland, and Phoenix-Mesa, and Santa Ana.

American Eagle (SkyWest Airlines) Canadair CRJ-700s fly nonstop to Phoenix-Sky Harbor; American mainline service to Dallas/Fort Worth began in 2021, operated by Airbus A319 and A320 aircraft.

Delta Connection (SkyWest Airlines) Embraer E175s fly to Salt Lake City and Seattle-Tacoma. Delta Air Lines also serves the airport with mainline aircraft.

United Airlines flies the Airbus A320 and Boeing 737 nonstop to Denver and San Francisco, and United Express (SkyWest Airlines) Embraer E175s fly to Denver and San Francisco.

In late August 2021, Southwest Airlines began Boeing 737 service to its focus cities of Oakland, California, and Las Vegas, Nevada. Service to San Jose, California began on June 5, 2022, & Denver, Colorado began on June 11, 2022.

== Airlines and destinations ==
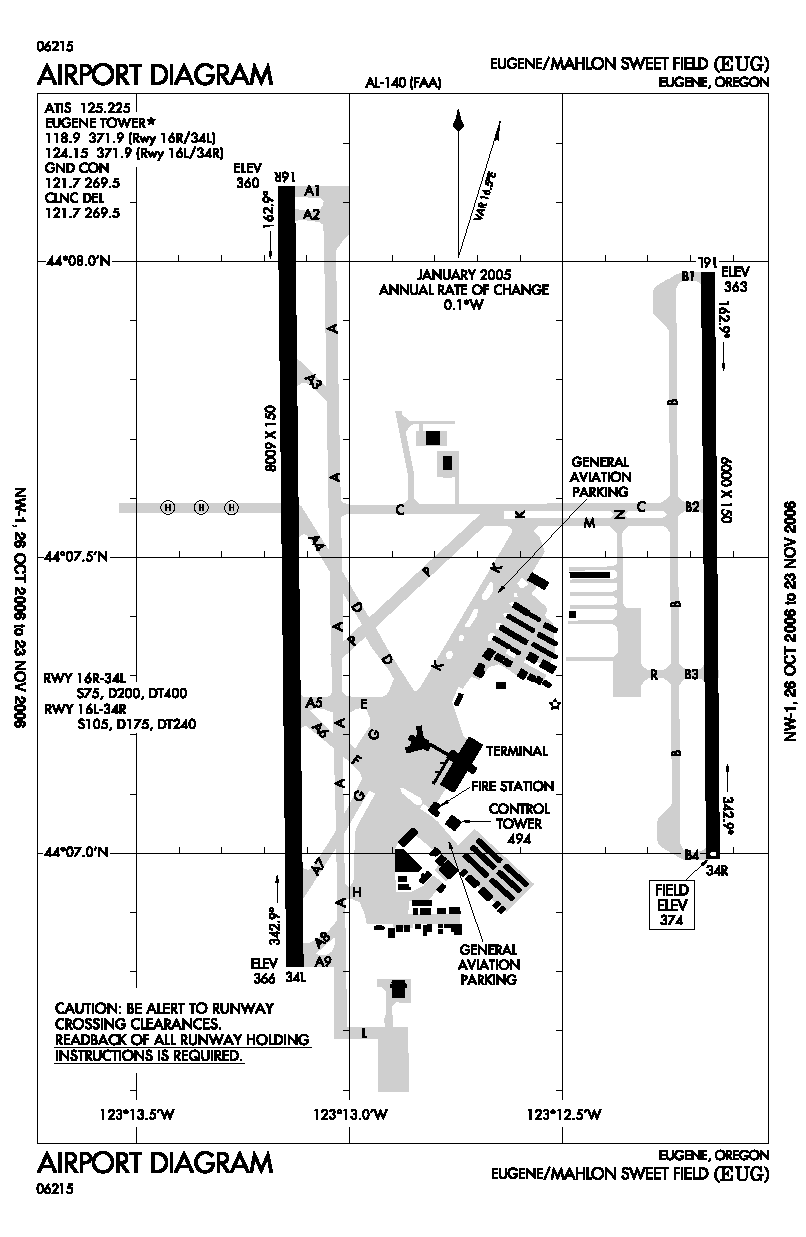
FAA airport diagram for EUG

=== Passenger ===
Airlines	Destinations	Refs
Alaska Airlines	Burbank, Los Angeles, Portland (OR), San Diego, Seattle/Tacoma	
Allegiant Air	Las Vegas, Orange County, Phoenix/Mesa	
American Airlines	Phoenix–Sky Harbor	
American Eagle	Phoenix–Sky Harbor	
Delta Connection	Salt Lake City, Seattle/Tacoma	
Southwest Airlines	Denver, Las Vegas, Sacramento, San Diego, San Jose (CA)	
United Airlines	Chicago-O'Hare, Denver, San Francisco	
United Express	Seasonal: Denver, San Francisco	

=== Destinations map ===
Destinations map
Destinations from Eugene Airport
Red = Year-round destination
Green = Seasonal destination
Blue = Future destination

== Statistics ==
=== Top destinations ===
Top domestic routes out of EUG (August 2025 – July 2026)
Rank	City	Passengers	Carriers
1	Seattle/Tacoma, Washington	162,070	Alaska, Delta
2	Denver, Colorado	160,280	Southwest, United
3	San Francisco, California	94,170	United
4	Las Vegas, Nevada	58,740	Allegiant, Southwest
5	Phoenix-Sky Harbor, Arizona	55,030	American
6	San Diego, California	48,370	Alaska, Southwest
7	Portland, Oregon	46,530	Alaska
8	Salt Lake City, Utah	44,700	Delta
9	Los Angeles, California	43,400	Alaska
10	Sacramento, California	31,110	Southwest

=== Airline market share ===
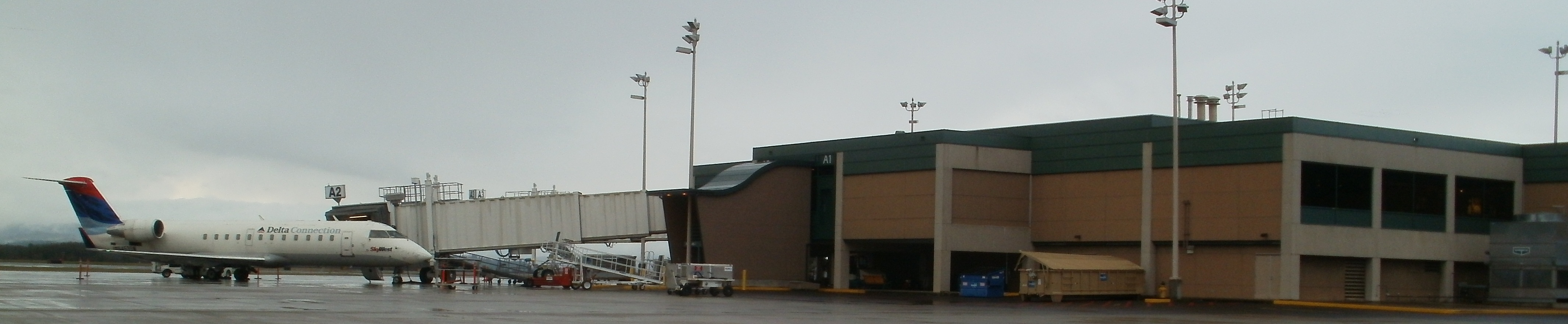
The airport's A-gates, with jet bridges

Largest airlines at EUG (January 2024 – December 2024)
Rank	Airline	Passengers	Share
1	Southwest Airlines	411,000	25.08%
2	United Airlines	358,000	21.85%
3	SkyWest Airlines	300,000	18.31%
4	American Airlines	181,000	11.05%
5	Horizon Air	175,000	10.69%
—	Other Airlines	213,000	13.01%

=== Annual traffic ===
EUG Airport Annual Traffic 2010-Present
Year	Passengers	% Change
2010	754,867	—
2011	797,178	▲5.61%
2012	826,517	▲3.68%
2013	880,257	▲6.50%
2014	892,873	▲1.43%
2015	909,121	▲1.82%
2016	984,175	▲8.26%
2017	1,078,504	▲9.58%
2018	1,168,110	▲8.31%
2019	1,218,104	▲4.28%
2020	546,212	▼55.16%
2021	1,144,028	▲109.45%
2022	1,575,025	▲37.19%
2023	1,719,629	▲9.18%
2024	1,682,311	▼-2.17%
2025	1,711,855	▲1.76%

== General aviation ==
There is one fixed-base operator on field that caters to general aviation, Atlantic Aviation. Atlantic specializes in maintenance and working on larger general aviation aircraft like Gulfstreams and Learjets. They are the only on-airport company that has fuel trucks. There is also a general aviation self-serve fuel station located on the field.

Eugene Flight Center, a flight school and charter operation, operates on the north end of the airport. They offer charter and aerial photography flights as well as flight instruction. Fairbanks Aircraft Service LLC is collocated with Eugene Flight Center and offers general aviation maintenance and repair services.

Mahlon Sweet is also home to the Lane Community College Flight Academy. LCC's Flight Technology Center provides flight instruction for private, commercial, instrument, multi-engine and flight instructor. Their fleet includes several Cessna 152s, a few Piper Warrior IIs, Piper Arrow IV, and a Piper Seminole. Lane Aviation Academy is located at the southern end of Mahlon Sweet Field. The Aviation Maintenance Technician program is one of the oldest FAA Pt. 147 approved AMT schools in continuous operation. The AMT program also operates a Pt. 145 Approved Repair Station. During the two-year program the students are taught all aspects of aircraft and helicopter maintenance and repair in preparation to pass the written and oral and practical exams to obtain FAA Airframe and Powerplants (A&P) certificates.

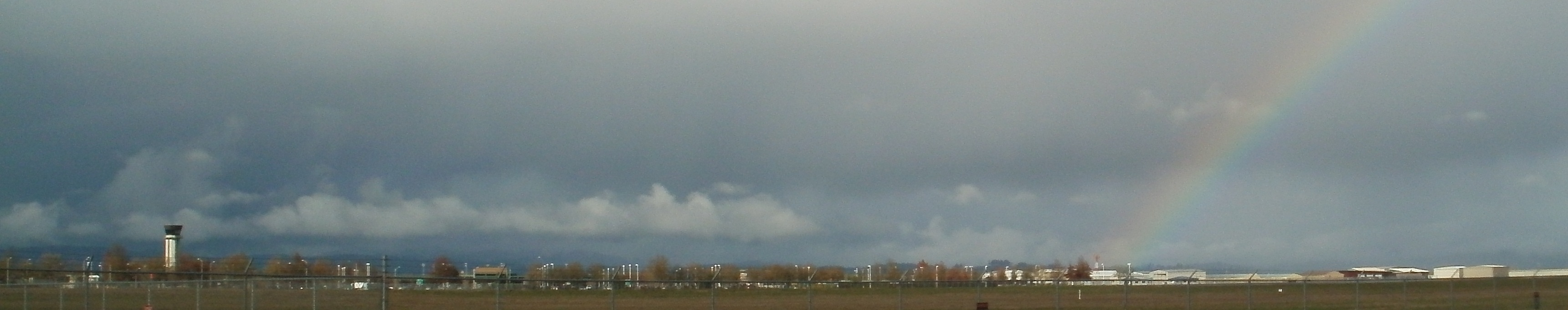
Panorama of the airport

== Parking ==
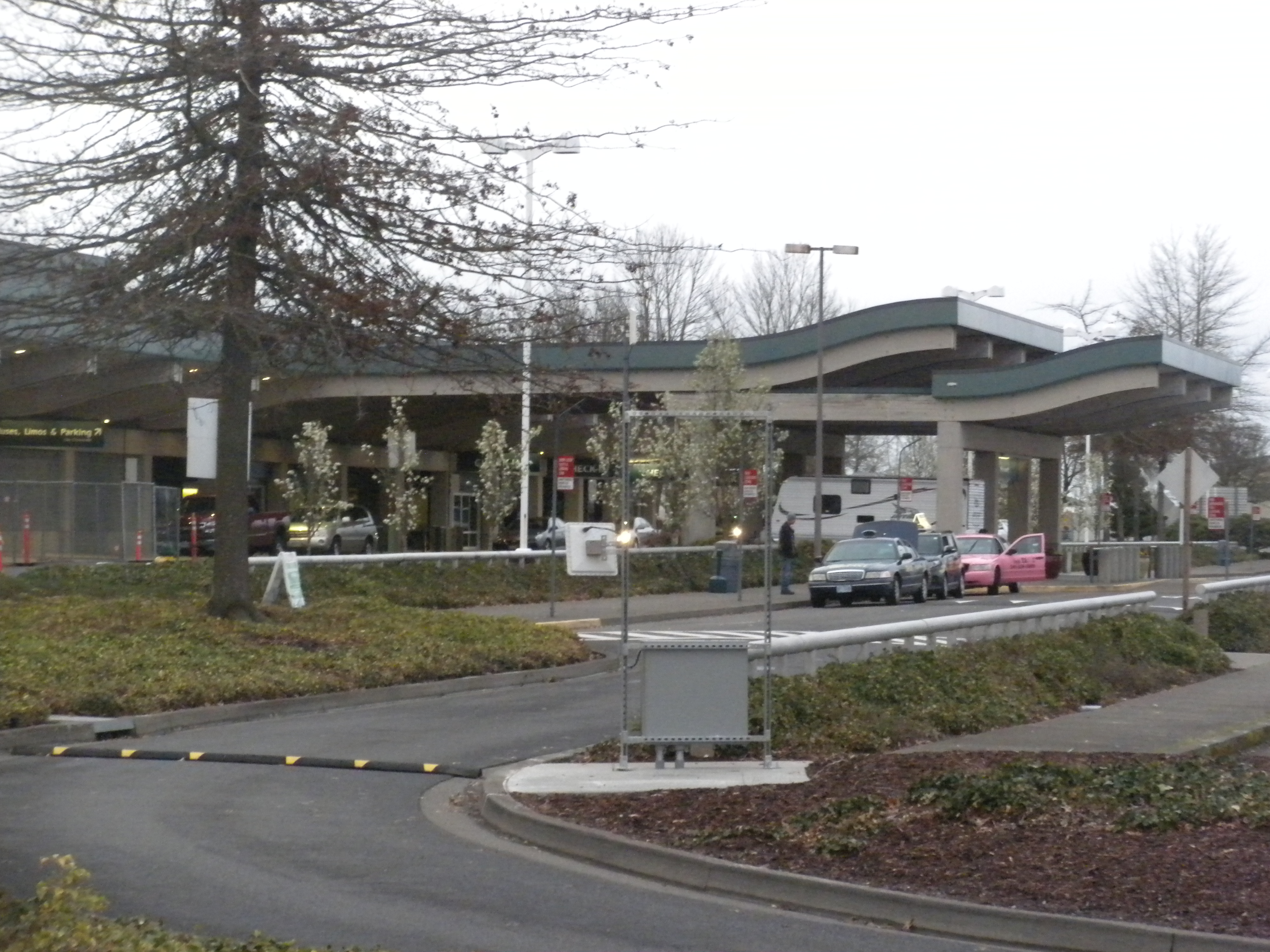
Terminal at Eugene Airport, March 2015

The parking facility is attended 24 hours a day and contains 237 short-term and more than 1000 long-term parking spaces in the main lot, with an additional 582 spaces in the overflow lot.

== Incidents and accidents ==
- On January 24, 1933, a Pacific Air Transport Ford Trimotor on a cargo flight crashed on takeoff, killing 2 out of the 3 occupants on board.
- On November 9, 1951, a West Coast Airlines Douglas DC-3 on final approach to EUG overtook and struck a Fairchild PT-23 aircraft. The DC-3 pilots noticed damage from the collision on the tail after landing. The Fairchild pilot continued to another airport but made a forced landing due to fuel exhaustion. There were no fatalities.
- On April 27, 2012, a Cessna Citation Excel operated by Pape Group Inc. made a gear up landing due to a malfunction and slid for about 1,500 feet before it came to rest on the runway. All three occupants survived. The aircraft was substantially damaged but repaired and placed back into service.
- On November 28, 2021, a Beechcraft Super King Air operated by Western Wings Corp. had several electrical malfunctions after departure. Attempting to return to EUG, the pilot could not extend the landing gear, and made a gear up landing. The aircraft was substantially damaged aft of the nose landing gear. All three occupants survived. According to FlightAware, N71VT was returned to active service.

== Gallery ==
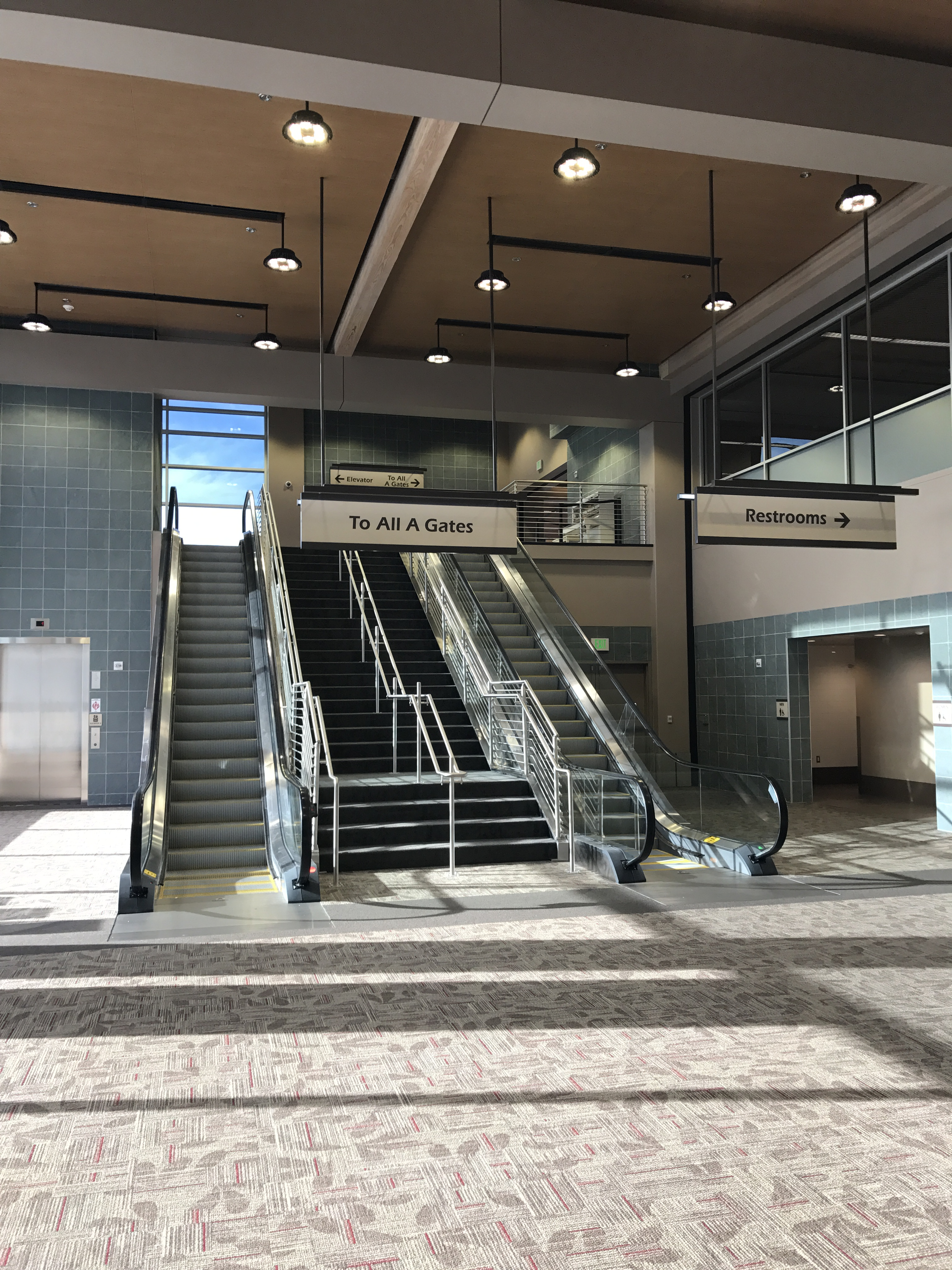
Terminal expansion at EUG

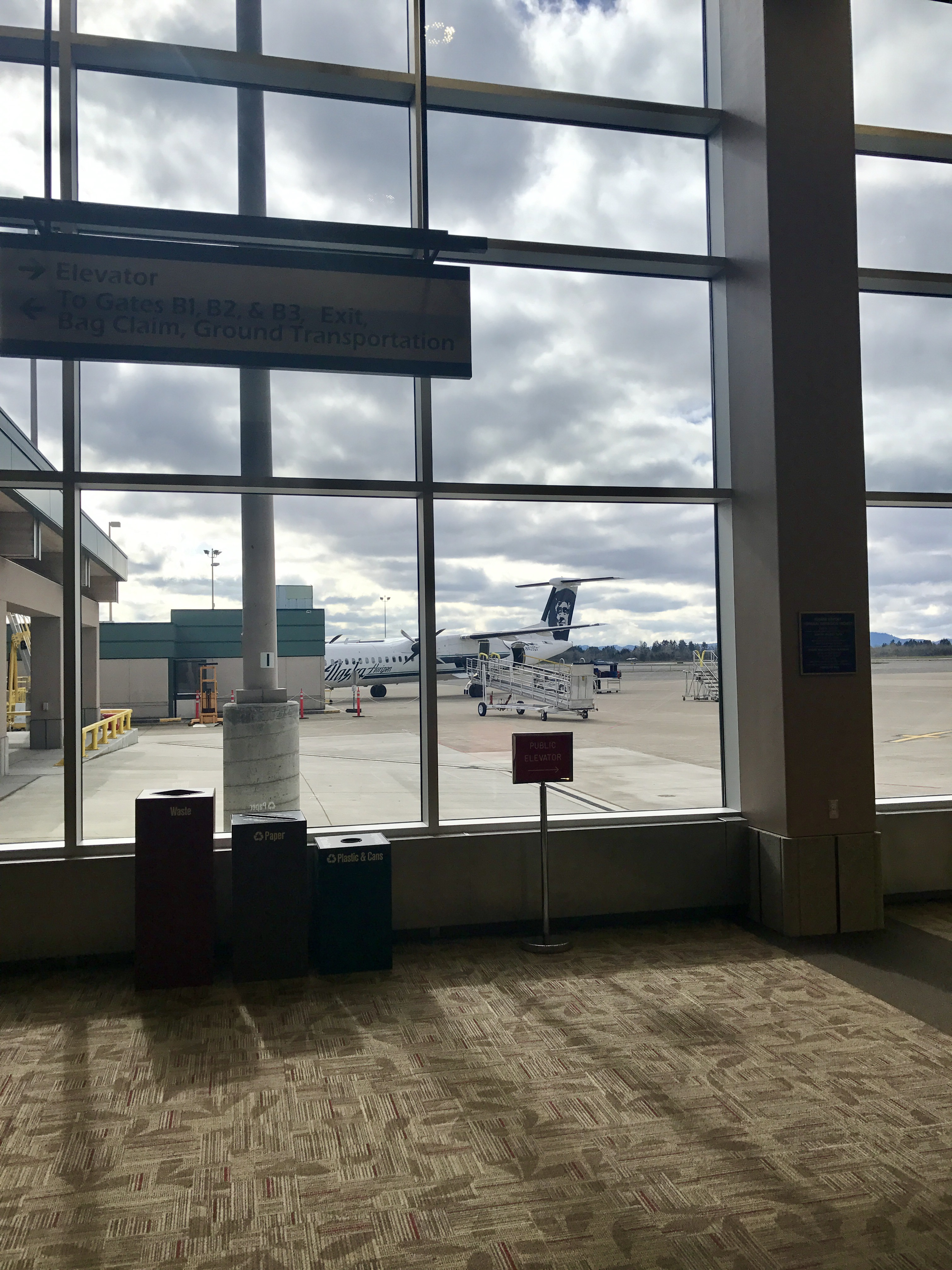
View from the "B" gate concourse

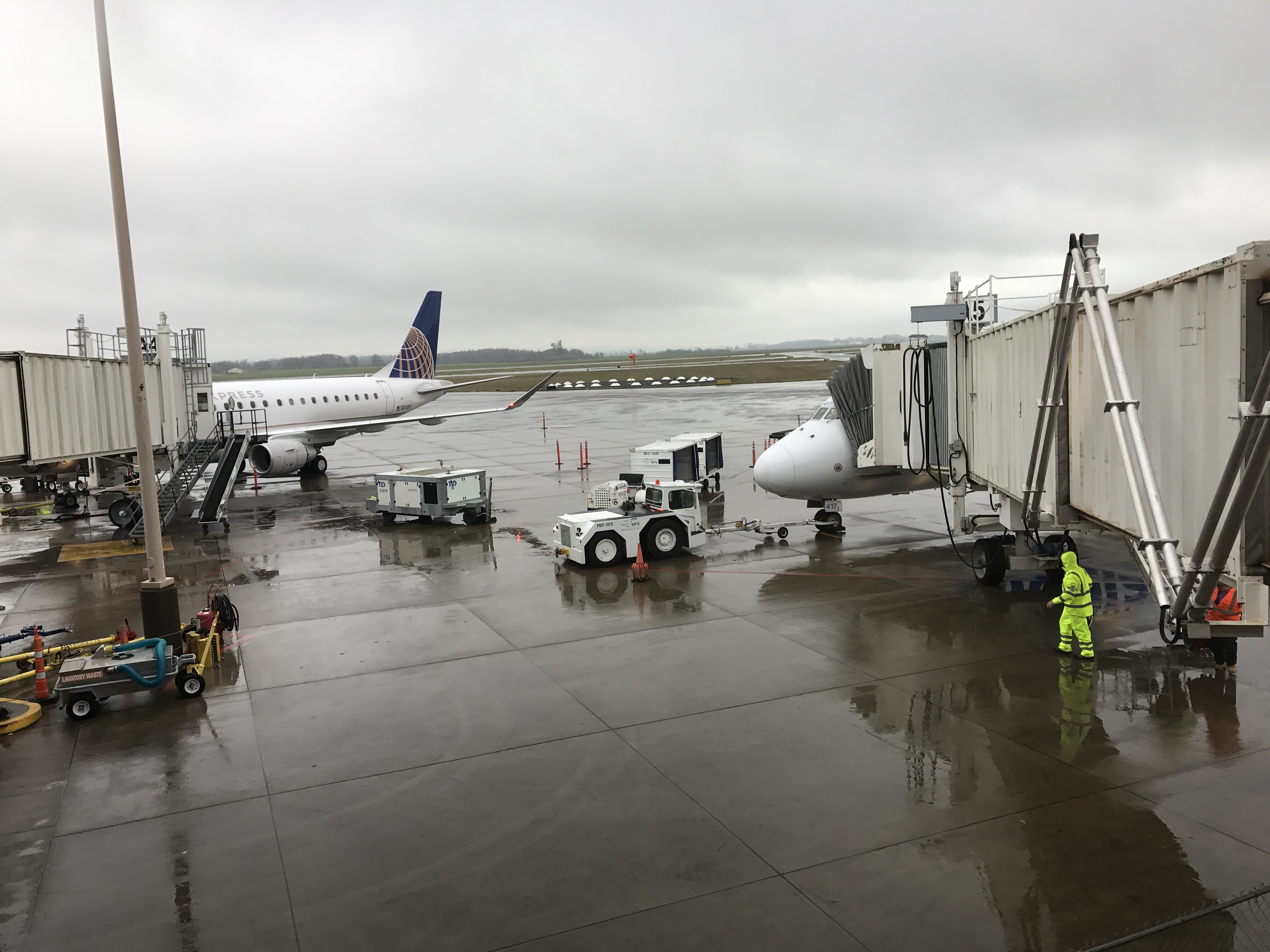
View from the "A" gate concourse

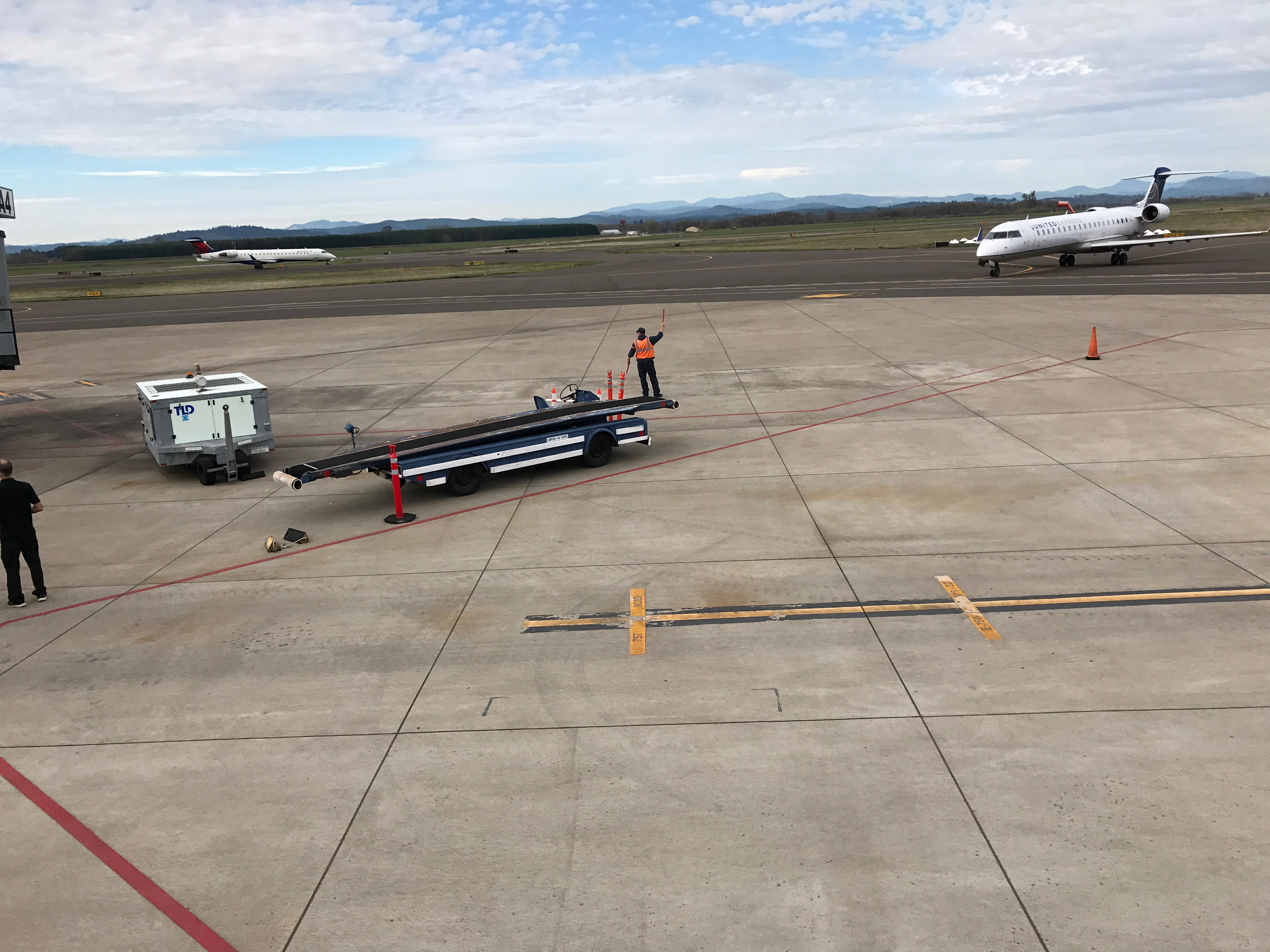
Aircraft viewed from the "A" gate concourse

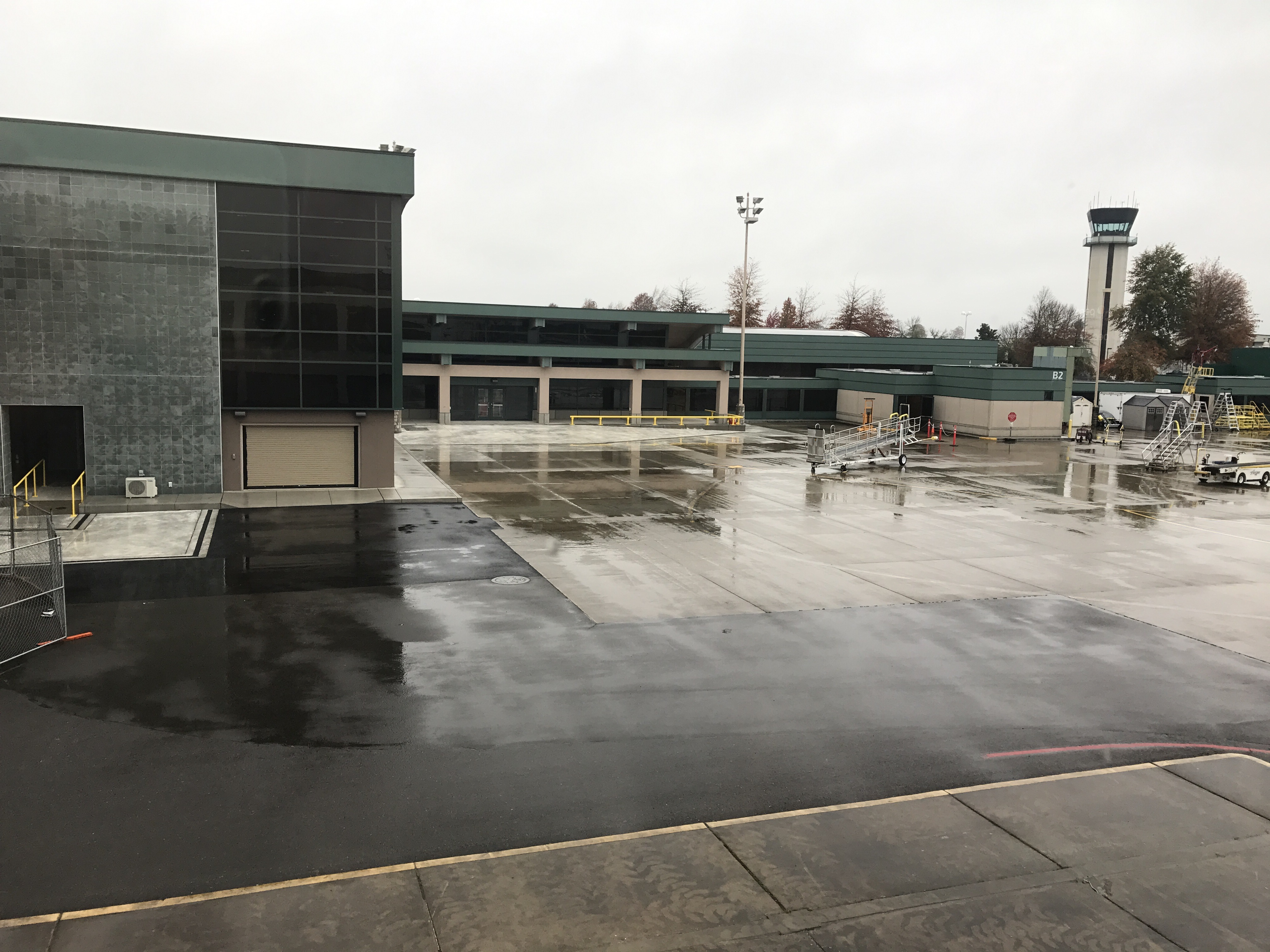
Expanded terminal and "B" gate concourse viewed from upper level

== See also ==
- Mahlon Sweet Field Heliport
- Oregon World War II Army Airfields
