= Oregon World War II Army Airfields =

Oregon World War II Army Airfields
- Part of World War II

Site information
- Type: Army Airfields

Location
- Map Of Oregon World War II Army Airfields

Site history
- Built: 1940-1944
- In use: 1940-present

Oregon World War II Army Airfields were the airfields built or repurposed during World War II for training pilots and aircrews of United States Army Air Forces (USAAF) fighters and bombers in Oregon.

Most of these airfields were under the command of Second Air Force or the Army Air Forces Training Command (AAFTC) (predecessor of the current-day United States Air Force Air Education and Training Command). However the other USAAF support commands (Air Technical Service Command (ATSC); Air Transport Command (ATC) or Troop Carrier Command) commanded a significant number of airfields in a support roles.

It is still possible to find remnants of these wartime airfields. Many were converted into municipal airports, though some were returned to agriculture and several were retained as United States Air Force installations and were front-line bases during the Cold War. Hundreds of the temporary buildings that were used survive today, and are being used for other purposes.

== Major airfields ==
Second Air Force

- Corvallis AAF, Corvallis

II Fighter Command
Also known as MAAS Corvallis / MCAAF Corvalis (temp transfer to US Navy/US Marine Corps)
Now: Corvallis Municipal Airport (IATA: CVO, ICAO: KCVO)

- Portland AAB, Portland

44th Army Air Force Base Unit
Now: Portland International Airport and Portland Air National Guard Base (IATA: PDX, ICAO: KPDX)
Joint use AAF/Navy/Civil Airport

- Redmond AAF, Redmond

Sub-base of Portland AAF
Now: Roberts Field Airport (IATA: RDM, ICAO: KRDM)

Also several auxiliary fields (Aurora Flight Strip, Eugene Municipal Airport)

Air Technical Service Command

- Madras AAF, Madras

Now: Madras Municipal Airport (was City-County Airport) (IATA: S33)

- Medford AAF, Medford

Joint use with US Navy
Now: Medford Jackson County Airport (IATA: MFR, ICAO: KMFR)

- Pendleton Field AAF, Pendleton

Spokane Air Service Command
470th Army Air Force Base Unit
Joint use with US Navy
Now: Pendleton Regional Airport (IATA: PDT, ICAO: KPDT)

- Salem AAF, Salem

Now: McNary Field Airport (IATA: SLE, ICAO: KSLE)

== See also ==
- Lists of Oregon-related topics
