= Marine Corps Auxiliary Airfield Corvallis =

Marine Corps Air Facility Corvallis
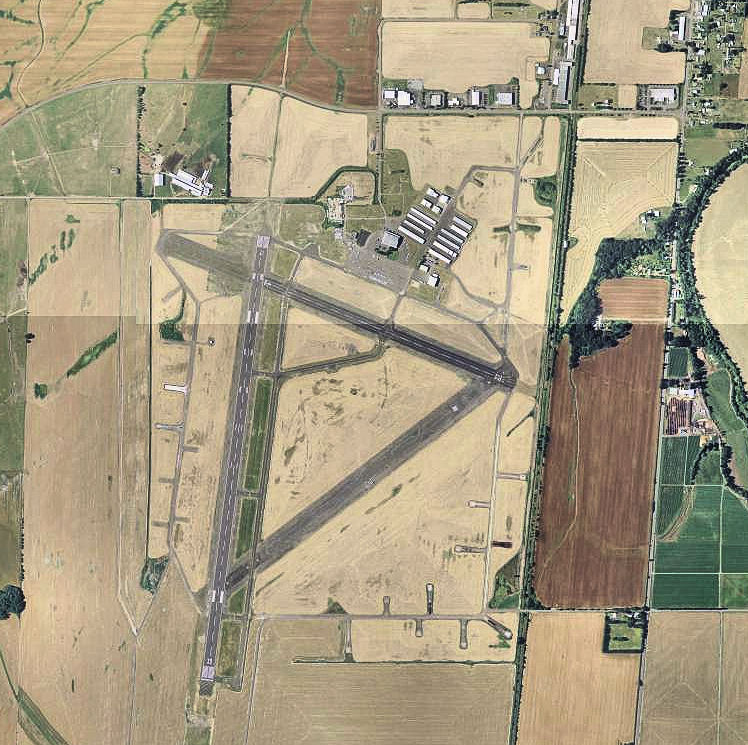
- USGS 2006 orthophoto
- IATA: none; ICAO: none

Summary
- Airport type: Military
- Owner: United States Marine Corps
- Serves: Corvallis, Oregon
- Elevation AMSL: 250 ft / 76 m
- Coordinates: 44°29′50″N 123°17′22″W

Map
- Location of airport in Oregon

Runways
Direction	Length		Surface
Direction	ft	m	Surface
17/35	5,900	1,798	Asphalt
9/27	3,545	1,081	Asphalt
- Source: Federal Aviation Administration

Marine Corps Air Facility Corvallis is a former United States Marine Corps facility located four nautical miles (5 mi, 7 km) southwest of the central business district of Corvallis, a city in Benton County, Oregon, United States.

== History ==
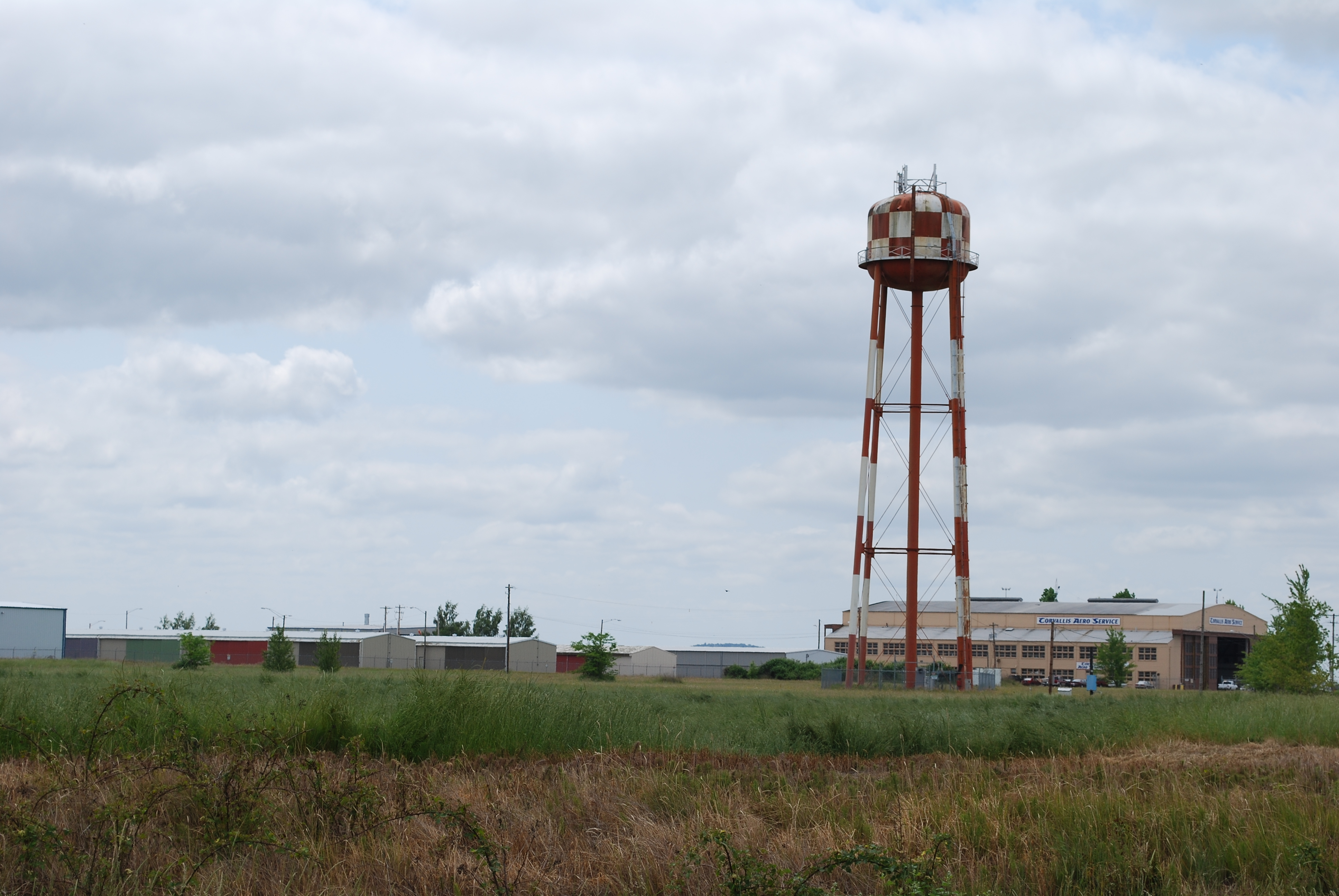
Original hangar & water tower

The site was built during World War II by the United States Army Air Forces for bomber training. The original hangar is still being used today. After its closure, it was turned over to the city and reopened as Corvallis Municipal Airport.

== See also ==
- Oregon World War II Army Airfields
- List of United States Marine Corps installations
