= Cascade Airways =

American airline

| IATA | ICAO | Call sign |
|---|---|---|
| CZ | CCD | CASCADE |
- Founded: 1969; 56 years ago
- Commenced operations: June 9, 1969; 56 years ago
- Ceased operations: March 1986; 39 years ago
- Hubs: Seattle, WA
- Destinations: 14
- Headquarters: Spokane, WA

Cascade Airways was an airline in the northwest United States which flew primarily regional air routes out of Seattle, Washington. Founded in 1969, the airline operated for 17 years and was shut down in 1986. Its IATA code (CZ) was later assigned to China Southern Airlines which was formed two years after Cascade's shutdown.

== Operations ==
Headquartered in Spokane, Washington, Cascade Airways served the northwest U.S., primarily Pasco, Pullman, Seattle, Spokane, and Yakima, Washington; Salt Lake City, Utah; Portland, Oregon; and Boise, Idaho.

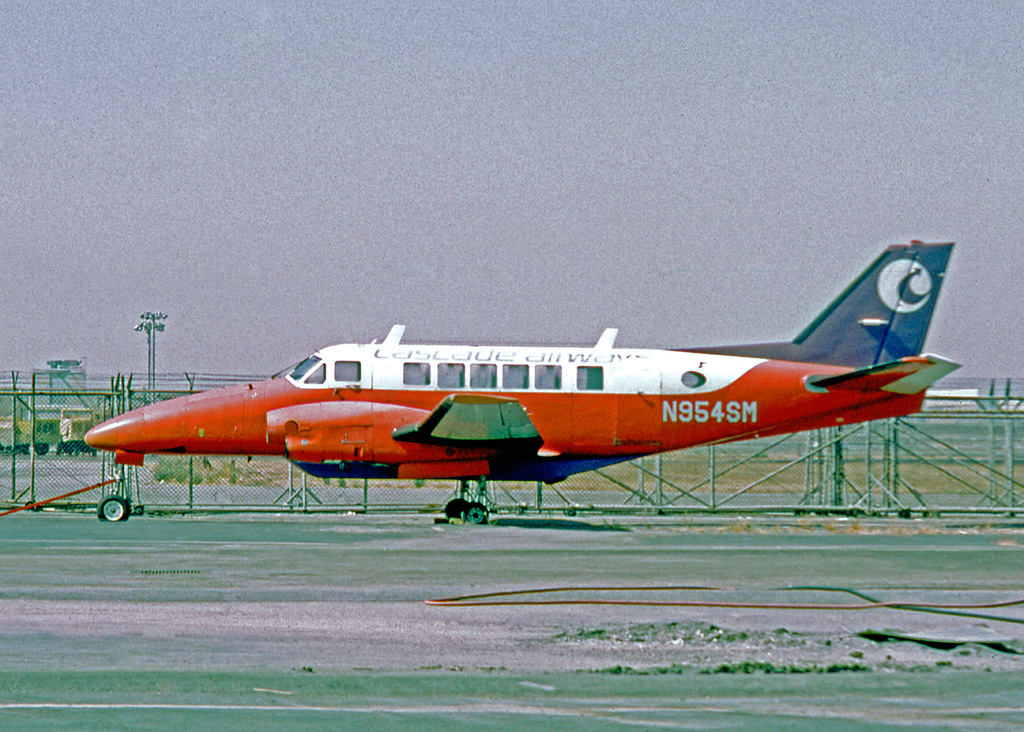
Cascade Airways Beechcraft 99 Airliner at Los Angeles in 1973

When Horizon Air began operating in 1981, Cascade was then competing against a better financed airline with Horizon Air eventually acquiring Air Oregon and Transwestern Airlines. Cascade then sought help from Horizon in 1985, but Horizon subsequently backed out of the deal and Cascade was forced to cease operations in March 1986.

Cascade introduced British Aircraft Corporation BAC One-Eleven twinjet aircraft into its fleet in the fall of 1984. The BAC One-Eleven was the only jetliner type it ever operated. Cascade was also operating Hawker Siddeley HS 748, Beechcraft 1900C, and Fairchild Swearingen Metroliner (Metro III) turboprop aircraft at this time.

== Destinations in 1984 and 1985 ==
According to its system timetables dated October 15, 1984 and April 4, 1985, Cascade was serving the following destinations. Those destinations appearing in bold typeface received BAC One-Eleven jet service. Most of the destinations that received jet service were also served with turboprop aircraft by the airline. Other destinations were served with turboprop aircraft only:

- **Boise, ID** (BOI) – **Focus city**
- Butte, MT (BTM)
- **Calgary, AB Canada** (YYC) – only international destination served by Cascade
- **Eugene, OR** (EUG)
- Helena, MT (HLN)
- **Idaho Falls, ID** (IDA)
- Kalispell, MT (FCA)
- **Lewiston, ID**/Clarkston, WA (LWS)
- **Medford, OR** (MFR)
- Moses Lake, WA (MWH)
- Olympia, WA (OLM)
- **Pasco, WA** (PSC)
- **Pocatello, ID** (PIH)
- **Portland, OR** (PDX) – **Focus city**
- Pullman, WA/Moscow, ID (PUW)
- **Reno, NV** (RNO)
- **Seattle, WA** (SEA) – **Hub**
- **Spokane, WA** (GEG) – **Focus city and headquarters**
- **Walla Walla, WA** (ALW) – location of the airline's jet and turboprop maintenance base
- Wenatchee, WA (EAT)
- Yakima, WA (YKM)

Prior to the above referenced time frame, Cascade previously served the following destinations with turboprop aircraft: Astoria, OR (AST), Missoula, MT (MSO), Salt Lake City, UT (SLC) and Twin Falls, ID (TWF).

== Fleet ==
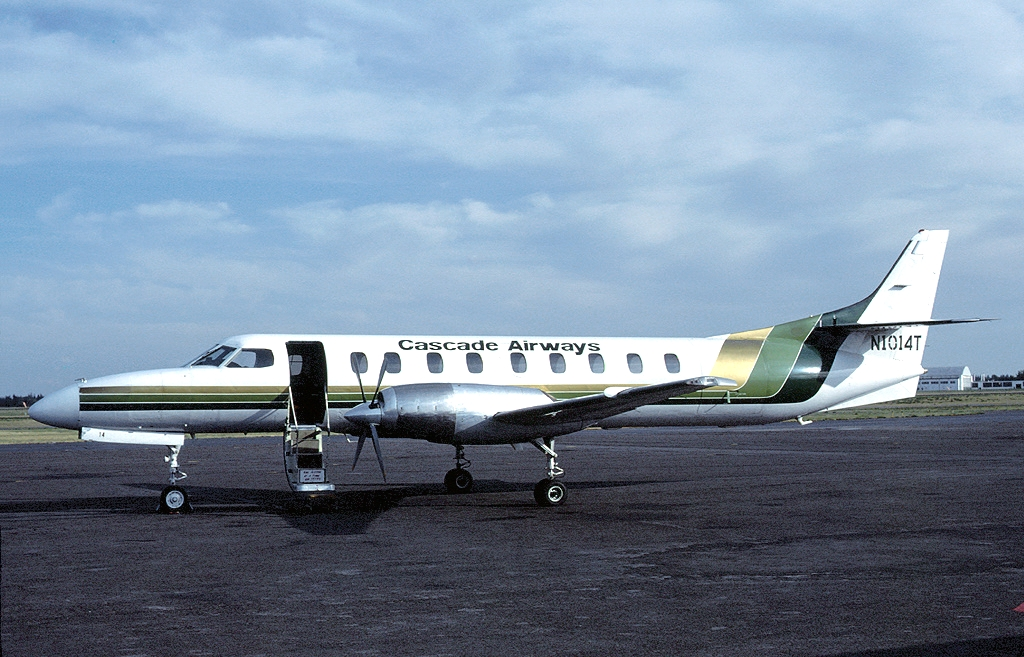
A Metro III at Spokane in 1983.

Cascade Airways operated the following aircraft types over the years:

- BAC One-Eleven series 200 jet
- BAC One-Eleven series 400 jet
- Beechcraft 1900C turboprop
- Beechcraft C99 turboprop
- Embraer EMB 110 Bandeirante turboprop
- Fairchild Swearingen Metroliner (Metro III model) turboprop
- Hawker Siddeley HS 748 turboprop – the 48-passenger HS 748 was the largest turboprop aircraft ever operated by Cascade.

== Accidents and incidents ==
On January 20, 1981, Cascade Airways Flight 201, Beech 99 N390CA, operating Seattle-Yakima-Moses Lake-Spokane, crashed at 11:27 am PST in fog during its approach to Spokane International Airport. Of the nine aboard, seven were killed: five passengers and the cockpit crew, Captain David Weinberger and First Officer Paul Davis. Two passengers, Steven Tarnoff and James Eagle. survived the crash, explosion, and fire. It clipped Riddle Hill and crashed into the wooded hillside 4.5 miles (7 km) southwest of the airport; the NTSB investigation resulted in a determination of pilot error due to the crew using an incorrect frequency for a navigational aid and subsequently descending below the Minimum Descent Height for that approach to the airport. At the time of the crash, Cascade operated twelve Beech 99s and three Embraer Bandeirantes to eighteen cities in the Pacific Northwest.

Cascade had previously acquired Richland-based Columbia Pacific Airlines in November 1978, following a fatal crash of a Columbia Pacific Beech 99. Flight 23 over-rotated and stalled on take-off from the Richland Airport on February 10, 1978, killing both pilots and all 15 passengers.

On February 18, 1972, Cascade Airways Flight 325, a Beech 99 operating Seattle-Walla Walla-Pullman-Spokane, crashed in fog at 9:42 pm PST during its instrument approach to Spokane International Airport, and came to rest in a muddy field less than two miles (3 km) southwest of the runway. Two passengers and two crew were aboard, and all survived with minor injuries. The pilot, Lee M. Leslie of Spokane, walked from the crash site to a nearby service station to report it. The crash site was about 200 yards (180 m) from the Medical Lake exit (#272) of Interstate 90 and the landing gear of the plane was extended. Due to fog, the flight had stopped in Pasco rather than Walla Walla.

On June 20, 1969, less than two weeks after commencing flights, Cascade Airways Beech 99 N2550A, operating on a cargo flight with no passengers lost power on takeoff and crashed at Pasco Airport, killing both crew members. The pilot was company vice president Vaughn Gundlach, age 35, and the co-pilot was Doug Thomson, age 24.

== See also ==
- List of defunct airlines of the United States
