= Yakima Air Terminal =

Airport in Washington, United States

McAllister Field
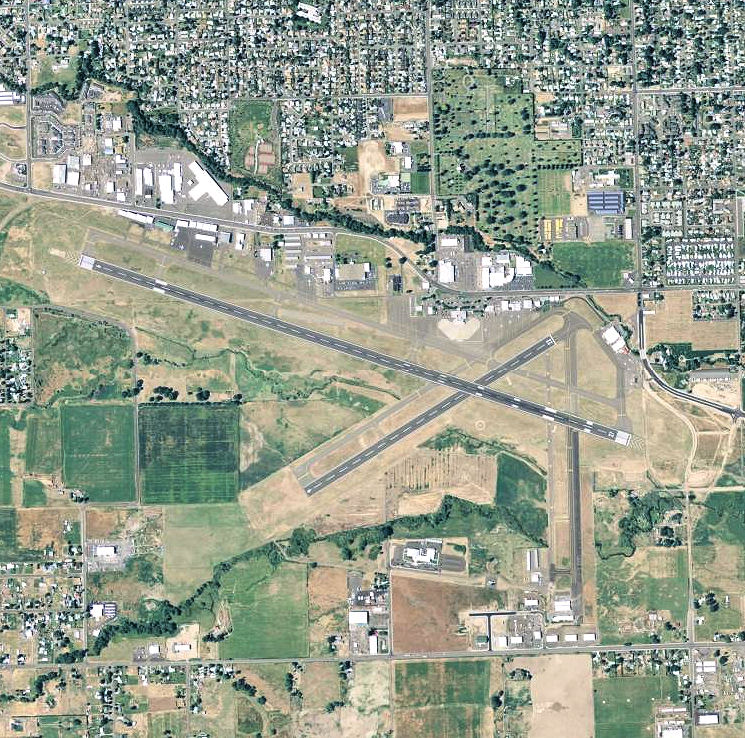
- USGS 2006 orthophoto
- IATA: YKM; ICAO: KYKM; FAA LID: YKM

Summary
- Airport type: Public
- Owner: City of Yakima
- Serves: Yakima, Washington
- Elevation AMSL: 1,099 ft / 335 m
- Coordinates: 46°34′05″N 120°32′39″W
- Website: FLYYKM.com

Maps
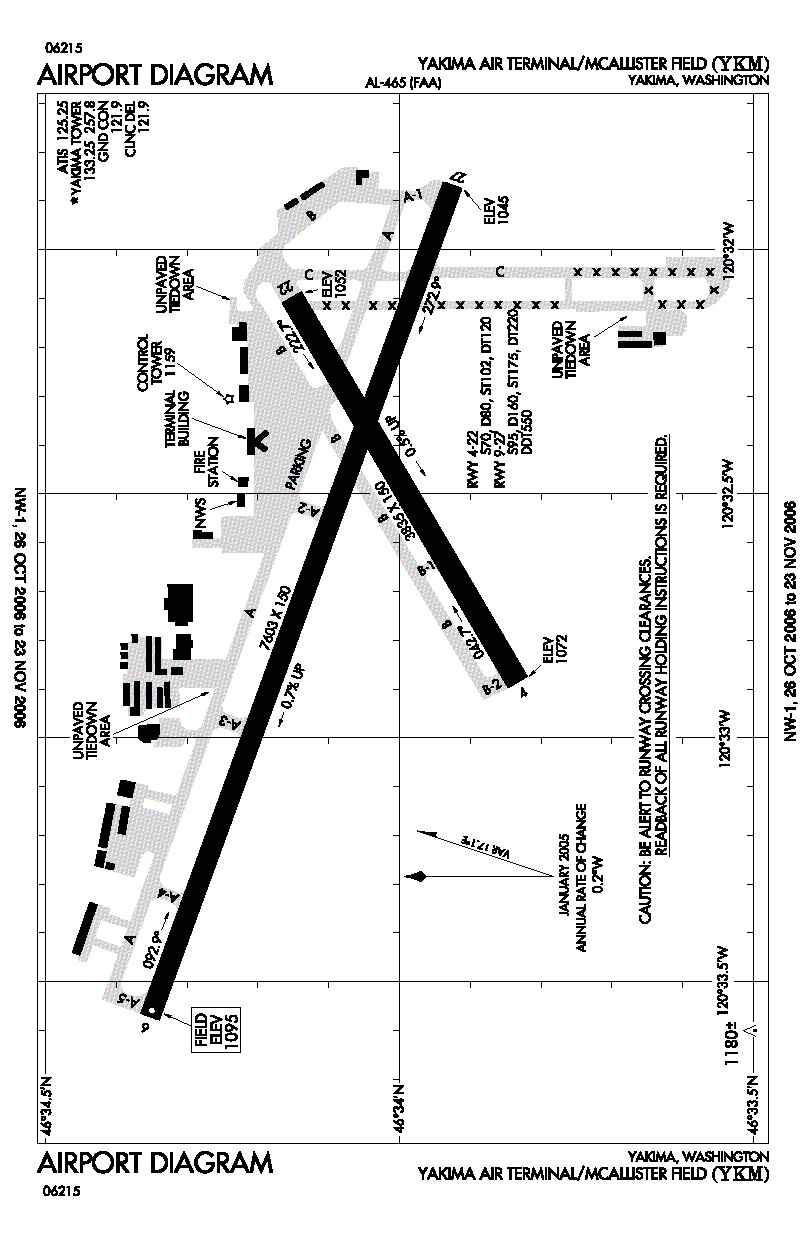
- FAA airport diagram

- Location in Washington YKM (the United States)

Runways
Direction	Length		Surface
Direction	ft	m	Surface
09/27	7,604	2,318	Asphalt
04/22	3,835	1,169	Asphalt

Statistics (2022)
- Aircraft operations: 35,588
- Based aircraft: 133
- Source: Federal Aviation Administration

McAllister Field (IATA: YKM, ICAO: KYKM, FAA LID: YKM) (known for the Yakima Air Terminal) is a public airport three miles south of Yakima, in Yakima County, Washington. Owned by the City of Yakima, it is used for general aviation and commercial air service. Yakima is served by one scheduled passenger air carrier (Alaska Airlines with service to Seattle/Tacoma International Airport) and two non-scheduled carriers (Sun Country Airlines and Xtra Airways). Sun Country Airlines operates charter flights to Laughlin, NV and Xtra Airways operates charter flights to Wendover, NV.

This airport is in the National Plan of Integrated Airport Systems for 2011–2015, which called it as a primary commercial service airport. Federal Aviation Administration records say the airport had 36,383 passenger boardings (enplanements) in calendar year 2022, 57,076 in 2014, 60,028 in 2009 and 53,832 in 2010.

== History ==
The airfield first officially operated in 1926 (Goodman’s pasture had been in use unofficially before 1928) in an 80 acre field cleared from sagebrush with a runway added in 1932. During World War II the airfield was used by the United States Army Air Forces.

=== Historical airline service ===
Northwest Airlines was serving the airport in 1939 with a daily roundtrip Portland, OR - Yakima - Spokane flight operated with a Douglas DC-3. By the early and mid 1960s, Northwest was operating daily, no change of plane Lockheed L-188 Electra propjet service from Yakima to the U.S. east coast via a number of intermediate stops as well as nonstop Electra service to Seattle/Tacoma International Airport (SEA), Portland (PDX) and Spokane (GEG). In early 1962, Northwest was operating a daily eastbound Seattle - Yakima - Spokane - Great Falls, MT - Billings, MT - Bismarck, ND - Minneapolis/St. Paul - Milwaukee - Detroit - New York City (via Newark Airport) flight with an Electra. By late 1965, Northwest was operating a daily eastbound Seattle - Yakima - Spokane - Missoula, MT - Helena, MT - Butte, MT - Bozeman, MT - Billings - Fargo, ND - Minneapolis/St. Paul - Washington D.C. National Airport flight also with an Electra. Northwest was continuing to serve the airport in early 1966 with daily nonstop Electra propjet service to Seattle/Tacoma, Portland, OR and Spokane as well as direct, no change of plane Electra service to Billings, Minneapolis/St. Paul, Washington, D.C. and other destinations; however, the airline was no longer serving Yakima by late 1966.

West Coast Airlines was serving Yakima in 1954 with nine daily Douglas DC-3 departures from the airport with flights to Seattle Boeing Field (BFI), Portland, OR, Spokane, Baker, OR, Coeur d'Alene, ID, Ellensburg, WA, Ephrata, WA, La Grande, OR, Lewiston, ID, Ontario, OR, Pasco, WA, Pendleton, OR, Pullman, WA and Walla Walla, WA. By the spring of 1968, West Coast was operating Douglas DC-9-10 jet service nonstop from the airport to Seattle Boeing Field, Portland and Pasco as well as direct, no change of plane DC-9 jet flights to San Francisco (SFO), Spokane, Eugene and Medford in addition to flying Fairchild F-27 turboprop service to a number of regional destinations.

West Coast Airlines then merged with Bonanza Air Lines and Pacific Air Lines to form Air West which was subsequently renamed Hughes Airwest. In the summer of 1968, Air West was operating Douglas DC-9-10 and McDonnell Douglas DC-9-30 jet service from the airport nonstop to Portland, OR and Pasco as well as direct DC-9 service to San Francisco (SFO), Spokane, Eugene, Medford, San Jose, CA, Fresno and Las Vegas in addition to nonstop Fairchild F-27 turboprop flights to Seattle Boeing Field (BFI) with nonstop and direct F-27 service to other regional destinations. In 1975, Hughes Airwest was operating all of its flights from the airport with Douglas DC-9-10 and McDonnell Douglas DC-9-30 jets with nonstop service to Seattle/Tacoma International Airport (SEA) and Pasco in addition to direct, no change of plane DC-9 jet flights to Los Angeles (LAX), Orange County Airport near Santa Ana, CA, Salt Lake City, Phoenix, Tucson, Portland, OR, Santa Maria, CA and Eugene and was also operating direct, no change of plane DC-9 service to two international destinations: Guadalajara, Mexico and Mazatlan, Mexico. Also in 1975, Cascade Airways, a commuter air carrier, was operating nonstop Beechcraft 99 turboprop flights to Yakima from Seattle/Tacoma, Portland, OR, Spokane, Pullman, WA and Wenatchee, WA.

Hughes Airwest was then acquired by and merged into Republic Airlines in 1980. In late 1980, Republic was operating McDonnell Douglas DC-9-30 jet service from the airport nonstop to Seattle/Tacoma and Pasco as well as direct, no change of plane DC-9-30 jet flights to San Francisco, Los Angeles, Denver, Boise and Eugene. However, by the summer of 1982 Republic was no longer serving Yakima.

Horizon Air began serving the airport on September 1, 1981, as a new independent regional air carrier with nonstop Fairchild F-27 turboprop service to Seattle/Tacoma (SEA) with Yakima being the first destination served by Horizon. By early 1985 Horizon Air was operating F-27 turboprops as well as smaller Fairchild Swearingen Metroliner propjets into the airport with nonstop flights from Seattle/Tacoma, Portland, OR, Pasco and Pullman while Cascade Airways was operating its flights with Beechcraft 1900C and larger Hawker Siddeley HS 748 turboprops with nonstop service from Seattle/Tacoma, Portland, OR, Spokane, Lewiston, ID, Moses Lake, WA, Pasco, Pullman, WA and Walla Walla, WA. According to the Official Airline Guide (OAG), Cascade and Horizon were operating a combined total of thirteen nonstop flights a day on weekdays from Seattle/Tacoma to Yakima in February 1985. Horizon Air was then acquired by Alaska Airlines in November 1986 as a wholly owned subsidiary and continues to currently serve Yakima with Alaska Airlines branded service.

Jet service had returned to Yakima by early 1988 when Pacific Southwest Airlines (PSA) was operating twice daily direct service to San Francisco with both flights making an intermediate stop in Pasco with one of these flights then continuing on from SFO to Orange County Airport in southern California. That same year, PSA was acquired by and merged into USAir which in late 1988 was operating McDonnell Douglas MD-80 jetliners twice a day nonstop from Seattle/Tacoma with both of these flights originating in San Francisco with twice daily jet service from SFO to Yakima thus being flown on a direct one stop basis. At this same time, both Horizon Air (operating code sharing service on behalf of Alaska Airlines) and United Express (operated by North Pacific Airlines on a code sharing basis on behalf of United Airlines) were also operating nonstop flights from Seattle/Tacoma to the airport, Horizon Air with de Havilland Canada DHC-8 Dash 8 and Fairchild Swearingen Metroliner propjets, and United Express with British Aerospace BAe Jetstream 31 propjets with both air carriers also operating nonstop service from Portland, OR to Yakima at this time. According to the OAG, Horizon Air, United Express and USAir were operating a combined total of 19 nonstop flights every weekday from Seattle/Tacoma to Yakima in late 1988. However, USAir was no longer operating jet service into Yakima by the summer of 1989.

During the early and mid 1990s, both Horizon Air (on behalf of Alaska Airlines) and United Express (operated by WestAir Commuter Airlines on behalf of United Airlines) continued to serve Yakima primarily with nonstop flights operated with twin turboprop aircraft from Seattle/Tacoma with Horizon operating nonstop turboprop service from Portland, OR as well. In the spring of 1995, Horizon Air was operating all of its nonstop flights from Seattle/Tacoma to Yakima with Dornier 328 propjets while United Express was operating all of its flights from SEA to the airport with British Aerospace BAe Jetstream 31 propjets. By June 1999, Horizon Air was operating all of its flights to Seattle/Tacoma (SEA) with de Havilland Canada DHC-8 Dash 8 turboprops while United Express (operated by SkyWest Airlines on behalf of United Airlines) was operating all of its flights to SEA with Embraer EMB-120 Brasilia turboprops with a combined total of 16 daily nonstop flights operated by the two air carriers from the airport to Seattle/Tacoma at this time.

As of 2023, the airport has two daily passenger flights to Seattle–Tacoma International Airport operated by Alaska Airlines by their affiliate Horizon Air. The airport has entered discussions with Allegiant Airlines and Avelo Airlines to establish a flight to Las Vegas in the future.

== Facilities and aircraft ==
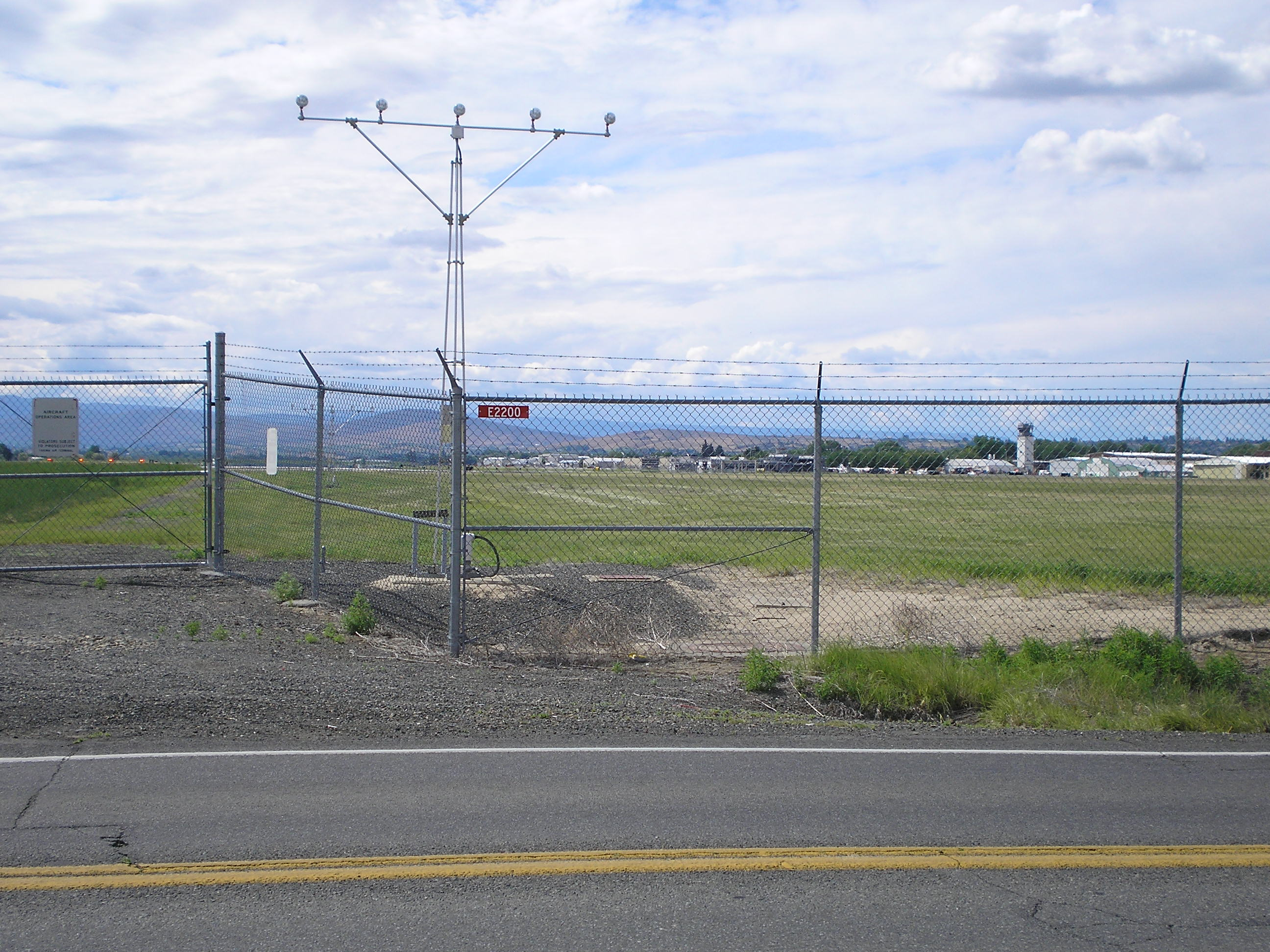
Photograph of McAllister Field in Yakima taken from the east in June 2006

McAllister Field covers 825 acres (334 ha) at an elevation of 1,099 feet (335 m) above mean sea level. It has two asphalt runways: 9/27 is 7,604 by 150 feet (2,318 x 46 m) and 4/22 is 3,835 by 150 feet (1,169 x 46 m). The Yakima Air Terminal is equipped with a contract Air Traffic Control Tower, operated by SERCO under a contract with the FAA. The tower operates daily from 0600 to 2200.

In the year ending December 31, 2022, the airport had 35,588 aircraft operations, average 97 per day, 80% general aviation, 10% military, 7% air taxi and 3% airline. 133 aircraft were then based at this airport, 106 single-engine, 15 multi-engine, 5 jet, 6 helicopters and 1 glider.

The airport is home to Cub Crafters, a manufacturer of light sport and light utility aircraft. The airport has one full-service fixed-base operator (FBO), McCormick Air Center, which provides hangar leasing, aircraft rental, flight instruction, and fuel. The airport has one aviation museum known as McAllister Air Museum.

Yakima Air Terminal is designated as the primary diversion site for flights unable to reach Seattle–Tacoma International Airport. In December 2023, an Airbus A330 on an international Delta Air Lines flight from London Heathrow Airport landed at Yakima due to heavy fog in the Seattle area. It was the largest commercial airliner to land at the airport; due to the lack of customs facilities, passengers were processed by officials who arrived from Western Washington by car. Yakima has been proposed as a potential reliever airport for the Seattle area by local officials.

== Airlines and destinations ==
=== Passenger ===
Airlines	Destinations
Alaska Airlines	Seattle/Tacoma

Destinations Map
Destinations from Yakima Air Terminal

== See also ==
- List of airports in Washington
