= Horizon Air =

Regional airline in the western United States

- Embraer 175 operated on behalf of Alaska Airlines
IATA	ICAO	Call sign
QX	QXE	HORIZON AIR
- Founded: May 1981; 45 years ago
- Commenced operations: September 1, 1981; 45 years ago
- AOC #: QXEA002A
- Hubs: Portland (OR); Seattle/Tacoma
- Frequent-flyer program: Atmos Rewards
- Alliance: Oneworld (affiliate)
- Fleet size: 49
- Destinations: 46
- Parent company: Alaska Air Group
- Headquarters: SeaTac, Washington, U.S.
- Key people: Ben Minicucci (Alaska Air Group CEO); Andy Schneider (Horizon Air CEO and President)
- Employees: 3,337 (2024)

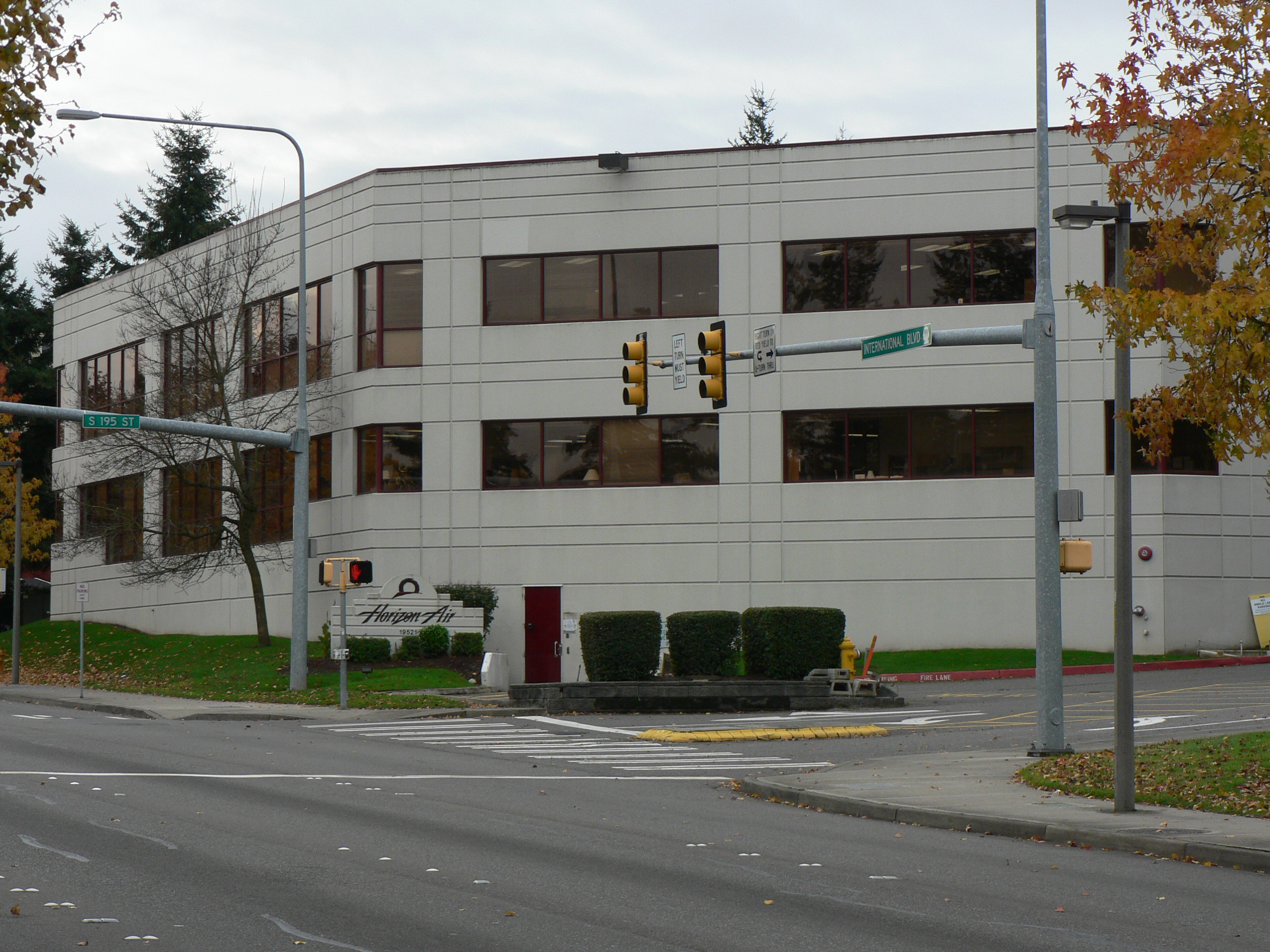
Horizon Air General Office

Horizon Air is an American regional airline headquartered in SeaTac, Washington, United States, within the Seattle metropolitan area. It is a wholly owned subsidiary of the Alaska Air Group, and it is paid by fellow group member Alaska Airlines to staff, operate, and maintain aircraft used on flights that are scheduled, marketed, and sold by Alaska Airlines. Planes operated by Horizon are co-branded as Alaska Horizon to differentiate Horizon's planes from those operated by Alaska's other regional airline partner, SkyWest Airlines.

Horizon Air started operations in September 1981, was purchased by the Alaska Air Group in November 1986, and continued to fly as a separately branded airline until 2011, when it shifted to the current capacity purchase agreement business model.

The airline is headquartered in the Seattle suburb of SeaTac, not far from Seattle–Tacoma International Airport, and the airline's primary maintenance base is at Portland International Airport. Horizon also considers Seattle–Tacoma and Portland airports its hubs.

== History ==
Horizon Air was formed in May 1981 by Milt Kuolt, Joe Clark, and Bruce McCaw, with initial plans to fly to Hawaii but later changed to serve Washington state. The airline started operations on September 1, 1981, with three Fairchild F-27 aircraft. Its headquarters were in an area that is now within SeaTac, Washington.

Horizon Air's first route connected Yakima to Seattle–Tacoma International Airport and was followed a week later by Tri-Cities Airport in Pasco to Seattle. The general offices of Horizon Air were operated out of an old house behind Sea-Tac Airport. Horizon acquired Air Oregon on June 17, 1982, after both airlines were losing hundreds of thousands of dollars monthly, in order to consolidate and reduce their operating deficit. Horizon agreed to purchase Transwestern Airlines of Utah in September 1983, once again to try to reduce operating deficit of the airline.

A single Fokker F28 twin jet, purchased in July 1984 from an African carrier, was the first jet owned by Horizon Air (however, the first jet operated by Horizon was a wet leased Douglas DC-9-10).

An initial public offering occurred in 1985 to secure operating capital, which after only one profitable year since founding, was needed to keep the airline afloat. That summer, Horizon entered into its first codeshare agreement with United Airlines, and on September 8, Horizon signed an agreement with de Havilland Canada to begin purchasing the airline's first brand new aircraft, the de Havilland Canada Dash 8-100 twin turboprop.

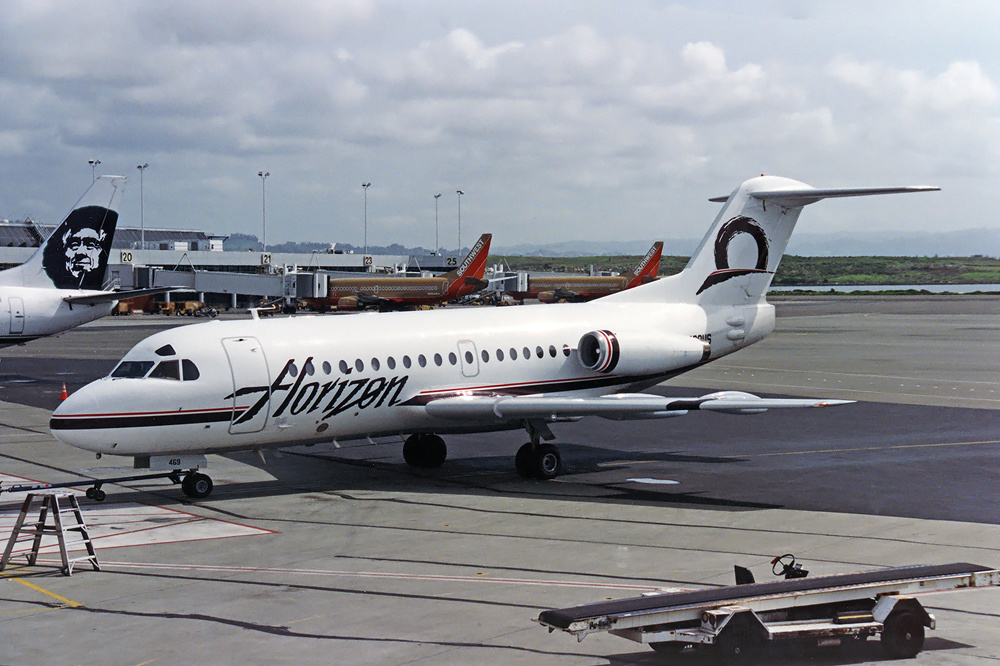
Fokker F28 at Oakland International Airport in 1995

Late in 1985, Horizon entered into an agreement to purchase their chief competitor in Washington, Cascade Airways, but by early 1986 were released from the agreement. Merger talks between the two had begun in late 1982.

In January 1986, the airline became an international carrier when it began service to Calgary, Alberta, in association with Cascade Airways.

=== Acquisition ===
Alaska Airlines struck a deal to acquire Horizon Air in November 1986. The year before, Alaska had undergone a major corporate restructuring with the airline now being owned by the Alaska Air Group, an airline holding company. Under the agreement, the Alaska Air Group became the owner of Horizon Air after approval by the Transportation Department in late December. The Alaska Air Group continued to operate Horizon as a separately branded airline, with a codesharing agreement with its new sister airline, Alaska, while ending its codeshare with United Airlines.

In 1988, Horizon signed a code share agreement with Northwest Airlines.

International service was expanded in May 1989 with flights to Vancouver and Victoria in British Columbia, using both Dash 8-100 and Fairchild Metroliner turboprop aircraft.

Horizon was the launch customer for the Dornier 328 turboprop, intending to replace the Metroliners with this new aircraft which promised speed and comfort on par with jetliners. In recognition of the order, Dornier painted its second prototype of the 328 in Horizon colors. Twelve aircraft were delivered between November 1993 and November 1995, but they were quickly phased out in late 1997, along with the remaining Metroliners, in favor of fleet standardization to the Dash 8 series of turboprops.

Throughout its history, Horizon has either operated as a standalone carrier or as a regional affiliate of Alaska Airlines, except between 2004 and 2007 when it operated Bombardier CRJ700 aircraft on behalf of Frontier Airlines.

=== Brand phase-out ===
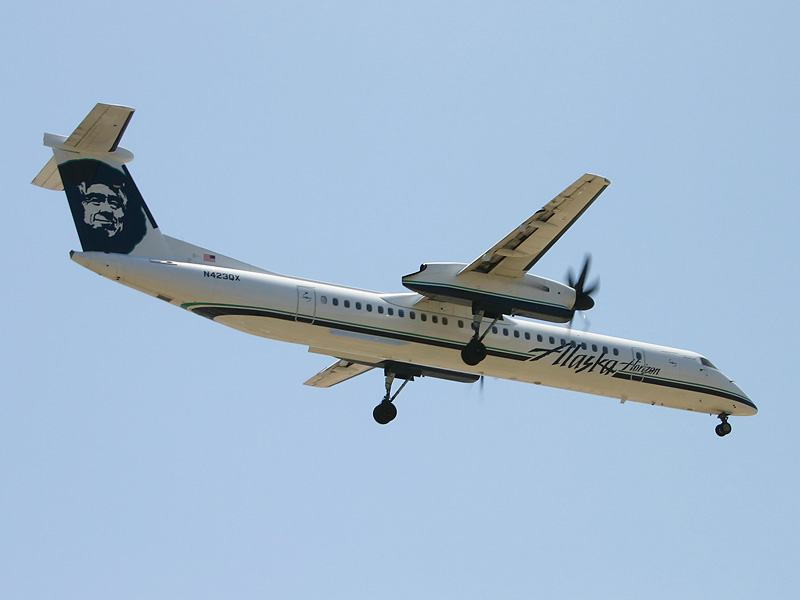
Bombardier Q400 in Alaska Airlines' livery, shortly after the retirement of the Horizon Air brand in 2011

In late 2010, Horizon's parent company, the Alaska Air Group, made the decision to no longer operate Horizon as a separate regional airline. Starting on January 1, 2011, Horizon shifted to a capacity purchase agreement (CPA) business model, which had by that time become the regional airline industry standard. Under the CPA, Horizon operates and maintains its aircraft, while Alaska Airlines is responsible for scheduling, marketing and pricing all flights. As part of the change to the new business model, the Horizon Air brand was retired and all Horizon planes were repainted with a co-branded "Alaska HORIZON" livery.

Alaska Airlines entered into a similar capacity purchase agreement with SkyWest Airlines in May 2011. As part of the agreement, Alaska Air Group managers agreed to sell Horizon's fleet of five Bombardier CRJ700 regional jet aircraft to SkyWest, which used the aircraft to operate six West Coast routes as "Alaska SkyWest". The move left Horizon with a fleet consisting of a single type of aircraft; the Bombardier Q400 turboprop.

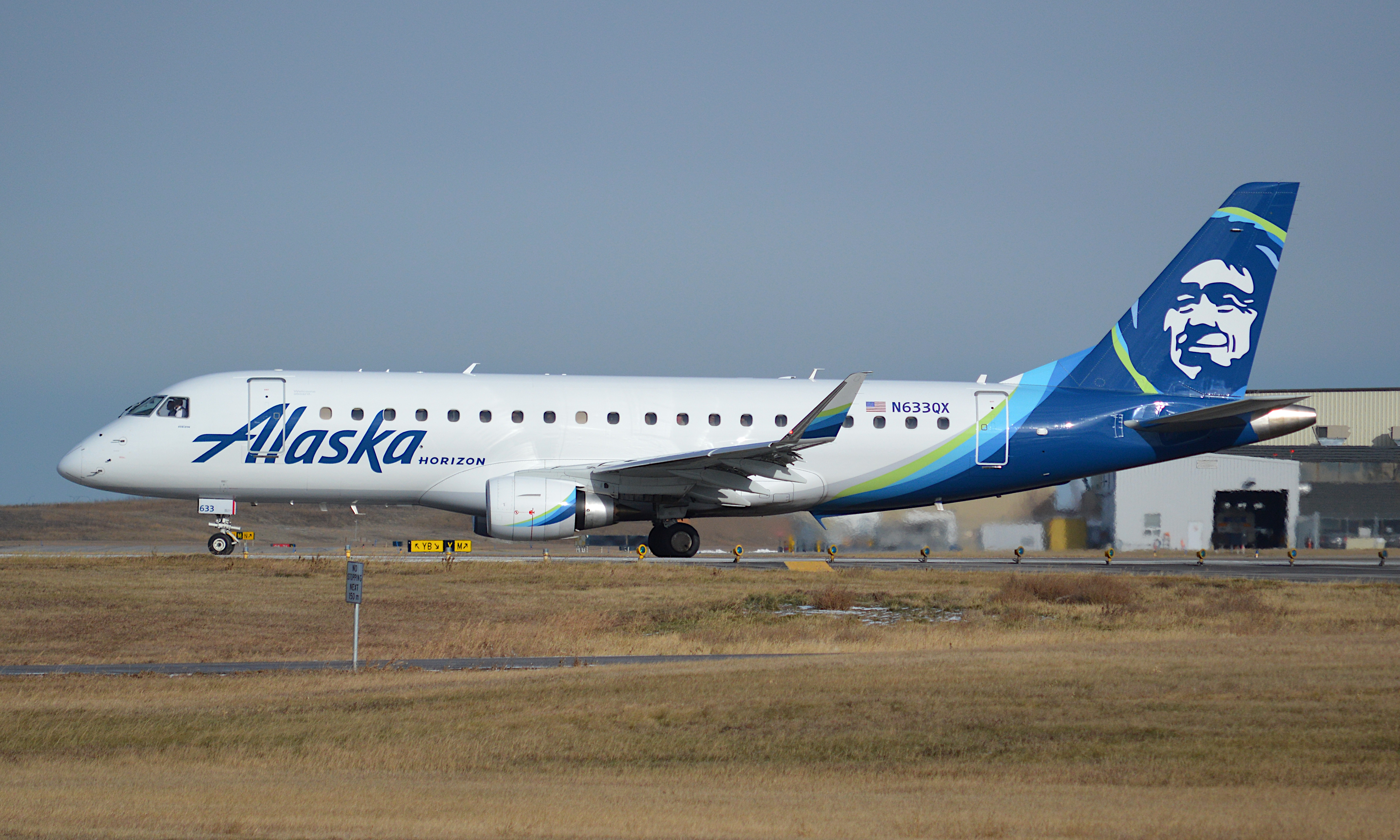
Horizon Air Embraer 175 in Alaska Airlines' livery

Horizon announced in April 2016 that it would expand its fleet and once again operate regional jets, placing an order for 30 Embraer 175 airplanes.

The airline experienced a period of turmoil in 2017. Amid unprecedented growth (spurred by the addition of the new aircraft), Horizon experienced a severe pilot shortage, forcing the airline to cancel hundreds of flights and delay delivery of new aircraft. The pilot shortage was part of a broader problem affecting all regional airlines, but hit Horizon particularly hard. After the airline industry started to rebound in 2013 after a decade long downturn, mainline air carriers started to hire pilots, mostly from regional carriers which offer low wages and limited opportunities for advancement. More experienced regional carrier pilots moved to higher paying mainlines. Horizon responded with drastically increased pay for flight crews and worked with Alaska, its sister airline, to create more opportunities for advancement. As a result, there is an influx of new, young pilots with less experience.

In response to the crisis, Alaska shifted some of its flights from Horizon to its other regional partner, SkyWest Airlines. It was a move that Horizon's CEO described as "disheartening." Because of the shift, SkyWest ordered additional Embraer 175 airplanes that it will fly for Alaska.

At the end of the troubled year, Horizon's CEO Dave Campbell announced that he would step down effective January 5, 2018, for personal reasons. Gary Beck became CEO in January 2018. In November 2019, former retiree of the company Joe Sprague returned to Horizon Air as president.

== Destinations ==
Horizon's 45 destinations are located in the U.S. states of Alaska, Arizona, California, Colorado, Idaho, Kansas, Minnesota, Montana, Nevada, New Mexico, Oregon, Texas, Utah, and Washington as well as the Canadian provinces of Alberta and British Columbia.

== Services ==
=== On-board meals and beverages ===
Flight time permitting, passengers in the main cabin are offered a complimentary small snack (cookie, nuts or a snack mix) and a beverage.

Horizon, like its parent airline Alaska, focuses on serving and selling items produced on and inspired by the West Coast. Coffee from Portland-based Stumptown Coffee Roasters is served on all flights.

Horizon's aircraft are equipped with a First Class cabin and Premium Class cabin and offer a similar onboard experience to that of Alaska, with complimentary meals in First Class and complimentary alcoholic beverages in both classes.

=== On-board Internet access ===
Horizon aircraft are equipped with an in-flight Wi-Fi system. Horizon uses Starlink, a satellite-based internet service, covering all routes served by the airline. The service is complimentary for Atmos Rewards members and is sponsored by T-Mobile.

== Fleet ==
=== Current fleet ===
As of August 2026, Horizon Air operates the following aircraft:

Aircraft	In service	Orders	Passengers				Notes
Aircraft	In service	Orders	F	Y+	Y	Total	Notes
Embraer 175	49	1	12	16	48	76	Deliveries until 2026.
Total	49	1					

The Embraer 175 is a regional jet operated in a three-class configuration (first class, premium class, and main cabin) with a total of 76 all leather, reclining seats. The premium class and main cabin sections of the aircraft have two seats either side of the aisle, while the first class section has a single seat on one side of the aisle and two seats on the other.

=== Former fleet ===
Horizon Air has previously operated the following aircraft:

Aircraft	Total	Introduced	Retired	Notes
Bombardier CRJ700	21	2001	2011	regional jet
De Havilland Canada Dash 8-Series 400	52	2001	2023	turboprop
De Havilland Canada Dash 8-200	28	1997	2011	turboprop
De Havilland Canada Dash 8-100	24	1985	2006	turboprop
Fokker F-27	13	1981	1988	turboprop, first aircraft type operated by the airline
Dornier 328	12	1993	1997	turboprop
Fairchild Metroliner II	Unknown	Unknown	Unknown	formerly operated by Air Oregon, commuter turboprop
Fairchild Metroliner III	33	Unknown	1997	commuter turboprop
Fokker F28	22	1986	2003	regional jet
McDonnell Douglas DC-9-10	1	1984	1984	first jet aircraft type operated by the airline

=== Aircraft livery ===
At the start of the carrier, Horizon livery had a painted sunrise with a small beach with capitalized words saying "Horizon". Until 2011, the Horizon Air livery was very similar to that of its parent, Alaska Airlines, except for a dark red (rather than blue) cheatline, and the tail featured a stylized sunset logo, rather than an Eskimo. Two E175s are currently painted in special liveries. Some Dash 8-100s and Q200s (no longer in service with Horizon Air) had names of various destinations preceded by "Great City of" or "Great Cities of" printed on the front of the airplane. The first Dash 8-100, N811PH was dedicated as the "Great Cities of Seattle/Tacoma" and the second airplane, N812PH was the "Great City of Portland". N824PH was dedicated as the "Great Cities of Pullman/Moscow" on one side and the "Great Cities of Moscow/Pullman" on the other side. N363PH (Q200) was the first airplane to incorporate the "deep bing cherry red" on the underside of the engine nacelle. This became the standard for Horizon's brand livery as well as the current Alaska Airlines livery. Prior to this change, the underside of the nacelle was painted "Horizon White".

On January 25, 2011, Horizon Air announced it was retiring its public brand and adopting the trademark Eskimo of its sister company, Alaska Airlines, on its fleet. Horizon's Bombardier Q400 fleet was repainted with a new scheme prominently featuring "Alaska" across the fuselage and the Eskimo on the tail. The planes continue to include a small Horizon logo on the sides of the aircraft, which now appears in Alaska's dark blue color.

On March 5, 2019, Horizon introduced a themed livery in celebration of Horizon's heritage. Bombardier Q400 #N421QX featured stripes down the side in the traditional Horizon colors and the sunset logo on the tail. The aircraft made its inaugural flight from Yakima to Seattle, the route of Horizon's first ever flight.

== Photo gallery ==
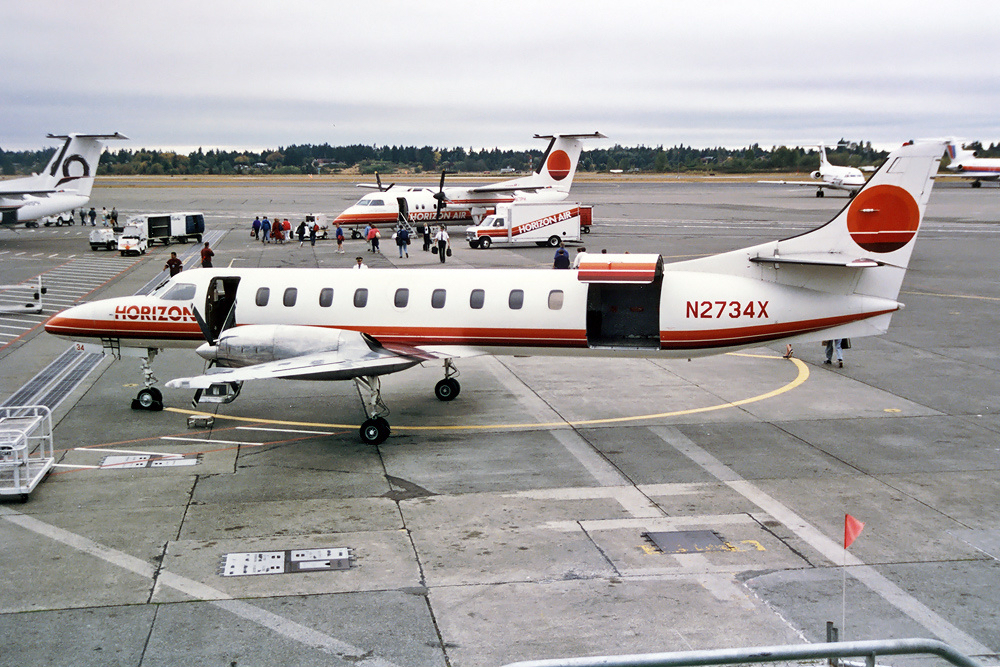
Fairchild Swearingen SA-227AC Metroliner III; DHC 8 in background

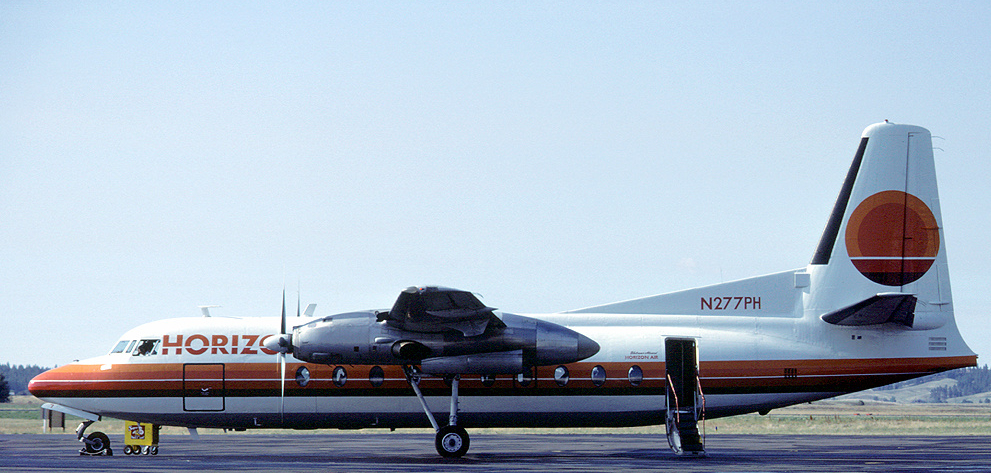
Fairchild FH.27 at Spokane International Airport in 1993

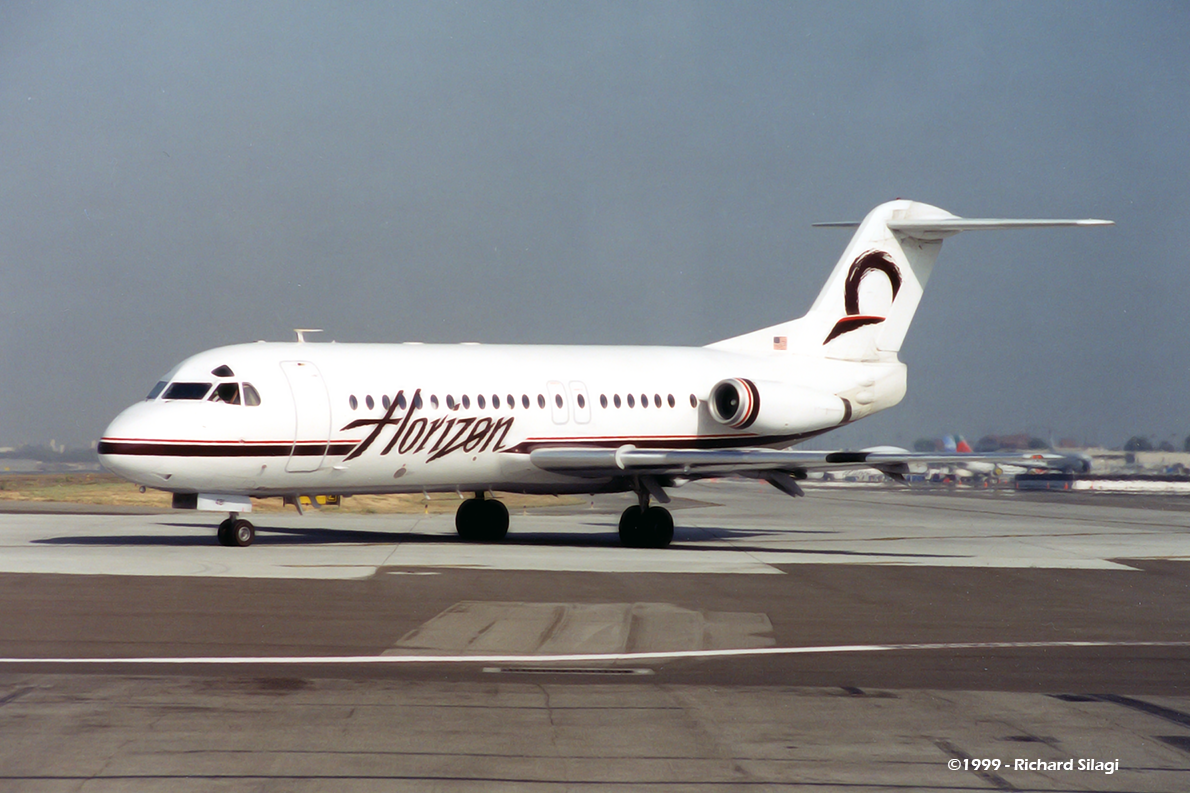
Fokker F.28-4000 in the second corporate livery

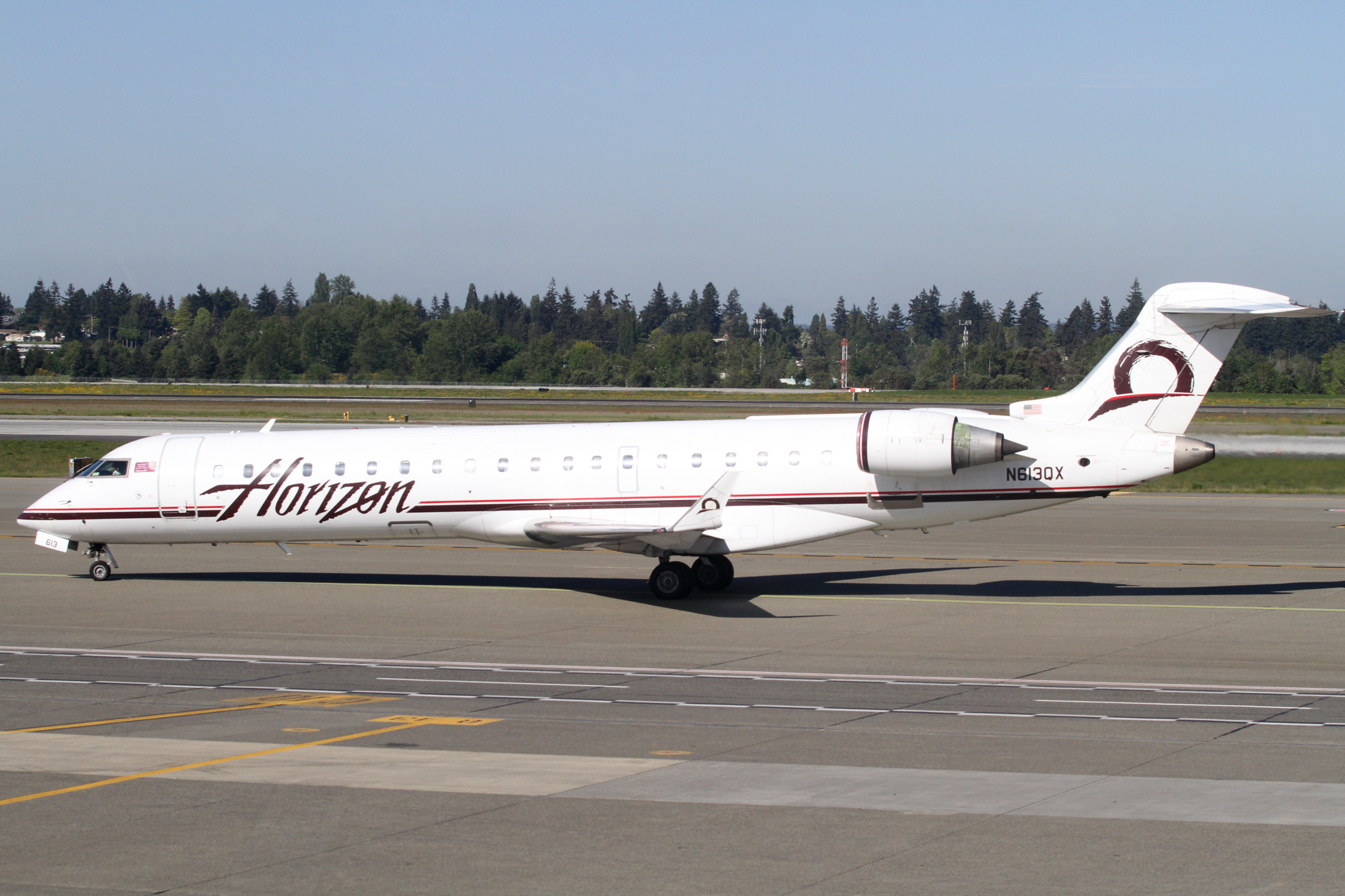
Bombardier CRJ-700

== Flight accidents and incidents ==
- On May 2, 1986, a Fairchild Metroliner was hijacked over Oregon, between Eugene and Portland. The pilot convinced the hijacker to allow the plane to stop in Hillsboro to refuel and even let the pilot off the plane, who then called the FBI.
- On April 15, 1988, Flight 2658, a Dash 8-100 (N819PH – Great City of Sun Valley), en route from Seattle to Spokane with 37 passengers and 3 crew members, crashed after attempting an emergency landing at Seattle–Tacoma International Airport (Sea-Tac). The number two (right side/starboard) engine caught fire (due to a manufacturing defect) after take-off from Seattle. Loss of hydraulic pressure due to the fire caused the aircraft to veer off the runway, across the grass, across Taxiway B, and crashed into the B7 and B9 jetways, destroying the plane. There were four serious injuries but no fatalities.
- On May 23, 1990, a Fairchild Metroliner III on a flight from Portland to Seattle suffered a window blowout at 14,000 feet (4,300 m) above Olympia. The flight made an emergency descent and landing to its planned destination of Sea-Tac Airport. The passenger seated next to the window, who was partially sucked out of the plane for a brief period, was taken to a local hospital where he was treated for his injuries and released.
- On August 10, 2018, a Horizon Air Bombardier Q400 aircraft registered N449QX was stolen from Seattle–Tacoma International Airport by Richard Russell, a ground service agent for Horizon. The incident prompted F-15 fighter jets to scramble and intercept the aircraft. After being in contact with air traffic control for over an hour, the aircraft crashed on Ketron Island in Pierce County, Washington, killing Russell, the only person on the aircraft.
- On October 22, 2023, Flight 2059 was operating from Paine Field in Everett, Washington to San Francisco International Airport when an off-duty pilot sitting in the jumpseat inside the flight deck, Joe Emerson, reportedly tried to pull both engine fire extinguisher handles on the overhead panel. The Embraer 175 aircraft was operating at 31,000 feet at the time, and if Emerson was successful at activating the fire extinguishers, both engines would have shut down. The crew was able to subdue him and land at the Portland International Airport in Oregon, where Emerson was arrested and later charged with 83 counts of attempted murder.

== Lawsuits ==
In November 2023, a class-action lawsuit was filed against Horizon and Alaska Airlines on behalf of the passengers on board Flight 2059, alleging that the passengers' lives were put at risk by an off-duty pilot who was allowed to ride in the cockpit and who attempted to shut off the engines during flight on October 22, 2023, and seeking an injunction that would require the airlines to "conduct reasonable examinations" of all employees with access to the cockpit immediately prior to boarding.

In July 2024, Horizon was sued by a flight attendant for the airline, who alleged that she was "repeatedly and severely" sexually harassed by two Horizon pilots from September 2023 through February of 2024 and that Horizon's human resources department "took no action" to protect her.

== See also ==
- Air transportation in the United States

== Bibliography ==
- Endicott, Bill (2001). Williams, Dayna Spear (ed.). Remember the Magic…: The Story of Horizon Air. Turner Publishing Company. ISBN 978-1-56311-725-1.
