= Air Oregon =

IATA	ICAO	Call sign
JT	—	AIR OREGON
- Founded: 1961; 65 years ago(as Executive Flight Services)
- Commenced operations: 1977; 49 years ago (as Air Oregon)
- Ceased operations: June 17, 1982; 44 years ago (merged into Horizon Air)
- Operating bases: Portland International Airport
- Headquarters: Portland, Oregon, United States

Air Oregon was an airline based in the U.S. state of Oregon. Founded as Executive Flight Services in 1961 in Portland; it was renamed to Air Oregon in 1977. In June 1982, Air Oregon was acquired by and merged into Horizon Air which is now a wholly owned subsidiary of the Alaska Air Group which in turn is also the corporate parent of Alaska Airlines. Air Oregon operated scheduled passenger service in the Pacific Northwest and northern California, and also served Boise, Idaho and Reno, Nevada.

== Destinations in 1981 ==
According to its June 1, 1981, system timetable, Air Oregon was serving the following destinations shortly before it was acquired and merged into Horizon Air:

- Boise, ID (BOI)
- Eugene, OR (EUG)
- Eureka, CA (ACV)
- Klamath Falls, OR (LMT)
- Medford, OR (MFR)
- Newport, OR (ONP)
- North Bend, OR (OTH)
- Pendleton, OR (PDT)
- Portland, OR (PDX) – Hub and airline headquarters
- Redding, CA (RDD)
- Redmond, OR (RDM)
- Reno, NV (RNO)
- Sacramento, CA (SMF)
- Salem, OR (SLE)
- San Francisco, CA (SFO)
- Seattle, WA (SEA)

According to the above referenced system timetable, Air Oregon was operating all flights at this time with 50-passenger Fokker F27 Friendship and 19-passenger Fairchild Swearingen Metroliner (Metro II and Metro III models) turboprop aircraft. This timetable also states that Portland (PDX), San Francisco (SFO), Eugene (EUG), Medford (MFD) and Eureka (ACV) were all served with the larger F27 propjet as well as with the smaller Metroliner aircraft.

In 1979, Air Oregon was also serving Baker, OR (BKE), Corvallis, OR (CVO), Hermiston, OR (HES), La Grande, OR (LGD), Ontario, OR (OND), Roseburg, OR (RBG) and Seattle Boeing Field (BFI) from its Portland hub with those destinations located in northeastern Oregon also receiving service from Boise.

== Fleet ==
Air Oregon operated the following aircraft types during its existence:

- Beechcraft Bonanza (A36 model)
- de Havilland Canada DHC-7 Dash 7
- Fairchild Swearingen Metroliner (Metro II and Metro III models)
- Fokker F27 Friendship
- Piper PA-31 Navajo Chieftain
- Piper PA-34 Seneca

== See also ==
- List of defunct airlines of the United States
