= Florence Municipal Airport =

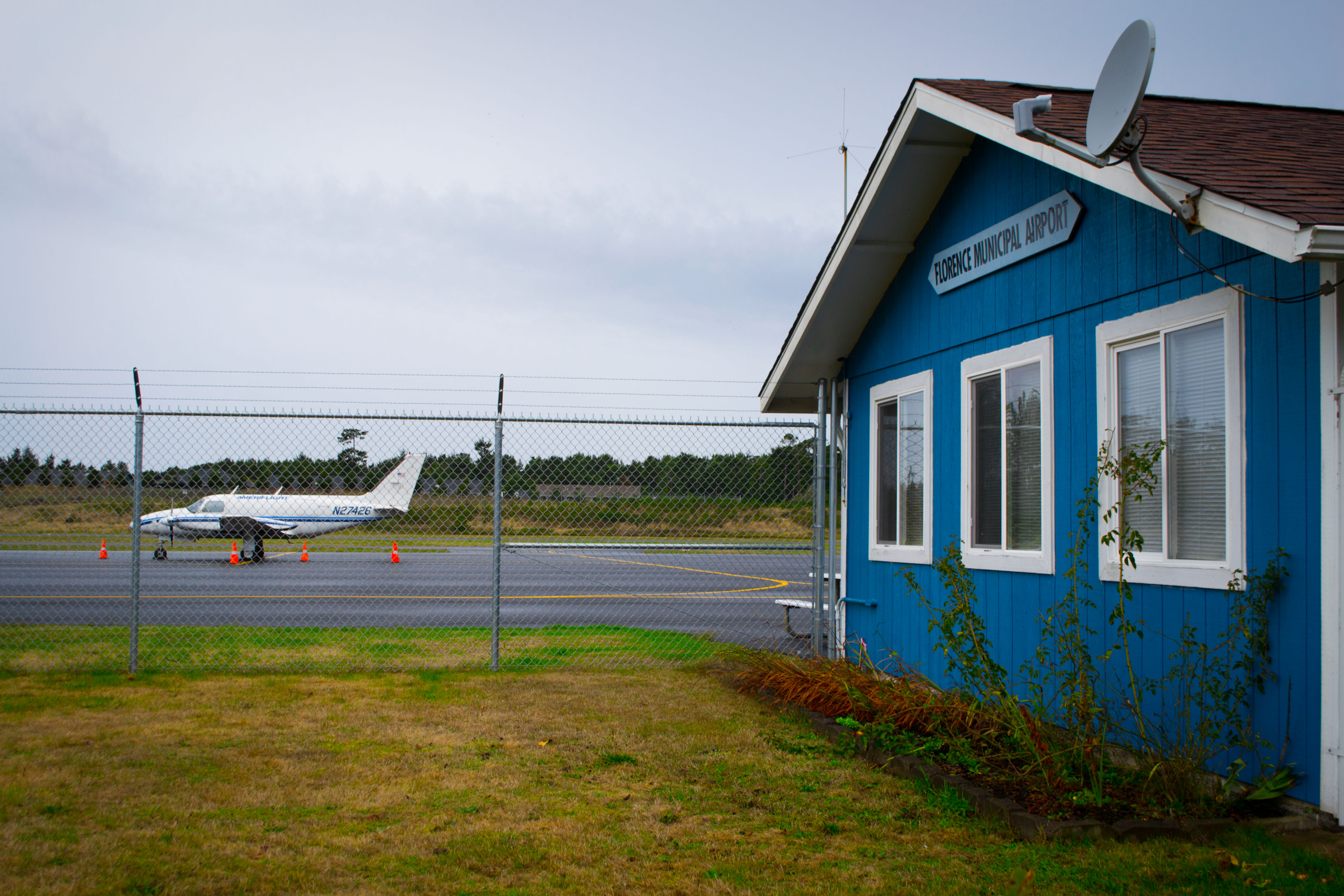
- IATA: FMU; ICAO: none; FAA LID: 6S2

Summary
- Airport type: Public
- Owner: City of Florence
- Operator: City of Florence
- Serves: Florence, Oregon
- Location: Florence, Oregon
- Elevation AMSL: 51 ft / 15.5 m
- Coordinates: 43°58′58.1400″N 124°06′40.93″W
- Website: http://www.ci.florence.or.us/airport
- Interactive map of Florence Municipal Airport

Runways
Direction	Length		Surface
Direction	ft	m	Surface
15/33	3,000	914.4	Asphalt

Florence Municipal Airport (IATA: FMU, FAA LID: 6S2), is a public airport located in the city of Florence in Lane County, Oregon, United States. It is mostly used for general aviation.

== Facilities and aircraft ==
Florence Municipal Airport contains one asphalt paved runway, 15/33, which measures 3000 x 60 ft (914.4 x 18.3 m). There is no air traffic control tower located on the airfield.

There are 13 aircraft based on the field. 11 single-engines and 2 multi-engine aircraft.

The airport has an average of 134 flights a week. This includes 70% general aviation, 21% military and 9% air taxi.

== Cargo carriers ==
Airlines	Destinations
Ameriflight	Newport, Portland, Salem
