= Grants Pass Airport =

- IATA: GTP; ICAO: FAA: 3S8

Summary
- Airport type: Public
- Operator: Josephine County Airports
- Location: Grants Pass, Oregon
- Elevation AMSL: 1,130 ft / 343.2 m
- Coordinates: 42°30′36.4220″N 123°23′16.76″W
- Interactive map of Grants Pass Airport

Runways
Direction	Length		Surface
Direction	ft	m	Surface
13/31	4,001	1,219	Asphalt

Grants Pass Airport (IATA: GTP, FAA LID: 3S8) is a public airport located five miles (8 km) northwest of the city of Grants Pass in Josephine County, Oregon, United States.

== Cargo carriers ==
Airlines	Destinations
Ameriflight	Portland

== Airport communications ==
CTAF/UNICOM	122.8
WX AWOS-3PT	120.0 (541-955-3392)
Cascade approach	124.3 [0600-2330]
Cascade departure	124.3 [0600-2330]
