= Roberts Field =

Airport in Redmond serving Central Oregon, United States

Redmond Municipal Airport Roberts Field

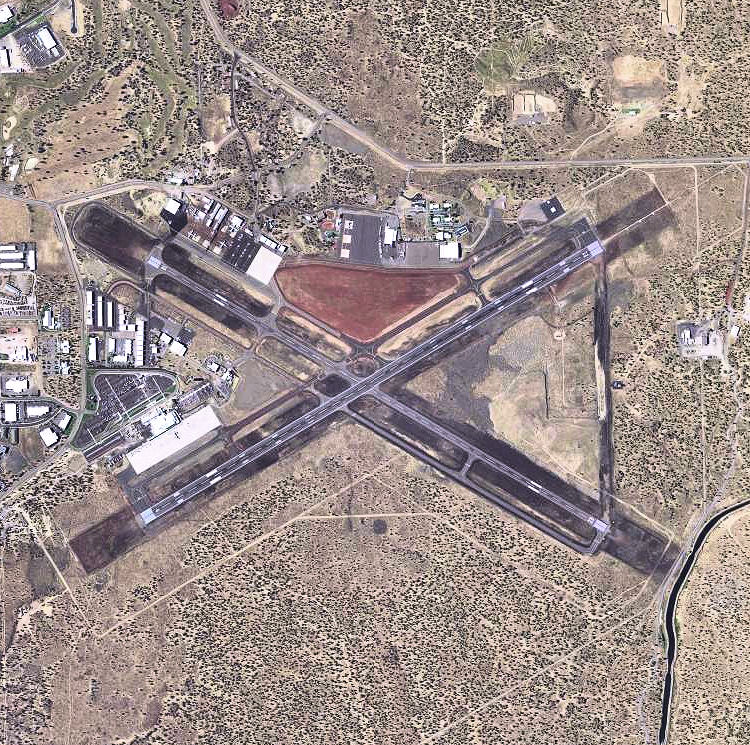
- USGS 2006 orthophoto
- IATA: RDM; ICAO: KRDM; FAA LID: RDM

Summary
- Airport type: Public
- Owner: City of Redmond
- Serves: Central Oregon
- Elevation AMSL: 3,080 ft (940 m)
- Coordinates: 44°15′15″N 121°08′59″W
- Website: www.FlyRDM.com

Map
- Interactive map of Redmond Municipal Airport

Runways
Direction	Length		Surface
Direction	ft	m	Surface
5/23	7,038	2,145	Asphalt
11/29	7,006	2,135	Asphalt

Helipads
Number	Length		Surface
Number	ft	m	Surface
H1	48	15	Concrete

Statistics (2025)
- Total enplanements: 654,536
- Total deplanements: 663,119
- Total passengers: 1,317,665
- Sources: FAA, airport website

Redmond Municipal Airport (IATA: RDM, ICAO: KRDM, FAA LID: RDM) (Roberts Field) is in Redmond, Oregon, United States. It is owned and operated by the city of Redmond.

It is the main commercial airport in Central Oregon, with nonstop scheduled passenger airline flights to several hubs in the western U.S. as well as seasonally to Dallas. The airfield serves Redmond and nearby Bend, Oregon. It is the home of the Lancair factory and a base for aerial firefighting aircraft operated by private airtanker companies. The United States Forest Service (USFS) Redmond Air Center is on the airport and supports regional firefighting operations with this federal facility providing training and housing for smokejumper teams along with fuel, water and fire retardant for airtanker aircraft at its ramps along the north side of the field.

The National Plan of Integrated Airport Systems for 2011–2015 called it a primary commercial service airport. Federal Aviation Administration records say the airport had 364,921 passenger boardings (enplanements) in calendar year 2017, up from 306,517 in 2016.

== History ==
Built in the 1920s, passenger flights arrived at the airport in 1940. During World War II the airfield was used by the United States Army Air Forces as a bomber base. After the war the federal government sold the airport to the city for $1.

== Past airline service ==
In 1947 United Airlines began flying Douglas DC-3s Portland–Redmond–Klamath Falls–Sacramento–San Francisco–Monterey–Santa Barbara–Los Angeles. In 1959 United Convair 340s flew Seattle–Portland–Redmond–Klamath Falls–Sacramento–San Francisco.

In 1959 West Coast Airlines replaced United; its DC-3s flew Portland, Oregon–Salem, Oregon–Redmond, Oregon–Klamath Falls, Oregon–Lakeview, Oregon–Burns, Oregon–Boise, Idaho route. West Coast Airlines later merged with Bonanza Air Lines and Pacific Air Lines to form Air West, which was later renamed Hughes Airwest. In 1972 Hughes Airwest Fairchild F-27s flew nonstop to Portland and direct to Sacramento, San Francisco and Seattle. By 1975, Hughes Airwest had begun Douglas DC-9-10s and McDonnell Douglas DC-9-30s to Roberts Field. Hughes Airwest DC-9s flew nonstop to Portland and direct to San Francisco (SFO) and Los Angeles (LAX). In 1980 Hughes Airwest had four DC-9 flights per day from Redmond, two to San Francisco via Redding and two to Seattle via Eugene. In 1986 Hughes Airwest merged into Republic Airlines, which continued DC-9 service at Redmond.

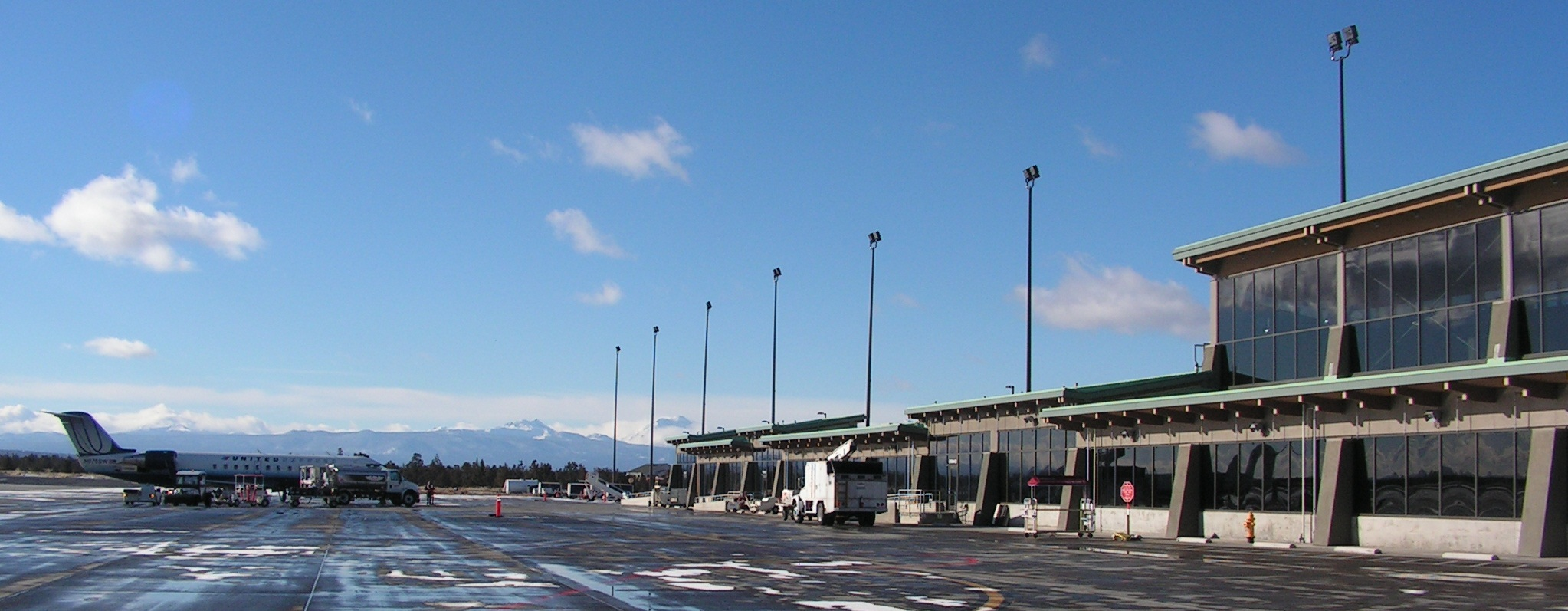
Terminal and ramp, with central Cascade Range in the distance, Dec. 2010

Other jets to Redmond included Alaska Airlines Boeing 727-200s for a few months in winter 1989–90 with nonstops to Los Angeles (LAX) and Seattle, Pacific Express BAC One-Elevens to Portland, San Francisco and other cities, Pacific Southwest Airlines (PSA) BAe 146-200s to San Francisco, and Reno Air McDonnell Douglas MD-80s to San Jose, California.

On August 1, 2006, Horizon Air began twice daily nonstops to Los Angeles with Bombardier Dash 8 Q400s; Horizon reduced service to one flight daily on June 24, 2008 and by 2010 this flight had ended. In the late 2000s, Allegiant Air flew McDonnell Douglas MD-80s twice a week to both Las Vegas and Phoenix's suburban airport Phoenix–Mesa Gateway Airport (AZA). In early 2012 Allegiant Air announced it would fly to Oakland, California, beginning in April. On May 23, 2012, Allegiant announced it would end service to the airport on August 12. The airline later resumed serving Redmond with Airbus mainline jetliners.

In 2005 Delta Connection flights operated by SkyWest Airlines for Delta Air Lines began nonstop to Salt Lake City with Canadair CRJ-100s, now replaced by the larger CRJ-700. All United Express flights operated by SkyWest Airlines on behalf of United Airlines are being flown with Canadair regional jets to Redmond following the retirement of Embraer EMB-120 Brasilias by SkyWest. Alaska Airlines flights are now largely operated by the Embraer E175, having replaced regular Q400 service.

Horizon announced cuts to Seattle and Portland service in 2009, as it continued to phase-out its smaller aircraft in favor of the Q400. The airline's seat capacity from Redmond is expected to remain nearly the same. United Express announced it would operate its regional jet service to Denver year-round, thus giving RDM passenger service to a second hub in addition to the Delta Connection service to Salt Lake City.

United Express announced it would upgrade its CRJ 200 flights to Denver from weekends only to daily and would expand service to San Francisco as the EMB-120 Brasilia was replaced with CRJ 200s. This increased the daily seats despite the reduction from three flights per day to two. Flight time was reduced by nearly an hour.

Boardings increased in the first half of 2010. United resumed three Redmond-San Francisco flights a day in November 2010 after several years with only two flights. In 2011, passenger boardings were 3% higher than 2010 (through October), thus being the busiest year since the airport opened.

In early 2013 American Eagle announced it would offer nonstop service to Los Angeles for American Airlines with these flights replacing the service by Alaska Airlines regional connector Horizon Air. A method known as a "travel bank" was used, where local individuals, businesses, and civic entities pre-purchased travel vouchers from the airline, acting as a commitment to the required level of demand on the route, which began in June, and was served by SkyWest Airlines Canadair CRJ-200s branded as American Eagle.

By mid-2014, United announced the end of all flights between Portland and both Redmond and Eugene, due to SkyWest's elimination of the EMB-120 from its fleet; the routes are ostensibly unable to support CRJ service. A year later, a transition of the once-daily Los Angeles flight to irregular seasonal operations was acknowledged by American Airlines with American Eagle service to LAX resuming in 2015.

In summer 2016, daily service was added as American Eagle started service between Redmond and Phoenix Sky Harbor International Airport, also using regional contractor SkyWest's CRJ-700; the flights began sooner than expected due to travel-bank fundraising among the Central Oregon community.

In 2017 Delta Air Lines added Delta Connection service to Seattle; in 2018 United Airlines added United Express service to Los Angeles.

In summer 2019 United added seasonal flights to its hub at O'Hare International Airport in Chicago. This is the airport's only nonstop service to a destination east of the Mississippi River.

Avelo Airlines began new nonstop service between Redmond and the Hollywood Burbank Airport (BUR) in the Los Angeles area on May 13, 2021, with Boeing 737-800 mainline jetliners. Avelo announced it would end service in December 2025, but later moved that date to October 2025.

== Facility growth/passenger terminal ==
A passenger terminal was built in 1950 and replaced in 1981 by a 6,000-square-foot (560 m^{2}) terminal. In 1992-93 the terminal was expanded to 23,000 square feet (2,100 m^{2}).

By late 2009, Roberts Field completed another large terminal expansion, designed by HNTB.

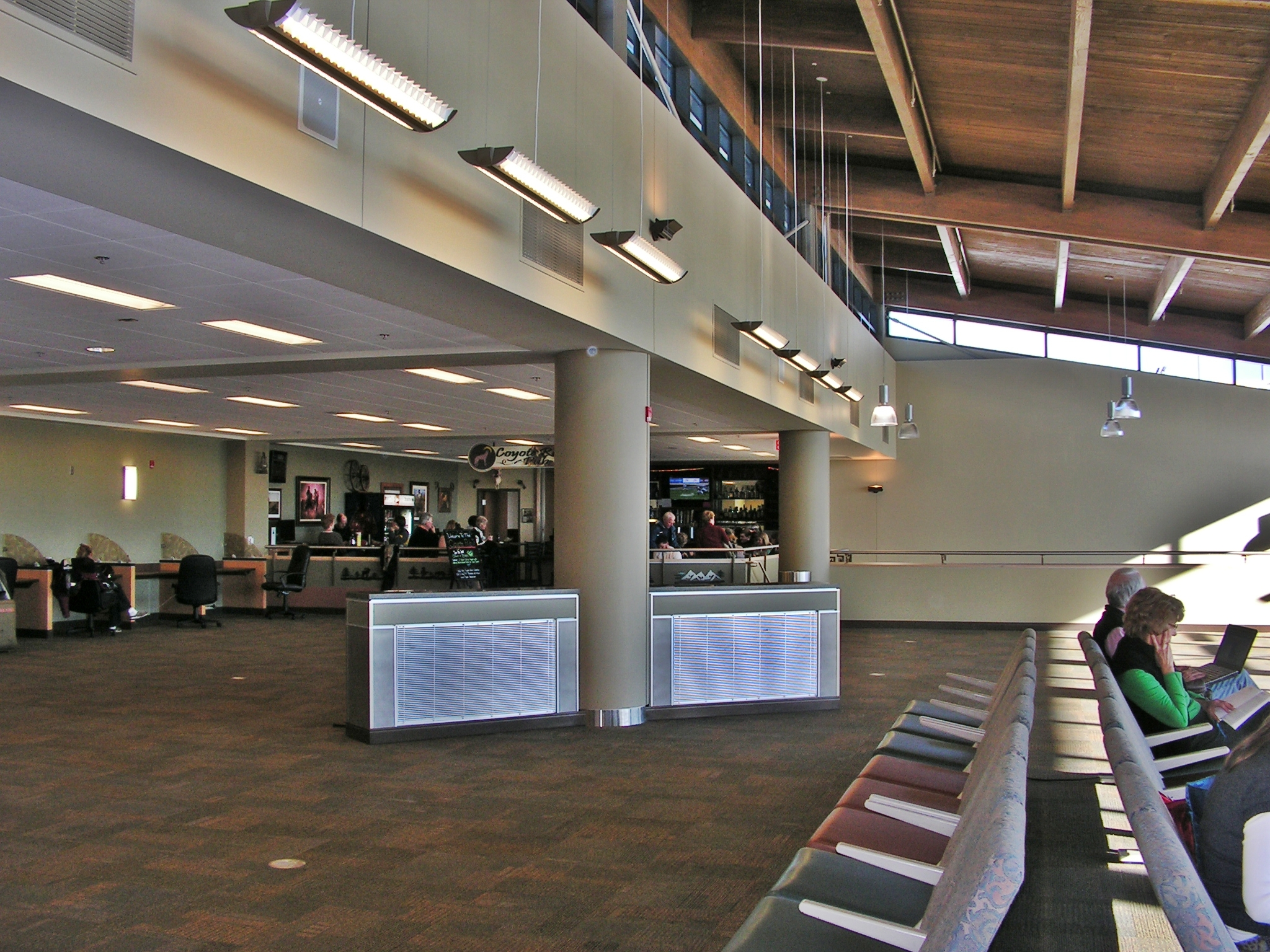
Redmond, Oregon passenger terminal, upper deck restaurant area

Along with increased parking, the facility has increased its area by about 600%, allowing more room for security and traveler services, as well as concessions and gate operations. While the new bi-level structure is capable of supporting jet bridges, the low frequency of full-size jets operating from the terminal, and no indication of tenant airline desire, means that these bridges are not currently included, though walking distance to and from planes has been reduced.

In October 2009, most sections of the expanded passenger terminal opened for public use; the improvements include more numerous check-in counters and restrooms, along with a two-story, windowed departure lounge. Travelers may now use covered walkways between aircraft and terminal.

A year after the expansion's completion, a bar and restaurant opened in the secure area. Efforts to add additional concessions are currently underway. A restaurant was located in the main terminal until 2009, but this is the first time that food and drink are available in the departure gate area.

Since the airport began displaying public art in the terminal, it has sold nearly $100,000 worth of artworks to travelers.

In June 2025, construction began on an 80,000 square feet (7,400 m^{2}) terminal expansion that will add seven new jet bridges, a new concourse and larger waiting areas. Construction is scheduled to be complete in 2028 and estimates project a cost of $180 million.

== Infrastructure ==
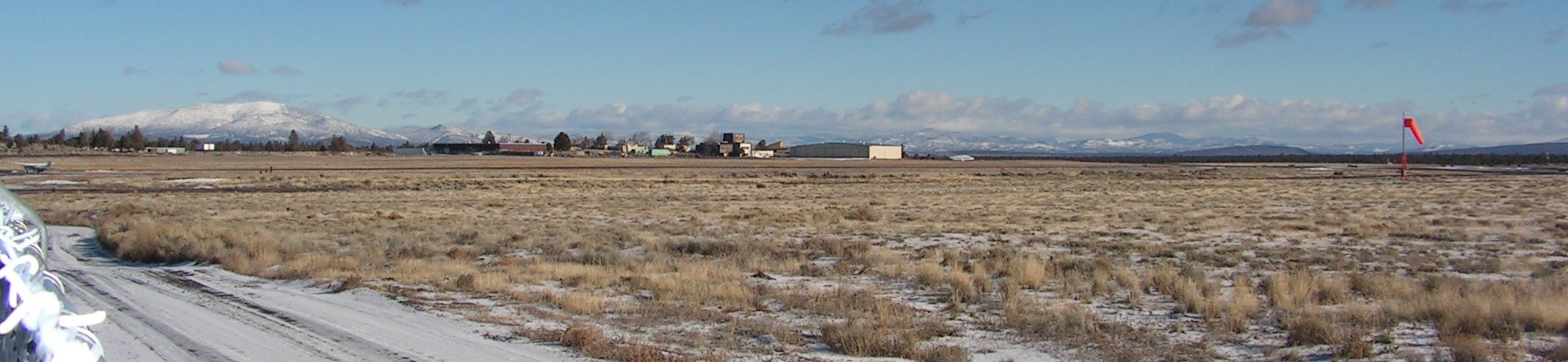
USFS and aerial firefighting ramps at Roberts Field

The airport upgraded its mass-casualty vehicle in 2011 due to larger commercial jets using Roberts Field; while the old unit could handle 37 patients, the new truck is prepared for an incident involving over 100. In early 2012, the airport began hosting a MEDEVAC helicopter operated by Lifeflight. In May 2016 the airport runways closed for nearly three weeks, allowing their intersection to be reconstructed as part of a project to re-pave both.

== Facilities ==
Roberts Field covers 2,518 acres (1,019 ha) at an elevation of 3,080 feet (940 m). It has two asphalt runways: 5/23 is 7,038 by 150 feet (2,145 by 46 m) and 11/29 is 7,006 by 100 feet (2,135 by 30 m). It has one concrete helipad H1, 48 by 48 feet (15 by 15 m).

== Airlines and destinations ==
FAA diagram

=== Passenger ===
Airlines	Destinations
Alaska Airlines	Burbank, Los Angeles, Portland, San Diego, San Francisco, Seattle/Tacoma
American Eagle	Phoenix–Sky Harbor
Breeze Airways	Las Vegas
Delta Connection	Salt Lake City, Seattle/Tacoma
United Airlines	Denver, San Francisco
United Express	Los Angeles, San Francisco

=== Destinations map ===
Destinations map
Destinations from Redmond Airport
Red = Year-round destination
Green = Seasonal destination
Blue = Future destination

=== Cargo ===
Airlines	Destinations
Ameriflight	Eugene, Portland/Hillsboro, Portland
FedEx Feeder	Portland

== Statistics ==
=== Top destinations ===
Top domestic routes out of RDM (August 2025 – July 2026)
Rank	City	Passengers	Carriers
1	(Washington (state)) Seattle/Tacoma, Washington	177,500	Alaska, Delta
2	Denver, Colorado	101,630	United
3	San Francisco, California	97,990	Alaska, United
4	Portland, Oregon	62,920	Alaska
5	Phoenix–Sky Harbor, Arizona	50,330	American
6	Los Angeles, California	45,210	Alaska, United
7	Salt Lake City, Utah	41,760	Delta
8	San Diego, California	32,780	Alaska
9	Burbank, California	19,990	Alaska
10	Las Vegas, Nevada	5,320	Breeze

=== Airline market share ===
Largest airlines at RDM (August 2025 – July 2026)
Rank	Airline	Passengers	Share
1	SkyWest Airlines	426,000	33.35%
2	United Airlines	325,000	25.42%
3	Horizon Air	302,000	23.62%
4	Alaska Airlines	100,000	7.84%
5	Envoy Air	94,230	7.38%
—	Other Airlines	30,420	2.38%
