= KCVO =

KCVO may refer to:

- Knight Commander of the Royal Victorian Order, a British honour
- the ICAO identifier of Corvallis Municipal Airport in Corvallis, Oregon, United States
- KCVO-FM, a radio station (91.7 FM) licensed to Camdenton, Missouri, United States
- KCVO is a football team from Vaassen, The Netherlands
