= Southwest Oregon Regional Airport =

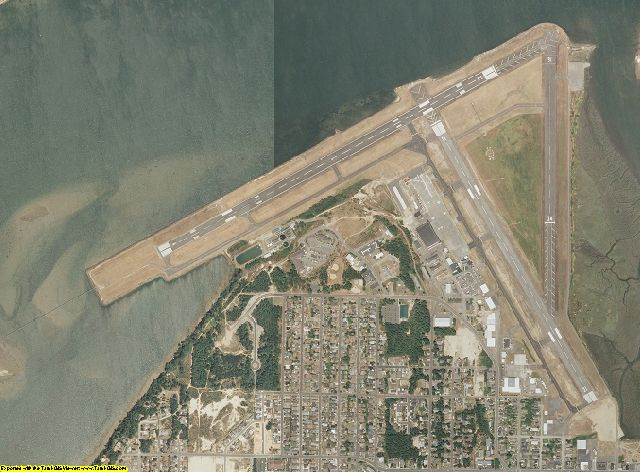
- IATA: OTH; ICAO: KOTH; FAA LID: OTH

Summary
- Airport type: Public
- Owner/Operator: Coos County Airport District
- Location: North Bend, Oregon
- Elevation AMSL: 17 ft (5.2 m)
- Coordinates: 43°25′02″N 124°15′46″W
- Website: cooscountyairportdistrict.com

Maps
- FAA airport diagram as of January 2021
- Location within Oregon Location within the United States

Runways
Direction	Length		Surface
Direction	ft	m	Surface
5/23	5,321	1,622	Asphalt
13/31	4,471	1,363	Asphalt

Statistics
- Aircraft operations (2015): 18,277
- Based aircraft (2018): 56
- Passengers (12 months ending Mar. 2018): 25,000
- Source: Federal Aviation Administration, BTS

Southwest Oregon Regional Airport (IATA: OTH, ICAO: KOTH, FAA LID: OTH), formerly North Bend Municipal Airport, is a public airport in North Bend, Coos County, Oregon, United States. It is operated by the Coos County Airport District. OTH covers 619 acres (251 ha) of land.

The airport changed its name in April 2006 to avoid confusion with Bend, in central Oregon.

It is the only airport on the Oregon Coast with passenger service. North Bend/Coos Bay is served by United Express (SkyWest) which flies nonstop to San Francisco International Airport (since about July 2008); before the SFO flights, United Express flew OTH to Portland International Airport non-stop. This ended on February 16, 2012. United Express also has a seasonal nonstop flight to Denver.

In January 2012 now defunct SeaPort Airlines began daily flights to Portland; by early 2016 SeaPort announced that they were ending their service to North Bend/Coos Bay. On the heels of the announcement by SeaPort, PenAir announced they would begin non-stop Saab 340 service between Portland and North Bend beginning March 21, 2016. SeaPort ceased operations at North Bend on March 20, 2016. The federally subsidized air service provided by PenAir proved to be short-lived and on August 4, 2017, PenAir announced the North Bend/Coos Bay service was terminated effective as of August 7, 2017.

OTH had airline service on Horizon Air, direct to Portland International Airport beginning in 1982. Horizon Air ended the OTH-PDX flight on October 11, 2008.

The airport is seeing more private and corporate jets bringing golfers to Bandon Dunes Golf Resort; the resort is a 20-minute drive from the OTH airport. The Coos County Airport District designed and opened a new terminal facility in July 2008; in February 2009 a new air traffic control tower opened.

== History ==
First plane, Brubaker Aerial Survey Plane, lands on the grassy field at the airport October 12, 1929. It is the first plane that is known to have landed at the site. [Coos History Museum]

The North Bend/Coos Bay Airport opened in 1932.

The U.S. Naval Auxiliary Air Station, North Bend was started in 1936 and commissioned on May 10, 1943.

The airport was transferred to the City of North Bend in 1947 as military surplus property.

The first airline flights were West Coast DC-3s in 1947; successor Hughes Airwest pulled out in 1979.

The City of North Bend transferred management of the airport to the Oregon International Port of Coos Bay in July 1999.

The Coos County Airport District was formed by a general election on December 4, 2002, with ownership and management of the airport transferred to the district in December 2003.

A HondaJet ran off the runway into Coos Bay on April 7, 2025 with 5 on board. All passengers survived.

== Airline and destinations ==
=== Passenger ===
Airlines	Destinations
United Express	San Francisco; Seasonal: Denver

Destinations map
Domestic destinations from Southwest Oregon Regional Airport
Red = Year-round destination
Green = Seasonal destination

=== Cargo ===
Airlines	Destinations
Ameriflight	Corvallis, Crescent City, Portland/Hillsboro, Portland (OR)
FedEx Feeder	Portland (OR), Roseburg, Salem

== Statistics ==
=== Top destinations ===
Top domestic routes out of OTH (January 2024 - December 2024)
Rank	City	Passengers	Carriers
1	San Francisco, CA	17,340	United Express
2	Denver, CO	2,990	United Express

=== Airline market share ===
Largest airlines at OTH (January 2024 - December 2024)
Rank	Airline	Passengers	Share
1	SkyWest Airlines	40,990	100.00%

== Gallery ==
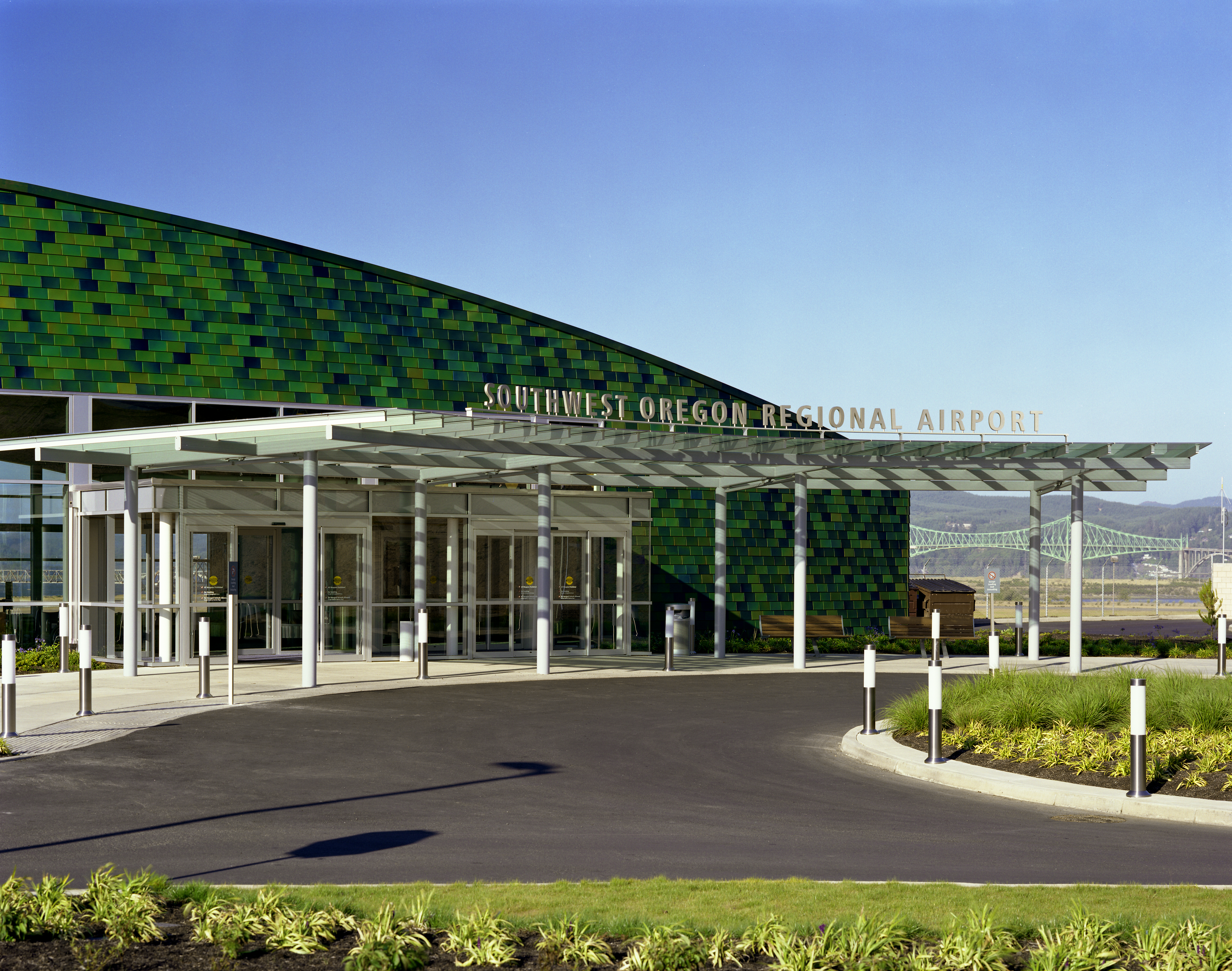
Terminal entrance

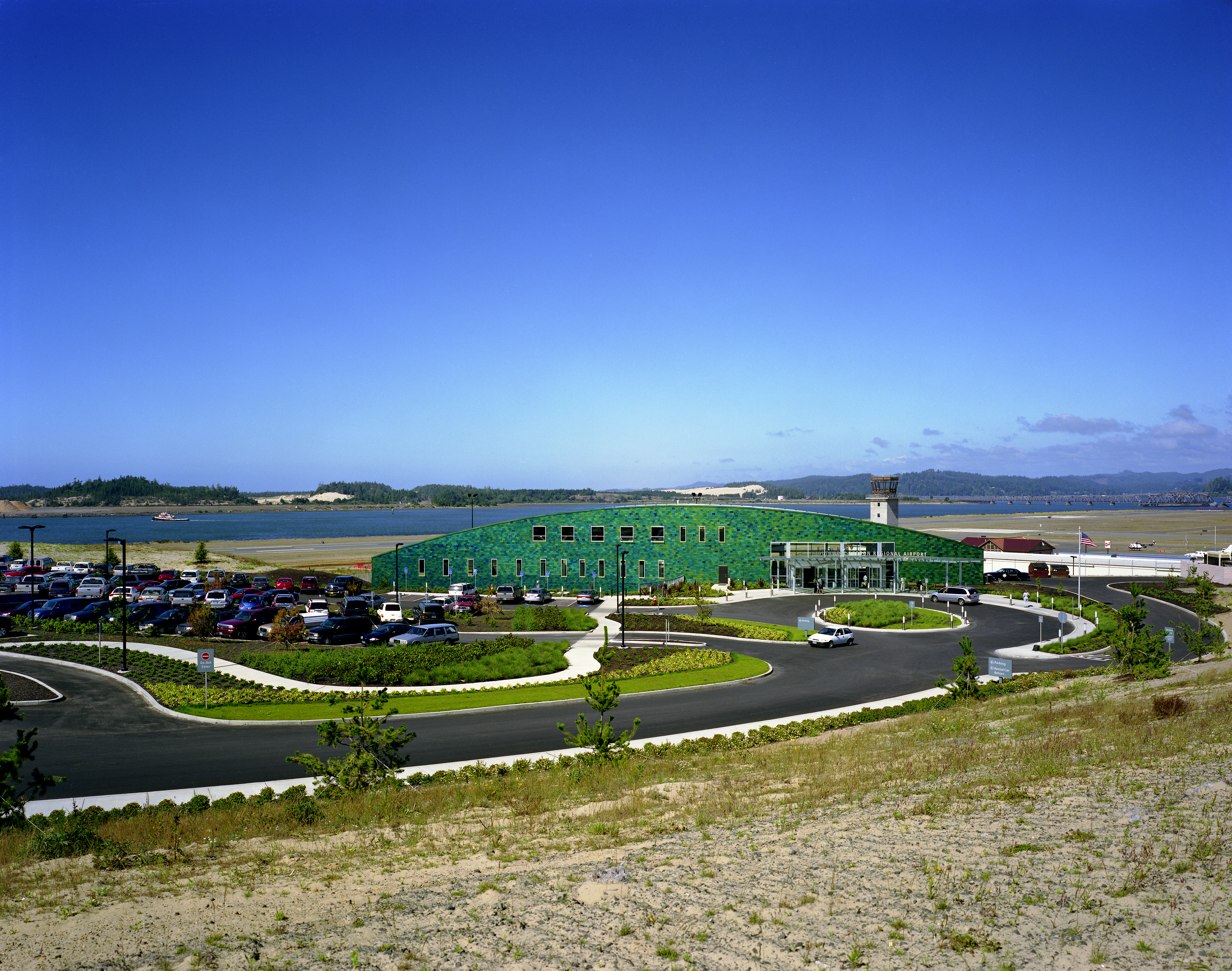
Terminal & tower

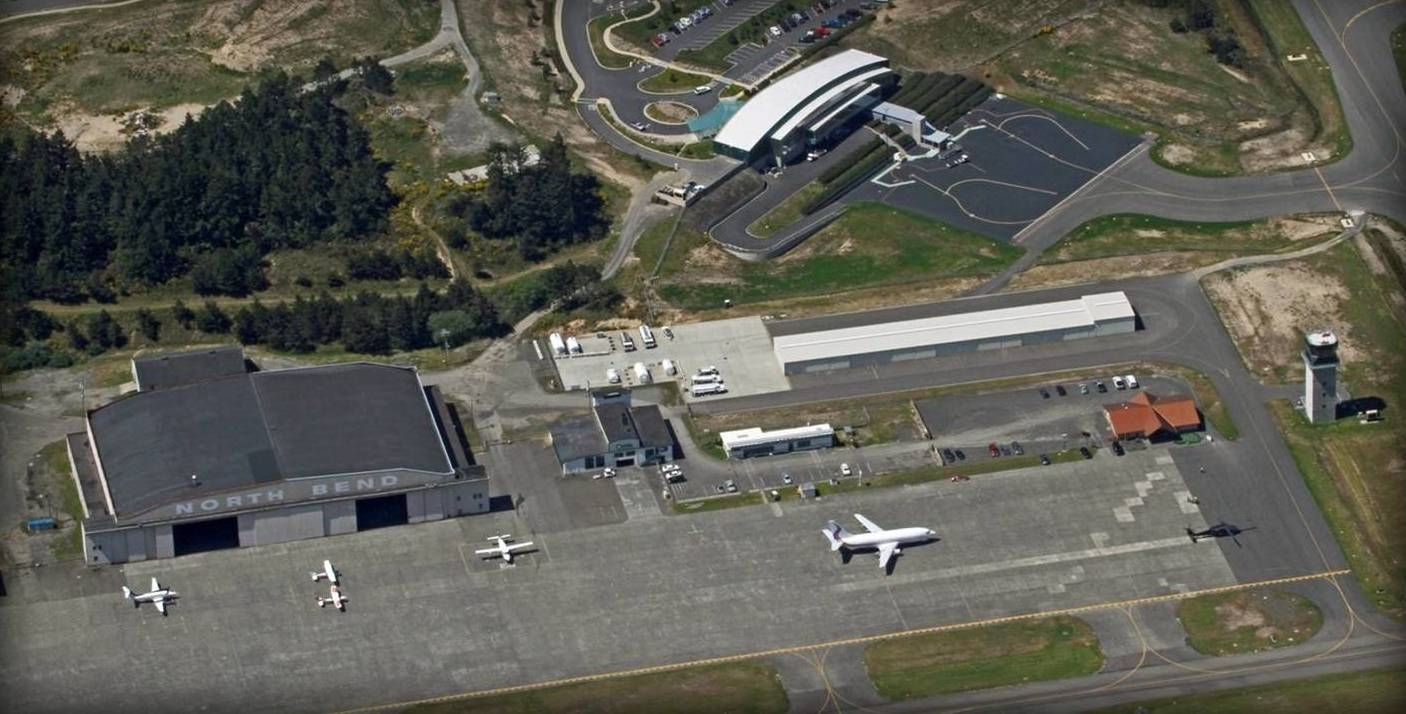
Hangar/ramp area

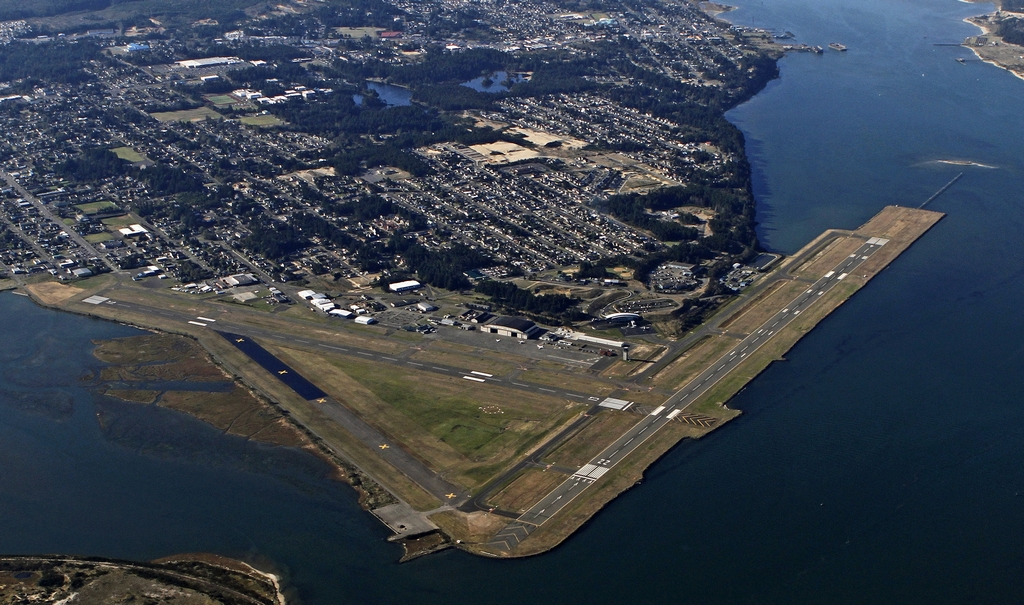
Aerial

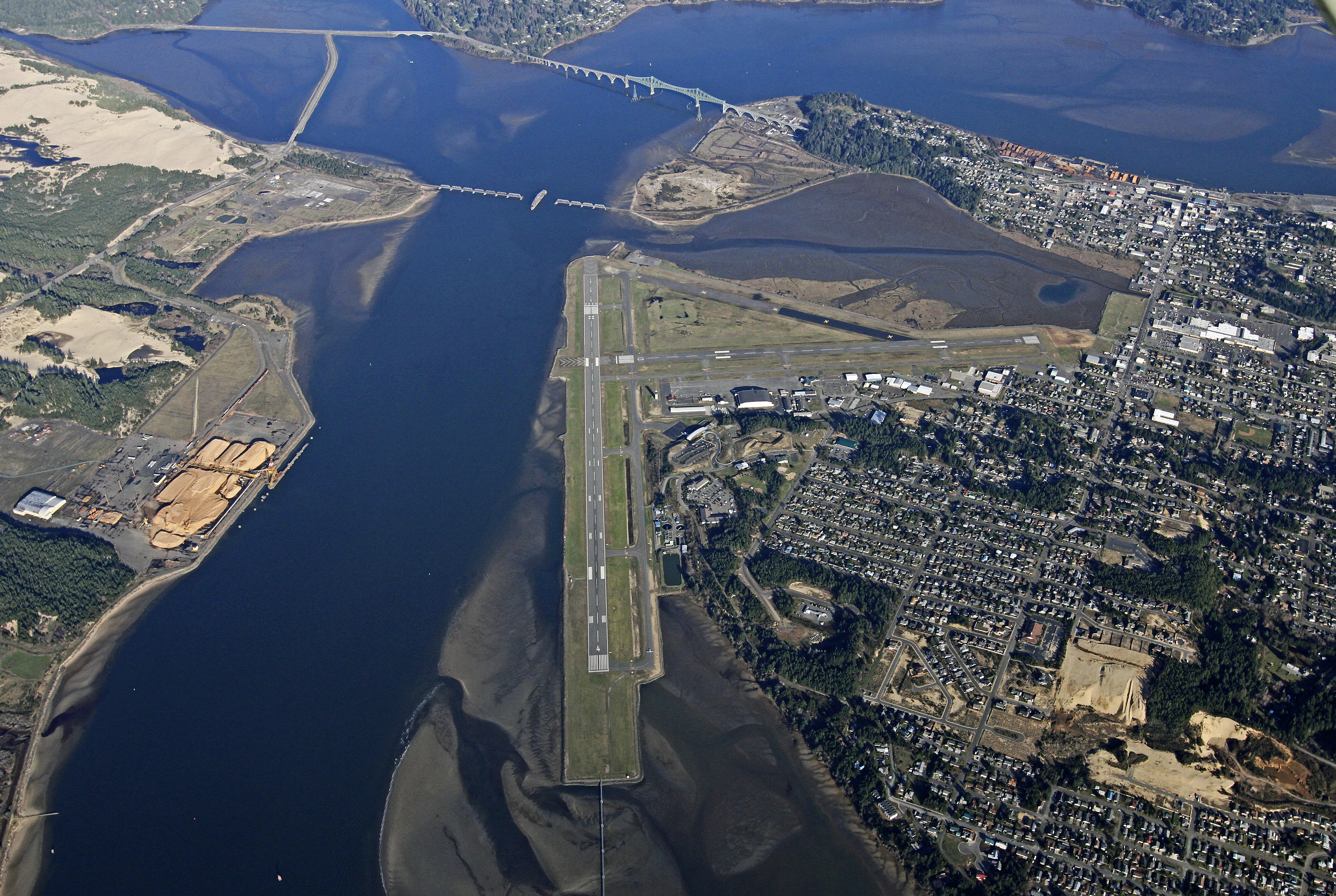
Aerial of Coos Bay/North Bend

== See also ==
- Coast Guard Air Station North Bend
