= Brookings Airport =

Airport in Oregon, United States

- IATA: BOK; ICAO: KBOK; FAA LID: BOK

Summary
- Airport type: Public
- Owner: City of Brookings, Oregon
- Serves: Brookings, Oregon
- Elevation AMSL: 459 ft (140 m)
- Coordinates: 42°04′28″N 124°17′24″W

Map
- Location of Brookings Airport

Runways
Direction	Length		Surface
Direction	ft	m	Surface
12/30	2,901	884	Asphalt

Statistics (2020)
- Aircraft operations (year ending 7/27/2020): 22,600
- Based aircraft: 21
- Source: Federal Aviation Administration

Brookings Airport (IATA: BOK, ICAO: KBOK, FAA LID: BOK) is a public-use airport located one nautical mile (2 km) northeast of the central business district of Brookings, a city in Curry County, Oregon, United States. It is included in the National Plan of Integrated Airport Systems for 2011–2015, which categorized it as a general aviation facility. The airport is owned by the City of Brookings. It was formerly owned by the State of Oregon, followed by Curry County, before it was acquired by the city.

== Facilities and aircraft ==
Brookings Airport covers an area of 90 acres (36 ha) at an elevation of 462 feet (141 m) above mean sea level. It has one runway designated 12/30 with an asphalt surface measuring 2,901 by 60 feet (884 x 18 m).

For the 12-month period ending July 27, 2020, the airport had 22,600 aircraft operations, an average of 62 per day: 94% general aviation, 6% air taxi, and <1% military. At that time there were 21 aircraft based at this airport: 14 single-engine, 2 multi-engine, 1 jet, and 4 helicopter.

Brookings Airport has self-service fuel, hangars, a tie-down ramp, and a pilot lounge.

== Cargo Carriers ==
The Brookings Airport has Ameriflight cargo airline service to North Bend/Coos Bay, Corvallis, and Portland.
