= ONP =

ONP or Onp may refer to:

- Olympic National Park, a U.S. National Park in Washington State
- Ortho-nitrophenol, a chemical substance, created by the hydrolization of Ortho-nitrophenyl-β-galactoside
- Newport Municipal Airport (Oregon), a general aviation airport in Newport, Oregon
- One Nation (Australia), an Australian political party
- Organisation of the Polish Nation - Polish League, a Polish political party
- ONP (notation) (Polish), another name for Reverse Polish notation (RPN) sometimes used
- Old Newsprint or Old Newspaper, a fiber grade separated in a materials recovery facility
