= KBOK =

KBOK may refer to:

- Brookings Airport (ICAO code KBOK)
- KBOK-LP, a low-power radio station (93.3 FM) licensed to serve Reno, Nevada, United States
- KZYP (AM), a radio station (1310 AM) licensed to serve Malvern, Arkansas, United States, which held the call sign KBOK until 2014
