= Coast Guard Air Station North Bend =

US Coast Guard base in North Bend, Oregon

Coordinates: 43°24′33″N 124°14′24″W

CGAS North Bend
- Unit patch
- Active: 1974 to present
- Country: United States
- Branch: United States Coast Guard
- Type: Coast Guard Air Station
- Role: Search & rescue
- Size: 153 active duty
- Garrison/HQ: Southwest Oregon Regional Airport
- First Commander: Cmdr Edward F. Lewis

Aircraft flown
- Helicopter: MH-65E Dolphin

Coast Guard Air Station North Bend (CGAS North Bend) was established September 28, 1974 at Southwest Oregon Regional Airport in North Bend, Oregon, United States. The unit houses 153 active duty, nine reserve duty and five civilian personnel. The unit operates five Eurocopter HH-65 Dolphin helicopters. CGAS North Bend received its first upgraded HH-65C Dolphin in 2007 The unit functions include search and rescue, law enforcement, marine environmental protection, aids to navigation, and enforcement of federal treaties.
