= Newport Municipal Airport (Oregon) =

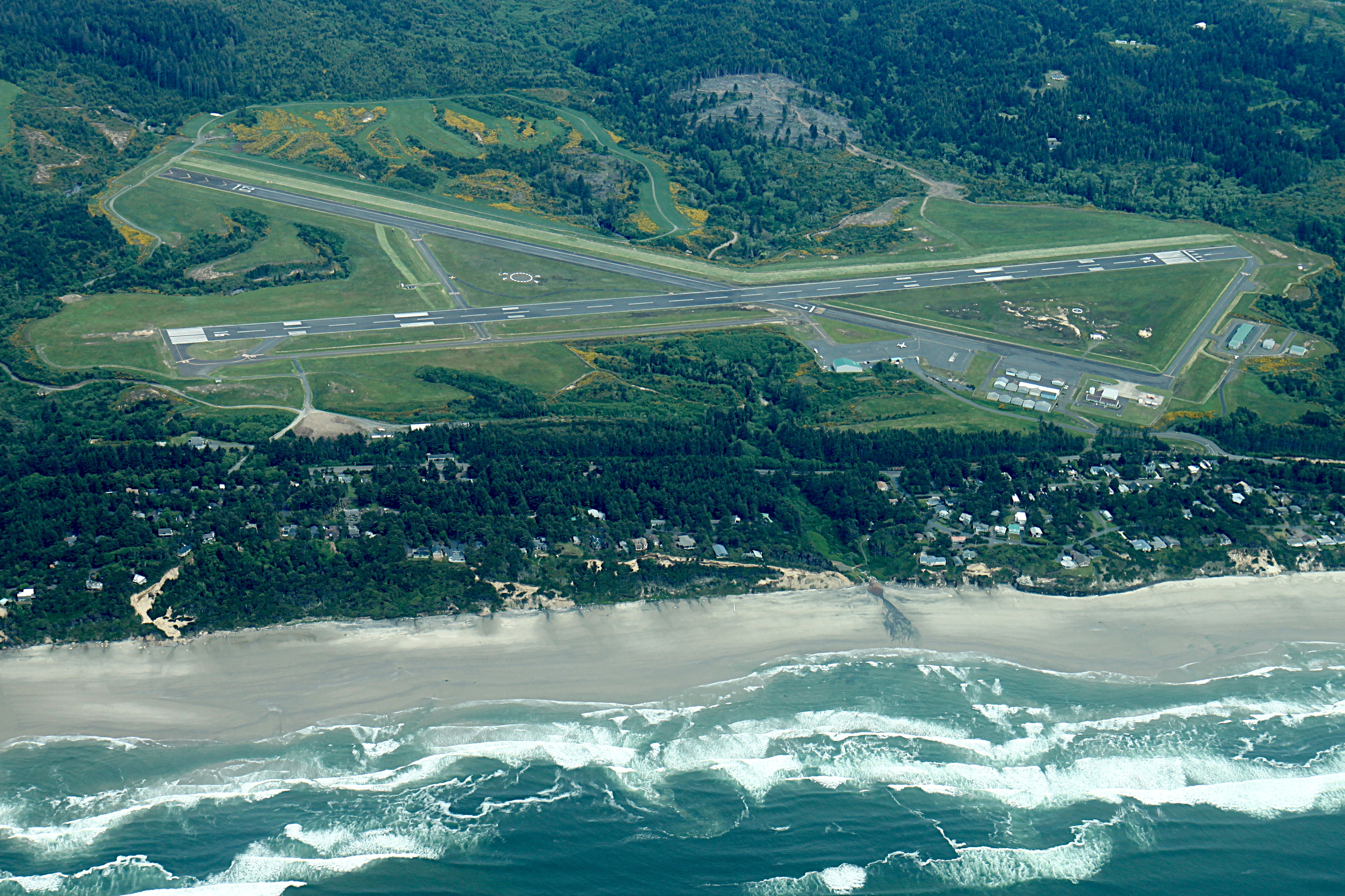
- IATA: ONP; ICAO: KONP; FAA LID: ONP

Summary
- Airport type: Public
- Owner: City of Newport
- Serves: Newport, Oregon
- Elevation AMSL: 160 ft / 49 m
- Coordinates: 44°34′49″N 124°03′28″W
- Website: Newport Municipal Airport

Map
- Location of airport in Oregon / United States ONP (the United States)

Runways
Direction	Length		Surface
Direction	ft	m	Surface
16/34	5,398	1,645	Asphalt
2/20	3,001	915	Asphalt

Statistics (2020)
- Aircraft operations (year ending 7/7/2020): 19,950
- Based aircraft: 35
- Source: Federal Aviation Administration

Newport Municipal Airport (IATA: ONP, ICAO: KONP, FAA LID: ONP) is a city-owned, public-use airport located three nautical miles (6 km) south of the central business district of Newport, a city in Lincoln County, Oregon, United States. It is included in the National Plan of Integrated Airport Systems for 2011–2015, which categorized it as a general aviation facility.

Newport Municipal formerly supported commercial passenger service with connections to Portland International Airport (PDX), but no such flights are currently scheduled. SeaPort Airlines discontinued service to Newport in July 2011. Per Federal Aviation Administration records, the airport had 1,999 passenger boardings (enplanements) in calendar year 2009 and 3,027 enplanements in 2010.

== Facilities and aircraft ==
Newport Municipal Airport covers an area of 700 acres (283 ha) at an elevation of 160 feet (49 m) above mean sea level. It has two asphalt paved runways: 16/34 is 5,398 by 100 feet (1,645 x 30 m) and 2/20 is 3,001 by 75 feet (915 x 23 m).

For the 12-month period ending July 7, 2020, the airport had 19,950 aircraft operations, an average of 55 per day: 73% general aviation, 20% military, and 7% air taxi. At that time there were 35 aircraft based at this airport: 29 single-engine, 1 multi-engine, 1 jet, 2 helicopter, and 2 military.

== Airlines and destinations ==
=== Cargo ===
Airlines	Destinations
Ameriflight	Corvallis, Portland (OR), Salem
FedEx Feeder	Corvallis, Portland (OR), Salem
