= Corvallis Municipal Airport =

Airport in Oregon, United States

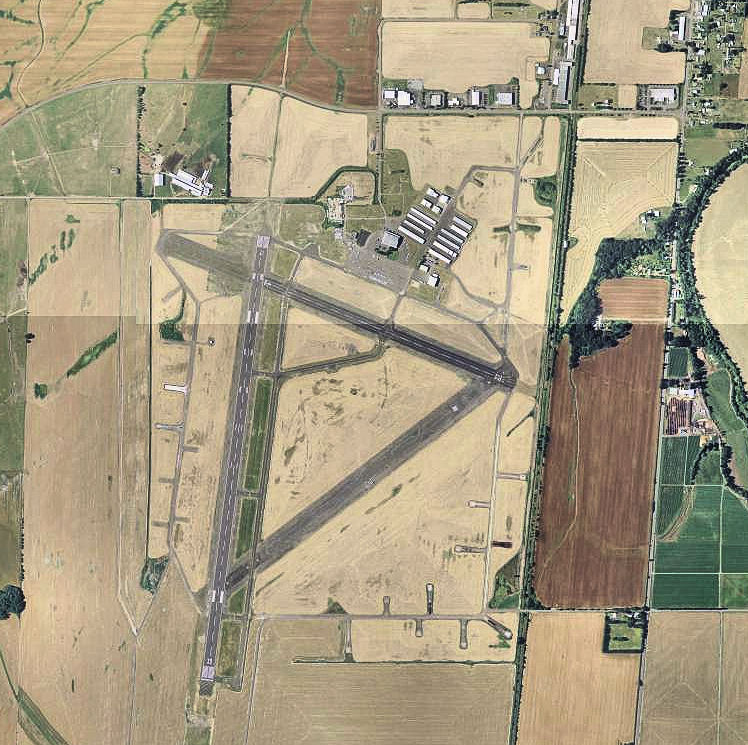
- USGS 2006 orthophoto
- IATA: CVO; ICAO: KCVO; FAA LID: CVO

Summary
- Airport type: Public
- Owner: City of Corvallis
- Serves: Corvallis, Oregon
- Elevation AMSL: 250 ft (76 m)
- Coordinates: 44°29′50″N 123°17′22″W
- Website: ci.corvallis.or.us/...

Map
- Location within Oregon

Runways
| Direction | Length | | Surface |
| Direction | ft | m | Surface |
|---|---|---|---|
| 17/35 | 5,900 | 1,798 | Asphalt |
| 10/28 | 3,100 | 945 | Asphalt |

Statistics (2018)
- Aircraft operations (year ending 11/26/2018): 52,300
- Based aircraft: 131
- Source: Federal Aviation Administration

Corvallis Municipal Airport (IATA: CVO, ICAO: KCVO, FAA LID: CVO) is in unincorporated Benton County, Oregon, 5 miles (8.0 km) southwest of Corvallis. The National Plan of Integrated Airport Systems for 2011–2015 categorized it as a general aviation facility.

The airport offers full service and self serve fuel: 100LL and Jet A. Maintenance is available on the ramp; fixed-wing flight instruction is available through Corvallis Aero Service.

== History ==
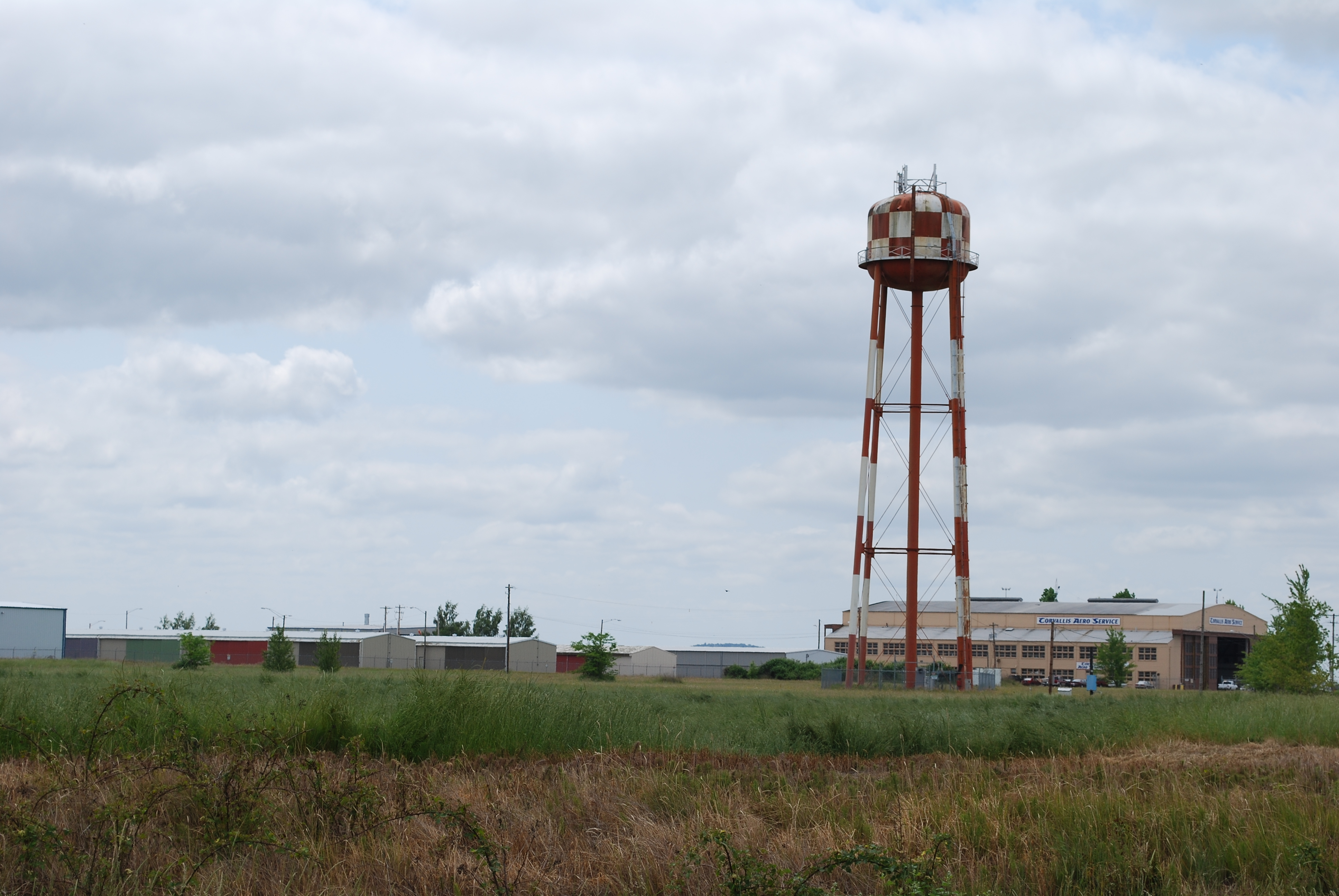
Original hangar & water tower

The site was built during World War II by the United States Army Air Forces for bomber training as Corvallis Army Airfield. The original hangar is still in use.

Airline flights (West Coast DC-3s) began in 1947; successor Hughes Airwest pulled its F27s out in 1973.

== Facilities ==
The airport covers 1,490 acres (603 ha) at an elevation of 250 feet (76 m). It has two asphalt runways: 17/35 is 5,900 by 150 feet (1,798 x 46 m) and 10/28 is 3,100 by 75 feet (945 x 23 m).

In the year ending November 26, 2018, the airport had 52,300 aircraft operations, average 143 per day: 98% general aviation, 2% military, and 1% air taxi. 131 aircraft were then based at the airport: 113 single-engine, 8 multi-engine, 2 jet, 4 helicopter, 1 glider, and 3 ultra-light.

== Airlines and destinations ==
=== Cargo ===
| Airlines | Destinations |
|---|---|
| Ameriflight | Brookings, Coos Bay, Portland (OR) |
| FedEx Feeder | Portland (OR), Salem |
