= Portland International Airport =

Airport serving Portland, Oregon, US

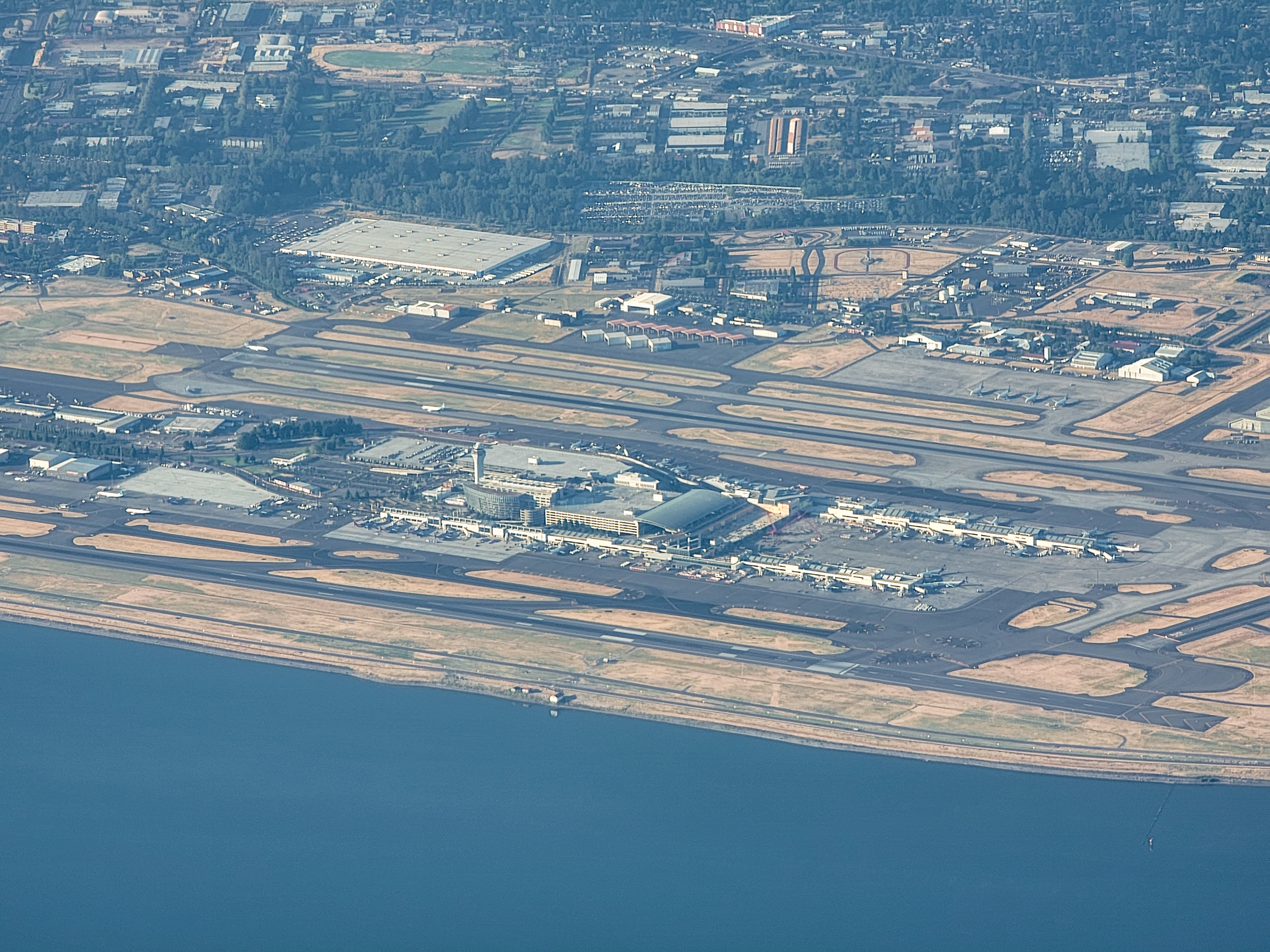
- Aerial view
- IATA: PDX; ICAO: KPDX; FAA LID: PDX

Summary
- Airport type: Public / military
- Owner/Operator: Port of Portland
- Serves: Portland metropolitan area
- Location: Portland, Oregon, U.S.
- Opened: October 13, 1940; 86 years ago
- Hub for: Alaska Airlines
- Elevation AMSL: 30 ft (9.1 m)
- Coordinates: 45°35′19″N 122°35′51″W
- Public transit access: at Portland Airport
- Website: flypdx.com

Maps
- FAA airport diagram
- Interactive map of Portland International Airport

Runways
Direction	Length		Surface
Direction	ft	m	Surface
03/21	6,000	1,829	Asphalt
10L/28R	9,825	2,995	Asphalt
10R/28L	11,000	3,353	Concrete

Statistics (2025)
- Passengers: 18,563,132 ▲6.0%
- Total PDX Flight Operations (Military & General Aviation): 208,459
- PDX Commercial Flight Operations (Cargo & Passenger): 177,040
- Cargo (metric tons): 207,081
- Source: Federal Aviation Administration

Portland International Airport (IATA: PDX, ICAO: KPDX, FAA LID: PDX) is a joint civil–military airport and the largest airport in the U.S. state of Oregon, accounting for 90% of the state's passenger air travel and more than 95% of its air cargo. It is within Portland's city limits just south of the Columbia River in Multnomah County, 6 miles (10 kilometers) by air and 12 mi (19 km) by highway northeast of downtown Portland. Portland International Airport is often referred to by its IATA airport code, PDX. The airport covers 3,000 acres (1,214 ha) of land.

Portland International Airport has direct flights to cities throughout the United States and in several other countries, including Canada, Mexico, Germany, United Kingdom, the Netherlands, and Iceland. The airport is a hub for Alaska Airlines. It also has a maintenance facility for Alaska Air subsidiary Horizon Air. General aviation services are provided at PDX by Atlantic Aviation. The Oregon Air National Guard has a base on the southwest portion of the airport property grounds, and is also the host unit of the 142nd Wing which operates the F-15EX Eagle II. Local transportation includes the MAX Red Line light rail, which takes passengers between PDX and downtown Portland, as well as farther west to Beaverton and Hillsboro. There is also Interstate 205, which connects to southwestern Washington (north from PDX) along with many suburbs of Portland (south from PDX).

== History ==
Portland's first airport was the Swan Island Municipal Airport, northwest of downtown Portland on the Willamette River. The Port of Portland purchased 256 acres (104 ha) and construction began in 1926. Charles Lindbergh flew in and dedicated the new airfield in 1927.

By 1935 it was becoming apparent to the Port of Portland that the airport was becoming obsolete. The small airfield couldn't easily be expanded, nor could it accommodate the larger aircraft and passenger loads expected to become common to Portland. Plans immediately were conceived to relocate the outdated airfield to a larger site. The Swan Island area is now used by the Port of Portland as an industrial park.

Portland International Airport was officially opened on October 13, 1940, initially as Portland-Columbia Airport.

=== Construction and early operations ===
The Portland City Council purchased the present PDX site in 1936. It was 700 acres (280 ha) bordered by the Columbia River in the north and the Columbia Slough in the south. The city council issued US$300,000 and asked the Port of Portland to sponsor a US$1.3 million Works Progress Administration (WPA) grant to develop the site into a "super airport". The project provided badly needed Great Depression-era jobs. Construction of the airport steadily employed over 1,000 men, and was described by historian Neil Barker as "Portland's most significant public works improvement during the New Deal era". The WPA and Port of Portland faced difficulties in preparing the site for construction because the low-lying area was frequently covered by flood waters from the Columbia River. Workers covered the area with over 4 million cubic yards (3,100,000 m^{3}) of sand to help drain it of water, and constructed a series of dikes to control flooding. Two runways capable of serving the modern aircraft of the time were operational by 1941. The airport was designated "Portland–Columbia Airport" to distinguish it from then-operating Swan Island Airport. During World War II, the airfield was used by the United States Army Air Forces.

The "super airport" had a terminal on the north side, off Marine Drive, and five runways (NE-SW, NW-SE, and an E-W runway forming an asterisk). This configuration was adequate until a new terminal and a longer, 8,800-foot (2,700 m) east–west runway were constructed in 1952.

In 1948, the entire airport grounds were flooded during the Vanport Flood, forcing scheduled airline services to reroute to nearby Troutdale Airport. The grounds were under water for several months.

=== New terminal (1950s) ===
Portland's first jets were Pan Am 707-321s about October 1959. A new terminal opened in 1959, which for the most part serves as the present facility. The new terminal is located to the east of the original runways, and north of the then-new 8,800 ft (2,700 m) runway. Construction of a second east–west runway to the north made this a midfield terminal. At this point, all but the NE-SW (3/21) runway in the original "X" were abandoned and turned into taxiways. 3/21 was extended for use as a cross-wind runway. "International" was added to the airport's official designation after the 1950s-era improvements.

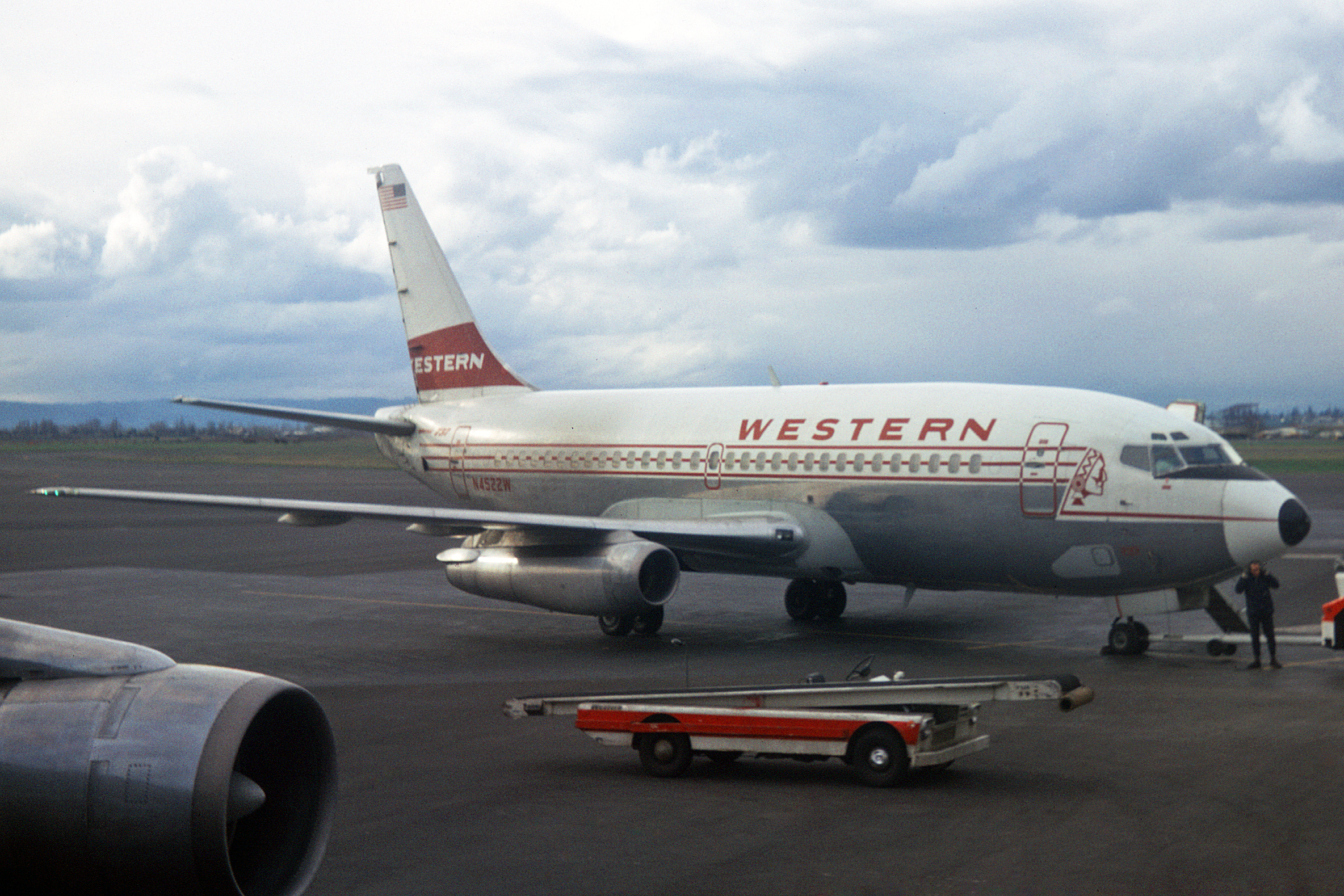
A Western Airlines Boeing 737 at the airport in 1973

The first international nonstop was Western's 720B to Vancouver, British Columbia, in 1967. Plans made in 1968 to add a third runway by means of filling in parts of the Columbia River were met with vocal public opposition and scrapped. The airport switched from screening passengers at individual gates to screening all visitors at concourse entrances in 1973 as new FAA regulations went into effect. By 1974, the airport was served by Braniff, Cascade, Continental, Eastern, Hughes Airwest, Northwest Orient, Pan Am, United and Western, and the Seattle route was served by seven airlines with aircraft as large as Boeing 747s. In 1974, the south runway was extended to 11,000 feet (3,400 m) to service the newest jumbo jets. The terminal building was renovated and expanded in 1977.

United was the dominant carrier at PDX during the regulated era and through the 1980s. Air Oregon started short-haul service from Portland following deregulation in 1978, and by 1979 had routes to seven other cities in Oregon. In April 1983, United Airlines began a flight from Chicago to Tokyo's Narita Airport that stopped in Seattle–Tacoma six days a week and in Portland once a week. The company operated the service with Boeing 747s. Meanwhile, Delta Air Lines wanted to add Tokyo to its network, but it lacked aircraft that could fly there nonstop from its Atlanta base. Consequently, the company established a "Pacific gateway" in Portland, a small hub for routes to Asia. Delta began service from Portland to Tokyo in March 1987.

By the 1980s, the terminal building began an extensive renovation in order to update PDX to meet future needs. The ticketing and baggage claim areas were renovated and expanded, and a new Concourse D for Alaska Airlines was added in 1986. Concourse E was first to be reconstructed in 1992, and featured PDX's first moving sidewalks. The Oregon Marketplace, a small shopping mall, was added in the former waiting areas behind the ticket counters. The early 1990s saw a food court and extension added to Concourse C, and the opening of the new Concourse D in 1994. This marked the first concessions inside secured areas, allowing passengers to purchase items without having to be re-screened. An expanded parking garage, new control tower, and canopy over the curbside were finished in the late 1990s. Although hailed by architectural critics, the canopy blocked views of Mount Hood from the curbside. On July 31, 1997, during construction, the garage addition collapsed due to inadequate bolts holding girders together and inadequate securing of structural members, killing three steelworkers.

Delta added domestic flights to Portland to feed the Asia routes. In 1995, the carrier offered nonstop service to Tokyo, Seoul, Nagoya, and Taipei, with the Taipei flight continuing on to Bangkok. It also flew to eight domestic cities, such as Atlanta, New York, and San Francisco. However, Delta faced obstacles to the success of its operation in Portland. These included the 1997 Asian financial crisis and complaints about the treatment of Asian passengers at the immigration facility in Portland, which led to the nickname "Deportland." Moreover, airlines were introducing more flights from the United States to Asia, allowing travelers to bypass the Portland hub. Delta reduced the number of Asian destinations to two, Tokyo and Nagoya. It finally closed the hub in March 2001 due to financial losses. The move left the airport without transpacific air service.

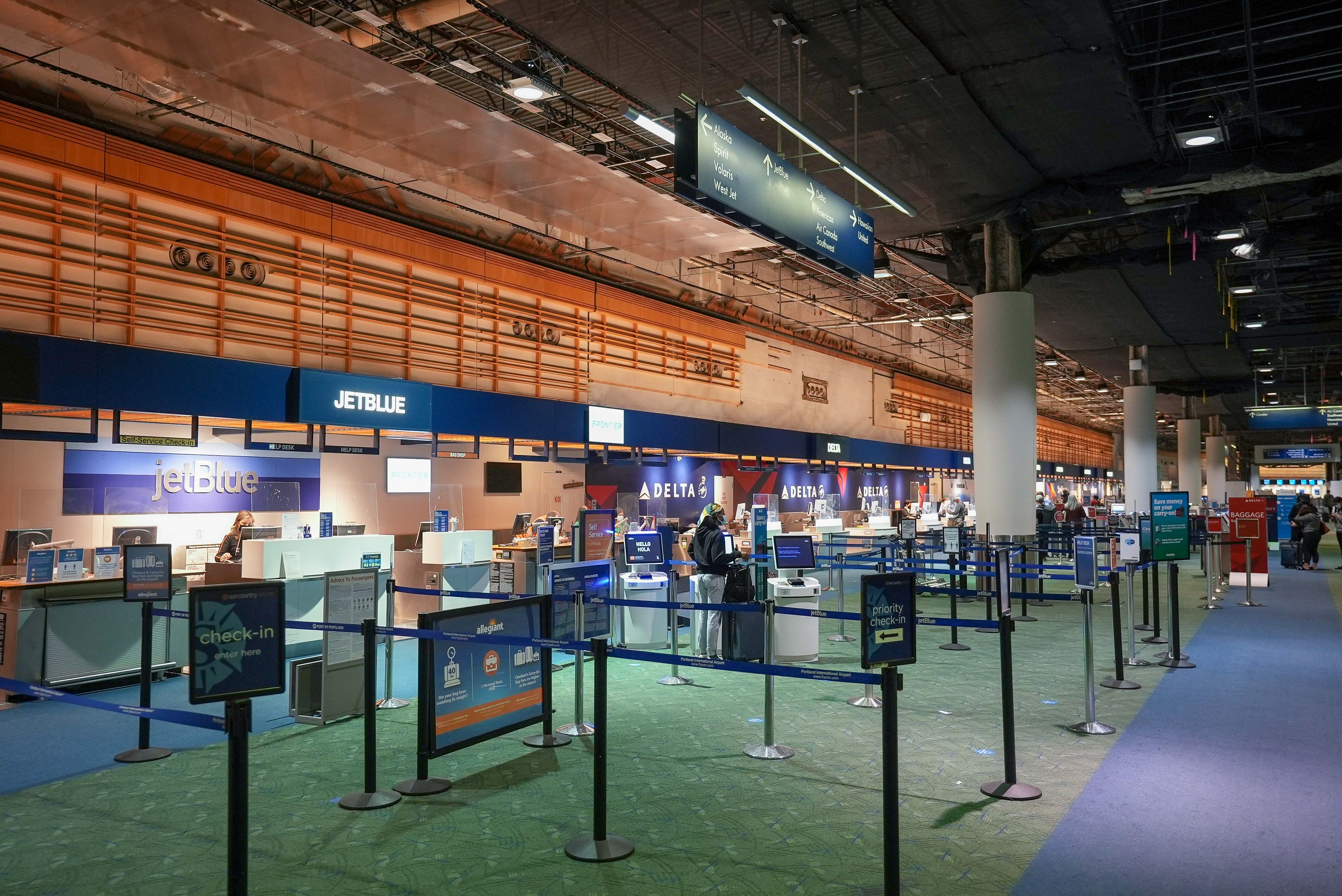
The old check-in counters before 2024

=== Terminal redesign (2000s) ===
The present H-shape of the PDX terminal, designed by Zimmer Gunsul Frasca Partnership, was completed on September 10, 2001, when the new A, B and C concourses were finished. Probably the most stunning portion of PDX's interior, the new concourses reflect a Northwest theme, focusing heavily on the nearby Columbia River. A huge celebration was to be held the following weekend, but the September 11 attacks interceded. The new concourses, designed to be public spaces, were closed to non-passengers.

At the same time as the new concourses were opened, TriMet, the metropolitan area's primary transit agency, extended its MAX Red Line light rail service. The Red Line originally provided service as far as downtown Portland only, but in 2003 it was extended west to Beaverton. Prior to 2001, TriMet service to the airport consisted of bus route 72-82nd Avenue from 1970 to 1986, and route 12-Sandy Blvd. from 1986 to 2001.

Lufthansa started direct flights to Frankfurt in March 2003. The route was operated by Airbus A340s, and was discontinued in 2009.

In June 2004, Northwest Airlines introduced nonstop service to its hub at Tokyo-Narita aboard a McDonnell Douglas DC-10. In order to funnel passengers from other American cities onto the flight, Northwest made use of its partnerships with four other carriers instead of adding its own domestic routes to Portland. This strategy was less costly than Delta's. After Northwest's merger with Delta 4 years later, the Tokyo service was retained until being cancelled in 2020 due to the global pandemic. Initially, a flight to Haneda Airport was planned to resume in 2021 but was delayed repeatedly until Delta announced in Fall 2023 that it would be relinquishing this PDX slot and consolidating transpacific service from SEA instead.

In August 2005, the concourse connector was opened. This is a long hallway on the secure side of the airport that connects the A, B and C concourses to the D and E concourses on the other side of the airport. If there is a long line at the checkpoint at one end of the airport, passengers may use the other checkpoint and walk through the connector to their desired concourse. The connector closed permanently on January 5, 2021, to make room for terminal expansion.

The airport's carpet, installed in 1987, was designed to stylize the criss-crossing north and south runways. Beginning in 2014, a new design replaced the original pattern. In response, many residents created products to celebrate the carpet as a local icon.

In December 2016, the Port of Portland renovated the security checkpoints and immigration facilities as part of its PDXNext project. This included the relocation and widening of the exit lanes by the security checkpoints and upgraded security on both sides of the terminal.

=== Terminal expansion (2020s) ===
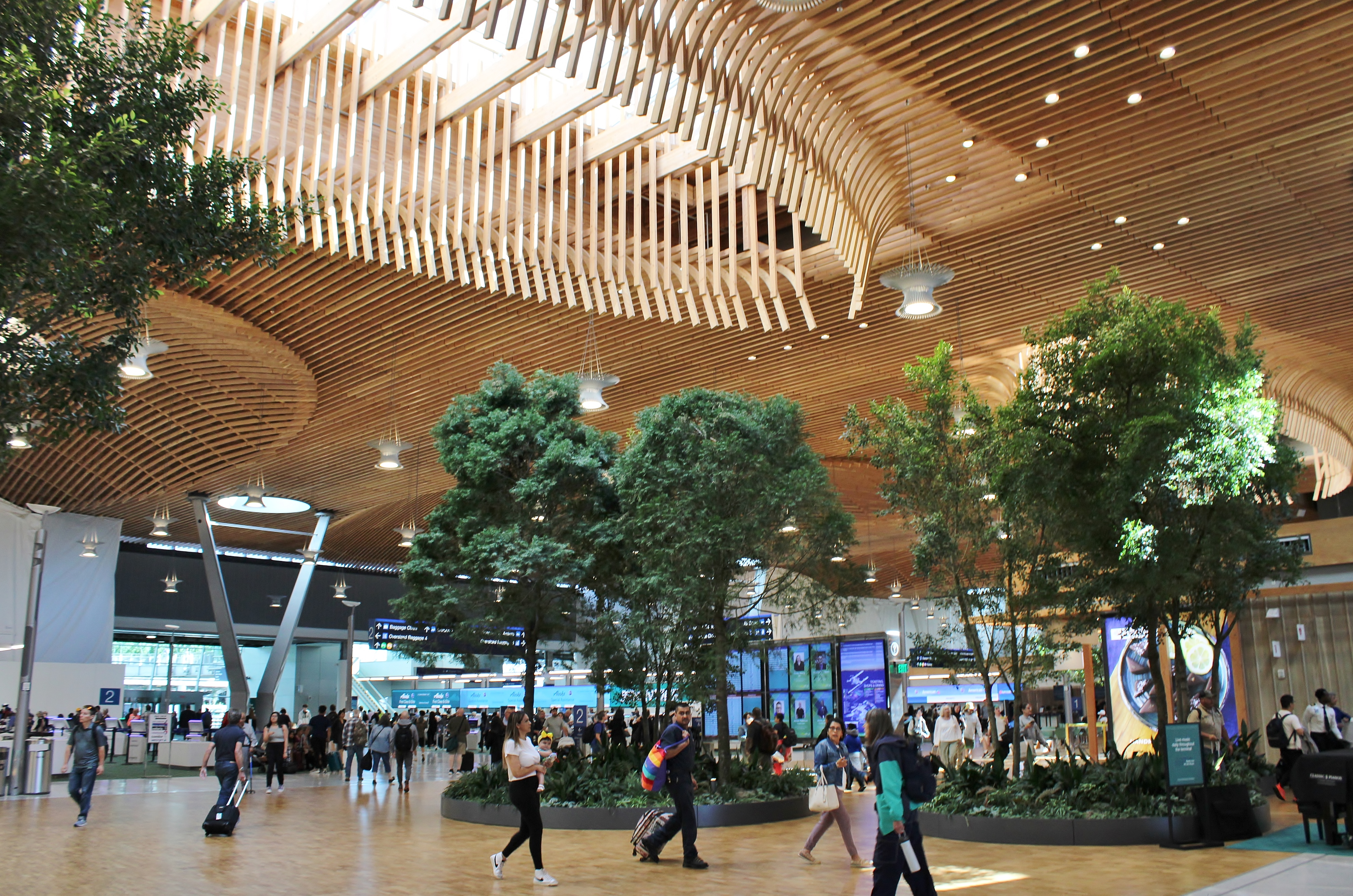
Interior of the main terminal after it reopened in August 2024

In the latter half of 2016, the Port of Portland and several airlines at PDX approved a project intended to balance the use of the terminal and concourses at Portland International Airport. The subsequent project extended Concourse E by 750 feet (230 m) and added 6 new gates to the facility. After the project, Southwest Airlines relocated its operations from Concourse C to the newly expanded Concourse E, alongside United Airlines. With the relocation of Southwest Airlines to Concourse E, Alaska Airlines, American Airlines and JetBlue Airways became the primary users of Concourses B and C. Construction on this project began in the spring of 2017 and opened to passengers on July 15, 2020.

Concourse A was demolished in November 2019 due to the age and space of the structure and was replaced by an expanded Concourse B. The extension featured 4 jet bridges, 6 ground loading zones, and improved concession stands. All Horizon operations that operated out of Concourse A was temporarily moved to Concourse C until the expanded Concourse B was completed. The new concourse opened on December 8, 2021.

In March 2020, the main terminal began a five-year expansion process to generate more open space in the pre-security area and an expansion of 150 feet toward the west. The concourse connector was closed in January 2021 and the Clocktower Plaza closed three months later to make room for the expansion. During construction, the remains of the concourse connector was reused for passengers to bypass the construction zone to get to concourses C and D. Construction of phase one of the new main terminal was expected to be complete by May 2024. One month before its scheduled opening, however, the opening date for the new terminal was delayed by three months due to construction incidents on site. Phase one of the new terminal opened to the public on August 14, 2024. In 2025, Condé Nast Traveler named Portland International Airport one of "The World’s Most Beautiful Airports for 2025."

Alaska Airlines began shifting connecting flights from Seattle to Portland in May 2025 as part of a strategy to use the latter as a reliever for overcrowding at Seattle–Tacoma.

Portland International Airport redesigned exit pathways as part of the "PDX Next" project in April 2026, reducing overcrowding and improving passenger flow between secured gates and public areas. These changes included improved paths for moving across to baggage claim, parking and ride-shares via the north or south concourses.

The new main terminal was officially declared complete on June 30, 2026, after 11 years of planning and construction.

== Facilities ==
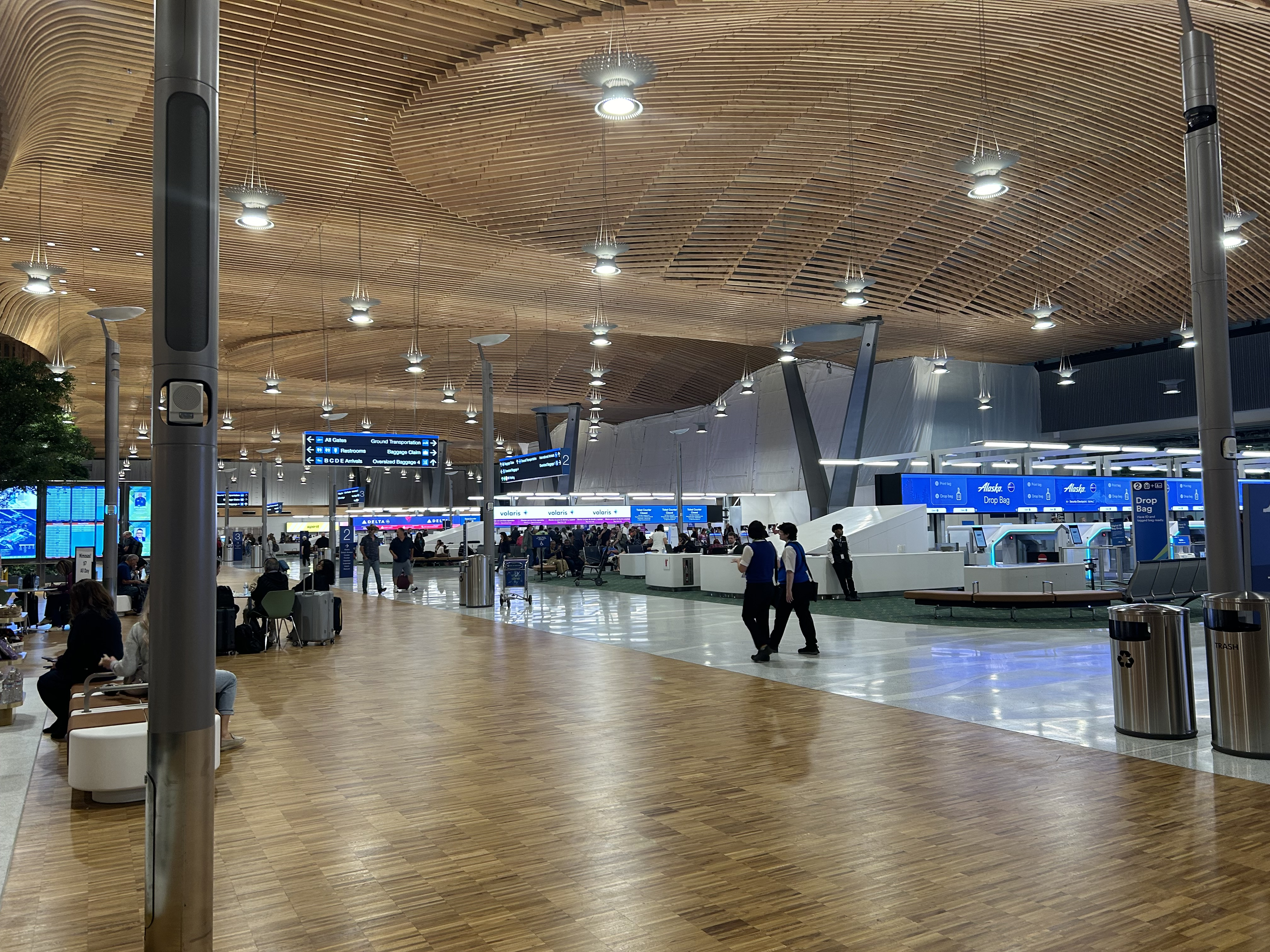
The check-in counters at PDX

The airport has one passenger terminal composed of four concourses, which are designated B, C, D, and E. There are 60 gates in total. The international section of Concourse D was renamed the Governor Victor G. Atiyeh International Concourse to honor the former Oregon governor, who was also known as "Trader Vic" for launching international tourism and trade initiatives during his gubernatorial term.

The Port of Portland requires all airport shops and restaurants to practice fair retail pricing—businesses are not allowed to charge more than at off-airport locations. Unique amenities include a microcinema run by the Hollywood Theatre; it shows free short films by Portland-based filmmakers that are primarily focused on the culture of the Pacific Northwest. The terminal also houses a distillery. In the pre-security area, there are several local food carts. In addition, the lower terminal roadway near the TriMet MAX Red Line station has a work station and tools for repairing bicycles, with tools available at the Oregon Welcome Center.

Jet fuel is supplied via the Portland Jet Line, an 8 inches (200 mm) Kinder Morgan fuel pipeline running from the Northwest Industrial area of Portland's Willbridge Terminal to the airport. Willbridge contains 40 tanks, connected to the 14 inches (360 mm) Olympic pipeline and 8 inches (200 mm) Eugene pipeline, BNSF rail, truck, and ships.

== Airlines and destinations ==
=== Passenger ===
Airlines	Destinations	Refs
Aeroméxico	Mexico City (resumes January 21, 2027)	
Air Canada Express	Vancouver	
Alaska Airlines	Albuquerque, Anchorage, Atlanta, Austin, Bellingham, Billings, Boise, Boston, Bozeman, Burbank, Chicago–O'Hare, Dallas/Fort Worth, Denver, Eugene, Everett, Fresno, Glacier Park/Kalispell, Houston–Intercontinental, Idaho Falls, Kahului, Kailua-Kona, Kansas City, Las Vegas, Lihue, Los Angeles, Medford, Missoula, Nashville, New York–JFK, Newark, Oakland, Ontario, Orange County, Orlando, Palm Springs, Phoenix–Sky Harbor, Redmond/Bend, Reno/Tahoe, Sacramento, Salt Lake City, San Diego, San Francisco, San Jose (CA), San Luis Obispo, Santa Barbara, Santa Rosa, Seattle/Tacoma, Spokane, Tri-Cities (WA), Tucson, Vancouver, Washington–National, Wenatchee; Seasonal: Cancún, Fairbanks, Fort Lauderdale, Hayden/Steamboat Springs (begins February 11, 2027), Miami, Minneapolis/St. Paul, Puerto Vallarta, San José del Cabo, Tampa	
Allegiant Air	Phoenix/Mesa, Provo; Seasonal: Appleton, Cincinnati, Des Moines, Flint, Grand Rapids, Idaho Falls, Indianapolis	
American Airlines	Charlotte, Chicago–O'Hare, Dallas/Fort Worth, Phoenix–Sky Harbor; Seasonal: Miami, Philadelphia	
American Eagle	Los Angeles	
Boutique Air	Pendleton	
British Airways	London–Heathrow	
Condor	Seasonal: Frankfurt	
Delta Air Lines	Atlanta, Detroit, Los Angeles, Minneapolis/St. Paul, New York–JFK, Salt Lake City, Seattle/Tacoma	
Delta Connection	Seattle/Tacoma	
Frontier Airlines	Denver, Las Vegas, Los Angeles,	
Hawaiian Airlines	Honolulu	
Icelandair	Seasonal: Reykjavík–Keflavík	
JetBlue	Seasonal: Boston	
KLM	Amsterdam	
SeaPort Airlines	Seattle–Boeing; Seasonal: Redmond/Bend	
Southwest Airlines	Chicago–Midway, Denver, Las Vegas, Long Beach, Oakland, Phoenix–Sky Harbor, Sacramento, San Diego, San Jose (CA); Seasonal: Baltimore, Burbank, Dallas–Love, Kansas City, St. Louis	
Sun Country Airlines	Minneapolis/St. Paul	
United Airlines	Chicago–O'Hare, Denver, Houston–Intercontinental, Newark, San Francisco, Washington–Dulles	
United Express	San Francisco	
Volaris	Guadalajara	
WestJet Encore	Seasonal: Calgary	

North America destinations map
Destinations from Portland International Airport (PDX)
Red = Year-round destination
Green = Seasonal destination
Blue = Future destination

Hawaii destinations map
Destinations from Portland International Airport
Red = Year-round destination
Green = Seasonal destination
Europe passenger destinations map
Destinations from Portland International Airport (PDX)
Red = Year-round destination
Green = Seasonal destination

=== Cargo ===
Airlines	Destinations
AirNet Express	Denver–Centennial, Oakland
Amazon Air	Cincinnati, Fairbanks, Fort Worth/Alliance, Ontario
Ameriflight	Brookings, Corvallis, Crescent City, Eugene, Florence, Grants Pass, Hermiston, Klamath Falls, La Grande, Medford, Newport, North Bend/Coos Bay, Portland/Hillsboro, Redmond/Bend, Salem
Cathay Cargo	Anchorage, Chicago–O'Hare, Hong Kong, Los Angeles
DHL Aviation	Cincinnati, Seattle/Tacoma
FedEx Express	Indianapolis, Memphis, Oakland, Ontario, Orange County, Seattle/Tacoma
FedEx Feeder	Corvallis, Eugene, Klamath Falls, Medford, Newport, North Bend/Coos Bay, Redmond/Bend, Roseburg, Salem
UPS Airlines	Chicago/Rockford, Dallas/Fort Worth, Louisville, Ontario, Seattle–Boeing, Spokane
Western Air Express	Boise, Salt Lake City, Seattle–Boeing, Spokane

== Statistics ==
=== Top destinations ===
Busiest domestic routes from PDX (January 2025 – December 2025)
Rank	City	Passengers	Carriers
1	Denver, Colorado	651,590	Alaska, Frontier, Southwest, United
2	Phoenix–Sky Harbor, Arizona	537,810	Alaska, American, Southwest
3	Los Angeles, California	522,260	Alaska, American, Delta, Frontier
4	(Washington (state)) Seattle/Tacoma, Washington	512,350	Alaska, Delta
5	Las Vegas, Nevada	481,990	Alaska, Frontier, Southwest
6	San Francisco, California	453,520	Alaska, United
7	Dallas/Fort Worth, Texas	399,180	Alaska, American
8	Chicago–O'Hare, Illinois	390,240	Alaska, American, United
9	Salt Lake City, Utah	300,370	Alaska, Delta, Frontier
10	Minneapolis/St. Paul, Minnesota	260,090	Alaska, Delta, Sun Country

Busiest international routes from PDX (July 2024 – June 2025)
Rank	City	Passengers	Carriers
1	Vancouver, Canada	162,561	Air Canada, Alaska
2	Guadalajara, Mexico	153,239	Volaris
3	Amsterdam, Netherlands	120,344	Delta, KLM
4	London–Heathrow, United Kingdom	116,760	British Airways
5	Puerto Vallarta, Mexico	59,810	Alaska
6	San José del Cabo, Mexico	57,357	Alaska
7	Reykjavík–Keflavík, Iceland	55,397	Icelandair
8	Calgary, Canada	38,118	WestJet
9	Frankfurt, Germany	22,350	Condor
10	Toronto–Pearson, Canada	13,554	Air Canada Rouge

=== Airline market share ===
Largest airlines at PDX (August 2024 – July 2025)
Rank	Airline	Passengers	Share
1	Alaska Airlines	5,172,000	30.26%
2	Southwest Airlines	2,326,000	13.61%
3	Delta Air Lines	2,069,000	12.10%
4	United Airlines	1,853,000	10.84%
5	Horizon Air	1,714,000	10.03%
–	Other airlines	3,960,000	23.17%

=== Annual traffic ===
Annual passenger traffic at PDX, 2003–2025
Year	Passengers	Year	Passengers	Year	Passengers
2003	12,400,010	2013	15,029,569	2023	16,486,688
2004	13,038,057	2014	15,916,509‡	2024	17,518,499
2005	13,879,701	2015	16,850,952	2025	18,563,132
2006	14,043,489	2016	18,352,767	2026	
2007	14,654,222	2017	19,080,494	2027	
2008	14,299,234	2018	19,882,788	2028	
2009	12,929,675	2019	19,891,365	2029	
2010	13,192,857	2020	7,100,493‡	2030	
2011	13,675,924	2021	11,806,921	2031	
2012	14,390,750‡	2022	13,639,215‡	2032	

‡ = Revised data.

== Ground transportation ==
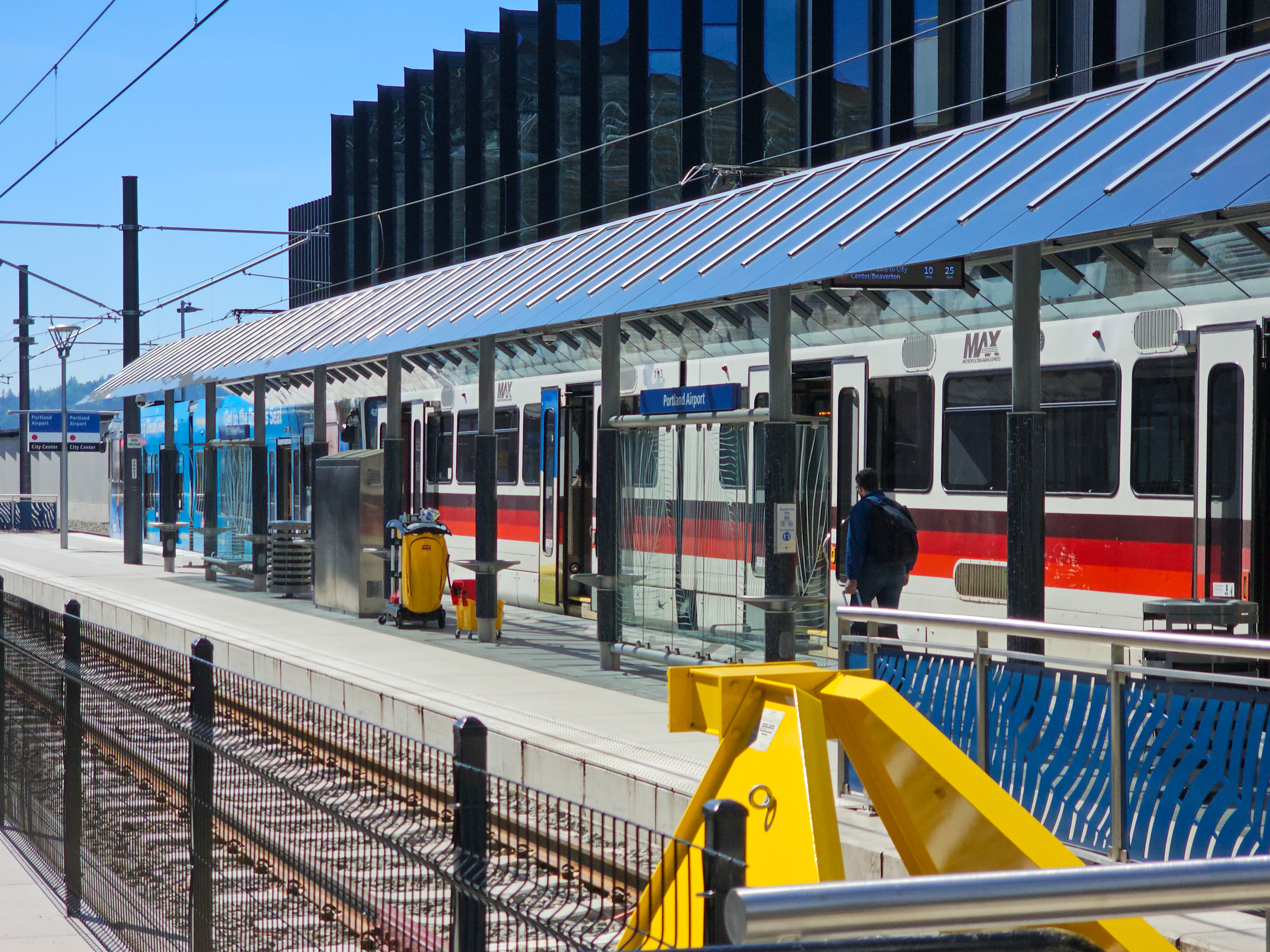
A MAX Red Line light-rail train at Portland Airport station

Public transit service to the airport is provided by TriMet, the metropolitan area's primary transit agency, with its MAX Red Line light rail service. The Red Line service operates through downtown Portland and west to Beaverton. The airport's light rail station is located only about 150 ft (50 m) from the airport's baggage claim area.

C-Tran route 67 bus connects the airport to Fisher's Landing Transit Center in east Vancouver, Washington. Pacific Crest Lines also offers daily service to Union Station, Salem and Bend.

By road, the terminal is accessible from an exit on Interstate 205. The exit is numbered 24A when traveling northbound and 24 when traveling southbound.

== Accidents and incidents ==
- On October 1, 1966, West Coast Airlines Flight 956 crashed in a desolate section of the Mount Hood National Forest during descent into Portland International Airport. Of the 18 passengers and crew, there were no survivors. The probable cause of the accident was "the descent of the aircraft below its clearance limit and below that of surrounding obstructing terrain, but the Board was unable to determine the cause of such descent." The accident was the first hull loss of a Douglas DC-9.
- On December 28, 1978, United Airlines Flight 173 was en route to Portland International Airport from Stapleton International Airport in Denver, Colorado. On approach to Portland International Airport, the crew lowered the landing gear which caused a loud thump, abnormal vibration, unusual yaw, and the landing gear indicator lights failed to light. The plane circled Portland while the crew investigated the problem. After about an hour, the plane exhausted its fuel supply and crashed into the suburban neighborhood of East Burnside Street and NE 158th Ave. Of the 189 passengers and crew on board, ten died and 24 more were injured. An investigation revealed that the crash was caused by "the failure of the captain to properly monitor the aircraft's fuel state". This accident's investigation led to substantially improved aviation safety by widespread adoption of crew resource management which emphasizes crew teamwork and communication instead of a command hierarchy.
- On January 20, 1983, Northwest Airlines Flight 608, a Boeing 727 with 41 passengers and crew enroute from Seattle-Tacoma International Airport to PDX was hijacked by a male hijacker. He informed a flight attendant that he had a bomb in a box and wanted to be flown to Afghanistan. The hijacker agreed to land at PDX to refuel and shortly after, negotiations began. When the hijacker was engaged, federal agents boarded the aircraft through a cockpit window. When the hijacker was confronted, he threw the box at the agents and one of the agents fired one shot and killed the hijacker. It was later discovered the box contained no explosives.
- On February 16, 2008, visibility of 1/8 mile was a possible factor in the fatal accident that took the life of the pilot, Oregon doctor Richard Otoski, a Klamath Falls dermatologist flying his Columbia 400. The accident took place just short of runway 10R at Portland International Airport. Otoski was the only person on board the aircraft, manufactured by the former Lancair Company. "Damn it... we're gonna crash" were the last words PDX controllers heard from N621ER. The aircraft was apparently in the process of making another missed approach in poor visibility following the ILS when it clipped an airport perimeter fence, crashed, and soon caught fire. The aircraft had departed from Klamath Falls 90 minutes earlier.
- On January 5, 2024, Alaska Airlines Flight 1282, a 3 month-old Boeing 737 MAX 9 was en route to Ontario, California from Portland when a door plug (a structure installed to replace an optional emergency exit door located in the rear mid-cabin just behind the wings) tore off mid-flight. The flight experienced uncontrolled decompression and was forced to turn around and perform an emergency landing at PDX, resulting in three minor injuries. The incident caused Boeing to temporarily ground nearly all 737 MAX 9's to investigate the maintenance of the door plug.
- On March 18, 2024, an Alaska Airlines Boeing 737-800 arriving from Washington, D.C., suffered a cracked windshield while landing. The plane landed safely with no one among the 165 people on board being injured. The airline repaired the aircraft.

== See also ==
- Oregon World War II Army Airfields
- Pearson Field
- Portland-Mulino Airport
- Tourism in Portland, Oregon
- Western Air Defense Force
