= McNary Field =

Airport in Salem, Oregon, U.S.

McNary Field Salem-Willamette Valley Airport Salem Army Airfield

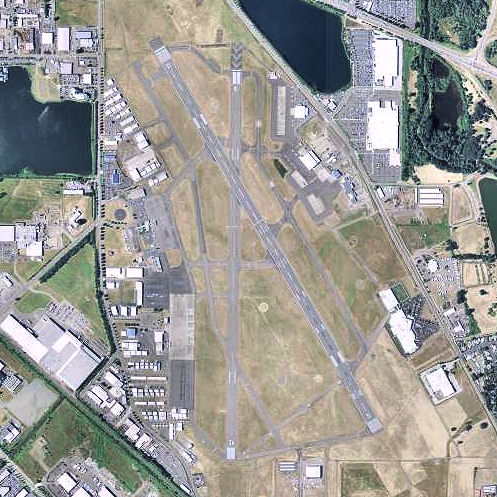
- USGS 2006 orthophoto
- IATA: SLE; ICAO: KSLE; FAA LID: SLE

Summary
- Airport type: Public
- Owner: City of Salem
- Serves: Salem, Oregon
- Elevation AMSL: 213 ft (65 m)
- Coordinates: 44°54′34″N 123°00′09″W
- Website: www.flysalem.com

Maps
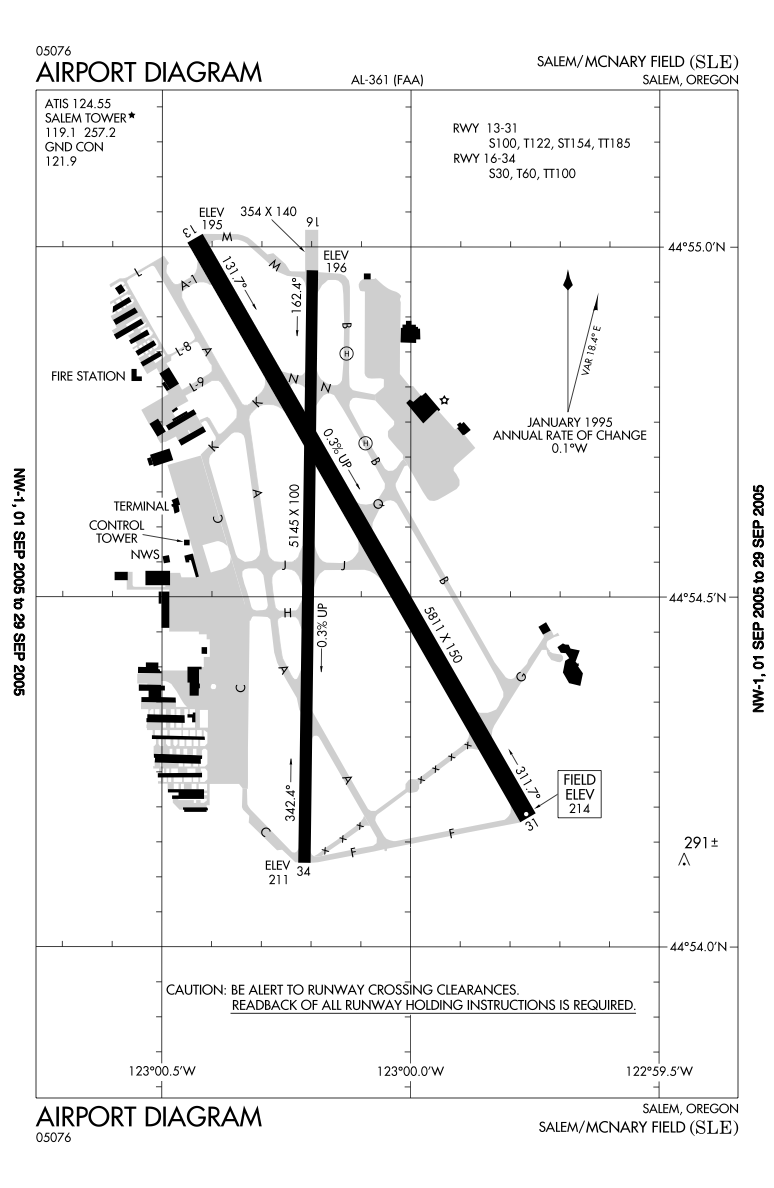
- FAA airport diagram
- Interactive map of McNary Field

Runways
Direction	Length		Surface
Direction	ft	m	Surface
13/31	5,811	1,771	Asphalt
16/34	5,146	1,568	Asphalt

Helipads
Number	Length		Surface
Number	ft	m	Surface
H1	37	11	Concrete

Statistics (2022)
- Aircraft operations: 45,357
- Based aircraft: 182
- Source: Federal Aviation Administration

McNary Field (IATA: SLE, ICAO: KSLE, FAA LID: SLE) (Salem-Willamette Valley Airport, formerly Salem Municipal Airport) is a public-use airport in Marion County, Oregon, United States. The airport is located two miles southeast of downtown Salem, which owns it. The airport is named for U.S. Senator Charles L. McNary of Oregon, who had died in February 1944, a couple of years after the airport became operational.

McNary Field has had scheduled airline flights, including service on Delta Connection that ended in October 2008. The National Plan of Integrated Airport Systems for 2011–2015 categorized it as a primary commercial service facility based on enplanements in 2008 (more than 10,000 per year). Federal Aviation Administration records say the airport had 15,205 passenger boardings (enplanements) in calendar year 2008, an increase from 12,979 in 2007.

The Oregon Army National Guard - Army Aviation Support Facility (AASF) and charter flights also use the facilities. McNary Field is the home of the Oregon Department of Aviation.

On June 10, 2024, the Salem City Council voted to change the name of the airport from Salem Municipal Airport to Salem-Willamette Valley Airport, with the goal of encouraging tourism by highlighting the airport's location in the Willamette Valley AVA.

== Airline service ==
United Airlines was the first airline to serve Salem beginning in 1941–42. Their Boeing 737-200 mainline jet service operated a roundtrip San Francisco (SFO) - Medford (MFR) - Salem (SLE) - Portland (PDX) route was discontinued in 1980. All passenger airline service into McNary Field ended in 1993. The city campaigned to bring scheduled passenger service back, and on June 7, 2007, Delta Connection operated by SkyWest Airlines on behalf of Delta Air Lines began serving Salem with two CRJ-200 regional jet flights per day to Salt Lake City (SLC) that ended on October 9, 2008. Earlier, Horizon Air commuter turboprops flew between Salem and Portland.

In April 2011, SeaPort Airlines, an Oregon-based commuter airline, began 11 weekly flights between Newport Municipal Airport (Oregon), Salem and Portland International Airport. The service was short-lived, and three months later in July 2011 SeaPort Airlines ended all service into Salem.

On April 10, 2023, the City Council approved an air carrier agreement with an undisclosed airline to begin service to Salem. Initial service would be to Las Vegas and the Los Angeles area. Future service could include Phoenix and the San Francisco Bay Area. Terminal renovations were then completed to accommodate the TSA and ground support equipment was purchased to accommodate the new airline service. On July 13, 2023, Avelo Airlines announced it was planning to initiate scheduled passenger service to Burbank, California (BUR) and Las Vegas (LAS) with direct flights to each destination operated twice weekly with Boeing 737 mainline jets beginning in early October 2023. Avelo then announced that it would operate non stop 737 jet service to commence in early May 2024 with twice weekly flights to Santa Rosa, CA (STS) in Sonoma County. Avelo also increased Burbank flights to 3 round trips per week.

In July 2025, Avelo announced it was shuttering all service on the West Coast, with service to Salem ending in August. This decision would again leave McNary Field without a commercial airline. The company cited exclusively financial reasons for the decision, which came amid controversy and boycotts in response to Avelo's contract to provide deportation flights to the Department of Homeland Security (and ICE) beginning the first May of Donald Trump's second presidency.

== Facilities ==
McNary Field covers 751 acres (304 ha) at an elevation of 213 feet (65 metres). It has two asphalt runways: 13/31, 5,811 ft (1,771 m) long with an ILS, and 5,146 ft (1,569 m) runway (16/34). There is one helipad: H1 measuring, 37 by 37 feet (11 by 11 m).

The airport has a control tower, a restaurant, a general aviation center including limited flight training, and a small terminal. The terminal building is about 13,830 square feet (1,285 m^{2}) after an expansion in 2010 that enlarged the waiting area and added airport administration offices, ticket counters, car rental counters, a baggage area. The terminal has one departure gate behind security as well as a general gate for arriving passengers in front of security. The expanded facility is more than twice the size of the old terminal, and was designed by Mead & Hunt. The control tower is 44 feet (13 m) high, designed by Hunt/Avco and built in 1973. It consists of a square tower with a hexagonal cab.

In the year ending December 31, 2022, the airport had 45,357 aircraft operations, average 124 per day: 86% general aviation, 7% military, 8% air taxi, and <1% commercial. 182 aircraft were then based at the airport: 136 single-engine, 10 multi-engine, 6 jet, 9 helicopter, 2 glider, and 19 military. In July 2024, it was announced that McNary Field would receive $245,000 in federal grant money from the FAA "to fix an existing paved taxiway."

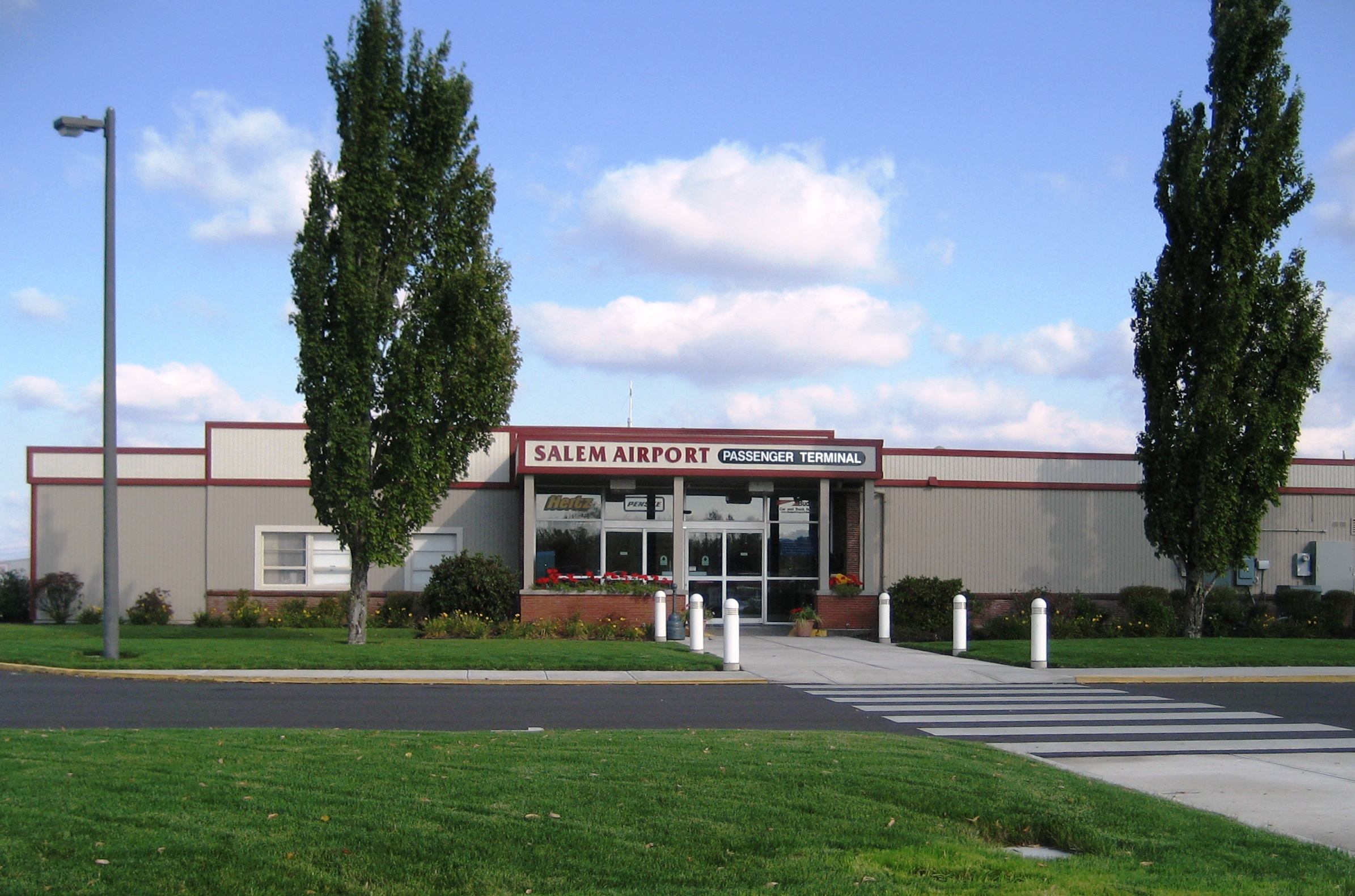
Terminal building in 2008

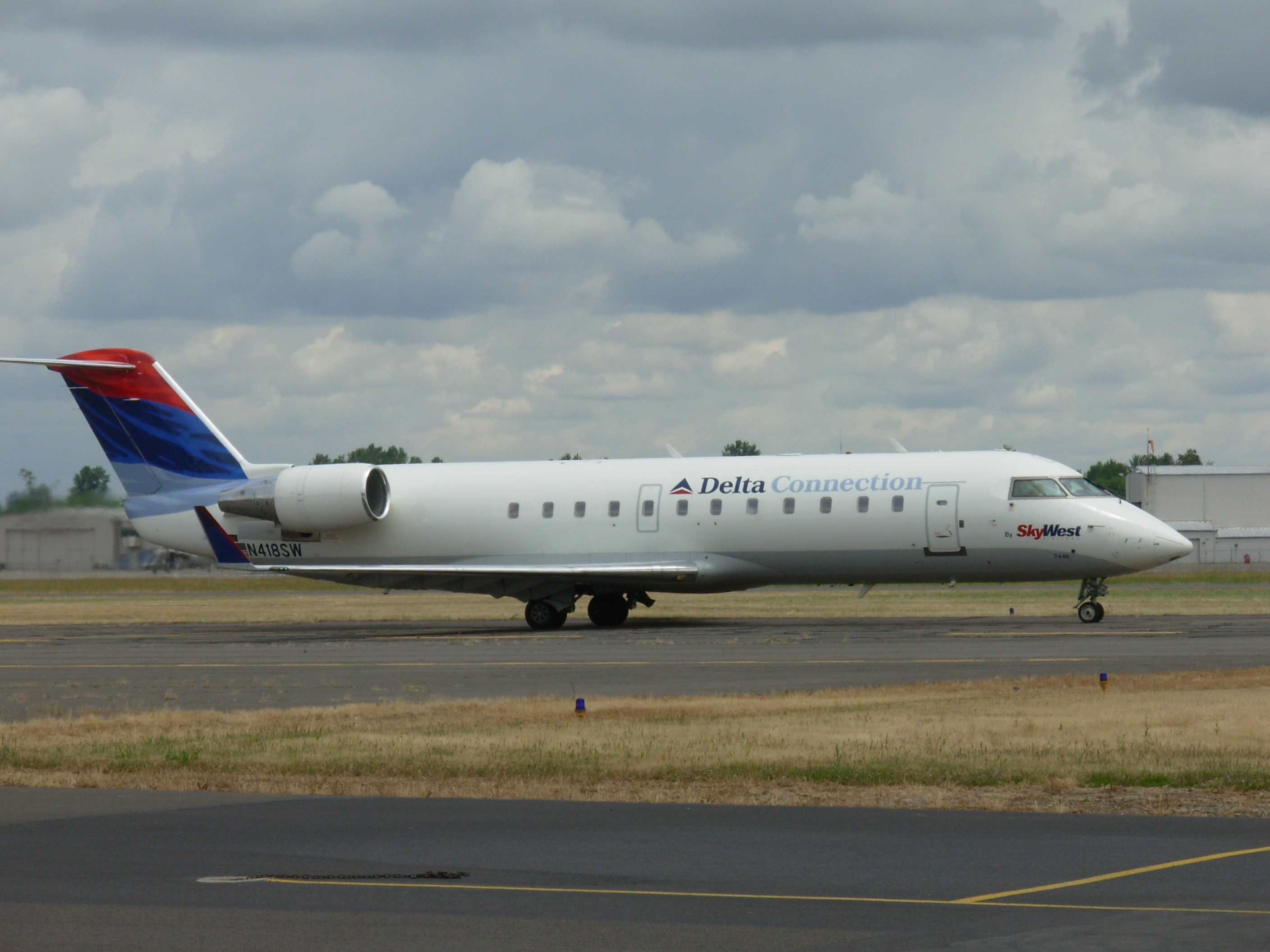
Delta Connection, operated by SkyWest Airlines, served the airport from June 2007 to October 2008.

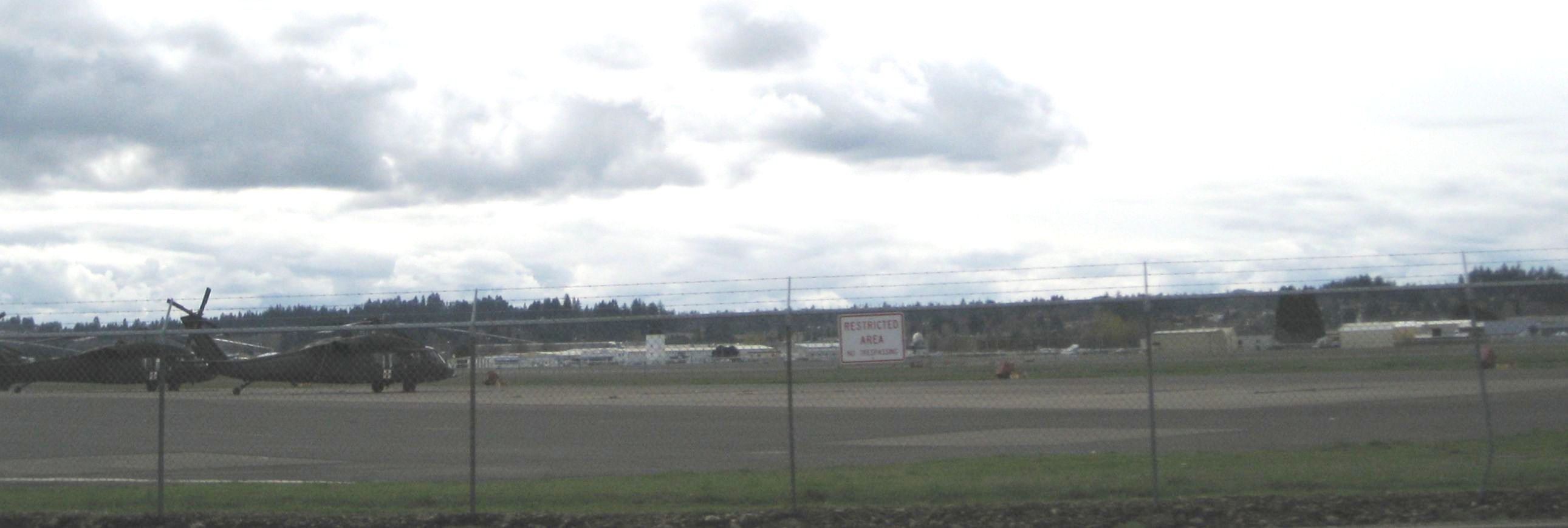
Oregon National Guard helicopters at McNary Field

== Airlines and destinations ==
=== Cargo ===
Airlines	Destinations
Ameriflight	Portland (OR)
FedEx Feeder operated by Empire Airlines	Portland (OR)

== See also ==
- Economy of Oregon
- Eugene Airport
- List of Avelo Airlines destinations
- List of Class D airports in the United States
- Oregon Tourism Commission
- Oregon wine
- Oregon World War II Army Airfields
- Portland International Airport
- Transportation in Oregon
