= Ameriflight =

Airline of the United States

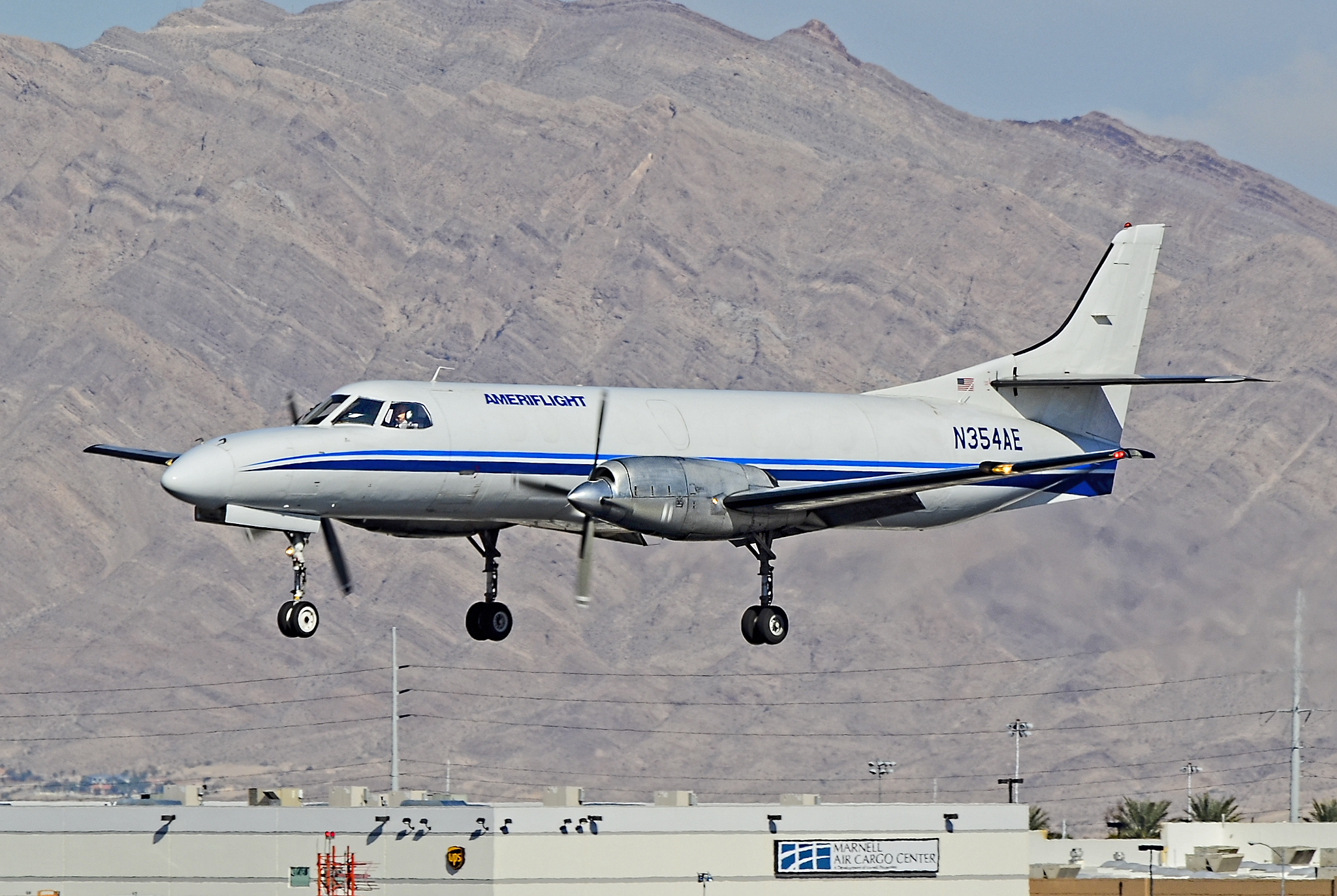
IATA	ICAO	Call sign
A8	AMF	AMFLIGHT
- Founded: 1968; 58 years ago
- Operating bases: Burbank; Dallas/Fort Worth; El Paso; Lansing (MI); Manchester (NH); Omaha; Ontario (CA); Phoenix-Sky Harbor; Portland (OR); San Antonio (TX); Spokane
- Subsidiaries: Wiggins Airways
- Fleet size: 125
- Destinations: 105
- Headquarters: Dallas/Fort Worth, Texas, United States
- Key people: Jim Martell (Owner, Chairman); Sandy Smith (Co-chairman); Patrick Fluegeman (President, COO); Will Folger (Chief Financial Officer); Robert Barrett (Vice President of Business Development); Pat Kremer (Vice President of Technical Operations); Ryan Balzarini (Vice President of Flight Operations); Sheri Larkin (Corporate Controller); Frank Vaughan (Vice President of Human Resources)
- Employees: 600+
- Website: https://w3.ameriflight.com/

Ameriflight LLC is an American cargo airline with headquarters at the Dallas/Fort Worth International Airport. It is the largest United States FAA Part 135 cargo carrier, operating scheduled and contract cargo services from 19 bases to destinations in 250 cities across 43 US states as well as in Canada, Mexico, the Caribbean, and South America. Ameriflight serves major financial institutions, freight forwarders, laboratories, and overnight couriers in the US, and provides feeder services for overnight express carriers nationwide and internationally. Ameriflight averages 525 daily departures with over 100,000 combined flight hours annually and a 99.5% on-time performance. Ameriflight employs over 700 people (225 pilots, 140 mechanics).

== History ==
Ameriflight was established in 1968 as California Air Charter. The company's first route, CalAir 103, was bank mail and cancelled checks flown in a Piper Cherokee Six (PA-32) from Hollywood-Burbank Airport to Riverside Municipal Airport, and then on to Blythe Airport near the Colorado River.

The company merged with United Couriers, a wholly owned subsidiary of ATI Systems International (ATIS), in 1971. In April 1993, the fixed-wing division of Wings Express (which was based at Van Nuys Airport) was purchased, and the outstanding shares of Sports Air Travel were acquired in mid-1997. In March 2007, when Canadian company Garda Security bought ATIS, Ameriflight was sold to a group of investors that included the company's president, Gary Richards.

In May 2014, the airline announced it was moving its headquarters to Dallas-Fort Worth International Airport (DFW). Maintenance operations and flight operations were scheduled to move to DFW.

In late 2014, Ameriflight reached agreement to acquire Wiggins Airways (48 aircraft and 100 employees), which would result in Ameriflight becoming the largest regional air cargo carrier in the world with 163 aircraft in its fleet.

== Flight services ==
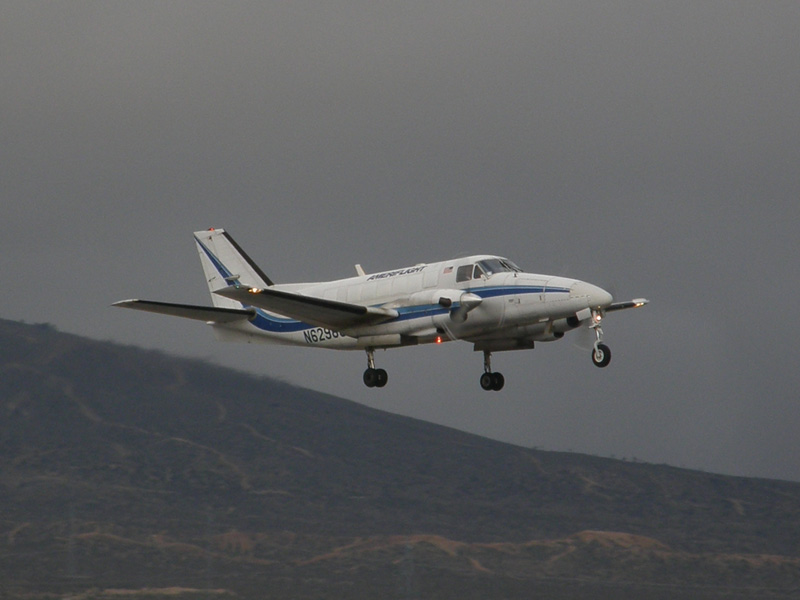
An Ameriflight Beechcraft Model 99 upon take-off from Mojave Air and Space Port (2009)

The majority of Ameriflight's operations consists of air feeder service for major package express integrators such as UPS, FedEx, and DHL. Its other significant customers include Lantheus Medical Imaging, ACS Products, and Mallinckrodt Pharmaceuticals. On schedules set by the customers, cargo is received in the early morning from large jet freighters at hub airports and distributed by Ameriflight airplanes to smaller communities whose traffic (or airports) would not support the big airplanes. In the evening, the Ameriflight aircraft fly back to the hubs to feed them with cargo from the smaller communities, which is carried onwards to the integrators' distribution centers for sorting and redistribution to the ultimate destinations.

Although demand is decreasing as use of digital imaging and electronic data transfer increases, Ameriflight also transports high-priority intercity financial documents. Pharmaceuticals, film for development, medical laboratory samples, and other miscellaneous cargo are also carried.

Ameriflight is one of the few Part 135 cargo carriers in the U.S. with a special Department of Transportation permit to carry high Transport Index radioactive cargo, an important element in the company's time-critical radioactive medical raw materials business, which transports radioactive "generator" materials between points of manufacture and cities where it is used to produce materials used in diagnostics and cancer therapy.

In addition to scheduled flying (with contract schedules set by customers), all Ameriflight bases can respond to unscheduled on-demand cargo flights to destinations in Alaska, Canada, the contiguous US, Mexico, the Caribbean, and South America. A single King Air 200 was used for on-demand passenger charter flights, but has since been retired.

== Fleet ==
=== Current ===
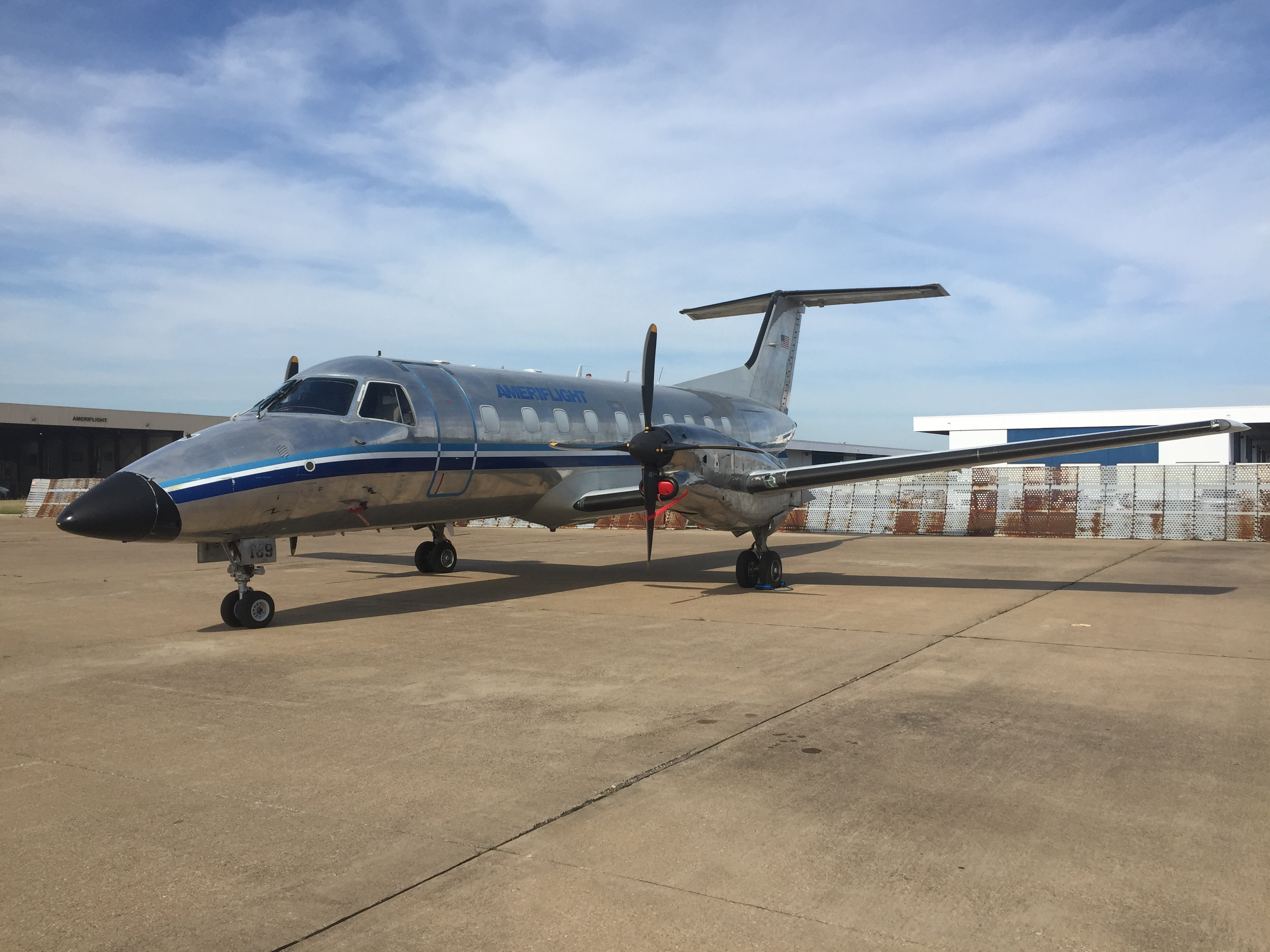
An Ameriflight EMB-120ER Brasilia rests on the ramp at the company's new DFW Airport headquarters.

The Ameriflight fleet includes these aircraft in November 2024:

Aircraft	In fleet	Orders	Maximum payload
Beechcraft Model 99	52 (as of August 2025)	0	3,500 lb
SA227 Metroliner	31	0	4,900 lb
Beechcraft 1900C	26(as of August 2025)	0	5,800 lb
Saab 340B	4(as of August 2025)	0	7,500 lb
Embraer EMB 120ER Brasilia	12(as of August 2025)	0	8,000 lb
Total	125	0	—

=== Former fleet ===
Aircraft	In fleet	Retired	Maximum payload	Notes
Cessna 402	4	2005		
Cessna 208 Caravan	4	1992		
Dassault Falcon 20	2	1995		
de Havilland Canada DHC-6 Twin Otter	6	1990		
King Air 200	1	2015		Charter
Learjet 35A	5	2011		
Mitsubishi MU-2	1	1987		
Piper PA-31	42	2019		
Piper PA-32R	20	2005		
Piper PA-32	2	1986		
Piper PA-28R	5	1996		
Piper PA-23	3	1987		
Piper PA-31T Cheyenne	1	1992		
Total	33	0		

== Accidents and incidents ==
Date	Flight Number	Information
15 September 1989	AMF1952	An Ameriflight Piper PA-31-350 Navajo Chieftain (registered N70PE) on a cargo flight from Ontario International Airport to Santa Barbara Municipal Airport experienced an engine failure and the aircraft eventually rolled sharply right before impacting the ground in a near inverted attitude about a mile northwest of Runway 26R. The pilot was killed in the crash. The NTSB determined that a propeller blade separated from the right propeller hub. The rest of the propeller hub then separated striking the right front of the fuselage and the damage done made the aircraft uncontrollable.
03 March 1994	AMF107	An Ameriflight Piper PA-31-350 Navajo Chieftain (registered N78DE), on a cargo flight, departed from Hollywood-Burbank Airport flying nonstop to Oakland International Airport. Around 23:46 local time, the aircraft collided with terrain near the summit of Mount Pinos, about 9 miles west of Frazier Park. The airplane was destroyed, and the ATP-rated pilot was killed in the crash. The NTSB determined the probable cause was the pilot's failure to select a cruise altitude to ensure adequate terrain clearance. Contributing factors related to the nighttime condition and to the pilot's lack of attentiveness.
16 November 1994	-	An Ameriflight Beechcraft Model 99 (registered N63995) on a cargo flight from Burbank-Glendale-Pasadena Airport to Oakland International Airport descended steeply into the ground from cruise altitude near Avenal, and the pilot was killed in the crash. The probable cause could not be determined, although pilot incapacitation was suspected.
23 December 1995	-	While performing a 135.297 instrument competency check, an Ameriflight Piper PA-31-350 Navajo Chieftain (registered N27954) impacted terrain in the hills southeast of Oakland International Airport (KOAK) around 00:19 local time. The airplane was destroyed, and the two pilots were killed in the crash. In the National Transportation Safety Board's narrative, the cause was determined to be the failure of the air traffic controller to comply with instructions contained in the Air Traffic Control Handbook and vectoring an aircraft at below the minimum vectoring altitude (MVA). In addition, the ATC supervisor's failure to detect and correct the situation. Lower situational awareness by the flight crew was also considered a contributing factor.
13 August 1997	AMF262	A Beechcraft 1900 (registered N3172A) was damaged in a crash, landing at Seattle–Tacoma International Airport and destroyed in a fire that had erupted from spilled fuel. Investigation into the accident determined that the airplane had been overloaded and that the pilot had been misinformed by staff members of the company that contracted for the flight about the cargo weight and center of gravity, which led to a stall during the landing flare.
12 February 1999	AMF1902	A Beechcraft C99 (registered N205RA) crashed into a canyon of the White Mountains, while en route on a positioning flight from Tonopah Airport to Bishop Airport. The wreckage was finally discovered two days later. According to relatives and witnesses, the pilot (who was killed in the crash) had stated his intent to take aerial pictures of the local scenery and likely lost control of the aircraft while doing so.
14 October 1999	AMF121	An Ameriflight Piper PA-31-350 Navajo Chieftain (registered N1024B) on a cargo flight from North Las Vegas Airport (KVGT) to Sacramento Executive Airport (KSAC) impacted terrain 11 miles north of KVGT airport. The pilot was fatally injured. The National Transportation Safety Board determined that the probable cause was the failure of the pilot-in-command to maintain separation from terrain while operating under visual flight rules. Contributing factors were the improper issuance of a suggested heading by air traffic control personnel, inadequate flight progress monitoring by radar departure control personnel, and failure of the radar controller to identify a hazardous condition and issue a safety alert.
29 November 2003	AMF1966	Flight 1966 from Boeing Field crashed into trees in bad visibility conditions while approaching its destination Felts Field, in which the pilot was killed. The aircraft involved, a Fairchild Metro III registered N439AF, had one of its two instrument landing system receivers deferred due to intermittent flag activity at the time of the accident. The pilot had initiated his final descent late and then descended through the glide slope.
18 March 2006	AMF2591	A Beechcraft Model C99 (registered N54RP) crashed during a flight from Helena to Butte in Montana about 8.1 miles southwest of its destination, killing the two pilots on board. The plane impacted trees and mountainous terrain, where the wreckage was only located on March 20. The cause of the crash was determined to be the pilot's failure to follow the proper instrument approach procedure.
17 December 2007	-	A Beechcraft Model 99 (registered N206AV) that was operating as Flight 4844 landed short of the runway at Vernal Regional Airport in low-visibility conditions, during which the aircraft was considerably damaged.
22 September 2009	-	An Ameriflight Fairchild Merlin IV-C sustained substantial damage to its nose and forward pressure bulkhead at Eppley Airfield, when another company's Cessna 402 collided with the parked plane. This accident was not charged to Ameriflight, since their airplane was parked unattended at the time.
4 November 2009	-	A Beechcraft Model 99 (registered N330AV) suffered a bird strike when approaching Show Low Regional Airport following a cargo flight from Phoenix Sky Harbor International Airport. A western grebe impacted and penetrated the left pilot side of the flight-deck windscreen, striking and injuring the single pilot. The impact left an 11- by 8-inch hole in the windshield. The pilot was able to continue the approach and land without further incident.
6 January 2010	-	A Beechcraft Model 99 (registered N206AV) was damaged in a hard landing at Kearney Regional Airport following a cargo flight from Omaha. The aircraft may have behaved unexpectedly because of unconfirmed icing that may have been present on the wings.
10 March 2011	AMF1951	A Fairchild Swearingen Metroliner, slid off the runway and onto the grass at Boeing Field in Seattle when completing a flight from Nez Perce County Airport. Preliminary reports indicated a nosewheel steering problem, but difficult wind shear conditions also were occurring at the time of the accident. The single pilot of the airplane was uninjured.
30 June 2015	-	A Beechcraft Model 99 (Flight 1802) crashed immediately after takeoff on Salt Lake City International Airport's Runway 16L just before 8:00 am local time. Both pilots were reported uninjured. The flight was bound for Ely, Nevada.
6 February 2018	-	A Fairchild Swearingen Metroliner experienced a runway excursion at the San Luis Obispo County Regional Airport. No injuries were reported, with only minor delays to commercial flights.
15 November 2022	AMF7141	A Fairchild SA227-AT Expediter with 2 crew members, 1 passenger and 56 dogs on board (registered N247DH) made a belly landing on Western Lakes Golf Club, 6 km short of runway 10 at Waukesha County Airport. Everyone on board survived with the 3 people suffering minor injuries and the 56 dogs receiving only bumps and scratches.
7 October 2024	AMF1685	A Beechcraft Model 99 crashed shortly after takeoff from Norfolk Regional Airport, Nebraska killing the sole pilot on board. The aircraft was headed to Omaha Airport.
