= List of airports in Oregon =

This is a list of airports in Oregon (a U.S. state), grouped by type and sorted by location. It contains all public-use and military airports in the state. Some former airports may be included where notable.

For private-use airports, see the list of private-use airports in Oregon.

== Airports ==
This list contains the following information:

- **City served** – The city generally associated with the airport, as per the airport's master record with the Federal Aviation Administration. This is not always the actual location since some airports are located in smaller towns outside of the city they serve. It is not meant to be a complete list of cities served, which can be found in or added to each airport's Wikipedia article.
- **FAA** – The location identifier assigned by the Federal Aviation Administration (FAA). These are linked to each airport's page at the .
- **IATA** – The airport code assigned by the International Air Transport Association (IATA). Those that do not match the FAA code are shown in bold.
- **ICAO** – The location indicator assigned by the International Civil Aviation Organization (ICAO).
- **Airport name** – The official airport name. Those shown in **bold** indicate the airport has scheduled passenger service on commercial airlines.
- **Role** – One of four FAA airport categories, as per the 2025-2029 National Plan of Integrated Airport Systems (NPIAS) report released October 2024:
  - P-s: Commercial service – primary are publicly owned airports that receive scheduled passenger service and have more than 10,000 passenger boardings (enplanements) each year. Each primary airport is sub-classified by the FAA as one of the following four "hub" types (s):
    - L: Large hub that accounts for at least 1% of total U.S. passenger enplanements.
    - M: Medium hub that accounts for between 0.25% and 1% of total U.S. passenger enplanements.
    - S: Small hub that accounts for between 0.05% and 0.25% of total U.S. passenger enplanements.
    - N: Nonhub that accounts for less than 0.05% of total U.S. passenger enplanements, but more than 10,000 annual enplanements.
  - CS: Commercial service – nonprimary are publicly owned airports that receive scheduled passenger service and have at least 2,500 passenger boardings each year.
  - R: Reliever airports are designated by the FAA to relieve congestion at a large commercial service airport and to provide more general aviation access to the overall community.
  - GA: General aviation airports are the largest single group of airports in the U.S. airport system. They are public-use airports that do not have scheduled service or have scheduled service with less than 2,500 passenger boardings each year.
- **Enplanements** – The number of enplanements (commercial passenger boardings) that occurred at the airport in calendar year 2024, as per FAA records released October 2025.

City served	FAA	IATA	ICAO	Airport name	Role	Enplanements (2024)
				**Commercial service – primary airports**		
Eugene	EUG	EUG	KEUG	**Mahlon Sweet Field**	P-S	824,952
Medford	MFR	MFR	KMFR	**Rogue Valley International–Medford Airport**	P-S	503,733
North Bend	OTH	OTH	KOTH	**Southwest Oregon Regional Airport** (was North Bend Municipal)	P-N	20,945
Portland	PDX	PDX	KPDX	**Portland International Airport**	P-M	8,639,088
Redmond	RDM	RDM	KRDM	**Roberts Field**	P-S	601,152
				**Commercial service – nonprimary airports**		
Pendleton	PDT	PDT	KPDT	**Eastern Oregon Regional Airport at Pendleton**	CS	6,579
				**Reliever airports**		
Portland / Hillsboro	HIO	HIO	KHIO	Portland–Hillsboro Airport	R	52
Portland / Troutdale	TTD	TTD	KTTD	Portland–Troutdale Airport	R	11
				**General aviation airports**		
Albany	S12			Albany Municipal Airport	GA	0
Ashland	S03			Ashland Municipal Airport (Sumner Parker Field)	GA	0
Astoria	AST	AST	KAST	Astoria Regional Airport	GA	14
Aurora	UAO		KUAO	Aurora State Airport (Wes Lematta Field)	GA	3
Baker City	BKE	BKE	KBKE	Baker City Municipal Airport	GA	0
Bandon	S05	BDY		Bandon State Airport	GA	34
Bend	BDN		KBDN	Bend Municipal Airport	GA	70
Boardman	M50			Boardman Airport	GA	0
Brookings	BOK	BOK	KBOK	Brookings Airport	GA	0
Burns	BNO	BNO	KBNO	Burns Municipal Airport	GA	0
Cave Junction	3S4			Illinois Valley Airport	GA	0
Chiloquin	2S7	CHZ		Chiloquin State Airport	GA	0
Christmas Valley	62S			Christmas Valley Airport	GA	0
Condon	3S9			Condon State Airport (Pauling Field)	GA	6
Corvallis	CVO	CVO	KCVO	Corvallis Municipal Airport	GA	1
Cottage Grove	61S			Cottage Grove State Airport (Jim Wright Field)	GA	0
Creswell	77S			Hobby Field	GA	0
Florence	6S2			Florence Municipal Airport	GA	0
Gleneden Beach	S45			Siletz Bay State Airport	GA	0
Gold Beach	4S1	GOL		Gold Beach Municipal Airport	GA	0
Grants Pass	3S8			Grants Pass Airport	GA	4
Hermiston	HRI	HES	KHRI	Hermiston Municipal Airport	GA	0
Hood River	4S2			Ken Jernstedt Airfield	GA	0
Independence	7S5			Independence State Airport	GA	0
John Day	GCD	JDA	KGCD	Grant County Regional Airport (Ogilvie Field)	GA	0
Joseph	JSY		KJSY	Joseph State Airport	GA	0
Klamath Falls	LMT	LMT	KLMT	Crater Lake–Klamath Regional Airport (Kingsley Field)	GA	35
La Grande	LGD	LGD	KLGD	La Grande/Union County Airport	GA	0
Lakeview	LKV	LKV	KLKV	Lake County Airport	GA	0
Lebanon	S30			Lebanon State Airport	GA	0
Lexington	9S9			Lexington Airport	GA	0
Madras	S33	MDJ		Madras Municipal Airport (was City–County Airport)	GA	0
McDermitt	26U			McDermitt State Airport	GA	0
McMinnville	MMV		KMMV	McMinnville Municipal Airport	GA	0
Myrtle Creek	16S			Myrtle Creek Municipal Airport	GA	0
Newport	ONP	ONP	KONP	Newport Municipal Airport	GA	6
Ontario	ONO	ONO	KONO	Ontario Municipal Airport	GA	4
Portland / Mulino	4S9			Mulino State Airport (was Portland–Mulino Airport)	GA	0
Portland	61J			Portland Downtown Heliport	GA	0
Prineville	S39	PRZ		Prineville Airport	GA	0
Roseburg	RBG	RBG	KRBG	Roseburg Regional Airport (Marion E. Carl Memorial Field)	GA	0
Salem	SLE	SLE	KSLE	**McNary Field**	GA	28,119
Scappoose	SPB		KSPB	Scappoose Industrial Airpark	GA	0
Seaside	56S			Seaside Municipal Airport	GA	0
The Dalles (Note: Although FAA Form 5010 sources associate The Dalles Airport with Oregon, it is physically located in Dallesport, Washington. Its association with Oregon is strengthened by its ownership (partially by the City of The Dalles) and by the fact that its primary market served is in Oregon.)	DLS	DLS	KDLS	Columbia Gorge Regional/The Dalles Municipal Airport	GA	8
Tillamook	TMK		KTMK	Tillamook Airport	GA	0
Wasco	35S			Wasco State Airport	GA	0
				**Other public-use airports** (not listed in NPIAS)		
Alkali Lake	R03			Alkali Lake State Airport		
Arlington	1S8			Arlington Municipal Airport		
Beaver Marsh	2S2			Beaver Marsh Airport (Beaver Marsh State Airport)		
Cascade Locks	CZK	CZK	KCZK	Cascade Locks State Airport		
Clearwater	3S6			Toketee State Airport		
Cornelius	4S4			Skyport Airport		
Crescent Lake	5S2			Crescent Lake State Airport		
Culver	5S5			Lake Billy Chinook State Airport		
Denmark	5S6			Cape Blanco State Airport		
Enterprise	8S4			Enterprise Municipal Airport		
Estacada	5S9			Valley View Airport		
Florence	1O0			Lake Woahink Seaplane Base		
Gates	6S4			Davis Airport		
Hillsboro	7S3			Stark's Twin Oaks Airpark		0
Hubbard	7S9			Lenhardt Airpark		
Imnaha	25U			Memaloose Airport		
Lakeside	9S3			Lakeside Municipal Airport		
Malin	4S7			Malin Airport		
Manzanita	3S7			Nehalem Bay State Airport		
McKenzie Bridge	00S			McKenzie Bridge State Airport		
Monument	12S			Monument Municipal Airport		
Newberg	17S			Chehalem Airpark		
Newberg	2S6			Sportsman Airpark		
Oakridge	5S0			Oakridge State Airport		
Owyhee	28U			Owyhee Reservoir State Airport		
Pacific City	PFC	PFC	KPFC	Pacific City State Airport		
Paisley	22S			Paisley Airport		
Pinehurst	24S			Pinehurst State Airport		
Powers	6S6			Powers Airport		
Prospect	64S			Prospect State Airport		
Rome	REO	REO	KREO	Rome State Airport		
Roseburg	5S1			George Felt Airport		
Sandy	S48			Country Squire Airpark		
Sandy	03S			Sandy River Airport		
Santiam Junction	8S3			Santiam Junction State Airport		
Silver Lake	45S			Silver Lake Forest Service Strip		
Sisters	6K5			Sisters Eagle Air Airport		
Sunriver	S21	SUO		Sunriver Airport		36
Toledo	5S4			Toledo State Airport		
Vale	S49			Miller Memorial Airpark		0
Vernonia	05S			Vernonia Municipal Airport		
Waldport	R33			Wakonda Beach State Airport		
				**Other government/military airports**		
Astoria				CGAS Astoria		
North Bend				CGAS North Bend		
Salem	4OR1			McNary ARNG Field Heliport		
Warrenton	15OR			Camp Rilea Heliport		
				**Notable former airports**		
Astoria				Naval Air Station Tongue Point (closed)		
Beaverton				Bernard's Airport (closed 1969)		
Eugene				Willamette Airpark (T-Bird Airport) (closed) open c. 1946–c. 1967		
Florence	~~5J2~~			Siltcoos Lake Seaplane Base (closed?)		
Oregon City	~~OS2~~			Oregon City Airpark (closed 1993–1998)		
Portland				Jantzen Beach Seaplane Base (closed 1981)		
Portland				Swan Island Airport (Portland Municipal) (closed) open 1926–1946		
Springfield				Springfield Airport (closed)		
Sutherlin	~~3S3~~			Sutherlin Airport (closed 1991)		
Umatilla				Umatilla Army Airfield (closed)		

Footnotes:

== See also ==
- Essential Air Service
- Oregon World War II Army Airfields
- Wikipedia:WikiProject Aviation/Airline destination lists: North America#Oregon
