= Portland Airport =

Portland Airport may refer to:

== Australia ==
- Portland Airport (Victoria) in Portland, Victoria, Australia (IATA: PTJ)

== United States ==
- Portland International Airport in Portland, Oregon (FAA: PDX)
- Portland International Jetport in Portland, Maine (FAA: PWM)
- Portland Municipal Airport (Indiana) in Portland, Indiana (FAA: PLD)
- Portland Municipal Airport (Tennessee) in Portland, Tennessee (FAA: 1M5)

== See also ==
- Hillsboro Airport, or Portland-Hillsboro Airport, in Hillsboro, Oregon, United States (FAA: HIO)
- Portland–Troutdale Airport in Troutdale, Oregon, United States (FAA: TTD)
- Mulino State Airport, formerly Portland-Mulino Airport, in Mulino, Oregon, United States (FAA: 4S9)
- Portland Downtown Heliport in Portland, Oregon, United States (FAA: 61J)
- Hunt Airport in Portland, Texas, United States (FAA: 9R5)
- Portland (disambiguation)
