= 2S7 =

2S7 can refer to:

- 2S7 Pion, a Soviet/Russian self-propelled gun
- 2S7, the FAA location identifier for Chiloquin State Airport
