= Enterprise Municipal Airport =

Enterprise Municipal Airport may refer to:

- Enterprise Municipal Airport (Alabama) in Enterprise, Alabama, United States (FAA: EDN, IATA: ETS)
- Enterprise Municipal Airport (Oregon) in Enterprise, Oregon, United States (FAA: 8S4)
