= CHZ =

CHZ may refer to:

- CHZ, IATA code for Chiloquin State Airport in Klamath County, Oregon, US
- Circumstellar habitable zone, the range of orbits around a star where a planet with liquid water is possible
- Centipede Hz (2012), album by Animal Collective
- Čiernohronská železnica (Čierny Hron Railway), a heritage railroad in Slovakia
