= BDY =

BDY or bdy may refer to:

- Bandon State Airport, Oregon, United States (IATA:BDY)
- Bredbury railway station, England (GBR:BDY)
- Broadway station (LIRR), New York, United States
- Yugambeh–Bundjalung languages, spoken in Australia (ISO 639-3:bdy)
