= Cape Blanco State Airport =

Airport in Oregon, United States

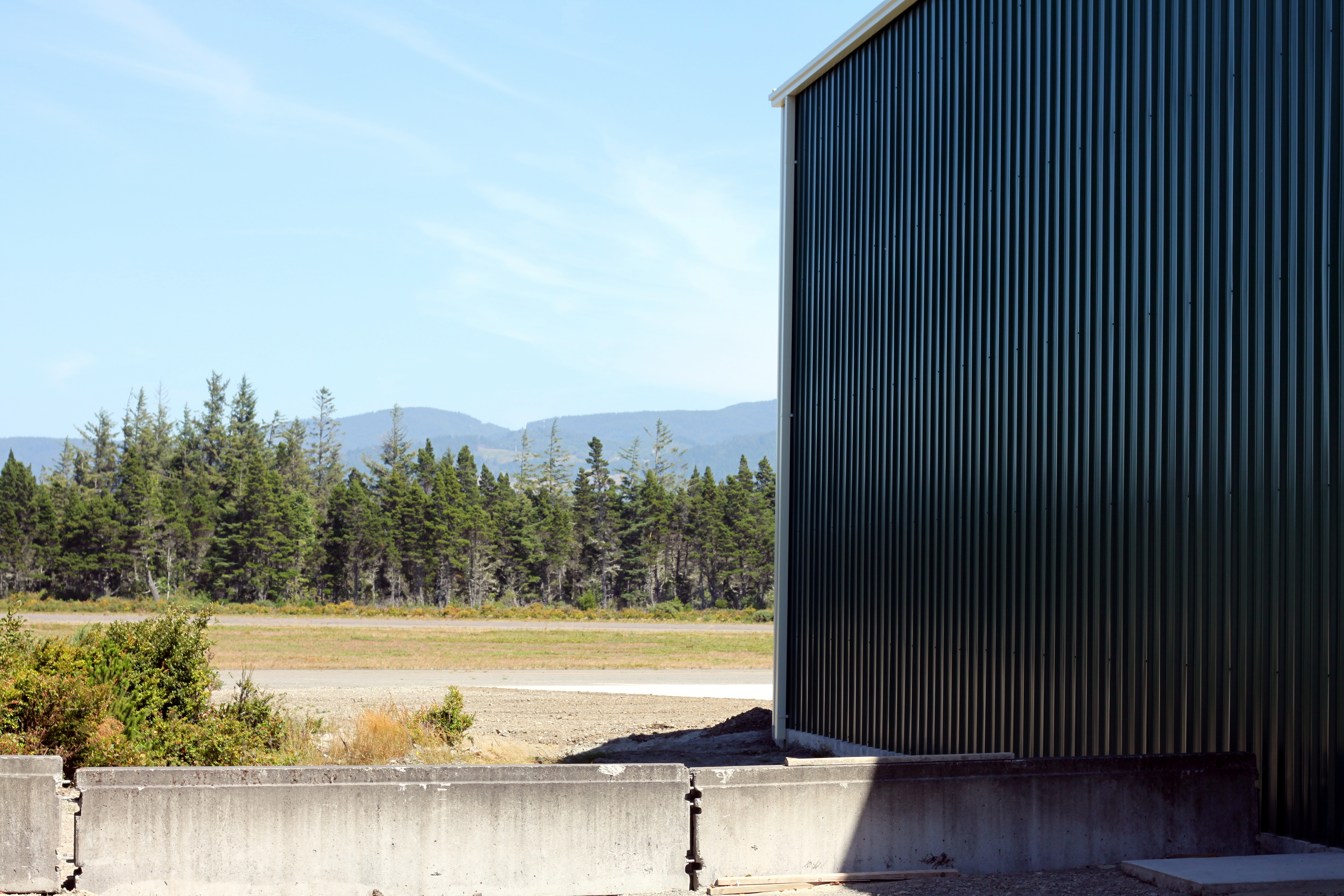
- IATA: none; ICAO: - FAA: 5S6

Summary
- Airport type: Public
- Operator: Oregon Department of Aviation
- Location: Denmark, Oregon
- Elevation AMSL: 214 ft / 65.2 m
- Coordinates: 42°51′28.3900″N 124°31′03.39″W
- Interactive map of Cape Blanco State Airport

Runways
Direction	Length		Surface
Direction	ft	m	Surface
14/32	5,100	1,554	Asphalt

Cape Blanco State Airport (FAA LID: 5S6) is a public airport located four miles (6.4 km) southwest of Denmark, Oregon, United States.

The airport was constructed during World War II between 1944 and 1945, and was originally leased to the US Navy. Previous owners include Curry County and the Oregon State Highway Department.

== See also ==
- Cape Blanco, Oregon
