= Mulino, Oregon =

Unincorporated community in the state of Oregon, United States

- Hamlet and census-designated place
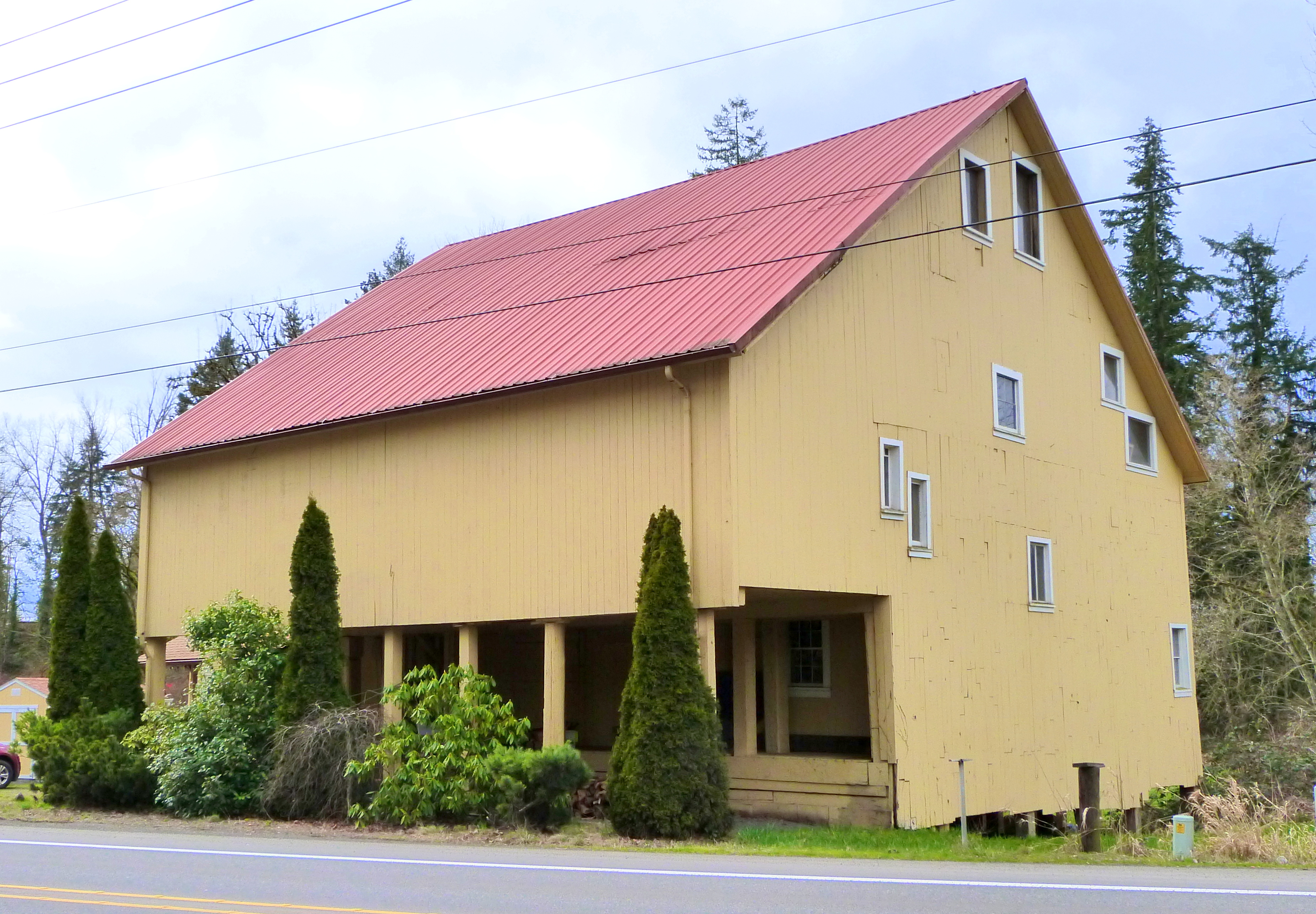
- Howard's Gristmill in Mulino

- Location within the state of Oregon Mulino (the United States)
- Coordinates: 45°13′25″N 122°33′40″W
- Country: United States
- State: Oregon
- County: Clackamas

Area
  - Total: 13.81 sq mi (35.76 km^{2})
  - Land: 13.78 sq mi (35.68 km^{2})
  - Water: 0.035 sq mi (0.09 km^{2})
- Elevation: 240 ft (73 m)

Population (2020)
  - Total: 2,250
  - Density: 163.3/sq mi (63.06/km^{2})
- Time zone: UTC−08:00 (Pacific (PST))
  - Summer (DST): UTC−07:00 (PDT)
- ZIP Code: 97042
- FIPS code: 41-50450
- GNIS feature ID: 2584419
- Website: www.hamletofmulino.us//

Mulino, Oregon is a hamlet and census-designated place (CDP) located in Clackamas County, Oregon, United States, on Oregon Route 213 between the cities of Oregon City and Molalla. As of the 2020 census, Mulino had a population of 2,250.

== History ==
The community was named after a flour mill erected there in 1851, when the community was known as "Howards Mill." "Mulino" is a corruption of the Spanish word molino, or mill, and was chosen for the name when postal authorities objected that "Molino" was easily confused with nearby Molalla. The Mulino post office was established in 1882.

As of 2007, the mill building, remodeled into a private residence, still stands. According to a plaque given by the National Register of Historic Places, it is the oldest industrial building to remain standing in Oregon and the oldest building to serve continuously as the local post office. The mill, listed as Howard's Gristmill, was added to the National Register of Historic Places in 1981.

== Local government ==
In May 2007, Mulino residents voted to become a hamlet, the third such community in Oregon, and the community was granted official hamlet status by the county on June 7, 2007.

== Points of interest ==
Mulino is home to the Mulino State Airport, a general aviation facility owned and operated by the Oregon Department of Aviation.

== Climate ==
This region experiences warm (but not hot) and dry summers, with no average monthly temperatures above 71.6 °F. According to the Köppen Climate Classification system, Mulino has a warm-summer Mediterranean climate, abbreviated "Csb" on climate maps.

== Demographics ==
Historical population
Census	Pop.	Note	%±
2020	2,250		—
U.S. Decennial Census

== Notable people ==
- Tootie Smith, former state representative
