= Owyhee Reservoir State Airport =

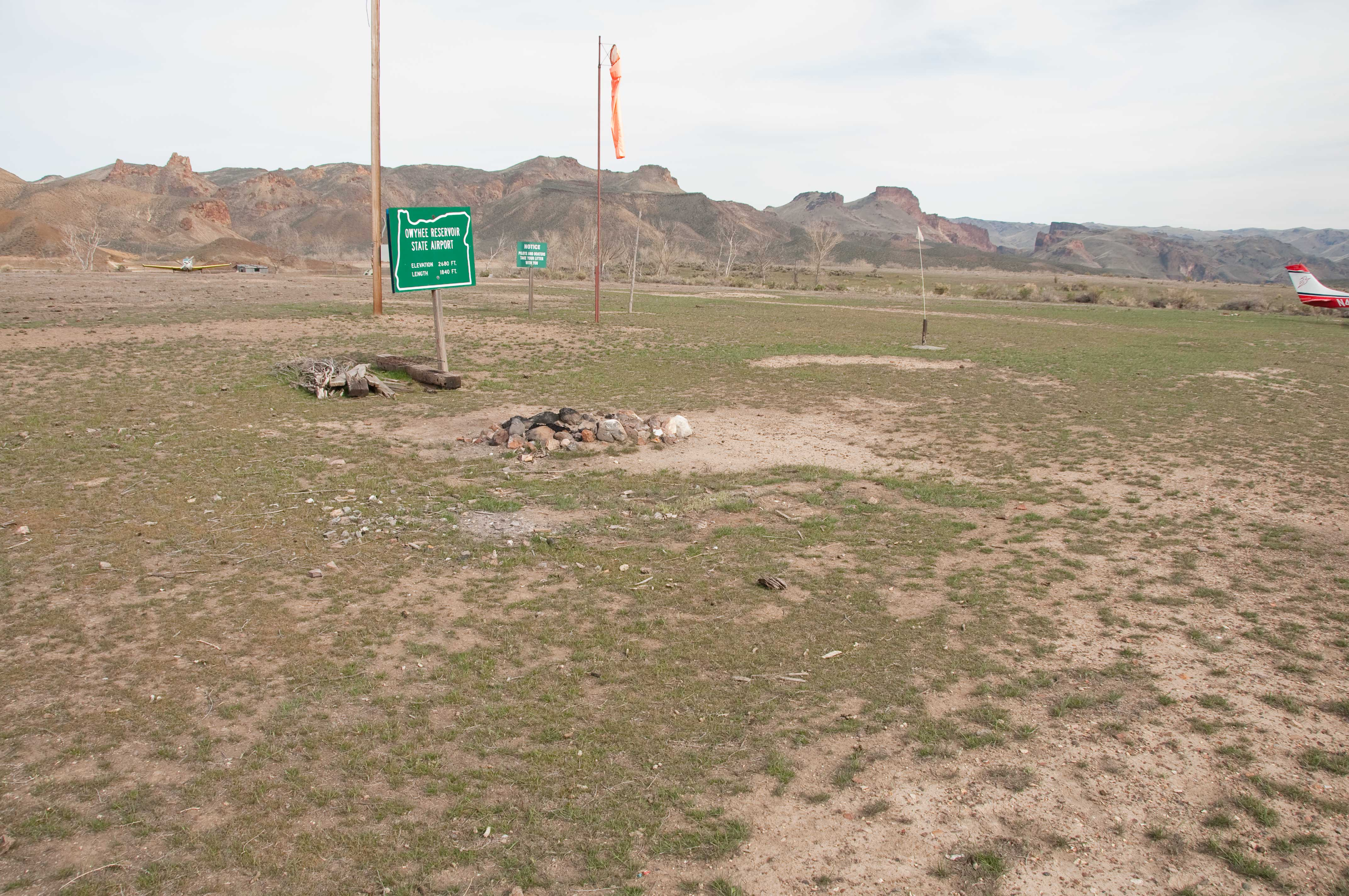
- IATA: none; ICAO: none; FAA LID: 28U

Summary
- Airport type: Public
- Operator: Oregon Department of Aviation
- Location: Owyhee, Oregon
- Elevation AMSL: 2,680 ft / 817 m
- Coordinates: 43°25′29.5730″N 117°20′43.58″W
- Interactive map of Owyhee Reservoir State Airport

Runways
Direction	Length		Surface
Direction	ft	m	Surface
13/31	1,840	561	Dirt

Owyhee Reservoir State Airport (FAA LID: 28U) is a public airport located 25 miles (40 km) southwest of Owyhee, in Malheur County, Oregon, United States.

== See also ==
- Owyhee Reservoir
