= Jantzen Beach Seaplane Base =

- IATA: none; ICAO: none

Summary
- Owner/Operator: Jantzen Beach; Amusement Park
- Location: Hayden Island, Portland, Oregon
- Opened: 1946
- Closed: 1981

Runways
Direction	Length		Surface
Direction	ft	m	Surface
	5,280	1,609	Water
	3,000	914	Gravel

Jantzen Beach Seaplane Base was a private seaplane base and airport located on Hayden Island in Portland, Oregon, United States. It featured a mile long landing area on the Columbia River and a 3,000 foot by 300 foot gravel runway. The park was owned and operated by the Jantzen Beach Amusement Park. When the park was converted into the Jantzen Beach SuperCenter the seaplane base and airport were removed.

== History ==
C. R. Zehtbaur, vice-president of the Jantzen Beach Amusement Park, announced in 1946 that his business had entered a long-term lease for a one-mile strip along the Columbia River. The park graded a 3,000 by 300 foot runway and built hangars, a ramp, a salesroom and a clubhouse. The cost of the seaport was estimated at US$500,000 (US$8,255,119 adjusted for inflation). Gary Safley, who was a retired United States Naval Aviator, joined the seaport staff as the clubhouse flight instructor. The runway complied with the Civil Aeronautics Authority's class two guidelines. Western Skyways began offering flight instruction at the seaplane base in 1947.

In 1963, the Oregon Department of Aviation unanimously denied a proposal to expand the seaplane base into a combined airport on a man-made island on the Columbia River. The Federal Aviation Administration (FAA), Air Transport Association of America, Port of Portland and Portland General Electric objected to the proposal, citing safety as the concern.
