= Toketee State Airport =

- IATA: none; ICAO: none; FAA LID: 3S6

Summary
- Airport type: Public
- Operator: Oregon Department of Aviation
- Location: Clearwater, Oregon
- Elevation AMSL: 3,361 ft / 1,024 m
- Coordinates: 43°13′24.4400″N 122°25′15.15″W
- Interactive map of Toketee State Airport

Runways
Direction	Length		Surface
Direction	ft	m	Surface
11/29	5,350	1,631	Dirt

Toketee State Airport (FAA LID: 3S6) is a public airport located two miles (3.2 km) south of Clearwater in Douglas County, Oregon, United States. It is closed between November 1 and May 1, and pilots are advised that elk and deer can sometimes be found on the runway.
