= Howard's Gristmill =

Coordinates: 45.2247°N 122.582°W

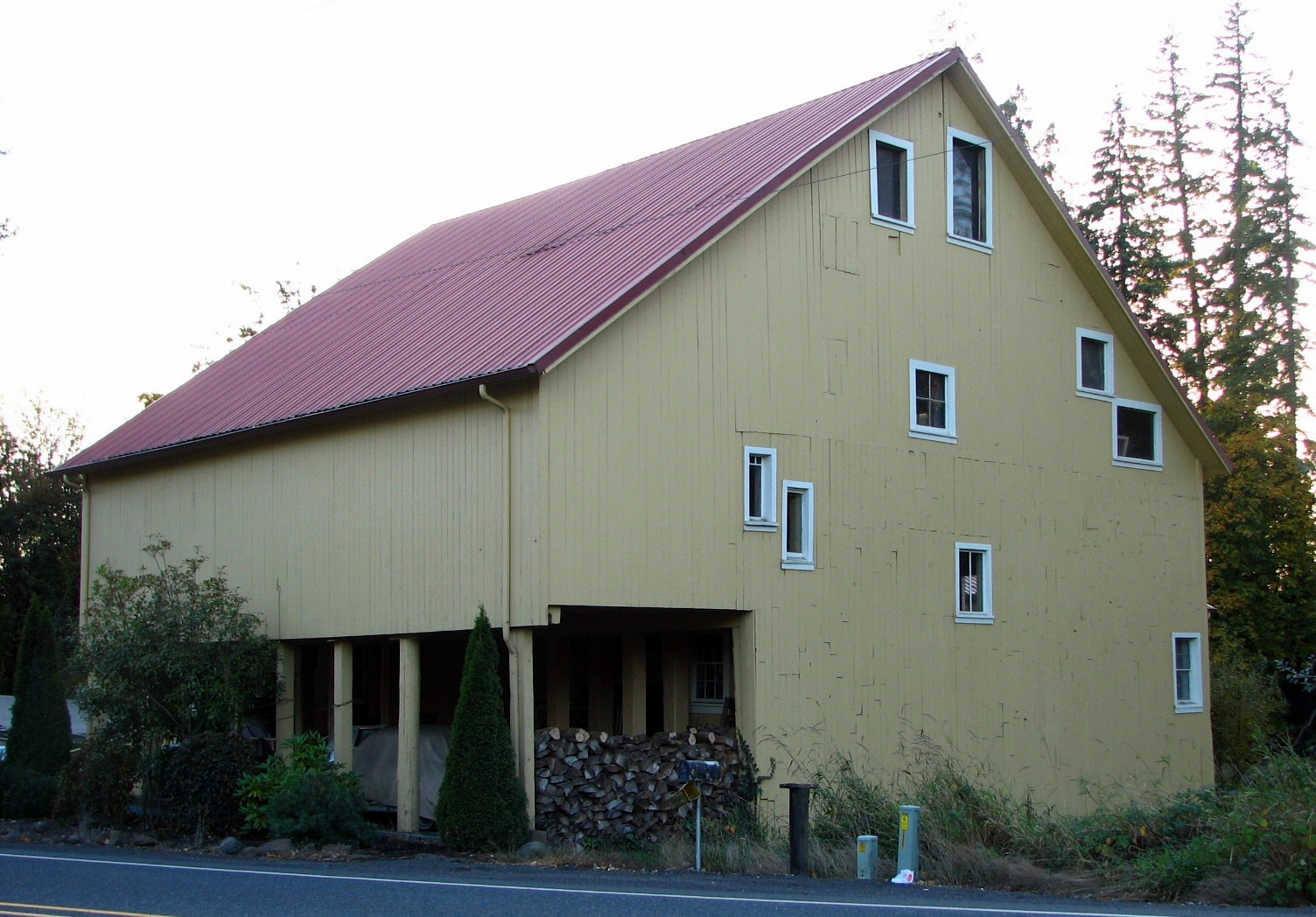
The building's exterior, 2008

Howard's Gristmill is a historic building in Mulino, Oregon, United States. It is listed on the National Register of Historic Places.

== See also ==
- National Register of Historic Places listings in Clackamas County, Oregon
