= Owyhee Reservoir =

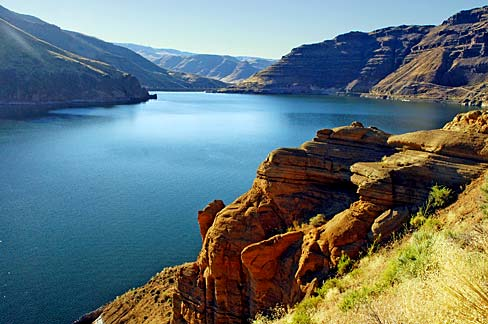

- Location within Oregon Location within the United States
- Location: Malheur County, Oregon
- Coordinates: 43°27′41″N 117°20′18″W
- Type: reservoir
- Primary inflows: Owyhee River
- Primary outflows: Owyhee River
- Catchment area: 11,160 mi^{2} (28,900 km^{2})
- Basin countries: United States
- First flooded: 1932
- Max. length: 52 mi (84 km)
- Surface area: 13,900 acres (5,600 ha)
- Average depth: 81 ft (25 m)
- Max. depth: 117 ft (36 m)
- Water volume: 1,122,000 acre⋅ft (1,384,000 dam^{3})
- Residence time: 1.7 years
- Shore length^{1}: 125 mi (201 km)
- Surface elevation: 2,670 ft (810 m)
- Website: www.usbr.gov/pn/hydromet/ramps/owyhee/owyhee.html
- ^{1} Shore length is not a well-defined measure.

Owyhee Reservoir or Owyhee Lake is a reservoir on the Owyhee River in Malheur County, Oregon, United States. Located in far Eastern Oregon near the Idaho border, the reservoir is Oregon's longest at 52 miles (84 km). The 13,900-acre (56 km^{2}) lake is home to several species of fish, including crappie, rainbow trout, largemouth bass, smallmouth bass, yellow perch, and brown bullhead. An artificial lake, it was created in 1932 with the completion of the Owyhee Dam. The lake supplies water for irrigation for 1,800 farms covering 118,000 acres of land in Eastern Oregon and Southwestern Idaho. Seasonal Lake Owyhee State Park is located on the northeast shore and includes a boat ramp.

== See also ==
- Owyhee Reservoir State Airport
- List of lakes in Oregon
