= Seaside Municipal Airport =

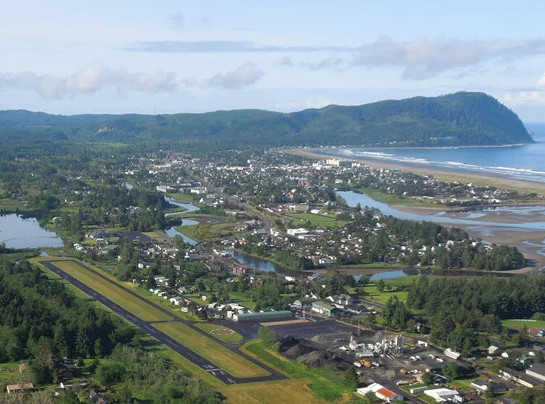
- Seaside Municipal Airport and Tillamook Head, Seaside Oregon
- IATA: none; ICAO: none; FAA LID: 56S

Summary
- Airport type: Public
- Owner: City of Seaside
- Operator: City of Seaside
- Serves: Seaside, Oregon
- Location: Seaside, Oregon
- Elevation AMSL: 12 ft / 4 m
- Coordinates: 46°00′53.9850″N 123°54′27.57″W

Map
- Location of airport in Oregon

Runways
Direction	Length		Surface
Direction	ft	m	Surface
16/34	2,211	674	Asphalt

Statistics (2011)
- Aircraft operations: 2,600
- Based aircraft: 5
- Source: Federal Aviation Administration

Seaside Municipal Airport (FAA LID: 56S) is a general aviation airport located one mile (1.6 km) Northeast of Seaside in Clatsop County, Oregon, United States. It is owned and operated as a public airport by the city of Seaside. The airport has one asphalt runway, a parallel taxiway, a parking apron with space for up to 20 aircraft, and a five-bay hangar building. Seaside Municipal is the closest airport to Seaside (downtown 3 miles), Gearhart (downtown 1 mile), and Cannon Beach (10 miles).

== History ==
The airport property was originally owned by Don Inman, who maintained and operated the grass airstrip known as Seaside-Gearhart airport from 1946 through the 1950s. By 1960, the post-World War II general aviation boom was well under way, and state and federal governments were financing small airport development under the FAA's Airport Improvement Program. Members of the community convinced the State of Oregon to purchase the airport and install a paved runway, taxiways and parking ramp. The Oregon Department of Aviation operated the airport as Seaside State Airport until 1990, at which time it was chosen as one of several airports targeted for divestiture by the state, and subsequently deeded to the city of Seaside.

The airport remained essentially unchanged until 2003, when the city appointed a new airport advisory committee, and with the committee's guidance, applied for the first of several new federal Airport Improvement Program, Connect Oregon, and Oregon Department of Aviation grants to upgrade the runway, taxiways, navigational aids, drainage system, and lighting. In 2007, the first hangars were built. The five-bay hangar building is on airport land, leased from the city of Seaside, and the bays are individually owned.

== Operations ==
There is no scheduled air service, but charters and air taxi operators often fly passengers in. The airport is also used by local and transient flyers, mostly private pilots flying small (1-6 seat) general aviation aircraft visiting the area for a day or a weekend. Other operations include training flights from Astoria and the surrounding region, Life Flight, US Coast Guard, and Air National Guard operations. Flightseeing operators have operated out of the airport at various times during its existence. Several private aircraft are typically based on the field full-time.
