= Beaver Marsh, Oregon =

Unincorporated community in the state of Oregon, United States

Coordinates: 43.134019°N 121.803079°W

Beaver Marsh is an unincorporated community in Klamath County, Oregon, United States. It is located on U.S. Route 97, about 6 miles south of Chemult. The Southern Pacific Cascade Line passes near the locale. As of the 2020 census, Beaver Marsh had a population of 52.

Beaver Marsh was an important stagecoach stop on the Oregon Central Military Wagon Road. Beaver Marsh post office opened in 1927 and closed in 1928. The community is near the swamp of the same name.

== Climate ==
This region experiences warm (but not hot) and dry summers, with no average monthly temperatures above 71.6 °F. According to the Köppen Climate Classification system, Beaver Marsh has a warm-summer Mediterranean climate, abbreviated "Csb" on climate maps.

== Education ==
It is within the Klamath County School District.

== See also ==
- Beaver Marsh Airport
