= Pacific City State Airport =

Airport in Oregon, United States

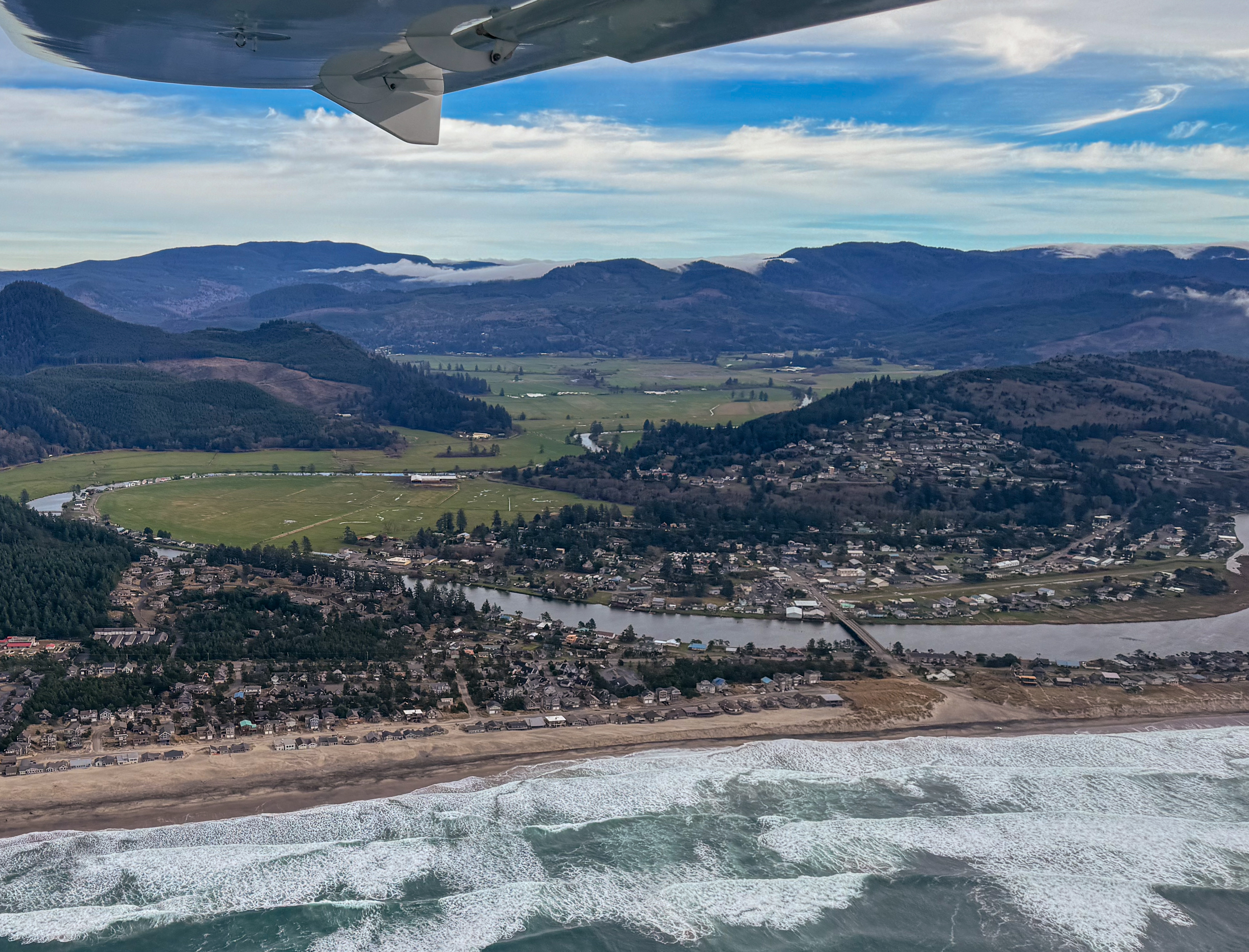
- Airport at south end of city
- IATA: PFC; ICAO: KPFC; FAA LID: PFC

Summary
- Airport type: Public
- Owner: Oregon Dept. of Aviation
- Serves: Pacific City, Oregon
- Elevation AMSL: 5 ft (1.5 m)
- Coordinates: 45°11′59″N 123°57′44″W

Map
- Location of airport in Oregon

Runways
Direction	Length		Surface
Direction	ft	m	Surface
14/32	1,860	567	Asphalt

Statistics (2011)
- Aircraft operations: 2,000
- Based aircraft: 5
- Source: Federal Aviation Administration

Pacific City State Airport (IATA: PFC, ICAO: KPFC, FAA LID: PFC) is a public use airport located one nautical mile (2 km) south of the central business district of Pacific City, in Tillamook County, Oregon, United States. It is owned by the Oregon Department of Aviation.

== Facilities and aircraft ==
Pacific City State Airport covers an area of 15 acres (6 ha) at an elevation of 5 feet (2 m) above mean sea level. It has one runway designated 14/32 with an asphalt surface measuring 1,860 by 30 feet (566.9 m × 9.1 m), with a 300 feet (91 m) displaced threshold on 14, leaving 1,560 feet (480 m) for landing.

For the 12-month period ending November 4, 2011, the airport had 2,000 aircraft operations, an average of 166 per month: 96% general aviation and 4% air taxi. At that time there were five aircraft based at this airport, all single-engine.
