= Enterprise Municipal Airport (Oregon) =

Airport in Oregon, United States

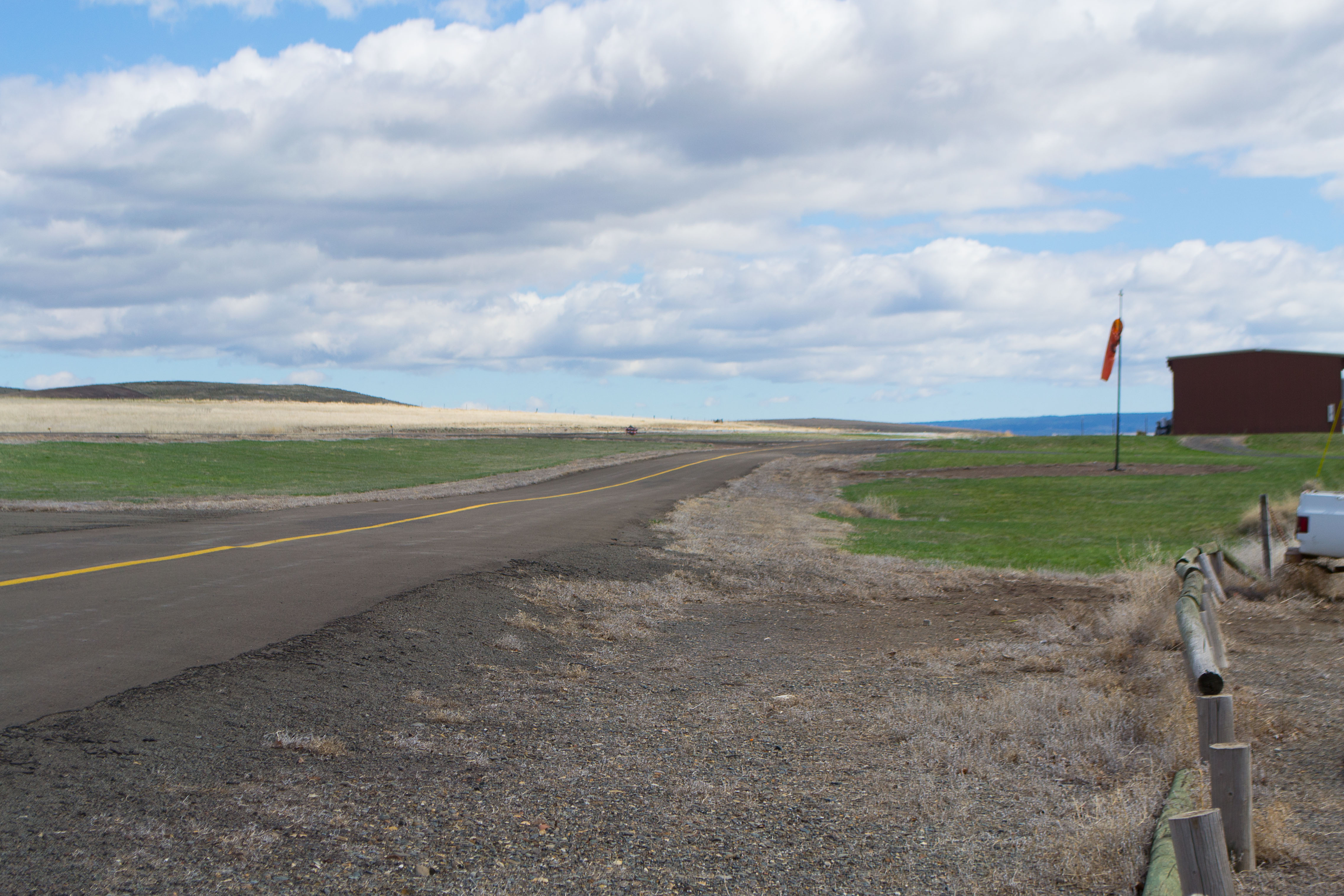
- IATA: none; ICAO: none; FAA LID: 8S4

Summary
- Airport type: Public
- Owner: City of Enterprise
- Serves: Enterprise, Oregon
- Elevation AMSL: 3,957 ft (1,206 m)
- Coordinates: 45°25′30″N 117°15′54″W
- Website: EnterpriseOregon.org/...

Map
- Location of airport in Oregon

Runways
Direction	Length		Surface
Direction	ft	m	Surface
12/30	2,850	869	Asphalt

Statistics (2018)
- Aircraft operations (year ending 8/28/2018): 4,850
- Based aircraft: 31
- Sources: FAA and City of Enterprise

Enterprise Municipal Airport (FAA LID: 8S4) is a city-owned, public-use airport located in Enterprise, a city in Wallowa County, Oregon, United States.

== Facilities and aircraft ==
Enterprise Municipal Airport covers an area of 10 acres (4 ha) at an elevation of 3,957 feet (1,206 m) above mean sea level. It has one runway designated 12/30 with an asphalt surface measuring 2,850 by 50 feet (869 x 15 m).

For the 12-month period ending August 28, 2018, the airport had 4,850 aircraft operations, an average of 93 per week: 91% general aviation and 9% air taxi. At that time there were 31 aircraft based at this airport: 27 single-engine and 4 ultralight.

== See also ==
- List of airports in Oregon
