= Beaver Marsh Airport =

Beaver Marsh Airport Beaver Marsh State Airport
- IATA: none; ICAO: none; FAA LID: 2S2

Summary
- Airport type: Public use
- Owner: Gregory Kackstetter and Paul Ehrhardt
- Serves: Beaver Marsh, Oregon
- Elevation AMSL: 4,638 ft (1,414 m)
- Coordinates: 43°07′39″N 121°48′31″W

Map
- Location of airport in Oregon

Runways
Direction	Length		Surface
Direction	ft	m	Surface
18/36	4,500	1,372	Dirt

Statistics (2011)
- Aircraft operations: 150
- Source: Federal Aviation Administration

Beaver Marsh Airport, also known as Beaver Marsh State Airport (FAA LID: 2S2), is a public use airport located one nautical mile (2 km) southwest of Beaver Marsh, in Klamath County, Oregon, United States. The airport was previously owned by the State of Oregon after acquiring the airport from Crown-Zellerbach in 1964.

== Facilities and aircraft ==
Beaver Marsh Airport covers an area of 59 acres (19 ha) at an elevation of 4,638 feet (1,414 m) above mean sea level. It has one runway designated 18/36 with a dirt surface measuring 4,500 by 100 feet. In 2020 the airport was expanded to 120 wide, clear of trees. The southern approach is now clear of timber for 1/2 mile. There is an outhouse at the north end. In 2020 a well was added for water suppression source for Wildland Firefighting. 2021 established a lit windsock on the beacon tower and helicopter blue lit pad. Solar landing strip lights are currently being installed.(2022)

Manager for access and questions of current conditions in Gary Mort 541-365-4489 or 541 365 4480.

For the 12-month period ending June 27, 2011, the airport had 150 general aviation aircraft operations, an average of 12 per month.
