= Pinehurst State Airport =

- IATA: none; ICAO: FAA: 24S

Summary
- Airport type: Public
- Operator: Oregon Department of Aviation
- Location: Pinehurst, Oregon
- Elevation AMSL: 3,638 ft / 1,109 m
- Coordinates: 42°06′36.7200″N 122°22′59.49″W
- Interactive map of Pinehurst State Airport

Runways
Direction	Length		Surface
Direction	ft	m	Surface
4/22	2,800	853	Asphalt

Pinehurst State Airport (FAA LID: 24S) is a public airport located 1 mile (1.6 km) southwest of Pinehurst, in Jackson County, Oregon, United States.
