= Santiam Junction State Airport =

- IATA: none; ICAO: none; FAA LID: 8S3

Summary
- Airport type: Public
- Operator: Oregon Department of Aviation
- Location: Santiam Junction, Oregon
- Elevation AMSL: 3,780 ft / 1,152 m
- Coordinates: 44°26′04.4000″N 121°56′32.20″W
- Interactive map of Santiam Junction State Airport

Runways
Direction	Length		Surface
Direction	ft	m	Surface
6/24	2,800	853	Gravel

Santiam Junction State Airport (ICAO: 8S3) is a public airport located adjacent to Santiam Junction in Linn County, Oregon, United States. Santiam Junction is the intersection of U.S. Route 20 and Oregon Route 22. The Oregon Department of Transportation has a maintenance facility located on the north side of the field.

The landing strip is used for emergency, recreational, and aerial firefighting. It is closed from the first snowfall until spring. The airport grounds permit fly-in camping.

== See also ==
- Santiam Pass
