= Lebanon State Airport =

- IATA: none; ICAO: none; FAA LID: S30

Summary
- Airport type: Public
- Operator: Oregon Department of Aviation
- Location: Lebanon, Oregon
- Elevation AMSL: 344 ft / 105 m
- Coordinates: 44°31′47.4420″N 122°55′46.32″W
- Interactive map of Lebanon State Airport

Runways
Direction	Length		Surface
Direction	ft	m	Surface
16/34	2,877	877	Asphalt

Lebanon State Airport (FAA LID: S30) is a public airport located one mile (1.6 km) west of Lebanon in Linn County, Oregon, United States.
