= Siletz Bay State Airport =

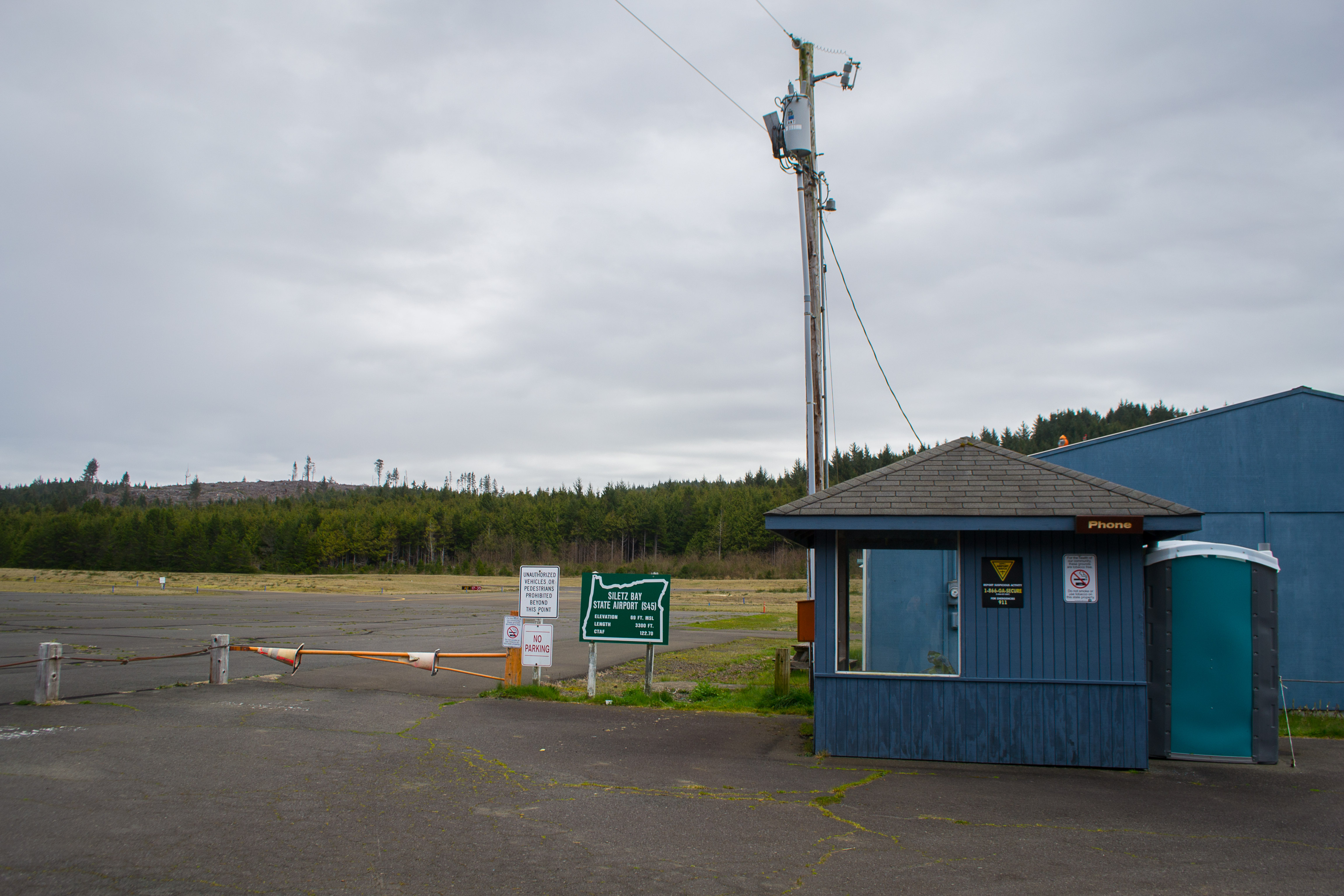
- IATA: none; ICAO: none; FAA LID: S45

Summary
- Airport type: Public
- Operator: Oregon Department of Aviation
- Location: Gleneden Beach, Oregon
- Elevation AMSL: 69 ft / 21 m
- Coordinates: 44°52′36.9200″N 124°01′42.67″W
- Interactive map of Siletz Bay State Airport

Runways
Direction	Length		Surface
Direction	ft	m	Surface
17/35	3,300	1,006	Asphalt

Siletz Bay State Airport (FAA LID: S45) is a public airport located one mile (1.6 km) southeast of Gleneden Beach in Lincoln County, Oregon, United States. The airfield is located to the south of its namesake Siletz Bay.
