= Condon State Airport =

Airport in Oregon, United States of America

Condon State Airport Pauling Field
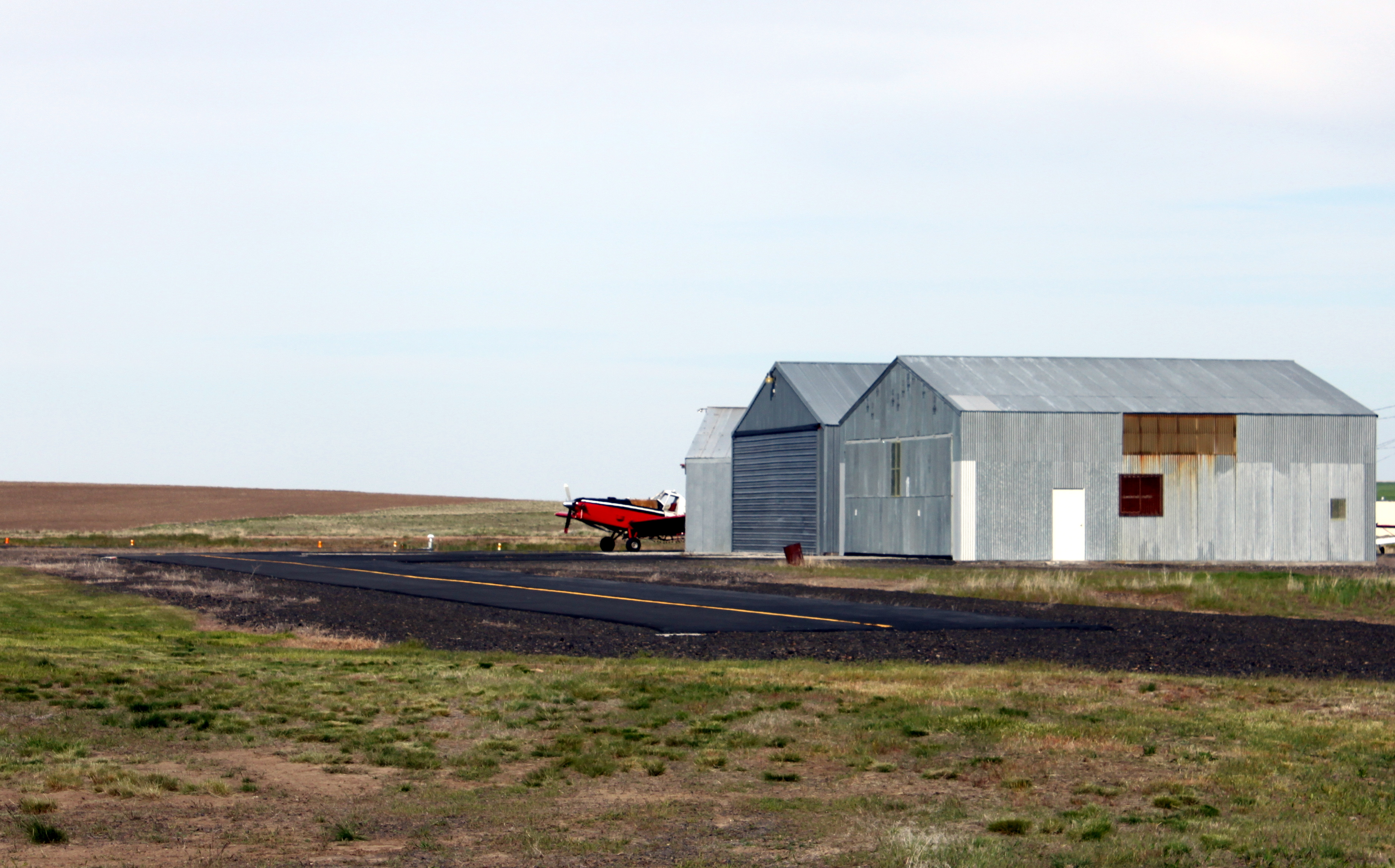
- Condon State Airport/Pauling Field
- IATA: none; ICAO: none; FAA LID: 3S9

Summary
- Airport type: Public
- Operator: Oregon Department of Aviation
- Location: Condon, Oregon
- Elevation AMSL: 2,911 ft / 887.3 m
- Coordinates: 45°14′47.6400″N 120°09′59.22″W
- Interactive map of Condon State Airport

Runways
Direction	Length		Surface
Direction	ft	m	Surface
7/25	3,500	1,067	Concrete

Condon State Airport (FAA LID: 3S9) is a public airport 1 mile (1.6 km) northeast of the city of Condon in Gilliam County, Oregon.

The airport is also known as Pauling Field, after Nobel laureate Linus Pauling, who lived in Condon during his youth.
