= Toledo State Airport =

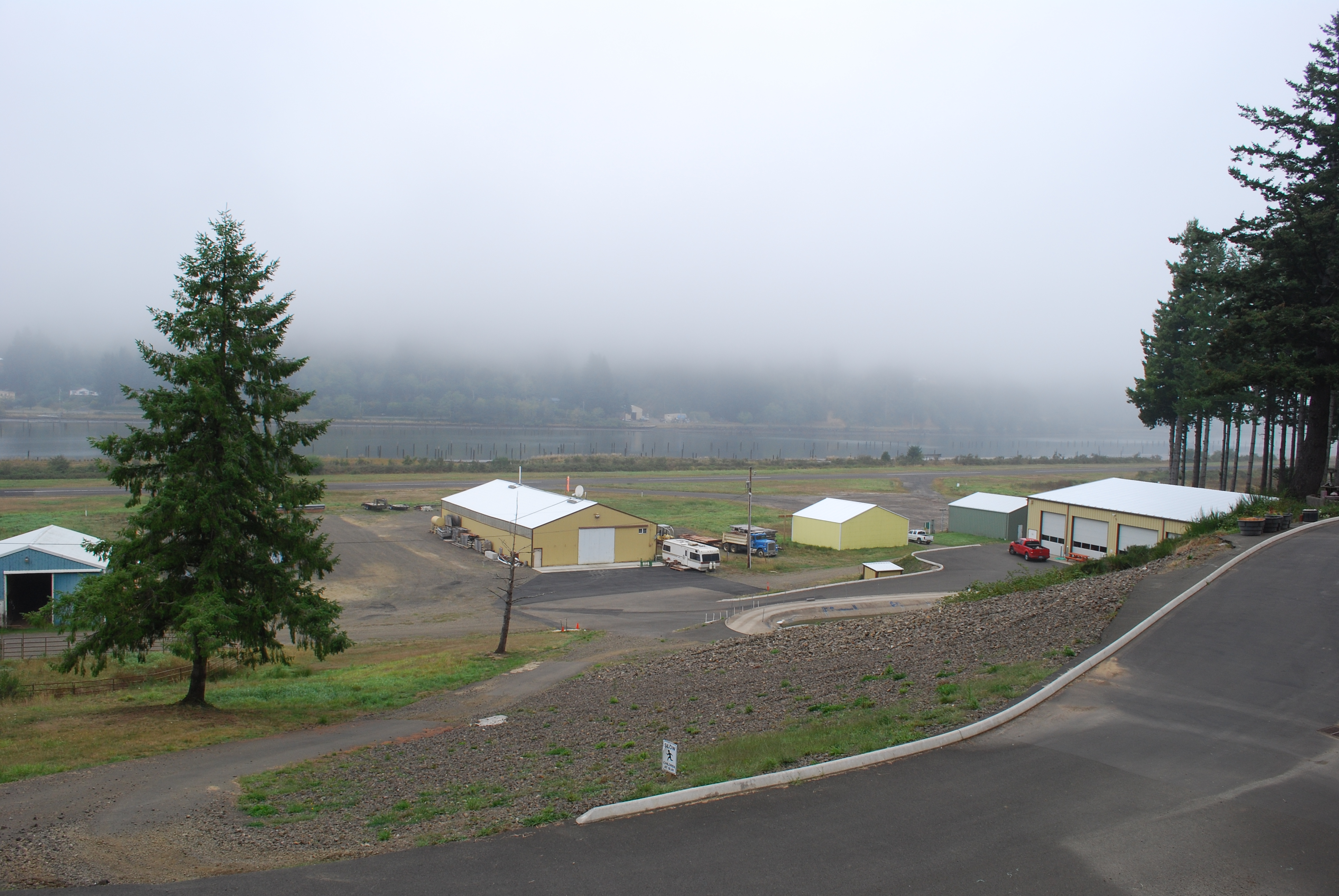
- IATA: none; ICAO: none; FAA LID: 5S4

Summary
- Airport type: Public
- Operator: Oregon Department of Aviation
- Location: Toledo, Oregon
- Elevation AMSL: 7 ft / 2.1 m
- Coordinates: 44°36′03.4260″N 123°56′22.41″W
- Interactive map of Toledo State Airport

Runways
Direction	Length		Surface
Direction	ft	m	Surface
13/31	1,750	533	Asphalt

Toledo State Airport (FAA LID: 5S4) is a public airport located one mile (1.6 km) southwest of Toledo in Lincoln County, Oregon, United States.
