= Wasco State Airport =

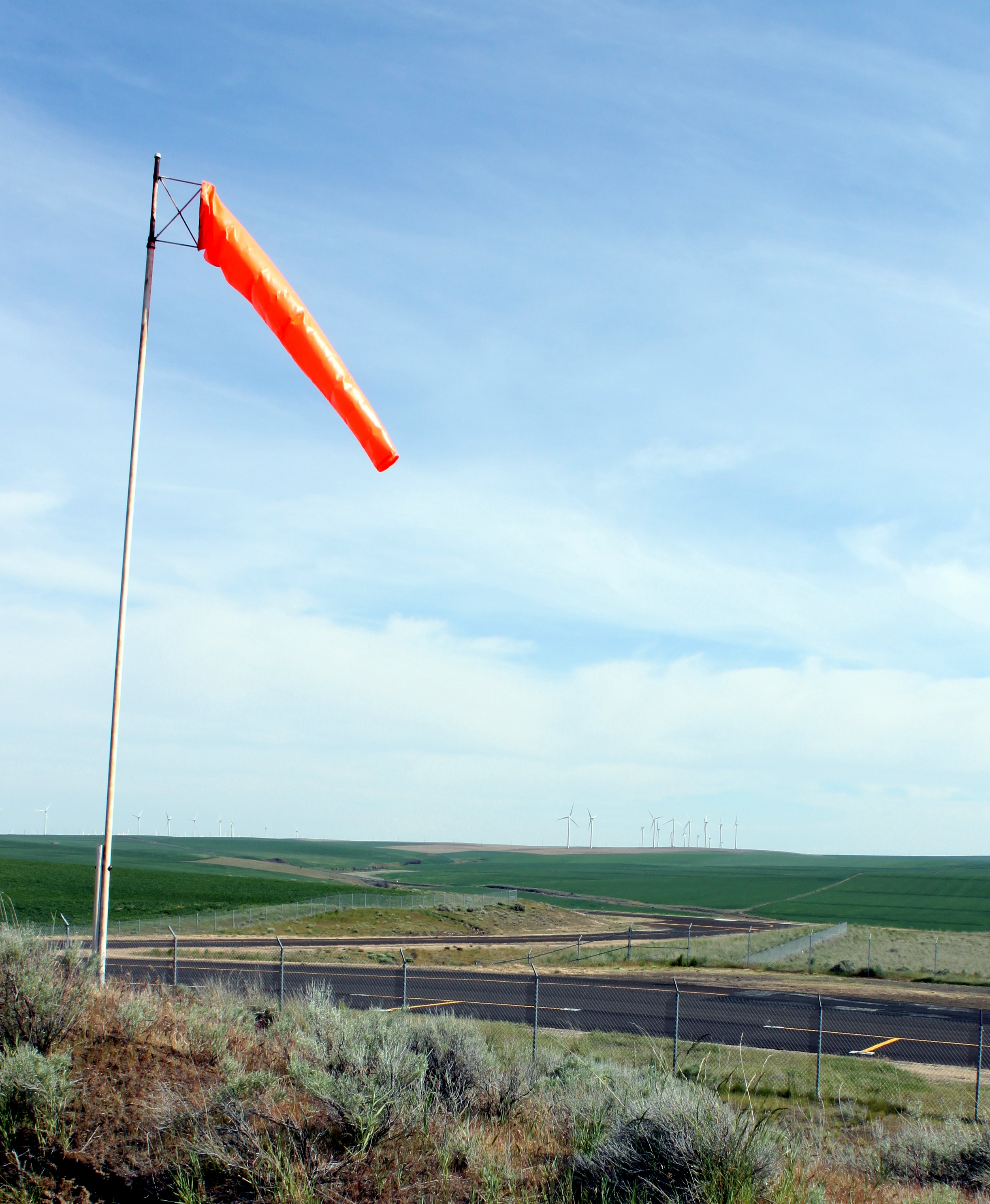
- IATA: none; ICAO: FAA: 35S

Summary
- Airport type: Public
- Operator: Oregon Department of Aviation
- Location: Wasco, Oregon
- Elevation AMSL: 1,503 ft / 458 m
- Coordinates: 45°35′22.0000″N 120°40′27.00″W
- Interactive map of Wasco State Airport

Runways
Direction	Length		Surface
Direction	ft	m	Surface
7/25	3,450	1,052	Asphalt

Wasco State Airport (FAA LID: 35S) is a public airport located one mile (1.6 km) east of Wasco in Sherman County, Oregon, United States.
