= Rome State Airport =

- IATA: REO; ICAO: KREO; FAA LID: REO

Summary
- Airport type: Public
- Owner: Oregon Department of Aviation
- Serves: Rome, Oregon
- Elevation AMSL: 4,053 ft / 1,235 m
- Coordinates: 42°34′40″N 117°53′08″W

Map
- Location of airport in Oregon / United States REO (the United States)

Runways
Direction	Length		Surface
Direction	ft	m	Surface
3/21	6,000	1,829	Gravel

Statistics (2009)
- Aircraft operations: 100
- Source: Federal Aviation Administration

Rome State Airport (IATA: REO, ICAO: KREO, FAA LID: REO) is a public use airport located 20 nautical miles (23 mi, 37 km) southwest of the central business district of Rome, in Malheur County, Oregon, United States. It is owned by the Oregon Department of Aviation.

== History ==
The airport was built by the United States Army Air Forces about 1942, and was known as Rome Flight Strip. It was an emergency landing airfield for military aircraft on training flights. It was closed after World War II, and was turned over for local government use by the War Assets Administration (WAA).

== Facilities and aircraft ==
Rome State Airport covers an area of 147 acres (59 ha) at an elevation of 4,053 feet (1,235 m) above mean sea level. It has one runway designated 3/21 with a gravel surface measuring 6,000 by 150 feet (1,829 x 46 m). For the 12-month period ending May 13, 2009, the airport had 100 general aviation aircraft operations, an average of 8 per month.
