= Crescent Lake, Oregon =

Unincorporated community in the state of Oregon, United States

Coordinates: 43°30′12″N 121°55′50″W

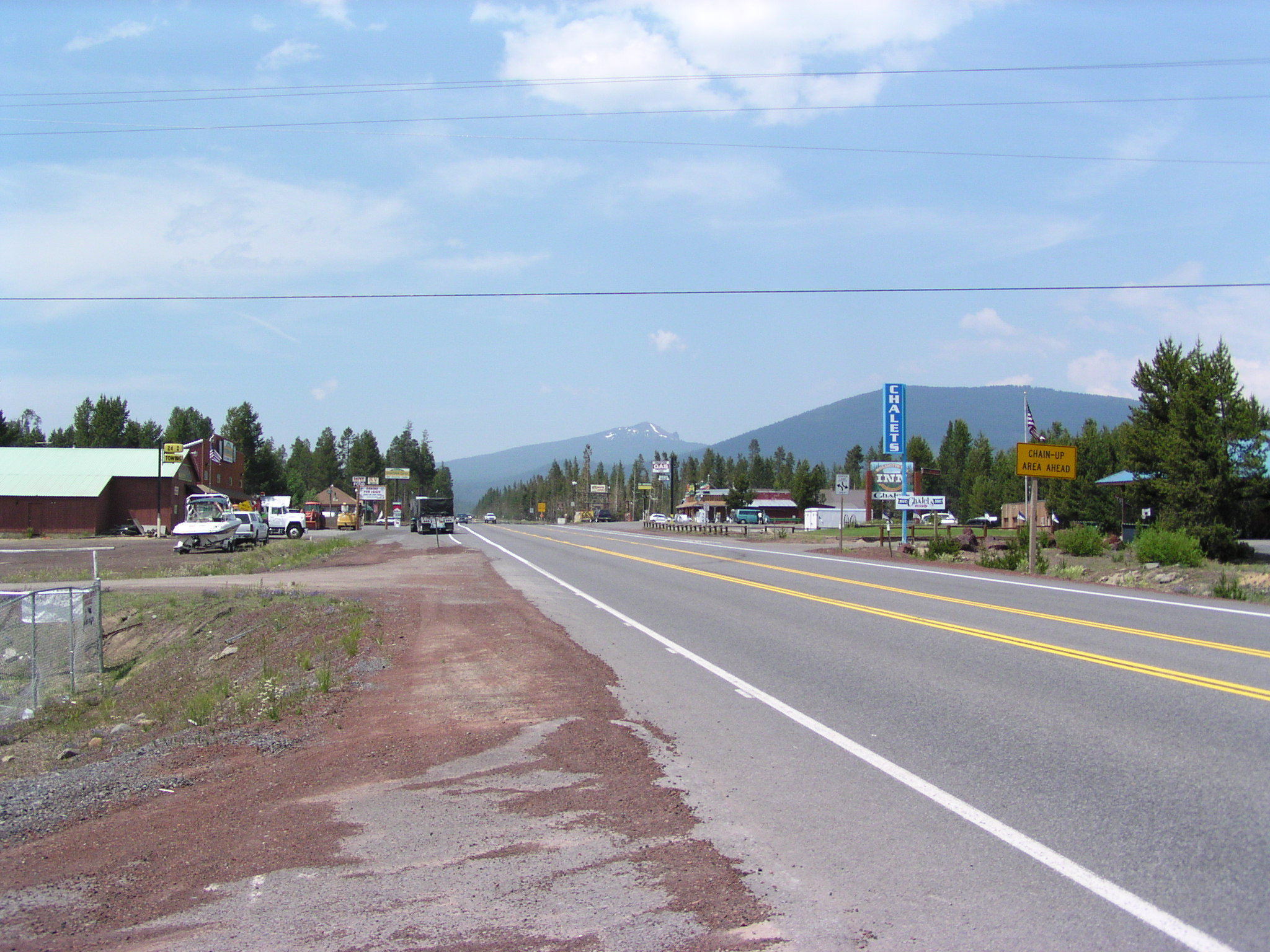
Crescent Lake Junction

Crescent Lake is an unincorporated community and census-designated place (CDP) in Klamath County, Oregon, United States. It is situated 2.5 miles (4.0 km) northeast of the lake Crescent Lake and 2 miles (3.2 km) south of Odell Lake on Oregon Route 58, and is next to Crescent Lake State Airport. Crescent Lake was first listed as a CDP prior to the 2020 census. As of the 2020 census, Crescent Lake had a population of 119. The north end of the CDP, at the intersection of Route 58 and Crescent Lake Highway (Oregon Route 429), is known as Crescent Lake Junction.

== History ==
The community of Crescent Lake was originally located along the Southern Pacific Railroad line, 2 miles (3.2 km) south by southwest of the current Crescent Lake Junction. The former site was built after the completion of a section of railroad in 1923 (opened in 1926) called the Natron Cutoff, in the Cascade Range. This section superseded the route through the Siskiyou Mountains for trains traveling between the Willamette Valley and California. The community of Crescent Lake was built to service the steam trains that operated on the line until the 1950s and to maintain the track and signals over the adjacent section of the main line.

Crescent Lake also served as a division meeting point where the operation of freight trains passed to fresh crews. Trains bound from Oregon to California were manned by crews from Eugene in the Willamette Valley up the "Hill" to Crescent Lake, where crews from Klamath Falls relieved them for the continuation of travel to Dunsmuir in northern California. Crews operating trains in the opposite direction were similarly relieved at Crescent Lake. Each of the relieved crews remained at Crescent Lake for a mandatory rest period, after which they relieved an arriving crew and returned to their respective home location.

The site included a train depot, a roundhouse, a lodging facility for resting train crews which was known as the "Clubhouse", two general stores (one containing a tavern), a restaurant, a one-room schoolhouse, and a post office. The local railroad staff included a complete section gang (right-of-way maintainers), a signal maintainer, an electrician, a station agent and shift operators, a trainmaster, a yardmaster, and several other tradesmen. After World War II, the community began moving to its present site along Oregon Route 58, which had been completed a few years earlier in 1940. In 1958, the roundhouse was decommissioned and soon torn down, and in 1970 a fire in the restaurant destroyed the remaining businesses on what is now known as Crescent Lake Highway. A few dilapidated houses remained occupied along Crescent Lake Highway as recently as the 1990s. However, the local fire department purposely destroyed what remained of the ghost town during a training exercise. All that remains of the former site is a water tower and a parking lot for winter recreation. The local post office was located in the "Odell Sportsman" general store, it was destroyed in a fire on January 23, 2009, but is now operational.

== Education ==
It is within the Klamath County School District.

It is in the territory of Central Oregon Community College.
