= Joseph State Airport =

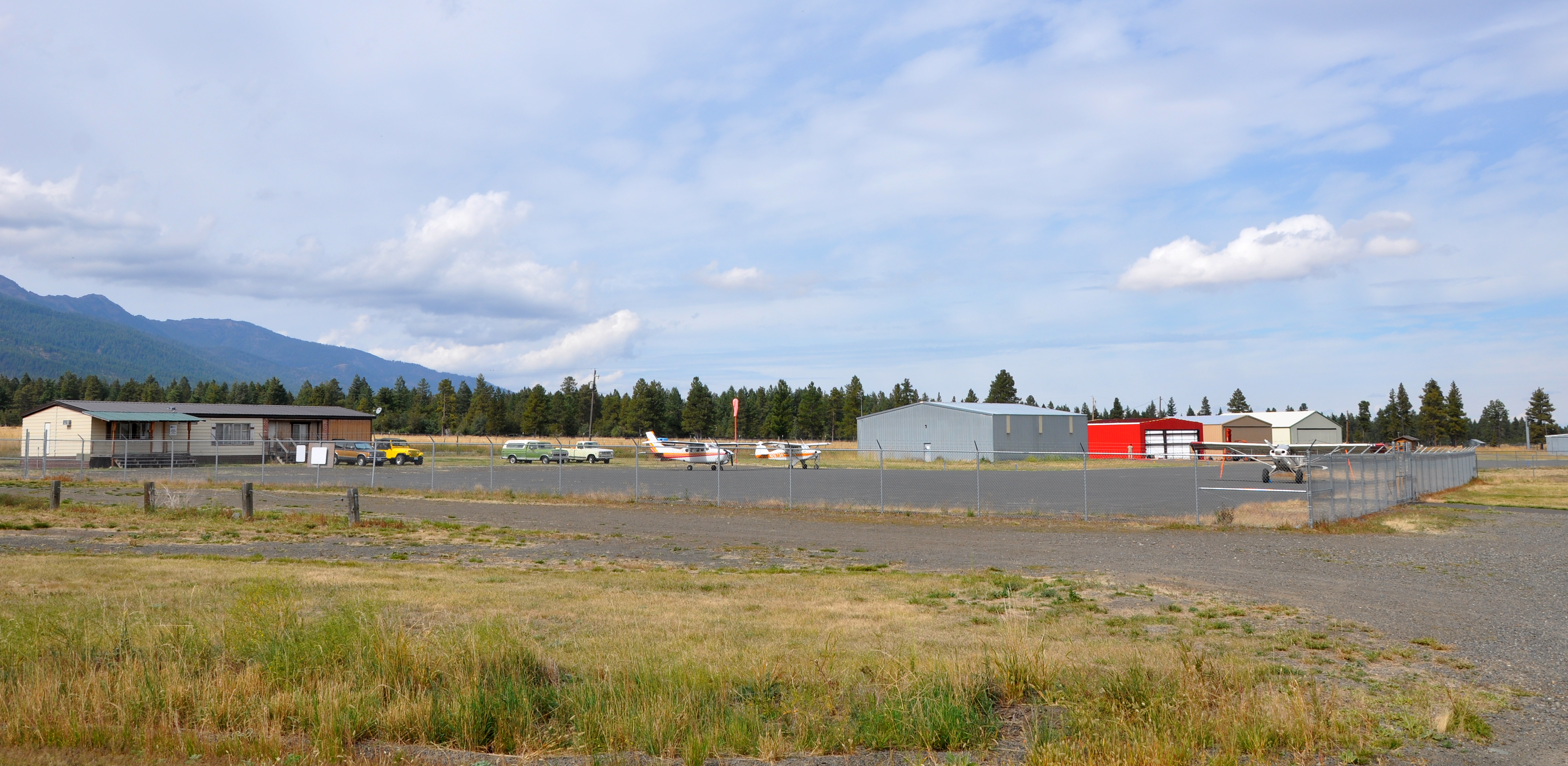
- IATA: none; ICAO: KJSY; FAA LID: JSY

Summary
- Airport type: Public
- Owner: Oregon Department of Aviation
- Serves: Joseph, Oregon
- Elevation AMSL: 4,126 ft (1,258 m)
- Coordinates: 45°21′34″N 117°15′14″W
- Interactive map of Joseph State Airport

Runways
| Direction | Length | | Surface |
| Direction | ft | m | Surface |
|---|---|---|---|
| 15/33 | 5,202 | 1,586 | Asphalt |

Statistics (2018)
- Aircraft operations (year ending 8/28/2018): 3,850
- Based aircraft: 14
- Source: Federal Aviation Administration

Joseph State Airport (ICAO: KJSY, FAA LID: JSY, formerly 4S3) is a public use airport located one nautical mile (1.85 km) west of the central business district of Joseph, a city in Wallowa County, Oregon, United States. It is owned by the Oregon Department of Aviation.

Commercial flights are not currently available to Joseph. The nearest commercial flights are at the Eastern Oregon Regional Airport in Pendleton.

Although many U.S. airports use the same three-letter location identifier for the FAA and IATA, this airport is assigned JSY by the FAA but has no designation from the IATA (which assigned JSY to Syros Island National Airport on Syros Island in Greece).

== Facilities and aircraft ==
Joseph State Airport covers an area of 103 acres (42 ha) at an elevation of 4,126 feet (1,258 m) above mean sea level. It has one runway designated 15/33 with an asphalt surface measuring 5,202 by 60 feet (1,586 x 18 m). The airport has automatic lighting and no control tower.

For the 12-month period ending August 28, 2018, the airport had 3,850 aircraft operations, an average of 74 per week: 94% general aviation and 6% air taxi. At that time there were 14 aircraft based at this airport: all single-engine.
