= Oakridge State Airport =

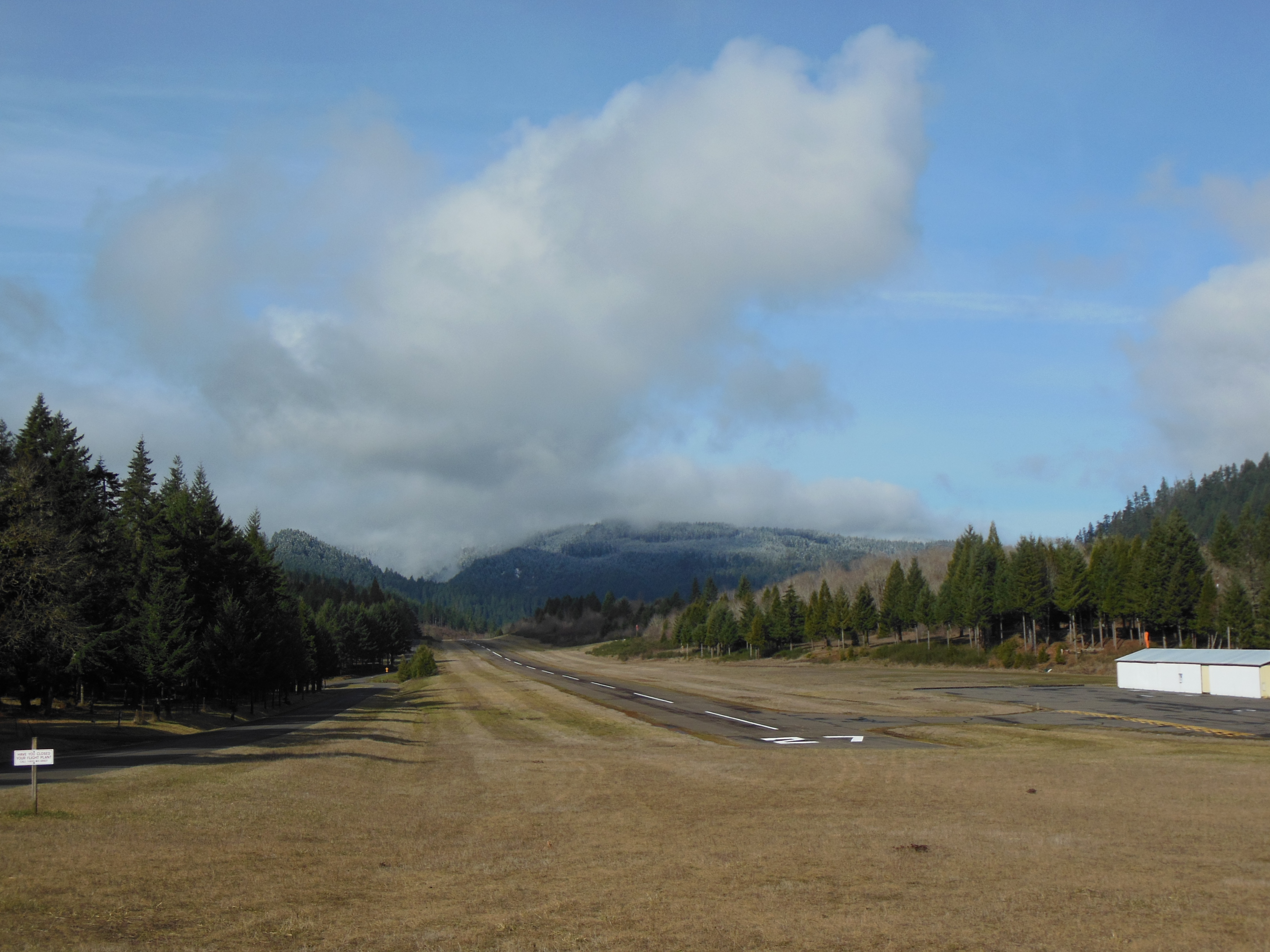
- IATA: none; ICAO: none; FAA LID: 5S0

Summary
- Airport type: Public
- Operator: Oregon Department of Aviation
- Location: Oakridge, Oregon
- Elevation AMSL: 1,393 ft / 425 m
- Coordinates: 43°45′09.4440″N 122°30′9.19″W
- Interactive map of Oakridge State Airport

Runways
Direction	Length		Surface
Direction	ft	m	Surface
9/27	3,610	1,100	Asphalt

Oakridge State Airport (FAA LID: 5S0) is a public airport located 1 mile (1.6 km) west of Oakridge, in Lane County, Oregon, United States.

== Runway ==
Oakridge Airport has one runway designated 9/27 with an asphalt surface measuring 3610 by 47 feet (1,100 x 14 m).
