= Cottage Grove State Airport =

Cottage Grove State Airport Jim Wright Field
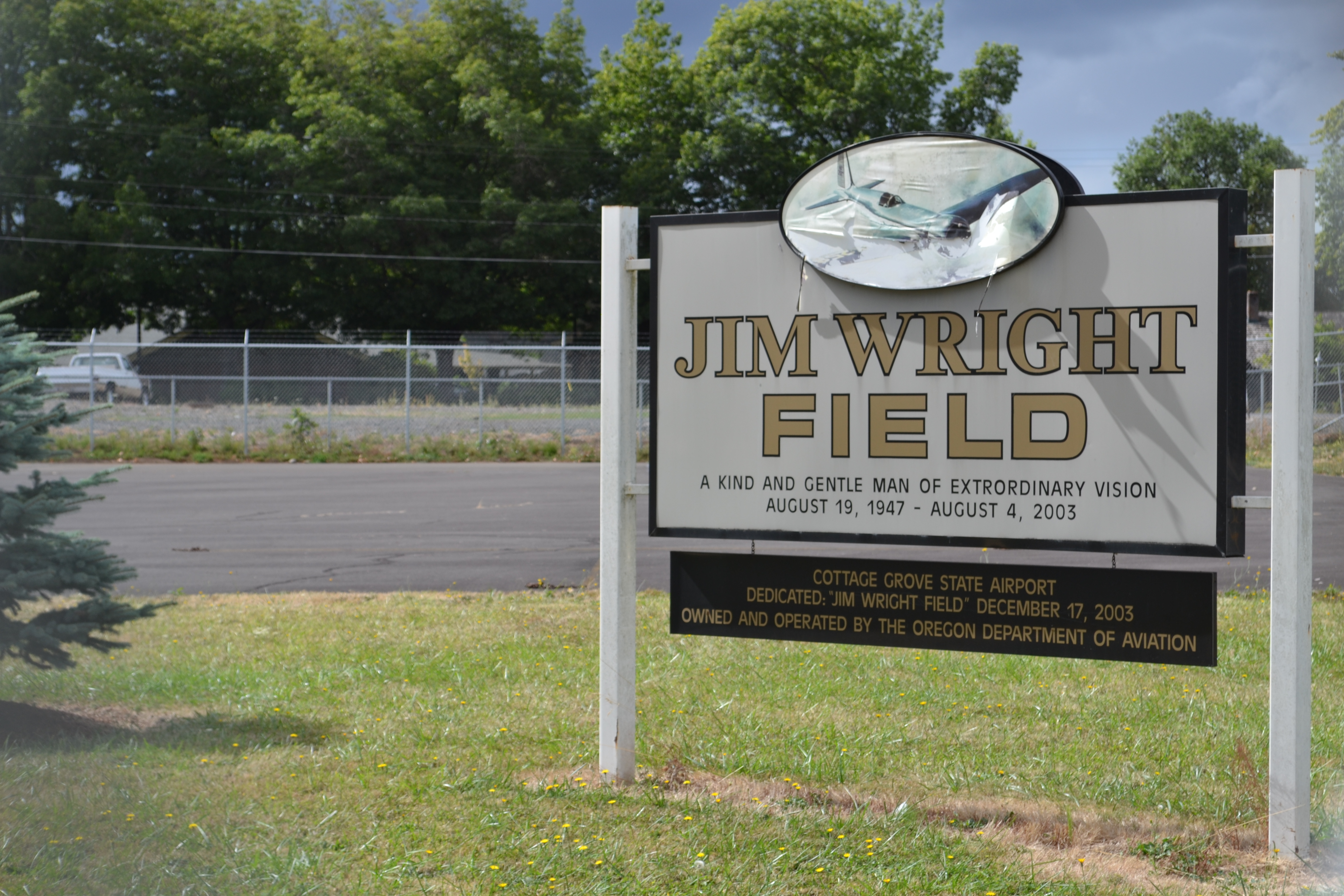
- IATA: none; ICAO: - FAA: 61S

Summary
- Airport type: Public
- Operator: Oregon Department of Aviation
- Location: Cottage Grove, Oregon
- Elevation AMSL: 641 ft / 195 m
- Coordinates: 43°47′59.4430″N 123°01′44.28″W
- Interactive map of Cottage Grove State Airport

Runways
Direction	Length		Surface
Direction	ft	m	Surface
15/33	3,188	972	Asphalt

Cottage Grove State Airport or Jim Wright Field (FAA LID: 61S), is a public airport serving small general aviation aircraft, located one mile (1.6 km) east of the city of Cottage Grove in Lane County, Oregon, USA.

On December 17, 2003 the airfield was named after Jim Wright, a local aviator and businessman who built a reproduction Hughes H-1 Racer. Wright died in an aircraft accident on August 4, 2003.
