= McKenzie Bridge State Airport =

- IATA: none; ICAO: none; FAA LID: 00S

Summary
- Airport type: Public
- Operator: Oregon Department of Aviation
- Location: McKenzie Bridge, Oregon
- Elevation AMSL: 1,620 ft / 494 m
- Coordinates: 44°10′59.4400″N 122°05′19.20″W
- Interactive map of McKenzie Bridge State Airport

Runways
Direction	Length		Surface
Direction	ft	m	Surface
6/24	2,600	792	Turf

McKenzie Bridge State Airport (FAA LID: 00S) is a public airport located 3 miles (4.8 km) east of McKenzie Bridge, in Lane County, Oregon, United States.

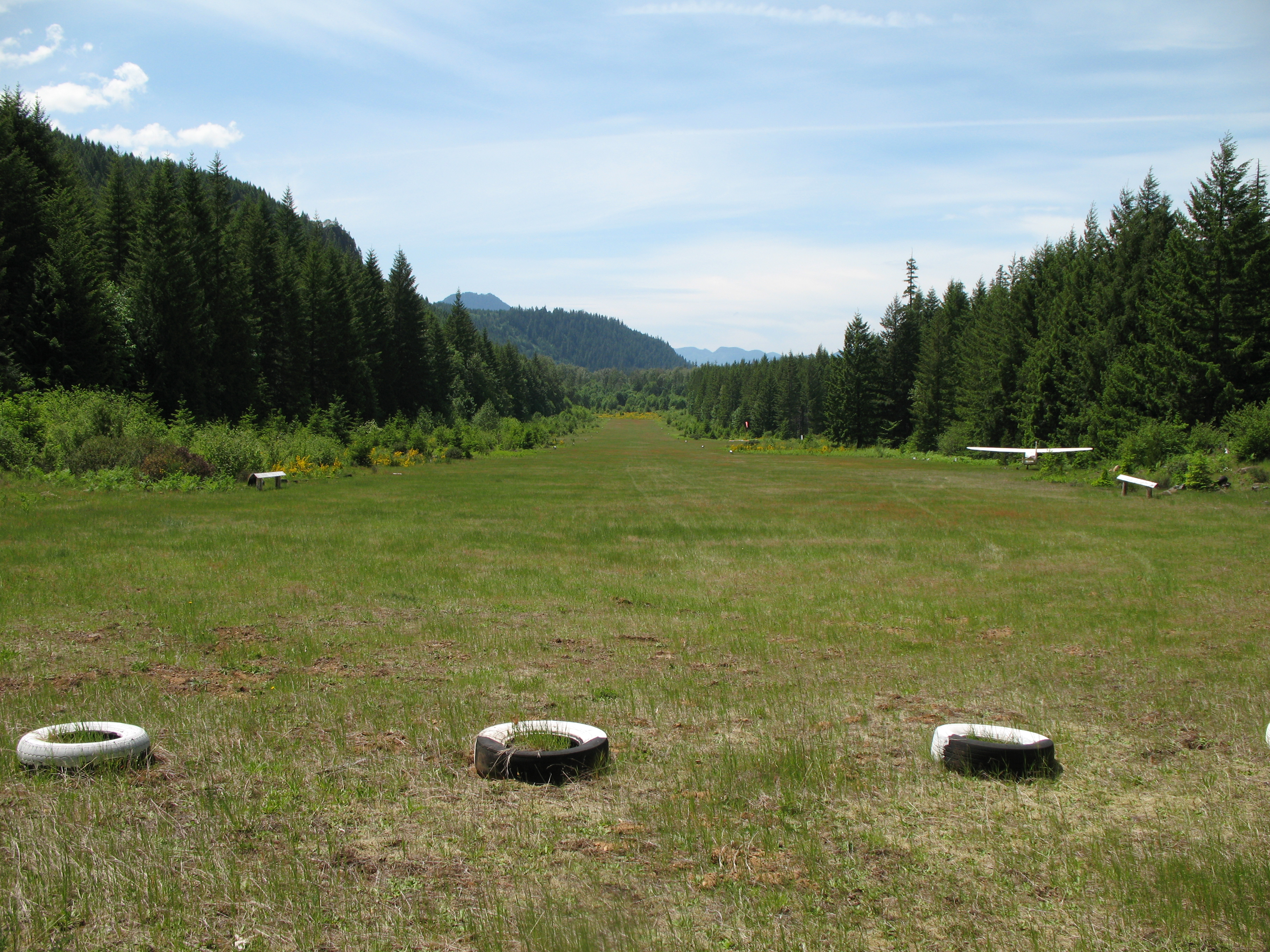
Runway 24

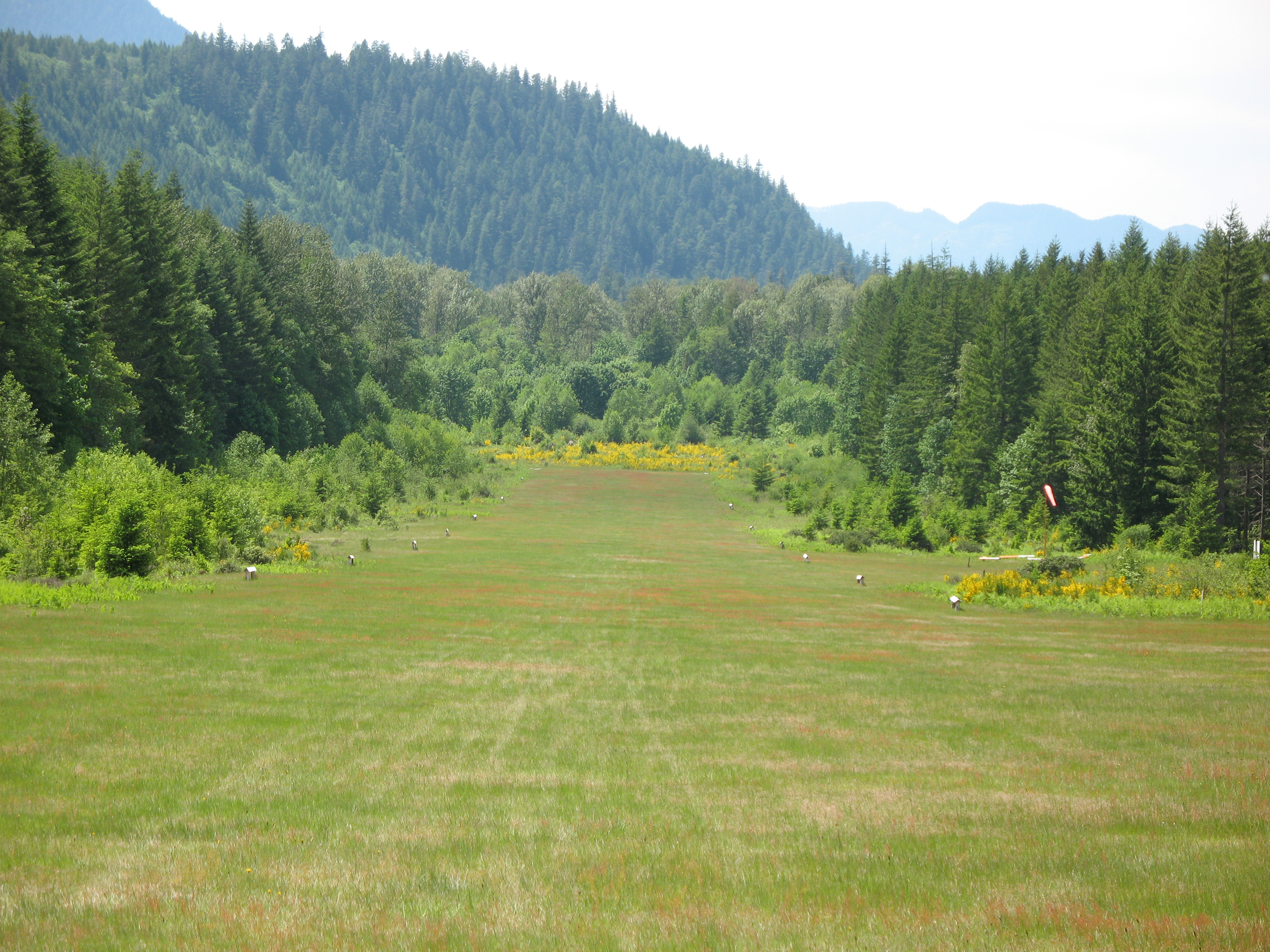
Closeup of RY 24
