= Cascade Locks State Airport =

Airport in Oregon, United States

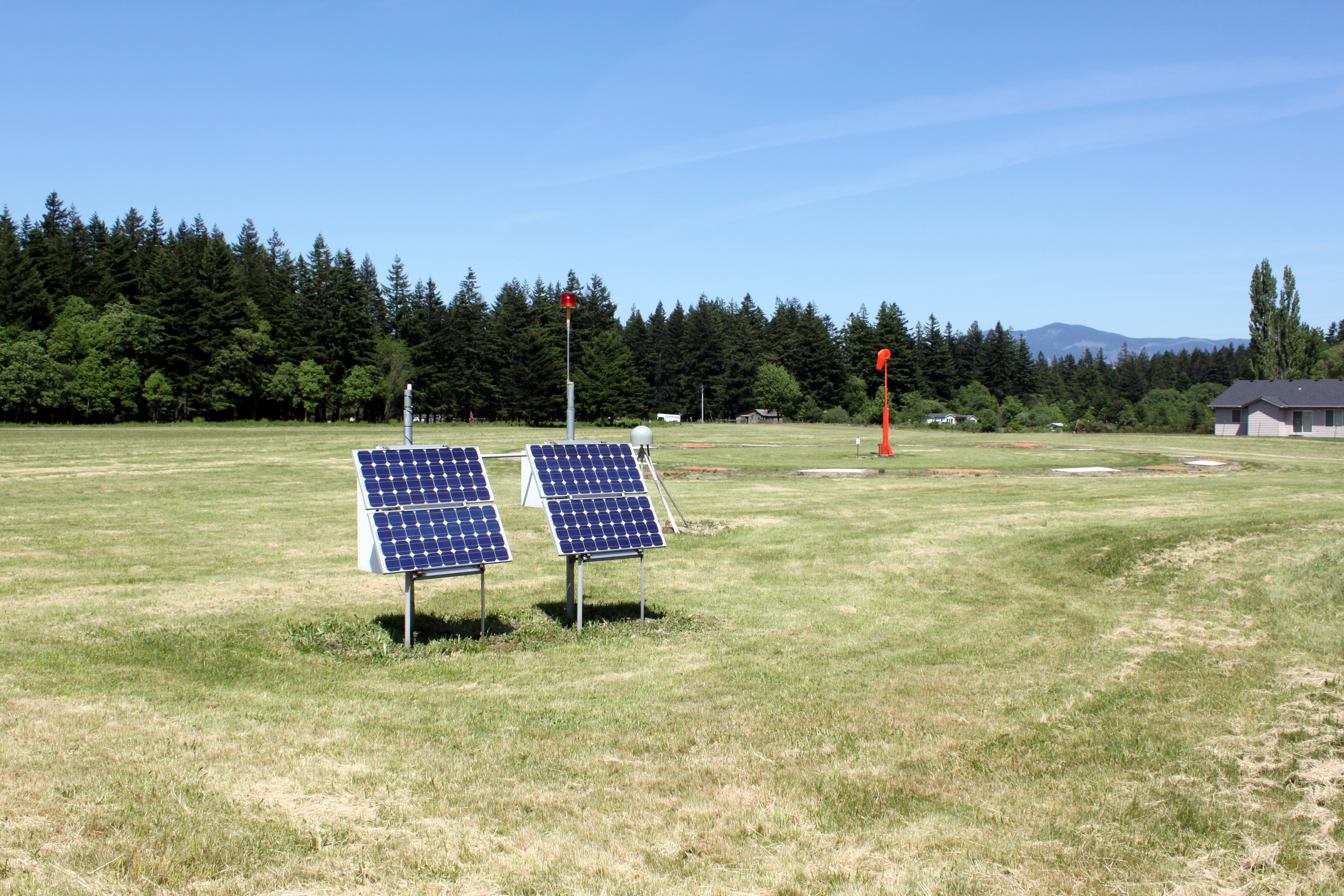
- Windsock and solar panels at the airport
- IATA: CZK; ICAO: KCZK; FAA LID: CZK

Summary
- Airport type: Public
- Owner: Oregon Department of Aviation
- Serves: Cascade Locks, Oregon
- Elevation AMSL: 151 ft (46 m)
- Coordinates: 45°40′37″N 121°52′44″W
- Interactive map of Cascade Locks State Airport

Runways
Direction	Length		Surface
Direction	ft	m	Surface
6/24	1,800	549	Asphalt

Statistics (2011)
- Aircraft operations: 1,500
- Source: Federal Aviation Administration

Cascade Locks State Airport (IATA: CZK, ICAO: KCZK, FAA LID: CZK) is a public use airport located one nautical mile (2 km) northeast of the central business district of Cascade Locks, a city in Hood River County, Oregon, United States. It is owned by the Oregon Department of Aviation.

== Facilities and aircraft ==
Cascade Locks State Airport covers an area of 37 acres (15 ha) at an elevation of 151 feet (46 m) above mean sea level. It has one runway designated 6/24 with an asphalt surface measuring 1,800 by 30 feet (549 x 9 m). For the 12-month period ending June 17, 2011, the airport had 1,500 general aviation aircraft operations, an average of 125 per month.
