= Independence State Airport =

Coordinates: 44°52′01″N 123°11′54″W

Independence State Airport Independence Airpark
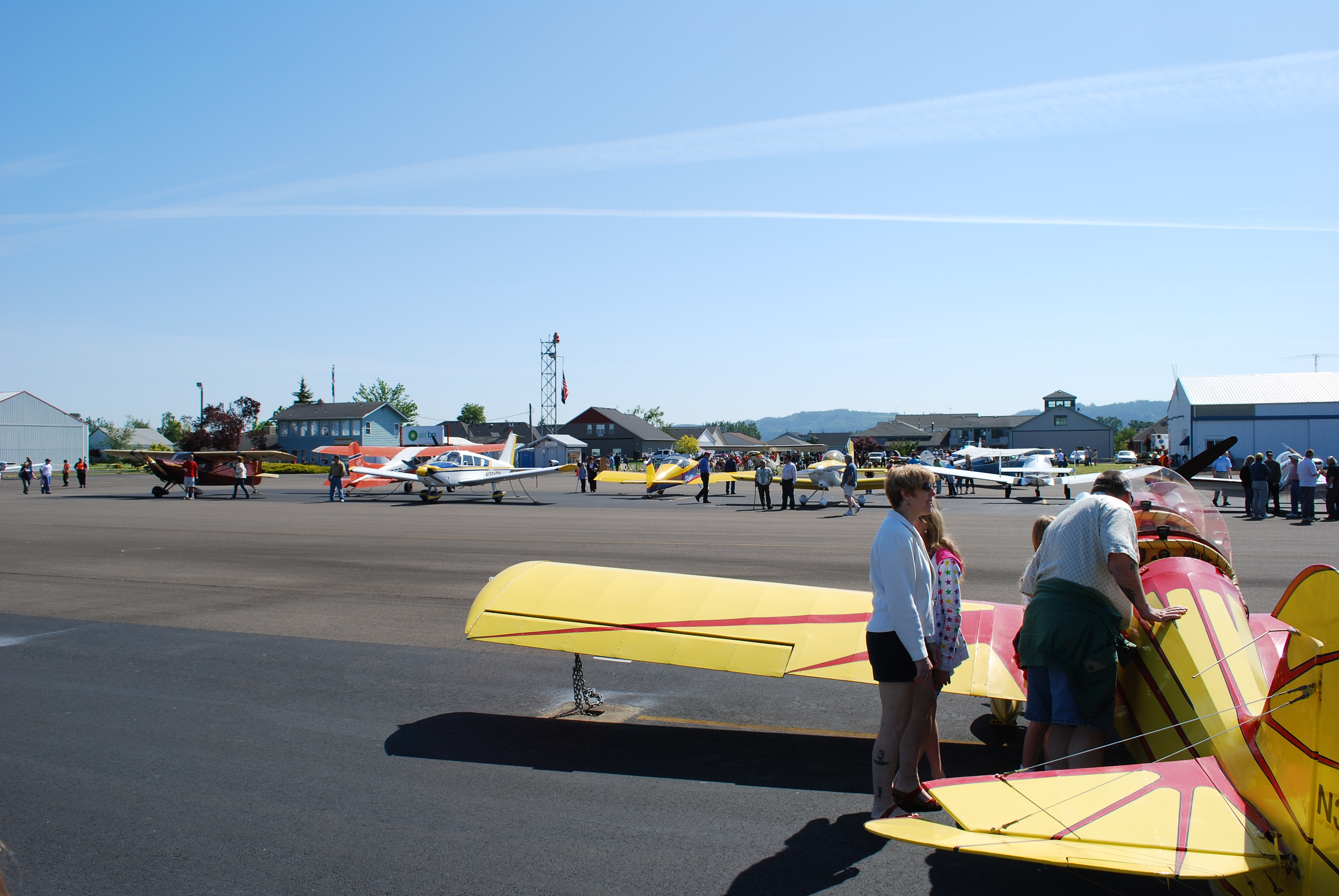
- IATA: none; ICAO: none; FAA LID: 7S5

Summary
- Airport type: Public
- Owner: Oregon Department of Aviation
- Serves: Independence, Oregon
- Elevation AMSL: 180 ft (55 m)
- Interactive map of Independence State Airport

Runways
Direction	Length		Surface
Direction	ft	m	Surface
16/34	3,002	915	Asphalt

Statistics (2019)
- Aircraft operations (year ending 10/22/2019): 33,658
- Based aircraft: 164
- Source: Federal Aviation Administration

Independence State Airport (FAA LID: 7S5) is a public-use airport located one mile (1.6 km) northwest of the central business district of Independence, a city in Polk County, Oregon, United States. It is owned by the Oregon Department of Aviation.

Serving as a general aviation airport, Independence also hosts a large residential airpark. This facility is Oregon's only public-use airport hosting an airpark.

== Airport information and statistics ==
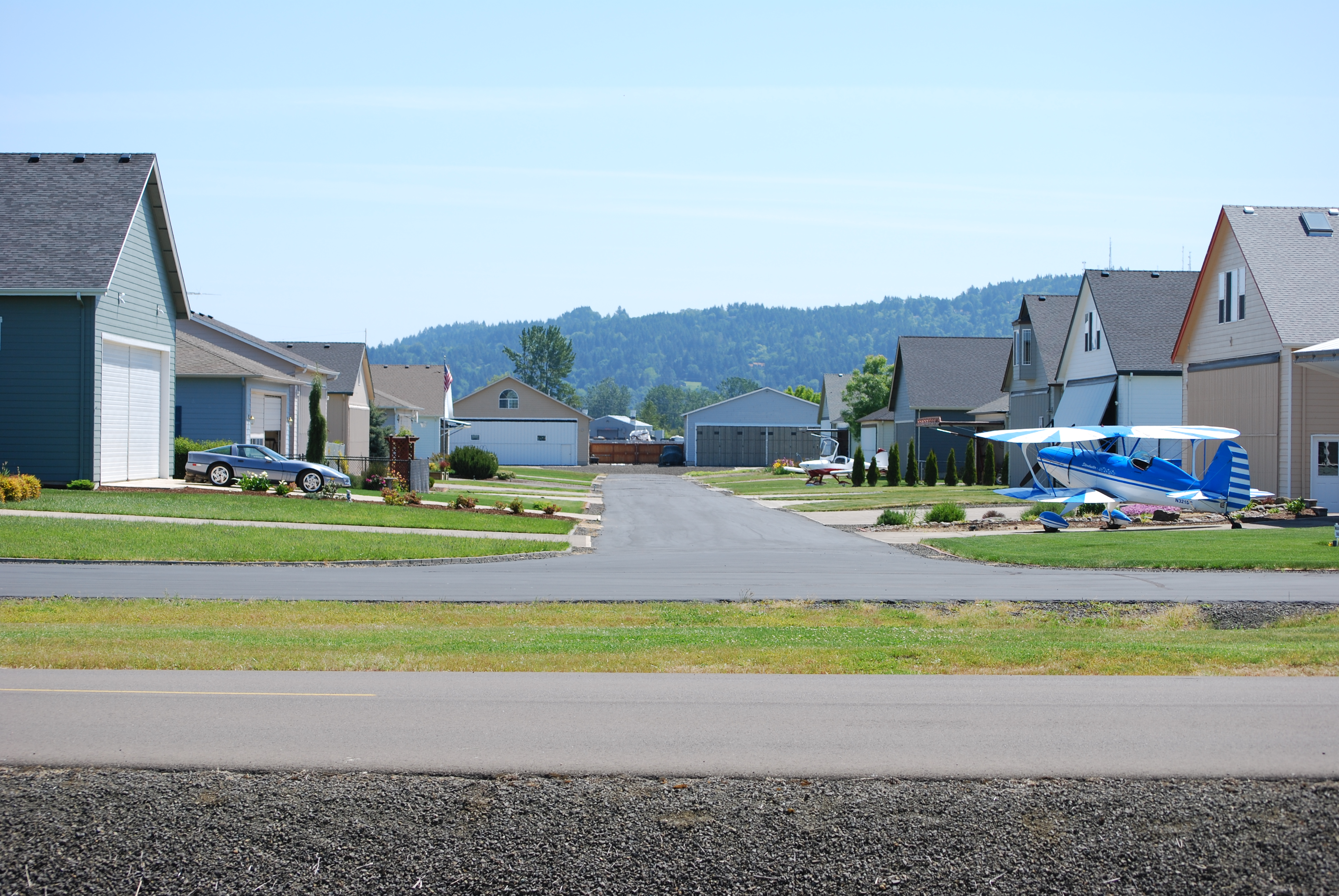

Independence State Airport covers an area of 69 acres (28 ha), which contains one runway designated 16/34 with a 3,002 x 60 ft (915 x 18 m) asphalt pavement.

For the 12-month period ending October 22, 2019, the airport had 33,658 aircraft operations, an average of 92 per day: 97% general aviation and 3% air taxi. At that time there were 164 aircraft based at this airport: 155 single-engine, 4 multi-engine and 5 glider.

The Starduster Cafe at the airport serves breakfast and brunch.

== Incidents ==
On September 19, 2018, a Rutan Long-EZ crashed while landing after the front landing gear collapsed, injuring the pilot.
