= McDermitt State Airport =

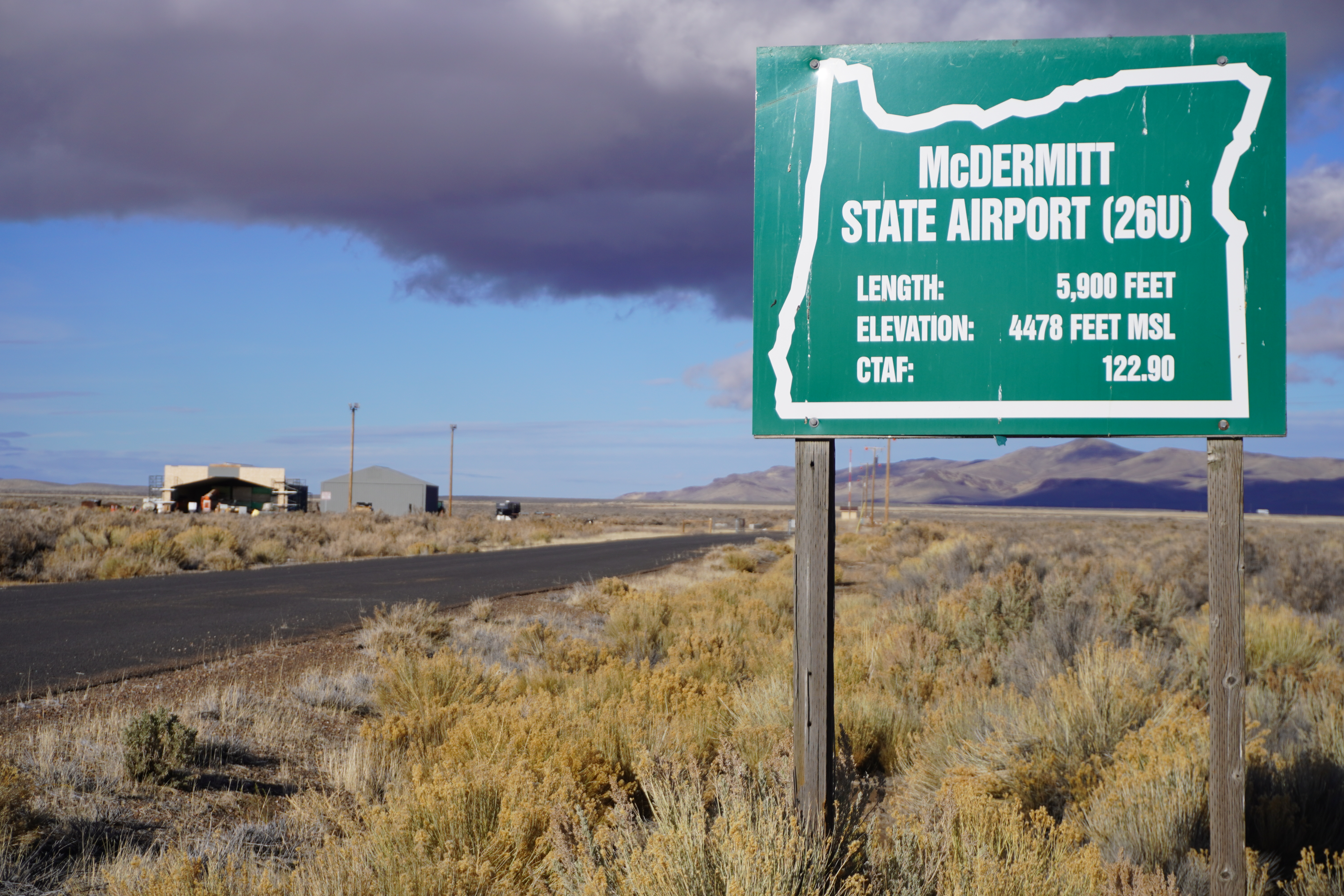
- IATA: none; ICAO: none; FAA LID: 26U

Summary
- Airport type: Public
- Operator: Oregon Department of Aviation
- Location: McDermitt, Oregon
- Elevation AMSL: 4,478 ft / 1,365 m
- Coordinates: 42°00′07.5990″N 117°43′23.51″W
- Interactive map of McDermitt State Airport

Runways
Direction	Length		Surface
Direction	ft	m	Surface
16/34	5,900	1,798	Asphalt

McDermitt State Airport (FAA LID: 26U), is a public airport located ½ mile (0.75 km) northwest of McDermitt, Nevada in Malheur County, Oregon, USA.
