= Crescent Lake State Airport =

- IATA: none; ICAO: - FAA: 5S2

Summary
- Airport type: Public
- Operator: Oregon Department of Aviation
- Location: Crescent Lake, Oregon
- Elevation AMSL: 4,810 ft / 1,466 m
- Coordinates: 43°31′57.4470″N 121°57′0.11″W
- Interactive map of Crescent Lake State Airport

Runways
Direction	Length		Surface
Direction	ft	m	Surface
13/31	3,900	1,189	Asphalt

Crescent Lake State Airport (FAA LID: 5S2) is a public airport located two miles (3.2 km) north of Crescent Lake in Klamath County, Oregon, United States. On-airport camping is allowed, and boat rentals are available nearby. The airport is closed from November 1 through May 1 due to snow.
