= Clearwater, Oregon =

Unincorporated community in Oregon, United States

Coordinates: 43°15′46″N 122°25′19″W

Clearwater is an unincorporated community in Douglas County, Oregon, United States. It is located north of Oregon Route 138 about 43 miles east of Glide, at the confluence of the North Umpqua and Clearwater rivers. It is within the Umpqua National Forest near Toketee Falls and Toketee Lake.
