= Mulino State Airport =

Airport in Oregon, United States

Mulino State Airport Mulino Airport
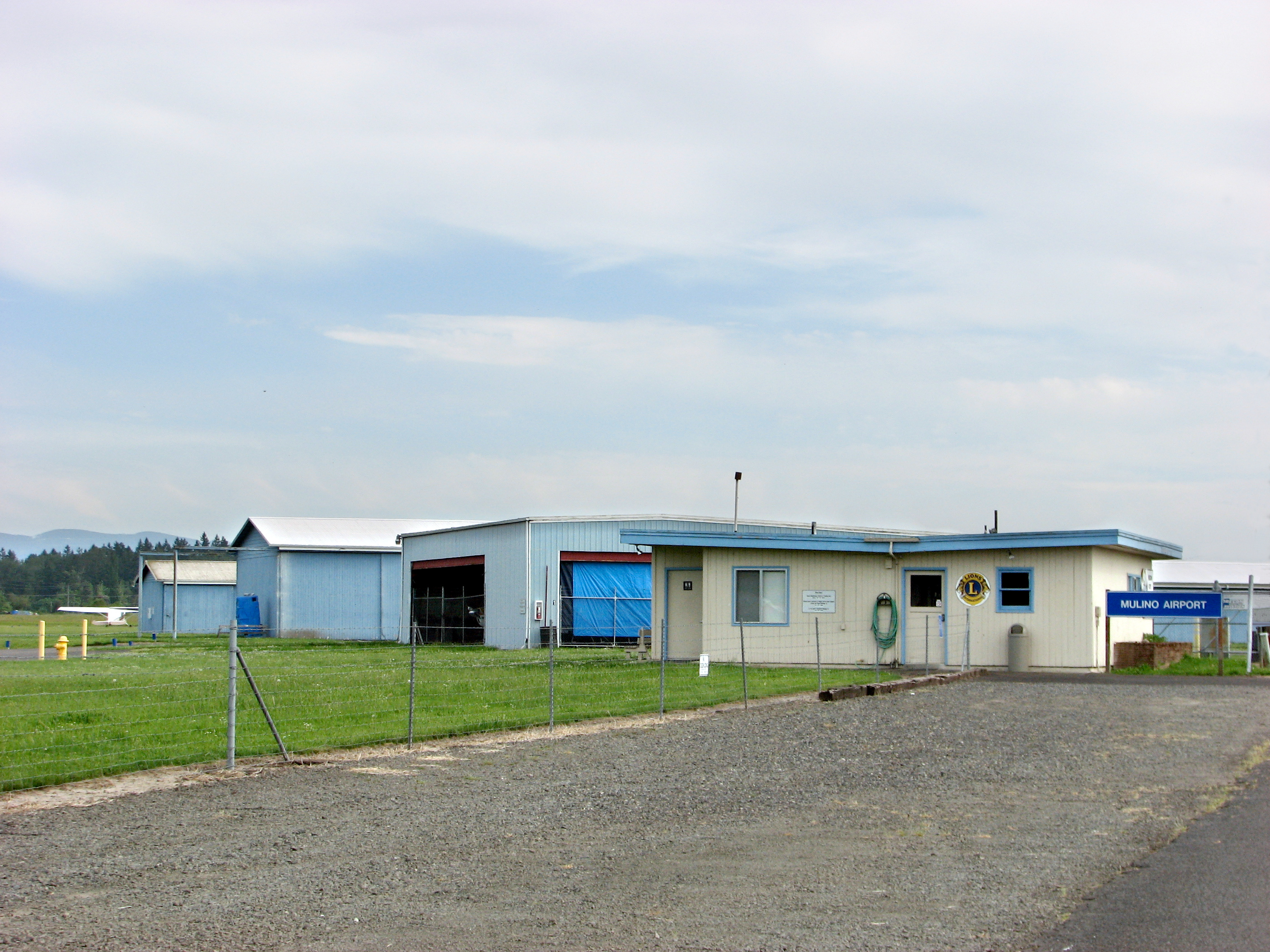
- IATA: none; ICAO: none; FAA LID: 4S9

Summary
- Airport type: Public
- Owner: Oregon Department of Aviation
- Serves: Portland / Mulino, Oregon
- Elevation AMSL: 260 ft (79 m)
- Coordinates: 45°12′59″N 122°35′24″W

Map
- Location of airport in Oregon

Runways
| Direction | Length | | Surface |
| Direction | ft | m | Surface |
|---|---|---|---|
| 14/32 | 3,425 | 1,044 | Asphalt |

Statistics (2020)
- Aircraft operations (year ending 12/9/2020): 21,300
- Based aircraft: 61
- Source: Federal Aviation Administration

Mulino State Airport (FAA LID: 4S9) is a public airport located at Mulino, Oregon, United States near the city of Molalla, about 20 nautical miles (23 mi, 37 km) south of Portland with access from Interstate 205 via Oregon Route 213. Also known as Mulino Airport, it was owned by the Port of Portland from 1988 until it was transferred to the Oregon Department of Aviation on July 1, 2009. It was previously also known as Portland-Mulino Airport.

== Overview ==
This airport is included in the National Plan of Integrated Airport Systems for 2011–2015, which categorized it as a general aviation facility. It is home to over 40 light general aviation aircraft (including weekend glider activities) with 34 existing aircraft T-hangars and approximately 25 tie-down spots. Mulino is also home to the Mulino Chapter of the Oregon Pilot Association.

== Facilities and aircraft ==
Mulino State Airport covers an area of 275 acres (111 ha) at an elevation of 260 feet (79 m) above mean sea level. It has one runway designated 14/32 with an asphalt surface measuring 3,425 by 100 feet (1,044 x 30 m).

For the 12-month period ending December 9, 2020, the airport had 21,300 general aviation aircraft operations, an average of 58 per day. At that time there were 61 aircraft based at this airport: 57 single-engine, 2 multi-engine, and 2 glider.

== See also ==
- Portland International Airport
- Portland-Troutdale Airport
- Pearson Field
- Hillsboro Airport
