= Bandon State Airport =

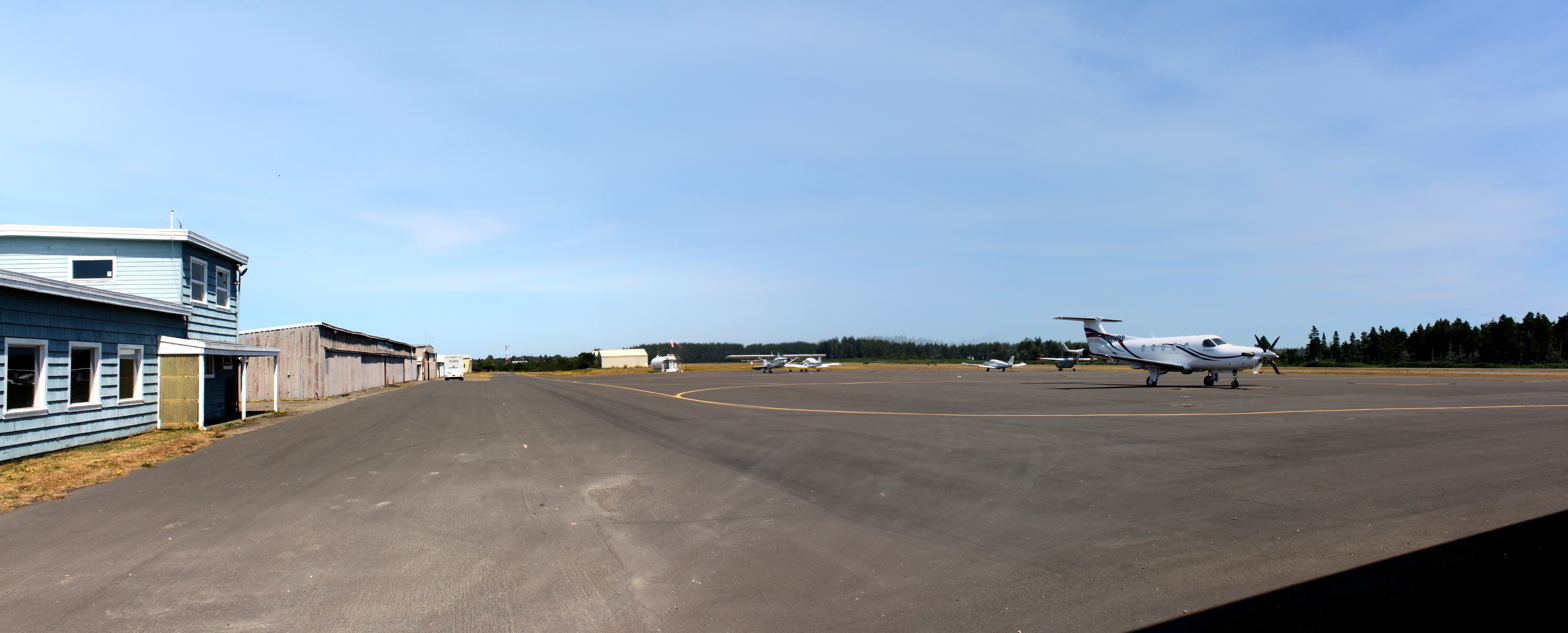
- IATA: BDY; ICAO: none; FAA LID: S05

Summary
- Airport type: Public
- Operator: Oregon Department of Aviation
- Location: Bandon, Oregon
- Elevation AMSL: 123 ft / 37 m
- Coordinates: 43°05′11.2600″N 124°24′28.31″W
- Interactive map of Bandon State Airport

Runways
Direction	Length		Surface
Direction	ft	m	Surface
16/34	3,601	1,098	Asphalt

Bandon State Airport (IATA: BDY, FAA LID: S05), is a public airport located two miles (3.2 km) southeast of the city of Bandon in Coos County, Oregon, United States. It has one asphalt runway, 16/34 that is 3,601 feet (1,098 m) long by 60 feet (18 m) wide and medium intensity runway edge lights.

The airport has a fixed-base operator, Bandon Aviation, LLC, that sells aviation gasoline and can provide major airframe and engine repairs.

The airport began operations in 1958, and had an average of 136 airport operations per week in the 12 months ending August 25, 2021.
