= Denmark, Oregon =

Unincorporated community in the state of Oregon, United States

- Unincorporated community
- Location within the state of Oregon Denmark (the United States)
- Coordinates: 42°53′26″N 124°27′45″W
- Country: United States
- State: Oregon
- County: Curry
- Elevation: 89 ft (27 m)
- Time zone: UTC-8 (Pacific (PST))
  - Summer (DST): UTC-7 (PDT)
- ZIP code: 97450
- Area codes: 458 and 541
- GNIS feature ID: 1119858

Denmark is an unincorporated community in Curry County, Oregon, United States. The community between Bandon and Port Orford where U.S. Route 101 crosses Willow Creek.

== History ==
Denmark was founded by first generation Danes who developed a profitable dairy industry in the area. Denmark post office was established in 1882. In 1915 the community had a sawmill, a cheese factory, a creamery, and a public school. In 1940 Denmark had a population of 96. Improvements to U.S. 101 bypassed the business district and the community went into decline. The post office closed in 1960. By the 1990s, the only business in Denmark was a store/gas station. In 2009 there was a drive-through espresso stand at the same location.

Denmark was the focus of a 2009 series of articles on Oregon Public Broadcasting (OPB) about climate change that coincided with the Copenhagen Summit in the country of Denmark.

== Climate ==
This region experiences warm and dry summers, with no average monthly temperatures above 71.6 °F (22.0 °C). According to the Köppen climate classification system, Denmark has a warm-summer Mediterranean climate, abbreviated "Csb" on climate maps.

Climate data for Denmark, OR
Month	Jan	Feb	Mar	Apr	May	Jun	Jul	Aug	Sep	Oct	Nov	Dec	Year
Record high °F (°C)	73 (23)	74 (23)	77 (25)	83 (28)	94 (34)	81 (27)	89 (32)	88 (31)	93 (34)	92 (33)	79 (26)	71 (22)	94 (34)
Mean daily maximum °F (°C)	55.8 (13.2)	56.4 (13.6)	57.2 (14.0)	59.2 (15.1)	63.4 (17.4)	66.1 (18.9)	70 (21)	71.3 (21.8)	70.5 (21.4)	65.6 (18.7)	59.3 (15.2)	55.6 (13.1)	62.5 (16.9)
Mean daily minimum °F (°C)	41 (5)	40 (4)	40.7 (4.8)	42 (6)	45.8 (7.7)	50 (10)	52.8 (11.6)	52.7 (11.5)	49.7 (9.8)	46 (8)	43.6 (6.4)	40.7 (4.8)	45.4 (7.4)
Record low °F (°C)	22 (−6)	22 (−6)	29 (−2)	30 (−1)	33 (1)	40 (4)	42 (6)	41 (5)	40 (4)	29 (−2)	28 (−2)	16 (−9)	16 (−9)
Average precipitation inches (mm)	11.62 (295)	9.34 (237)	9.65 (245)	5.87 (149)	3.79 (96)	1.83 (46)	0.45 (11)	0.86 (22)	1.71 (43)	4.75 (121)	10.83 (275)	12.1 (310)	72.8 (1,850)
Average precipitation days	19	16	18	15	12	8	3	4	6	11	18	19	149
