= Portland Downtown Heliport =

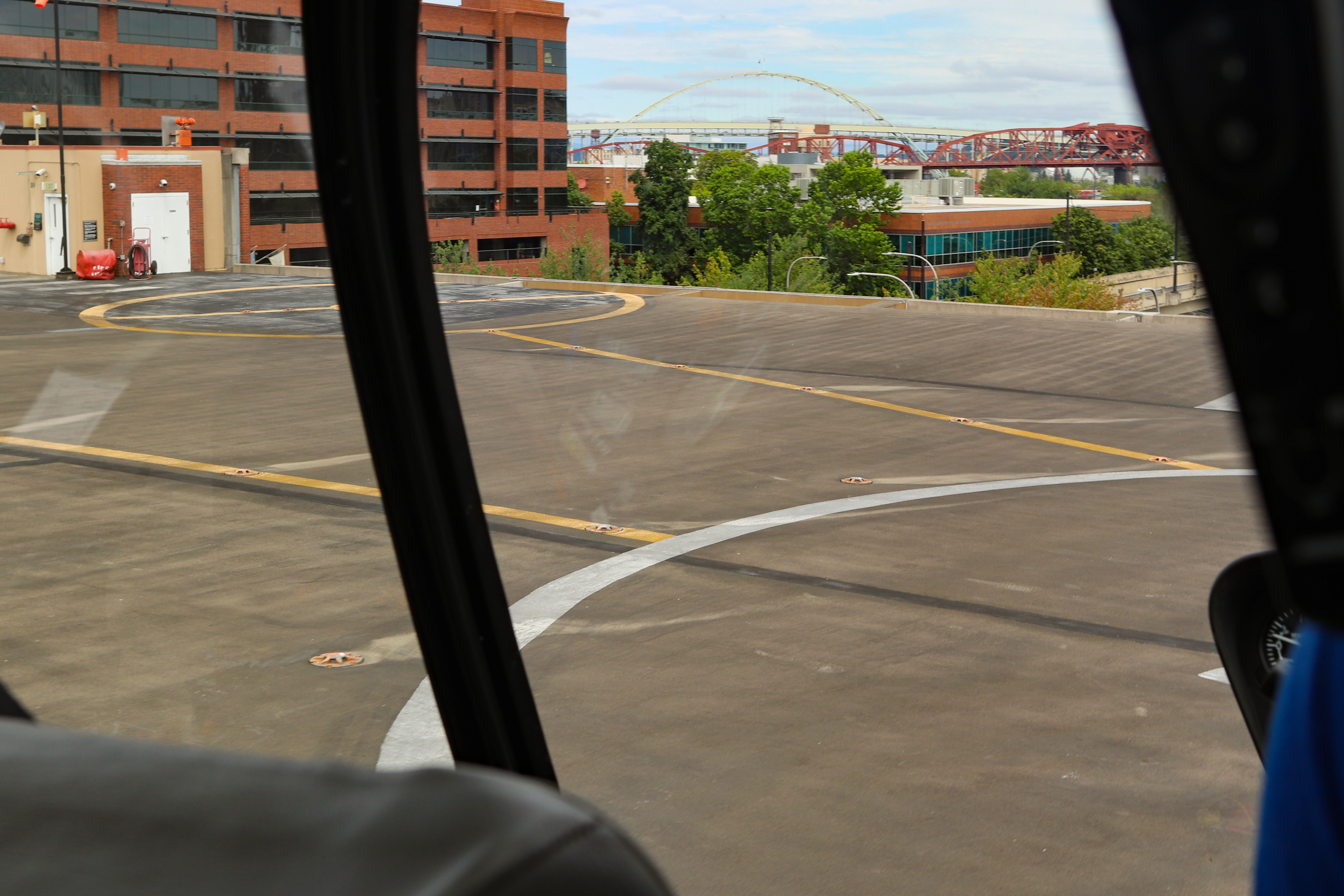
- Helipad, viewed from helicopter
- IATA: none; ICAO: none; FAA LID: 61J

Summary
- Airport type: Public
- Operator: City of Portland
- Location: Portland, Oregon
- Elevation AMSL: 78 ft (24 m)
- Coordinates: 45°31′31.0000″N 122°40′15.34″W
- Interactive map of Portland Downtown Heliport

Helipads
Number	Length		Surface
Number	ft	m	Surface
H1	80	24	Concrete

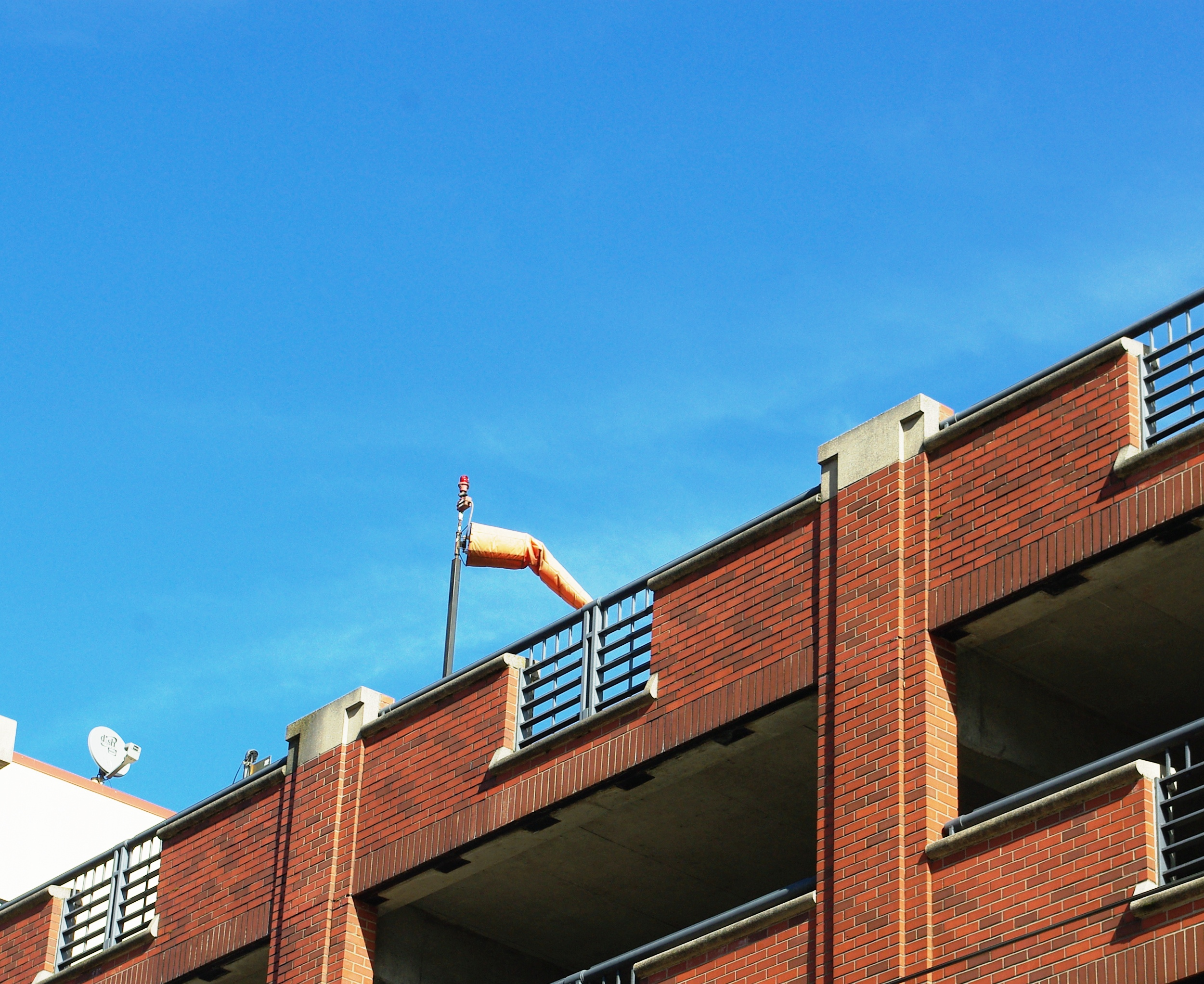
Helipad, viewed from street

Portland Downtown Heliport (FAA LID: 61J) was a public heliport located in the Old Town Chinatown neighborhood in the northwest section of the city of Portland, Multnomah County, Oregon, United States. It occupied the roof of a 1989 parking garage located at the intersection of NW Naito Parkway and NW Davis Street, not far from the Steel Bridge over the Willamette River.

The Downtown Heliport closed in early 2025, and had the distinction of being Oregon's only public-use heliport. It averaged up to 99 aircraft operations per week.
