= Owyhee, Oregon =

Unincorporated community in the state of Oregon, United States

- Unincorporated community
- Location within Oregon Location within the United States
- Coordinates: 43°47′42″N 117°03′19″W
- Country: United States
- State: Oregon
- County: Malheur
- Elevation: 2,195 ft (669 m)
- Time zone: UTC-7 (Mountain (MST))
  - Summer (DST): UTC-6 (MDT)
- Area code: 541
- GNIS feature ID: 1136607

Owyhee is an unincorporated community in Malheur County, Oregon, in the United States. It lies along Oregon Route 201 between Adrian and Nyssa, near the confluence of the Owyhee and Snake rivers.

According to Oregon Geographic Names, the community is named after the river, which was likely named after Hawaii, known as Owyhee before 1800. In 1826, two Hawaiians taking part in the second expedition of Peter Skene Ogden to Snake River country were killed by Snake Indians. It is probable that the river was named in recognition of these two men.
