= Oregon Department of Aviation =

- Official logo

Agency overview
- Preceding agency: Oregon Division of Aeronautics
- Jurisdiction: Oregon
- Headquarters: Salem, Oregon
- Employees: 16
- Minister responsible: Tina Kotek, Governor of Oregon
- Agency executive: Kenji Sugahara, Director
- Parent agency: State Aviation Board
- Website: www.oregon.gov/Aviation

The Oregon Department of Aviation (ODAV) is an agency of the government of the U.S. state of Oregon chiefly responsible for matters relating to the continuing development of aviation as part of the state's transportation system, and the safety of its airways. In addition to operating the 28 airports owned by the State of Oregon, the department licenses more than 450 public or private airports, heliports and landing areas, and registers all pilots and non-military aircraft based within the state. Its activities include overseeing aviation system planning, providing administrative and technical support for community airport planning and development, administering an airport pavement maintenance program, providing small community aviation grants, and conducting aviation and public education programs.

== History ==
The agency's history dates back to 1921 when the Oregon Legislative Assembly created the Oregon State Board of Aeronautics, its predecessor, and the first governmental agency in the United States to regulate aircraft and pilots. In the 1940s Aeronautics was given the responsibility to establish and maintain a program of Air Search and Rescue - Air SAR - following a private plane accident that killed Governor Earl Snell, Secretary of State Robert S. Farrell, Jr. and Senate President Marshall E. Cornett. The 1970s saw the establishment of the Oregon Department of Transportation ODOT; the Aeronautics Board was dissolved, and the Oregon Aeronautics Division was created within the new agency. In 1994, the responsibility of Air SAR was transferred to the Oregon State Police and the Office of Emergency Management. In 1999, the Oregon Legislative Assembly passed legislation granting Aeronautics independent agency status.

== Airports ==
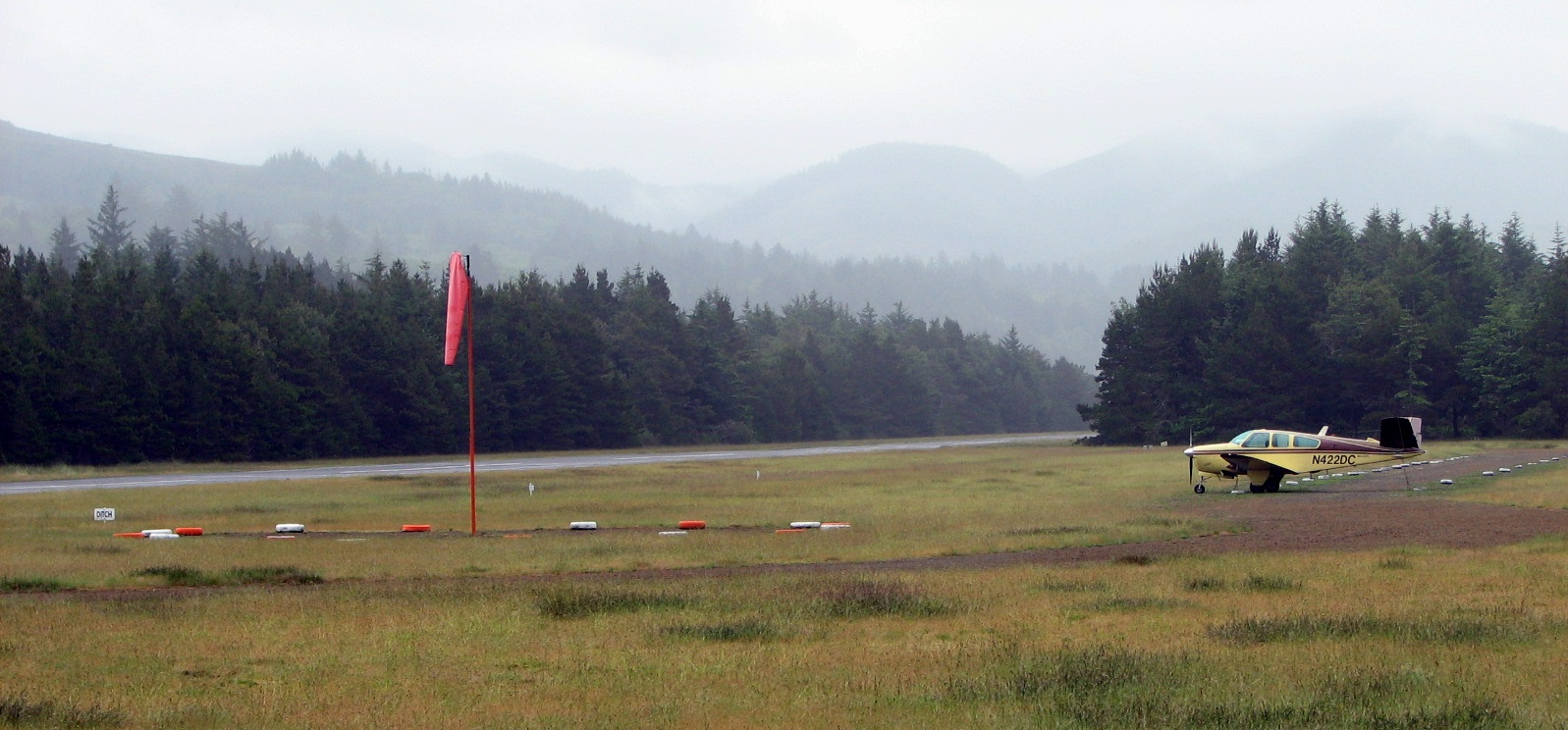
The Nehalem Bay State Airport on a still morning.

The following airports are owned or operated by the Oregon Department of Aviation:

- Alkali Lake State Airport
- Aurora State Airport - Wes Lematta Field
- Bandon State Airport
- Cape Blanco State Airport
- Cascade Locks State Airport*
- Chiloquin State Airport
- Condon State Airport - Pauling Field
- Cottage Grove State Airport - Jim Wright Field
- Crescent Lake State Airport*
- Independence State Airport
- Joseph State Airport
- Lakeside State Airport
- Lebanon State Airport
- McDermitt State Airport
- McKenzie Bridge State Airport*
- Mulino State Airport
- Nehalem Bay State Airport
- Oakridge State Airport
- Owyhee Reservoir State Airport*
- Pacific City State Airport*
- Pinehurst State Airport*
- Prospect State Airport
- Rome State Airport
- Santiam Junction State Airport*
- Siletz Bay State Airport
- Toketee State Airport
- Toledo State Airport*
- Wakonda Beach State Airport*
- Wasco State Airport

== State Warning Airports ==
Of the 28 airports that ODAV manages nine have been designated by the Department as Warning Airports. These airports have non-standard lengths or require special pilot knowledge prior to flying in. The department encourages all aviators to contact them to receive a briefing on the airport's status prior to flying to these fields.

== See also ==
- Oregon Department of Transportation
