= Chiloquin State Airport =

Airport in Oregon, United States

- IATA: CHZ; ICAO: none; FAA LID: 2S7

Summary
- Airport type: Public
- Owner: Oregon Department of Aviation
- Serves: Chiloquin, Oregon
- Elevation AMSL: 4,221 ft (1,287 m)
- Coordinates: 42°34′59″N 121°52′34″W

Map
- Location of airport in Oregon

Runways
Direction	Length		Surface
Direction	ft	m	Surface
17/35	3,749	1,143	Asphalt

Statistics (2019)
- Aircraft operations (year ending 6/11/2019): 3,500
- Based aircraft: 7
- Source: Federal Aviation Administration

Chiloquin State Airport (IATA: CHZ, FAA LID: 2S7) is a public use airport located one nautical mile (2 km) west of the central business district of Chiloquin, a city in Klamath County, Oregon, United States. The airport was established in 1946 by the City of Chiloquin and ownership was transferred in 1960 to the State of Oregon. It is included in the National Plan of Integrated Airport Systems for 2011–2015, which categorized it as a general aviation facility.

== Facilities and aircraft ==
Chiloquin State Airport covers an area of 115 acres (47 ha) at an elevation of 4,221 feet (1,287 m) above mean sea level. It has one runway designated 17/35 with an asphalt surface measuring 3,749 by 60 feet (1,143 x 18 m).

For the 12-month period ending June 11, 2019, the airport had 3,500 aircraft operations, an average of 67 per week: 86% general aviation and 14% air taxi. At that time there were 7 aircraft based at this airport, all single-engine.
