= Willamette Escarpment =

Escarpment in Portland, Oregon, U.S.

- Escarpment
- Location in Portland, Oregon
- Coordinates: 45.5735°N 122.7043°W (North Escarpment); 45.4745°N 122.6529°W (South Escarpment)
- Location: Portland, Oregon, U.S.

The Willamette Escarpment is an escarpment that runs along the east bank of the Willamette River in Portland, Oregon, United States. The escarpment comprises two distinct sections: a 200-acre (81 ha) North Escarpment Unit, which extends from the Fremont Bridge northwest to the St. Johns Bridge, and a 75-acre (30 ha) South Escarpment Unit, which extends from the Sellwood Bridge north to the Ross Island Bridge.

== Description ==
=== North Escarpment ===
The North Willamette Escarpment, also known as the Overlook Bluffs or Willamette Bluff, is composed of several areas managed by Portland Parks & Recreation (PP&R). The bluff also includes private properties, land owned by the University of Portland, and areas in the jurisdiction of other government entities such as the Port of Portland.

The bluff rises abruptly to the west of the Fremont Bridge, and extends northwest above Union Pacific's Albina rail yard. The bluff then stretches above the Swan Island Industrial Park before wrapping around the University of Portland campus. The section of bluff above Mocks Bottom is known as Mocks Crest (45°34′30″N 122°42′40″W), while the section bordering the University of Portland is known as Waud Bluff (45°34′13″N 122°43′44″W). A trail near Waud Bluff allows pedestrians and cyclists to access the industrial area below. Mocks Crest Park and Overlook Park are located on the Overlook Bluff.

Continuing northwest, the bluff rises over land owned by the University of Portland before extending above two undeveloped areas on either side of BNSF Railway Bridge 5.1. Southeast of the railroad bridge is the McCormick & Baxter Superfund site. Northwest of the railroad bridge is Willamette Cove, a 27-acre (11 ha) parcel of land owned by Metro that was formerly used for industrial purposes.

=== South Escarpment ===
A major feature of the South Escarpment Unit (45°28′28″N 122°39′10″W) is the Oaks Bottom Wildlife Refuge, a 170-acre (69 ha) wetland at the base of the escarpment managed by Portland Parks & Recreation. The unit also contains land managed by Metro and the State of Oregon, along with several privately owned properties.

== History and ecology ==
According to Portland Parks & Recreation, the Willamette Escarpment formed as a result of the Missoula Floods approximately 15,000 years ago. Before the arrival of European settlers in Oregon in the mid-1800s, the escarpment was covered with Oregon white oak, Pacific madrone, and native grasses. After Portland was incorporated in 1851, logging, land clearing, and fire suppression began to degrade the natural environment of the escarpment. Invasive plants such as Himalayan blackberries and Scotch broom were introduced during this time, smothering the oaks and other indigenous plants.

One consequence of the introduction of invasive weeds has been the increased risk of forest fire. Although fires occurred before the introduction of invasive weeds—Native Americans regularly started fires to control undergrowth and favor forest habitats—risk of fire is now higher because invasive weeds grow faster and are more flammable than native plants.

On August 8, 2001, a brush fire started near Union Pacific railroad tracks at the base of the north escarpment. Winds quickly spread the flames up the bluff and extended the blaze for nearly 2 miles (3.2 km), making it one of the worst urban wildfires in Portland's history. No people were injured by the fire, although several homes were scorched. Mike Houck, an urban naturalist for the Audubon Society of Portland, noted that the areas of the bluff that burned most intensely were those covered with invasive weeds, while patches covered with native vegetation sustained little to no burn damage.

Much of the vegetation on the bluff was burned away, leading to concerns about erosion. The city approved funding to seed the bluff with native grasses in order to prevent landslides; the newly replanted bluff was able to withstand winter rains. City officials suspected sparks from a passing Union Pacific freight train of lighting the fire, and submitted a $323,000 reimbursement claim to the railroad for the cost of fighting the fire and the subsequent erosion control efforts. The railroad ultimately paid $199,731 to the city to help pay for replanting vegetation, but refused to cover the expense of extinguishing the fire.

On August 20, 2002, a fire again started at the railroad tracks at the base of the bluff. The fire spread over a much smaller distance, only covering 6 acres (2.4 ha). A Portland Fire Bureau spokesman said this was due to the lack of Himalayan blackberry bushes and dry weeds that covered the bluff the year prior.

In 2007, the city received a $945,000 grant from the Federal Emergency Management Agency to improve the ecological health of the Willamette Escarpment and reduce the risk of fire. The funding also went towards reducing fire risk in Forest Park and Powell Butte.
