= KHIO =

KHIO may refer to:

- The ICAO code for Hillsboro Airport in Hillsboro, Oregon, United States
- Kunsthøgskolen i Oslo (KHiO), the Oslo National Academy of the Arts
