= Mock's Bottom =

Reclaimed wetland in Portland, Oregon, U.S.

- Lowlands
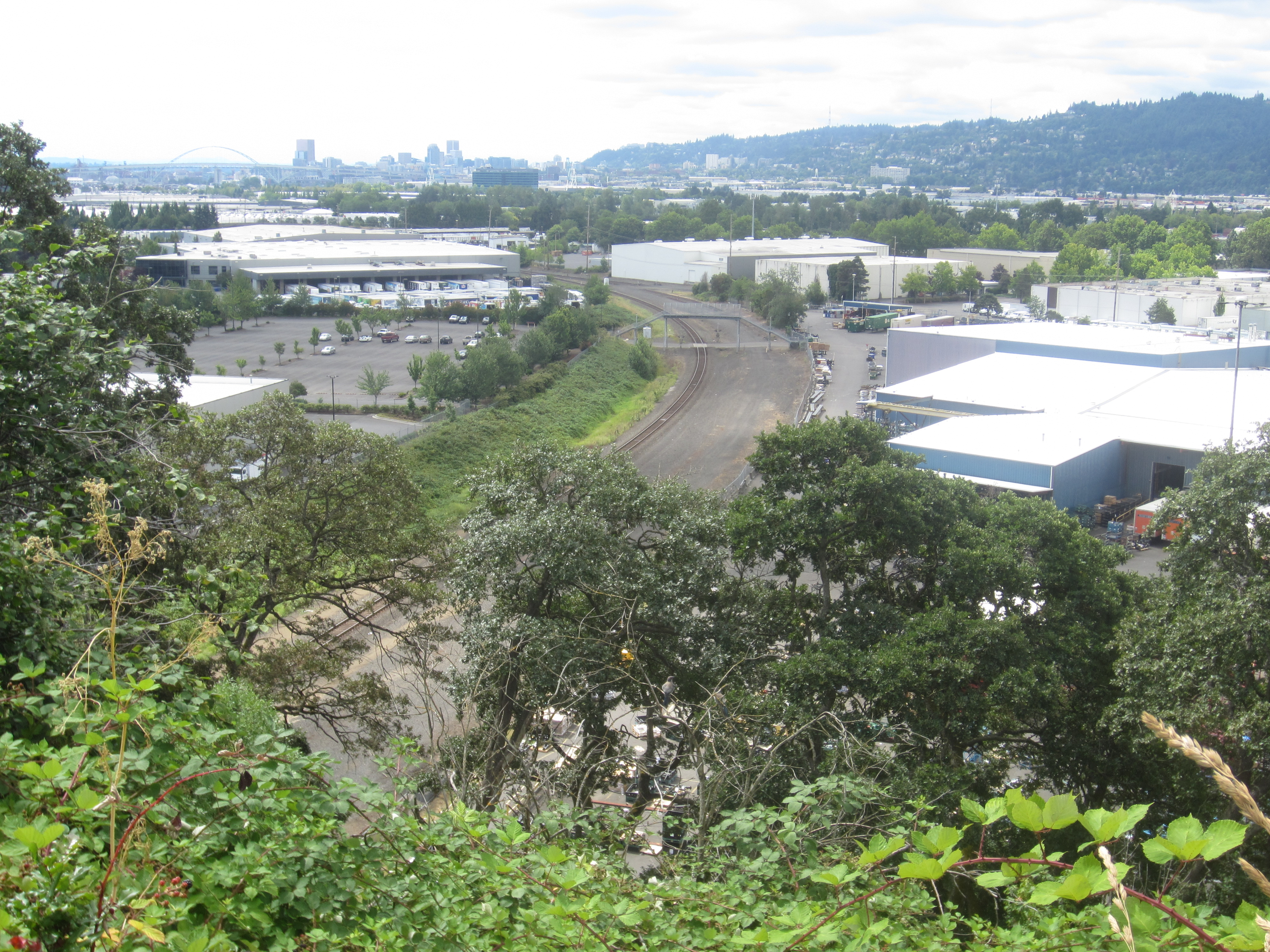
- View of part of the industrial park from Mock's Crest, 2019

- Location in Portland, Oregon
- Coordinates: 45°34′13″N 122°42′18″W
- Location: Portland, Oregon, U.S.
- Elevation: 13 m (43 ft)

Mock's Bottom (also Mocks Bottom) is a lowland northeast of Swan Island in Portland, Oregon, United States. It acquired its name from Henry Mock, who settled a donation land claim in the area with his family in 1852. Mock's Crest (45°34′30″N 122°42′40″W), named for Henry Mock's son John Mock, is a bluff that overlooks the lowland.

Mock's Bottom existed as a wetland under natural conditions. In 1920, a committee appointed by Portland mayor George L. Baker recommended that Mock's Bottom be filled for future industrial development. At the time, a large portion of Mock's Bottom was owned by private interests, and was considered to be one of the best duck hunting areas in Portland.

The Port of Portland purchased Mock's Bottom from Multnomah County in 1958. In 1980, the Port reached an agreement with the City of Portland whereby 177 acres (72 ha) of Mock's Bottom would be developed into industrial land. Port officials designated the project the "Mocks Landing Industrial Park", as they felt "bottom" was not dignified. The first land sale at the industrial park was completed in May 1981, and dredging was nearly completed by January 1982.

== See also ==
- John Mock House, located on Mock's Crest
