= McMinnville Municipal Airport =

Airport in Oregon, United States

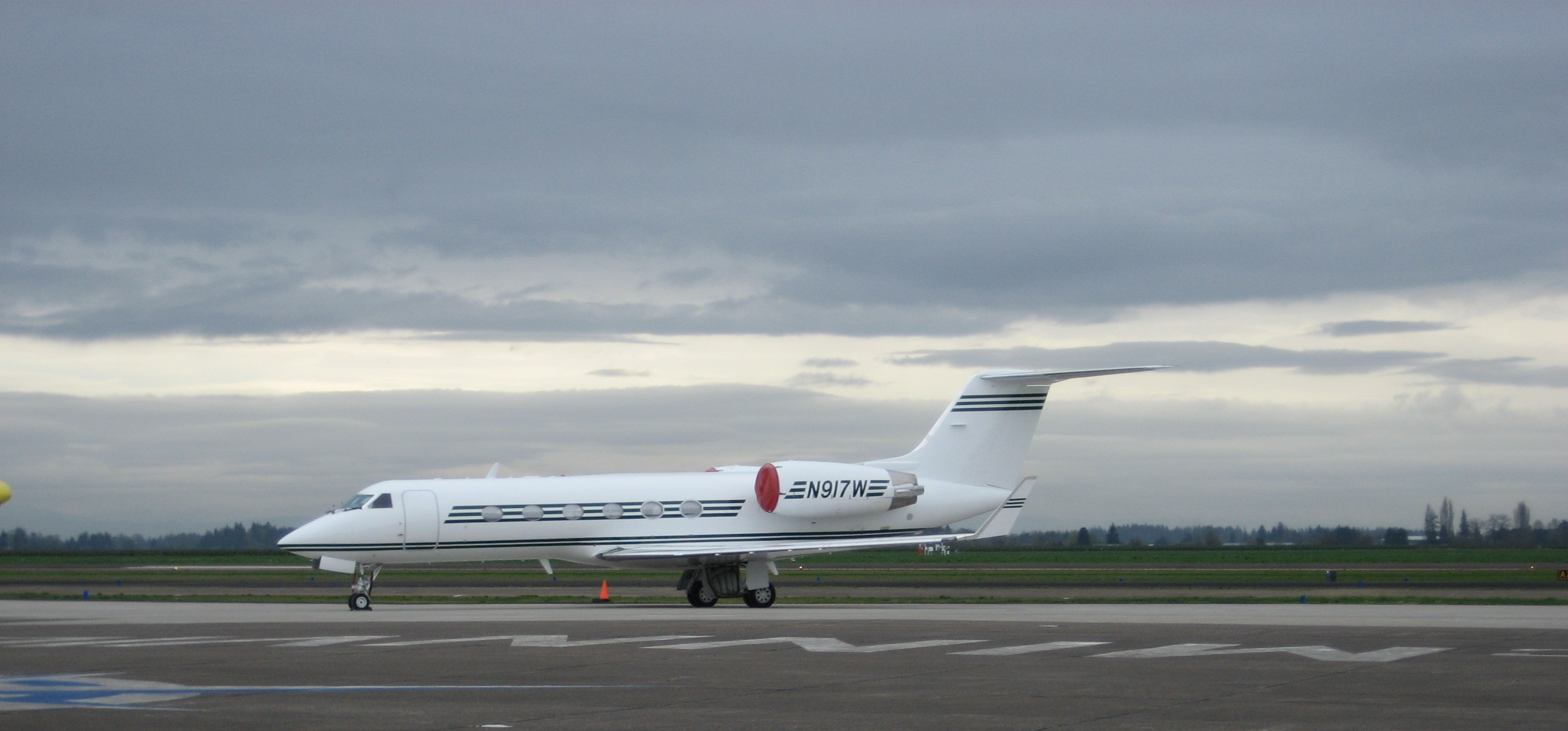
- IATA: none; ICAO: KMMV; FAA LID: MMV

Summary
- Airport type: Public
- Owner: City of McMinnville
- Serves: McMinnville, Oregon
- Elevation AMSL: 163 ft / 50 m
- Coordinates: 45°11′40″N 123°08′10″W
- Interactive map of McMinnville Municipal Airport

Runways
Direction	Length		Surface
Direction	ft	m	Surface
4/22	5,420	1,652	Asphalt
17/35	4,340	1,323	Asphalt

Statistics (2021)
- Aircraft operations (year ending 9/20/2021): 63,500
- Based aircraft: 123
- Source: Federal Aviation Administration

McMinnville Municipal Airport (ICAO: KMMV, FAA LID: MMV) is three miles southeast of McMinnville, in Yamhill County, Oregon. The FAA's National Plan of Integrated Airport Systems for 2009–2013 categorized it as a general aviation facility. It is across Oregon Route 18 from the Evergreen Aviation & Space Museum, home to the Hughes H-4 Hercules Spruce Goose flying boat.

Many U.S. airports use the same three-letter location identifier for the FAA and IATA, but this airport is MMV according to the FAA and has no IATA code.

West Coast Airlines Douglas DC-3s served McMinnville for several years commencing in 1947.

== Facilities ==
The airport covers 650 acres (260 ha) at an elevation of 163 feet (50 m). It has two asphalt runways: 4/22 is 5,420 by 150 feet (1,652 x 46 m) and 17/35 is 4,340 by 75 feet (1,323 x 23 m).

In the year ending September 20, 2021, the airport had 63,500 aircraft operations, average 174 per day: 98% general aviation and 2% military. 123 aircraft were then based at the airport: 94 single-engine, 7 multi-engine, 3 jet, 15 helicopter and 4 glider.

== Oregon International Air Show ==
In September 2019, the Oregon International Air Show was held at the McMinnville Airport. The air show is normally held at the Hillsboro Airport, however, there was runway construction taking place at the time.

== See also ==
- Willamette Valley Medical Center
