= Hillsboro Airport =

Portland–Hillsboro Airport
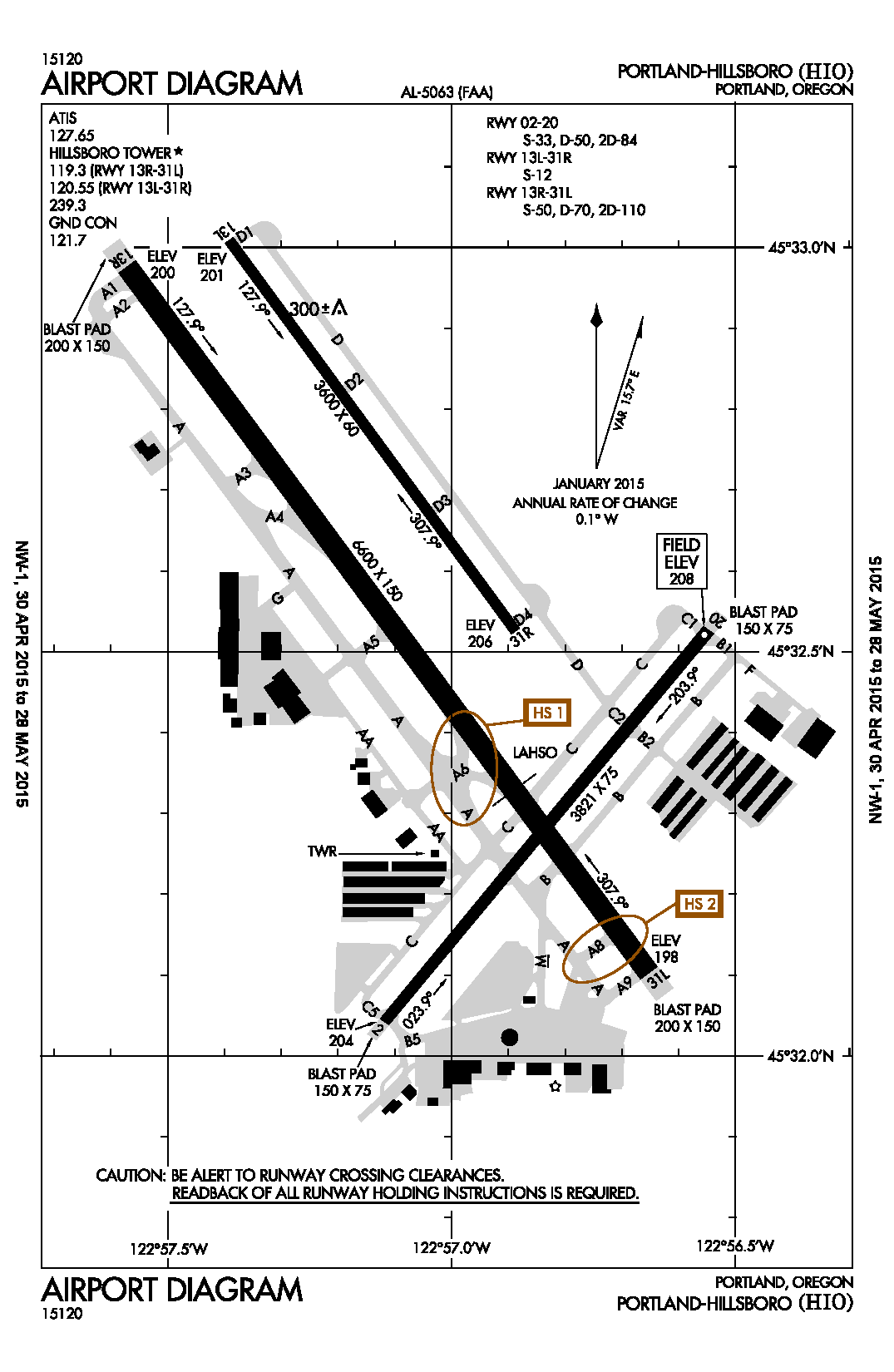
- IATA: HIO; ICAO: KHIO

Summary
- Airport type: Public
- Operator: Port of Portland
- Location: Hillsboro, Oregon
- Elevation AMSL: 208 ft (63 m)
- Coordinates: 45°32′25.418″N 122°56′59.37″W
- Website: Hillsboro Airport

Map
- Location of airport in Oregon / United States HIO (the United States)

Runways
Direction	Length		Surface
Direction	ft	m	Surface
13R/31L	6,600	2,012	Asphalt
2/20	3,820	1,164	Asphalt
13L/31R	3,600	1,097	Asphalt

Statistics (2020)
- Aircraft operations (year ending 7/13/2020): 253,847
- Based aircraft: 258
- Source: Federal Aviation Administration

Hillsboro Airport (IATA: HIO, ICAO: KHIO), also known as Portland–Hillsboro Airport, is a corporate, general aviation, and flight-training airport serving the city of Hillsboro, in Washington County, Oregon, United States as well as a large amount of private/charter and general aviation traffic into and out of the greater Portland area. It is one of three airports in the Portland, Oregon, metropolitan area owned and operated by the Port of Portland. Established in 1928, it is Oregon's second busiest airport (in terms of total aircraft operations) at over 200,000 operations annually. HIO covers 900 acres (360 ha) and has three runways.

Located in the north-central area of Hillsboro, and west of Portland, it hosts the annual Oregon International Air Show. The airport includes a Federal Aviation Administration control tower, three paved runways, hangars, fueling facilities, and a small passenger terminal. Hillsboro Airport is also a port of entry, with a single-person U.S. Customs and Border Protection office.

== History ==
Hillsboro airport goes back to 1928. Dr. Elmer H. Smith purchased 100 acres (40 ha) of land near the town to use as an airport, as he owned the first airplane in town. In the early 1930s, after Smith died, the city purchased the airport for $7,500 and received a federal grant to improve the facilities. They built two runways, one 3,000 feet (910 m) long and the other 2,800 feet (850 m).

In July 1936, Richard Evelyn Byrd's "Stars And Stripes" Fairchild FC-2 aircraft used to explore the South Pole was displayed at the airport. With the outbreak of World War II in 1941, the city received federal money again, and the city approved local financing to improve the airport again, with the costs of the improvements totaling around $600,000.

During and after flooding along the Columbia River in 1948, the Hillsboro facility was used by some commercial operators due to the closure of then Portland-Columbia Airport (now Portland International), which lies along the river. The three commercial carriers at Hillsboro were Coastal Airways, Columbia Air Cargo, and General Air Cargo. This was the flooding that wiped out the city of Vanport, and due to that disaster relief supplies were flown into the Portland area by the United States Air Force using the Hillsboro Airport.

The field was also considered as a possible naval air station in 1946 and again in 1955, but was eventually rejected by the Navy. In early 1960 several companies were located at the airport, including Tektron Instruments and Georgia Pacific.

In 1964, the Hillsboro City Council made an official request to the Port of Portland to take over ownership of the airport. The facility had deteriorated due to inadequate funding, and the Port agreed to take over ownership after some legal wrangling in 1965.

On August 28, 1966, an air traffic control tower was opened after construction costs of $400,000 with staffing by the FAA. In April 1975 the current main terminal that includes offices and a restaurant opened, followed by the opening of the new 6,300-foot (1,900 m) runway on September 1, 1976.

The airport received scheduled regular airline service during the late 1970s, on Farwest Airlines to Boeing Field in Seattle, Washington, as well as to Medford and North Bend/Coos Bay airports.

In 1989, customs call out service was added to allow international business flights at the airport after lobbying by Congressman Les AuCoin and business leaders. After advance notice, customs inspectors from Portland would be sent to the airport to process the passengers.

Hillsboro Airport is often mentioned as a reliever airport for Portland International Airport. In 1999, Portland City Council member Dan Saltzman suggested expanding the Hillsboro Airport to relieve pressure on the busy Portland International Airport. This was during a time when the Port of Portland was discussing building a new larger airport or possibly adding a third runway to PDX to handle growing demand for air travel and air cargo. Saltzman suggested shifting some commercial flights to Hillsboro, while shifting some cargo flights there had previously been discussed.

As of 2006, the Port of Portland planned to spend $134 million through 2025 to improve the Hillsboro facility. Plans call for a third runway, increased hangar space, and additional automobile parking on-site, among other items. Construction on the third runway was to begin as early as 2010, but legal challenges put the plan on hold. In 2007, a staffed customs office was added to the airport. Paid for by funds generated by a user-fee association, this allowed the airport to continue as a port of entry, and removed the need for a Customs officer to travel from Portland International Airport.

The airport handled 259,263 flights in 2008, surpassing Portland International in this category. In 2009, the airport received a grant from the U.S. Department of Transportation to expand taxiways as part of the airport's master plan. President Barack Obama landed at the airport in Marine One in February 2011 as part of a visit to nearby Intel. The Port spent $9 million to repave the 2/20 runway and combined two taxiways into a single one in 2013. Construction started on the third runway in June 2014. Nike founder Phil Knight built a personal hangar at the airport next to the Nike hangar in 2014, while Global Aviation added a new hangar that same year. The third runway was eventually built, opening in April 2015.

On July 3, 2017 a man climbed a perimeter fence near Hillsboro Aero Academy and attempted to steal a Robinson R22 helicopter. After a brief chase with police he was fatally shot.

As of July 2024, Intel Air Shuttle operates corporate flights to San Jose and Phoenix from Hillsboro Airport.

== Operations ==
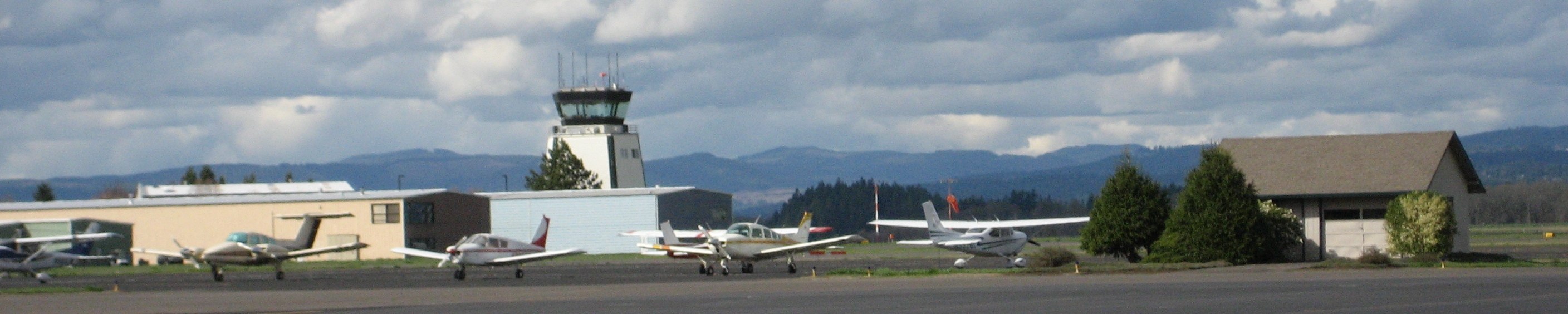
Planes and the control tower

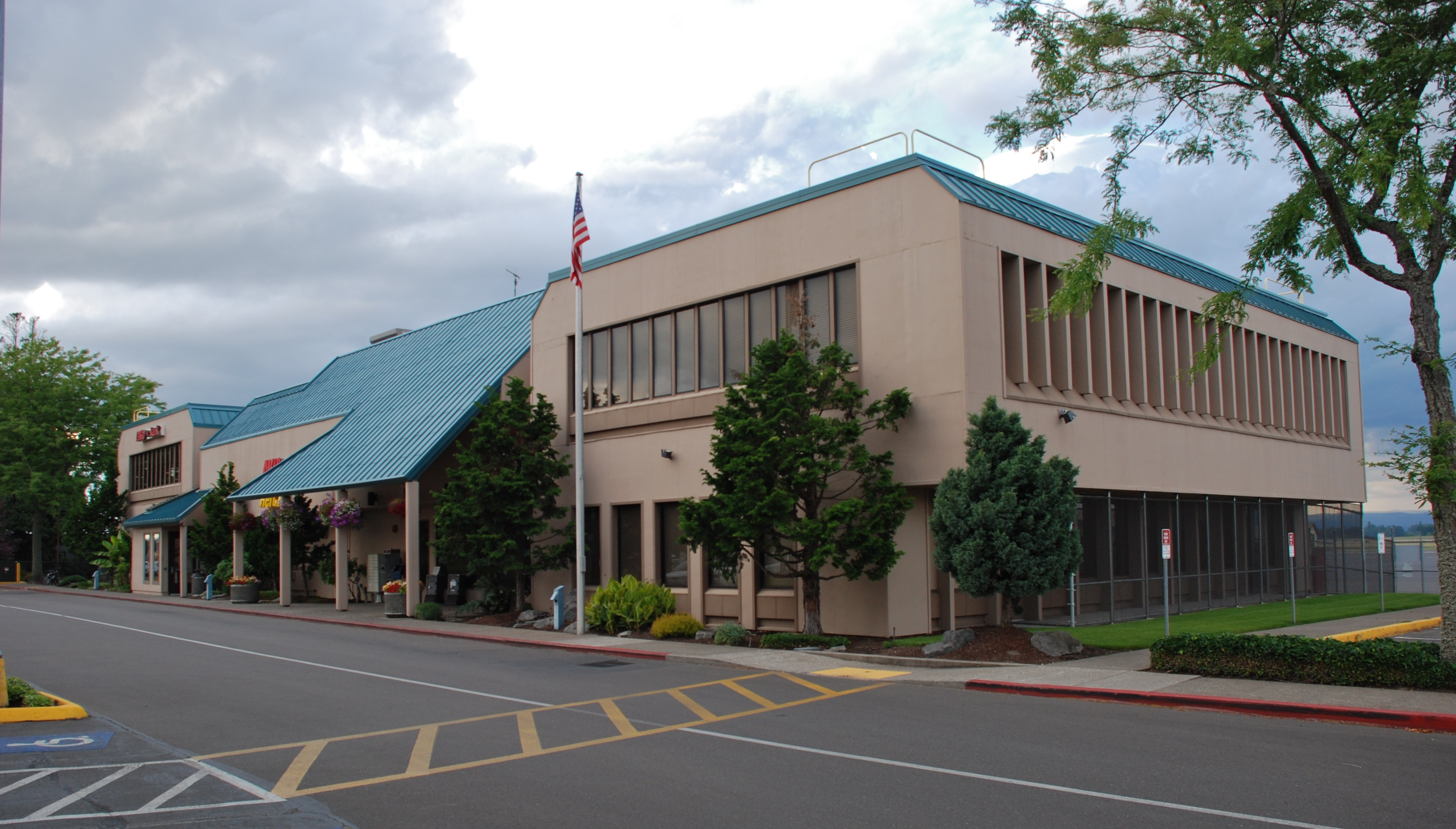
Terminal building

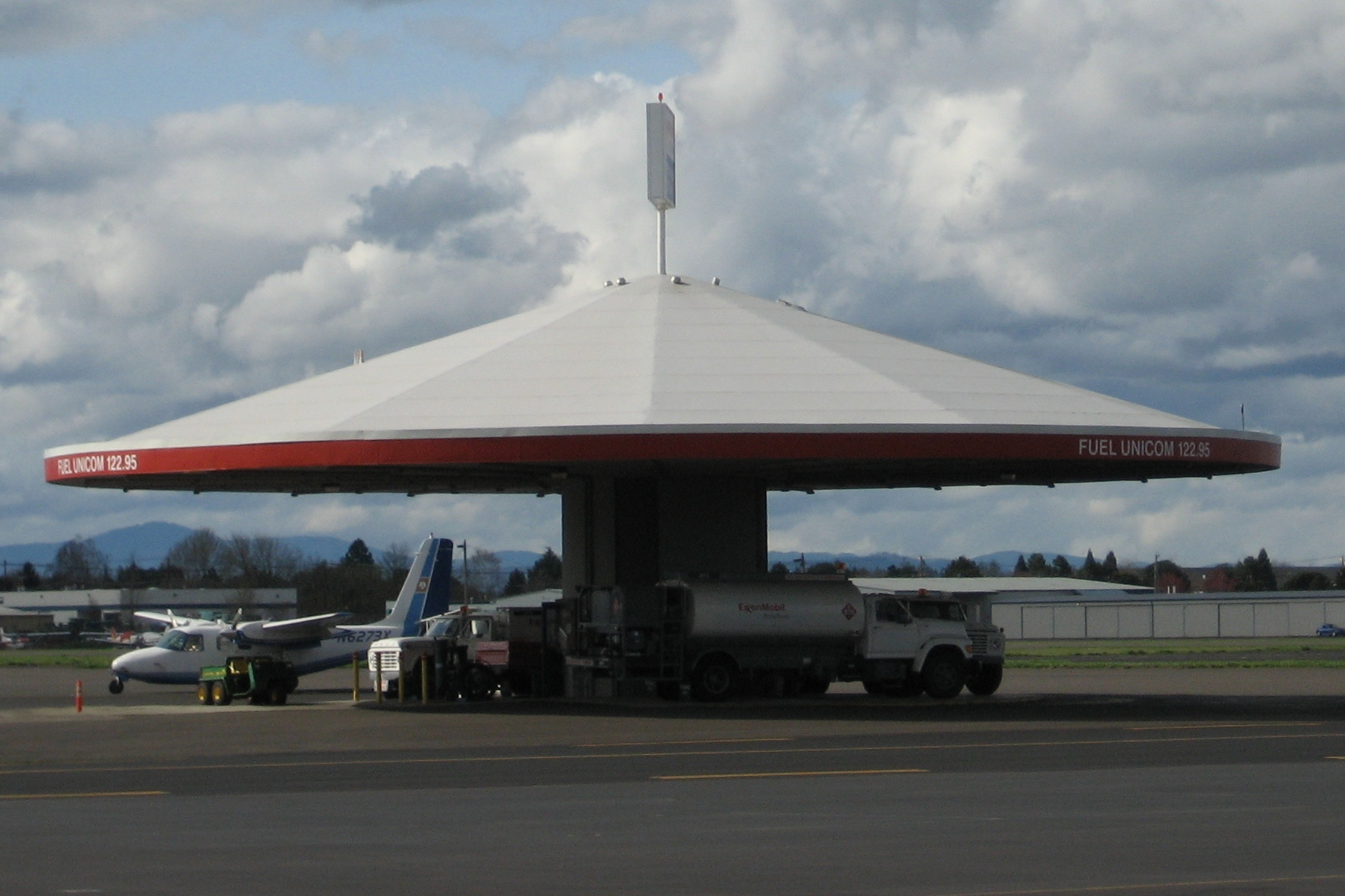
Now retired refueling center at the airport, known as "the mushroom"

Located in Portland's western and Washington County suburbs, Hillsboro Airport is connected to the metropolitan area by TriMet buses and the MAX Blue and Red lines' Hillsboro Airport/Fairgrounds station. The transit station is located to the south of the airport, across the Westside Commons (formerly the Washington County Fairgrounds). The primary public access point, including to the terminal building, is from Cornell Road, on the south side of the airport.

Facilities include a 6,600-foot (2,000 m) runway (Rwy 13R/31L), a 3,820-foot (1,160 m) runway (rwy 2/20), a 3,600-foot (1,100 m) runway (rwy 13L/31R), and an FAA control tower. Runway 13R/31L is ILS- and PAPI-equipped. The air traffic control tower, a 48 feet 10 inches (14.88 m) standard Type O design (by I. M. Pei, pentagonal steel tower with pentagonal aluminum cab), is staffed from 6 a.m. to 10 p.m. local time. The tower receives a radar feed from the Falls City ARSR to supplement radio communication and binoculars to locate aircraft in its airspace. The small main terminal includes two rental car companies, airport offices, and a waiting area for the passengers flying on the daily Intel charter flights. There is also a single-officer-staffed U.S. Customs and Border Protection office to process international flights. Previously, the building was the home of KUIK-AM radio station and a restaurant on the top floor.

The airport was originally Hillsboro's municipal airport, which the Port of Portland bought in 1966. It has been developed to support all forms of general aviation and is home to four fixed-base operator (FBOs). Many people, including celebrities, politicians and sports-stars choose to use Hillsboro for its ease and discreetness. The airport is also a hub for many major local corporations, including Nike, Teufel Nursery, and Intel. The predominant activity at the airport is flight training, accounting for more than half of the overall operations. It was formerly the base of operation for the Life Flight Network, the medical evacuation provider for the region. Operated by Oregon Health & Science University, Legacy Health System, and Providence Health System, the non-profit service owns one helicopter and two fixed-wing aircraft.

Hillsboro Airport is also home to the Washington County Composite Squadron of the U.S. Civil Air Patrol.

As of July 2020, the airport handled over 253,000 takeoffs and landings. It is Oregon's second-busiest airport overall after Portland International, and is the largest general aviation airport in the state. The annual Oregon International Air Show takes place at Hillsboro Airport.

=== Training ===
- ATP Flight School
- Hillsboro Aero Academy

== Incidents ==
- On May 2, 1986, Horizon Air Flight 2318, a Fairchild Swearingen Metroliner with 15 passengers and crew was hijacked en route from Rogue Valley International-Medford Airport to Portland International Airport, with the pilot able to convince the hijacker to allow the plane to land at HIO where the hijacker was arrested. There were no injuries.
- A Hawker Hunter jet (N58MX) flown by pilot Robert "Bob" Guilford, crashed after takeoff while leaving the Oregon International Air Show on July 16, 2006. Four houses were damaged by fire and the pilot died on impact, but there were no casualties on the ground. The jet had been on static display at the show, and was not an aerial performer.
- On February 11, 2022, a Cessna 205 landed safely after suffering a complete engine failure during a flight from Seattle to Sacramento. The emergency descent and air traffic control exchanges were captured on the pilot's cockpit-mounted GoPro camera.
- On October 3, 2023, a Piper Seminole owned by Hillsboro Aero Academy crashed shortly after takeoff from Hillsboro Airport during a training flight. The crash occurred in the 1900 block of North Cedar Street in Newberg, Oregon, killing two of the three occupants.

== See also ==
- Pearson Field
- Portland-Mulino Airport
- Portland-Troutdale Airport
