= Oregon International Air Show =

Air Show in Oregon, United States

- Status: Active
- Genre: Air Shows & Events
- Frequency: Annually
- Venue: Hillsboro Airport; McMinnville Municipal Airport
- Country: United States
- Years active: 32 Years
- Inaugurated: June 11–12, 1988
- Previous event: September 20–22, 2019
- Next event: 17–19 May 2024 (Hillsboro) & August 31-September 3, 2024 (McMinnville)
- Participants: 1,000+ volunteers
- Attendance: ~55,000 (2018)
- Major events: Friday Night Fireworks, Aerobatic Performers, Military Performers, Fly-Bys, Static Displays
- Leader: Bill Braack
- Sponsor: Stoller Family Estate, Xenium HR, Express Employment Professionals
- Website: oregonairshow.com

The Oregon International Air Show - formerly the "Portland Rose Festival Air Show" - is an annual event held in Oregon, United States. The event began in 1988, and has an average annual attendance of 55,000.

It is one of the largest civilian air shows on the West Coast of the United States. The Air Show features military and civilian aircraft from the United States and Canada, and on occasion, military and civilian aircraft from other countries such as Britain, France, and Russia.

As of 2020, the Air Show has given back more than $3.3M to over 500 organizations since 1988.

== History ==
Former Navy pilot, Jim Osborne, was the chairman of the Rose Festival Navy Committee and envisioned a full-scale airshow as part of the Portland Rose Festival. After the Rose Festival Association gave him the green light, he rounded up the top aerobatic acts in the country and enlisted the help of the U.S. Navy Recruiting to request the Blue Angels to headline the first show in 1988. The show was originally only a two-day public event (Saturday and Sunday only) with Friday being the exclusive "Arrival Day" for special needs children and their chaperones. Sales topped over $100,000 in its first year, according to James Cox (chairman at that time), making it an instant hit in the Portland area.

The 1989 event - held in June - drew approximately 125,000 spectators. The show featured an Oregon National Guard F-4 Phantom 5-ship as a farewell tribute to the F-4's service in the Guard. The F-4s were replaced by F-15s later that year.

During the Saturday performance in 1991, Lee Oman - an aircraft wing walker - had to be lowered into a speeding truck on the runway as the plane flew just above the ground after the performer slipped from position and was caught by the safety wire that was tethered to the landing gear. Oman decided to sit out Sunday's event.

The 1992 show included both the Blue Angels and the Russian Knights in SU-27 fighter jets. The Russian airshow team also featured the Russian Parachute Team, an SU-26, and a Yak-55 monoplane. This show marked the first time in post-Cold War history that a former-Soviet flight team performed in the U.S.

Five months after the 15th annual Portland Rose Festival Air Show took place - on November 14, 2002 - the Portland Rose Festival officials announced they were canceling the Air Show on the basis of "the faltering Oregon and national economies would make it difficult for the air show to turn a profit." The Hillsboro Chamber of Commerce also withdrew their sponsorship of the event on the same day.

In January 2003, a couple of former Rose Festival committee members continued the show and formed a non-profit organization under the name, "Oregon International Air Show." On September 20 & 21, the first "Oregon International Air Show" took place at the Hillsboro Airport, celebrating 100 years the Wright Brothers' first controlled, sustained flight on December 17, 1903. The Patriots Jet Team, USAF F-16 Demo Team, USN F-18 Demo Team, and the U.S. Army Parachute Team highlighted the show. The event drew 51,400 spectators. In November 2003, Judy Willey became the president of the Oregon Air Show.

In 2004, Oregon Air Show president and executive, Judy Willey & Don McCoun, added Friday evening to the two-day public event, sporting Friday evening as a twilight show. That year, the United States Navy's Blue Angels and "Fat Albert" performed at the show. The Oregon Air Show donated $88,000 to local charities in 2004.

The following year, the Oregon Air Show hosted the U.S. Air Force Thunderbirds.

Following the 2006 accident (see below), the 2007 Air Show - featuring the Blue Angels - drew 93,000 spectators.

The Blue Angels were scheduled to perform at the 2013 show. Unfortunately, the federal budget sequester resulted in the cancellation of Blue Angels performances. Instead, the Patriots Jet Team served as the replacement headliner for the 2013 show. The Blue Angels returned to the Oregon Air Show two years later.

In late 2014, president Judy Willey stepped down, replaced by Bill Braack, then the Air Show's Director of Operations.

In 2016, the Breitling Jet Team took to the skies at the Oregon Air Show for the first time in Oregon Air Show history.

Because of runway construction at the Hillsboro Airport, the air show moved to a different venue for the 2019 show. It held the show at the McMinnville Municipal Airport, in Yamhill County. This was the first time the Oregon Air Show held their event at a different airport. In that same year, the Red Arrows performed at the Saturday show for the first time in Oregon Air Show history as a part of their first North American Tour in more than a decade. Unfortunately, due to rain on Sunday, the Red Arrows announced they would not fly as a safety precaution.

Due to COVID-19 concerns and restrictions, the Oregon Air Show cancelled the 2020 show - scheduled for September 25–27 at the McMinnville Municipal Airport. It was the first time in Oregon Air Show history that the show was cancelled.

In 2021, the Oregon Air Show planned to produce two shows. The first show was to be at the Hillsboro Airport from 21–23 May 2021, but was deferred to next year. The second show will be held at the McMinnville Municipal Airport from 30 July–01 August 2021. This was to be the first time the Oregon Air Show will produce two shows in its history; they'll try again next year. The Oregon Air Show will feature the first all-female, "unmanned" air show in history at the 2022 Hillsboro show. This includes all-female performers, air bosses, and announcers. The USAF Thunderbirds will return to Oregon after nine years at the 2021 McMinnville show.

== Performers, Fly-Bys, and Static Displays ==
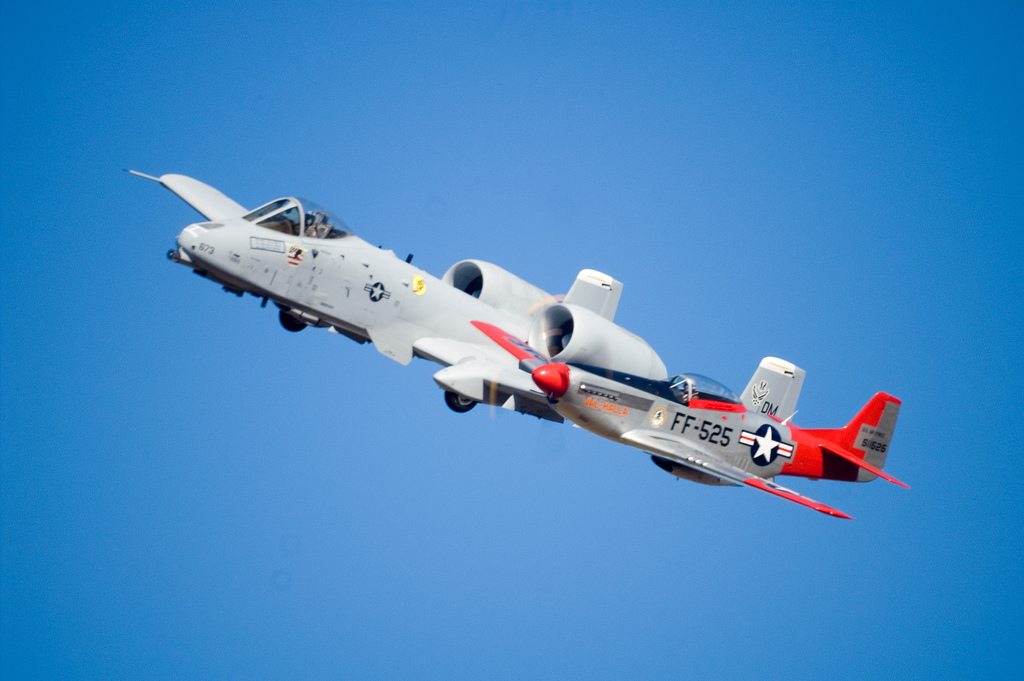
An A-10 Thunderbolt II and a P-51 Mustang at the 2006 Oregon International Air Show.

Demonstrations teams that have performed at the Oregon Air Show:

- U.S. Navy Blue Angels - 1988, 1990, 1992, 1995, 1997, 2000, 2004, 2007, 2015
- U.S. Air Force Thunderbirds - 1994, 1998, 2002, 2005, 2009, 2012, 2021
- Patriots Jet Team - 2003, 2008, 2010, 2011, 2013
- RCAF Snowbirds - 1993, 2014, 2018, 2025
- Russian Knights - 1992
- Breitling Jet Team - 2016
- RAF Red Arrows - 2019

Other aerobatic displays have included the U.S. Army Golden Knights, the USSOCOM Paracommandos, Patty Wagstaff, Sean D. Tucker, Oregon National Guard's F-15 Eagles, Renny Price, Mike Wiskus, Heritage Flights, F-16 Demo, F-18 Demo, F-22 Demo, A-10 Demo, F-35A Demo, and many more.

An F-117 stealth fighter, B-52 Stratofortress, Alaska Airlines 737-800, Horizon Airlines Q400, C-17 Globemaster III, and many more have conducted fly-bys at the Air Show.

Static displays have included Robosaurus, F-86 Sabre, F-15 Eagle, MiG-17, MiG-21, F-104G, A-26 Invader, UH-60 Black Hawk helicopter, T-1A Jayhawk, a HC-130 Hercules, and many others.

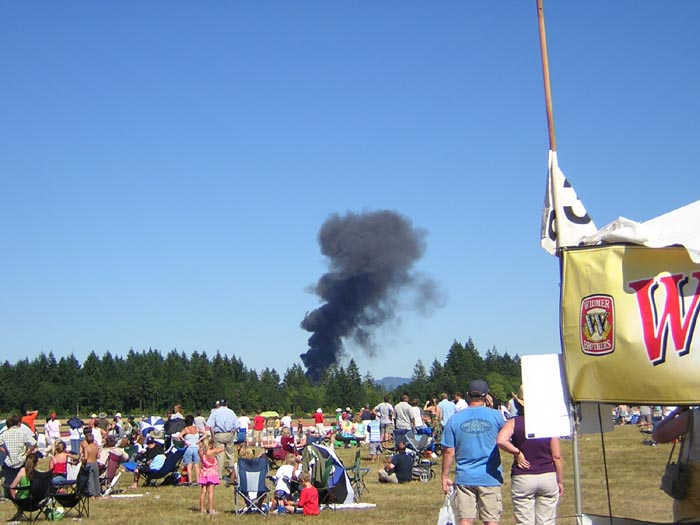
Smoke plume from the crashed Hawker Hunter on July 16, 2006.

== Accidents ==
July 16, 2006: After the show ended on Sunday, a Hawker Hunter jet (N58MX) flown by pilot Robert "Bob" Guilford, crashed after takeoff. After the plane was airborne, Guilford climbed about 1,500 feet into the air and made a right turn. He came back around towards the Hillsboro Airport, and after his turn and passed by the airport losing altitude and speed quickly. Soon after, the Mk.58 Hunter stalled and impacted the ground in a fireball. Four houses were damaged and the pilot died on impact, but there were no casualties on the ground. The jet had been on static display at the show, and was not an aerial performer. The pilot had taken off to return to his home in California near the end of the show when the crash occurred.

== Dolores 'Dolly' Bowman Day/Margaret Teufel Day ==
Formerly known as "Arrival Day," "Special Kids Day," and "Special Kids Day In Honor of Margaret Teufel," the Air Show invites disabled children and their chaperones to attend the Air Show each year.

Dolores Bowman was the Administrative Vice President for Jefferson High School and Rose Festival Director. She also played a significant role in the renaming of "Highland Elementary" to "King Elementary" in honor of Martin Luther King, Jr and in bringing the Special Olympics to the Pacific Northwest. In 1988, she created "Arrival Day," where each Friday of the show, approximately 1,200+ disabled children and their chaperones were invited to exclusively watch the performers arrive at the Air Show. In May 1989 she died. That year, "Arrival Day" changed its name to "Special Kids Day."

In 1993, "Special Kids Day" changed to "Special Kids Day Honoring Dolores Bowman." Two years later, in addition to inviting disabled children to the event, the Air Show granted scholarships to local organizations like Self-Enhancement, Inc., Warren Strickland Foundation for Airway Science (now Airway Science for Kids), OMSI, Albertina Kerr, and Doernbecher.

In 1999, "Special Kids Day Honoring Dolores Bowman" officially became known as "Dolores Bowman Day."

After splitting from the Rose Festival in 2002/2003, organizers moved the day to Sunday so the children could see the show rather than the performer arrivals.

In 2004, organizers renamed the day to "Special Kids Day in Honor of Margaret Teufel," who died in April 2003. Margaret Teufel was a role model in the Hillsboro community. She was a special education teacher in the Hillsboro School District and then taught education classes at Oregon College of Education. She was financial officer and chief executive officer of Oregon Roses Inc. In the late 1970s, she started the Blood for Roses Program of the American Red Cross, where she gave a dozen roses to each person who donated blood. In 1955, she was named National Teacher of the Year by National Education Association. She also served on the Hillsboro Library Foundation Board.

In 2015, "Special Kids Day in Honor of Margaret Teufel" officially became "Margaret Teufel Day." Organizers added Saturday to Margaret Teufel Day.

The Air Show continues to invite disabled children and their chaperones to Saturday and Sunday's air show each year through various community partners.
