= Swan Island Airport =

Former airport in Portland, Oregon, U.S.

Swan Island Municipal Airport
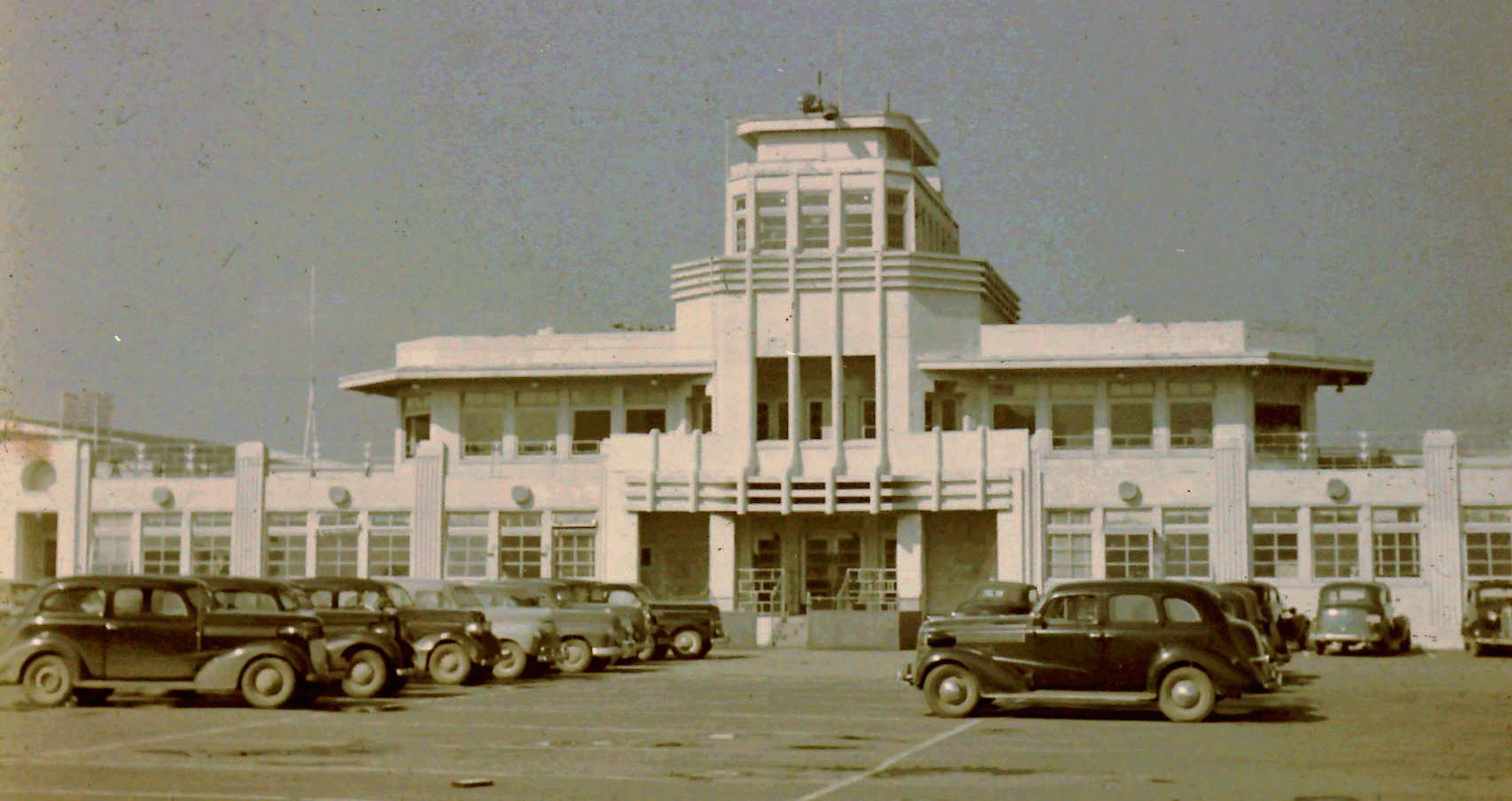

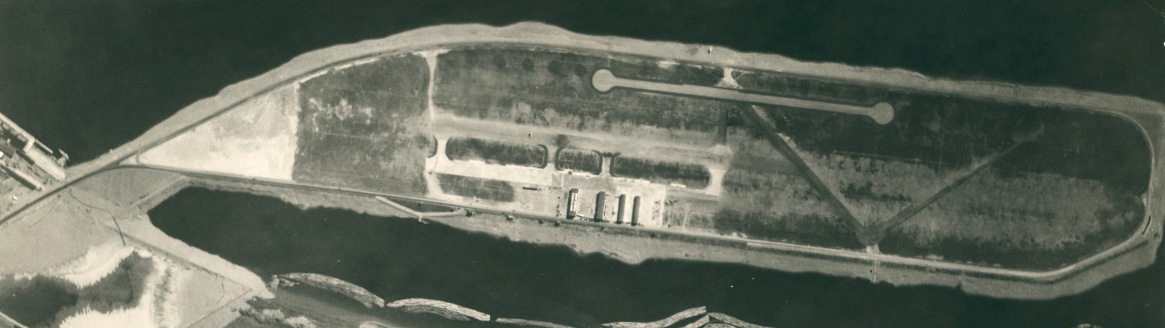
- IATA: none; ICAO: none

Summary
- Airport type: military/public
- Owner/Operator: Port of Portland
- Serves: Portland, Oregon
- Opened: 1926 (USPS), 1927 (commercial)
- Passenger services ceased: 1940
- Elevation AMSL: 20 ft / 6.1 m
- Coordinates: 45°33′42″N 122°42′53″W
- Interactive map of Swan Island Municipal Airport

The Swan Island Municipal Airport was a joint civil-military airport that was operational on Swan Island in Portland, Oregon. Though it officially opened in 1927, the United States Postal Service had been using the airfield for a year. After the Portland–Columbia Super Airport was completed in the late 1930s, Swan Island Municipal Airport had little use since its runways were too small for newer aircraft and the low altitude made takeoffs and landings difficult. The airport was operational for nearly two decades, but due in part to the advances in aviation, it became obsolete soon after its construction. During World War II, a Kaiser shipyard was located at Swan Island. The shipbuilding facilities were acquired by the Port of Portland after the war.

== History ==
Oakley G. Kelly, the commanding officer at Pearson Airfield in Vancouver, Washington, was one of the first to seriously propose using Swan Island as an airfield. In 1926, the Port of Portland, assisted by the United States Postal Service (USPS), organized a committee to look for a location for a new airport in Portland. The group chose Swan Island which was a peninsula along the Willamette River. Objections over the airport started almost immediately, as postal workers who were using Pearson Airfield claimed Swan Island might flood. A plan was drawn up to raise the elevation of Swan Island to keep floodwater out. W. L. Thompson spearheaded the commission and was the project's chief engineer. James H. Polhemus was the Port of Portland's general manager and chief engineer at the time.

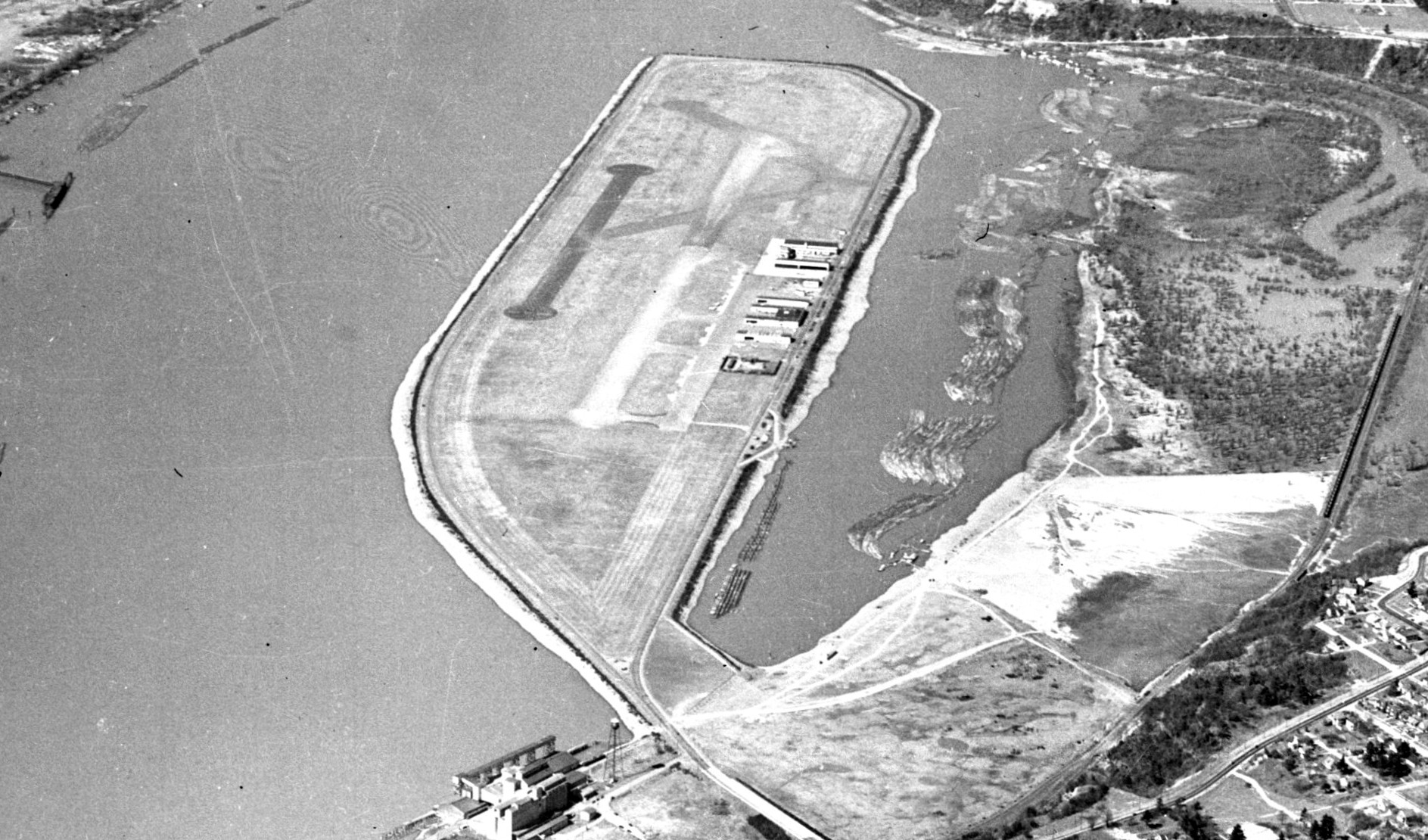
The airport photographed in 1935

In a proposal to the Port of Portland, the west channel of the Willamette River next to Swan Island would have to be widened, and a dike built to keep high water out. In May 1926, the project extended its timeline, forcing the USPS to continue using Pearson Airfield in Vancouver to deliver mail to the city. Most of the accommodations for the USPS at Swan Island Municipal Airport opened in September 1926, but commercial services were still being readied. The airfield only took-up a fraction of the land on Swan Island. The other areas were cleared and leveled so industrial growth could take place. During its construction, the Port of Portland requested that the Swan Island Municipal Airport be the future site of the Pacific Coast Air Derby, which was approved.

Swan Island Municipal Airport was officially dedicated in September 1927 by Charles Lindbergh, who flew the Spirit of St. Louis onto the airstrip. Although construction at the field had not been entirely completed, most of the facilities like hangars and landing strips were finished. Adjacent to the airport was Rankin Airfield, which was a private strip owned by a local resident. Upon its completion, the airport cost US$557,073 (US$10,130,981 adjusted for inflation). The official opening of the Swan Island Municipal Airport came on September 27, 1927, during the Pacific Coast Air Derby where six army planes performed for 10,000 paid spectators. A gravel runway was constructed in 1928, replacing the previous dirt runway. In 1929, Varney Air Lines started passenger services between Portland and Boise, Idaho, and later that year from Portland to Salt Lake City, Utah, and Portland to Pasco, Washington.

A United Airlines / Western Air Express Boeing 247D crashed on November 9, 1933, after a failed takeoff from Swan Island Municipal Airport. The passenger transport plane, which was carrying seven passengers and three crew, was destined for a stopover at The Dalles, Oregon, enroute to Medford, Oregon. The plane took off at night in dense fog and skidded off the runway, but was still able to climb. The pilots miscalculated their direction and crashed into the Tualatin Mountains west of the airport. Three passengers and one crew member were killed.

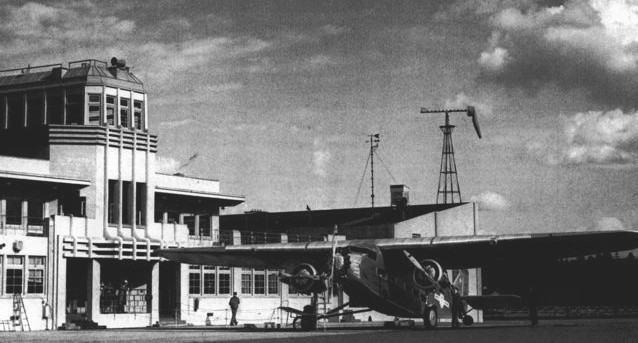
An aircraft at Swan Island Municipal Airport, parked at the terminal

The Port of Portland and the Portland City Council held meetings in 1935 to investigate a possible renovation of the Swan Island Municipal Airport. They determined that it would not be cost effective to rebuild the airport to accommodate larger aircraft. By 1936, citizens were petitioning the city council to fund a larger airport at a higher elevation. I. E. Oakes, the Works Progress Administration director for Portland, announced in 1937 that he would look to secure US$627,781 (US$14,059,679 adjusted for inflation) in funds from the federal government to build a new runway to accommodate large airlines. However, the federal government condemned the site and offered up funds to build a new airport.

After the Portland–Columbia Super Airport was constructed, the Swan Island Municipal Airport still operated, although in a diminished capacity. Flying students were banned from using the airport in their training programs due to the low altitude. The military removed their facilities from the airport and most commercial liners had moved their services to the new airport. During World War II, Swan Island was the location of a Kaiser shipyard where T2 tankers, Liberty ships, and Victory ships were produced in support of the war effort. After the war, the shipyard became the center for Port of Portland operations.

== See also ==
- Jantzen Beach Seaplane Base
- Pearson Field
- Portland International Airport
