= Swan Island (Oregon) =

Landform in Portland, Oregon, U.S.

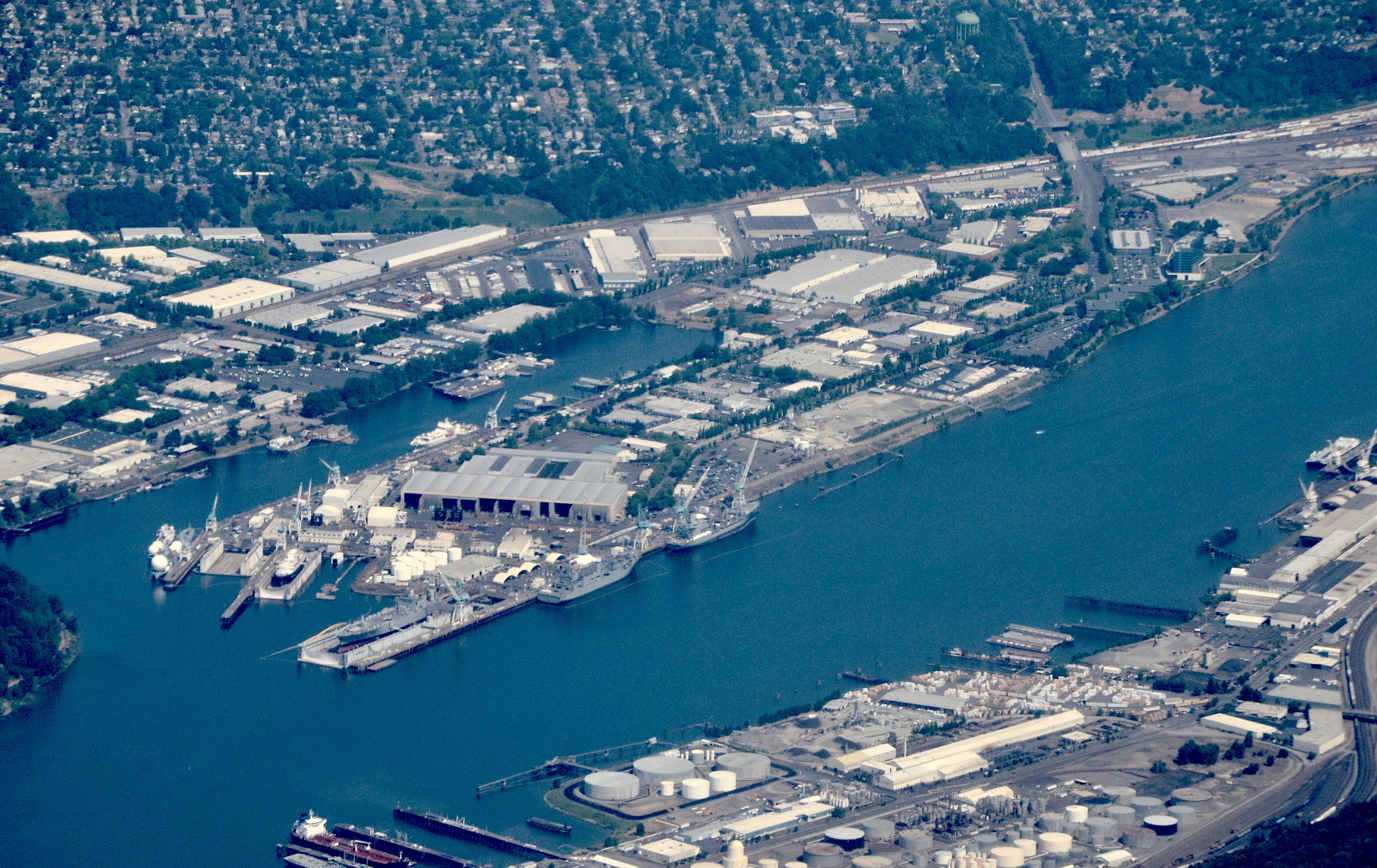
- Swan Island from the west in 2018

- Location within Oregon Location within Portland, Oregon

Geography
- Location: Willamette River
- Coordinates: 45°33′38″N 122°42′32″W
- Highest elevation: 39 ft (11.9 m)

Swan Island is located on the Willamette River about 4.5 miles (7.2 km) downriver from downtown Portland, Oregon, United States. Although presently connected to the Willamette's east bank by land fill, it existed as a river island under natural conditions. (Note: The compilers of Oregon Geographic Names note: "Despite the fact that the land is no longer an island, the name Swan Island is firmly and affectionately fixed in the public mind.")

Swan Island and a nearby bar posed an obstacle to river traffic during the 19th and early 20th centuries, with larger vessels being restricted to a narrow channel on the island's east side. Proposals on how to improve navigation around the island included widening one of its channels or removing the island completely.

Swan Island was acquired by the Port of Portland in 1921. The Port undertook dredging to expand the channel on the island's west side, using some of the dredged material to connect the island to the Willamette's east bank. The newly developed area was the site of the Swan Island Airport from 1927 until the early 1940s and was the site of a Kaiser shipyard during World War II. The shipyard facilities were acquired by the Port of Portland after the war, and the area is presently an industrial park.

== History ==
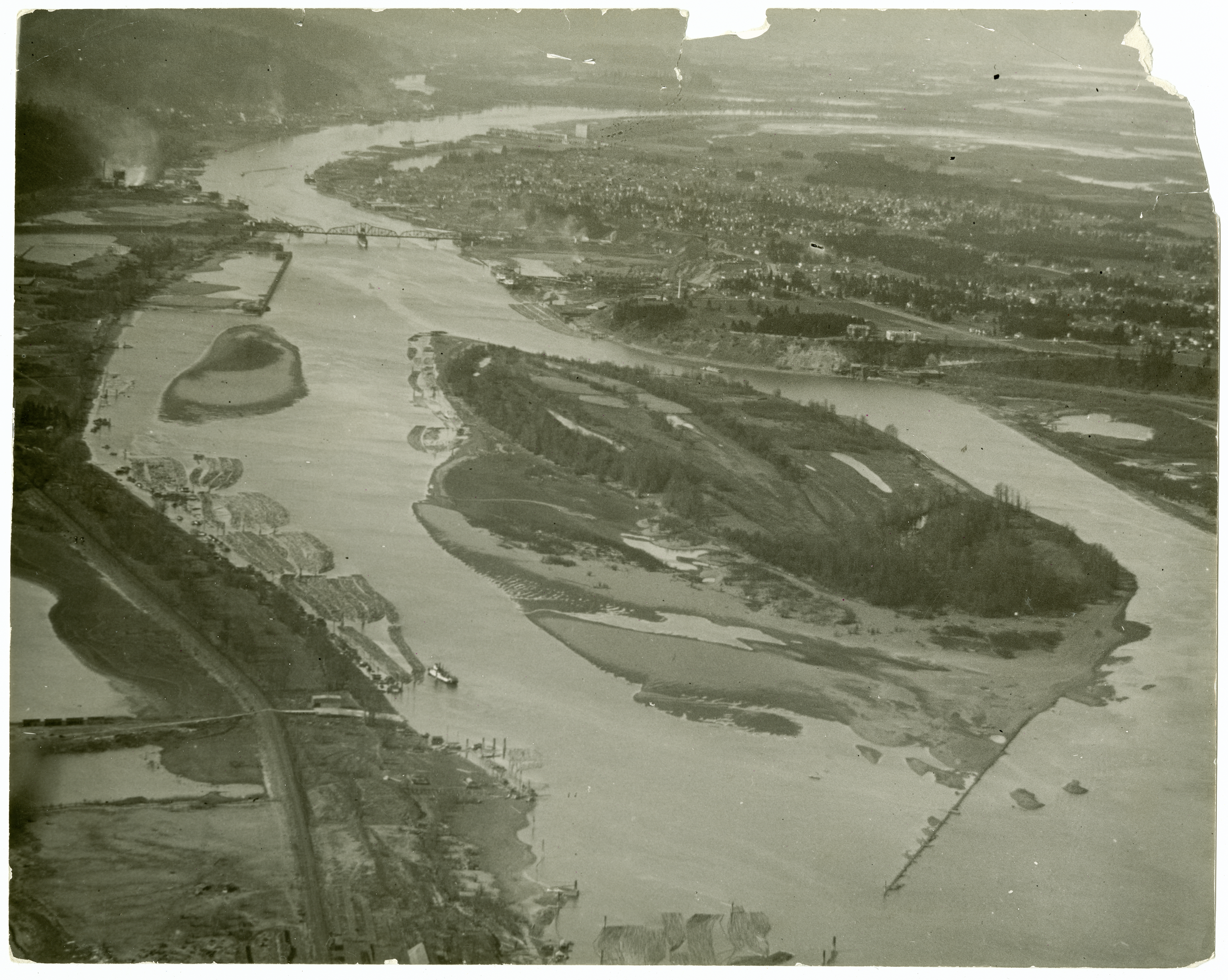
Swan Island from the south in 1920

The island was first noted as "Willow Island" by the United States Exploring Expedition in 1844. River traffic on the Willamette was impeded by a bar near the island, and annual dredging by the U.S. Army Corps of Engineers was required to maintain a navigable channel. A 1914 Oregonian article reported that the Portland Commission of Public Docks was unanimously in favor of removing the island, instead of developing it for commerce.

The purchase of Swan Island was proposed to Portland's city council in March 1920 as part of a $10,000,000 harbor development plan. Other features of this "Swan Island project" included the development of Mock's Bottom, a swampy area directly east of Swan Island, and the draining of Guild's Lake, located west of the island.

=== Swan Island Airport ===
The island was purchased by the Port of Portland in December 1921 at a cost of $120,577. The Port of Portland initially intended to develop Swan Island as a freight terminal site, but decided to construct an airport on the island to speed up the distribution of air mail to the city. Portland did not have an airport at the time, and air mail was instead flown to Pearson Field in Vancouver, Washington, about 10 miles (16 km) distant. A causeway connecting Swan Island to the Willamette's east bank was constructed in conjunction with the airport. Approximately 65 percent of the material dredged from the river—more than 20 million cubic yards (15 million cubic metres)—was deposited in Guild's Lake, and much of the rest was used to connect Swan Island to the Willamette's east bank.

Swan Island Airport was dedicated in 1927. Passenger service ceased in 1940, after completion of the Portland–Columbia Airport, but limited operations continued at the Swan Island airport until 1942. The Port of Portland leased the Swan Island airport to the federal government in March 1942. Tenants of the Swan Island airport were ordered to leave the facilities in late February 1942 to make way for a U.S. Maritime Commission shipyard. At the time of the order, 150 privately owned aircraft were being stored at the airport.

=== Swan Island Shipyard ===
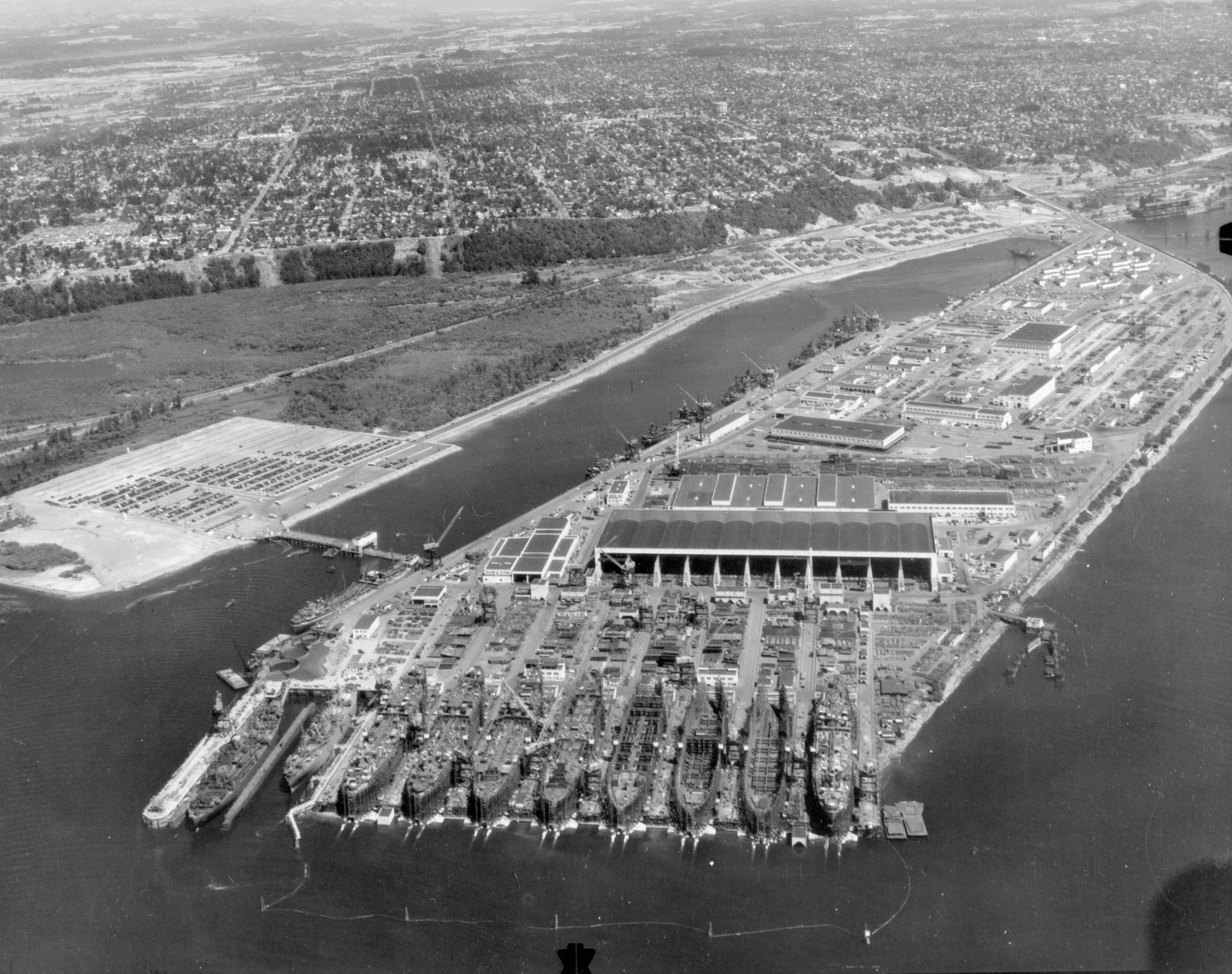
The shipyard in 1945

The Swan Island Shipyard was one of seven constructed by industrialist Henry J. Kaiser on the West Coast—three in the Portland–Vancouver area and four in Richmond, California—to help meet the production demands of the U.S. Maritime Commission in World War II. Swan Island became the site of Kaiser's third Northwest shipyard (the others being the Oregon Shipbuilding Corporation in North Portland, and the Vancouver Shipyard in Vancouver, Washington). The completed Swan Island Shipyard had a total of 8 shipways and began production in July 1942. The shipyard was one of four in the U.S. specifically designed to produce T2 tankers, producing 147 by the end of the war.

=== Post-war development ===
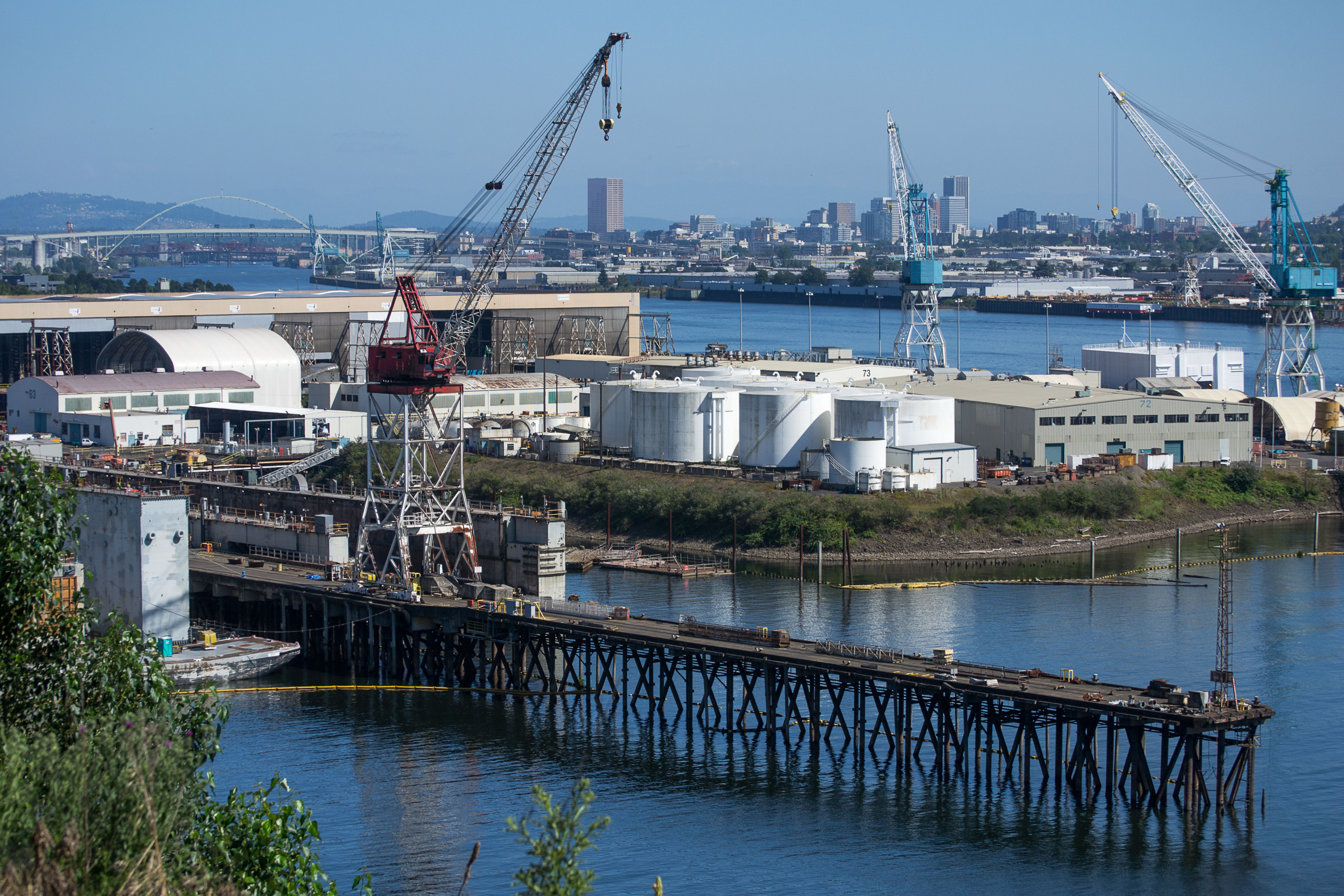
Vigor Industrial's Swan Island shipyard in 2013

Following the end of World War II, the Kaiser company expressed interest in maintaining operations on Swan Island. In December 1946, management of Swan Island and its shipyard facilities was transferred from the U.S. Maritime Commission to the War Assets Administration (WAA). Aviation interests advocated for the area to be converted back to an airfield for use by private aircraft, but the Port of Portland commission stated that this would not be feasible due to the necessity of destroying much of the existing industrial development.

By February 1948, the WAA had begun sub-leasing land on Swan Island until 1952, at which point control of Swan Island would revert to the Port of Portland. In late 1949, port officials and the WAA finalized an agreement for the port to resume control of Swan Island before the federal government's lease expired. The deal gave the port the buildings and equipment needed to operate the shipyard and allowed the leases of businesses already at Swan Island to continue.

Oregon voters approved an $84 million bond to expand the Port of Portland shipyard in the late 1970s. The Port of Portland sold the facilities to shipbuilder Cascade General in 2000 at a cost of $30.8 million.

== Industrial park ==
Swan Island is currently the location of a 430-acre (170 ha) industrial park managed by the Port of Portland. The industrial development extends into the adjacent Mock's Bottom area, a natural wetland that was filled in the 1960s. Vigor Marine Group is headquartered at Swan Island, where it operates a 60-acre (24 ha) shipyard with three dry docks. Swan Island is also the headquarters of Daimler Trucks North America. FedEx and UPS have packaging and distribution centers at the site. As of 2008, more than 10,000 people were employed at the industrial park.

== Citations ==
=== Sources ===
- MacColl, E. Kimbark (1979). The Growth of a City: Power and Politics in Portland, Oregon, 1915 to 1950. Portland: Georgian Press. ISBN 0-9603408-1-5.
- McArthur, Lewis A.; McArthur, Lewis L. (2003). Oregon Geographic Names (7th ed.). Portland: Oregon Historical Society Press. ISBN 0-87595-278-X.
- Sawyer, L. A.; Mitchell, W. H. (1974). Victory Ships and Tankers: The History of the "Victory" Type Cargo Ships and of the Tankers Built in the United States of America During World War II. Cambridge, Maryland: Cornell Maritime Press. ISBN 0-87033-182-5.
- Willingham, William F. (1983). Army Engineers and the Development of Oregon: A History of the Portland District, U.S. Army Corps of Engineers. Washington, D.C.: Government Printing Office. OCLC 11317858.
