= Teufel Nursery =

American landscaping company

Teufel Nursery, Inc.
- Type: Private
- Industry: Nursery
- Founded: 1890; 136 years ago
- Headquarters: Hillsboro, Oregon, USA (since 2011)
- Key people: Larry Teufel, President
- Number of employees: ~200 (2010)
- Website: www.teufel.com

Teufel Nursery is a family-owned landscaping company based in Hillsboro, Oregon, United States. Founded in 1890, the company maintains existing and installs new landscaping for commercial, government, and residential customers. The company has about 200 employees. It was based in Portland until the 1940s, then in the unincorporated Cedar Mill area until 2007. Its headquarters have been in eastern Hillsboro since fall 2011.

== History ==
Gustav Teufel founded the nursery company in 1890 in the West Hills of Portland. Later, and for about 60 years, the company also operated a large wholesale nursery on Barnes Road, in the Cedar Mill area, acquiring the property in 1946 and moving its headquarters to that site. The company closed its operation in Cedar Mill in 2007, when the approximately 90-acre (0.36 km^{2}) property was sold for redevelopment, and moved its headquarters back to its original West Hills site, on Miller Road in Portland.

In September 1997, the Portland Business Journal reported that Terry Thornton, a former sales manager of the "Wholesale Horticultural Supplies Division" of Teufel Nurseries, was installed as the 62nd president of the Oregon Association of Nurserymen (now called the Oregon Association of Nurseries). The Oregonian reported that Teufel Nursery, in partnership with Pivot Landscape Architecture and Cistus Nursery, installed a green roof on the M Financial Center in the Pearl District of downtown Portland in 2009.

The company filed for Chapter 11 bankruptcy protection as well as filing a countersuit in June 2009 when its primary lender, Textron, sued for immediate payment on a $5.9 million note after the drop in the housing market and the recession reduced revenues from a high of $45 million annually in 2006 to around $32 million projected. Teufel, while still being solvent and profitable, experienced difficulties securing new creditors and decided to operate on a cash-only basis and scale back its operations, liquidating a portion of its assets in 2010. Before entering bankruptcy, the company employed more than 500. In June 2011, Teufel repaid its major creditors in full.

== Operations ==
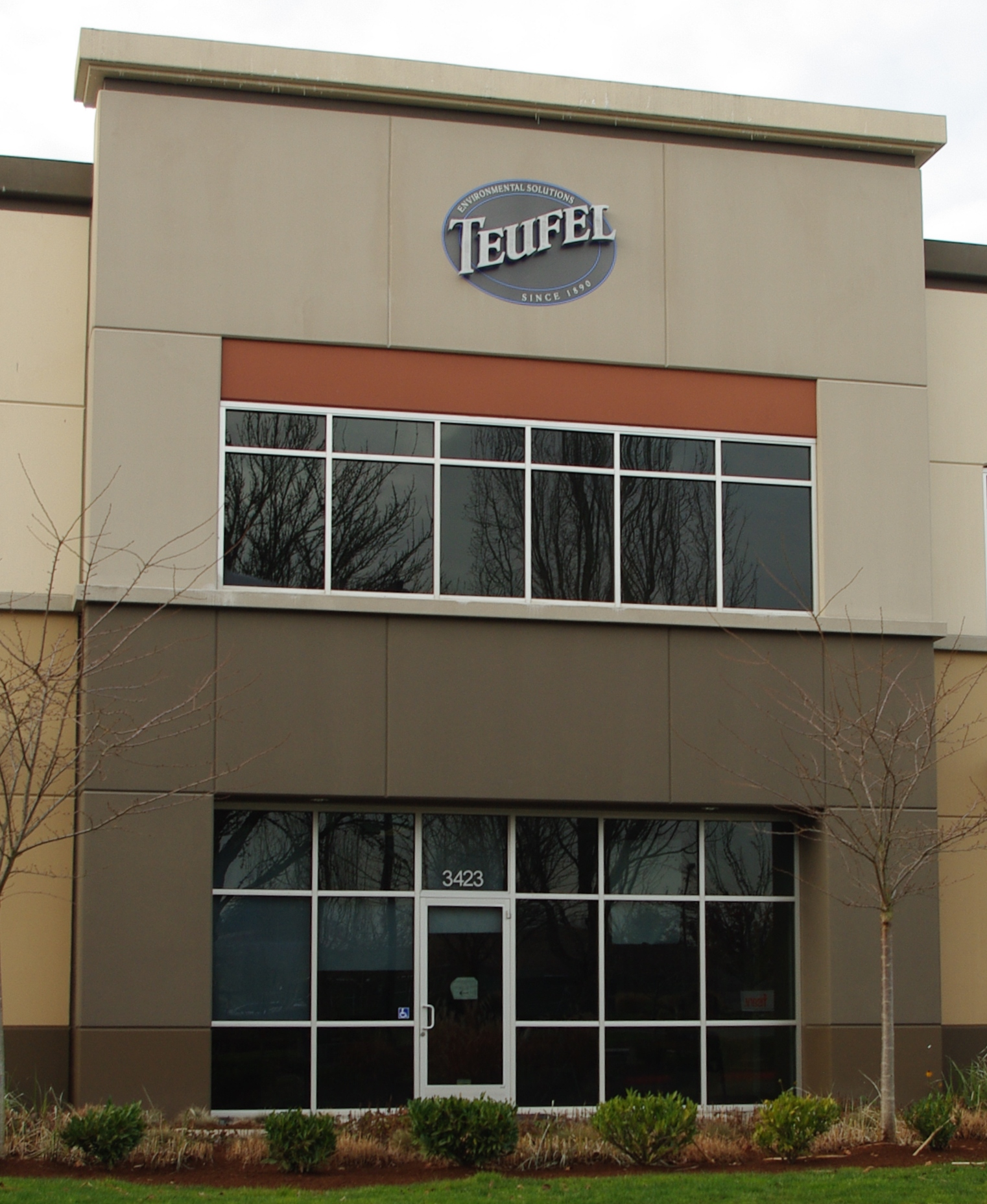
Headquarters in Hillsboro in 2013

Teufel Nursery is currently owned and managed by Gustav's great grandchildren Larry, Linda and Tina Teufel. Significant customers of the company have included OHSU, Portland Rose Garden, Bonneville Power Administration, Microsoft, the Portland World Trade Center, and the White House. The Teufel family also owns and operates Teufel Holly Farms, Inc. which sells holly and evergreens during the winter season and supplies holiday wreaths and garlands for the annual Oregon Episcopal School Christmas Wreath & Holiday Greens Sale. The company was still based in Portland in mid-2011, but it relocated its headquarters in fall 2011 to the Tanasbourne area of Hillsboro, Oregon, on the west side of the Portland metropolitan area. It subsequently moved its headquarters one mile to west, no longer in the Tanasbourne area but still in Hillsboro.
