= Portland–Troutdale Airport =

Troutdale Airport
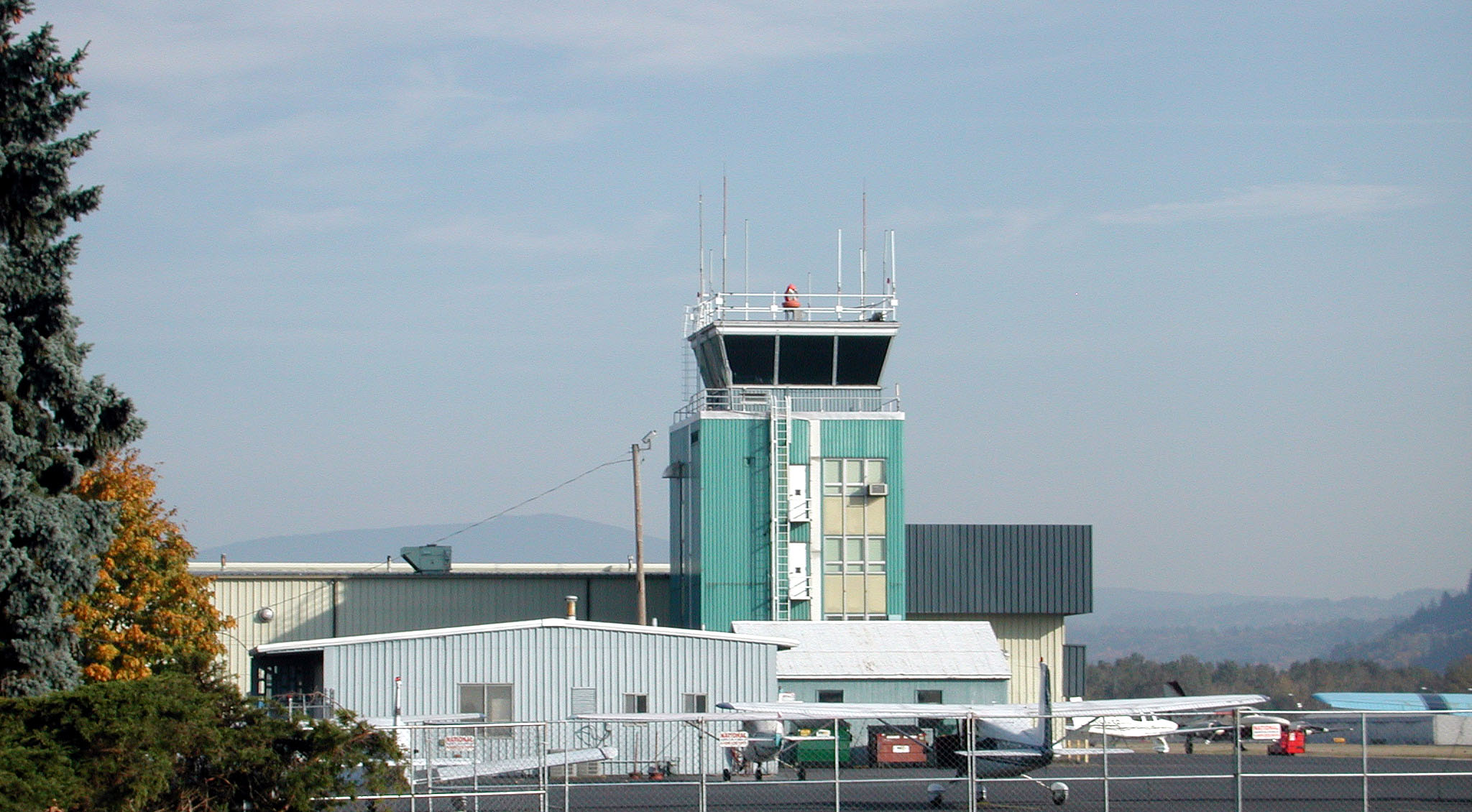
- Control tower
- IATA: TTD; ICAO: KTTD; FAA LID: TTD

Summary
- Airport type: Public
- Owner: Port of Portland
- Operator: Port of Portland
- Serves: Portland, Oregon Troutdale, Oregon Gresham, Oregon Wood Village, Oregon Fairview, Oregon Corbett, Oregon
- Location: Troutdale, Oregon
- Elevation AMSL: 39 ft (12 m)
- Coordinates: 45°32′58″N 122°24′04″W
- Website: TTD home

Maps
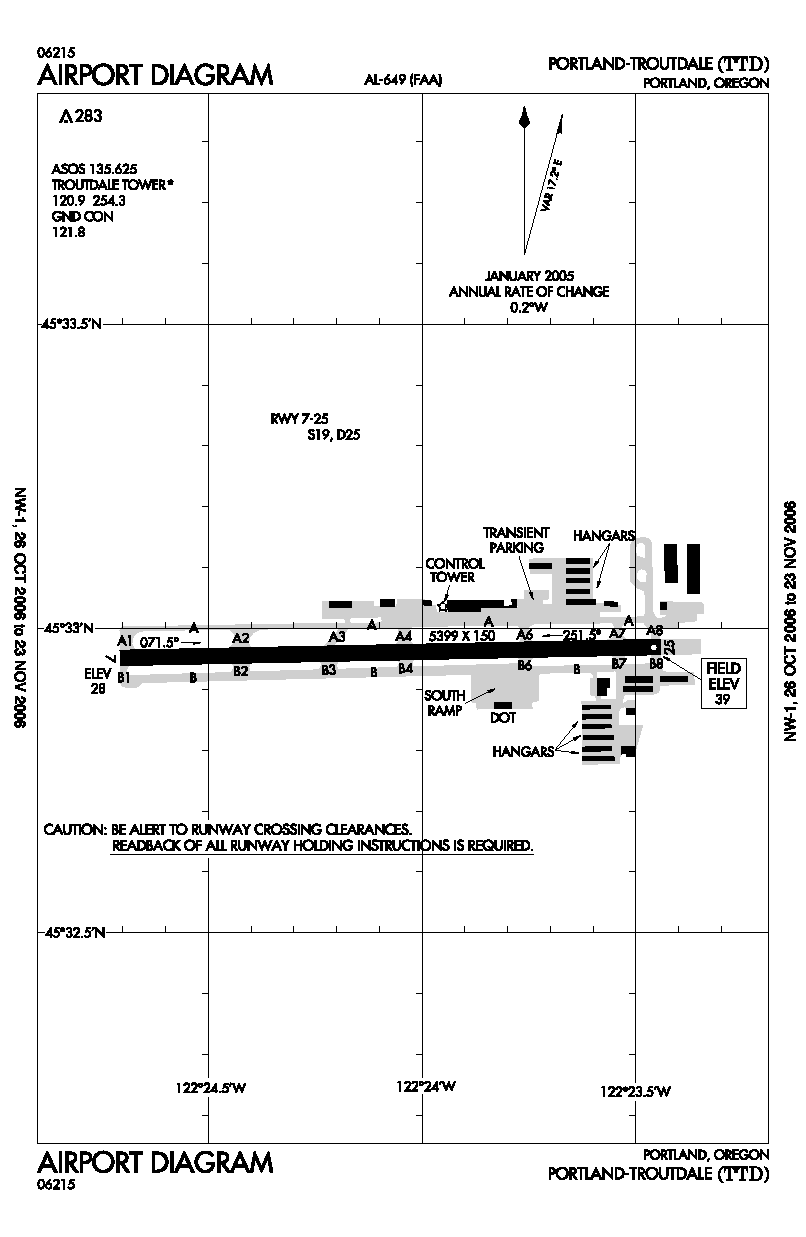
- Airport diagram

- Troutdale, Oregon TTD (the United States)

Runways
Direction	Length		Surface
Direction	ft	m	Surface
7/25	5,399	1,646	Asphalt

Statistics
- Aircraft operations (2017): 105,020
- Source: Federal Aviation Administration

Troutdale Airport (IATA: TTD, ICAO: KTTD, FAA LID: TTD), also known as Troutdale-Portland Airport, is a corporate, general aviation, and flight-training airport serving the city of Troutdale, in Multnomah County, Oregon, United States. It is one of three airports in the Portland metropolitan area owned and operated by the Port of Portland. Troutdale Airport was established in 1920 as a private airfield, then purchased by the Port of Portland in 1942. It serves as a reliever airport for nearby Portland International Airport (PDX).

Located in North Troutdale, and east of Portland, and south of Troutdale Reynolds Industrial park. Northeast of Fairview and Wood Village, and East of Interlachen and North Gresham. The airport includes a Federal Aviation Administration contract control tower, one paved runway, hangars, fueling facilities, a helipad, and a small passenger terminal. Troutdale Airport is often referred to by its IATA airport code, TTD.

== Operations ==
Located in Portland's eastern Multnomah County suburbs, Troutdale Airport is connected to the metropolitan area by TriMet buses. The primary public access point is NW Frontage Road on the south side of the airport. Facilities include a 5,400 by 150 feet (1,646 m × 46 m) runway), two taxiways (50 feet wide) and a FAA control tower, hangars, fueling facilities, a helipad, and a small main passenger terminal. The main terminal includes airport offices and a waiting area.

The airport was purchased by the Port of Portland in 1942, and is serving as a reliever airport for nearby Portland International Airport. It has been developed to support all forms of general aviation and is home to one fixed-base operator (FBO), several limited FBOs, flight schools, and aircraft repair and maintenance facilities.

=== Services ===
- Gorge Winds Aviation
- Envi Adventures
- Advanced Aircraft Services
- Premier Aircraft Engines
- Emerald Aircrafters
- Hillsboro Aviation

== Facilities and aircraft ==
Portland–Troutdale Airport covers an area of 284 acres (115 ha) at an elevation of 39 feet (12 m) above mean sea level. It has one runway designated 7/25 with an asphalt surface measuring 5,399 by 150 feet (1,646 m × 46 m), with a weight bearing capacity of 19,000 lbs for runway 7/25 and taxiways A and B.

== Accidents and incidents ==
- On May 10, 1958, a Boeing Stratoliner S.307, registered N75385, being operated by Quaker City Airways was taken out of storage at Troutdale Airport and prepared for a ferry flight to determine fuel and oil consumption. The auxiliary gasoline tanks that were installed in the cabin were not tested prior to the flight, despite there being fuel leaks of an undefined source. During the flight, there was a blast in the fuselage and fire could be seen coming from the accessory compartment. A forced landing was carried out on an elevated plain with grass-covered boulders; the plane went up in flames resulting in its loss. This plane was one of ten built of this specific model, with this being the second loss of this aircraft type. There were no reported injuries.
- On August 12, 1962, at about 4 am, United Air Lines Flight 861, a scheduled flight from Chicago to Portland, inadvertently landed at Troutdale airport. As the plane broke from cloud cover, Captain S.R. Whipple, a senior pilot flying for United for more than 25 years, saw the runway directly in front of him. As he was already cleared to land by the Portland tower, Whipple mistook the lights of the Troutdale airport for Portland International Airport and landed on Troutdale's 4,630-foot long runway. No passenger injuries and no aircraft damage was reported. The 81 perplexed passengers disembarked shortly after their unexpected landing in Troutdale and were transported with their luggage to the Portland airport, approximately 11 miles away. However, deplaning was delayed as passengers and crew waited for boarding stairs to arrive from Portland airport. United Air Lines determined that the DC-8 could take off from the 4,600-foot airstrip in Troutdale, and brought in a pilot, Bartlett Stephens, from Seattle to handle the task. The fuel in the DC-8 was pumped nearly empty, leaving just enough to ferry the aircraft to Portland International Airport, and everything not bolted to the plane was removed. A fence was taken down and some of the grass burned to extend the runway for the aircraft to take off. The plane was positioned as far back as possible on runway 25, leaving its tail hanging out across Northeast Graham Road. After the aircraft and airport were prepared, pilot Stephens began the take-off roll at approximately 12:15 pm. The plane took off without incident and rotated a little over halfway down the runway. A few minutes later the DC-8 touched down at Portland International Airport, its intended destination. Following the incident, United Airlines was quoted in The Oregonian stating the company was conducting an investigation and that Captain Whipple had been grounded pending the outcome. A few days later, the Federal Aviation Administration suspended Captain Whipple’s license for 30 days and suspended the co-pilot for two weeks.
- On June 30, 2017, a Robinson R22 helicopter was damaged while performing an emergency landing during training. The pilot lost control of the helicopter's tail rotor as a result of the helicopter slowing down too quickly, the helicopter plummeted to the ground, and rolled over. The aircraft was declared a total loss, but there were no injuries reported.
- On August 31, 2024, a Cessna 421C crashed into townhomes in the nearby city of Fairview, killing the pilot, a passenger, and one person on the ground. The crash caused a fire that damaged four homes on the ground along Heartwood Circle. Prior to the crash, the pilot had reported problems to the Troutdale Airport control tower, where the flight originated.
