= Port of Portland (Oregon) =

Port authority in Portland, Oregon, U.S.

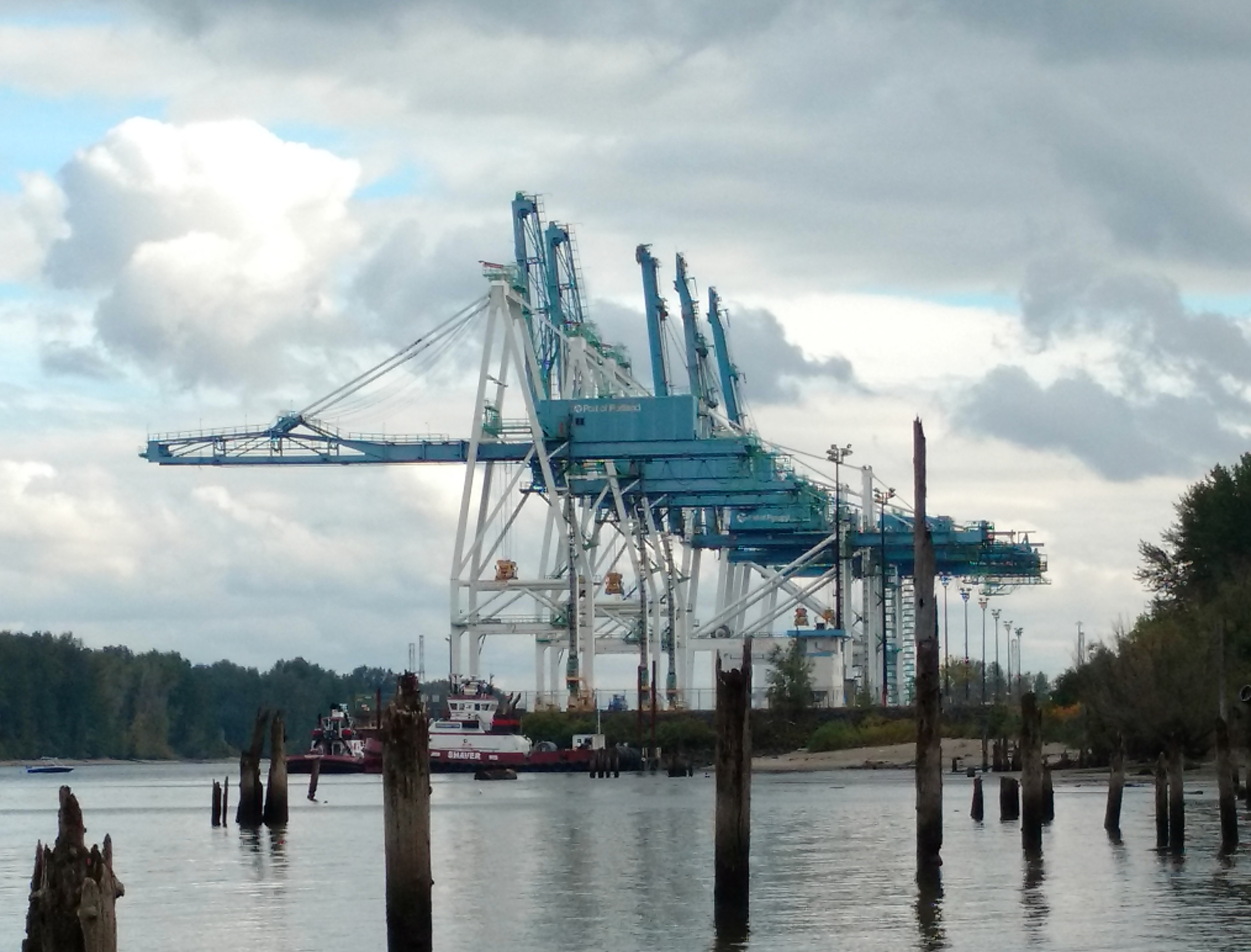
- Marine Terminal 6—the state's only deep-draft container terminal
- Interactive map of Port of Portland

Location
- Country: United States
- Location: Portland, Oregon
- Coordinates: 45.5883°N 122.5895°W

Details
- Opened: 1891
- Main imports: Automobiles, steel, and limestone
- Main exports: Wheat, soda ash, potash, and hay

Statistics
- Draft depth: 43 feet (13 m)
- Air draft: 196 feet (60 m), restricted by Astoria–Megler Bridge
- Website www.portofportland.com

The Port of Portland is the port district responsible for overseeing Portland International Airport, general aviation, and marine activities in the Portland, Oregon, metropolitan area in the United States. Originally established in 1891 by the 16th Oregon Legislative Assembly, the current incarnation was created by the 1970 legislature, combining the original Port with the Portland Commission of Public Docks, a city agency dating from 1910.

The Port of Portland owns four marine terminals, including Oregon's only deep-draft container port, and three airports. The Port manages five industrial parks around the metropolitan area, and they own and operate the dredge Oregon to help maintain the navigation channel on the lower Columbia and Willamette rivers.

== History ==
=== 19th century ===
In 1891, the Oregon Legislature created the Port to dredge and maintain a shipping channel from the city of Portland to the Pacific Ocean. Through the years, the Port acquired the Commission of Public Docks, which operated public-use docks in Portland Harbor, and they built Portland's first airport.

=== 20th century ===
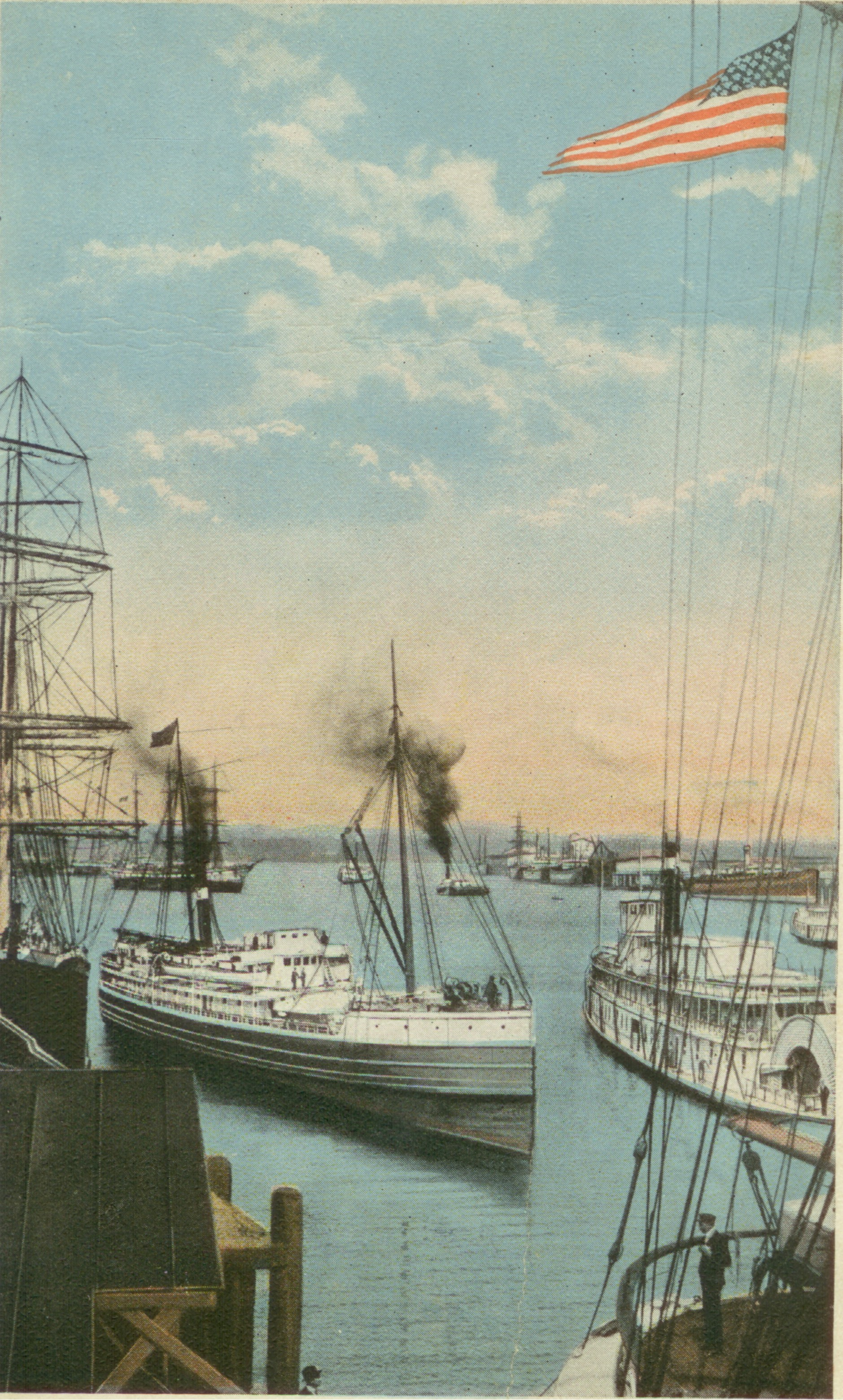
Portland Harbor in the early 1900s

The Port of Portland's administration was embroiled in questionable business practices in the early 1930s. Port authorities, including James H. Polhemus, the general manager of the port from 1923 to 1936, were found guilty of mismanagement, both through conflict of interest and cronyism, as well as negligence, sale of equipment at lower than assessed prices, carelessness, and preferential treatment of some private shippers. Much of the blame was because of discounted rates for using the port's dry dock. Companies specifically named as beneficiaries of this graft were McCormick Steamship Company and States Steamship Company. The investigating committee called for the resignation of Polhemus and other staff.

On November 20, 1933, shortly after the commission found Polhemus and his staff guilty, professional auditor Frank Akin was found shot to death. His murder was never solved, leading to many conspiracy theories. In mid-December, the Port commissioners voted to reject the investigating committee brief, meaning Polhemus was exonerated. Polhemus stayed with the Port for another three years before becoming a vice president at Portland General Electric. MacColl summarized the events in 1979, saying this:

clearly revealed the political nature of the Port of Portland Commission. It has always been embroiled in politics; it is still embroiled in politics.... The unpaid job of Port commissioner remains one of the choicest rewards that a governor can bestow upon his close friends and largest political backers. The very nature of this kind of an appointive process is fraught with potential conflicts of interest.

=== 21st century ===
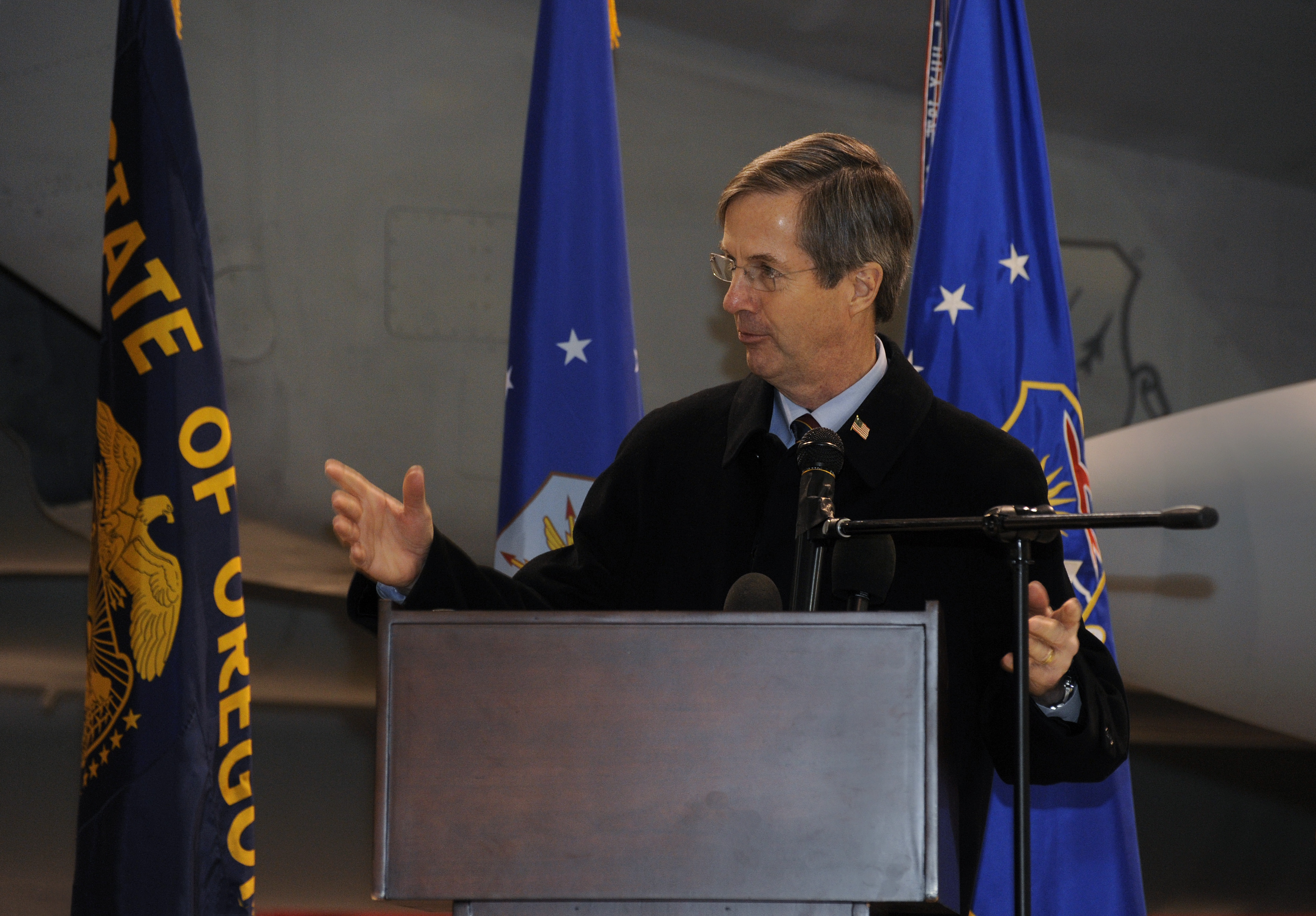
Executive director Bill Wyatt speaks at the Port of Portland lease signing ceremony for the Portland Air National Guard Base in 2013.

From the mid 1970s until 2007, the Port itself operated Terminal 6, the sole shipping container terminal in Oregon, losing money every year but two while seeing its role as that of subsidizing the state's greater economy. In an attempt to operate the port sustainably, the port signed a 25-year lease in 2010 with Philippines-based International Container Terminal Services for $4.5 million annual payments.

In February 2014, a safety inspection at Terminal 6 by the US Occupational Safety and Health Administration "found ICTSI Oregon to be in violation of more than a dozen worker safety codes, such as not informing employees about potential exposure to airborne lead and having workers operate machinery that lacked proper guards against flying objects." OSHA imposed fines of $18,360 against ICTSI Oregon for the violations. In May 2014, a National Labor Relations Board judge ruled that the International Longshore and Warehouse Union (which represents dockworkers at all West Coast ports, including Portland) was intentionally and unlawfully slowing work, with the goal of driving business out of the Port of Portland, partly due to a dispute over having their workers setup electrical connections to refrigerated containers rather than workers belonging to a different union.

On March 9, 2015, Hanjin, a South Korean–based shipping line which accounted for 78% of all container traffic to the Port of Portland, stopped serving the Port at Terminal 6 because of low productivity (including inefficient loading and unloading) and increased costs. This decision came during a labor dispute between the terminal operator ICTSI and the ILWU. In 2013, when first announcing its intent to withdraw from Portland, Hanjin stated: "The actual charges have substantially increased, and when productivity doesn’t meet our norms, the cost goes up even more." as the cause for its departure to other ports.

On March 26, 2015, the second-largest shipping line, Hapag-Lloyd, said it was dropping the Portland call "in order to maintain the schedule integrity of the Med Pacific Service service." To replace connections to Idaho, the Port began a barge service carrying pulse exports from Lewiston to Portland in December of that year. Westwood Shipping Lines ceased service to Terminal 6 in May 2016. In November 2017, the port announced that container service to Portland would resume in January 2018 with Hong Kong–based Swire Shipping. In February 2017, the Port of Portland and ICTSI announced they had reached a deal to end their lease agreement early, with ICTSI paying the port about $20 million.

In November 2019, ICTSI Oregon won $94 million in damages in a jury trial verdict against ILWU for unlawful labor practices including "work stoppages, slowdowns, ‘safety gimmicks’ and other coercive actions," which occurred between August 2013 and March 2017 and resulted in all shippers vacating the Portland terminal. In March 2020, the judge reduced the amount to $19 million.

== Jurisdiction ==
The Port of Portland has been considered a regional government with jurisdiction in Multnomah, Washington and Clackamas counties since 1973.

Nine commissioners regulate the organization; they are appointed by the Governor and approved by the State Senate. Each commissioner serves a four-year term and can be reinstated to the same post indefinitely. One requirement of commissioners is that, of the nine, two must live in each of Multnomah, Washington, and Clackamas counties while the remaining three are free to live where they choose.

Commissioners elect the Port of Portland's executive director who oversees the daily operations of the port.

Commissioners meet monthly to discuss the policies of the Port of Portland.

=== Ownership ===
- Four marine terminals
- Five industrial parks
- Three airports
  - Portland International Airport
  - Troutdale Airport
  - Hillsboro Airport
  - Swan Island Municipal Airport (1927–40)

== Marine terminals ==
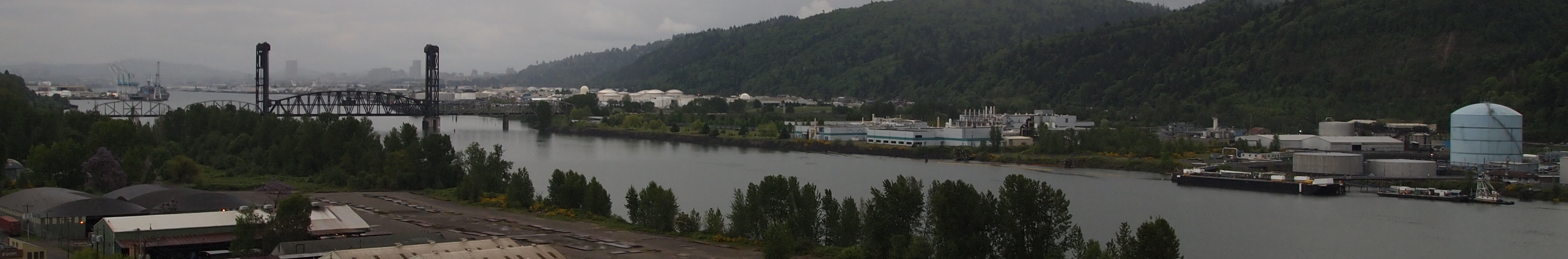
Port of Portland from St. John's Bridge

Port of Portland's marine terminals are located outside the population center with nearby main line rail and interstate highways minimizing congestion for both rail and truck traffic. The Portland Harbor exports the second largest amount of wheat from the United States and the Columbia River system, including Portland, is third largest wheat export gateway in the world. The Port is the fifth largest auto import gateway in the country, and the largest mineral bulk port on the U.S. west coast.

Marine terminals are located along the Willamette River and the Columbia River. Terminals are served by rail (Union Pacific and BNSF railroads), connecting interstates, and river barges.

Major exports include grain, soda ash, potash, automobiles, and hay; major imports are automobiles, steel, machinery, mineral bulks and other varied products.

The Port's terminal facilities (T-2, T-4, and T-5 are on the Willamette River; T-6 is on the Columbia River):

Terminal T-2

- 52.5 acres (212,450 m²)
  - Break Bulk
  - Bulk
  - Army Corps of Engineers

Terminal T-4

- 261.5 acres (1.1 km²)
  - Liquid shipping
  - Mineral shipping
  - Auto shipping

Terminal T-5

- 159 acres (643,450 m²)
  - Grain shipping
  - Minerals shipping
  - Warehouse/manufacturing

Terminal T-6

- 419 acres (2.0 km²)
  - Cargo containers
  - Auto shipping
  - Steel
  - Break Bulk
  - Rail yard access and operation

== Industrial parks ==
The Port of Portland owns five industrial parks in the Portland metropolitan area:

- Rivergate Industrial District
  - 2,800 acres (11 km²)
  - Located 9 miles (14 km) NW of downtown Portland
  - Operates two marine terminals
  - Rail access (Burlington Northern Santa Fe and Union Pacific railroads)
- Troutdale Reynolds Industrial Park
  - 700 acres (2.83 km²)
  - Adjacent the Troutdale Airport
- Portland International Center
  - 458 acres (1.9 km²)
  - Adjacent Portland International Airport
  - Rail access (MAX Light Rail)
- Swan Island Industrial Park/Port Center
  - 430 acres (1.7 km²)
  - 4.5 miles (7 km) north of downtown Portland
  - Rail access (Union Pacific)
- Gresham Vista Business Park
  - 221 acres
  - Eight general industrial lots on 203 acres

== Airports ==
The Portland International Airport (PDX) is owned and operated by the Port of Portland. It is the 30th busiest airport in the United States. The PDX capture region serves a population of more than 3.5 million people in two states (Oregon and Washington).

The airport offers scheduled nonstop passenger service flights to over 69 domestic destinations and 11 international cities. PDX served nearly 17 million passengers in 2015, breaking the all-time passenger record of 15.9 million in 2014. The airport averages more than 230 scheduled passenger departures daily during the busiest travel seasons, and 17 different domestic and international passenger airlines serve PDX. Portland is also well-served by 10 all-air cargo carriers.

PDX serves the commercial, passenger, transport needs of the Portland Metro area, while Hillsboro Airport, also owned by the Port, serves an integral part of the region's transportation system, providing well-maintained, financially viable general aviation facilities to businesses and residents of Washington County and beyond. The Port also owns Portland-Troutdale Airport which serves as a flight training and recreational airport with an increasing emphasis on business class capability.

The first airport operated by the Port of Portland was Swan Island Municipal Airport in 1927. It owned Portland-Mulino Airport, a general aviation field, from 1988 until 2009, when Portland-Mulino was transferred to the Oregon Department of Aviation.

== See also ==
- United States container ports
