= Salt Lake City International Airport =

Airport in Utah, United States

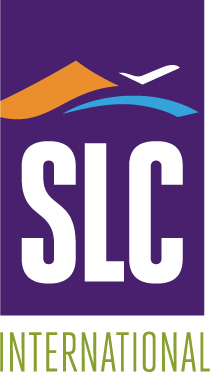

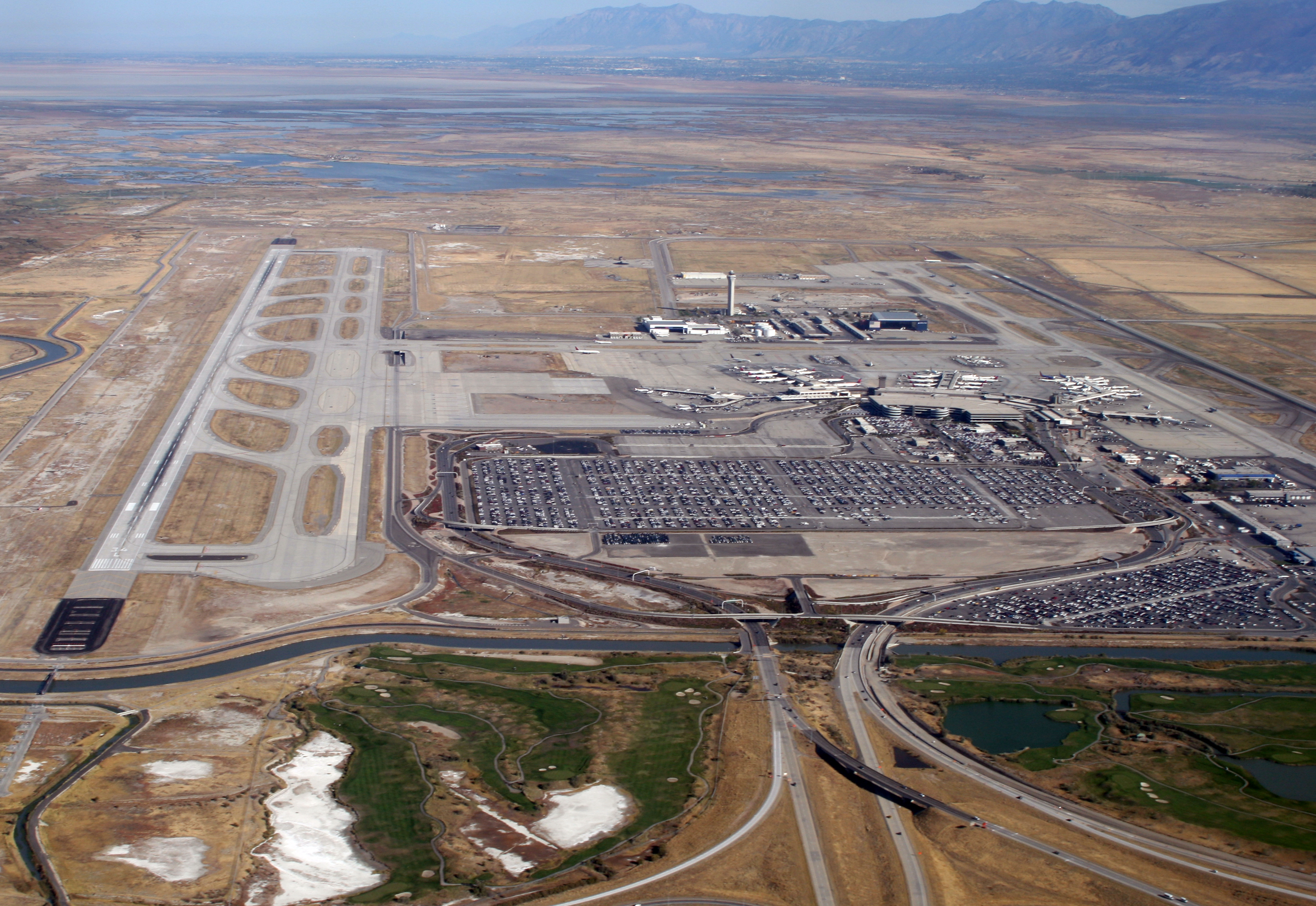
- Salt Lake City International Airport in 2010.
- IATA: SLC; ICAO: KSLC; FAA LID: SLC; WMO: 72572

Summary
- Airport type: Public / Military
- Owner/Operator: Salt Lake City Department of Airports
- Serves: Salt Lake City metropolitan area; Wasatch Front
- Location: Salt Lake City, Utah, U.S.
- Opened: 1911; 115 years ago
- Hub for: Delta Air Lines; Alpine Air Express; Corporate Air
- Time zone: MST (UTC−07:00)
  - Summer (DST): MDT (UTC−06:00)
- Elevation AMSL: 4,227 ft (1,288 m)
- Coordinates: 40°47′18″N 111°58′40″W
- Public transit access: Airport
- Website: www.slcairport.com

Maps
- FAA airport diagram
- Interactive map of Salt Lake City International Airport

Runways
Direction	Length		Surface
Direction	ft	m	Surface
16L/34R	12,002	3,658	Asphalt
16R/34L	12,000	3,658	Concrete
17/35	9,596	2,925	Asphalt

Helipads
Number	Length		Surface
Number	ft	m	Surface
HB	60	18	Asphalt
HF	60	18	Asphalt

Statistics (2025)
- Passengers: 28,158,007 ▼0.7%
- Aircraft movements: 333,290
- Cargo (lbs.): 295,332,989
- Source: Salt Lake City International Airport

Salt Lake City International Airport (IATA: SLC, ICAO: KSLC, FAA LID: SLC) is a joint civil-military international airport located about 4 mi (6.4 km; 3.5 nmi) west of Downtown Salt Lake City, Utah, United States. The airport, along with the much smaller Provo Airport (PVU) and Ogden–Hinckley Airport (OGD) are the closest commercial airports for more than 3 million people and is within a 30-minute drive of nearly 1.3 million jobs. The airport serves as a hub for Delta Air Lines and is a major gateway to the Intermountain West and West Coast. The airport sees 343 scheduled nonstop airline departures per day to 93 cities in North America, South America, Asia, and Europe. It is by far the busiest airport in Utah.

Salt Lake City International Airport continues to rank high for on-time departures/arrivals and the fewest flight cancellations among major US airports. The airport ranked first for on-time departures and arrivals and first for the percentage of cancellations as of April 2017. The airport is owned by the City of Salt Lake City and is administered by the municipal Department of Airports.

In 2024, the airport set an all-time record with 28,364,610 passengers served, a 5.2% increase from 2023.

== History ==
=== 1900 to 1940 ===
In 1911, a site for an air field was chosen on Basque Flats, named for Spanish-French sheep herders who worked the fields in the then-desolate area of the Salt Lake Valley, where a cinder-covered landing was subsequently created. The Great International Aviation Carnival was held the same year and brought aviation pioneers representing Curtiss Aeroplane and Motor Company and a team representing the Wright Brothers to Salt Lake City. World-famous aviator Glenn H. Curtiss brought his newly invented Seaplane to the carnival, a type of airplane that had never been demonstrated to the public. Curtiss took off from the nearby Great Salt Lake, awing the 20,000 spectators and making international headlines.

For several years, the new field was used mainly for training and aerobatic flights. That would change in 1920 when the United States Postal Service (USPS) began air mail service to Salt Lake City. The city bought a 100-acre tract around Basque Flats for $4,000 and built a field, hangar and other facilities. In the same year, the airfield was given the name Woodward Field, named for John P. Woodward, a local aviator. The first transcontinental air mail flight landed at Woodward Field on September 8.

In 1925, the postal service began awarding contracts to private companies. Western Air Express, the first private company to carry U.S. mail, began flying from Salt Lake City to Los Angeles via Las Vegas. Less than a year later, Western Air Express would begin flying passengers along the same route. Western Air Express later became Western Airlines, which had a large hub in Salt Lake City.

Charles Lindbergh visited Woodward Field in 1927, drawing many spectators to see The Spirit of St. Louis. During the next few years the airport would gain another runway and would span over 400 acres (1.6 km^{2}). In 1930 the airport was renamed Salt Lake City Municipal Airport.

The first terminal and airport administration building was built in 1933 at a cost of $52,000. By then, United Airlines had begun serving Salt Lake City on flights between New York City and San Francisco.

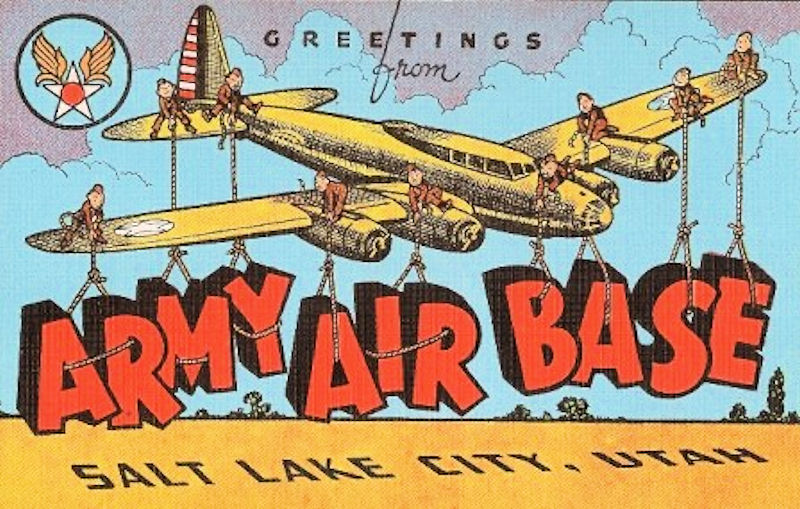
World War II Salt Lake City Army Air Base postcard

As air travel became more popular and the United States Army Air Forces established a base at the airport during World War II, a third runway was added. The April 1957 Official Airline Guide shows 42 weekday departures: 18 on Western, 17 United and 7 Frontier. United had flown nonstop to Chicago since 1950, but nonstop service to New York did not start until 1968. The first jets were United 720s in September 1960.

=== 1960 terminal ===
A new terminal was needed and work began on the west side of the airport on Terminal 1, designed by Brazier Montmorency Hayes & Talbot and dedicated in 1960 after seven years of work and a cost of $8 million. In 1968, the airport became Salt Lake City International Airport when a non-stop route to Calgary, Canada was awarded to Western Airlines.

After airline deregulation in 1978, hub airports appeared. Western Airlines, with ties to Salt Lake City since its inception, increased service into hub status on May 1, 1982.

Terminal 2 was designed by Montmorency Hayes & Talbot and built solely for Western and had several murals by artist LeConte Stewart.

During the 1980s, the airport saw further expansion to both terminals as well as runway extension. In 1987, Western Airlines merged with Delta Air Lines. Salt Lake City would continue to be a major airline hub for Delta.

In 1991, the airport opened a new short-term parking garage. The airport opened a new runway in 1995 along with the International Terminal and E concourse for SkyWest Airlines, which was designed by Gensler. A new 328-foot-tall (100 m) control tower, new approach control facility, and a new fire station were opened in 1999.

In 2001, Concourse E was expanded for additional gates and SkyWest Airlines opened its new maintenance hangar and training facility. In 2002, the airport saw heavy crowds as Salt Lake City welcomed over one million visitors for the Winter Olympics.

In June 2008, Delta Air Lines began service to Charles de Gaulle Airport in Paris on a Boeing 767. This was the airport's first transatlantic route. Delta also added the first flight from Salt Lake City to Asia, a link to Tokyo's Narita Airport, the following June. The service aboard Airbus A330s resulted from Delta's merger with Northwest Airlines, which had a hub at Narita. Later that year, Delta made it seasonal. The airline stopped flying to Tokyo in October 2011.

=== New terminal and concourses ===
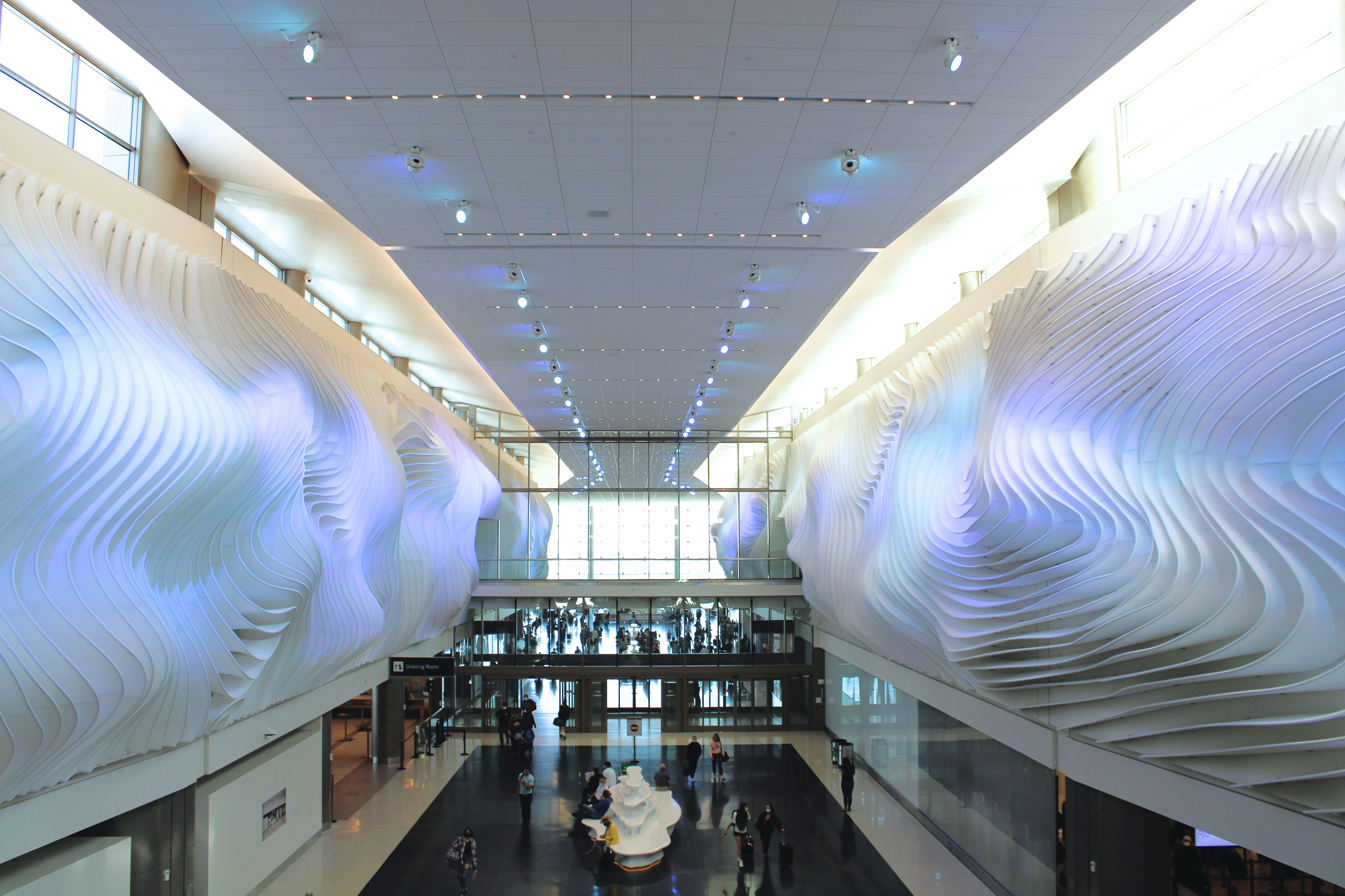
Inside the new terminal

The Airport Redevelopment Program broke ground in 2014, initiating construction of the new SLC terminal complex. This began the process of replacing the existing, aging facilities with all new facilities, including a rental car center, a parking garage, a terminal with two linear concourses (similar to Atlanta, Denver, and Washington–Dulles) with 93 gates (later changed to 94 gates), two tunnels, and an elevated roadway. The construction was funded by airport funds, passenger and customer facility charges, bonds, and federal grants.

The Airport opened Phase 1 of the new terminal in 2020. This first phase consisted of the western portion of Concourse A with 25 gates, and the western portion of Concourse B with 21 gates. The concourses were connected by a mid-field underground tunnel. After Concourse B opened, the old terminals and concourses were demolished, and then construction on Concourses A and B East began. With the opening of the new airport, Delta Air Lines opened a brand new Sky Club in Concourse A, which at the time was the largest in their network.

Phase 2 of the project included the eastern portion of Concourse A with 22 gates and additional concession options. It opened in increments throughout 2023, with the final 13 gates opening on October 31, 2023.

Phase 3 opened on October 22, 2024, including five additional gates in the eastern portion of Concourse B, the Concourse B Plaza, additional concession options and a central "river tunnel". The central tunnel, which allows passengers to directly access Concourse B from just outside the security checkpoint, reduced walk times to Concourse B by as much as half. The Concourse B Plaza includes the reinstalled floor world map that was featured in the former terminal, as well as a 30-foot-long replica of an allosaurus fossil.

The remaining 5 gates of Phase 3 and first 5 gates of Phase 4 opened in the eastern portion of Concourse B in October 2025. Along with the new gates and concessions, a second Delta Sky Club and the airport's only non-airline specific club, an American Express Centurion Lounge were opened.

Phase 4 includes the airport's first non-Delta club, a United Airlines club on the far east end of Concourse B. The easternmost 11 gates of Concourse B, also part of Phase 4, opened on October 27, 2026, and completed the Airport Development Program. All told, Phase 2 through Phase 4 added 48 new gates to the airport for a total of 94 gates. Future plans call for adding a people mover to the central tunnel when a future Concourse C is eventually built.

== Facilities ==
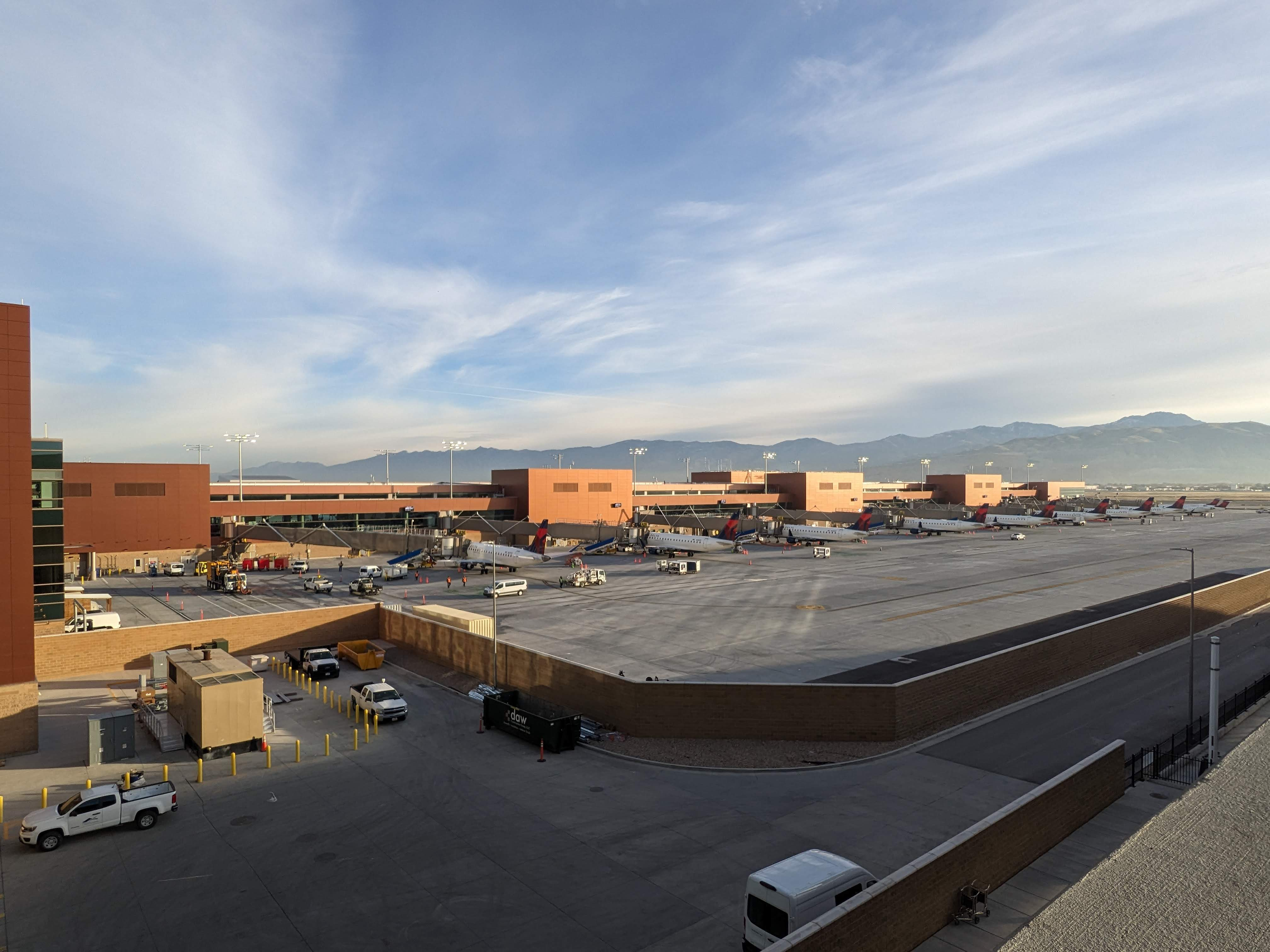
Delta Air Lines aircraft parked along Concourse A

The airport covers 7,700 acres (3,116 ha) and has three runways. The runways are oriented in a NNW/SSE magnetic direction due to consistent prevailing winds in this direction.

=== Terminal ===
SLC has a single terminal with two concourses connected by two underground tunnels for a total of 83 gates. There is a single security check point with 16 lanes and 11 baggage carousels, with additional checkpoint and carousel facilities for international arrivals.

- Concourse A has 47 gates.
- Concourse B has 47 gates.

=== Ground transportation ===
The airport is accessible from I-80 at exit 115 B or from I-215 at exits 22 and 22 B, with the GA terminal accessible from I-215 exit 23. The airport can also be accessed from North Temple Street and Utah State Route 154 (Bangerter Highway), both of which terminate and merge into the airport's Terminal Drive.

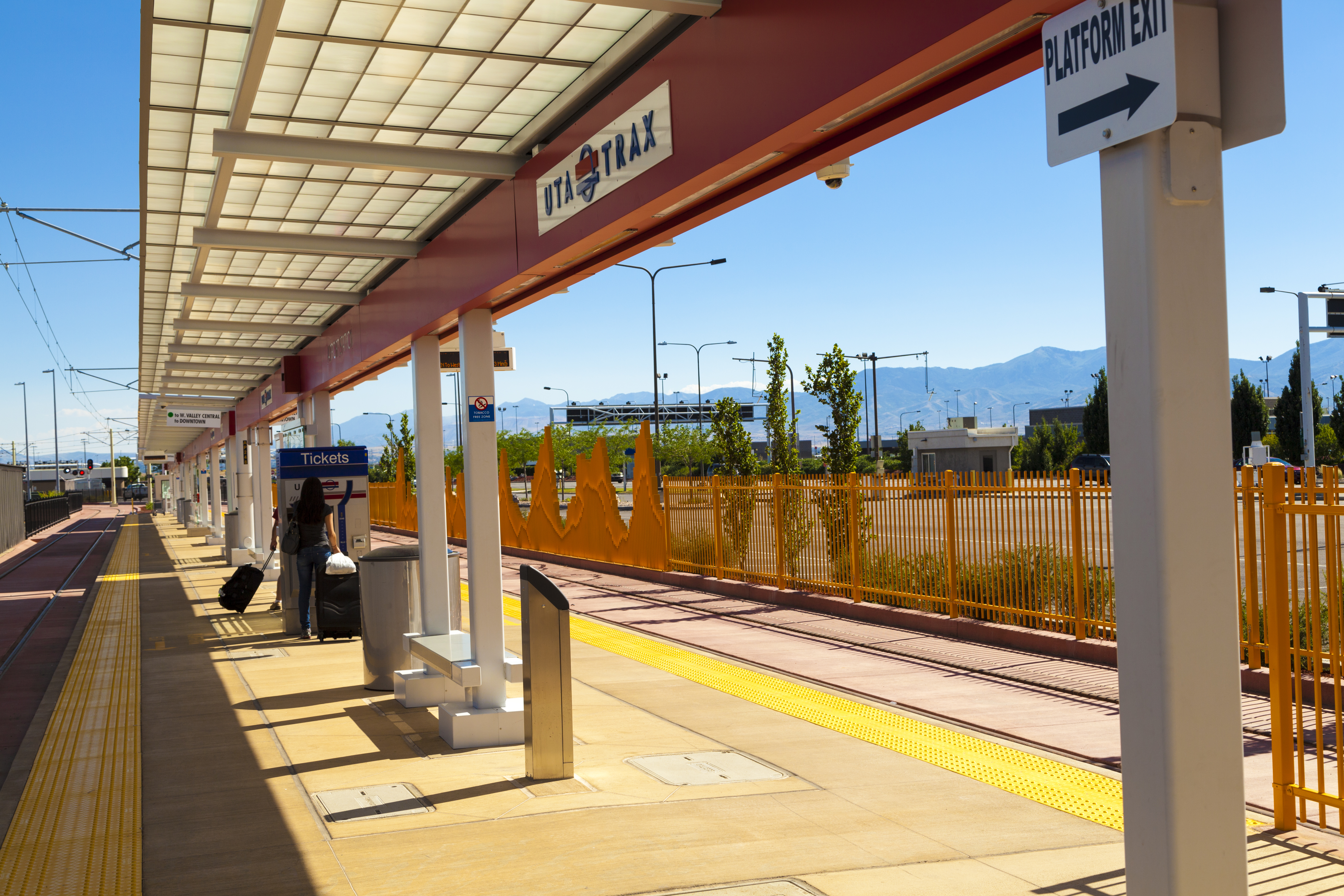
The Airport TRAX station, prior to being moved to the new terminal

Rail and bus services that connect the surrounding region to Salt Lake City International Airport include TRAX light rail service from the Airport station, UTA bus service (via TRAX), and FrontRunner commuter rail (via TRAX).

There is a pedestrian and bicycle trail on the south side of the runways connecting the airport and urban Salt Lake City, which is open to the public during daylight and early evening hours year round and accessible at other times to persons possessing an airport badge.

=== General aviation ===
Despite being the 28th busiest airport in the world in terms of aircraft operations, the airport still maintains a large general aviation presence. In 2008, 19% of aircraft movements at the airport came from general aviation traffic. This is in contrast to most large airports, which encourage general aviation aircraft to use smaller or less busy airports in order to prevent delays to commercial traffic. The airport is able to effectively handle both commercial and general aviation traffic largely in part to the airport's layout and airspace structure. Nearly all general aviation operations are conducted on the east side of the airport, away from commercial traffic. Additionally, smaller and relatively slower general aviation aircraft arrive and depart the airport in ways that generally do not hinder the normal flow of arriving or departing commercial aircraft.

In 2021, there were 337 general aviation aircraft based at the airport. The airport has three fixed-base operators; Signature Flight Support, Atlantic Aviation, and Menzies Aviation located on the east side of the airport. The airport has facilities for air ambulance, law enforcement, as well as state and federal government aircraft. Additionally, the airport is home to several flight training facilities.

=== Military operations ===
The Utah Air National Guard operates what was previously named the Salt Lake City Air National Guard Base on the east side of the airport. In November 2014, the installation was renamed the Roland R. Wright Air National Guard Base after Brigadier General Roland R. Wright, USAF (Ret).

The base occupies approximately 140 acres as a U.S. Government cantonment area leased from the airport. In addition to flight line, the installation comprises 65 buildings: 3 services, 13 administrative, and 47 industrial. There are 255 full-time Air Reserve Technician and Active Guard and Reserve personnel assigned, augmented by 1,343 part-time traditional air national guardsmen. The host wing for the installation is the 151st Wing (151 WG), an Air Mobility Command (AMC)-gained unit operating the KC-135R Stratotanker.

== Airlines and destinations ==
=== Passenger ===
Airlines	Destinations
Aeroméxico	Guadalajara
Air Canada Rouge	Seasonal: Toronto–Pearson
Alaska Airlines	Honolulu, Portland (OR), San Diego, Seattle/Tacoma; Seasonal: Anchorage
American Airlines	Charlotte, Chicago–O'Hare, Dallas/Fort Worth, Philadelphia, Phoenix–Sky Harbor; Seasonal: Miami
American Eagle	Phoenix–Sky Harbor; Seasonal: Chicago–O'Hare, Los Angeles
Delta Air Lines	Amsterdam, Atlanta, Austin, Baltimore, Billings, Boise, Boston, Bozeman, Burbank, Cancún, Charlotte, Chicago–O'Hare, Cincinnati, Cleveland, Columbus–Glenn, Dallas/Fort Worth, Denver, Detroit, Fort Lauderdale, Glacier Park/Kalispell, Honolulu, Houston–Intercontinental, Idaho Falls, Indianapolis, Jackson Hole, Kahului, Kansas City, Las Vegas, London–Heathrow, Long Beach, Los Angeles, Memphis, Mexico City–Benito Juárez, Miami, Milwaukee, Minneapolis/St. Paul, Missoula, Nashville, New Orleans, New York–JFK, Newark, Ontario, Orange County, Orlando, Paris–Charles de Gaulle, Philadelphia, Phoenix–Sky Harbor, Pittsburgh, Portland (OR), Puerto Vallarta, Raleigh/Durham, Reno/Tahoe, Sacramento, San Antonio, San Diego, San Francisco, San Jose (CA), San José del Cabo, Seattle/Tacoma, Seoul–Incheon, Spokane, St. Louis, Tampa, Tri-Cities (WA), Washington–Dulles, Washington–National; Seasonal: Anchorage, Fort Myers, Kailua-Kona, Lima, New York–LaGuardia, Toronto–Pearson, Vancouver
Delta Connection	Albuquerque, Austin, Billings, Boise, Bozeman, Burbank, Butte, Calgary, Cedar City, Colorado Springs, Elko, Eugene, Fayetteville/Bentonville, Flagstaff (begins June 7, 2027), Fresno, Glacier Park/Kalispell, Grand Junction, Great Falls, Helena, Idaho Falls, Jackson Hole, Lewiston, Little Rock, Long Beach, Medford, Missoula, Moab, Monterey (begins December 19, 2026), Oakland, Oklahoma City, Omaha, Ontario, Orange County, Palm Springs, Pocatello, Redmond/Bend, Reno/Tahoe, San Jose (CA), Santa Barbara, Santa Rosa, St. George (UT), Spokane, Sun Valley, Tri-Cities (WA), Tucson, Tulsa, Twin Falls, Vancouver; Seasonal: West Yellowstone
Frontier Airlines	Chicago–O'Hare, Dallas/Fort Worth, Denver, Las Vegas, Los Angeles, Orange County, Orlando, Phoenix–Sky Harbor, Portland (OR), San Diego, San Francisco, Seattle/Tacoma, Tucson
JetBlue	New York–JFK; Seasonal: Boston
JSX	Seasonal: Las Vegas, Scottsdale
KLM	Seasonal: Amsterdam
Southwest Airlines	Austin, Baltimore, Chicago–Midway, Dallas–Love, Denver, Houston–Hobby, Las Vegas, Long Beach, Los Angeles, Nashville, Oakland, Phoenix–Sky Harbor, Sacramento, San Diego, San Jose (CA); Seasonal: Orlando, Tampa
Sun Country Airlines	Phoenix/Mesa (begins April 15, 2027); Seasonal: Minneapolis/St. Paul
United Airlines	Chicago–O'Hare, Denver, Houston–Intercontinental, Newark, San Francisco, Washington–Dulles
United Express	Denver, Houston–Intercontinental, Los Angeles, San Francisco; Seasonal: Chicago–O'Hare
Volaris	Guadalajara
WestJet	Seasonal: Edmonton

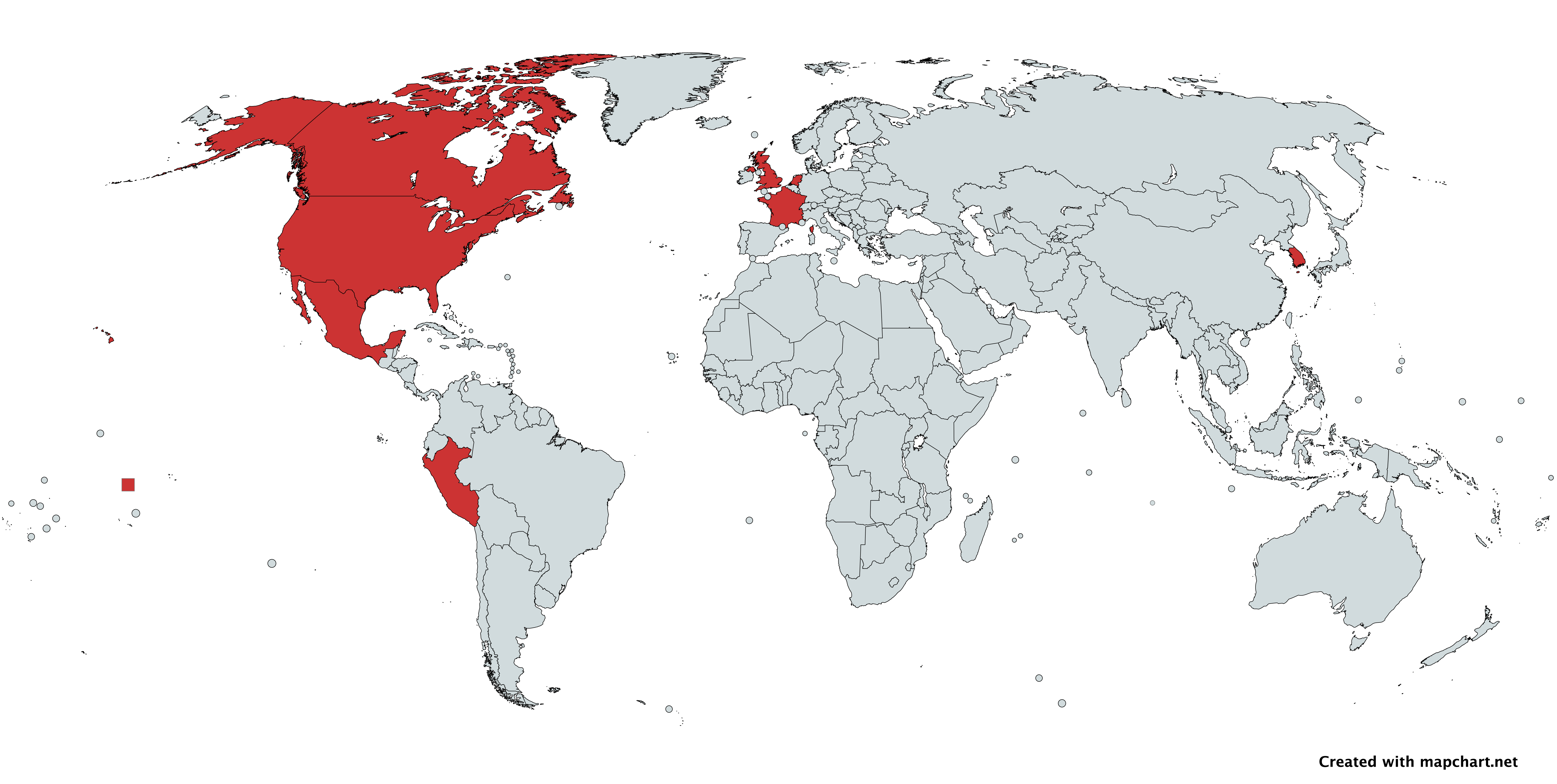
Salt Lake City International Airport passenger destinations

== Statistics ==
=== Annual traffic ===
SLC Airport Annual Passengers (2007–Present)
Year	Passengers	Year	Passengers
2007	22,045,333	2017	24,199,351
2008	20,790,400	2018	25,554,244
2009	20,432,218	2019	26,808,014
2010	20,901,533	2020	12,559,026
2011	20,389,474	2021	22,378,989
2012	20,102,078	2022	25,752,783
2013	20,186,474	2023	26,952,754
2014	21,141,610	2024	28,364,610
2015	22,141,026	2025	28,158,007
2016	23,155,527	2026	

=== Top destinations ===
Busiest domestic routes from SLC (June 2025 – May 2026)
Rank	Airport	Passengers	Carriers
1	Denver, Colorado	913,455	Delta, Frontier, Southwest, United
2	Phoenix–Sky Harbor, Arizona	643,590	American, Delta, Frontier, Southwest
3	Seattle/Tacoma, Washington	553,712	Alaska, Delta
4	Los Angeles, California	552,673	Alaska, American, Delta, Southwest, United
5	Dallas/Fort Worth, Texas	529,734	American, Delta, Frontier
6	Atlanta, Georgia	507,531	Delta, Frontier
7	Las Vegas, Nevada	502,679	Delta, Frontier, Southwest
8	San Diego, California	381,636	Alaska, Delta, Frontier
9	Chicago-O'Hare, Illinois	375,039	Alaska, Delta, United
10	San Francisco, California	351,418	Alaska, Delta, Frontier, United

Busiest international routes from SLC (June 2025 – May 2026)
Rank	Airport	Passengers	Carriers
1	Amsterdam, Netherlands	226,130	Delta, KLM
2	Paris–Charles de Gaulle, France	168,165	Delta
3	Cancún, Mexico	151,286	Delta
4	Seoul–Incheon, South Korea	126,776	Delta
5	San José del Cabo, Mexico	121,310	Delta
6	Vancouver, Canada	99,090	Delta
7	Guadalajara, Mexico	96,018	Aeroméxico
8	London–Heathrow, United Kingdom	91,637	Delta
9	Mexico City–Benito Juárez, Mexico	91,911	Delta, Aeroméxico
10	Calgary, Canada	88,471	Delta Connection

=== Airline market share ===
Airline market share (June 2025 - May 2026)
Rank	Carrier	Passengers	Share
1	Delta Air Lines	18,790,075	69.5%
2	Southwest Airlines	2,681,551	9.9%
3	United Airlines	1,614,208	6.0%
4	American Airlines	1,492,142	5.5%
5	Frontier Airlines	1,069,800	4.0%
6	Other Airlines	1,383,354	5.1%

== Accidents and incidents ==
- On October 7, 1935 United Airlines Flight 4, a Boeing 247D, crashed after departing Salt Lake City en route to Cheyenne, Wyoming. All 12 on board were killed, including a fugitive traveling under the assumed name of a man killed in a separate plane crash a few days before. Former President Herbert Hoover narrowly avoided being on Flight 4.
- On May 1, 1942, United Airlines Trip 4, a Douglas DC-3 impacted the side of a hill after deviating off course 3.8 miles (6.1 km) NE of Salt Lake Municipal Airport, all 17 on board were killed.
- On January 17, 1963, a West Coast Airlines Fairchild F-27 on a training flight out and back to SLC crashed west of the airport into Great Salt Lake simulating an emergency descent, all three occupants perished.
- On November 11, 1965, United Airlines Flight 227, operated with a Boeing 727, crashed just short of the runway at Salt Lake City International Airport (then named Salt Lake City Municipal Airport), killing 43 of the 91 people on board.
- On December 16, 1969, an Aero Commander 1121 Jet Commander operated by American Smelting and Refining Co. lifted off prematurely, stalled and crashed. Both occupants died.
- On December 18, 1977, United Airlines Flight 2860, a cargo flight operated with a Douglas DC-8 crashed into a mountain near Kaysville while in a holding pattern prior to landing at Salt Lake City International Airport. The crew was trying to figure out an electrical problem and did not realize they were adjacent to a mountain. All three people on board were killed in the accident.
- On January 15, 1987, Skywest Airlines Flight 1834, a Fairchild Metro, collided with a Mooney M20 at 7000 feet while the Metro was on a runway 34 approach. Both aircraft fell and crashed to the ground. All eight on the Metro and two on the Mooney were killed.
- On October 14, 1989, Delta Air Lines Flight 1554, operated with a Boeing 727, caught fire during the boarding process for a flight to Edmonton, Alberta, Canada while the aircraft was parked at a gate. Of the 22 people who were on the aircraft at the time, five sustained minor injuries. While all passengers and crew evacuated, the aircraft was destroyed. An investigation determined the fire started due to a malfunction with the passenger oxygen system.
- On March 2, 1997, a Beechcraft Super King Air operated by Coast Hotels and Casinos impacted terrain 1.5 miles (2.4 km) south of SLC. One passenger out of the four on board died.
- On November 16, 2015, three days after the 2015 Paris terror attacks, an Air France Airbus A380 traveling from Los Angeles to Paris was diverted to Salt Lake City International Airport due to a bomb threat on the aircraft. The aircraft was the largest plane to ever land at the airport. The airport workers had only 15 minutes to get ready for the emergency landing.
- On January 18, 2016, two people died when their Cessna 525 private jet crashed shortly after take-off from Salt Lake City International on their way to Tucson International Airport in Tucson, Arizona.
- On March 30, 2021, a chartered Delta Air Lines Boeing 757 carrying the NBA's Utah Jazz to Memphis International Airport in Memphis, Tennessee for a game against the Memphis Grizzlies made an emergency landing at SLC after suffering a bird strike shortly after takeoff. The plane suffered damage to an engine but there were no injuries among its occupants.

== See also ==
- Ogden-Hinckley Airport
- Provo Municipal Airport
- Spanish Fork Municipal Airport Woodhouse Field
- Heber Valley Airport
- South Valley Regional Airport
- St. George Regional Airport
- Utah World War II Army Airfields
- List of airports in Utah
- List of tallest air traffic control towers in the United States
