= KSPK =

KSPK may refer to:

- KSPK-FM, a radio station (102.3 FM) licensed to serve Walsenburg, Colorado, United States
- KSPK-LD, a low-power television station (channel 28) licensed to serve Walsenburg, Colorado
- Spanish Fork Municipal Airport Woodhouse Field (ICAO code KSPK)
