= Mesa Gateway Airport =

Airport in Mesa, Arizona, United States, serving the Greater Phoenix area

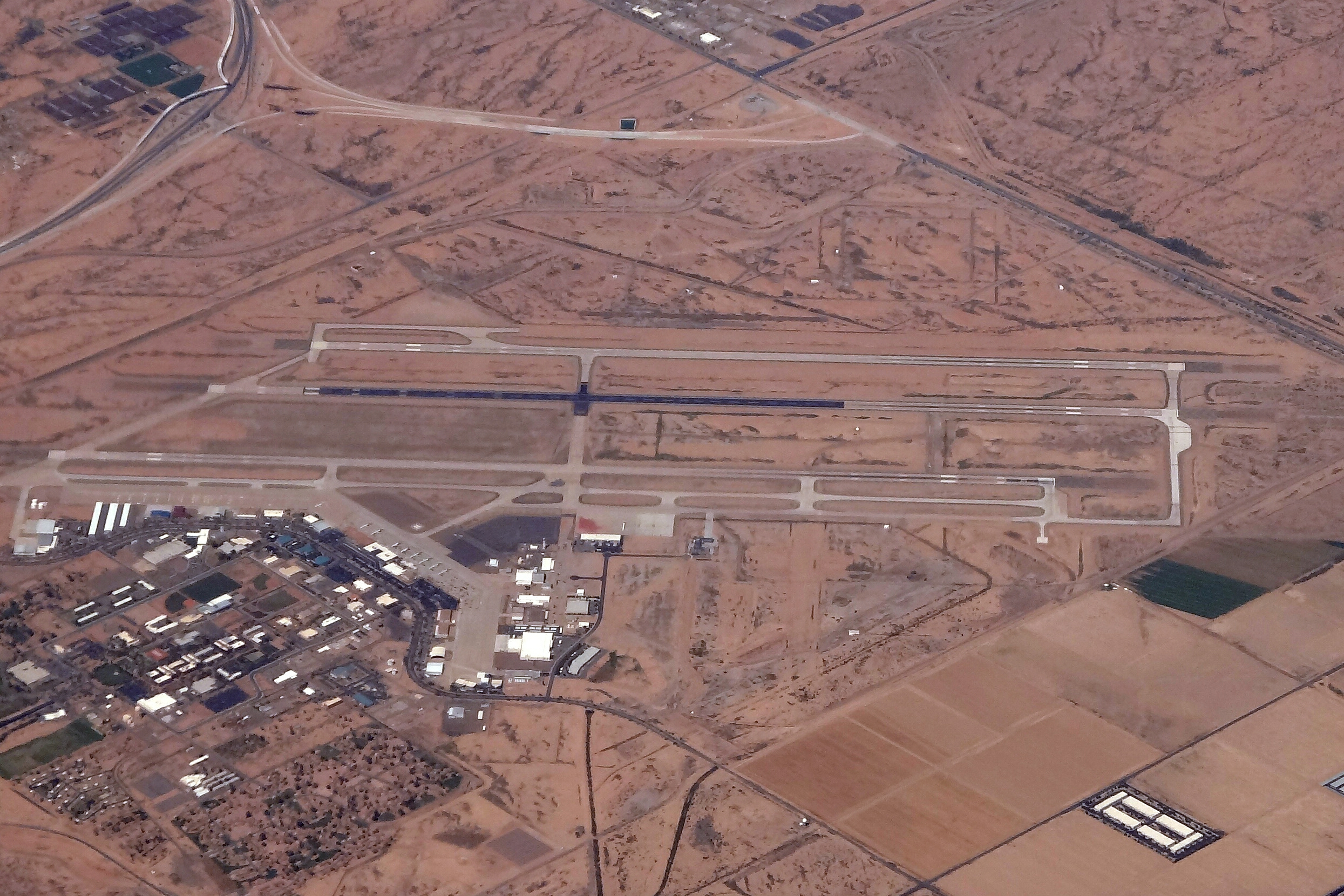
- Aerial view of Mesa Gateway Airport
- IATA: AZA; ICAO: KIWA; FAA LID: IWA

Summary
- Airport type: Public
- Owner/Operator: Mesa Gateway Airport Authority
- Serves: Phoenix metropolitan area
- Location: Mesa, Arizona
- Operating base for: Allegiant Air
- Built: 1941
- Elevation AMSL: 1,384 ft (422 m)
- Coordinates: 33°18′28″N 111°39′20″W
- Website: gatewayairport.com

Maps
- FAA airport diagram
- Interactive map of Mesa Gateway Airport

Runways
Direction	Length		Surface
Direction	ft	m	Surface
12C/30C	10,201	3,109	Asphalt/Concrete
12L/30R	9,300	2,835	Concrete
12R/30L	10,401	3,170	Concrete

Statistics (2025)
- Aircraft operations (2024): 309,103
- Total Passengers: 2,035,505 ▲7.9%
- Source: Federal Aviation Administration

Mesa Gateway Airport (Note: formerly Phoenix–Mesa Gateway Airport (2008–2024), Williams Gateway Airport (1994–2008) and Williams Air Force Base (1948–1993)) (IATA: AZA, ICAO: KIWA, FAA LID: IWA) – also known as Phoenix–Mesa Airport – is an airport in southeastern Mesa, Arizona, located approximately 20 miles (17 nmi; 32 km) southeast of Phoenix, in Maricopa County. The airport, owned and operated by the Mesa Gateway Airport Authority, is a reliever airport for Phoenix Sky Harbor International Airport. It is a base for Allegiant Air.

The FAA's National Plan of Integrated Airport Systems for 2007–2011 called Mesa Gateway a reliever airport, which is a general aviation airport used to relieve congestion at a large airline airport. Allegiant Air began scheduled service from Mesa in October 2007. Mesa Gateway Airport reports the airport had 1,772,678 passenger boardings in 2019.

Although most U.S. airports use the same three-letter location identifier for the FAA and IATA, Mesa Gateway Airport has different codes for each. The aviation community generally uses the FAA code of IWA, while commercial passenger-flight organizations use the IATA code of AZA.

== History ==
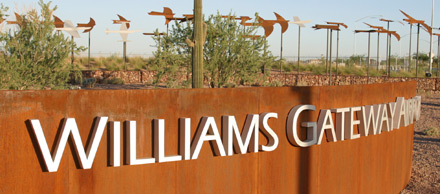
A sign at the airport's entrance, showing the former name

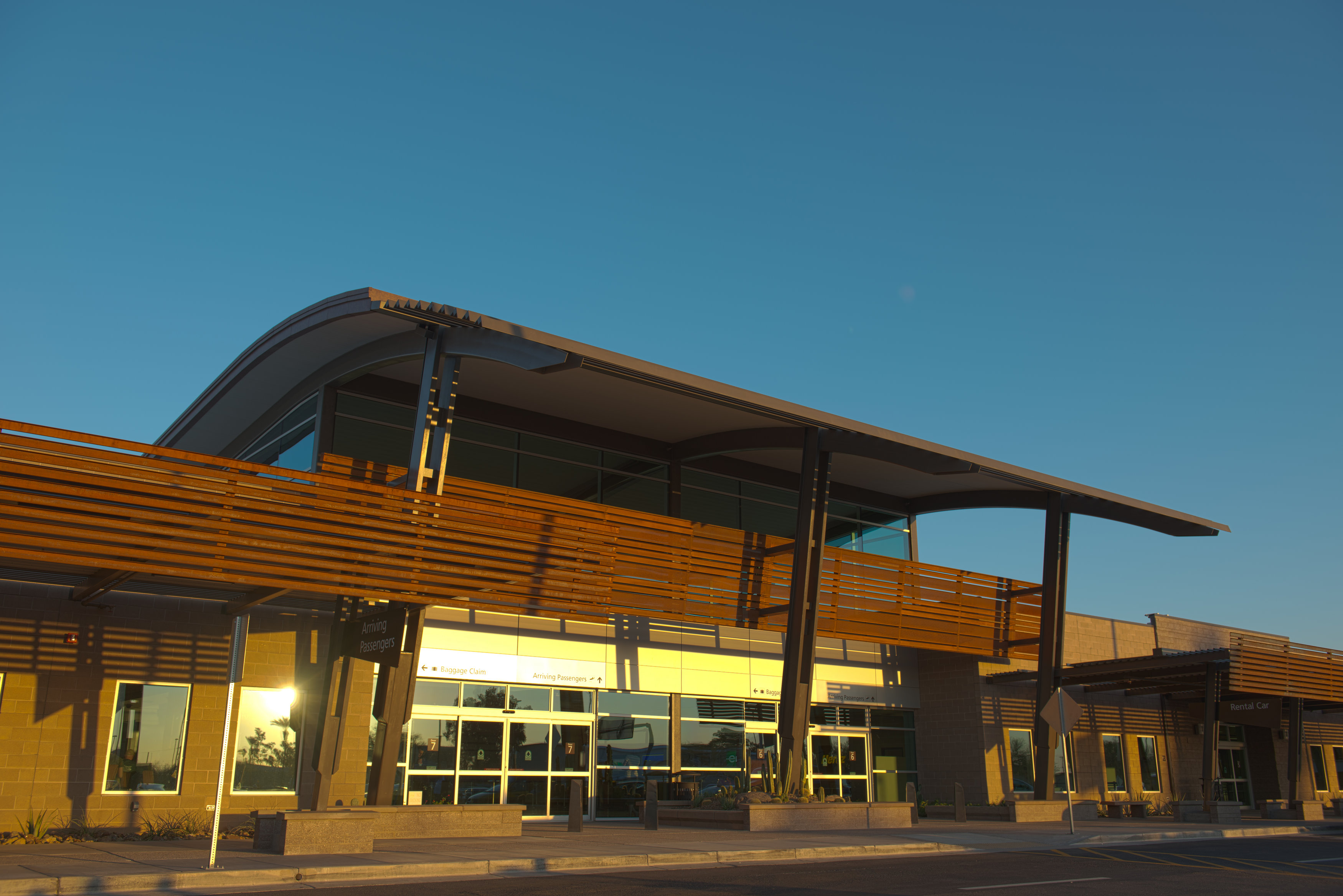
The airport's baggage-claim facility

The airport was built in 1941 as Higley Field. It was renamed Williams Field on February 24, 1942, in honor of Arizona native First Lieutenant Charles Linton Williams (1898–1927), who was killed while serving with the 19th Pursuit Squadron at Wheeler Field, Oahu, when he had to ditch his Boeing PW-9A, 26-353, in the Pacific Ocean about a mile off of Fort DeRussy. The fort was located in the Territory of Hawaii (Hawaii would become a state in 1959). In 1948, Williams Field was acquired by the US military and renamed Williams Air Base. It was a flight-training field during World War II.

In 1948, Williams became the first jet training base. In 1966, it was the first site of the Undergraduate Pilot Training program. The 1991 Base Realignment and Closure Commission recommended closing the base, and it closed in 1993.

As the base was being shut down, growing traffic at Sky Harbor International Airport in Phoenix was figured to warrant an alternative airport. The runway was expanded to accommodate airliners, and the facility opened in 1994 as Williams Gateway Airport. Bids were submitted by some airlines to begin flights almost immediately.

In 2004, charter airline Ryan International Airlines began MD-82 flights to Bullhead City International Airport in Bullhead City, Arizona, next to Laughlin, Nevada, and many resorts. Shortly thereafter, the airport once again became a flight training center to take advantage of the area's clear weather.

On July 31, 2007, the low-cost Las Vegas–based carrier Allegiant Air announced plans to open a focus city at Phoenix–Mesa Gateway Airport, connecting the Phoenix area to 13 cities. Service commenced on October 25, 2007, with cities being added until November 21, 2007. In a September 17, 2007, press release, the Williams Gateway Airport Authority governing board approved a name change for Williams Gateway Airport effective October 15 to Phoenix–Mesa Gateway Airport.

On June 16, 2015, after Elite Airways announced non-stop flights from San Diego and Salt Lake City to Phoenix–Mesa, Allegiant threatened to leave the airport. This was primarily due to the incentives the airport offered to Elite. If Allegiant were to leave, it would consider relocating to the nearby Phoenix Sky Harbor International Airport.

On January 21, 2017, Phoenix–Mesa welcomed its first international flight and first two international destinations, as WestJet inaugurated its seasonal service to Calgary and Edmonton, Alberta. WestJet had seen success at Phoenix Sky Harbor for years, with Calgary and Edmonton being the first- and sixth-most popular international destinations at Sky Harbor, respectively. From Mesa, WestJet flew nonstop to Calgary; its subsidiary Swoop flew nonstop to Edmonton and Winnipeg. In May 2023, it was announced that WestJet and Swoop would not return for seasonal flights for the 2023–24 season, citing low profitability. A third Canadian airline, ultra-low-cost carrier Flair Airlines, previously announced in March 2023 that it would move its Phoenix–Canada operations to Sky Harbor in October.

On May 3, 2021, Phoenix–Mesa Gateway welcomed Avelo Airlines, which is based at Hollywood Burbank Airport. The service was short-lived and the airline's final flight to/from Phoenix–Mesa was on August 16, 2021.

In 2022, a new control tower was added to help with increased air traffic to the airport.

On December 17, 2024, following Phoenix's withdrawal from the Phoenix-Mesa Gateway Airport Authority, the board voted to officially change the airport's name to Mesa Gateway Airport.

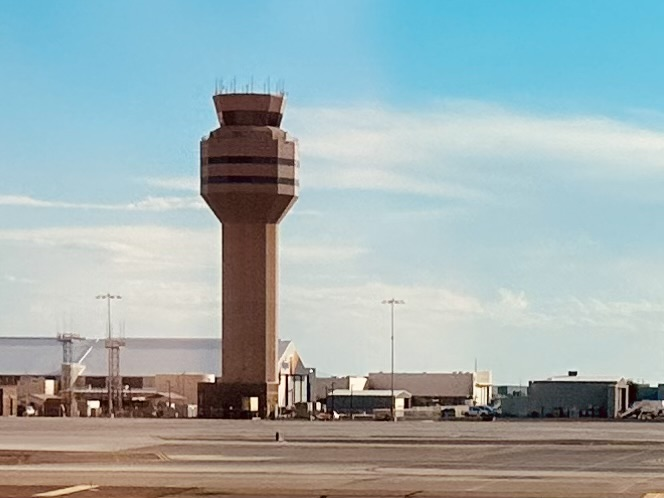
Mesa Gateway Airport's control tower

== Board of directors ==
In 1994, the Phoenix–Mesa Gateway Airport Authority was established with a three-member board with representation from the three cities immediately adjacent to the then-named Williams Field. The original governing board consisted of the mayors of the towns of Gilbert and Queen Creek and the city of Mesa. Reflecting the growth of the airport, the Gila River Indian Community joined the board in 1995, with the cities of Phoenix and Apache Junction subsequently joining in 2006 and 2013.

== Facilities ==
The airport covers 3,020 acres (1,220 ha) and has three parallel paved runways:

- 12C/30C: 10,201 ft × 150 ft (3,109 m × 46 m), asphalt/concrete
- 12L/30R: 9,300 ft × 150 ft (2,835 m × 46 m), concrete
- 12R/30L: 10,401 ft × 150 ft (3,170 m × 46 m), concrete

== Airlines and destinations ==
=== Passenger ===
Airlines	Destinations
Allegiant Air	Appleton, Bellingham, Billings, Bismarck, Boise, Bloomington/Normal, Bozeman, Cedar Rapids/Iowa City, Chicago/Rockford, Cincinnati, Colorado Springs, Des Moines, Eugene, Fargo, Fayetteville/Bentonville, Flint, Fort Wayne, Glacier Park/Kalispell, Grand Forks, Grand Island, Grand Rapids, Idaho Falls, La Crosse, Las Vegas, Minneapolis/St. Paul (begins April 14, 2027), Minot, Missoula, Moline/Quad Cities, Orange County, Omaha, Peoria, Provo, Rapid City, Sioux Falls, South Bend, Spokane, Springfield/Branson, St. Cloud, Tri-Cities (WA), Wichita; Seasonal: Grand Forks, Great Falls, Portland (OR), Traverse City
Sun Country Airlines	Salt Lake City (begins April 15, 2027); Seasonal: Minneapolis/St. Paul (ends April 13, 2027)

Destinations map
Destinations from Mesa Gateway Airport
Red = Year-round destination
Green = Seasonal destination
Blue = Future destination

=== Other ===
- Air Evac International (Medevac airline)
- Fighter Combat International

=== Training ===
- Advanced Training Systems International
- ATP Flight School
- Aviation Performance Solutions
- University of North Dakota Aerospace Foundation
- Chandler–Gilbert Community College

== Statistics ==
=== Top destinations ===
Busiest domestic routes from AZA (February 2025 – January 2026)
Rank	City	Passengers	Carrier(s)
1	Provo, Utah	117,400	Allegiant
2	Sioux Falls, South Dakota	59,720	Allegiant
3	Fargo, North Dakota	59,480	Allegiant
4	Appleton, Wisconsin	41,290	Allegiant
5	Bismarck, North Dakota	37,110	Allegiant
6	Grand Rapids, Michigan	35,620	Allegiant
7	Idaho Falls, Idaho	34,410	Allegiant
8	Peoria, Illinois	33,510	Allegiant
9	Cedar Rapids/Iowa City, Iowa	32,710	Allegiant
10	Springfield/Branson, Missouri	32,230	Allegiant

=== Annual traffic ===
Total yearly traffic at AZA (2001–2025)
Year	Passengers	Year	Passengers	Year	Passengers
2001	—N/a	2011	953,337	2021	1,532,150
2002	—N/a	2012	1,382,070	2022	1,888,410
2003	—N/a	2013	1,359,032	2023	1,875,300
2004	—N/a	2014	1,240,993	2024	1,886,055
2005	—N/a	2015	1,281,741	2025	2,035,505
2006	—N/a	2016	1,351,827	2026	TBA
2007	—N/a	2017	1,360,713		
2008	350,661	2018	1,526,578		
2009	573,480	2019	1,772,678		
2010	799,674	2020	1,149,657		

=== Airline market share ===
Top airlines at AZA (February 2025 – January 2026)
Rank	Airline	Passengers	Market Share
1	Allegiant Airlines	1,987,000	98.11%
2	Sun Country Airlines	38,230	1.89%

== Future plans ==
The number of passengers has increased greatly since Allegiant Air started operations. IWA/AZA did not anticipate this growth within the first year. Due to an increase from 14,588 enplanements in 2007 to 159,481 in 2008, facilities were becoming crowded. To alleviate this problem, extensive renovations and expansions were completed within the existing west side terminal, adding nearly 70,000 square feet (6,500 m^{2}) of new space. This added eight gates since IWA/AZA was established in 1994. The airport broke ground on an expansion plan in early 2013, to increase gates to ten. However, because IWA/AZA is running out of real estate on the west side of the airfield, a halt to further expansions will occur until East terminal facilities are built.

=== East Side Terminal plans ===
In response to the expansion issues, PMGAA began planning for a new east terminal. The plan, titled Gateway 2030, was developed in June 2012. The Gateway 2030 plan outlines the process, major findings, and recommendations associated with the cost feasible phasing approach to the development of approximately 700 acres (280 ha) of airport property and the supporting city infrastructure critical to ensure its success" (IWA, 2012b). The plan will be implemented in four phases. With the completion of phase one, IWA/AZA will be able to accommodate 1.5 million enplanements (3 million passengers). Much of phase one will address infrastructure for the new terminal. The addition will include access roads, parking, taxiways, aprons capable of Group III and IV aircraft, and the new 300,000 square feet (28,000 m^{2}) pier concept terminal. The new terminal will have 14 gates, constructed to make room for 12 Group III aircraft and two Group IV aircraft.

Phase two has yet to be planned in detail, but will add another pier terminal to the main concourse, adding up to six gates, parking for 10,500 vehicles, and a 1,000 feet (300 m) extension of RW 12L/30R. Phase two will enable IWA/AZA to handle 2.2 million enplanements. Phase three for the Gateway 2030 plan will add another pier terminal and second level to the main concourse and will create an additional eight gates, a new apron, more parking, and an additional taxiway.

Phase three will focus on privately owned retail, office, and hotel buildings that will be located on airport property. Phase three will allow IWA to accommodate 5 million enplanements.

Phase four will complete the 2030 plan, allowing IWA able to handle 10 million enplanements (20 million passengers) annually with a total of 60 gates and 21,000 vehicle parking spaces. Phase four will likely not be undertaken until 2030 or beyond, making cost estimates nearly impossible.

Due to the changing market, phase two, three, and four are likely to change. Gateway 2030 is estimated to cost more than $1.4 billion.

=== Private Development ===
On November 9, 2021, Gulfstream Aerospace Corporation announced that the airport would be the site for the West Coast Service Center Maintenance, Repair and Overhaul (MRO) facility. The construction cost would be more than $100 million and include a 225,000-square-foot (20,900 m^{2}) facility in Phase One.

On July 14, 2022, Virgin Galactic announced it had signed a long-term lease for a new final assembly manufacturing facility for its next-generation Delta class spaceships. The facility will be capable of producing up to six spaceships per year and will bring hundreds of highly skilled aerospace engineering and manufacturing jobs to the area.

== Ground transportation ==
By road, the airport terminal is served by Sossaman Road. Travelers can access Sossaman Road by exiting at either Hawes or Power Road, which are fed by the Arizona State Route Loop 202, and turning onto Ray Road.

There are several taxis, limousine, ride share and shuttle companies to local hotels, the nearby ASU Polytechnic Campus and downtown Mesa. Multiple car rental agencies are available inside of the arrivals lobby.

Valley Metro bus route 184 stops at the terminal building before heading north to Mesa.

Travelers can park at the hourly or daily parking lots and walk to the terminal. There is also an economy lot, south of the airfield, which is served by a complimentary shuttle to the main terminal.

== Historic landmarks ==
Williams Air Force Base (now part of Mesa Gateway Airport) in Mesa, Arizona
(NRHP = National Register of Historic Places)
(MHP = Mesa Historic Properties)
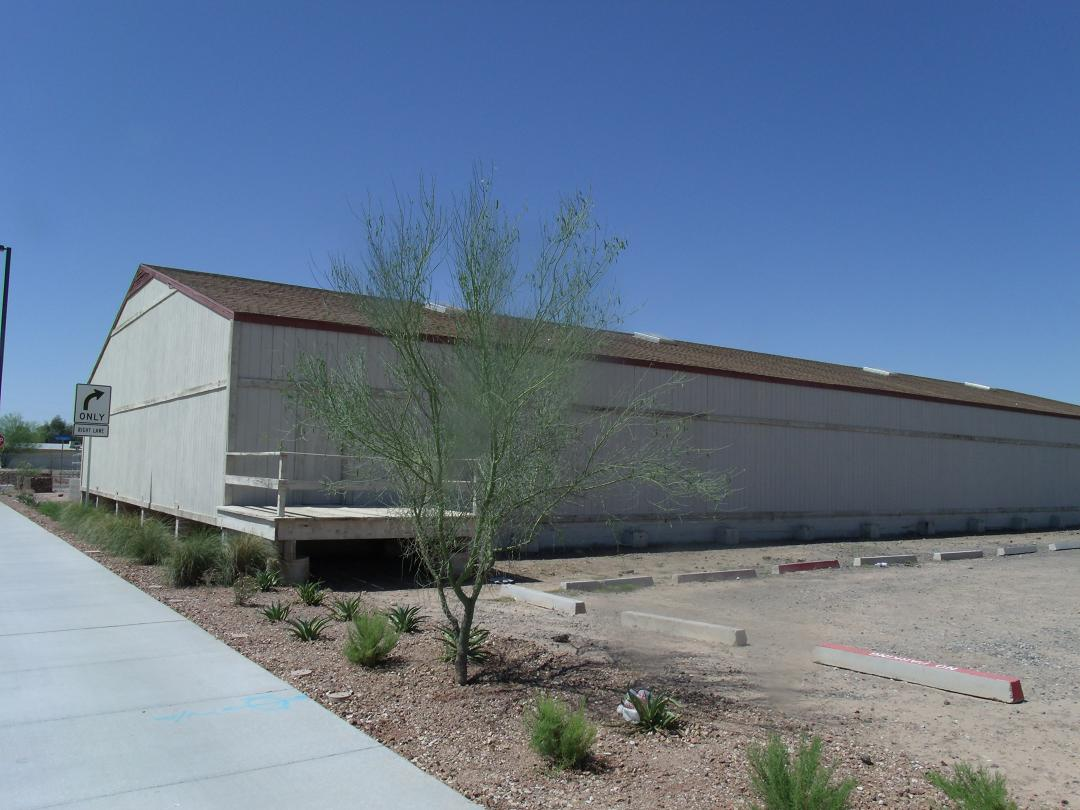
Housing Storage Supply Warehouse at Williams Air Force Base (now Arizona State University at the Polytechnic campus), constructed in December 1941 by the Del E. Webb Construction Company. The warehouse is significant for its association with the construction of Williams Air Force Base on the land on which Mesa Gateway Airport and the Arizona State University at the Polytechnic campus are now located. Listed in the National Register of Historic Places – 1995. Reference 95000746.

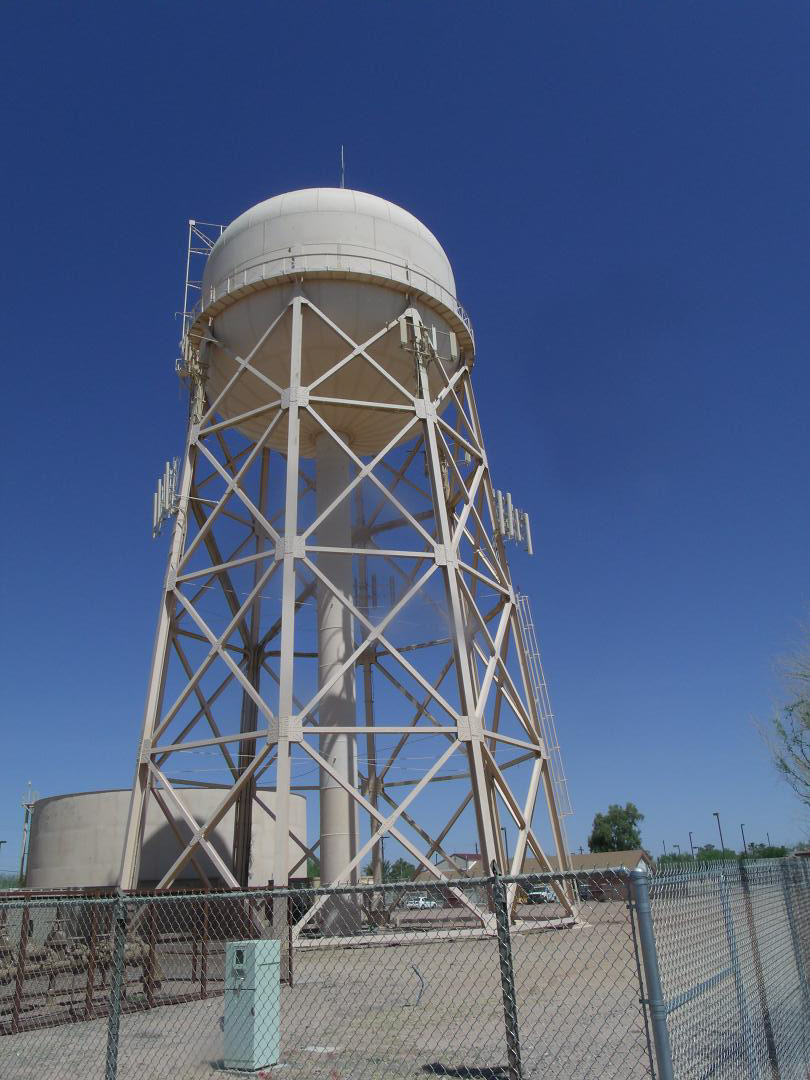
Water Tower at Williams Air Force Base (now Arizona State University at the Polytechnic campus). The water tower was constructed in the winter of 1941–1942 by the Del E. Webb Construction Company. It was part of the historical Williams Air Force Base on the land on which Mesa Gateway Airport and the Arizona State University at the Polytechnic campus are now located. Listed in the National Register of Historic Places – 1995. Reference 95000745.

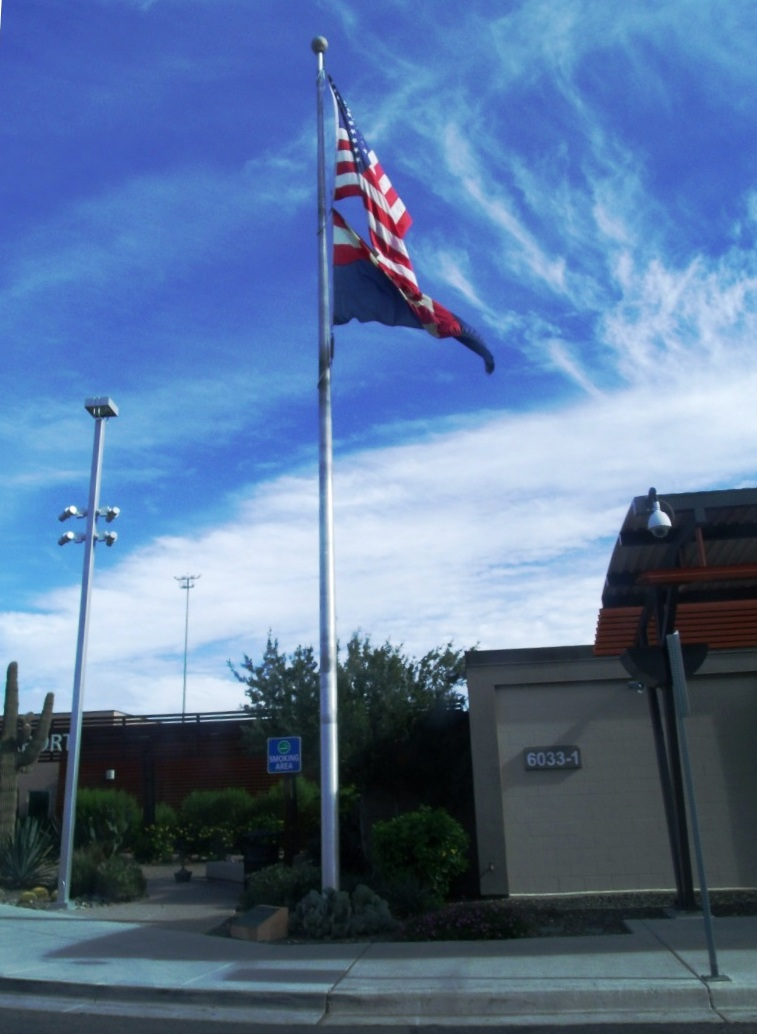
The Base Flagpole, built in December 1941, is significant for its symbolic and traditional association with the origins and history of Williams Air Force Base (now Mesa Gateway Airport). The pole was erected by the Del E. Webb Construction Company. Listed in the National Register of Historic Places – 1995 Reference 95000744.

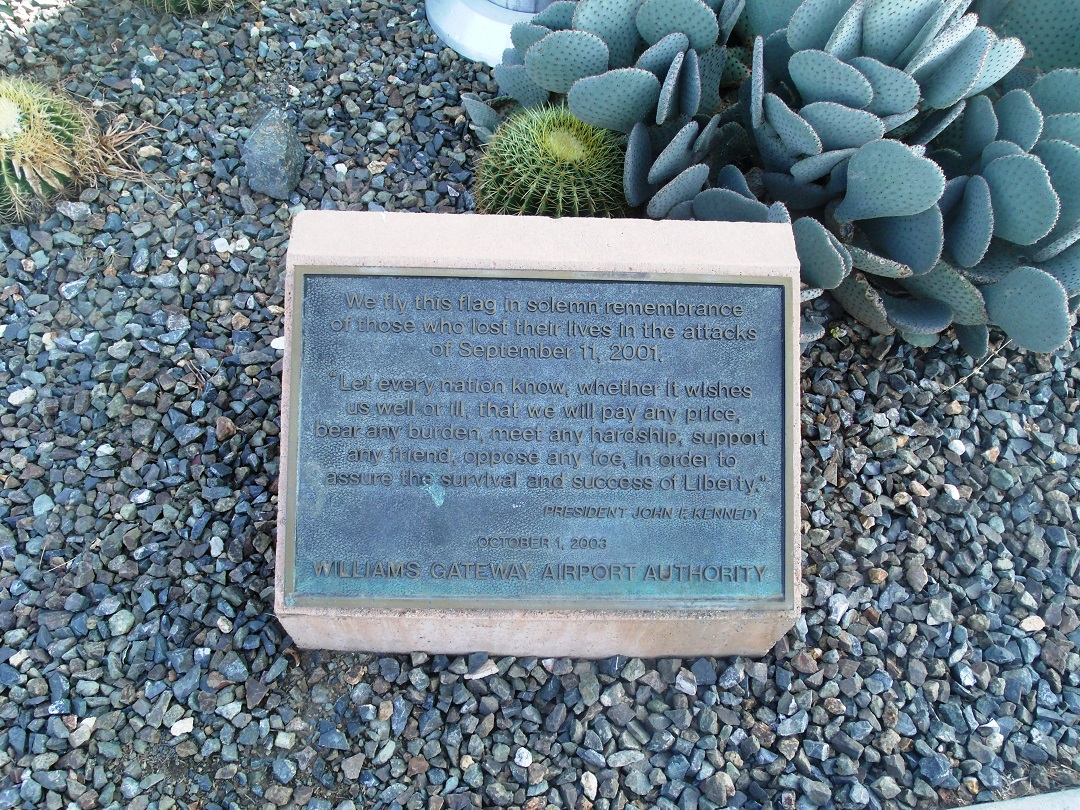
Marker of the historic flagpole

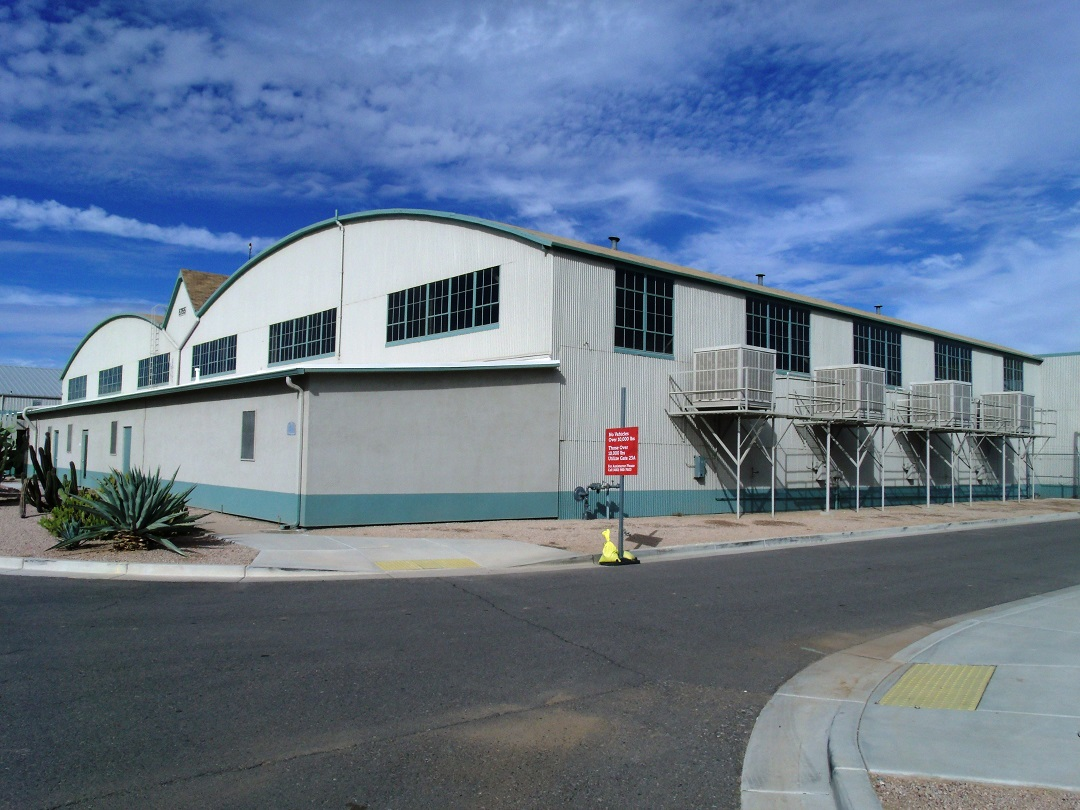
Demountable Hangar, located at the North Apron, Mesa Gateway Airport (formerly Williams AFB). Built in 1942 and designed by the Del E. Webb Construction Company to resemble an enlisted aviator badge of the Army Air Force. Listed on the National Register of Historic Places in 1995, ref. #95000743.

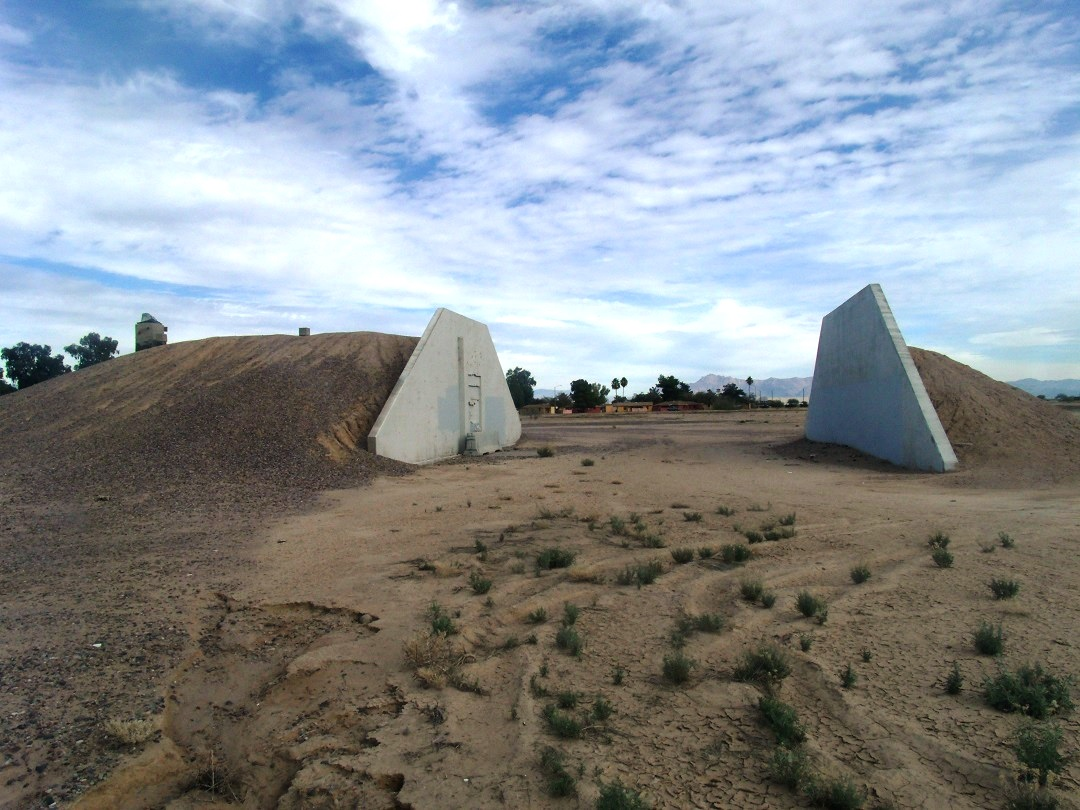
Ammo Bunker (S-1007), SW of Vosler Dr. (formerly Alaska Dr.), at Arizona State University at the Polytechnic campus (formerly Williams AFB). Built in 1942 by the Del E. Webb Construction Company. Listed in the National Register of Historic Places ref: 95000748.

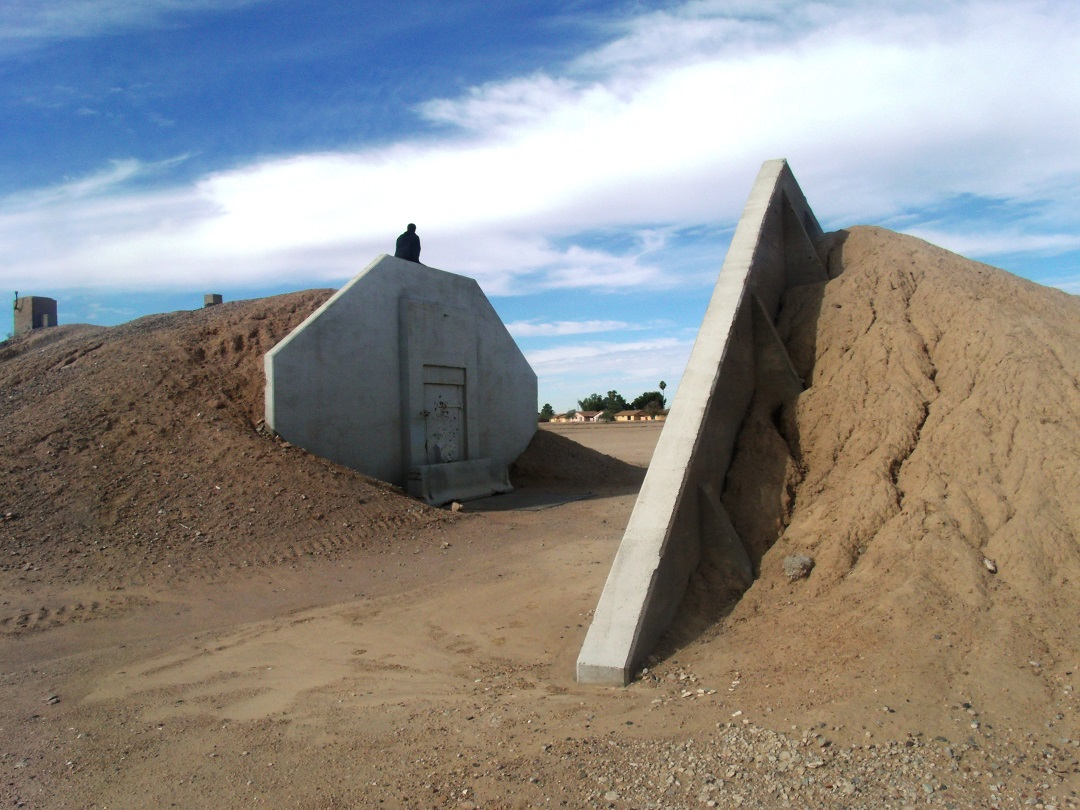
Ammo Bunker (S-1008), SW of Vosler Dr. (formerly Alaska Dr.), at Arizona State University at the Polytechnic campus (formerly Williams AFB). Built in 1942 by the Del E. Webb Construction Company. Listed in the National Register of Historic Places ref: 95000759.

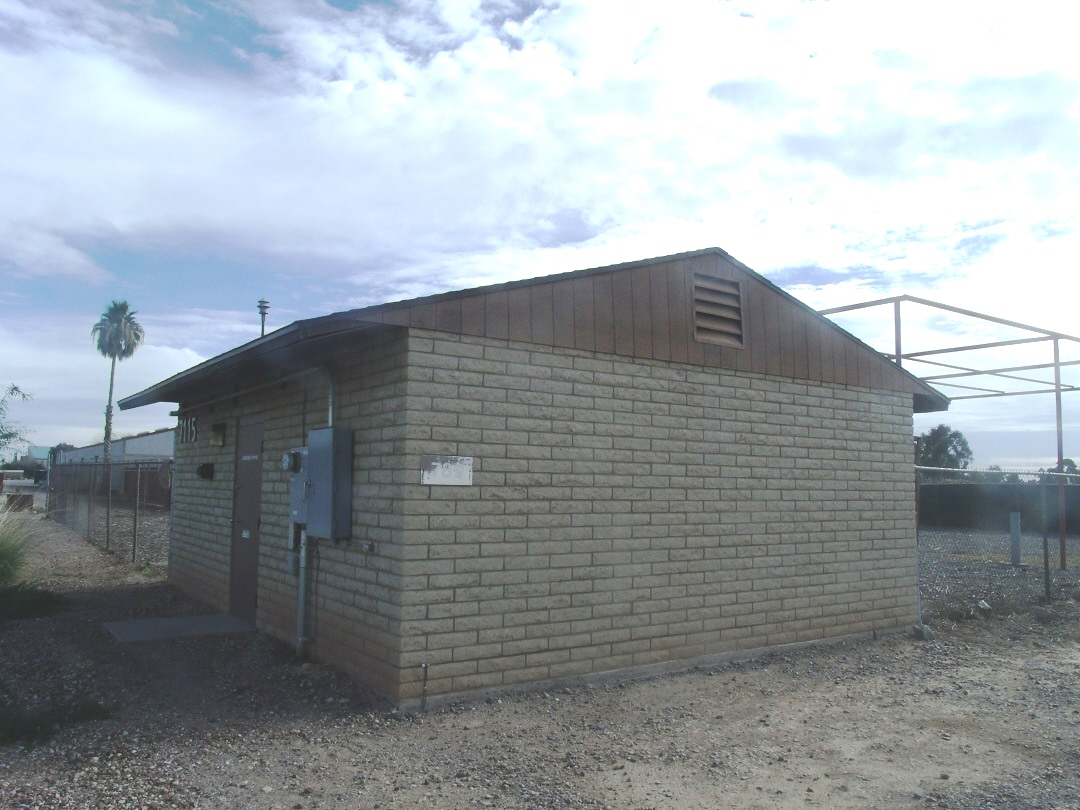
Civil Engineering Maintenance Shop, also known as S-735, located on Unity Ave. (Jct. of 11th and A Sts.), at Arizona State University at the Polytechnic campus (formerly Williams AFB). Listed in the National Register of Historic Places in 1995, ref: #95000747.

== See also ==
- Phoenix Sky Harbor International Airport
- Williams Air Force Base
- Arizona World War II Army Airfields
- List of airports in Arizona
