= Idaho Falls Regional Airport =

Airport serving Idaho Falls, Idaho

Idaho Falls Regional Airport Fanning Field
- IATA: IDA; ICAO: KIDA; FAA LID: IDA

Summary
- Airport type: Public
- Owner/Operator: City of Idaho Falls
- Serves: Idaho Falls, Idaho
- Location: 2140 N. Skyline Dr.
- Elevation AMSL: 4,744 ft (1,446 m)
- Coordinates: 43°30′49″N 112°04′15″W
- Website: Official website

Maps
- FAA airport diagram as of January 2021
- Location within Idaho Location within the United States

Runways
Direction	Length		Surface
Direction	ft	m	Surface
3/21	9,002	2,744	Asphalt
17/35	3,964	1,208	Asphalt

Statistics (2016)
- Aircraft operations: 33,152
- Based aircraft: 171
- Source: Federal Aviation Administration
- Idaho Falls Airport Historic District
- U.S. National Register of Historic Places
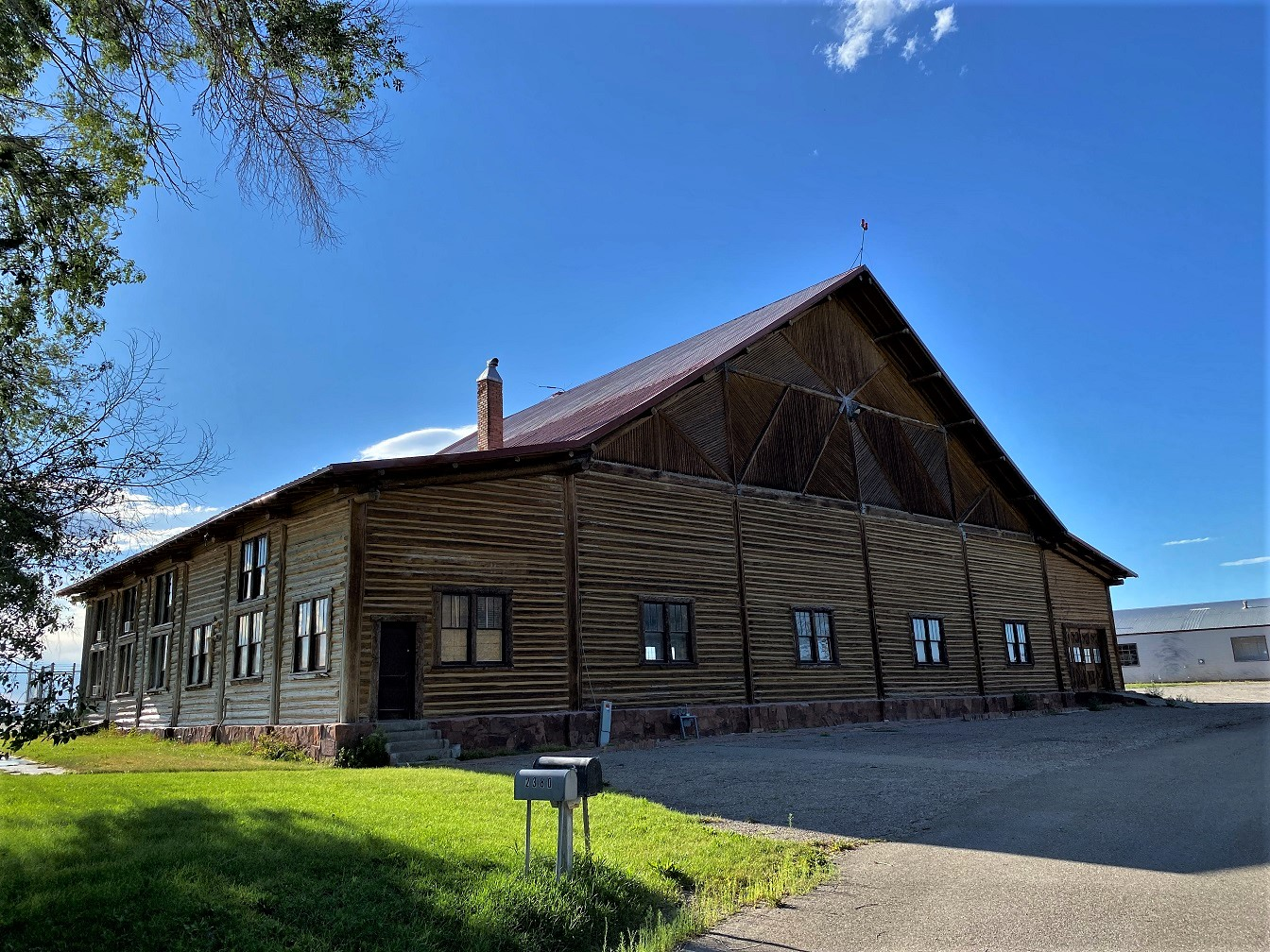
- The 1936 hangar in 2023
- Location: 2381 Foote Dr., Idaho Falls, Idaho
- Coordinates: 43°31′02″N 112°03′30″W
- Area: 4 acres (1.6 ha)
- Built: 1930
- Architect: C.R. Black
- Architectural style: Rustic
- NRHP reference No.: 97001126
- Added to NRHP: September 10, 1997

Idaho Falls Regional Airport (IATA: IDA, ICAO: KIDA, FAA LID: IDA) is 2 miles (3.2 km) north-northwest of downtown Idaho Falls, Idaho, United States. It is locally known as Fanning Field. It is the second-busiest airport in Idaho after Boise Airport.

The National Plan of Integrated Airport Systems for 2011–2015 categorized it as a primary commercial service facility. Federal Aviation Administration records say the airport had 148,584 passenger boardings (enplanements) in calendar year 2008, 138,957 in 2009 and 144,365 in 2010. In 2024, 610,641 passengers boarded flights at IDA, which was an 11.9% increase from 2023. This was also a 73.2% increase from 2019.

== Facilities ==
Idaho Falls Regional Airport covers 866 acres (350 ha) at an elevation of 4,744 feet (1,446 m). It has two asphalt runways: 3/21 is 9,002 by 150 feet (2,744 x 46 m) and 17/35 is 3,964 by 75 feet (1,208 x 23 m).

In the year ending December 31, 2016, the airport had 33,152 aircraft operations, average 91 per day: 65% general aviation, 31% air taxi, 3% airline and <1% military. 171 aircraft were then based at this airport: 128 single-engine, 29 multi-engine, 6 jet, 5 helicopter, and 3 glider.

== History ==
A historic portion on the east side of the airport was listed on the National Register of Historic Places in 1997. The listing included two contributing buildings and a contributing structure on 4 acres (1.6 ha): an aircraft hangar, an administrator or caretaker's cabin, and a beacon tower, as well as a surrounding landscaped area. It "represents" the original site of operations for the Idaho Falls Airport. The hangar was still in use in 1996.

== Terminal ==
The airport terminal has seen many expansions and a partial re-build throughout the years. The current terminal was built in 1959. The first expansion happening in 1982, which consisted of the old boarding area being torn down and retrofitted with jetways to accommodate smaller commercial aircraft that started coming in the mid-2000s. The previous terminal was designed with jetways for older generation Boeing 737, which stopped arriving in Idaho Falls after Delta Air Lines pulled out of mainline service to the airport in 1998. In 2014, an expansion project was completed that moved TSA screening of baggage out of view of passengers and allowed airlines to again check baggage from ticket counters. In 2019, the airport saw a need for a bigger baggage claim area. The existing carousel was replaced by two new baggage carousels. In addition a new rental car parking lot was constructed. A remodeling project began in 2020 that was to upgrade the amenities at the airport, that consisted of the addition of four new gates, relocated TSA screening and a new check-in area.

== Food and beverage service ==
As of December 1, 2018, Tailwind, a new food, beverage and sundries provider was selected through an open RFP initiated earlier that year. The company is assuming operations in limited mode as proposed renovations take place. The airport expressed a desire to have a vendor that would commit to minimum annual revenue (including a percentage of profits that goes to the airport), specific hours of operation based on flight schedules and out-of-pocket renovations to concession areas.

From 2001 to 2018, the airport restaurant and lounge operator used her own name, Kathryn's. The lounge was operated by this local owner starting in 1999. The restaurant operated limited hours and served basic American fare for breakfasts and lunches Monday through Saturday. At other times, souvenirs, sundries and basic food were available at Kathryn's Snack Shack pre-security screening. In later years of operation, after an airport renovation, Kathryn's Snack Shack also operated post-security on the second level of the airport with coffee, beverages and basic sundries.

The airport has struggled to maintain a viable restaurant operator in the past. One restaurant was known as "Dolores' Place" operated by local restaurant critic Dolores Casella. There were also "Das Kinder Haus" which served German food, and "Runway 21" (1991-1995) which tried to be an upscale steak house and coffee shop. The restaurant has been remodeled once in 1991 and a small fire broke out in 2008 while the restaurant was closed.

== Airlines and destinations ==
Airlines	Destinations	Refs
Alaska Airlines	Portland (OR), Seattle/Tacoma	
Allegiant Air	Las Vegas, Orange County, Phoenix/Mesa; Seasonal: Portland (OR)	
American Eagle	Dallas/Fort Worth; Seasonal: Chicago–O'Hare, Phoenix–Sky Harbor	
Delta Air Lines	Salt Lake City	
Delta Connection	Salt Lake City	
United Express	Chicago–O'Hare, Denver	

Destinations map
Destinations from Idaho Falls Regional Airport
Red = Year-round destination
Green = Seasonal destination
Blue = Future destination

== Statistics ==
Top destinations (September 2024 – August 2025)
Rank	Airport	Passengers	Carriers
1	Denver, Colorado	91,260	United
2	Salt Lake City, Utah	83,570	Delta
3	(Washington (state)) Seattle/Tacoma, Washington	45,450	Alaska
4	Phoenix-Mesa, Arizona	34,230	Allegiant
5	Dallas/Fort Worth, Texas	31,910	American
6	Santa Ana, California	14,970	Allegiant
7	Las Vegas, Nevada	13,780	Allegiant
8	Phoenix-Sky Harbor, Arizona	9,450	American
9	Portland, Oregon	8,870	Allegiant
10	Oakland, California	3,380	Allegiant

Airline market share (September 2024 – August 2025)
Rank	Carrier	Passengers	Share
1	SkyWest Airlines	363,000	54.06%
2	Allegiant Air	154,000	22.94%
3	Horizon Air	89,800	13.37%
4	Delta Air Lines	64,600	9.62%

== Airline history ==
- The first airline flights to come to Idaho Falls were on National Parks Airways in 1934–35. Successor Western Air Express/Western Airlines served Idaho Falls until 1987 when Western was acquired by and merged into Delta Air Lines. Western Air Express flew the following aircraft into Idaho Falls: Boeing 247s, Douglas DC-3s, Convair 240s, Douglas DC-6Bs, and Lockheed L-188 Electras. All these planes were later discontinued and updated with the Boeing 727-200, Boeing 737-200 and Boeing 737-300 jets. In 1976 Western Boeing 737-200s flew direct to Idaho Falls from Calgary, Great Falls, Helena, Las Vegas, Los Angeles, San Diego and San Francisco. These flights were in addition to non-stop 737 flights from Butte, Pocatello, Salt Lake City and West Yellowstone.
- In 1981 Western started service on the 727-200s, which flew direct to Los Angeles (LAX) and San Francisco (SFO), both via a stop in Salt Lake City. Following the merger with Western, Delta continued to operate mainline jets into Idaho Falls, and in 1989 they had three daily nonstop 737-200 and 737-300s flights to Salt Lake City. In 1994 Delta had three daily 727-200 and 737-300 nonstops to Salt Lake City.
- West Coast Airlines Douglas DC-3s began service into Idaho Falls in 1951 with Fairchild F-27s. They flew until 1968, when West Coast merged with Bonanza Air Lines and Pacific Air Lines to form Air West which was renamed Hughes Airwest. Air West served Idaho Falls with Fairchild F-27s beginning in 1968, as well as did Hughes Airwest. Both airlines started this service in 1972. In the mid 1970s, Hughes Airwest updated all flights to Idaho Falls to Douglas DC-9-10 and McDonnell Douglas DC-9-30 jets, which flew direct to San Francisco (SFO) and Seattle (SEA) and non-stop to Boise and Salt Lake City. By 1979 Hughes Airwest had added a non-stop DC-9-30s to Denver.
- By 1979, four airlines were serving Idaho Falls: Hughes Airwest, Western Air Express both flew jets while Gem State Airlines flew Convair 580s and Fairchild Swearingen Metroliners, and Mountain West Airlines-Idaho flew Embraer EMB-110 Bandeirantes and Piper Navajos.
- Cascade Airways served Idaho Falls 1980 to 1985, first with Embraer EMB-110 Bandeirantes and later with Fairchild Swearingen Metroliners and Hawker Siddeley HS 748s. In 1985 Cascade flew BAC One-Elevens direct to Boise, Portland and Seattle via Pocatello.
- Frontier Airlines started service June 12, 2014, between Idaho Falls and Denver but pulled out effective January 5, 2015.
- Horizon Air was serving Idaho Falls in 1985 with Fairchild Swearingen Metroliners non-stop to Boise and had de Havilland Canada DHC-8 Dash 8s by 1989. In 1995 Horizon Air was serving Idaho Falls with Dash 8s and Fokker F28 Fellowships for Alaska Airlines via a code sharing agreement with the non-stop flight F28 jet flight to Boise continuing to Oakland. The regional airline began operating non-stop between Idaho Falls and Seattle for Alaska Airlines in 2003 with the 76-seat Bombardier Q400 but ended the service in 2004. It reinstated non-stop flights to Seattle beginning on October 25, 2008. The flights included a stopover in Bozeman, Montana. This service was discontinued as of August 23, 2009. On June 16, 2010, Horizon Air announced its intention to once again discontinue all service to Idaho Falls effective August 22, 2010. At the time, the airline was flying between Idaho Falls and Boise.
- United Express operated by SkyWest Airlines via a code sharing agreement with United Airlines added nonstop Canadair CRJ-200s to Denver June 8, 2006.
- Allegiant Air added twice weekly McDonnell Douglas MD-80s to Las Vegas (LAS) in November 2005.
- Northwest Airlines started service between Idaho Falls and Minneapolis-St. Paul June 9, 2005. Service ended after Northwest merged with Delta Air Lines. Seasonal Delta flights with first-class and coach cabins resumed in June 2014.
- SeaPort Airlines offered service between Boise and Idaho Falls starting in July 2011 after Horizon Air left. Due to maintenance issues and due to aircraft changes, the airline stopped service on December 31, 2011. The flight time increased from 1 hour to 1.5 hours.
- Big Sky Airlines started service between Idaho Falls and Denver in October 2002; it ended January 13, 2003.
- Delta Air Lines ended mainline jets to Salt Lake City in October 1998. In 1995 Delta had three daily nonstop Boeing 737-300s to Salt Lake City while Delta Connection operated by SkyWest Airlines via a code sharing agreement had four daily Embraer EMB-120 Brasilias nonstop to Salt Lake City. During the 2022 runway reconstruction at the Jackson Hole Airport, Delta resumed mainline service using Airbus A220s. Delta service to Idaho Falls is now on SkyWest operating as the Delta Connection with Embraer 175s offering first-class and coach cabins.
- American Airlines discontinued mainline McDonnell Douglas MD-80s to Dallas/Fort Worth (DFW) in 1994. The service had started in December 1987. In 1989 American MD-80s flew to Idaho Falls from both Dallas/Fort Worth and Chicago O'Hare Airport, both via Salt Lake City.
- After its merger with Hughes Airwest in 1980, Republic Airlines (1979-1986) served Idaho Falls until September 1982. This service dated back to the West Coast Airlines era (see above). In the early 1980s, Republic McDonnell Douglas DC-9-30s flew non-stop to Boise and Denver and direct to Seattle. After Republic left, two carriers expressed interest to airport manager Jim Thorsen. Horizon Air then started serving Idaho Falls in 1983 with Fairchild Swearingen Metroliners.

== See also ==
- List of airports in Idaho
