= Provo Municipal Airport =

Provo Airport

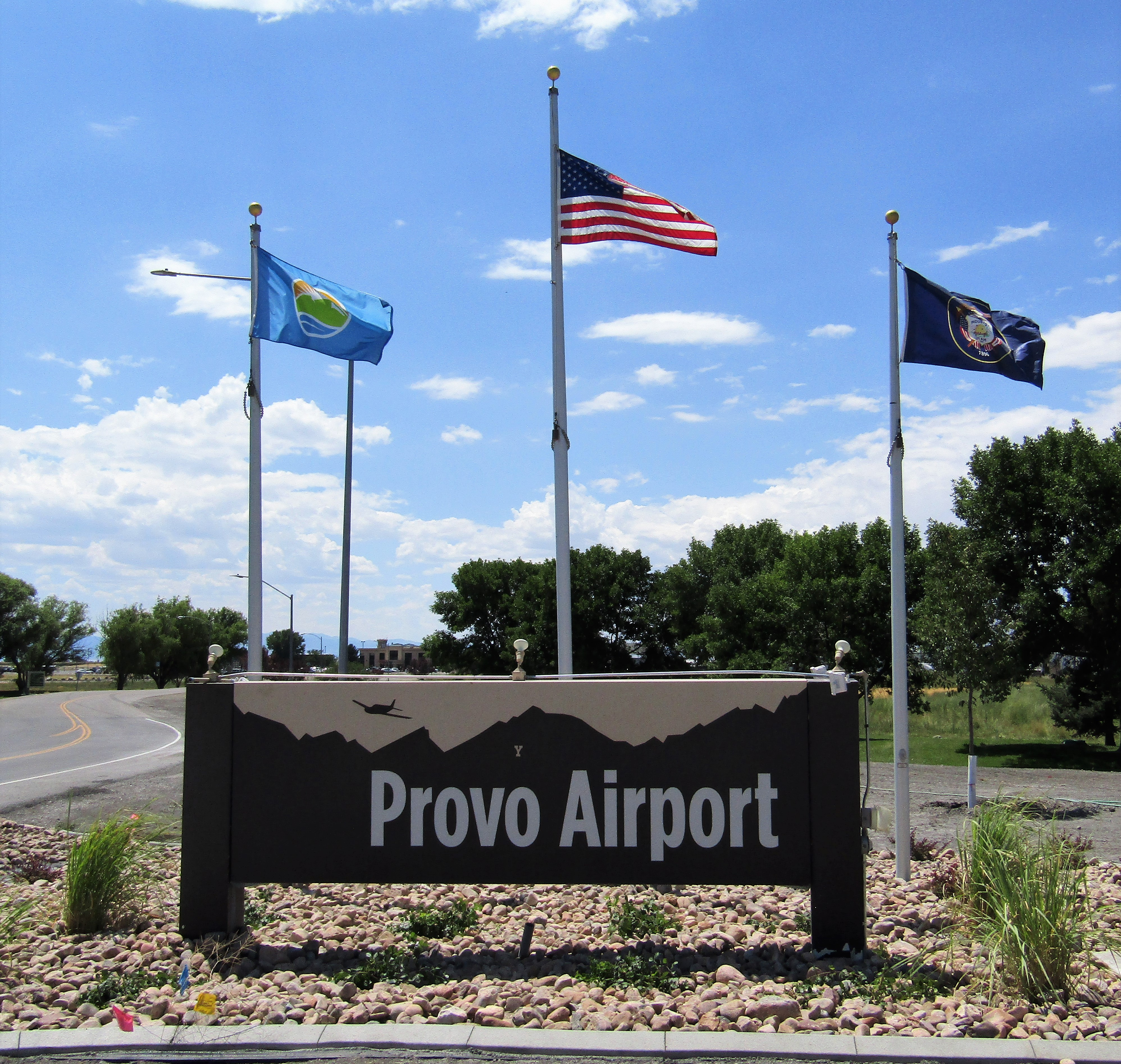
- IATA: PVU; ICAO: KPVU; FAA LID: PVU

Summary
- Airport type: Public
- Owner: City of Provo
- Serves: Salt Lake City metropolitan area
- Location: Provo, Utah; United States
- Operating base for: Allegiant Air; Breeze Airways
- Time zone: Mountain Time Zone (UTC-07:00 MST UTC-06:00 MDT)
- Elevation AMSL: 4,497 ft (1,371 m)
- Coordinates: 40°13′09.1″N 111°43′24.1″W
- Website: http://flyprovo.com

Maps
- FAA airport diagram as of January 2021
- Interactive map of Provo Airport

Runways
Direction	Length		Surface
Direction	ft	m	Surface
13/31	8,603	2,622	Asphalt
18/36	6,628	2,020	Asphalt

Statistics (2024)
- Total passengers: 889,000
- Aircraft operations: 184,395
- DOT

Provo Airport (IATA: PVU, ICAO: KPVU, FAA LID: PVU), formerly Provo Municipal Airport, is a public-use airport on east shore of Utah Lake on the southwestern edge of Provo, in Utah County, Utah, United States on the eastern shore of Utah Lake. It is a small regional airport with domestic flights mainly to destinations in the western United States. The airport is owned and managed by the city of Provo. It is the second-busiest airport in Utah, after the Salt Lake City International Airport (about 40 miles (64 km) north).

== History ==
The airport's history dates back to September 1942, when an airstrip was built on the site during World War II in response to US military requests for airstrips at convenient locations across the United States. Private and commercial aircraft were using the site by 1943.

SkyWest Airlines regularly flew to Provo in 1974–1975.

The airport was uncontrolled until the opening of an Air Traffic Control Tower in 2005. The nearby airspace became Class D airspace over a radius of 4 nautical miles (7.4 km) around the airport and up to 7,000 feet (2,100 m) MSL (2500 feet AGL), with a circular cutout in the southern portion surrounding nearby Spanish Fork Municipal Airport Woodhouse Field, which is not Class D.

In June 2011, Frontier Airlines began daily flights from Provo to Denver International Airport. Frontier's flights to Denver ended in January 2013.

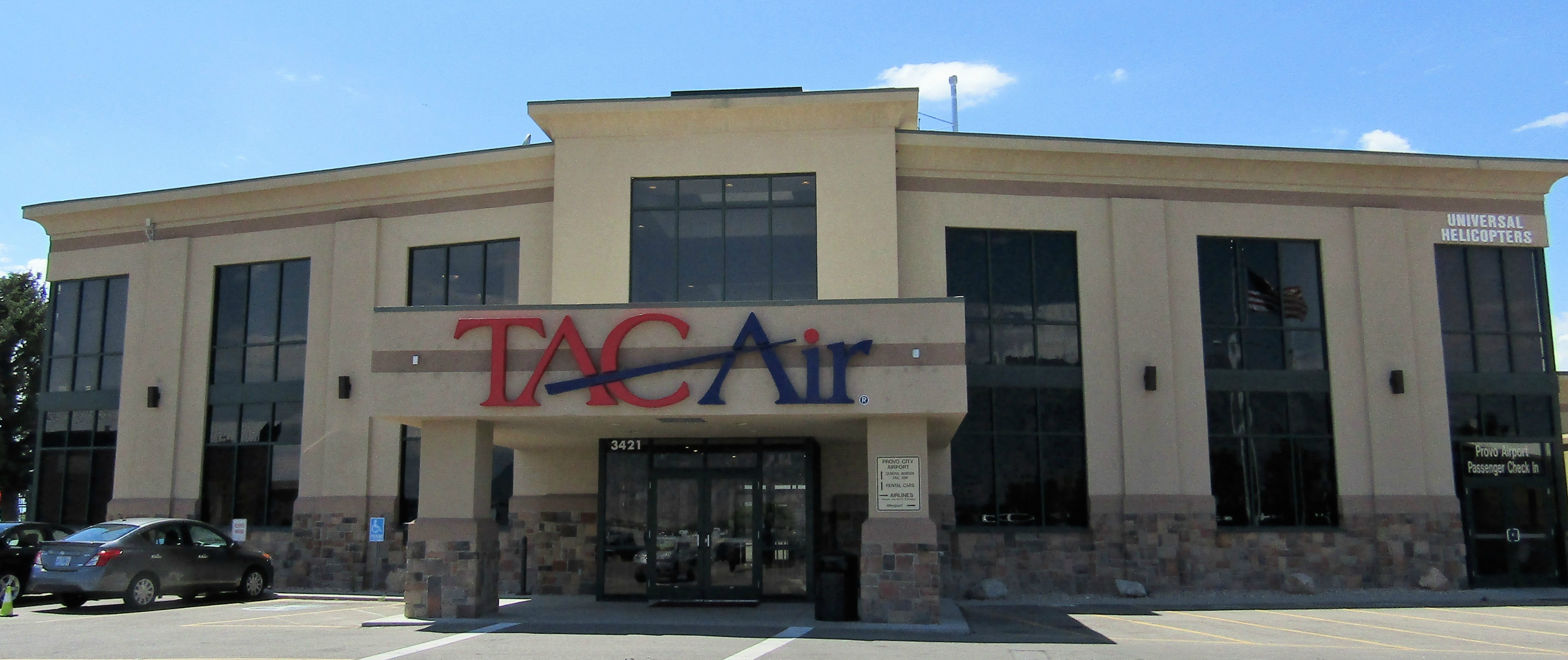
Former terminal building in July 2017

In anticipation of airline service, a new terminal area was built in early 2011 to house Transportation Security Administration equipment for passenger screening. As of August 2012, a millimeter-wave full-body scanner was in use.

In November 2019, the airport broke ground on a new $40 million terminal. The new terminal would have four gates initially, with future expansion to ten gates in total. The terminal was completed in May 2022, with a full shift to the new terminal and gates planned for a later date.

=== Airlines and flights ===
Allegiant Air began flights to Phoenix/Mesa Gateway Airport in February 2013; in March 2013, the airline announced twice-weekly flights to Oakland International Airport beginning June 7. On July 4, 2013, it was announced Allegiant Air would begin flying to Los Angeles International Airport beginning September 26, 2013. In June 2016, Allegiant Air announced it would begin flying to San Diego International Airport beginning September 28, 2016. Service to Oakland and San Diego was suspended in 2018. Service to Tucson International Airport began on Nov 16, 2018. In August 2020, Allegiant Air announced it would begin flying to Denver International Airport beginning November 19, 2020. Also in 2020, Duncan Aviation, the US' largest general aviation maintenance MRO, finished a 328,000 sq/ft maintenance facility on the north end of the field. Later that year, it announced flights from Provo to Orange County, California would begin in February 2021. In May 2021, Allegiant Air announced that it would add service to St. Pete-Clearwater International Airport in Florida and Phoenix Sky Harbor International Airport as additional destinations from Provo, with flights beginning in October 2021.

Utah-based Breeze Airways added five routes from Provo in 2022, including three nonstop routes to San Francisco International Airport, Harry Reid International Airport in Las Vegas, and Los Angeles International Airport. Also in 2022, the Allegiant Travel Company announced plans to invest $95 million to expand their presence in Provo and establish a four-aircraft base at the Provo Airport. Additionally, Utah-based Breeze Airways announced they would create the airline's Utah operating base at the airport with four airplanes, and five new routes.

American Airlines, through regional brand American Eagle, began service to Dallas/Fort Worth and Phoenix Sky Harbor International Airport in October 2024, competing with Breeze's and Allegiant's existing flights.

== Facilities ==
The Provo Airport covers 869 acres (3.5 km^{2}) and has two runways:

- 13/31: 8,603 ft × 150 ft (2,622 m × 46 m), asphalt
- 18/36: 6,628 ft × 150 ft (2,020 m × 46 m), asphalt

== Airlines and destinations ==
Airlines	Destinations
Allegiant Air	Austin, Burbank, Houston–Hobby, Nashville, Orange County, Orlando/Sanford, Phoenix/Mesa, Portland (OR)
American Eagle	Dallas/Fort Worth, Phoenix–Sky Harbor
Breeze Airways	Burbank, Dallas/Fort Worth, Las Vegas, Orange County, Orlando, Phoenix–Sky Harbor, Raleigh/Durham, San Bernardino, San Francisco, Washington–Dulles

== General aviation ==
General aviation (GA) also contributes to the overall operations of the Provo Airport. There are two fixed base operators (FBO), Duncan Aviation and Signature Flight Support, on the field. Utah Valley University operates a flight school, as well as its Fire & Rescue program. Numerous privately owned aircraft and hangars are also based on the Provo Airport property.

== Statistics ==
Busiest domestic routes from PVU (September 2025 – August 2026)
Rank	City	Passengers	Carriers
1	Santa Ana, California	172,910	Allegiant, Breeze
2	Phoenix/Mesa, Arizona	115,490	Allegiant
3	Dallas/Fort Worth, Texas	53,960	American, Breeze
4	Phoenix–Sky Harbor, Arizona	37,710	American, Breeze
5	Burbank, California	26,880	Allegiant
6	Houston–Hobby, Texas	20,170	Allegiant
7	Orlando, Florida	19,570	Breeze
8	Las Vegas, Nevada	17,460	Breeze
9	Austin, Texas	17,460	Allegiant
10	Washington–Dulles, Virginia	15,880	Breeze

=== Carrier shares ===
Carrier shares (September 2025 – August 2026)
Carrier	Passengers (arriving and departing)
Allegiant	522,000(47.41%)
Breeze	472,000(42.89%)
SkyWest	97,590(8.86%)
American	8,880(0.81%)

=== Annual traffic ===
Annual passenger traffic at PVU (Ending April 2024)
Year	Passengers	Year	Passengers	Year	Passengers
2016	151,000	2020	149,000	2024	845,000
2017	176,000	2021	229,000	2025	925,000
2018	155,000	2022	412,000	2026	
2019	214,000	2023	810,000	2027	

== Accidents and incidents ==
Since 1984, there have been a total of 22 accidents and incidents at or around the Provo Airport. Notable events are as follows:

- November 21, 1995: a Cessna 152 impacted terrain east of Provo five minutes after departing the Provo Airport. The sole pilot on board was fatally injured. Witnesses reported that the aircraft did not make any sudden movements to avoid the terrain or make any unusual engine noises. It was later found the pilot was terrified of serving jail time after being convicted in a pyramid scheme court case and that he was building a new identity after becoming estranged from his father. The NTSB ruled the probable cause of the accident was pilot suicide.
- July 16, 2001: a Diamond DA-20 collided with terrain following a loss of control during an aborted landing at the Provo Airport. The sole student pilot onboard was not injured. The probable cause was found to be an inadvertent stall induced by the pilot during the go-around attempt.
- April 17, 2003: a Cessna 310 crashed while inbound to Provo. The three people on board were declared dead at the scene. Wreckage signified the aircraft nosedived into the ground instead of skidding first.
- October 21, 2009: a Utah Valley University student was killed when the engine on his single-engine aircraft failed. The student was returning from Spanish Fork Municipal Airport Woodhouse Field when the accident occurred. The aircraft came to rest 500 feet short of the runway.
- March 28, 2013: a Diamond DA-20 crashed after its wing impacted the ground on a hard landing attempt. The student pilot onboard escaped uninjured.
- August 16, 2019: a light sport aircraft's front nose gear collapsed on landing at Provo. Nobody onboard was injured, and no runway damage was reported.
- January 31, 2022: a Piper PA-44 Seminole operated by the Utah Valley University School of Aviation Sciences suffered a landing gear collapse while performing a touch-and-go. The plane reportedly touched down safely, but the gear collapsed before the aircraft was able to lift off again. Neither person onboard was injured.
- January 2, 2023: an Embraer Phenom 300 crashed shortly after takeoff. As of January 3, 2023, the cause of the accident is under investigation. The pilot was fatally injured, and one passenger was critically injured. The other two passengers received minor injuries. The airport was closed until January 4, 2023, due to the investigation.
- November 24, 2025: a Piper M700 Fury returned to Provo shortly after takeoff due to a fire. The cause of the incident is currently under investigation. There were four individuals on board, one of which required medical attention and was transported to a nearby hospital. The airport reopened later the same day .

== See also ==
- List of airports in Utah
