= Glacier Park International Airport =

Airport in Montana, United States

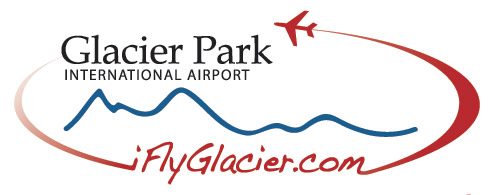

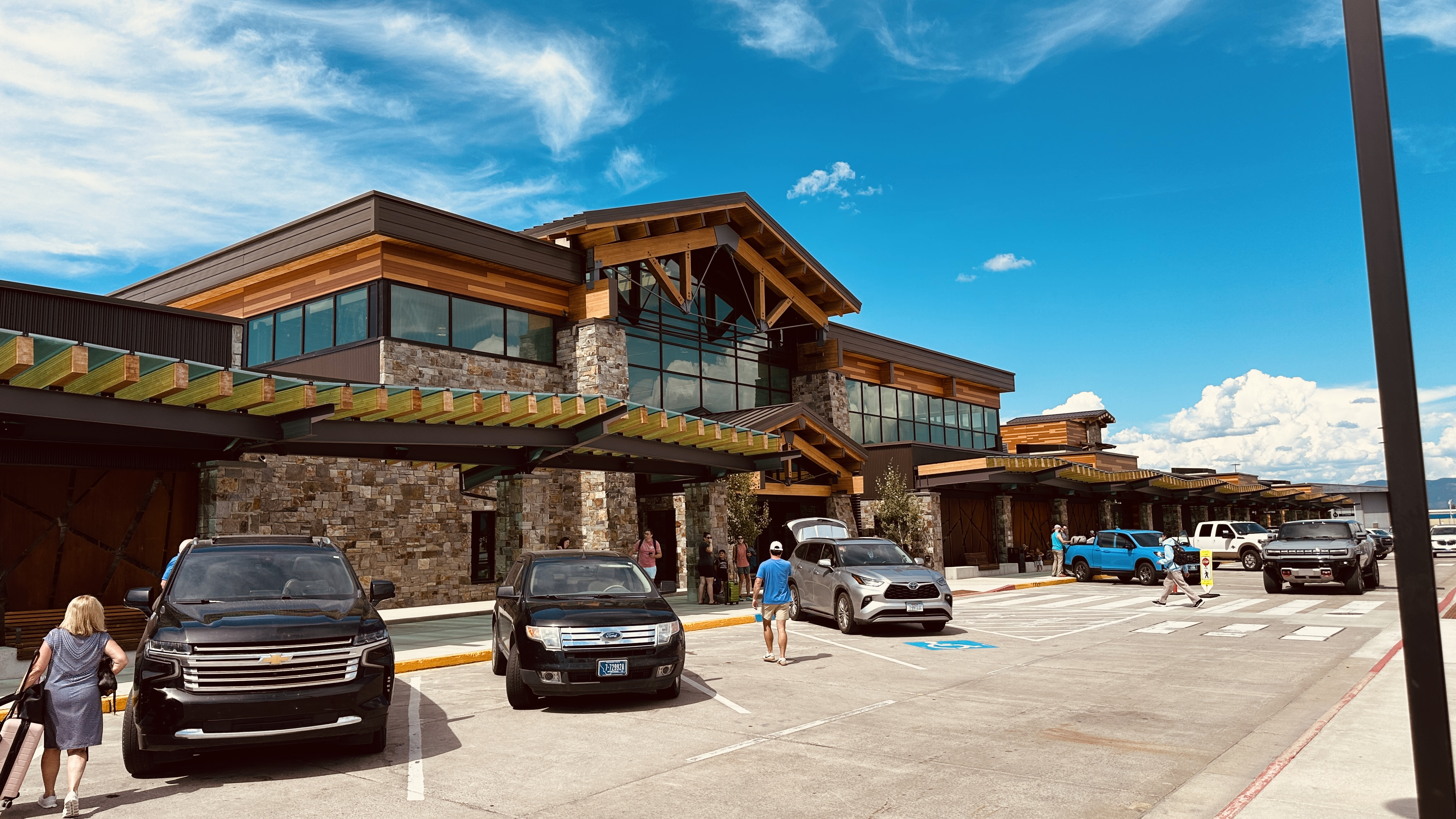
- IATA: FCA; ICAO: KGPI; FAA LID: GPI

Summary
- Airport type: Public
- Owner: Flathead Municipal Airport Authority
- Serves: Kalispell, Montana
- Elevation AMSL: 2,976 ft (907 m)
- Coordinates: 48°18′38″N 114°15′22″W
- Website: www.IFlyGlacier.com

Maps
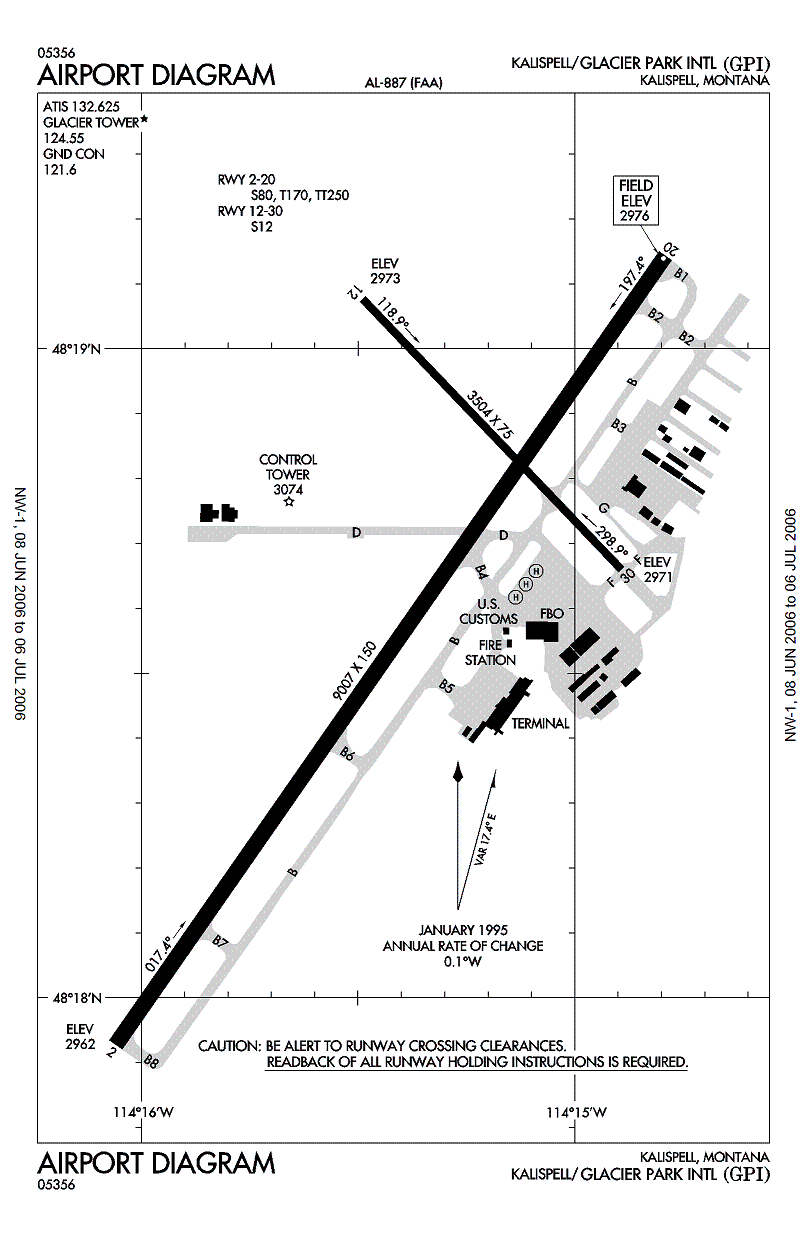
- FAA airport diagram
- Interactive map of Glacier Park International Airport

Runways
| Direction | Length | | Surface |
| Direction | ft | m | Surface |
|---|---|---|---|
| 2/20 | 9,007 | 2,745 | Asphalt |
| 12/30 | 3,510 | 1,070 | Asphalt |

Statistics (2025)
- Enplanements: 560,307
- Deplanements: 554,184
- Passengers: 1,114,491
- Source: Federal Aviation Administration

Glacier Park International Airport (IATA: FCA, ICAO: KGPI, FAA LID: GPI) is an airport in Flathead County, Montana, United States, six miles northeast of Kalispell. The airport is owned and operated by the Flathead Municipal Airport Authority, a public agency created by the county in 1974. The airport is near Glacier National Park.

The airport's ICAO code was KFCA, and most airlines still use that code for reservations purposes. Most U.S. airports use the same three-letter location identifier for the FAA and IATA, but Glacier Park International Airport is GPI to the FAA and FCA to the IATA (which assigned GPI to Guapi Airport in Colombia).

== History ==
The airport was built in 1942 as Flathead County Airport, from which its IATA and original FAA and ICAO codes were derived. Airline flights operated by Northwest Airlines began in 1950; however, passenger traffic was sparse for years. In 1970 the airport was designated as an international airport and received its current name. In the 1970s and 1980s passenger traffic increased as Hughes Airwest (previously Air West), Western Airlines, Delta Air Lines (which acquired Western), the original Frontier Airlines (1950–1986) and Horizon Air offered new jet service. Jetliners operated into the airport in the past include the Boeing 727-200, Boeing 737-200, Boeing 757-200, McDonnell Douglas DC-9-30 and Fokker F28. The 757 operated by Delta is the largest aircraft ever to have provided scheduled passenger service at the airport.

The terminal was upgraded in 1981, and further upgrades to the terminal, runways and other facilities occurred in the 1990s. Between 1974 and 1998, passenger traffic increased more than fivefold.

In 2018, planning efforts began to expand and modernize the terminal building in its existing location. After a delay due to the COVID-19 pandemic, construction began in spring of 2021. "Phase 1A" of the project (new hold rooms, security checkpoint, basement, and administration offices) opened in March 2024, Phase "1B" (renovated ticketing lobby, central atrium, and renovated baggage claim) opened in May 2025, and "Phase 2" (three additional hold rooms and a third bag claim device) is scheduled to open in spring of 2026. When complete, the terminal building will be approximately 200,000 square feet (up from 75,000 before the project). Total project costs are estimated to finish at approximately $165,000,000.

Service to Phoenix, Arizona, on US Airways (formerly America West Airlines before it merged with US Airways) ended in 2007. West Coast Airlines served the airport in the 1960s with Fairchild F-27 turboprops flying to Spokane, Seattle and Great Falls before this carrier merged with Bonanza Airlines and Pacific Air Lines to form Air West, which continued F-27 service from Kalispell. Air West was then renamed Hughes Airwest which in turn introduced McDonnell Douglas DC-9-30 jet service. The original Frontier Airlines operated Boeing 737-200s during the 1970s with a routing of Kalispell–Missoula–Bozeman–Salt Lake City–Denver–St. Louis. By the 1980s, Frontier was continuing to operate Boeing 737-200s with Kalispell–Billings–Denver flights. Cascade Airways operated Fairchild Swearingen Metroliners (Metro III model) into FCA until it folded in 1986. In the 1990s, Horizon Air, a subsidiary of Alaska Airlines, flew Fokker F28 jets to Spokane and Seattle in addition to operating propjet service with de Havilland Canada DHC-8 Dash 8s, Dornier 328s and Fairchild Swearingen Metroliners. Current Alaska Airlines service into the airport is operated by Horizon Air with the Embraer 175 regional jet.

== Facilities ==
The airport covers 1,525 acres (617 ha) and has two asphalt runways: 2/20 is 9,007 x 150 ft (2,745 x 46 m) and 12/30 is 3,510 x 75 ft (1,070 x 23 m). The airport holds a multitude of private aviation hangars, one commercial terminal, and an FBO to support the general aviation traffic.

Delta operates mainline narrow-body jets and Delta Connection operates regional jets using CRJ and Embraer aircraft. Daily nonstop flights to Minneapolis/St. Paul and Salt Lake City are operated year-round by both Delta and its regional affiliate.

United Express operates daily nonstop jet service to Denver year-round on CRJ aircraft. During summer, it operates seasonal nonstop jet service to Chicago (six times a week) and San Francisco (daily).

== Airlines and destinations ==
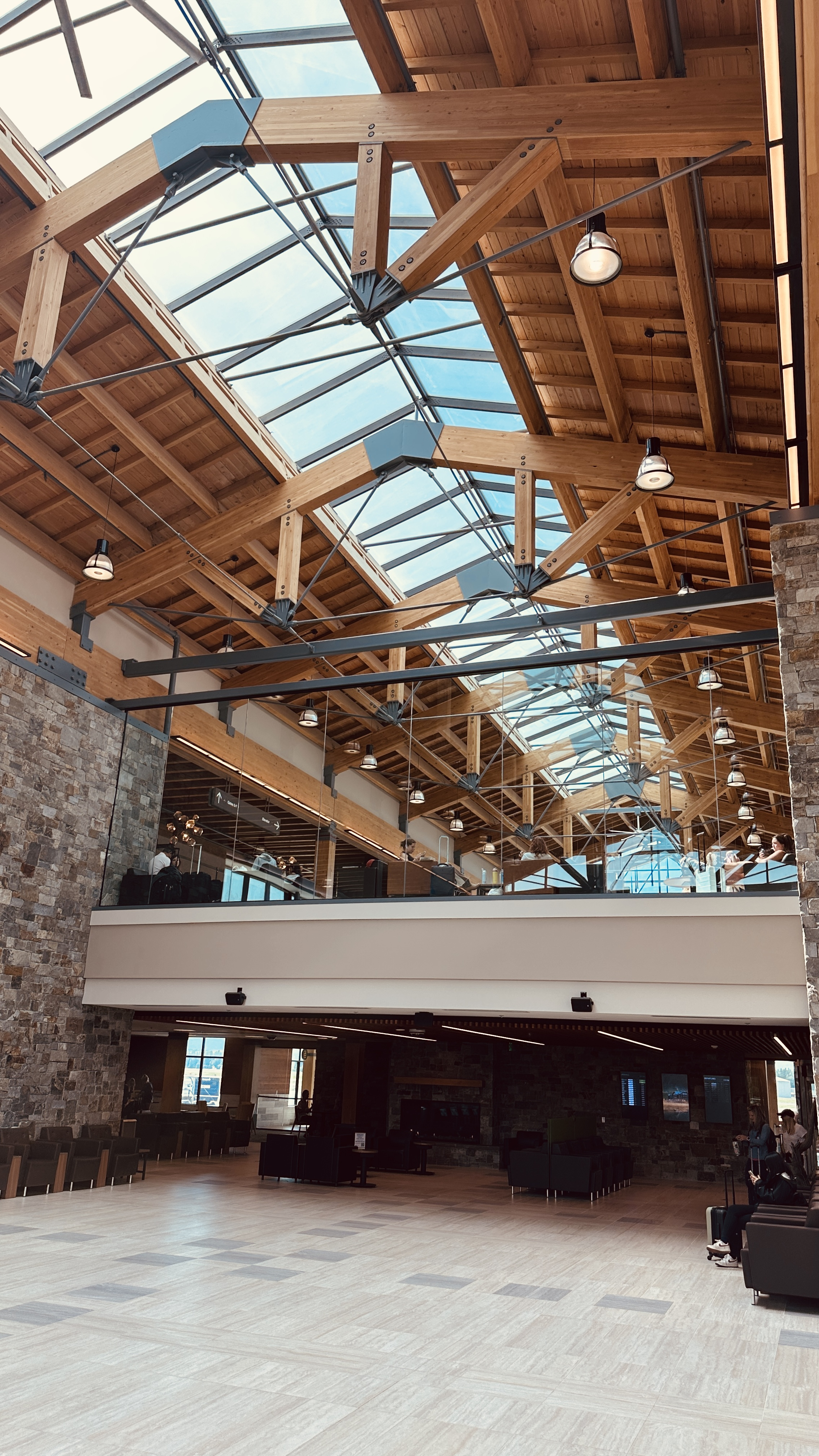
Main atrium looking west.

| Airlines | Destinations |
|---|---|
| Alaska Airlines | Portland (OR), Seattle/Tacoma; Seasonal: San Diego |
| Allegiant Air | Las Vegas; Seasonal: Phoenix/Mesa |
| American Airlines | Seasonal: Chicago–O'Hare, Dallas/Fort Worth, New York–LaGuardia |
| American Eagle | Seasonal: Phoenix–Sky Harbor |
| Delta Air Lines | Minneapolis/St. Paul, Salt Lake City |
| Delta Connection | Salt Lake City; Seasonal: Austin |
| United Airlines | Denver; Seasonal: Chicago–O'Hare, Houston–Intercontinental, Newark |
| United Express | Denver; Seasonal: Chicago–O'Hare, Los Angeles, San Francisco |

Destinations map
Destinations from Glacier Park International Airport
Red = Year-round destination
Green = Seasonal destination
Blue = Future destination

== Statistics ==
Top ten busiest domestic routes out of FCA (August 2025 – July 2026)
| Rank | City | Passengers | Carriers |
|---|---|---|---|
| 1 | Denver, Colorado | 129,100 | United |
| 2 | Salt Lake City, Utah | 88,930 | Delta |
| 3 | Seattle/Tacoma, Washington | 67,400 | Alaska |
| 4 | Minneapolis/St Paul, Minnesota | 66,650 | Delta, Sun Country |
| 5 | Chicago O’Hare, Illinois | 62,200 | American, United |
| 6 | Dallas/Fort Worth, Texas | 36,020 | American |
| 7 | Portland, Oregon | 22,350 | Alaska |
| 8 | San Francisco, California | 14,930 | United |
| 9 | Phoenix/Mesa, Arizona | 14,350 | Allegiant |
| 10 | Las Vegas, Nevada | 13,930 | Allegiant |

=== Airline market share ===
Largest airlines at FCA (August 2025 – July 2026)
| Rank | Airline | Passengers | Share |
|---|---|---|---|
| 1 | United Airlines | 286,000 | 27.00% |
| 2 | Delta Air Lines | 204,000 | 19.27% |
| 3 | SkyWest Airlines | 188,000 | 17.76% |
| 4 | Horizon Air | 171,000 | 16.15% |
| 5 | American Airlines | 128,000 | 12.03% |
| — | Other | 82,690 | 7.79% |

== See also ==
- List of airports in Montana
