= Spanish Fork Municipal Airport Woodhouse Field =

Airport in Utah, US

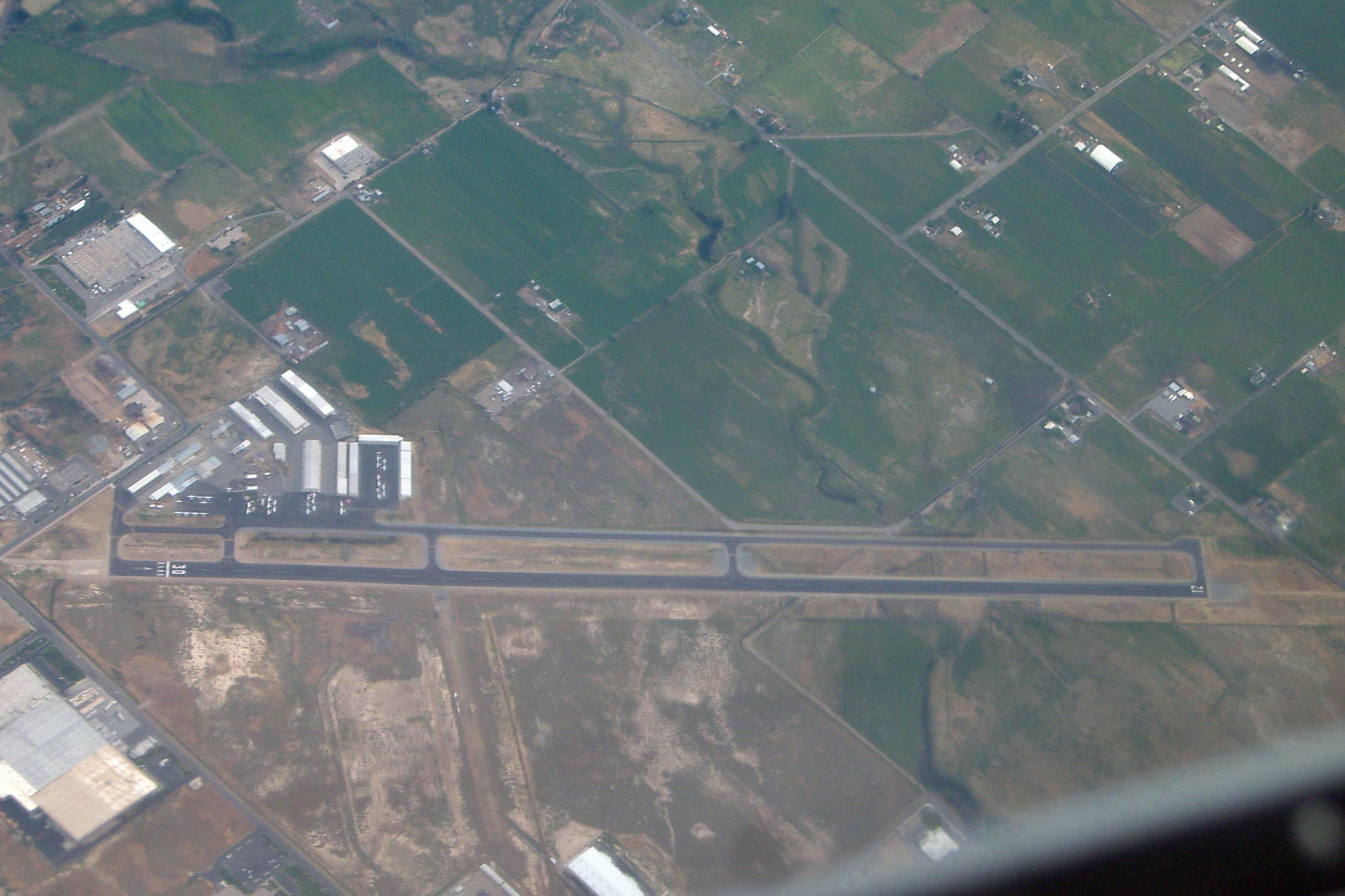
- Aerial view of the Spanish Fork Airport, August 2008
- IATA: none; ICAO: KSPK; FAA LID: SPK

Summary
- Airport type: Public
- Owner: City of Spanish Fork
- Serves: Spanish Fork and southern Utah County
- Location: Spanish Fork, Utah; United States
- Time zone: Mountain Time Zone (UTC-07:00 MST UTC-06:00 MDT)
- Elevation AMSL: 4,529 ft (1,380 m)
- Coordinates: 40°08′31″N 111°39′48″W
- Website: www.spanishfork.org/departments/airport/index.php

Map
- Location within Utah Location within the United States

Runways
Direction	Length		Surface
Direction	ft	m	Surface
12/30	6,500	1,983	Asphalt

Spanish Fork Municipal Airport Woodhouse Field (FAA LID:SPK), formerly known as the Spanish Fork-Springville Airport, is a general aviation airport located in north Spanish Fork, Utah, United States, that serves southern Utah County.

== Description ==
The airport is located approximately 5 miles (8.0 km) southeast of the nearby Provo Municipal Airport. The Spanish Fork airport is home to Wings and Wheels (formerly Aeroplanes, Trains, and Automobiles), an annual event celebrating anything that flies through the air or down the road.

== History ==
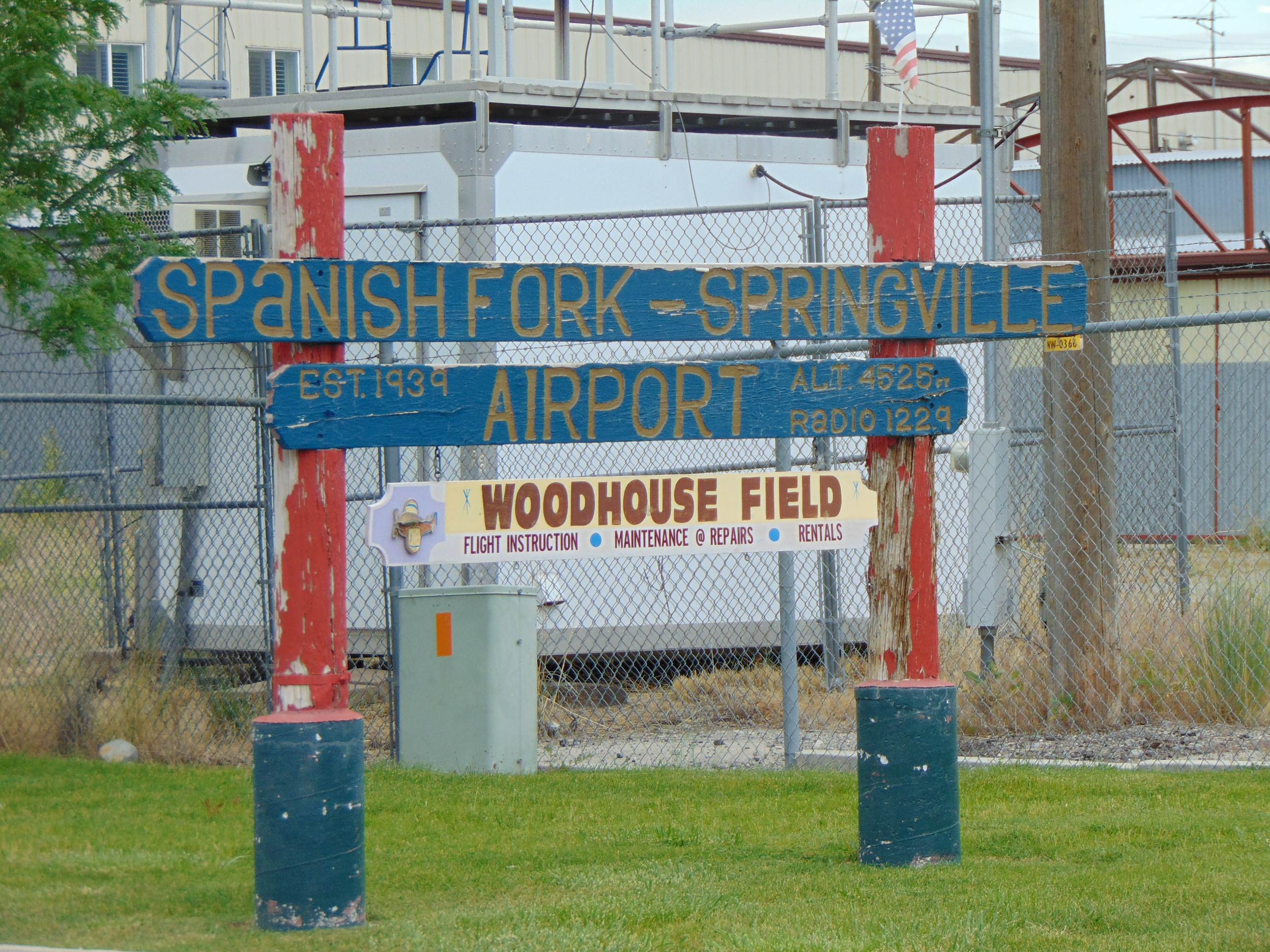
Former airport sign with former name, June 2016

The city of Spanish Fork participated in the Federal Works Progress Administration (WPA) program that offered to build airports for cities during the late 1920s and 1930s. Cities needed to provide the required acreage of fenced land with road access to be eligible. The (then) 160-acre airport was built and certified in the summer of 1931. Between 1935 and 1936 the adjacent city of Springville made a request to build an airport. The Utah Aeronautics Board (UAB) and Civil Aviation Board (CAB), predecessor to the Federal Aviation Administration (FAA), rejected Springville's proposal due to the close proximity to the Spanish Fork Airport. The UAB and CAB suggested that the two cities team-up to operate the airport. Springville paid Spanish Fork half of the airport operating costs and built the required access road to the airport. In 2019, Springville bowed out as a partner of the airport and Spanish Fork City once again has sole ownership. Spanish Fork officially renamed the airport as the "'Spanish Fork Municipal Airport Woodhouse Field".

The airport has continued to develop over the years and as of 2024 had 135 hangars, 79 tie downs, over 400 based aircraft, a fixed base operator (FBO), six flight schools, and an aircraft manufacturing company.

Spanish Fork Airport is also undergoing rapid expansion through the current design of a full-length parallel taxiway Bravo on the North side of Runway 12/30. This taxiway will be funded by the FAA and under construction by 2026. The parallel taxiway design and construction is spurred by two large scale hangar developments taking place on the North side of the runway. Patey Aviation is constructing over 120 hangars through several phases. The first phase, consisting of 66 hangars and an additional FBO, is slated for completion by fall of 2025. Utah Aviation is also constructing hangars on the North side of the runway with 27 hangars under construction and a second FBO building under construction as well. Utah Aviation currently has an FBO agreement with Spanish Fork Airport and is currently the only operating FBO. Their second FBO building will operate under the same business license and FBO agreement, but will primarily serve airport users on the North side of the airport.

A third smaller development is also currently taking place on the South side of the runway. General Aviation Development started the construction of 37 small hangars near the current airport entrance road with plans to complete these hangars by summer of 2025. At the end of the ongoing construction, Spanish Fork Airport will have a hangar inventory of over 330 hangars.

In conjunction with the airport footprint growth, Spanish Fork Airport has seen a tremendous increase in aircraft operations. In 2018 the recorded number of operations was 31,581 total operations. By 2023, operations had grown to 74,980 total operations. Airport staff expect to see over 115,000 operations by the end of the 2024 calendar year.

== See also ==
- List of airports in Utah
