= 3-deoxy-manno-octulosonic acid transferase =

3-deoxy-manno-octulosonic acid transferase may refer to:

- Lipid IVA 3-deoxy-D-manno-octulosonic acid transferase, an enzyme
- (KDO)-lipid IVA 3-deoxy-D-manno-octulosonic acid transferase, an enzyme
- (KDO)2-lipid IVA (2-8) 3-deoxy-D-manno-octulosonic acid transferase, an enzyme
- (KDO)3-lipid IVA (2-4) 3-deoxy-D-manno-octulosonic acid transferase, an enzyme
