= Canyonlands Regional Airport =

Regional airstrip near Moab, Utah, United States

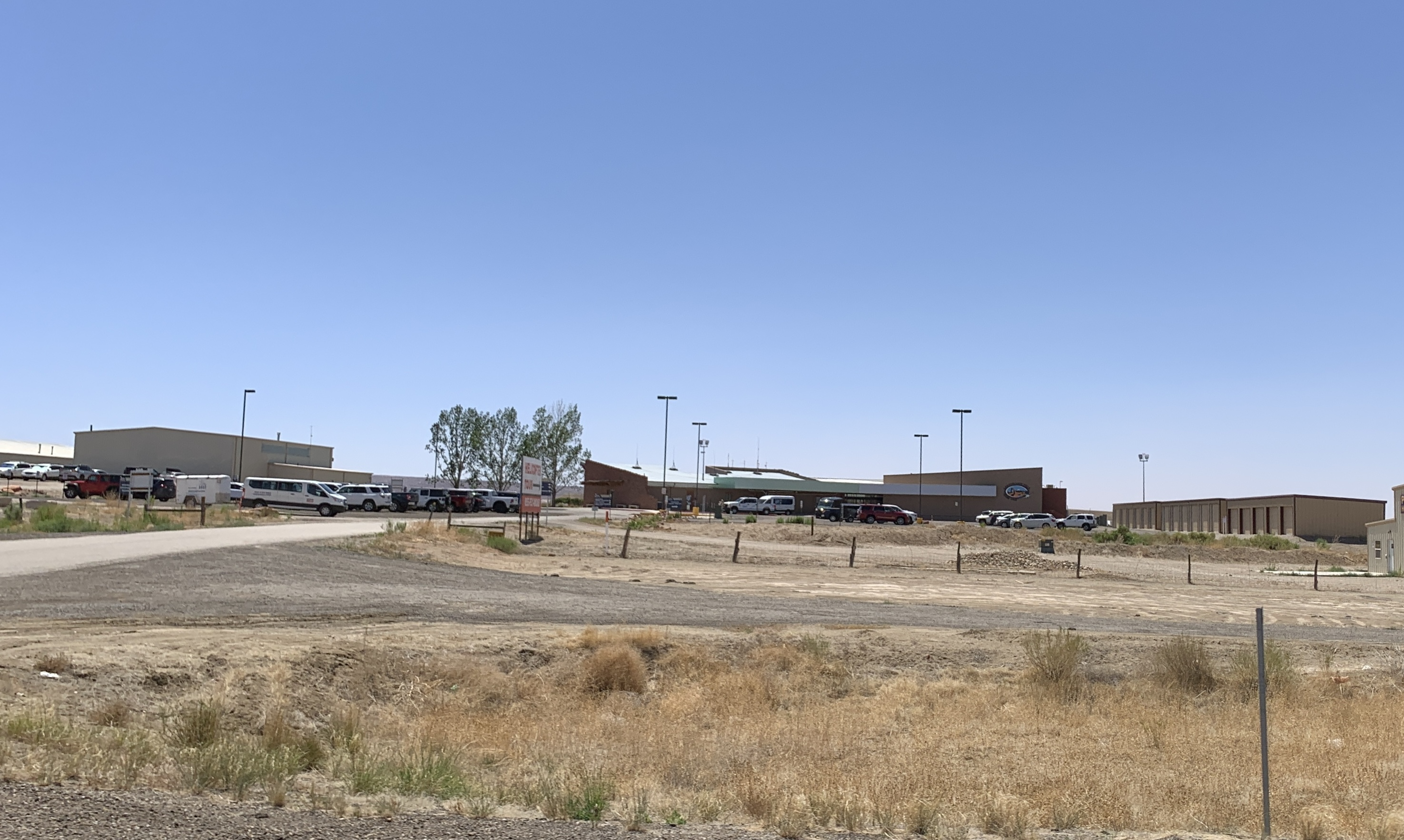
- IATA: CNY; ICAO: KCNY; FAA LID: CNY

Summary
- Airport type: Public
- Owner: Grand County
- Serves: Moab, Utah
- Elevation AMSL: 4,590 ft (1,400 m)
- Coordinates: 38°45′18″N 109°45′17″W
- Website: GrandCountyUtah.net/...

Map
- Location within Utah Location within the United States

Runways
Direction	Length		Surface
Direction	ft	m	Surface
3/21	7,360	2,243	Asphalt
15/33	2,000	610	Gravel

Statistics (2018)
- Aircraft operations: 15,750
- Based aircraft: 46
- Source: Federal Aviation Administration

Canyonlands Regional Airport, Moab (IATA: CNY, ICAO: KCNY, FAA LID: CNY) is a regional commercial airport in Grand County, Utah, United States, 21 miles (34 km; 18 nmi) northwest of Moab. The airport services are subsidized by the Essential Air Service program.

The Federal Aviation Administration reported 2,870 enplanements (passenger boardings) at the airport in calendar year 2008, 3,982 in 2009, 2,701 in 2010, 9,181 in 2011, 7,955 in 2012, 7,048 in 2013, and 9,843 (unofficial) in 2017. The National Plan of Integrated Airport Systems for 2011–2015 categorized it as a non-primary commercial service airport (between 2,500 and 10,000 enplanements per year).

== History ==
Canyonlands Regional Airport opened about 1964–1965, with the 6,900-foot (2,100 m) runway 15/33, 140-foot (43 m) wide. 1985 airport info This runway was replaced in 1985 with the current northeast–southwest-oriented runway, 75 feet wide. In the latter 2010s, the terminal building was greatly expanded to handle upcoming 50-seat regional jets.

=== Historical airline service ===
From 1959 to 1965, the original Frontier Airlines served the previous airfield, Grand County Airport (38.488°N 109.449°W), eight miles southeast of Moab, followed by service to Canyonlands from 1965 to 1975. In 1959, Frontier Douglas DC-3s flew direct to Denver with stops in Grand Junction, Montrose, Gunnison, and Pueblo. From the new airport, Frontier Convair 580s flew direct to Albuquerque, Denver, El Paso, Phoenix, Salt Lake City, and Tucson via intermediate en route stops. By late 1970, Frontier 580s flew to Denver via Grand Junction. Service was paused in 1973 for airport construction at which time Western Air Stages provided flights to Grand Junction using a much smaller Beechcraft Queen Air model 80. Frontier returned in late 1973 but then ended all service by late 1974.

Several commuter airlines then served Moab mainly with flights to Salt Lake City, Denver, or Grand Junction. These carriers are funded through the federal government Essential Air Service Program, and their service comes up for bid every two years. These airlines included:

- Sun Valley Key Commuter 1974–1976, Piper Navajos to Salt Lake City and Grand Junction. Frontier Airlines timetables listed Sun Valley Key flights between Moab and Grand Junction to connect with Frontier to Denver until mid-1976.
- SkyWest Airlines, summer 1975, Piper Navajos to Page, Arizona and Las Vegas, Nevada.
- Transwestern Airlines 1977/1980, Piper Navajos to Salt Lake City and Blanding, Utah.
- Alpine Air 1984 through the latter 1990s, Pipers to Salt Lake City. The OAG shows no air service to Moab for several years in the late 1990s.
- Sunrise Airlines 2000 thru early 2001 with BAe Jetstream 31's to Salt Lake City.
- Great Lakes Airlines dba United Express June 7, 2001, to early 2004, Beech 1900Ds to Denver and Phoenix. The Phoenix flight stopped in Page, Arizona. The representation as United Express ended in early 2002 and Great Lakes continued serving Moab under their own identity.
- Salmon Air, May 2004 to June 2006, Piper Navajos to Salt Lake City.
- Air Midwest dba America West Express, July 2, 2006, to November 3, 2007, Beechcraft 1900Ds to Salt Lake City and Phoenix. The Phoenix flight stopped in Farmington, New Mexico.
- Air Midwest dba US Airways Express, November 4, 2007, to January 5, 2008, same as above.
- Great Lakes Airlines returned on January 6, 2008, operating under their own identity with two daily Beechcraft 1900Ds to Denver International Airport. Daily nonstop flights were later added to Vernal, Utah, Ely, Nevada, and Prescott, Arizona, as an extension of its Denver service. Great Lakes ended service to Moab in January 2014.
- SkyWest Airlines dba Delta Connection, March 2, 2014, to April 2015, Embraer 120s to Salt Lake City. SkyWest prematurely discontinued service due to the retirement of the Embraer Brasilia prop aircraft and there was then no air service at Moab for the next year.
- Boutique Air, March 30, 2016, to February 28, 2018, Pilatus PC-12s to Denver and Salt Lake City.
- SkyWest Airlines returned on May 1, 2018 (now as United Express) with Canadair CRJ-200s to Denver after the Moab airport runway was improved to handle regional jets.
- Delta Air Lines returned on May 5, 2021, with daily summer seasonal service to Salt Lake City International Airport flown by Delta Connection partner SkyWest using CRJ-200.
- Contour Airlines replaced SkyWest with service to Phoenix Sky Harbor International Airport on February 1, 2024. They added flights to Denver on April 1, 2025.

== Airlines and destinations ==
=== Passenger ===
Airlines	Destinations
Delta Connection	Salt Lake City
United Express	Denver

Previous Delta Connection service was operated by regional airline partner SkyWest using CRJ-200 regional jet aircraft. Previous United Express service was operated by SkyWest Airlines via a code sharing agreement with United Airlines and was flown with Canadair CRJ-200s. Both services were replaced by Contour Airlines with service to Phoenix.

After service from Countour, in March 2026 the airport recommended that SkyWest be brought back to take over the service once again.

Destinations map
Destinations from Canyonlands Regional Airport

== Facilities ==
Canyonlands Regional Airport covers 985 acres (399 ha) at an elevation of 4,555 feet (1,388 m). Its runways, 3/21, is 7,360 by 100 feet (2,243 m × 30 m) asphalt, with displaced thresholds, and a gravel runway which is 2,000 by 60 feet (610 m × 18 m).

In the year ending December 31, 2018 the airport had 15,750 aircraft operations, average 43 per day: 71% general aviation, 28% air taxi, and 2% military. 46 aircraft were then based at this airport: 40 single-engine, 1 multi-engine, 3 helicopters and 2 ultralight.

With the addition of regional jets in 2018, the terminal building underwent a major expansion.

== Accidents and incidents ==
- On August 22, 2008, a Beechcraft King Air, operating for Southwest Skin and Cancer LLC, leased from Leavitt Group Wings, LLC, impacted hilly terrain about 1.2 miles south of CNY shortly after takeoff in visual meteorological conditions bound for Cedar City Regional Airport. All ten occupants (nine passengers, one pilot) were killed.
- On October 1, 2023, a single-engine Piper plane carrying North Dakota state senator Doug Larsen, his wife and their two young children crashed 15 miles north of CNY shortly after takeoff. The plane, piloted by Larsen, who was a lieutenant colonel in the North Dakota Army National Guard, stopped to refuel at CNY on the way back to North Dakota after visiting family in Scottsdale. All four occupants were killed.

== See also ==
- List of airports in Utah
