= U34 =

U34 may refer to:

- German submarine U-34, various vessels
- Green River Municipal Airport, in Emery County, Utah, United States
- Small nucleolar RNA SNORD34
- Small stellated dodecahedron
