= List of airports in Utah =

This is a list of airports in Utah (a U.S. state), grouped by type and sorted by location. It contains all public-use and military airports in the state. Some private-use and former airports may be included where notable, such as airports that were previously public-use, those with commercial enplanements recorded by the FAA or airports assigned an IATA airport code.

== Airports ==
This list contains the following information:

- **City served** – The city generally associated with the airport, as per the airport's master record with the Federal Aviation Administration. This is not always the actual location since some airports are located in smaller towns outside of the city they serve. It is not meant to be a complete list of cities served, which can be found in or added to each airport's Wikipedia article.
- **FAA** – The location identifier assigned by the Federal Aviation Administration (FAA).
- **IATA** – The airport code assigned by the International Air Transport Association (IATA). Those that do not match the FAA code are shown in bold.
- **ICAO** – The location indicator assigned by the International Civil Aviation Organization (ICAO).
- **Airport name** – The official airport name. Those shown in **bold** indicate the airport has scheduled passenger service on commercial airlines.
- **Role** – One of four FAA airport categories, as per the 2023–2027 National Plan of Integrated Airport Systems (NPIAS) report released October 2022:
  - P-s: Commercial service – primary are publicly owned airports that receive scheduled passenger service and have more than 10,000 passenger boardings (enplanements) each year. Each primary airport is sub-classified by the FAA as one of the following four "hub" types (s):
    - L: Large hub that accounts for at least 1% of total U.S. passenger enplanements.
    - M: Medium hub that accounts for between 0.25% and 1% of total U.S. passenger enplanements.
    - S: Small hub that accounts for between 0.05% and 0.25% of total U.S. passenger enplanements.
    - N: Nonhub that accounts for less than 0.05% of total U.S. passenger enplanements, but more than 10,000 annual enplanements.
  - CS: Commercial service – nonprimary are publicly owned airports that receive scheduled passenger service and have at least 2,500 passenger boardings each year.
  - R: Reliever airports are designated by the FAA to relieve congestion at a large commercial service airport and to provide more general aviation access to the overall community.
  - GA: General aviation airports are the largest single group of airports in the U.S. airport system. They are public-use airports that do not have scheduled service or have scheduled service with less than 2,500 passenger boardings each year.
- **Enplanements** – The number of enplanements (commercial passenger boardings) that occurred at the airport in calendar year 2024, as per FAA records released October 2025.

City served	FAA	IATA	ICAO	Airport name	Role	Enplanements (2024)
				**Commercial service – primary airports**		
Cedar City	CDC	CDC	KCDC	**Cedar City Regional Airport**	P-N	11,855
Moab	CNY	CNY	KCNY	**Canyonlands Regional Airport**	P-N	10,625
Ogden	OGD	OGD	KOGD	**Ogden–Hinckley Airport**	P-N	15,582
Provo	PVU	PVU	KPVU	**Provo Municipal Airport**	P-N	455,219
St. George	SGU	SGU	KSGU	**St. George Regional Airport**	P-N	161,201
Salt Lake City	SLC	SLC	KSLC	**Salt Lake City International Airport**	P-L	13,543,570
				**Commercial service – nonprimary airports**		
Vernal	VEL	VEL	KVEL	**Vernal Regional Airport** (was Vernal-Uintah Co. Airport)	CS	10,578
				**Reliever airports**		
West Jordan	SVR		KSVR	South Valley Regional Airport (was Salt Lake City Muni 2)	R	44
				**General aviation airports**		
Beaver	U52			Beaver Municipal Airport	GA	0
Blanding	BDG	BDG	KBDG	Blanding Municipal Airport	GA	0
Brigham City	BMC	BMC	KBMC	Brigham City Regional Airport	GA	0
Bryce Canyon	BCE	BCE	KBCE	Bryce Canyon Airport	GA	39
Delta	DTA	DTA	KDTA	Delta Municipal Airport	GA	0
Duchesne	U69			Duchesne Municipal Airport	GA	0
Escalante	1L7			Escalante Municipal Airport	GA	8
Green River	U34	RVR		Green River Municipal Airport	GA	0
Halls Crossing	U96			Cal Black Memorial Airport	GA	13
Hanksville	HVE	HVE	KHVE	Hanksville Airport	GA	0
Heber City	HCR		KHCR	Heber Valley Airport	GA	613
Hurricane	1L8			General Dick Stout Field	GA	21
Kanab	KNB	KNB	KKNB	Kanab Municipal Airport	GA	779
Loa	38U			Wayne Wonderland Airport	GA	0
Logan	LGU	LGU	KLGU	Logan-Cache Airport	GA	964
Manti	41U	NTJ		Manti-Ephraim Airport	GA	0
Milford	MLF	MLF	KMLF	Milford Municipal Airport (Ben and Judy Briscoe Field)	GA	0
Monticello	U64	MXC		Monticello Airport	GA	0
Nephi	U14	NPH		Nephi Municipal Airport	GA	0
Panguitch	U55	PNU		Panguitch Municipal Airport	GA	7
Parowan	1L9			Parowan Airport	GA	0
Price	PUC	PUC	KPUC	Carbon County Regional Airport (Buck Davis Field)	GA	0
Richfield	RIF	RIF	KRIF	Richfield Municipal Airport	GA	2
Roosevelt	74V			Roosevelt Municipal Airport	GA	0
Spanish Fork	SPK		KSPK	Spanish Fork Municipal Airport Woodhouse Field	GA	66
Tooele	TVY		KTVY	Tooele Valley Airport (Bolinder Field)	GA	2
Wendover	ENV	ENV	KENV	Wendover Airport	GA	0
				**Other public-use airports** (not listed in NPIAS)		
Bluff	66V			Bluff Airport		
Bountiful	BTF	BTF	KBTF	Skypark Airport		
Dutch John	33U			Dutch John Airport		
Fairfield	UT9			West Desert Airpark		
Fillmore	FOM	FIL	KFOM	Fillmore Municipal Airport		
Glen Canyon	U07	BFG		Bullfrog Basin Airport		
Huntington	69V			Huntington Municipal Airport		2
Junction	U13			Junction Airport		
Manila	40U			Manila Airport		
Morgan	42U			Morgan County Airport		
Salina	44U	SBO		Salina-Gunnison Airport		
				**Other military airports**		
Dugway Proving Ground	DPG	DPG	KDPG	Michael Army Airfield		
Ogden	HIF	HIF	KHIF	Hill Air Force Base		249
				**Notable private-use airports**		
Hanksville	UT03			Hite Airport (owned by Glen Canyon NRA)		2,216
Oljato-Monument Valley	UT25	GMV		Monument Valley Airport (owned by Goulding's Lodge)		1,003
Fruitland	UT83			Thunder Ridge Airpark		
				**Notable former airports**		
Eagle Mountain	~~17U~~			Jake Garn Airport (closed 2009?)		
Mount Pleasant	~~43U~~	~~MSD~~		Mount Pleasant Airport (closed 2016)		
St. George	~~SGU~~	~~SGU~~	~~KSGU~~	St. George Municipal Airport (closed 2010)	~~P-N~~	
Tooele	~~U26~~			Tooele Municipal Airport (closed after 1989)		
Tremonton	~~U27~~	~~TRT~~		Tremonton Municipal Airport (closed 1999)		

== See also ==
- Essential Air Service
- Utah World War II Army Airfields
- Wikipedia:WikiProject Aviation/Airline destination lists: North America#Utah
