= U64 =

U64 may refer to:

- German submarine U-64, various vessels
- Great snub dodecicosidodecahedron
- HMS Nereide (U64), a sloop of the Royal Navy
- Monticello Airport (Utah)
- Small nucleolar RNA SNORA64/SNORA10 family
- uint64_t, a 64-bit unsigned integer
