= Logan-Cache Airport =

Airport in Utah, United States of America

- IATA: LGU; ICAO: KLGU; FAA LID: LGU

Summary
- Airport type: Public
- Owner: Management and Airport Authority of Logan City
- Operator: Utah State University LE Aviation (Leading Edge Aviation)
- Serves: Cache Valley of northern Utah and southeastern Idaho
- Location: North Logan, Utah
- Focus city for: Gem Air; Ameriflight; UPS (on contract flights); FedEx (on contract flights); Private or charter arrangements
- Time zone: Mountain (UTC−7)
  - Summer (DST): (UTC−6)
- Elevation AMSL: 4,457 ft / 1,358 m
- Coordinates: 41.79°N 111.85°W
- Website: logan-cacheairport.org

Maps
- FAA Diagram as of 2022
- Location in the United States Location in Utah

Runways
Direction	Length		Surface
Direction	ft	m	Surface
17/35	9,020	2,749	Asphalt
10/28	4,075	1,242	Asphalt

Statistics (2024)
- Aircraft movements: 109,245
- Source: 2024 Logan/Cache Valley Airport Audit

Logan-Cache Airport (IATA: LGU, ICAO: KLGU, FAA LID: LGU) is an airport in the western United States in Cache County, Utah, located three miles (5 km) northwest of Logan. It is owned under the Logan-Cache Airport Authority, formed by Inter-local Agreement between Cache County and Logan City in 1992. This organization is subsidized by the city and county, having no authority to tax or bond for additional funding. Revenues are derived from leases of land, buildings, fuel and maintenance fees. The airport was previously owned by Cache County and managed by county commissioners. It is the second busiest airport in Utah by number of aircraft operations, with 109,245 in 2024.

== History & services ==
Western Airlines served Logan from 1946 until West Coast Airlines replaced them in 1959; West Coast pulled out in 1964. Key Airlines served the airport from Salt Lake City from 1964 to 1976. In that year, Utah carrier Transwestern Airlines had its company headquartered at the airport, with flights to their hub at Salt Lake City, until its acquisition by Horizon Air in December 1983.

Currently, scheduled services come from Ameriflight and Gem Air under contract for UPS and FedEx Express, transporting from several nearby states. Frequent charter flights occur on behalf of Utah State University's athletic teams and their opponents. Utah State also occupies several hangars on the north end of the airport access road for its fixed-wing and rotorcraft training programs, and operates the dispatch office in the main passenger terminal.

The airport also hosts LE Aviation (Leading Edge Aviation), which offers flight training, FBO services, and a pilot supply shop. LE Aviation provides Avgas and jet fuel services, hangar and tie-down facilities, oxygen service, ground power unit (GPU) support, lavatory service, aircraft detailing, and 24-hour call-out availability. Facilities also include a pilot lounge, flight-planning area, and a courtesy car for visiting pilots.

== Facilities ==
The Logan-Cache Airport covers 739 acres (1.15 mi^{2}; 2.99 km^{2}) with two runways:

- 17/35: 9,020 by 100 feet (2,749 m × 30 m) Asphalt
- 10/28: 4,075 by 60 feet (1,242 m × 18 m) Asphalt
- Two non-operational control towers

This airport remains a Class G, uncontrolled airport, with Class E airspace beginning at 700 ft AGL.

== Incidents & Accidents ==
- January 9, 2005: A Grumman Gulfstream II operated by the Icon Health and Fitness, registered N74RQ, impacted a snow bank during a final approach after the pilot had failed to conduct a proper IFR operation, after arriving from Charles B. Wheeler Downtown Airport, in Kansas City, Missouri. The plane had 2 crew and 7 passengers. No one was killed or injured.
- February 2, 2013: A Cessna 175 Skylark that had taken off from this airport had to make an emergency landing in a nearby field due to carburetor ice.
- July 18, 2016: a Diamond DA40 operated by Utah State University, registered as N419FP, was destroyed in Paradise during a training flight from the airport, with one fatality. The student pilot killed exceeded the critical angle of attack, and resulted in a flat spin stall. This became the first fatal crash in the USU Aviation Program and the first plane crash in its history.
- June 24, 2022: A Cessna 152, registered N934JH and owned by USU, crashed near Mendon, Utah. Neither the student nor the instructor aboard survived.

== See also ==
- List of airports in Utah
