= WAAA =

WAAA or WaaA may refer to:

== Genes ==
- Lipid IVA 3-deoxy-D-manno-octulosonic acid transferase, an enzyme
- (KDO)2-lipid IVA (2-8) 3-deoxy-D-manno-octulosonic acid transferase
- (KDO)3-lipid IVA (2-4) 3-deoxy-D-manno-octulosonic acid transferase

== Radio stations ==
- WAAA-LD, a low-power television station (channel 16, virtual 49) licensed to serve Valparaiso, Indiana, United States; see List of television stations in Indiana
- WTOB (AM), a radio station (980 AM) licensed to Winston-Salem, North Carolina, United States, which used the call sign WAAA until June 2006
- WKZL, a radio station (107.5 FM) licensed to Winston-Salem, North Carolina, which once used the call sign WAAA-FM

== Other uses ==
- Women's Amateur Athletic Association, former governing body of athletics for women in England
- Wiltshire Air Ambulance Appeal, a charity that raises money for the Wiltshire Air Ambulance
- We Are America Alliance, a national alliance of immigrant rights organizations and allies in the United States
- the ICAO code for Sultan Hasanuddin International Airport
