= Vernal Regional Airport =

Vernal Regional Airport Vernal - Uintah County Airport

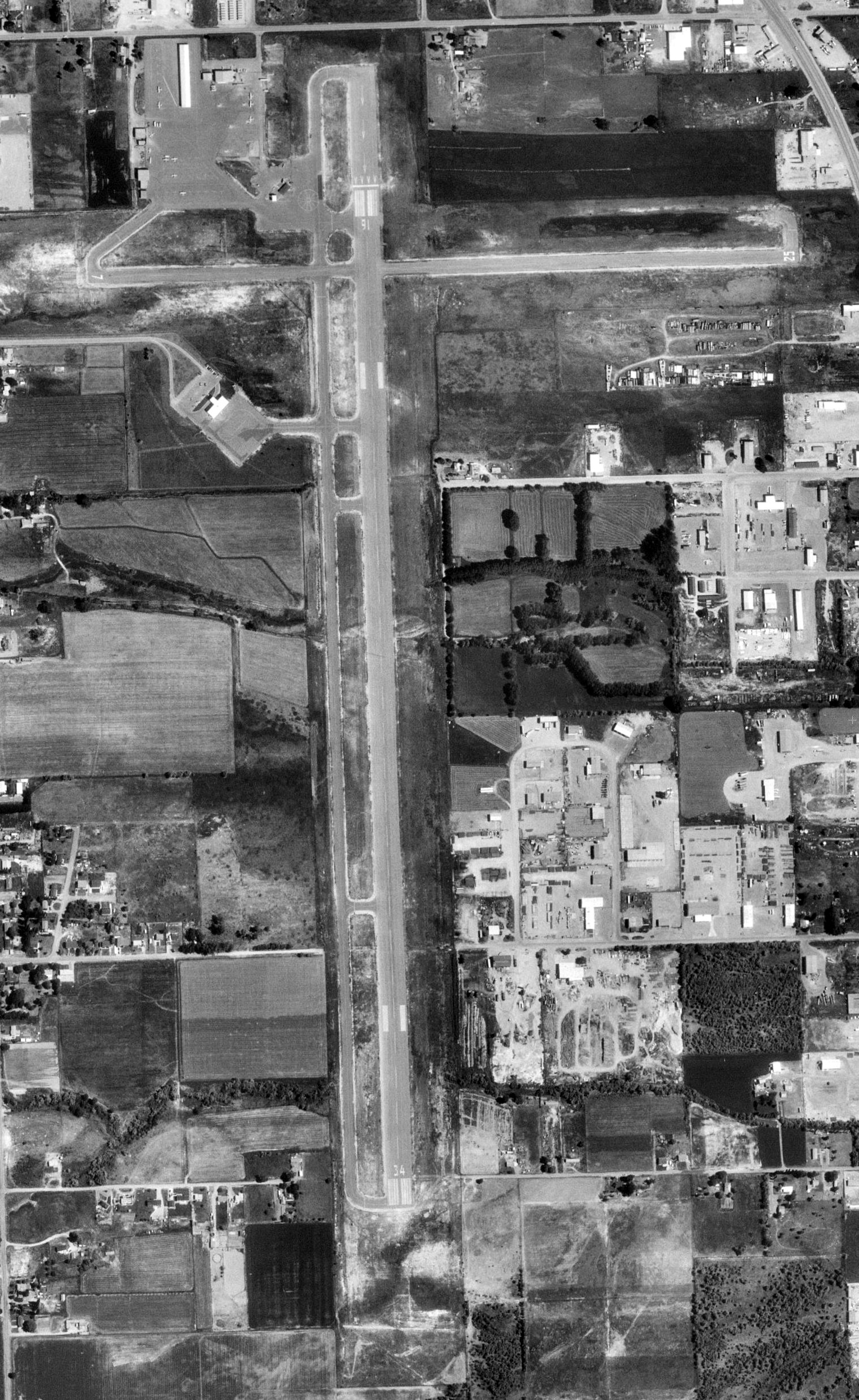
- USGS 1997 orthophoto
- IATA: VEL; ICAO: KVEL; FAA LID: VEL

Summary
- Airport type: Public
- Owner: Uintah County & Vernal City
- Serves: Vernal, Utah
- Elevation AMSL: 5,274 ft (1,608 m)
- Coordinates: 40°26′27″N 109°30′36″W
- Website: VEL Website

Map
- Location of airport in Utah VEL (the United States)

Runways
Direction	Length		Surface
Direction	ft	m	Surface
17/35	7,000	2,134	Asphalt

Statistics (2018)
- Aircraft operations: 8,600
- Based aircraft: 30
- Source: Federal Aviation Administration

Vernal Regional Airport (IATA: VEL, ICAO: KVEL, FAA LID: VEL) is a mile southeast of Vernal, in Uintah County, Utah. It is owned by the city and county and sees one airline, subsidized by the Essential Air Service program.

Federal Aviation Administration records say the airport had 5,474 passenger boardings (enplanements) in calendar year 2008, 3,805 in 2009 and 4,461 in 2010. The National Plan of Integrated Airport Systems for 2011–2015 categorized it as a non-primary commercial service airport (between 2,500 and 10,000 enplanements per year).

== History ==
The original Frontier Airlines (1950-1986) served Vernal for over 30 years. In 1950 Frontier Douglas DC-3s flew nonstop to Salt Lake City and Rock Springs and direct to Denver, Billings, Casper, Laramie and Cheyenne. By 1967 Frontier Convair 580s flew nonstop to Salt Lake City and direct to Denver. Frontier then flew a Convair 580 Salt Lake City-Vernal-Moab-Grand Junction-Farmington-Gallup-Albuquerque-Silver City-Tucson-Phoenix.

Frontier served Vernal until the early 1980s with Convair 580s nonstop to Salt Lake City and direct to Denver; Frontier left Vernal by 1982. Prior to Frontier's service, a Challenger Airlines 1948 route map depicted Vernal as a proposed destination with service to Salt Lake City. In 1950, Challenger merged with Arizona Airways and Monarch Airlines to form Frontier Airlines (1950–1986) which began service that year to Vernal.

A number of commuter airlines served Vernal. In 1979 Transwestern Airlines was competing with Frontier on the Salt Lake City route with Piper Aircraft. Salmon Air flew nonstop to Salt Lake City at one point. By 1983, Air Link Airlines was operating direct, one stop flights to Denver via Hayden, CO or Rock Springs, WY with Swearingen Metroliners. In 1985, SkyWest Airlines Swearingen Metroliners flew nonstop to Salt Lake City as an independent airline.

By 1987, SkyWest was flying Metroliners nonstop to SLC as Western Express via a code share agreement with Western Airlines. In 1989 SkyWest had become a Delta Connection air carrier operating code share service for Delta Air Lines flying nonstop Metroliners to Salt Lake City. Air Midwest, a subsidiary of Mesa Airlines which flew to Vernal as America West Express, commenced nonstop flights to Salt Lake City International Airport on July 2, 2006.

In January 2008 Great Lakes Aviation replaced Air Midwest and began flying Beechcraft 1900Ds to Denver and on December 5, 2011, Great Lakes began service to Canyonlands Field in Moab, Utah as an extension of its Denver service. However, Great Lakes Airlines subsequently ended its flights to Denver and ceased all service to Vernal.

== Facilities ==
The airport covers 393 acres (159 ha) at an elevation of 5,274 feet (1,608 m). It has one asphalt runway: 17/35 is 7,000 by 100 feet (2,134 x 30 m).

In the year ending December 31, 2018, the airport had 8,600 aircraft operations, average 24 per day: 76% general aviation, 23% air taxi, and 1% military. 30 aircraft were then based at the airport: 27 single-engine, 1 multi-engine, 1 jet, and 1 helicopter.

== Airlines and destinations ==
=== Passenger ===
Airlines	Destinations	Refs.
Contour Airlines	Denver, Phoenix–Sky Harbor	

United Express service to Denver was operated by SkyWest Airlines via a code sharing agreement with United Airlines flying with the Canadair CRJ-200 regional jets. Service was replaced by Contour Airlines with service to Phoenix beginning February 1, 2024.

Destinations map
Destinations from Canyonlands Regional Airport

== See also ==
- List of airports in Utah
