= U55 =

U55 or U-55 may refer to:

- U55 (Berlin U-Bahn)
- German submarine U-55, various vessels
- Panguitch Municipal Airport, in Garfield County, Utah, United States
- Truncated great icosahedron
