= Blanding Municipal Airport =

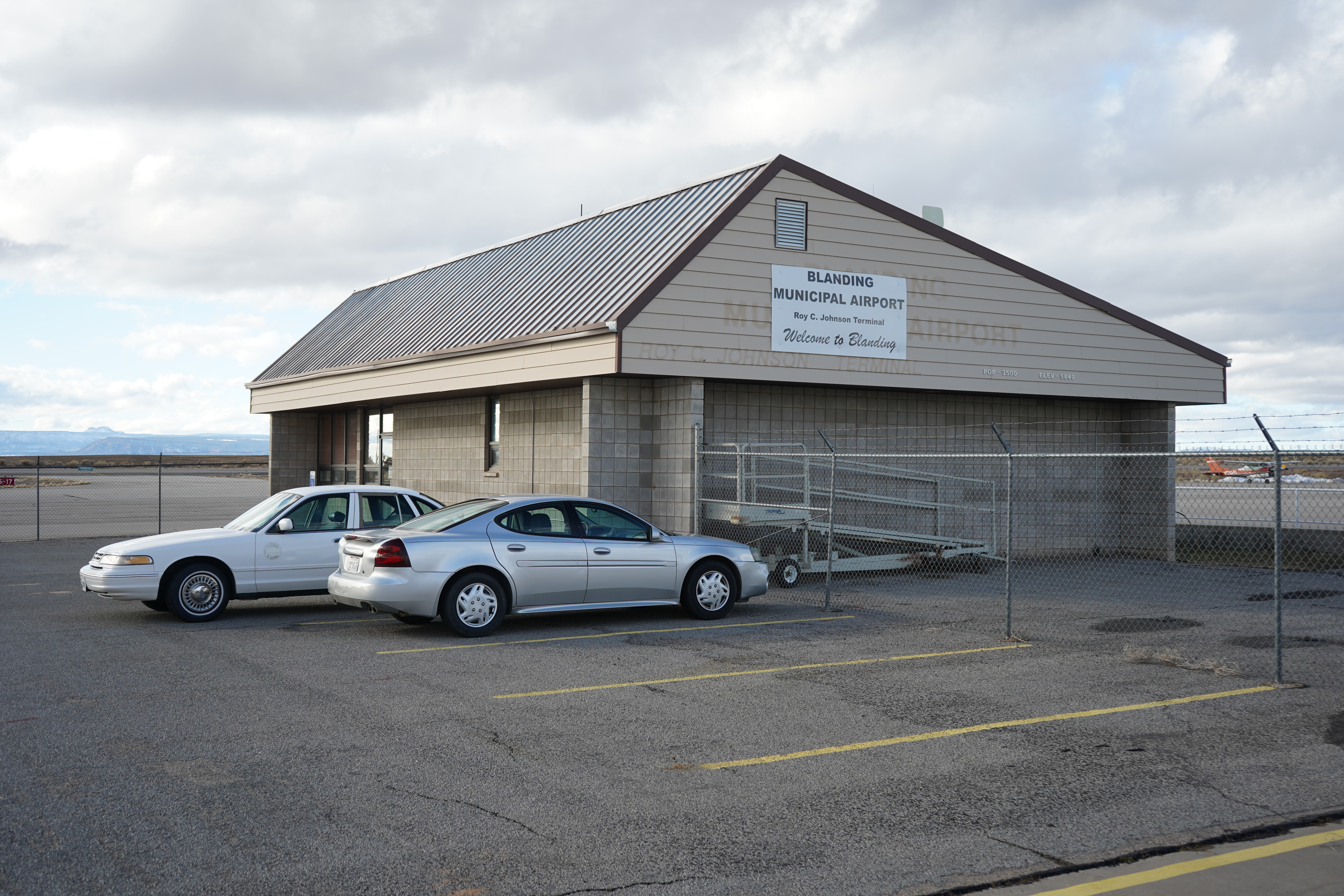
- IATA: BDG; ICAO: KBDG; FAA LID: BDG

Summary
- Airport type: Public
- Owner: Blanding City
- Serves: Blanding, Utah
- Elevation AMSL: 5,868 ft (1,789 m)
- Coordinates: 37°35′00″N 109°29′0″W

Map
- Location within Utah

Runways
Direction	Length		Surface
Direction	ft	m	Surface
17/35	5,781	1,762	Asphalt

Statistics (2007)
- Aircraft operations: 6,154
- Source: Federal Aviation Administration

Blanding Municipal Airport (IATA: BDG, ICAO: KBDG, FAA LID: BDG) is a city-owned public-use airport located three nautical miles (6 km) south of the central business district of Blanding, a city in San Juan County, Utah, United States.

== History ==
Blanding saw commuter airline service with direct flights to Moab and Salt Lake City, Utah by at least three carriers from the 1970s through the 1990s:

Sun Valley Key Commuter flew Piper Navajo's in 1976.

Transwestern Airlines flew Aero Commander's and single engine Cessna aircraft from 1977 through 1980.

Alpine Air then provided service in 1984 and 1985. After that, on-demand charter service was provided by Scenic Aviation in connection with Alpine Air into the 1990s for service to Moab and connecting flights to Salt Lake City.

== Facilities and aircraft ==
Blanding Municipal Airport covers an area of 124 acres (50 ha) at an elevation of 5,868 feet (1,789 m) above mean sea level. It has one asphalt paved runway designated 17/35 is 5,781 by 75 feet (1,762 x 23 m). For the 12-month period ending December 31, 2007, the airport had 6,154 aircraft operations, an average of 16 per day: 98% general aviation and 2% air taxi.

== See also ==
- List of airports in Utah
