= KDTA =

KDTA may refer to:

- Delta Municipal Airport (ICAO code KDTA)
- KJYE, a radio station (1400 AM) licensed to serve Delta, Colorado, United States, which held the call sign KDTA until 1986 and from 1988 to 2012

KdtA is the name of several genes.
