= Magic Valley Regional Airport =

Airport in Idaho, United States

Magic Valley Regional Airport Joslin Field
- IATA: TWF; ICAO: KTWF; FAA LID: TWF

Summary
- Airport type: Public
- Owner: City & County of Twin Falls
- Operator: Bill Carberry
- Serves: Twin Falls, Idaho
- Elevation AMSL: 4,154 ft (1,266 m)
- Coordinates: 42°28′54″N 114°29′16″W
- Website: www.tfid.org

Map
- Location of airport in Idaho TWF (the United States)

Runways
Direction	Length		Surface
Direction	ft	m	Surface
8/26	8,703	2,653	Asphalt
12/30	3,224	983	Asphalt

Statistics (2019)
- Aircraft operations: 34,611
- Based aircraft: 111
- Source: Federal Aviation Administration

Magic Valley Regional Airport (IATA: TWF, ICAO: KTWF, FAA LID: TWF), also known as Joslin Field, is a public use airport located four nautical miles (7 km) south of the central business district of Twin Falls, Idaho. The airport is owned by the City and County of Twin Falls. It is mostly used for general aviation but is also served by two commercial airlines.

As per the Federal Aviation Administration, this airport had 29,606 passenger boardings (enplanements) in calendar year 2008, 26,991 in 2009, and 35,576 in 2010. The National Plan of Integrated Airport Systems for 2011–2015 categorized it as a primary commercial service airport.

== Facilities and aircraft ==
The facility covers 1,468 acres (2.3 mi^{2}; 5.9 km^{2}) at an elevation of 4,154 feet (1,266 m) above sea level, approximately four hundred feet (120 m) above Twin Falls' city center. It has two runways with asphalt surfaces: 8/26 is 8,703 by 150 feet (2,653 by 46 m) and 12/30 is 3,224 by 75 feet (983 by 23 m).

For the 12-month period ending January 1, 2020, the airport had 34,611 aircraft operations, an average of 95 per day: 82% general aviation, 14% air taxi, 3% military, and 1% scheduled commercial. At that time there were 111 aircraft based at this airport: 84 single-engine, 18 multi-engine, 8 helicopter, and 1 jet.

== Historical airline service ==
=== Prop Service ===
West Coast Airlines and its successors Air West, Hughes Airwest and Republic Airlines (1979–1986) served the airport for many years. In 1954, West Coast was serving Twin Falls with nonstop Douglas DC-3 flights to Boise and Burley/Rupert in Idaho with direct service to Pocatello and Idaho Falls and connecting flights to Portland, OR (PDX) and Boeing Field (BFI) in Seattle WA. By 1960, West Coast had introduced new Fairchild F-27 turboprops with service to Twin Falls nonstop twice daily from both Boise (BOI) and Salt Lake City (SLC) as well as direct twice daily F-27 service from Seattle Boeing Field (BFI) via en route stops at Yakima, WA (YKM), Walla Walla, WA (ALW), Lewiston, ID (LWS) and Boise (BOI).

In 1968, West Coast merged with Bonanza Air Lines and Pacific Air Lines to form Air West which continued to serve Twin Falls. During this time, Air West was still operating Fairchild F-27 turboprops with nonstop flights to both Boise and Salt Lake City. According to the July 1, 1968 Air West system timetable, Twin Falls was receiving international service of a sorts at this time, which consisted of direct, no change of plane Fairchild F-27 service from Calgary in Alberta, Canada with this flight operating a southbound routing of Calgary (YYC) - Spokane (GEG) - Pullman, WA (PUW) - Lewiston, ID (LWS) - Boise (BOI) - Twin Falls (TWF) - Salt Lake City (SLC). This same Air West timetable also lists several other multi-stop flights that served the airport at this time including a southbound Boise (BOI) - Twin Falls (TWF) - Salt Lake City (SLC) - Cedar City, UT (CDC) - Page, AZ (PGA) - Grand Canyon National Park Airport (GCN) - Prescott, AZ (PRC) - Phoenix (PHX) service flown with an F-27, a northbound Phoenix (PHX) - Cedar City (CDC) - Salt Lake City (SLC) - Twin Falls (TWF) - Boise (BOI) - Lewiston, ID (LWS) - Pullman, WA (PUW) - Walla Walla, WA (ALW) - Pasco, WA (PSC) - Yakima, WA (YKM) - Seattle Boeing Field (BFI) service also flown with an F-27, and a Twin Falls (TWF) - Burley, ID (BYI) - Sun Valley, ID (SUN) - Boise (BOI) - Ontario, OR (ONO) - Baker, OR (BKE) - Portland, OR (PDX) flight operated with a small Piper PA-31 Navajo twin prop aircraft. Air West then subsequently changed it name to Hughes Airwest which in turn continued to serve Twin Falls.

=== The Jet Age ===
The jet age arrived in Twin Falls during the early 1970s. In 1972, Hughes Airwest was operating four daily jet flights from Twin Falls with Douglas DC-9-10 and McDonnell Douglas DC-9-30 aircraft with nonstop service twice daily to both Boise (BOI) and Salt Lake City (SLC) and direct, no change of plane jet service to Los Angeles (LAX), Harry Reid International Airport (LAS), (SEA), Spokane International Airport (GEG), Hollywood Burbank Airport (BUR), Pasco (PSC), and Lewiston-Nez Perce County Airport (LWS). The July 1, 1972 Hughes Airwest system timetable stated that Twin Falls was the "jet gateway" for the Sun Valley, Idaho summer and ski resort area as the Friedman Memorial Airport (SUN) serving Sun Valley did not have airline jet flights at this time and was only served by commuter air carriers operating turboprop and prop aircraft during the 1970s. By 1975, Hughes Airwest was continuing to operate all flights into Twin Falls with DC-9-10 and DC-9-30 jets with service to Boise (BOI), Salt Lake City (SLC), Stockton (SCK), Pocatello (PIH), San Francisco (SFO), Los Angeles (LAX), Orange County (SNA), Las Vegas (LAS), Seattle (SEA), Portland, OR (PDX), Spokane (GEG) and Idaho Falls (IDA). During the ski season in early 1976, the airline had added nonstop DC-9 flights between Twin Falls and both Los Angeles (LAX) and San Francisco (SFO) which were operated only on Saturdays.

According to the February 1, 1976 Official Airline Guide, Hughes Airwest was the only airline operating jet service into Twin Falls at this time with eight DC-9 jet flights a day operated to the airport on Saturdays with a lesser number of jet flights operated on other days of the week. This same OAG also lists direct, no change of plane DC-9 flights operated from Los Angeles, San Francisco, Las Vegas, Seattle, Portland, OR, Santa Ana/Orange County, Santa Barbara, Spokane, Idaho Falls and Lewiston, ID in addition to daily nonstop DC-9 flights from Boise, Salt Lake City, Stockton, CA and Pocatello. In 1980, the airline was still operating DC-9 jet service nonstop to Boise and Salt Lake City with one stop direct flights to Burbank, Phoenix and Portland, OR as well as direct, no change of plane DC-9 flights to Seattle, Spokane and Tucson.

Hughes Airwest was then acquired by and merged into Republic Airlines (1979-1986) which continued to serve Twin Falls. In 1982, Republic was operating DC-9 jet service from the airport nonstop to Boise, Salt Lake City and Pocatello with direct, no change of plane jet flights to Seattle, Spokane and Burbank. By 1984, Western Airlines was serving Twin Falls on a seasonal basis with nonstop flights from Los Angeles (LAX), San Francisco (SFO) and Salt Lake City (SLC) operated with Boeing 737-200 jetliners. However, by 1985, both Republic and Western had ceased serving Twin Falls and the airport no longer had jet service at this time. Jet service then briefly returned in early 1993 when Morris Air was operating nonstop Boeing 737-300 flights to Salt Lake City (SLC). In 1995, jet service then returned once again according to the Official Airline Guide (OAG) as United Airlines was operating mainline jet flights on Saturdays only during the 1995 winter snow skiing season nonstop from Chicago O'Hare Airport (ORD) with Boeing 737-300 aircraft.

=== Commuter air carrier service ===
Several commuter air carriers also served Twin Falls over the years. In the early 1970s, Trans Magic Airlines (TMA), which was based in Twin Falls, was operating a hub at the airport with flights to Boise, Burley, Coeur d'Alene, Idaho Falls, Jackpot, Lewiston, McCall, Mountain Home Air Force Base, Moscow, Pocatello, Pullman, Salt Lake City and Sun Valley with this commuter airline flying de Havilland Heron four engine prop aircraft and Piper Navajo twin engine prop aircraft. By 1974, Air Idaho was operating a small hub at the airport with nonstop service to Boise, Burley, Elko, Salt Lake City and Sun Valley flown with de Havilland Heron aircraft. In 1976, another commuter air carrier, Sun Valley Key Airlines, was serving Twin Falls with flights from Salt Lake City and Pocatello operated with Piper Navajo prop aircraft while Air Idaho was continuing to operate flights from Salt Lake City and Sun Valley with the de Havilland Heron. Cascade Airways briefly served Twin Falls in 1980 with nonstop flights to Boise and Salt Lake City operated with Embraer EMB-110 Bandeirante commuter turboprops. In 1981, Mountain West Airlines-Idaho was operating nonstop flights to Boise with Embraer EMB-110 Bandeirante turboprops. Skywest Airlines began serving Twin Falls as an independent commuter airline during the early 1980s and by 1983 was operating nonstop flights to Salt Lake City and Pocatello with Swearingen Metro III commuter propjets. Also in 1983, Transwestern Airlines was operating nonstop flights to Boise and Salt Lake City with Swearingen Metro III commuter propjets. Later in 1983, Transwestern was then acquired by and merged into Horizon Air which in turn continued to operate nonstop flights to Boise and Salt Lake City with Swearingen Metro III propjets. Horizon continued service to Twin Falls for fourteen years, until April 1997.

=== Regional air carrier service ===
In 1987, SkyWest Airlines was operating as Western Express on behalf of Western Airlines via a code sharing agreement with nonstop flights to Salt Lake City and Pocatello operated Fairchild Swearingen Metro III commuter propjets. Western was then acquired by and merged into Delta Air Lines later in 1987 with SkyWest then becoming a Delta Connection air carrier via a code sharing agreement with Delta and this business relationship between the two airlines has been in effect since that time. In 1994, there were two airlines serving Twin Falls: Horizon Air operating code share service on behalf of Alaska Airlines with nonstop Metro III commuter propjet service to Boise and SkyWest operating Delta Connection service nonstop to Salt Lake City with Embraer EMB-120 Brasilia turboprops. By 1999, SkyWest flying as the Delta Connection was the only airline serving Twin Falls and was continuing to operate nonstop Embraer EMB-120 Brasila flights to Salt Lake City. SkyWest is currently the only airline operating scheduled passenger flights from the airport and has served Twin Falls for over 35 years. In 2014, Skywest began operating Bombardier CRJ-200 aircraft with United Airlines from Denver International Airport as a replacement for its aging EMB-120 propjets. In 2022, United stopped flying CRJ-200 aircraft into Twin Falls on March 31. In 2023, the CRJ-200 began officially retiring from the Delta Connection fleet, and in February 20 of that year, SkyWest began flying the Embraer E175 regional jet on its Delta Connection service to Salt Lake City as of late 2023.

== Boeing testing in Twin Falls ==
When Boeing 787 Dreamliners were being tested for service on October 3, 2013 and Federal Aviation Administration (FAA) approval, Boeing would bring their Boeing 787-8, -9, and -10 Dreamliners to Twin Falls and test takeoff performance and engine performance.

== Airlines and destinations ==
Airlines	Destinations
Breeze Airways	Las Vegas
Delta Connection	Salt Lake City

SkyWest Airlines, operating as Delta Connection on behalf of Delta Air Lines via a code sharing agreement, currently operates Embraer E175 regional jet flights nonstop to Salt Lake City (SLC).

== Statistics ==
Carrier shares: (May 2025 – April 2026)
Carrier	Passengers (arriving and departing)
SkyWest	68,340(96.22%)
Breeze	2,590(3.65%)

Top domestic destinations: (May 2025 – April 2026)
Rank	Airport	Passengers	Airline
1	Salt Lake City, Utah	34,470	Delta
2	Las Vegas, Nevada	1,540	Breeze

== Accidents and incidents ==
In 1965, a U.S. Navy S-2F Tracker crashed shortly after takeoff on January 11, killing all three crew members. The twin-engine anti-submarine attack plane was based in southern California at NAS Point Mugu, near Oxnard.

On February 4, 2025, a private owner, Beechcraft Bonanza crashed 1 mile north of the airport. The aircraft experienced a loss of power before crashing onto a muddy field. The aircraft flew under power lines narrowly and crashed about 10 to 20 feet away from the power lines. Nobody was injured in the accident. The National Transportation Safety Board (NTSB) is currently on investigation as the plane was removed on February 21 or 22. The plane was based in Twin Falls and appears to have been doing pattern work around the airport, doing only one "touch-and-go" at the airport before the accident occurred.

== See also ==
- List of airports in Idaho
