= KFOM =

KFOM may refer to:

- KFOM (FM), a radio station (88.7 FM) licensed to serve Stanton, Iowa, United States
- Fillmore Municipal Airport (ICAO code KFOM)
