= BDG =

BDG may refer to:

- Bandung, West Java, Indonesia
- Bendigo railway station (station code: BDG), a Victorian railway network station
- Blackmar–Diemer Gambit, a chess opening
- Blanding Municipal Airport (IATA code: BDG), a public-use airport in San Juan County, Utah
- Bonggi language (ISO 639-3 code: bdg), an Austronesian language
- Gabonese Democratic Party (originally Bloc Démocratique Gabonais), a political party
- Brian David Gilbert (born 1994), American writer, actor, voice actor, host, musician, and YouTuber
- Bydgoszcz, city in Poland
