= KBTF =

KBTF may refer to:

- Skypark Airport, Bountiful, Utah, US, ICAO code KBTF
- KBTF-CD, a low-power TV station serving Bakersfield, California, US
