= KSMN =

KSMN may refer to:

- KSMN (TV), a television station licensed to Worthington, Minnesota, US
- Lemhi County Airport, in Idaho, US, ICAO code KSMN
