= KBMC =

KBMC may refer to:

- KBMC (FM), a radio station (102.1 FM) licensed to serve Bozeman, Montana, United States
- KBMC-LP, a low-power radio station (104.5 FM) licensed to serve Mack's Creek, Missouri, United States
- Brigham City Airport (ICAO code KBMC)
