= KKNB =

KKNB may refer to:

- KKNB-LP, a low-power radio station (92.7 FM) licensed to serve Kanab, Utah, United States
- KIBZ, a radio station (104.1 FM) licensed to serve Crete, Nebraska, United States, which held the call sign KKNB from 1988 to 2001
- Kanab Municipal Airport (ICAO code KKNB)
