= Carbon County Regional Airport =

Airport in Utah, United States

Carbon County Regional Airport Buck Davis Field
- IATA: PUC; ICAO: KPUC; FAA LID: PUC

Summary
- Airport type: Public
- Owner: City of Price
- Serves: Price, Utah
- Elevation AMSL: 5,957.6 ft / 1,815.9 m
- Coordinates: 39°36′50″N 110°45′05″W

Map

Runways
Direction	Length		Surface
Direction	ft	m	Surface
1/19	8,316	100	Asphalt
15/33	4,513	75	Asphalt
8/26	3,151	960	Asphalt

Statistics (2020)
- Aircraft operations: 85
- Based aircraft: 13

Carbon County Regional Airport (IATA: PUC, ICAO: KPUC, FAA LID: PUC), is a publicly owned airport 3 miles east of downtown Price, in Carbon County, Utah.

== Airline and destination ==
=== Cargo ===
Airlines	Destinations
Alpine Air	Salt Lake City

== See also ==
- List of airports in Utah
