= Monticello Airport (Utah) =

- IATA: MXC; ICAO: none; FAA LID: U64

Summary
- Airport type: Public
- Owner: City of Monticello
- Serves: Monticello, Utah
- Elevation AMSL: 6,970 ft / 2,124 m
- Coordinates: 37°55′57″N 109°20′28″W

Map
- Location of airport in Utah

Runways
Direction	Length		Surface
Direction	ft	m	Surface
16/34	5,998	1,828	Asphalt

Statistics (2023)
- Aircraft operations (year ending 10/1/2023): 2,207
- Based aircraft: 5
- Source: Federal Aviation Administration

Monticello Airport (IATA: MXC, FAA LID: U64) is a city-owned, public-use airport located three nautical miles (6 km) north of the central business district of Monticello, a city in San Juan County, Utah, United States. The airport's current site on the east side of U.S. Route 191 opened in 2011, replacing the former Monticello Airport (FAA: U43) which was located on the west side of the highway.

== Facilities and aircraft ==
Monticello Airport covers an area of 264 acres (107 ha) at an elevation of 6,970 feet (2,124 m) above mean sea level. It has one runway designated 16/34 with an asphalt surface measuring 5,998 by 75 feet (1,828 x 23 m).

For the 12-month period ending October 1, 2023, the airport had 2,207 aircraft operations, an average of 42 per week: 98% general aviation and 2% air taxi. At that time there were 5 aircraft based at this airport: all single-engine.

== Former airport ==
The former **Monticello Airport** ((FAA LID: U43)) was located at 37°56′14″N 109°20′47″W. It covered an area of 75 acres (30 ha) at an elevation of 6,998 feet (2,133 m) above mean sea level. The airport had one runway, designated 16/34, with an asphalt surface measuring 4,817 by 75 feet (1,468 × 23 m).

According to the FAA's National Plan of Integrated Airport Systems for 2009–2013, the facility was categorized as a general aviation airport.

The airport was served by several commuter airlines from the 1970s through the 1990s, including Sun Valley Key Commuter, Transwestern Airlines, and Alpine Air. These carriers operated direct flights to Moab and Salt Lake City.

== See also ==
- List of airports in Utah
