= KNB =

KNB can refer to

- KNB EFX Group, an American special effects company
- Keolis Northern Beaches, Australian bus operator
- Kanab Municipal Airport, an airport near Kanab, Utah
- Kitanihon Broadcasting, a Japanese media company
- Kean Nakamura-Berta, a Japanese and Slovak racing driver
- National Security Committee of the Republic of Kazakhstan, also referred to as the NSC or KNB
- Kalaallit Nunaanni Brugseni, a Greenlandic supermarket chain better known as Brugseni
