= Morgan County Airport (Utah) =

- IATA: none; ICAO: none; FAA LID: 42U

Summary
- Airport type: Public
- Owner: Morgan County
- Serves: Morgan County, Utah
- Location: Morgan, Utah
- Elevation AMSL: 5,020 ft / 1,530 m
- Coordinates: 41°08′56″N 111°45′59″W

Map
- Location of airport in Utah

Runways
Direction	Length		Surface
Direction	ft	m	Surface
3/21	3,904	1,190	Asphalt

Statistics (2023)
- Aircraft operations (year ending 9/19/2023): 9,272
- Based aircraft: 117
- Source: Federal Aviation Administration

Morgan County Airport (FAA LID: 42U) is a county-owned, public-use airport in Morgan County, Utah, United States. It is located eight nautical miles (9 mi, 15 km) northwest of the central business district of Morgan.

== Facilities and aircraft ==
Morgan County Airport covers an area of 28 acres (11 ha) at an elevation of 5,020 feet (1,530 m) above mean sea level. It has one runway designated 3/21 with an asphalt surface measuring 3,904 by 50 feet (1,190 x 15 m).

For the 12-month period ending September 19, 2023, the airport had 9,272 aircraft operations, an average of 25 per day: 93% general aviation, 6% military, and <1% air taxi. At that time there were 117 aircraft based at this airport: 85 single-engine, 22 glider, 2 multi-engine, 5 ultralight, and 3 helicopter.

== See also ==
- List of airports in Utah
