= Beaver Municipal Airport (Utah) =

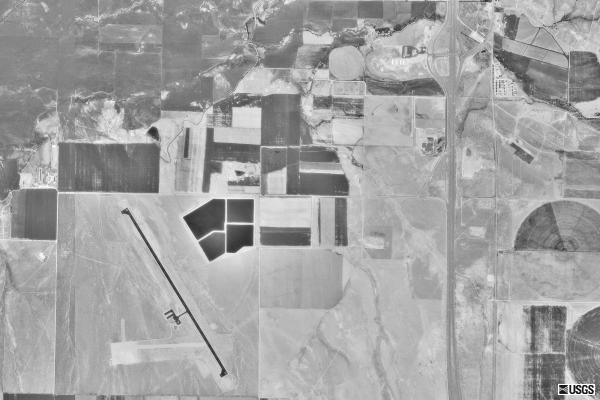
- Asphalt (dark black) runway and dirt (white) runway on left. USGS image (1999).
- IATA: none; ICAO: none; FAA LID: U52

Summary
- Airport type: Public
- Owner: Beaver City
- Serves: Beaver, Utah
- Elevation AMSL: 5,863 ft (1,787 m)
- Coordinates: 38°13′50″N 112°40′32″W
- Website: BeaverUtah.net/...

Map
- Location of airport in Utah

Runways
Direction	Length		Surface
Direction	ft	m	Surface
13/31	4,984	1,519	Asphalt
7/25	2,150	655	Dirt

Statistics (2010)
- Aircraft operations: 1,958
- Based aircraft: 9
- Source: Federal Aviation Administration

Beaver Municipal Airport (FAA LID: U52) is a public use airport in Beaver County, Utah, United States. It is owned by the city of Beaver and located four nautical miles (5 mi, 7 km) southwest of its central business district. This airport is included in the National Plan of Integrated Airport Systems for 2011–2015, which categorized it as a general aviation facility.

== History ==
The airport was opened in May 1944.

In 1992, the airport received federal funding to extend and rehabilitate their runway, as well as install a visual approach system. A fence, to keep both wildlife and unauthorized people out of the airport grounds, was funded in 2007.

== Facilities and aircraft ==
Beaver Municipal Airport covers an area of 841 acres (340 ha) at an elevation of 5,863 feet (1,787 m) above mean sea level. It has two runways: 13/31 is 4,984 by 75 feet (1,519 x 23 m) with an asphalt surface and 7/25 is 2,150 by 50 feet (655 x 15 m) with a dirt surface.

For the 12-month period ending December 31, 2010, the airport had 1,958 aircraft operations, an average of 163 per month: 97% general aviation and 3% air taxi. At that time there were 9 aircraft based at this airport: 56% single-engine and 44% ultralight.

Instrument approach procedure (IAP): RNAV (GPS)-A

== See also ==
- List of airports in Utah
