= Salina-Gunnison Airport =

- IATA: SBO; ICAO: none; FAA LID: 44U

Summary
- Airport type: Public
- Owner: Cities of Salina & Gunnison
- Serves: Salina & Gunnison, Utah
- Location: Sevier County
- Elevation AMSL: 5,159 ft / 1,572 m
- Coordinates: 39°01′45″N 111°50′18″W
- Interactive map of Salina-Gunnison Airport

Runways
Direction	Length		Surface
Direction	ft	m	Surface
2/20	3,855	1,175	Asphalt

Statistics (2023)
- Aircraft operations (year ending 9/26/2023): 1,215
- Based aircraft: 11
- Source: Federal Aviation Administration

Salina-Gunnison Airport (IATA: SBO, FAA LID: 44U) is a public-use airport located five nautical miles (9 km) northeast of the central business district of Salina, a city in Sevier County, Utah, United States. It is owned by the cities of Salina and Gunnison.

== Facilities and aircraft ==
Salina-Gunnison Airport covers an area of 610 acres (250 ha) at an elevation of 5,159 feet (1,572 m) above mean sea level. It has one asphalt paved runway designated 2/20 which measures 3,855 by 60 feet (1,175 x 18 m).

For the 12-month period ending September 26, 2023, the airport had 1,215 aircraft operations: 99% general aviation, and <1% air taxi. At that time, there were 11 aircraft based at the airport, all single-engine.

== See also ==
- List of airports in Utah
