= Hurricane Municipal Airport =

Airport in Utah

- IATA: none; ICAO: none; FAA LID: 1L8

Summary
- Airport type: Public
- Owner: City of Hurricane
- Serves: Hurricane, Utah
- Elevation AMSL: 3,351 ft (1,021 m)
- Coordinates: 37°08′20″N 113°19′20″W
- Website: cityofhurricane.com
- Interactive map of Hurricane Municipal Airport

Runways
Direction	Length		Surface
Direction	ft	m	Surface
01/19	3,282	1,000	Asphalt

Statistics (2023)
- Aircraft operations (year ending 9/25/2023): 12,010
- Based aircraft: 43
- Source: Federal Aviation Administration

Hurricane Municipal Airport (FAA LID: 1L8), also known as General Dick Stout Field, is a public airport three miles south of Hurricane, in Washington County, Utah. It is owned by the City of Hurricane. The FAA's National Plan of Integrated Airport Systems for 2021–2025 called it a general aviation airport.

== Facilities and aircraft ==
Hurricane Municipal Airport is at an elevation of 3,351 feet (1,021 m) above mean sea level. Its one runway, 01/19 is 3,282 by 60 feet (1,000 x 18 m) asphalt. The 2020 airport master plan shows a future 718 foot extension of the runway to 4,000 by 60 feet.

== See also ==
- List of airports in Utah
