= Cedar City Regional Airport =

Airport in Utah

- IATA: CDC; ICAO: KCDC; FAA LID: CDC

Summary
- Airport type: Public
- Owner: Cedar City Corporation
- Serves: Cedar City, Utah
- Elevation AMSL: 5,622 ft (1,714 m)
- Coordinates: 37°42′03″N 113°05′56″W
- Website: CedarCity.org/...

Map
- Location of airport in Utah CDC (the United States)

Runways
Direction	Length		Surface
Direction	ft	m	Surface
2/20	8,650	2,637	Asphalt
8/26	4,822	1,470	Asphalt

Statistics (2022)
- Aircraft operations: 119,544
- Based aircraft: 106
- Source: Federal Aviation Administration

Cedar City Regional Airport (IATA: CDC, ICAO: KCDC, FAA LID: CDC) is two miles northwest of Cedar City, in Iron County, Utah. It is owned by the Cedar City Corporation. Airline flights are subsidized by the Essential Air Service program.

Federal Aviation Administration records say the airport had 7,776 passenger boardings (enplanements) in calendar year 2008, 5,486 in 2009 and 5,997 in 2010. The National Plan of Integrated Airport Systems for 2011–2015 categorized it as a non-primary commercial service airport (between 2,500 and 10,000 enplanements per year).

== History ==
SkyWest Airlines provided Essential Air Service (EAS) from 1972 until 2005 when Air Midwest, a subsidiary of Mesa Airlines was awarded the contract. Mayor Gerald Sherratt was quoted as saying “This is not good” when told the news about Mesa being awarded the contract. Citizens wrote to senator Orrin Hatch which prompted him in 2007 to write a letter to the United States Department of Transportation to urge them to select a new carrier to provide air service to Cedar City. Late in 2007, Mesa filed to discontinue service to Cedar City, and a new contract was awarded to SkyWest.

Western Airlines flew to Cedar City in the 1940s; Bonanza Air Lines DC-3s replaced them in 1957–58. Bonanza Fairchild F-27s flew Phoenix–Prescott–Grand Canyon Airport–Page–Cedar City–Salt Lake City. Successor Air West/Hughes Airwest continued with F-27s, later flying between Cedar City and Las Vegas. Hughes Airwest dropped Cedar City in 1977.

SkyWest served Cedar City with 19-seat Fairchild Swearingen Metroliners, then 30-seat Embraer EMB-120 Brasilias. SkyWest now flies 76 seat Canadair regional jets as Delta Connection nonstop to Salt Lake City.

== Facilities ==
The airport covers 1,040 acres (421 ha) at an elevation of 5,622 feet (1,714 m). It has two asphalt runways: 2/20 is 8,650 by 150 feet (2,637 x 46 m) and 8/26 is 4,822 by 60 feet (1,470 x 18 m).

In the year ending December 31, 2022 the airport had 119,544 aircraft operations, average 327 per day: 99% general aviation, 1% air taxi, <1% airline, and <1% military. 106 aircraft were then based at the airport: 62 single-engine, 3 multi-engine, 7 jet, and 34 helicopter. By year ending December 31, 2020, aircraft operations grew to 119,551. By comparison aircraft operations for year ending December 31, 2011, was 30,065.

== Airlines and destinations ==
Airlines	Destinations
Delta Connection	Salt Lake City

Destinations map
Destinations from Cedar City Regional Airport

Top domestic destinations: (March 2021 - February 2022)
Rank	Airport	Passengers	Airline
1	Salt Lake City International (SLC)	12,000	Delta Connection

Cargo Destinations:

Airlines	Destinations
Alpine Air Express	Salt Lake City

== Business ==
SyberJet Aircraft, the manufacturer of the SJ30i and SJ30x business jet, operates out of the airport.

== See also ==
- List of airports in Utah

== Other sources ==
- Essential Air Service documents (Docket OST-2003-16395) from the U.S. Department of Transportation:
  - Order 2003-12-9 (December 8, 2003): reselecting SkyWest Airlines, Inc. d/b/a Delta Connection, to provide essential air service at Cedar City, Utah, at an annual subsidy rate of $770,285, for two years beginning January 1, 2004, through December 31, 2005.
  - Order 2006-1-19 (January 25, 2006): selecting Mesa Air Group, Inc., d/b/a Air Midwest, to provide essential air service (EAS) with 19-passenger Raytheon/Beechcraft B-1900D aircraft at Cedar City, Utah, for two years. The annual subsidy rate will be set at $897,535. We are also directing SkyWest Airlines, Inc., to show cause why we should not set the subsidy rate of $1,068,607 on an annual basis, for its provision of service from January 1, 2006, until Air Midwest inaugurates essential air service at Cedar City.
  - Order 2007-10-7 (October 4, 2007): selecting SkyWest Airlines, and Great Lakes Aviation, Ltd. to provide subsidized essential air service (EAS) at the above communities for the two-year period beginning when the carriers inaugurate full EAS. Specifically, we select SkyWest at Cedar City for the annual subsidy of $1,242,256 and Great Lakes at Merced, Visalia, Ely, Moab and Vernal for a combined annual subsidy of $5,670,244.
  - Order 2009-11-7 (November 5, 2009): re-selected SkyWest Airlines to provide essential air service at Cedar City, Utah, at an annual subsidy rate of $1,477,125 for the two-year period from January 1, 2010, through December 31, 2011. Such subsidy is calculated and distributed on a fiscal year basis, subject to the availability of appropriated funds.
  - Order 2011-9-10 (September 15, 2011): re-selecting SkyWest Airlines, operating as Delta Connection, to provide essential air service (EAS) at Cedar City, Utah, using 50-seat Canadair Regional Jet 200 aircraft for a two-year period beginning January 1, 2012, through December 31, 2013, for an annual subsidy of $2,273,395.
  - Order 2012-3-11 (March 20, 2012): approving the request of SkyWest Airlines, operating as Delta Connection to temporarily delay upgrading aircraft at Cedar City, Utah, to 50-passenger Canadair Jet 200 (CRJ200) aircraft from 30-passenger Embraer Brasilia (EMB120) aircraft, effective January 1, 2012, until further notice, and adjusting their annual subsidy to $1,859,403.
