= Duchesne Municipal Airport =

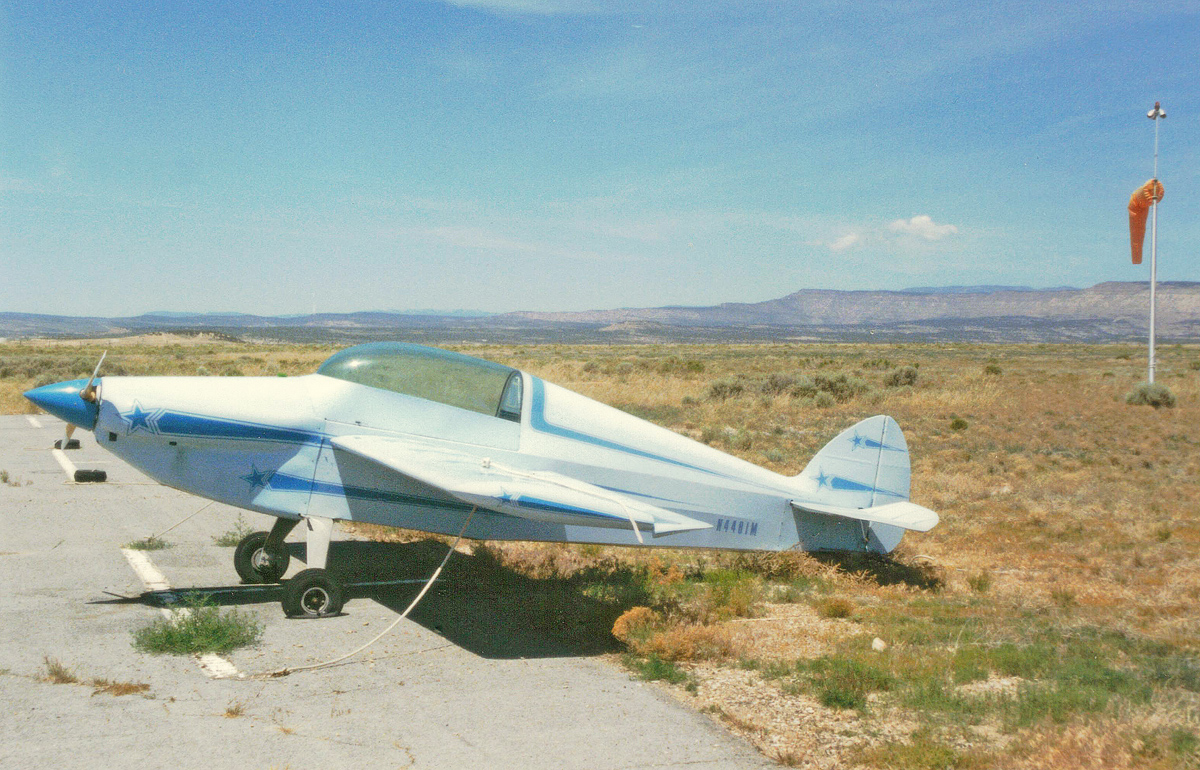
- Monnett Sonerai light aircraft at Duchesne Airport
- IATA: none; ICAO: none; FAA LID: U69

Summary
- Airport type: Public
- Owner/Operator: City of Duchesne
- Location: Duchsne, Utah
- Elevation AMSL: 5,831 ft (1,777 m)
- Coordinates: 40°11′30.85″N 110°22′51.56″W
- Interactive map of Duchesne Municipal Airport

Runways
Direction	Length		Surface
Direction	ft	m	Surface
8/26	3,091	942	Dirt
17/35	5,800	1,768	Asphalt

Statistics (2012)
- Aircraft operations (year ending 1/2/2012): 1548
- Sources: FAA

Duchesne Municipal Airport (FAA LID: U69) is a dual-runway airport located in Duchesne, Utah. It was opened in May 1945 and is operated by the City of Duchesne.

== Operations ==
Most aircraft movements at the airport are carried out by privately owned light aircraft, including those based and those transiting on business or pleasure flights.

== See also ==
- List of airports in Utah
