= Salmon Air =

Commuter airline based in Salmon, Idaho

IATA	ICAO	Call sign
S6	MBI	-
- Founded: 1968; 58 years ago
- Fleet size: 4
- Destinations: 3 Scheduled
- Parent company: Mountain Bird, Inc.
- Headquarters: Salmon, Idaho, U.S.
- Website: http://www.mccallaviation.com/

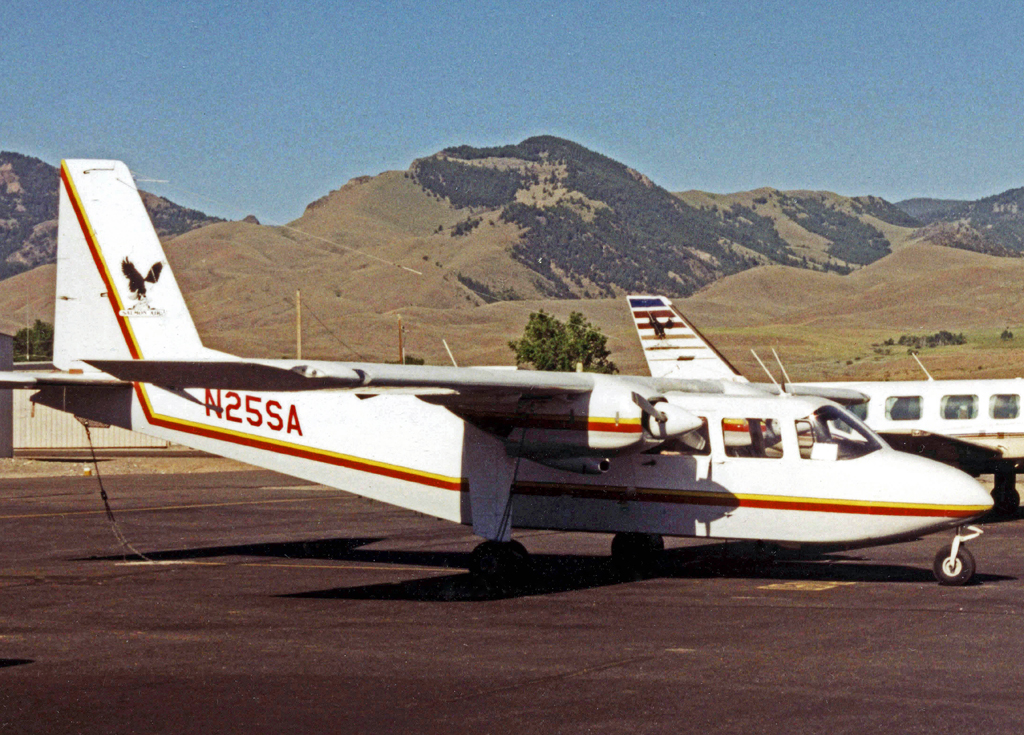
Britten-Norman Islander of Salmon Air at Salmon Idaho in 2000

Salmon Air was a commuter airline based in Salmon, Idaho, United States. Originally established in 1968 as Salmon Air Taxi, the company went bankrupt in the early '80s and was reorganized under new ownership, DBA Salmon Air Taxi, and eventually, DBA Salmon Air.

== History ==
Salmon Air's main base was in Salmon, Idaho, but the company also operated regularly out of the Boise Airport (BOI) as well as McCall and Stanley, Idaho. The name "Salmon Air" was sold to McCall Aviation in 2009. The former owners of the Salmon Air name kept the operating certificate, and went back into operation under that certificate as Gem Air in 2014. The Salmon Air name is still owned by McCall Aviation, who continues to operate during the summer out of Salmon, Idaho, but bases no aircraft on Salmon's Lemhi County Airport. Primarily a back country charter provider, McCall Aviation/Salmon Air provides air charter service into and around the Frank Church River of No Return Wilderness, as well as many other remote destination in Idaho for hikers, backpackers, rafters, hunters, etc.

== Destinations ==
Salmon Air operates passenger flights to the following destinations:

=== Idaho ===
- Salmon / Lemhi County Airport (flights to Boise & McCall)
- McCall / McCall Municipal Airport (flights to Boise & Salmon)
- Boise / Boise Airport (flights to McCall & Salmon)

=== Utah ===
Under previous owners, Salmon Air offered commuter flights between Salt Lake City and Vernal and Moab, Utah. That service is no longer offered.

== Fleet ==
Salmon Air, now under McCall Aviation, currently operates 1 Daher Kodiak (formerly known as Quest Kodiak).

=== Past Fleet ===
- Cessna 208 (cargo)

== Accidents and incidents ==
- On December 6, 2004, Flight 1860, a Cessna 208, was on a scheduled cargo flight for the United States Postal Service from Salt Lake City to Sun Valley when it crashed about 7 miles (11 km) south of Bellevue. Both crew members died.

== See also ==
- List of defunct airlines of the United States
