= Fillmore Municipal Airport =

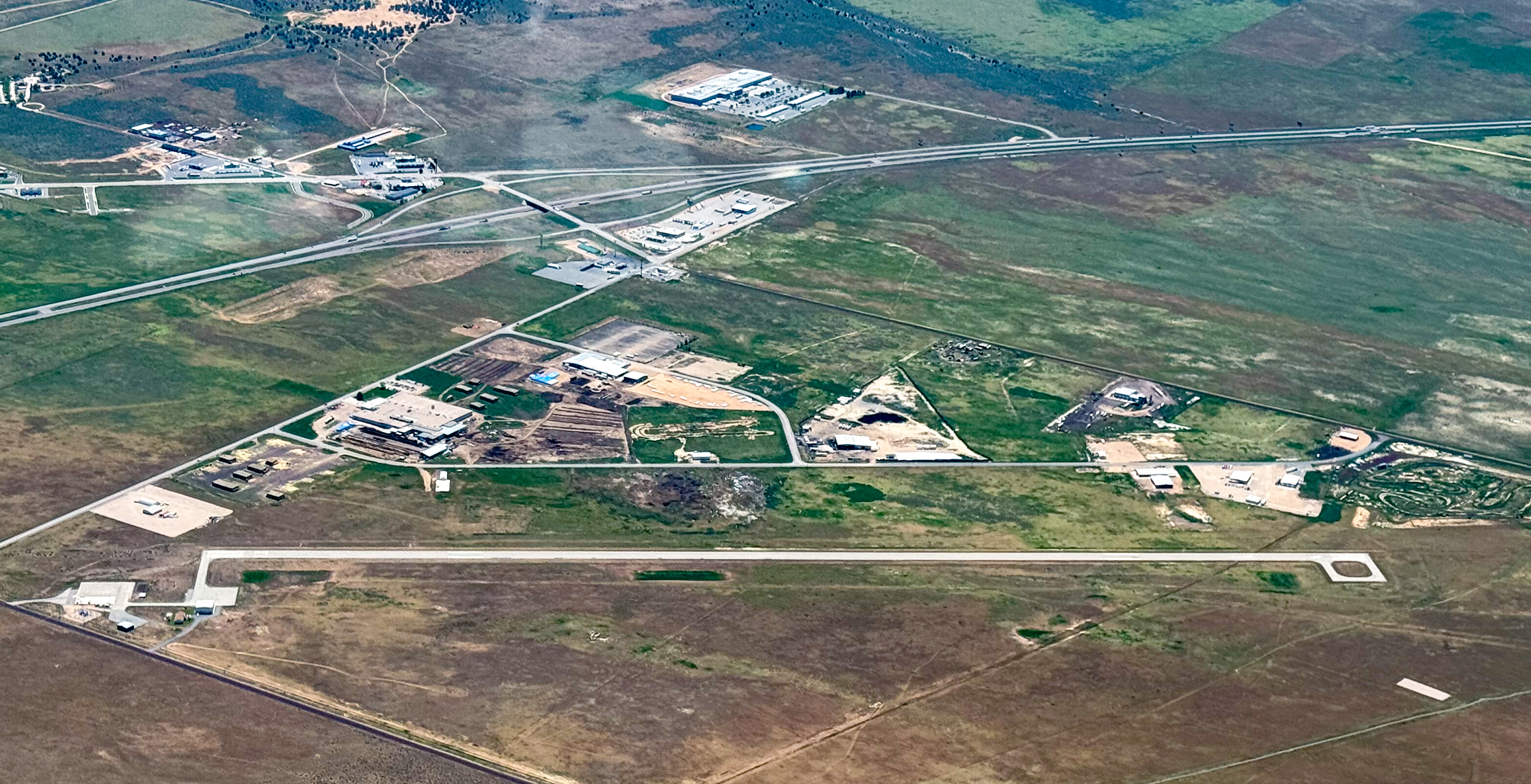
- IATA: FIL; ICAO: KFOM; FAA LID: FOM

Summary
- Airport type: Public
- Owner: City of Fillmore
- Serves: Fillmore, Utah
- Elevation AMSL: 4,985 ft (1,519 m)
- Coordinates: 38°57′29″N 112°21′47″W

Map
- Location within Utah

Runways
Direction	Length		Surface
Direction	ft	m	Surface
4/22	5,040	1,536	Asphalt

Statistics (2023)
- Aircraft operations (year ending 9/22/2023): 1,683
- Source: Federal Aviation Administration

Fillmore Municipal Airport (IATA: FIL, ICAO: KFOM, FAA LID: FOM) is a city-owned public-use airport located two nautical miles (4 km) west of the central business district of Fillmore, a city in Millard County, Utah, United States.

Although most U.S. airports use the same three-letter location identifier for the FAA and IATA, this airport is assigned FOM by the FAA and FIL by IATA (which assigned FOM to Foumban Airport in Foumban, Cameroon).

== Facilities and aircraft ==
Fillmore Municipal Airport covers an area of 241 acres (98 ha) at an elevation of 4,985 feet (1,519 m) above mean sea level. It has one asphalt paved runway designated 4/22 which measures 5,040 by 75 feet (1,536 x 23 m).

For the 12-month period ending September 22, 2023, the airport had 1,683 aircraft operations, an average of 32 per week: 98% general aviation and 2% air taxi.

== See also ==
- List of airports in Utah
