= Small nucleolar RNA SNORA64/SNORA10 family =

Homologous members of the H/ACA class of small nucleolar RNA

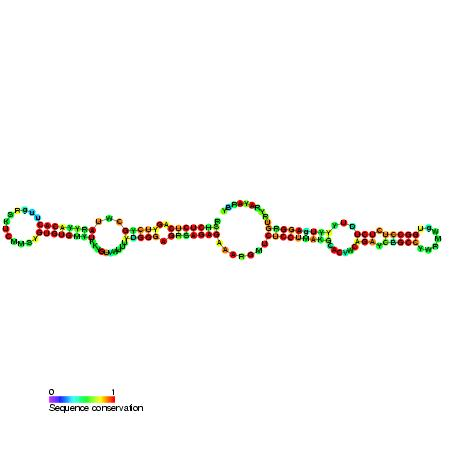
- Predicted secondary structure and sequence conservation of SNORA64

Identifiers
- Symbol: SNORA64
- Alt. Symbols: U64
- Rfam: RF00264

Other data
- RNA type: Gene; snRNA; snoRNA; HACA-box
- Domain: Eukaryota
- GO: GO:0006396 GO:0005730
- SO: SO:0000594
- PDB structures: PDBe

In molecular biology, small nucleolar RNA SNORA10 and small nuclear RNA SNORA64 are homologous members of the H/ACA class of small nucleolar RNA (snoRNA). This family of ncRNAs involved in the maturation of ribosomal RNA. snoRNA in this family act as guides in the modification of uridines to pseudouridines. This family includes the human snoRNAs U64 and ACA10 and mouse MBI-29.
