= Small nucleolar RNA SNORD34 =

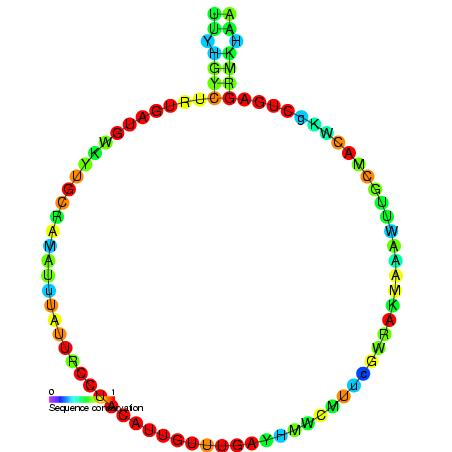
- Predicted secondary structure and sequence conservation of SNORD34

Identifiers
- Symbol: SNORD34
- Alt. Symbols: U34
- Rfam: RF00147

Other data
- RNA type: Gene; snRNA; snoRNA; CD-box
- Domain: Eukaryota
- GO: GO:0006396 GO:0005730
- SO: SO:0000593
- PDB structures: PDBe

In molecular biology, snoRNA U34 (also known as SNORD34) is a non-coding RNA (ncRNA) molecule which functions in the modification of other small nuclear RNAs (snRNAs). This type of modifying RNA is usually located in the nucleolus of the eukaryotic cell which is a major site of snRNA biogenesis. It is known as a small nucleolar RNA (snoRNA) and also often referred to as a guide RNA.

snoRNA U34 belongs to the C/D box class of snoRNAs which contain the conserved sequence motifs known as the C box (UGAUGA) and the D box (CUGA). Most of the members of the box C/D family function in directing site-specific 2'-O-methylation of substrate RNAs.

snoRNA U34 was initially characterised by a computational screen and in the human genome is encoded within intron 5 of the gene for ribosomal protein L13a. U34 is predicted to guide site-specific 2'-O-methylation of 25S rRNAs. Unusually for a snoRNA although the selection of the target nucleotide requires the antisense element and the conserved box D or D' of the snoRNA, in the case of U34 snoRNP the methyltransferase activity is thought to reside in one of the protein components. U34 snoRNA has homologues in mouse, Arabidopsis (annotated as snoR4) and in several copies in rice (alternatively named snoZ181).
