= Green River Municipal Airport =

Small airport in Utah

- IATA: RVR; ICAO: none; FAA LID: U34

Summary
- Airport type: Public
- Owner: Green River City Corp.
- Serves: Green River, Utah
- Elevation AMSL: 4,234 ft (1,291 m)
- Coordinates: 38°57′41″N 110°13′39″W
- Interactive map of Green River Municipal Airport

Runways
Direction	Length		Surface
Direction	ft	m	Surface
13/31	5,600	1,707	Asphalt

Statistics (2023)
- Aircraft operations (year ending 9/29/2023): 2,003
- Source: Federal Aviation Administration

Green River Municipal Airport (IATA: RVR, FAA LID: U34) is a public airport five miles southwest of Green River, in Emery County, Utah. It is owned by the Green River City Corp. The FAA's National Plan of Integrated Airport Systems for 2009–2013 called it a general aviation airport.

== Facilities and aircraft ==
Green River Municipal Airport covers 517 acres (209 ha) at an elevation of 4,234 feet (1,291 m) above mean sea level. Its one runway, 13/31, is 5,600 by 75 feet (1,707 x 23 m) asphalt.

In the year ending September 29, 2023, the airport had 2,003 aircraft operations: 70% general aviation and 30% air taxi.

== See also ==
- List of airports in Utah
