= Brigham City Airport =

- IATA: BMC; ICAO: KBMC; FAA LID: BMC

Summary
- Airport type: Public
- Owner: Brigham City
- Serves: Brigham City, Utah
- Elevation AMSL: 4,230 ft (1,290 m)
- Coordinates: 41°33′09″N 112°03′44″W
- Interactive map of Brigham City Airport

Runways
Direction	Length		Surface
Direction	ft	m	Surface
17/35	8,900	2,713	Asphalt

Statistics (2023)
- Aircraft operations: 19,800
- Based aircraft: 67
- Source: Federal Aviation Administration

Brigham City Airport (IATA: BMC, ICAO: KBMC, FAA LID: BMC) is a city-owned public-use airport located three nautical miles (6 km) northwest of the central business district of Brigham City, in Box Elder County, Utah, United States.

== Facilities and aircraft ==
Brigham City Airport covers an area of 254 acres (103 ha) at an elevation of 4,230 feet (1,289 m) above mean sea level. It has one asphalt paved runway designated 17/35 which measures 8,900 feet by 100 feet (2,713 x 30 m).

For the 12-month period ending September 20, 2023, the airport had 19,800 aircraft operations, an average of 54 per day: 98% general aviation and 2% air taxi. At that time there were 67 aircraft based at this airport: 64 single-engine, 2 multi-engine and 1 helicopter.

== Recent news ==
The Brigham City airport is reported to have received over $14 million in 2005 and 2006 in taxes and fees collected from airline passengers, despite the fact that there is no commercial passenger traffic serving the Brigham City airport. This amount is several times more than received by any other airport in the state.

== See also ==
- List of airports in Utah
