= Utah World War II Army Airfields =

Utah World War II Army Airfields
- Part of World War II
- Map Of Utah World War II Army Airfields

Site information
- Type: Army Airfields

Site history
- Built: 1940-1944
- In use: 1940--present

During World War II, the United States Army Air Forces (USAAF) established numerous airfields in Utah for training pilots and aircrews of USAAF fighters and bombers.

Most of these airfields were under the command of Second Air Force or the Army Air Forces Training Command (AAFTC). However the other USAAF support commands (including Air Technical Service Command (ATSC)) commanded airfields in support roles.

In addition to AAF airfields, Dugway Army Air Field was established at Dugway Proving Ground, which had been established by the Chemical Warfare Service to test chemical attacks and defences. It is now Michael Army Airfield.

Many of the airfields were converted into municipal airports, some were returned to agriculture and several were retained as United States Air Force installations and were front-line bases during the Cold War. Hundreds of the temporary buildings that were used survive today, and are being used for other purposes.

== Major Airfields ==
Air Technical Service Command

- Hill Field, Clearfield

Ogden Air Depot, 12 January 1939-3 January 1955
482nd Base Headquarters and Air Base Squadron, 2 January 1943-1 April 1944
4135th Army Air Force Base Unit, 1 April 1944-28 August 1948
Now Hill Air Force Base

Hinckley Field, Ogden
Sub-base of Hill AAF
Now: Ogden-Hinckley Airport (IATA: OGD, ICAO: KOGD, FAA LID: OGD)

Army Air Forces Training Command

- Kearns Army Air Base

Army Air Forces Replacement Training Center/Army Air Forces Basic Training Center No.5, 1 May 1942-30 September 1943
Army Air Forces Overseas Replacement Depot, 20 July 1942-30 April 1944
Assigned to Second Air Force, 1 October 1943
363rd Base Headquarters and Air Base Squadron, 1 October 1943-24 March 1944
Operational airfield of Kearns Army Air Base (AAFTC)
Now South Valley Regional Airport (FAA LID: U42)

- Salt Lake City AAB/APT, Salt Lake City, Utah

Joint Use USAAF/Civil Airport as freight terminal
Now: Salt Lake City International Airport (IATA: SLC, ICAO: KSLC, FAA LID: SLC)

- Wendover Field, Wendover, Utah

Was: Wendover Air Force Base (1947-1965)
Now: Wendover Airport (IATA: ENV, ICAO: KENV, FAA LID: ENV)

Auxiliary fields: (Delle AF Aux 40°45′45″N 112°47′14″W, Knolls CAA 40°44′07″N 113°13′50″W, Low Flight Strip)

Note: Delle was reported to have had an "asterisk" type layout, runways under 2000' in length. Aux to Wendover AAF and to Salt Lake City AAB. Later taken over by a private person and some remains can be seen. Two of the runways were paved by the new owner and can be seen still. It has been reported that occasionally aircraft have been seen there, assume private and uncharted and unlisted. No other data on this field exists. Status assumed closed.
Note: Knolls was a 3000x3000' all way field; clay. used by Wendover as an Aux for light aircraft (e.g.L4). Some indications that a few P-47 ops took place as well
