= Gem Air =

Airline of the United States

IATA	ICAO	Call sign
S6	MBI	-
- Founded: 1968; 58 years ago (as Salmon Air)
- AOC #: GAJA077E
- Fleet size: 12
- Destinations: 4
- Parent company: Gem Air, LLC
- Headquarters: Salmon, Idaho, U.S.
- Key people: Dan Schroeder - Co-owner; JoAnn Wolters - Co-owner; David Schroeder - Dir. of Airline Development
- Website: www.gemairflights.com

Gem Air is a commuter airline based in Salmon, Idaho, United States. The company has been operating in Idaho since 1982 (though it operated under the name Salmon Air until 2009, when they sold the name to McCall Aviation). Between 2009 and 2014, the company offered limited charter and contract services. In 2014, Gem Air again started offering a full fleet of charter, scheduled, and cargo services. Gem Air mainly serves the mountain west: Idaho, Montana, Wyoming, Utah, Washington, and Oregon.

== Destinations ==
Gem Air provides on-demand flights to the Idaho backcountry, including flights to the Frank Church River of No Return Wilderness and Selway-Bitterroot wilderness. Gem Air also provides on-demand service to support outfitted rafting trips in the summer, and frequently carries passengers between Boise, Salmon, Stanley, and McCall. Scheduled service twice a week is offered September–May between Boise and Salmon. Gem Air offers charter service to the entire mountain west, operating frequently in and out of Salt Lake City, UT, Sun Valley, ID, Jackson Hole, WY, Bozeman, MT, and Bend, OR.

=== Passenger ===
- Boise - Boise Airport
- McCall - McCall Municipal Airport
- Salmon - Lemhi County Airport
- Stanley - Stanley Airport
- Frank Church River of No Return Wilderness airstrips
- Selway-Bitterroot Wilderness airstrips

=== Cargo ===
Idaho

- Boise, Idaho - Boise Airport
- Challis - Challis Airport
- Idaho Falls - Idaho Falls Regional Airport
- Salmon - Lemhi County Airport
- Twin Falls, Idaho - Magic Valley Regional Airport
- Jerome, Idaho - Jerome County Airport
- Grangeville, Idaho - Idaho County Airport
- Lewiston, Idaho - Lewiston-Nez Perce County Airport

Utah

- Salt Lake City - Salt Lake City International Airport
- Moab, Utah - Canyonlands Regional Airport

Oregon

- Burns - Burns Municipal Airport

Washington

- Spokane, Washington - Spokane International Airport

== Fleet ==
Gem Air's fleet includes the following aircraft:

Gem Air fleet
Aircraft	Total	Seats	Notes
Cessna 208 Caravan	4	9	1 cargo only
Britten-Norman Islander	4	9	
Cessna 206	1	5	
Cessna 172	1	4	
Piper PA-34 Seneca	1	5	
Total	11		

== Accidents and incidents ==
- On 13 April 2022, a Cessna 208 Caravan registration N928JP, operating a cargo flight, crashed while on approach to the Burley Municipal Airport. The only occupant on board died.
