= German submarine U-34 =

U-34 may refer to one of the following German submarines:

- SM U-34, was a Type U 31 submarine launched in 1914 and that served in the First World War; disappeared after 18 October 1918
  - During the First World War, Germany also had these submarines with similar names:
    - SM UB-34, a Type UB II submarine launched in 1915 and surrendered on 26 November 1918
    - SM UC-34, a Type UC II submarine launched in 1916 and scuttled on 30 October 1918
- German submarine U-34 (1936), a Type VIIA submarine that served in the Second World War until sunk on 5 August 1943
- German submarine U-34 (S184), a Type 212 submarine of the Bundesmarine that was launched in 2006 and in active service
