= Skypark Airport =

- IATA: BTF; ICAO: KBTF; FAA LID: BTF

Summary
- Airport type: Public
- Owner: Skypark Airport Assoc., LLC
- Serves: Bountiful, Utah
- Elevation AMSL: 4,237 ft / 1,291 m
- Coordinates: 40°52′10″N 111°55′38″W
- Interactive map of Skypark Airport

Runways
Direction	Length		Surface
Direction	ft	m	Surface
17/35	4,634	1,412	Asphalt

Statistics (2023)
- Aircraft operations (year ending 9/20/23): 85,468
- Based aircraft: 256
- Source: Federal Aviation Administration

Skypark Airport (IATA: BTF, ICAO: KBTF, FAA LID: BTF) is a public use airport located three nautical miles (6 km) southwest of the central business district of Bountiful, a city in Davis County, Utah, United States. It is privately owned by Skypark Airport Assoc., LLC.

== Facilities and aircraft ==
Skypark Airport covers an area of 35 acres (14 ha) at an elevation of 4,237 feet (1,291 m) above mean sea level. It has one asphalt paved runway designated 17/35 which measures 4,634 by 70 feet (1,412 x 21 m).

For the 12-month period ending September 20, 2023, the airport had 85,468 aircraft operations, an average of 234 per day: 100% general aviation and <1% air taxi. At that time there were 256 aircraft based at this airport: 225 single-engine, 15 multi-engine, 4 jet, and 12 helicopter.

== See also ==
- List of airports in Utah
