= Panguitch Municipal Airport =

- IATA: PNU; ICAO: none; FAA LID: U55

Summary
- Airport type: Public
- Owner: Panguitch City Corp.
- Serves: Panguitch, Utah
- Elevation AMSL: 6,763 ft / 2,061 m
- Coordinates: 37°50′43″N 112°23′31″W

Map
- Location of airport in Utah

Runways
Direction	Length		Surface
Direction	ft	m	Surface
18/36	5,700	1,737	Asphalt

Statistics (2023)
- Aircraft operations (year ending 9/25/2023): 1,278
- Based aircraft: 12
- Source: Federal Aviation Administration

Panguitch Municipal Airport (IATA: PNU, FAA LID: U55) is a public use airport located three nautical miles (6 km) northeast of the central business district of Panguitch, a city in Garfield County, Utah, United States. It is owned by the Panguitch City Corp. This airport is included in the National Plan of Integrated Airport Systems for 2011–2015, which categorized it as a general aviation facility.

== Facilities and aircraft ==
Panguitch Municipal Airport covers an area of 351 acres (142 ha) at an elevation of 6,763 feet (2,061 m) above mean sea level. It has one runway designated 18/36 with an asphalt surface measuring 5,700 by 75 feet (1,737 x 23 m).

For the 12-month period ending September 25, 2023, the airport had 1,278 aircraft operations, an average of 24 per week: 96% general aviation and 3% air taxi. At that time there were 12 aircraft based at this airport: all single-engine.

== See also ==
- List of airports in Utah
