= Jake Garn Airport =

- IATA: none; ICAO: none; FAA LID: 17U

Summary
- Airport type: Public use
- Owner: Eagle Mountain Properties, LLC
- Serves: Eagle Mountain, Utah
- Elevation AMSL: 4,845 ft (1,477 m)
- Coordinates: 40°15′49″N 112°01′16″W

Map
- Location of airport in Utah

Runways
Direction	Length		Surface
Direction	ft	m	Surface
17/35	5,000	1,524	Asphalt/gravel

Statistics (2007)
- Aircraft operations: 82 per week
- Source: Federal Aviation Administration

Jake Garn Airport (FAA LID: 17U) was a privately owned public-use airport 3 nautical miles (6 km) southwest of the central business district of Eagle Mountain, a city in Utah County, Utah, United States. The airport opened in May 2000 and closed in 2018.

== Facilities and aircraft ==
Jake Garn Airport covered an area of 438 acres (177 ha) at an elevation of 4,845 feet (1,477 m) above mean sea level. It had one runway designated 17/35 with an asphalt and gravel surface measuring 5,000 by 50 feet (1,524 by 15 m).

In 2007 the airport had an average of 82 general aviation aircraft operations per week, of which 95% were local and 5% were transient.
