= German submarine U-55 =

U-55 may refer to one of the following German submarines:

- SM U-55, a Type U 51 submarine launched in 1916 and that served in the First World War until surrendered 26 November 1918; in service as Japanese submarine O-3, 1920–21; dismantled at Sasebo, March–June 1921; briefly recommissioned as Auxiliary Vessel No. 2538, 1923
  - During the First World War, Germany also had these submarines with similar names:
    - SM UB-55, a Type UB III submarine launched in 1917 and sunk on 23 April 1918
    - SM UC-55, a Type UC II submarine launched in 1916 and sunk on 29 September 1917
- German submarine U-55 (1939), a Type VIIB submarine that served in the Second World War until sunk 30 January 1940
