= Delta Municipal Airport =

- IATA: DTA; ICAO: KDTA; FAA LID: DTA

Summary
- Airport type: Public
- Owner: Delta City Corporation
- Serves: Delta, Utah
- Elevation AMSL: 4,760 ft (1,450 m)
- Coordinates: 39°22′50″N 112°30′28″W

Map
- Location within Utah

Runways
Direction	Length		Surface
Direction	ft	m	Surface
17/35	6,065	1,849	Asphalt

Statistics (2023)
- Aircraft operations (year ending 9/22/2023): 2,382
- Based aircraft: 8
- Source: Federal Aviation Administration

Delta Municipal Airport (IATA: DTA, ICAO: KDTA, FAA LID: DTA) is three miles (6 km) northeast of Delta, in Millard County, Utah. The National Plan of Integrated Airport Systems for 2011–2015 categorized it as a general aviation airport.

The airport opened in June 1943. The airport's runways were last resurfaced around 1989, and due to a lack of funding were risking shutdown by 1999, but as of 2026 the airport is open.

== Facilities ==
Delta Municipal Airport covers 896 acres (363 ha) at an elevation of 4,760 feet (1,451 m). Its single runway, 17/35, is 6,065 by 75 feet (1,849 x 23 m).

In the year ending September 22, 2023, the airport had 2,382 aircraft operations, average 46 per week: 96% general aviation and 4% air taxi. Eight aircraft were then based at this airport, all single-engine.

== See also ==
- List of airports in Utah
