= German submarine U-64 =

U-64 may refer to one of the following German submarines:

- SM U-64 (Germany), a Type U 63 submarine launched in 1916 and that served in the First World War until sunk on 17 June 1918
  - During the First World War, Germany also had these submarines with similar names:
    - SM UB-64, a Type UB III submarine launched in 1917 and surrendered on 21 November 1918; broken up at Fareham in 1921
    - SM UC-64, a Type UC II submarine launched in 1917 and sunk on 20 June 1918
- German submarine U-64 (1939), a Type IXB submarine that served in the Second World War until sunk on 13 April 1940
