= Michael Army Airfield =

Michael Army Airfield Dugway Army Airfield
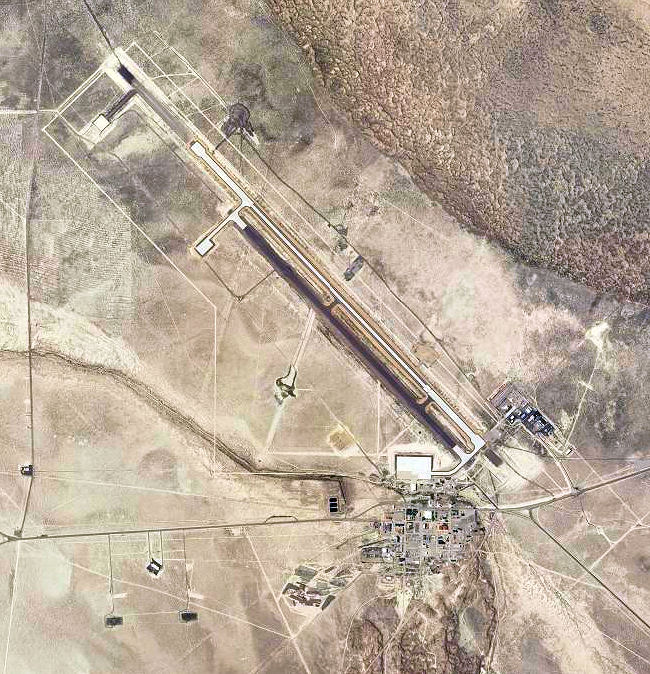
- 2006 USGS Photo
- IATA: DPG; ICAO: KDPG; FAA LID: DPG

Summary
- Airport type: Military: Army Airfield
- Operator: United States Army
- Serves: Dugway Proving Ground
- Location: Dugway Proving Ground; Tooele County, Utah; United States
- Built: 1951
- Elevation AMSL: 4,349 ft / 1,326 m
- Coordinates: 40°11′58″N 112°56′15″W

Map
- Location of Michael Army Airfield in Utah KDPG (the United States)

Runways
Direction	Length		Surface
Direction	ft	m	Surface
12/30	11,000	3,353	Asphalt
- Sources: Federal Aviation Administration

Michael Army Airfield (MAAF) (IATA: DPG, ICAO: KDPG, FAA LID: DPG) is a military airport located at the Dugway Proving Ground and owned by the United States Army. It is 9 miles (14 km) west of the proving grounds barracks at Dugway, Tooele County, Utah, United States.

== Overview ==
Michael Army Airfield is located in a secluded, distant location and the secretive nature of its missions are generally undisclosed by the Army. Built by the Army during World War II, as Dugway Army Airfield, the facility is located in the Dugway Proving Ground which is one of the Army's main facilities for developing defenses against biological and chemical attacks. Workers at Dugway test defense gear to make sure they can survive nuclear, biological and chemical attacks.

MAAF is located just south of Hill Air Force Base's massive Utah Test and Training Range, where F-35 Lightning II fighters from Hill train in air-to-air combat and the Air Force tests cruise missiles, and is used occasionally by the Air Force as an emergency landing field.

It has been called the "new Area 51" by some, with the Dugway Proving Ground serving as a buffer zone, as the Nevada Test Site served for Groom Lake.

== Projects ==
In the 1990s, MAAF was associated with the NASA X-38 Crew Return Vehicle (CRV) program, for the International Space Station. That program, however, was canceled in 2002 due to budget cuts.

One frequently rumored test project is the Lockheed Martin X-33. It is undetermined if MAAF will be used in association with the Boeing X-37 Advanced Technology Demonstrator, the military derivative of the X-38, a classified project which was transferred from NASA to the Defense Advanced Research Projects Agency on 13 September 2004.

In 2009, it was announced that Michael AAF will be used for the development and testing of Unmanned Aircraft Systems (UAS), which are sent overseas to provide soldiers with an aerial view - via video feed - of combat situations.

== Facilities ==
Michael AAF previously had a 13,125-foot (4,000 m) runway which was in poor condition. An FAA airport diagram effective January 2008 shows a 7,000 by 150-foot (46 m) runway (12/30) open parallel to the prior runway, but the diagram effective February 2009 shows a new 11,000 by 150-foot (46 m) runway is open in place of the original runway. As of 2013, 1,000 feet of each end of the runway is designated as an "overrun," leaving only 10,000 feet available for takeoffs and landings in each direction.

== See also ==
- Utah World War II Army Airfields
