= Kanab Municipal Airport =

Airport in Utah, United States

- IATA: KNB; ICAO: KKNB; FAA LID: KNB

Summary
- Airport type: Public
- Owner: City of Kanab
- Serves: Kanab, Utah
- Elevation AMSL: 4,868 ft (1,484 m)
- Coordinates: 37°00′40″N 112°31′52″W
- Interactive map of Kanab Municipal Airport

Runways
Direction	Length		Surface
Direction	ft	m	Surface
1/19	6,200	1,890	Asphalt

Statistics (2023)
- Aircraft operations (year ending 9/27/2023): 3,140
- Based aircraft: 21
- Source: Federal Aviation Administration

Kanab Municipal Airport (IATA: KNB, ICAO: KKNB, FAA LID: KNB) is in Kane County, Utah, United States, two miles south of the city of Kanab, which owns it. The FAA's National Plan of Integrated Airport Systems for 2009–2013 categorized as a general aviation facility.

== Facilities ==
The airport covers 167 acres (68 ha) at an elevation of 4,868 feet (1,484 m). Its one runway, 1/19, is 6,200 by 75 feet (1,890 x 23 m) asphalt.

In the year ending September 27, 2023, the airport had 3,140 aircraft operations, average 60 per week: 96% general aviation and 3% air taxi. 21 aircraft were then based at the airport: 18 single-engine, 2 multi-engine, and 1 helicopter.

== See also ==
- List of airports in Utah
