= Lemhi County Airport =

- IATA: SMN; ICAO: KSMN; FAA LID: SMN

Summary
- Airport type: Public
- Operator: Lemhi County
- Location: Salmon, Idaho
- Elevation AMSL: 4,043 ft / 1,232.3 m
- Coordinates: 45°07′26″N 113°52′53″W

Map
- Location in Idaho

Runways
Direction	Length		Surface
Direction	ft	m	Surface
17/35	5,510	1,679	Asphalt

Lemhi County Airport (IATA: SMN, ICAO: KSMN, FAA LID: SMN) is a public airport located four miles (6 km) south of the central business district (CBD) of Salmon, a city in Lemhi County, Idaho, USA. The airport covers 259 acres (105 ha) and has one runway.

== Airline and destination ==
Airlines	Destinations
Gem Air	Boise

== See also ==
- List of airports in Idaho
