= Lipid IVA 3-deoxy-D-manno-octulosonic acid transferase =

Class of enzymes

Identifiers
- EC no.: 2.4.99.12

Databases
- IntEnz: IntEnz view
- BRENDA: BRENDA entry
- ExPASy: NiceZyme view
- KEGG: KEGG entry
- MetaCyc: metabolic pathway
- PRIAM: profile
- PDB structures: RCSB PDB PDBe PDBsum
Search
- PMC: articles
- PubMed: articles
- NCBI: proteins

Lipid IVA 3-deoxy-D-manno-octulosonic acid transferase (EC 2.4.99.12, KDO transferase, waaA (gene), kdtA (gene), 3-deoxy-D-manno-oct-2-ulosonic acid transferase, 3-deoxy-manno-octulosonic acid transferase, lipid IVA KDO transferase) is an enzyme with systematic name CMP-3-deoxy-D-manno-oct-2-ulosonate:lipid IVA 3-deoxy-D-manno-oct-2-ulosonate transferase. This enzyme catalyses the following chemical reaction

lipid IVA + CMP-alpha-Kdo $\rightleftharpoons$ alpha-Kdo-(2->6)-lipid IVA + CMP

The bifunctional enzyme from Escherichia coli transfers two 3-deoxy-D-man no-oct-2-resonate residues to lipid IVA.

== See also ==
- EC 2.4.99.13, (KDO)-lipid IVA 3-deoxy-D-manno-octulosonic acid transferase
