= Transwestern Airlines =

1977–1983 airline in the United States

IATA	ICAO	Call sign
WZ	TRW	Trans West
- Founded: 1977; 49 years ago
- Ceased operations: December 31, 1983; 42 years ago
- Hubs: Salt Lake City International Airport
- Destinations: Utah, Idaho, Wyoming, Colorado, New Mexico
- Headquarters: Logan, Utah
- Key people: George Bagley (President)

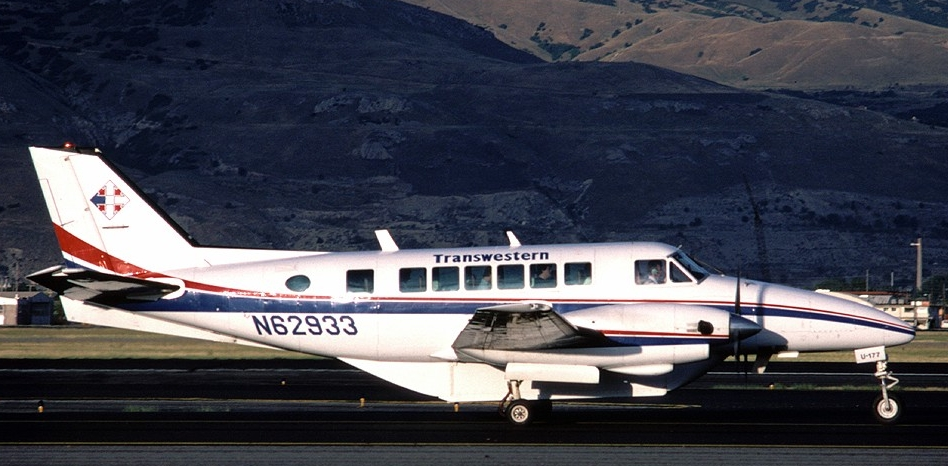
A Beech 99 at Salt Lake City

Transwestern Airlines was a regional airline based in Logan, Utah, its hub was at the Salt Lake City International Airport. Founded in 1976, the carrier began service on most of the routes abandoned by Sun Valley Key Airlines. For a period in 1978 and 1979 the airline went by the name of Transwestern Airlines of Utah. In 1983 Transwestern was acquired by Horizon Air.

== Destinations ==
From its hub at Salt Lake City, the carrier served the following destinations at various times during its existence:

- Colorado
  - Grand Junction
- Idaho
  - Boise
  - Idaho Falls
  - Pocatello
  - Sun Valley (Hailey)
  - Twin Falls
- Utah
  - Salt Lake City - Hub & airline headquarters
  - Blanding
  - Logan
  - Moab
  - Monticello
  - Price
  - Provo
  - Roosevelt
  - Vernal
- Wyoming
  - Jackson Hole
  - Rock Springs

Transwestern also flew from Denver to Santa Fe and Albuquerque, New Mexico in 1977 and 1978.

== Fleet ==
The Transwestern Airlines fleet consisted of the following aircraft:

- 7 Beechcraft 99 Airliner
- 1 Convair CV-580
- 1 Fairchild Swearingen Metro III
- Piper Chieftain

== Accidents ==
A non-fatality accident in Idaho occurred on its route on February 15, 1983, on a late morning flight from Boise to Sun Valley. On approach, the sub-contracted Sierra Pacific Airlines de Havilland Twin Otter pitched forward and an emergency landing was attempted on Highway 75, 1.7 miles (2.7 km) south of runway 31 of Friedman Memorial Airport in Hailey. Eight were injured, seven seriously. The control rod connection had separated; poor maintenance procedure using a non-standard bolt was cited as the cause.

== See also ==
- List of defunct airlines of the United States
