= Key Airlines =

American airline

| IATA | ICAO | Call sign |
|---|---|---|
| ZN | KEY | KEY AIR |
- Commenced operations: December 1968; 57 years ago
- Ceased operations: May 1993; 33 years ago
- Hubs: Friedman Memorial Airport; McCarran International Airport; Savannah/Hilton Head International Airport
- Headquarters: Initially Sun Valley, Idaho, United States
- Key people: Jim Wilkins (President - 1968-1969); Rolland Smith (President - 1969-1972)

Key Airlines was founded as Thunderbird Airlines in 1964 and then changed its name in 1969. The airline took over Sun Valley Airlines in 1972 and became known as Sun Valley Key Airlines for several years until reverting to the Key Airlines name. The airline began as a commuter and charter air carrier in the western United States flying turboprop and prop aircraft. In later years, Key Airlines operated a hub in Savannah, Georgia with scheduled passenger flights operated with mainline jet aircraft to international and domestic destinations.

== History ==
=== The early years: Commuter operations ===
The airline was originally based in Ogden, Utah, and began scheduled passenger service in 1964. The airline initially served eleven destinations in Idaho as well as Spokane, Washington with de Havilland Canada DHC-6 Twin Otter turboprop short takeoff and landing (STOL) aircraft. The commuter carrier lasted less than two months and halted operations on January 20, 1969, and its president resigned a week later. The airline later restructured and resumed service.

On February 20, 1972, Sun Valley Airlines suffered a fatal crash near Fairfield, which killed all five on board. Included was the company president, Rolland Smith, who was filling in as pilot of the mid-morning flight of the Beechcraft 65-B 80 Queen Air from Hailey to Boise. The left wing broke off due to a fire in the wheelwell. The fire was attributed to engine maintenance procedures, but the wing separation was due to inadequate fire protection in the design.

That summer, Sun Valley Airlines was acquired by Key Transportation and became "Sun Valley Key Airlines." In 1974, the airline was serving Boise and Sun Valley in Idaho as well as the following destinations in Utah via a small hub in Salt Lake City: Brigham City, Logan, Moab, Ogden, Price and Provo. It was sold to Johns-Mansville Corporation in 1975, and its name was changed back to "Key Airlines" in 1976. The airline's base was Salt Lake City, Utah (SLC) and by this time the aircraft of choice was the Convair 440, although other smaller turboprop and prop aircraft were used as well.

According to the February 1, 1976 edition of the North American Official Airline Guide (OAG), Sun Valley Key Airlines was operating scheduled passenger flights as a commuter air carrier from Salt Lake City (SLC) to a number of destinations in California, Colorado, Idaho, Nevada and Utah. These flights primarily served smaller communities in the region; however, service was also flown into larger cities such as Boise, ID (BOI), Grand Junction, CO (GJT), Oakland, CA (OAK) and Reno, NV (RNO). The primary aircraft types used for these flights were small Piper Cherokee and Piper Navajo prop airplanes although larger de Havilland Canada DHC-6 Twin Otter and Convair 440 aircraft were also being flown at this time between Salt Lake City and Sun Valley, ID (SUN) as well as between Boise and Sun Valley.

Key Airlines made headlines on the sports pages in November 1978, when it was part of a forfeited college football game. Idaho State University chartered two Convair 440 aircraft from Key to carry its football team from Pocatello to its night game with the University of Idaho in Moscow. To forego lodging, ISU chose to fly on game day, but the plane carrying the Bengals' defense developed carburetor problems shortly after take-off and turned back. Both teams were having poor seasons in the Big Sky Conference and opted not to reschedule, as both schools' indoor stadiums were soon changing over to basketball configurations.

Key focused on charter flights and discontinued regularly scheduled service in April 1979. However, by the early 1990s, the airline would once again fly scheduled passenger services via a hub operation in Savannah, Georgia.

=== Jet operations ===
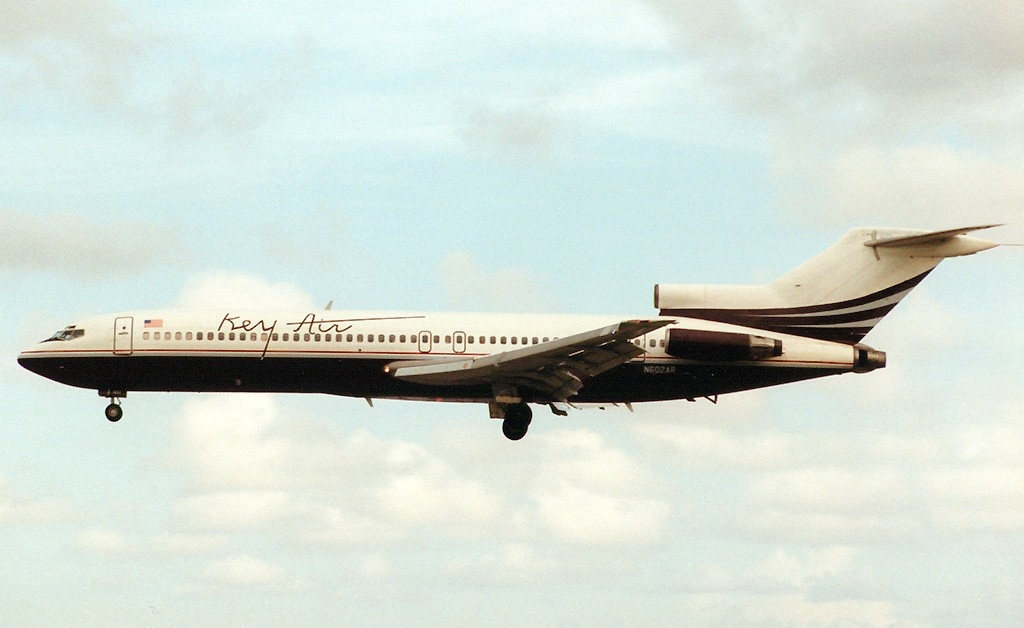
A Key Air Boeing 727-200 landing at Miami International Airport, Florida, United States. (1990)

In 1983 the airline was sold and relocated to McCarran International Airport in Las Vegas, Nevada. A Boeing 727-100 was operated with charter flights to Miami, the Caribbean and Mexico.

Key Air was acquired by Presidential Airways in 1986 and then was purchased again one year later by World Airways; however, in both cases Key Air continued to operate with its own name. With the World Airways ownership, a McDonnell Douglas DC-10 wide body jetliner was introduced for charter flights to Europe and Asia on behalf of World Airways and the Key Air base was moved to Savannah, Georgia. In 1992, Key Air was sold by World Airways. By then, Key Air was operating scheduled passenger flights with Boeing 727s and its financial situation had become challenging with the result that service had to be cut back and aircraft disposed of. By 1993, the company sought Chapter 11 bankruptcy protection. Many of the 727s were sold and several new leased McDonnell Douglas MD-83 jetliners were placed into service; however, the end came a few months later when in May 1993 the airline was liquidated.

In the early 1980s, Key Air was contracted by the U.S. Air Force to operate dozens of daily flights between Nellis Air Force Base and Tonopah Test Range, where the F-117 Nighthawk aircraft was being secretly tested. Service commenced with Convair 580 turboprop aircraft. Later, these aircraft were replaced with 727's and 737's also were used. Tonopah sits at over 5500 feet of altitude. The 737's suffered from density altitude issues and were unable to accommodate full passenger loads in summer. The airline subsequently removed the 737's from service between Nellis and Tonopah. The service continued until early 1991 when the contract was awarded to American Trans Air. One of these aircraft regularly operating this route was N29KA, a Boeing 727 and former Northwest Airlines aircraft which had been hijacked in 1971 in the enigmatic D. B. Cooper incident.

=== The Savannah hub ===
At one point, Key Air operated a passenger hub at the main airport serving Savannah, Georgia (SAV) with international flights to destinations in the Caribbean and Mexico as well as a number of domestic flights in the U.S. also being flown from Savannah. According to the airline's system timetable dated October 1, 1992, nonstop services were operated on a regularly scheduled basis from Savannah with mainline jet aircraft such as the Boeing 727-100 and Boeing 727-200 as well as the McDonnell Douglas MD-80 to the following destinations:

- Antigua (ANU)
- Aruba (AUA)
- Atlanta (ATL)
- Baltimore (BWI)
- Boston (BOS)
- Cancun (CUN)
- Chicago - Midway Airport (MDW)
- Cozumel (CZM)
- Curaçao (CUR)
- Freeport (FPO)
- Montego Bay (MBJ)
- Nassau (NAS)
- New York City - Newark Airport (EWR)
- Orlando (MCO)
- St. Croix (STX) (one stop direct service via St. Thomas)
- St. Maarten (SXM)
- St. Thomas (STT)

== Fleet ==
=== Prop and Turboprop Fleet ===
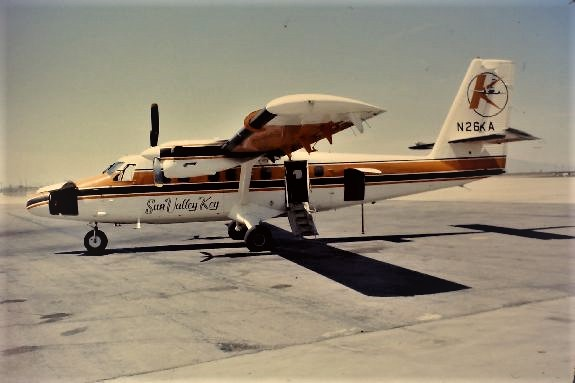
Sun Valley Key Twin Otter

Prop and Turboprop Fleet
| Aircraft | Total |
|---|---|
| Beechcraft Queen Air | ? |
| Convair CV-440 Metropolitan | 4 |
| de Havilland Canada DHC-6-300 Twin Otter | 3 |
| Piper Cherokee | ? |
| Piper Navajo | ? |

=== Jet Fleet ===
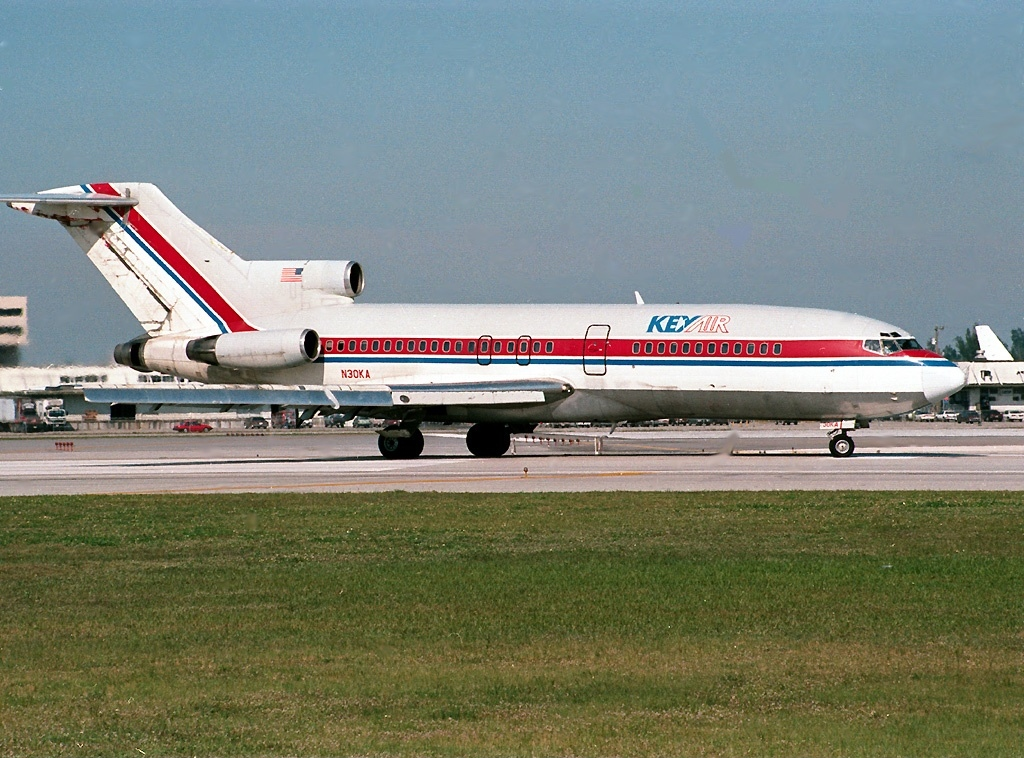
A Key Air Boeing 727-22 at Miami International Airport, Florida, United States

Jet Fleet
| Aircraft | Total |
|---|---|
| Boeing 727-022 | 5 |
| Boeing 727-051 | 1 |
| Boeing 727-095 | 3 |
| Boeing 727-228 | 2 |
| Boeing 727-247 | 1 |
| Boeing 737-204 | 1 |
| McDonnell Douglas DC-10-10 | 1 |
| McDonnell Douglas MD-83 | 3 |

== See also ==
- List of defunct airlines of the United States
