= Alpine Air Express =

American cargo airline

IATA	ICAO	Call sign
5A	AIP	ALPINE AIR
- Founded: 1971; 55 years ago
- Hubs: Billings; Denver; Salt Lake City; Sioux Falls
- Fleet size: 68
- Destinations: 72
- Parent company: AE Industrial Partners
- Headquarters: Provo, Utah, United States
- Key people: Michael Dancy (CEO); Bob Frisch (COO); Kevin Wade (CFO)
- Website: alpine-air.com

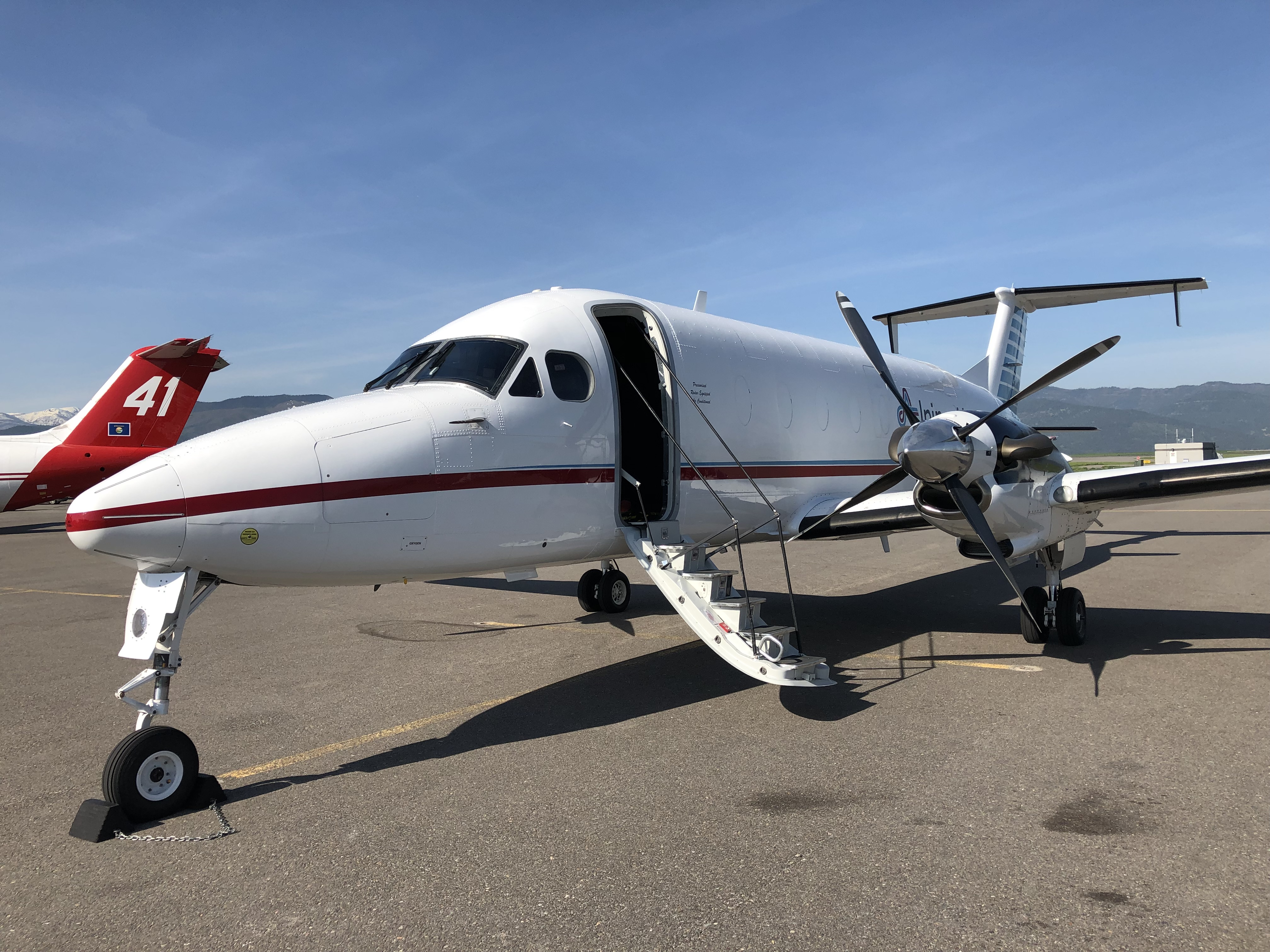
Alpine Air Beechcraft 1900D

Alpine Air Express is an American airline based in Provo, Utah. It operates scheduled and chartered air cargo services on over 100 routes throughout Utah, Montana, Minnesota, western Wisconsin, Nebraska, North Dakota, South Dakota, Wyoming, Idaho, California, and Colorado.

== History ==
The airline was established in 1971 and received its Air Carrier Certificate in 1979. It originally operated scheduled passenger and cargo services, aircraft maintenance and a flight school with passenger services being discontinued in 1999.

While Alpine Air was performing scheduled passenger operations in the 1980s and 1990s, it served the following cities in Utah, Colorado, and Nevada:

- Blanding, UT
- Cedar City, UT
- Delta, UT
- Duchesne, UT
- Ely, NV
- Grand Junction, CO
- Green River, UT
- Manti, UT
- Moab, UT
- Monroe, UT
- Monticello, UT
- Mt. Pleasant, UT
- Nephi, UT
- Price, UT
- Provo, UT
- Richfield, UT
- Roosevelt, UT
- Salina, UT
- Salt Lake City, UT
- St. George, UT
- Vernal, UT

Some cities were served by Scenic Aviation and Castle Valley Aviation, on-demand charter services operating on behalf of Alpine Air.

In 2001, the company began a shift towards a larger cargo presence with their first public trade of stock and their first Beech 1900 being placed into service. It was this same year which they commenced operations out of their new Provo facility.

The airline tried to establish Alpine Air Chile, in an attempt to enter Chile's air freight market. The project was not successful and was discontinued in 2005, with three Beechcraft 1900C being re-integrated into the US fleet.

Alpine Air Express now currently only operates CFR Part 135 scheduled and chartered cargo operations.

Into 2025, the carrier had done work to develop the Alpine Super Freighter, a modified version of the Beech 1900D. The modification allows the airline to carry more cargo per flight, making cargo runs more efficient.

== Fleet ==
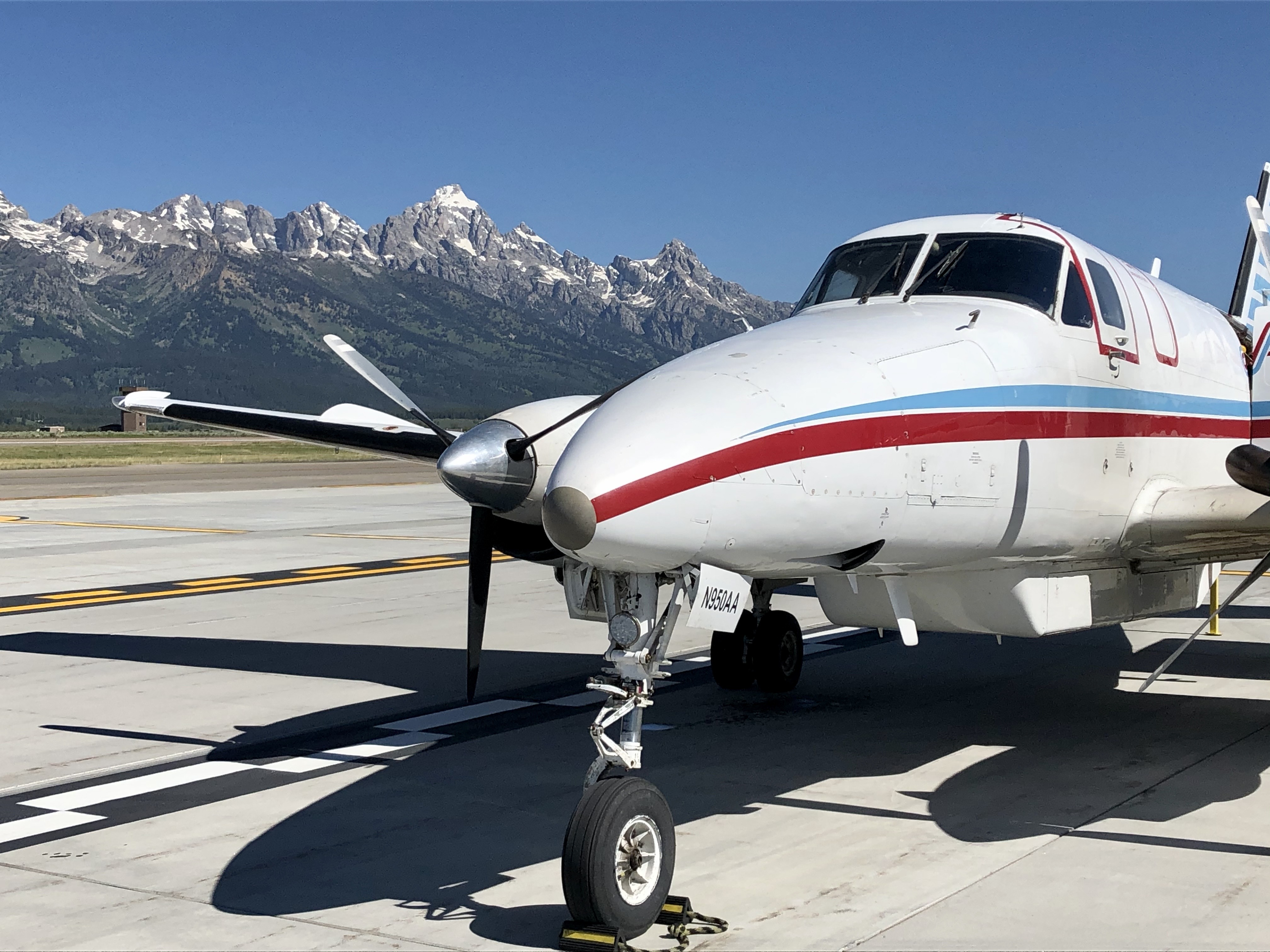
Alpine Air Express Beechcraft 99 at Jackson Hole Airport

The Alpine Air Express fleet includes the following aircraft.

Aircraft	In fleet
Beechcraft 1900C	28 (as of August 2025)
Beechcraft 1900D	32(as of August 2025)
Beechcraft Model 99	14(as of August 2025)
Beechcraft Super King Air	1
Cessna 208 Caravan	1
Total	68

== Acquisition and expansion ==
In May 2014, KEB Enterprises acquired a controlling interest in Alpine Air Express by purchasing most of the shares from its majority owner.

As of May 2019, AE Industrial Partners acquired majority interest in Alpine Air Express.

In April 2020, Alpine Air Express purchased assets of the defunct Great Lakes Airlines which included 27 aircraft and various parts, engines, propellers and ground support equipment. Included are 25 Beech 1900D aircraft that are to be converted to cargo use through their "Super Freighter" Supplemental Type Certificate.

In December 2022, Alpine Air Express acquired Suburban Air Freight, another CFR Part-135 cargo airline based in Omaha, NE . Suburban Air, like Alpine, has a majority Beech 1900 fleet allowing for easy integration of maintenance and operations.

== Incidents ==
In October 1992, an Alpine Air PA-42 deviated off course and crashed into a mesa in Grand Junction, Colorado, while operating as an airtaxi flight. There were three fatalities: the pilot and two passengers.

August 2004 – While operating a Billings to Kalispell, Montana, flight for the US Postal Service, the Beech 99 crashed into Big Baldy mountain, located near Great Falls. Two crewmembers died.

January 2008—An Alpine Air Raytheon Beech 1900 crashed into the Pacific Ocean on a cargo flight between Honolulu International Airport and Lihue Intl in Hawaii. This crash claimed one life: the pilot of the aircraft.

May 2008—Upon departure from Billings, ATC instructed the Beech 1900C to turn left. The Part 135 cargo plane slowly turned right and crashed into a warehouse nearby. Witnesses say the plane was inverted prior to the crash which claimed the life of the single pilot on board.

In February 2010, a cargo door came unlatched on an airborne Alpine Air Express Beech 99 carrying mail from Billings, to Kalispell, Montana, at about 1:30 a.m. The plane was about 40 miles (64 km) north of Lewistown, Montana, when the pilot noted a light on the instrument panel had come on, indicating the door was unlatched. Because there was about 3,000 pounds (1,400 kg) of mail cargo between the pilot and the door, he couldn't close it. Because the door is located below the plane's airstream, even when open it wouldn't compromise the ability to fly and land the plane.
