= (KDO)2-lipid IVA (2-8) 3-deoxy-D-manno-octulosonic acid transferase =

Class of enzymes

Identifiers
- EC no.: 2.4.99.14

Databases
- IntEnz: IntEnz view
- BRENDA: BRENDA entry
- ExPASy: NiceZyme view
- KEGG: KEGG entry
- MetaCyc: metabolic pathway
- PRIAM: profile
- PDB structures: RCSB PDB PDBe PDBsum
Search
- PMC: articles
- PubMed: articles
- NCBI: proteins

(KDO)2-lipid IVA (2-8) 3-deoxy-D-manno-octulosonic acid transferase (EC 2.4.99.14, KDO transferase, waaA (gene), kdtA (gene), 3-deoxy-D-manno-oct-2-ulosonic acid transferase, 3-deoxy-manno-octulosonic acid transferase) is an enzyme with systematic name CMP-3-deoxy-D-manno-oct-2-ulosonate:(KDO)2-lipid IVA 3-deoxy-D-manno-oct-2-ulosonate transferase ((2->8) glycosidic bond-forming). This enzyme catalyses the following chemical reaction

alpha-Kdo-(2->4)-alpha-Kdo-(2->6)-lipid IVA + CMP-alpha-Kdo $\rightleftharpoons$ alpha-Kdo-(2->8)-alpha-Kdo-(2->4)-alpha-Kdo-(2->6)-lipid IVA + CMP

The enzymes from Chlamydia transfer three or more 3-deoxy-D-manno-oct-2-ulosonate residues and generate genus-specific epitopes.
