= Teterboro Airport =

General aviation airport in Teterboro, New Jersey

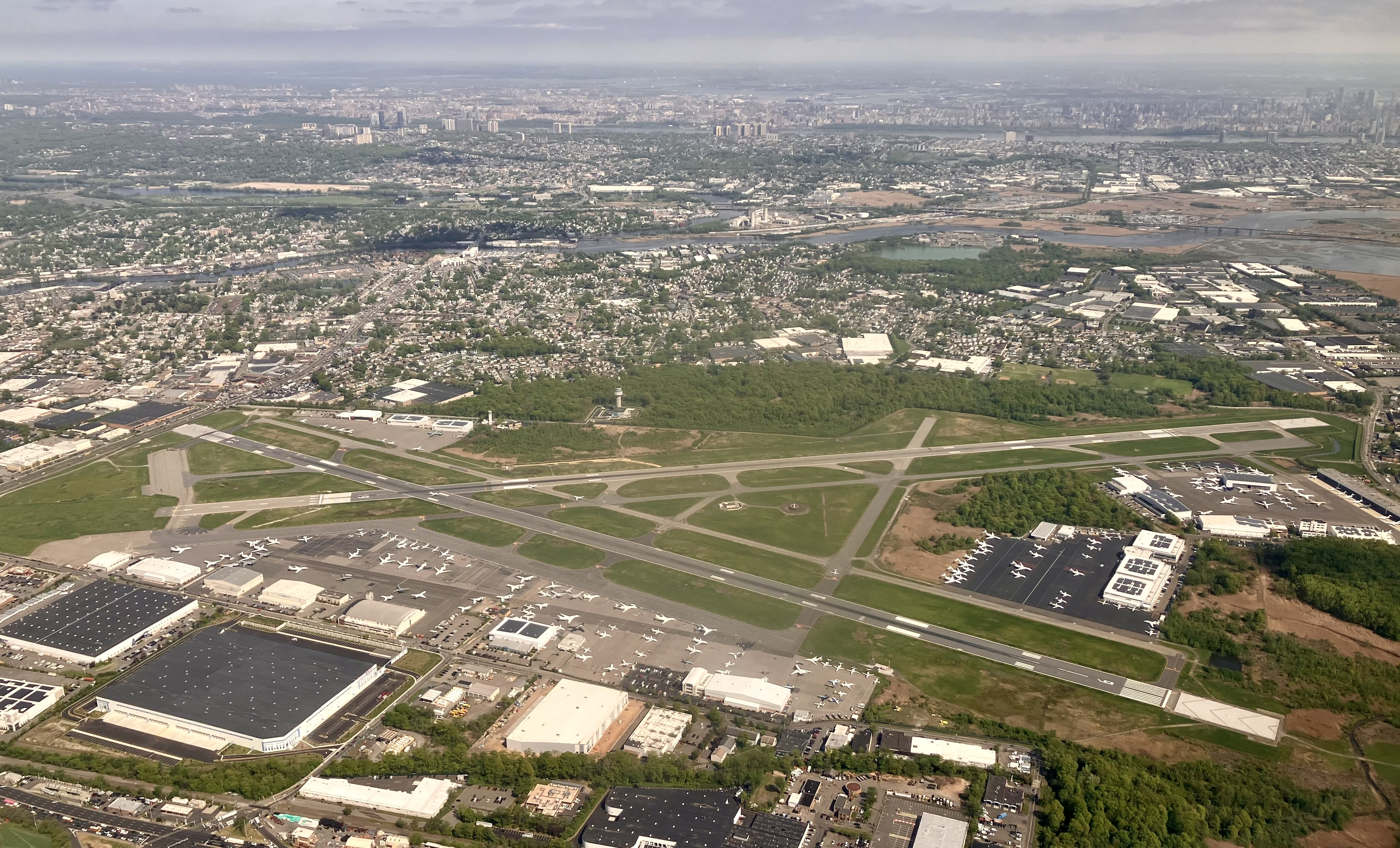
- IATA: TEB; ICAO: KTEB; FAA LID: TEB

Summary
- Airport type: Public
- Owner/Operator: Port Authority of New York and New Jersey
- Serves: Teterboro, New Jersey
- Location: Bergen County, New Jersey
- Hub for: Tradewind Aviation
- Elevation AMSL: 8.4 ft (2.6 m)
- Coordinates: 40°51′00″N 074°03′39″W
- Website: www.panynj.gov/airports/teterboro.html

Maps
- FAA diagram
- Interactive map of Teterboro Airport

Runways
Direction	Length		Surface
Direction	ft	m	Surface
01/19	7,000	2,134	Asphalt
06/24	6,013	1,833	Asphalt

Statistics (2019)
- Aircraft operations: 173,625
- Based aircraft: 121
- Source: Federal Aviation Administration

Teterboro Airport (IATA: TEB, ICAO: KTEB, FAA LID: TEB) is a general aviation relief airport situated in the boroughs of Teterboro, Moonachie, and Hasbrouck Heights in Bergen County, New Jersey. It is owned and managed by the Port Authority of New York and New Jersey, and operated by AFCO AvPORTS Management. The airport is in the New Jersey Meadowlands, 12 miles (19 km) north-northwest of Midtown Manhattan, making it popular for private and corporate aircraft. The airport has a weight limit of 100,000 pounds (45,000 kg) on aircraft, making it nonviable for any commercial service.

The airport takes up almost all of Teterboro and consists of 827 acres (3.35 km^{2}): 90 acres (0.36 km^{2}) for aircraft hangar and offices, 408 acres (1.65 km^{2}) for aeronautical use and runways, and 329 acres (1.33 km^{2}) undeveloped. The airport has more than 1,137 employees, of whom more than 90% work full-time.

In April 2009, the Federal Aviation Administration (FAA) reported that the airport had the third-highest rate of wildlife strikes of any airport in the United States, based on takeoffs and landings (43 per 100,000).

Teterboro is home to many private aviation charter companies flying both nationally and globally.

== History ==
Teterboro Airport is the oldest operating airport in the New York City area. Walter C. Teter (1863–1929) acquired the property in 1917, and North American Aviation operated a manufacturing plant on the site during World War I. After the war, the airport served as a base of operations for Anthony Fokker, the Dutch aircraft designer. The first flight from the present airport site was made in 1919. In 1926, Colonial Air Transport at Teterboro was the first private company to deliver mail by air.

During World War II, the United States Army operated at the airport. The Port of New York Authority came to a deal with Frederic Wehran on August 12, 1948 to purchase the airport for $3.015 million. At the time of the signed agreement, the Port Authority gave Wehran $100,000. The rest, official as of April 2, 1949, would be $1.4 million in bonds and $548,000 in cash. The rest would go to discharging the $967,000 mortgage on the airport. The Port Authority later leased it to Pan American World Airways (and its successor organization Johnson Controls) for 30 years until December 1, 2000, when the Port Authority assumed full responsibility for the operation of Teterboro.

Since 1977, aircraft greater than 100,000 pounds (45 t) are not allowed to take off from Teterboro, effectively banning commercial service. In 2003, U.S. Congressman Steve Rothman helped authorize a federal bill codifying the ban, citing excessive noise in the surrounding residential areas.

In 2019, Teterboro Airport trailed Republic Airport in total number of aircraft operations by 46,047 (173,625 at TEB vs 219,672 at FRG), making it the second busiest general aviation airport in the region and fifth busiest airport when including operations from Kennedy Airport (463,198), Newark Airport (449,543), and LaGuardia Airport (374,539).

In 2020, during the COVID-19 pandemic, the airport saw a significant drop in total number of aircraft operations, with a reduction in traffic to 86,465 (difference in 87,160 flights); however, Teterboro leads Republic Airport in transient flights, while Republic has more local general aviation traffic, with 165,250 flights during the pandemic.

== Airlines and destinations ==
=== Passenger ===
Airlines	Destinations
Aero	Charter: Los Angeles–Van Nuys; Seasonal charter: Aspen
JSX	Charter: Fort Lauderdale–Executive, Miami–Opa Locka, West Palm Beach
Tradewind Aviation	Seasonal charter: Martha's Vineyard, Nantucket

== Facilities ==
Teterboro Airport covers 827 acres (335 ha) at an elevation of 8.4 feet (2.6 m).

=== Air traffic control ===
The airport's first air control tower opened in 1975. In October 2025, a new $73.4 million 157 feet (48 m) tower opened on top of a 19,000 sq ft (1,800 m^{2}) base.

=== Runways ===
Runway 6-24 is 6,013 feet (1,833 m) long and 150 feet (46 m) wide, with High Intensity Runway Lights (HIRL). Runway 6 approach has an Instrument Landing System (ILS), and a Medium Approach Lighting System-R (MALS-R). Runway 24 approach is equipped with both a Precision Approach Path Indicator (PAPI) and Runway End Identification Lights (REIL) systems. Runway 6-24 underwent complete overlay and grooving in 1987.

Runway 1-19 is 7,000 feet (2,100 m) long and 150 feet (46 m) wide, with HIRL. Both runways 1 and 19 are equipped with REIL systems. Runway 1 approach is equipped with a VASI system. Runway 19 approach has an ILS, and a Precision Approach Path Indicator (PAPI). Runway 1-19 was overlaid and grooved in the summer of 2000, and included the installation of centerline and touchdown zone lighting. Runway 19 is the preferred runway for noise abatement procedures.

=== Aircraft ===
In 2017, the airport had 178,369 aircraft operations, averaging 488 per day: 65.6% general aviation, 34% air taxi, 0.3% military, and <1% airline. 121 aircraft were then based at this airport: 81% jet, 10.7% helicopter, 6.6% single-engine, and 1.7% multi-engine.

=== Law enforcement ===
Since the September 11, 2001, terrorist attacks, law enforcement at Teterboro Airport has been in the hands of the Newark Liberty International Airport Command of the Port Authority of New York and New Jersey Police Department. In addition to normal uniformed patrol of terminals, concourses, and parking lots, the PAPD provides anti-crime plainclothes units, criminal investigative detective squads, counter-terrorism units, high-value cargo escorts and patrols, dignitary protection, passenger screening point protection and security, Aircraft Rescue Fire Fighting and community outreach. The PAPD operates alongside partner agencies, including the Transportation Security Administration (TSA), U.S. Customs and Border Protection (CBP), and the New Jersey State Police.

=== Other ===
The Aviation Hall of Fame of New Jersey is on the airport grounds. Founded in 1972, it is the first state aviation hall of fame in the nation, honoring the men and women who brought outstanding aeronautical achievements to the state. The museum offers visitors an opportunity to view historic air and space equipment and artifacts, photographs, fine art and an extensive model collection. The library has more than 4,000 volumes and hundreds of aviation video tapes.

== Public transportation ==
Teterboro Airport can be reached from the Port Authority Bus Terminal in Midtown Manhattan on New Jersey Transit bus routes 161 (regular service), 165 (limited weekday service) and 144 (peak periods weekdays). The Teterboro station is the closest rail station along NJ Transit's Pascack Valley Line, but Wood-Ridge station, along the same route, is also close to the southwest of the airport.

== Notable incidents ==
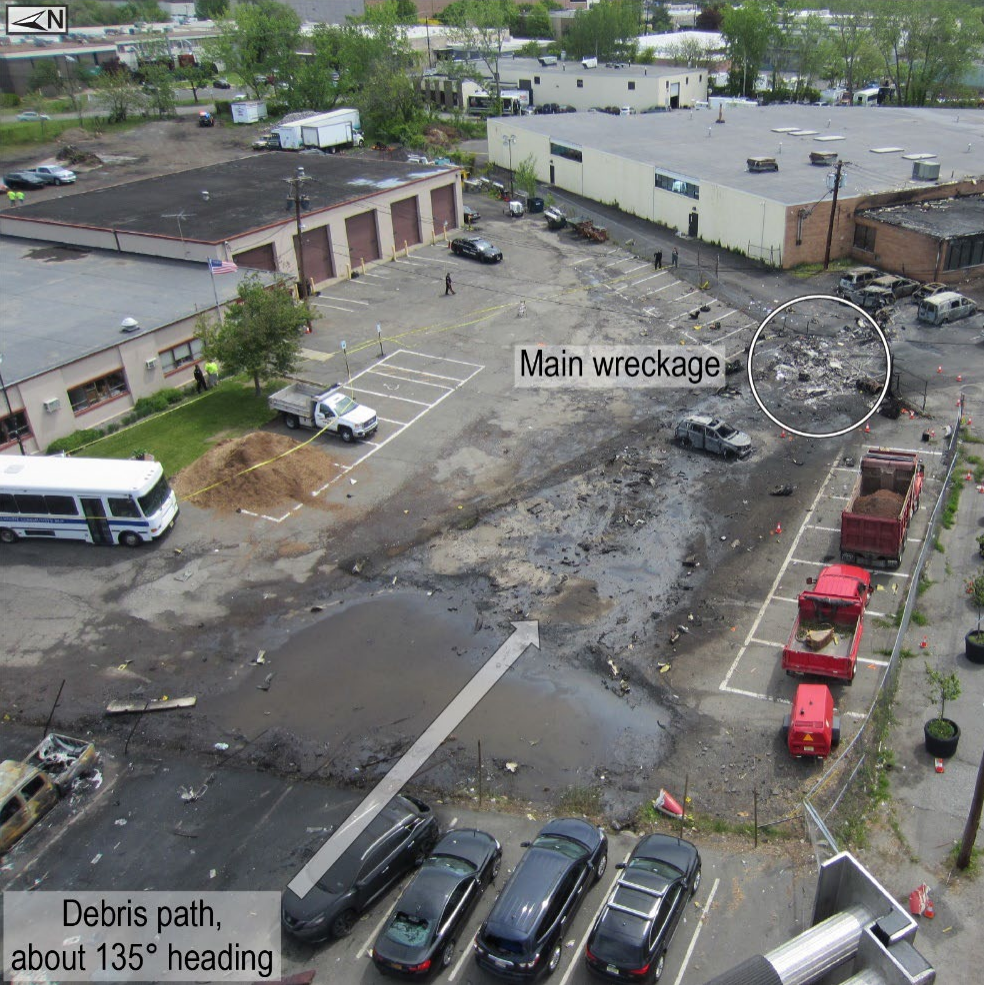
Aftermath of the 2017 Teterboro Learjet crash

- In 1956 and again in 1958, Thomas Fitzpatrick flew stolen aircraft from Teterboro and landed them along city streets in the Washington Heights, Manhattan neighborhood.
- In June 1966, in Hasbrouck Heights, a two-engine Piper Aztec going to Teterboro Airport crashed, striking a tree and narrowly missing homes on Burton Avenue near U.S. Route 46 (US 46). The pilot sustained injuries including a skull fracture and was taken to Hackensack Hospital by ambulance. He was carrying film for Eastman Kodak.
- On September 23, 1981, a Ronson Aviation Bell 206B helicopter and a Seminole Air Charier Piper PA-34 airplane collided in flight over East Rutherford, about 2 nautical miles (3.7 km; 2.3 mi) south of Teterboro Airport. The airplane had a flight plan to Teterboro from Syracuse, New York. The helicopter was inbound to Teterboro from Woodbridge, NJ. The two collided at an altitude of about 650 feet (200 m). The helicopter fell into the Meadowlands Sports Complex parking lot, and both persons aboard were killed. The airplane, with about 8 feet (2.4 m) of its left wing and its right engine missing, made a gear-up landing in a marsh about 0.7 nautical miles (1.3 km; 0.81 mi) east of the collision point. The pilot was seriously injured, and the passenger received minor injuries.
- On December 9, 1999, a small plane crashed between two houses in neighboring Hasbrouck Heights, killing all four people aboard, injuring three people on the ground and setting a garage on fire.
- On March 9, 2002, a single-engine Cessna 210 with a flight plan to Montauk, NY, crashed shortly after takeoff about 2 p.m. killing the only occupant and pilot. Upon impact the plane skidded about 225 feet (69 m) before it burst into flames, narrowly missing cars on US 46 about 100 yards (90 m) away.
- On September 9, 2002, a Piper Saratoga carrying a Canadian family took off from Teterboro Airport and crashed into a housing development in Hunterdon County 10 minutes later. The parents were killed, and the two children were critically injured. The incident caused millions in damage.
- On February 2, 2005, at 7:18 a.m., a Bombardier Challenger CL-600-1A11, N370V, hurtled off a runway at Teterboro Airport, skidded across US 46 and slammed into a warehouse during the morning rush, injuring 20 people, 11 of them on the plane. The two pilots were seriously injured, as were two occupants in a vehicle. The cabin aide, eight passengers, and one person in the building received minor injuries. Five people remained hospitalized, one of them gravely injured. A 66-year-old Paterson man who was riding in a car the jet struck was on life support, authorities said. Later that year, Congress passed legislation authored by U.S. Senator Frank Lautenberg that directed the FAA to install 1,000 feet (300 m) arrestor beds at all U.S. airports.
- On September 2, 2005, at 21:22 local time, a Cessna 177A, N30491, crashed in South Hackensack during an emergency landing at Teterboro airport. A Teterboro employee observed the plane descending toward runway 24, lost sight of it as it descended below the horizon, then saw two or three bright flashes. The pilot sustained fatal injuries and the passenger serious injuries.
- On October 11, 2006, a Cirrus SR20 took off from Teterboro and crashed in New York City at 2:42 pm local time. The aircraft struck the north side of an apartment building on the Upper East Side of Manhattan; it caused a fire in two apartments on the 40th and 41st floors, which was extinguished within an hour. The aircraft was owned and piloted by New York Yankees pitcher Cory Lidle, who died in the accident along with his flight instructor. As a result of this accident the FAA established restrictions on flying up the East River.
- Two midair collisions have occurred over the Hudson River involving aircraft that departed from Teterboro, one in 1976, and one in 2009. As a result of the later accident the FAA came up with new guidelines for pilots flying the Hudson River, including mandatory reporting points and separating slower helicopter traffic from faster fixed-wing traffic via assigned altitude blocks.
- On August 21, 2009, around 3:00 a.m., a Beechcraft Baron crashed while attempting to land. The pilot and passenger survived but sustained burns requiring the attention of Saint Barnabas Medical Center's burn unit, the only one in the state of New Jersey. The plane was believed to have originated at Reading, PA, and was carrying blood samples for Quest Diagnostics, which had a lab on property adjacent to Teterboro Airport.
- On December 20, 2011, a single-engine TBM700 crashed on Interstate 287 near Morristown after leaving Teterboro Airport headed for Georgia. Five people, including a family of four and one other passenger, were killed.
- On May 15, 2017, at about 3:30 p.m., a Learjet 35 stalled and crashed about 1/4 mile (400 m) away while approaching Runway 1. The pilot and co-pilot were killed; no others were on board. It had departed Philadelphia International Airport shortly before. The National Transportation Safety Board (NTSB) safety recommendations from this accident included a requirement for "operators to establish programs for flight crewmembers who have demonstrated performance deficiencies or experienced failures during training and administer additional oversight and training to address and correct performance deficiencies."

== Jeffrey Epstein sex-trafficking ==
Wealthy financier and convicted sex offender Jeffrey Epstein used Teterboro as a hub for his Lolita Express flights to various locations. It was also the site of his July 2019 arrest on sex-trafficking charges.

== In popular culture ==
- In January 1954, Arthur Godfrey buzzed the Teterboro control tower with his Douglas DC-3, resulting in a six-month suspension of his license. Godfrey claimed that windy conditions forced him to turn immediately after takeoff when, in fact, he was angry with the tower due to him not getting clearance on the runway that he requested. Seven years later, in 1961, Godfrey recorded a satirical song about the incident called "Teterboro Tower." The song, performed roughly to the tune of "Wabash Cannonball", was released as a 45-RPM single by Contempo Records.
- On July 24, 1973, Bob Gruen photographed Led Zeppelin in front of The Starship, the band's private Boeing 720 passenger jet, before it departed for a live performance at Three Rivers Stadium in Pittsburgh. The photo is considered an iconic shot of the band.
- In the final scene of the 1994 film Wolf, Michelle Pfeiffer's character, Laura Alden, tells detectives that Jack Nicholson's character, Will Randall, is most likely on his way to Teterboro Airport. Moments later, a detective confirms that a plane chartered by Alden is waiting at the airport.
- The airport can be seen in two episodes of The Sopranos. In the first episode of the second season, the airport can be seen in the background of a driving scene, doubling as Newark Liberty International Airport. The airport is also seen and mentioned, by name, in the series finale.
- In 2003, Jay-Z coined the nickname "clearport" for Teterboro on his song "Excuse Me Miss", in reference to Teterboro having less traffic than other major commercial airports in the New York metropolitan area.
- In the 2014 sports drama film Draft Day, the character of Anthony Molina, the fictional owner of the Cleveland Browns, demands to be driven to Teterboro Airport from the NFL draft in Manhattan.
- The airport is mentioned as a potential emergency landing location for US Airways Flight 1549 in the 2016 biographical drama film Sully, as it was in the true life 2009 event the film is based on.
- In the first-season finale of the 2021 television series Chucky, the airport is mentioned as the destination for a truckload of Good Guy dolls.
- In the 2022 film Uncharted, the characters Nathan Drake and Victor Sullivan travel to Barcelona via Teterboro Airport.
- In May 2022, the airport was used as a location in the fourth episode of the Netflix comedy series, The Pentaverate when a helicopter piloted by the Mike Myers character, Ken Scarborough, is remotely controlled to land at Teterboro Airport.
- In the debut issue of New Fantastic Four, published by Marvel Comics in June 2022, Wolverine informs Spider-Man that he has a cab waiting to bring them to Teterboro Airport.
- In 2023, the airport was featured in the third episode of the fourth season of the HBO TV show Succession.
- In the 2025 Netflix crime thriller miniseries, Black Rabbit, the two main characters, portrayed by Jude Law and Jason Bateman, make a deal with a fixer to meet at Teterboro Airport and make an exchange.

== See also ==
- Aviation in the New York metropolitan area
- List of airports in New Jersey
- US Airways Flight 1549
