= Napa Valley Economic Development Corporation =

The Napa Valley Economic Development Corporation (NVEDC) was a non-profit economic development corporation operating in Napa County, California. Its mission was to "develop a sustainable, balanced and diverse economy, while supporting Napa's Agricultural Preserve."

NVEDC (formerly called the Napa City/County Development Corporation) was formed in 1984 as a successor to the Napa Business Development Council. NVEDC's goals are to promote industrial and commercial business development, to create quality employment opportunities for Napa County residents, and to provide leadership on community issues.

Some of NVEDC's achievements included establishing a Hospitality School, facilitating the creation of an economic development strategic plan for the city of American Canyon, and conducting a regional inventory of the business parks located in American Canyon, the City of Napa and around the Napa County Airport.

NVEDC became inactive by 2009.
