= Aero (American airline) =

Regional airline of the United States

| IATA | ICAO | Call sign |
|---|---|---|
| 5E | BLK | AERO BLACK |
- Founded: 2019; 7 years ago
- AOC #: 5U5A029Q
- Operating bases: Van Nuys
- Fleet size: 6
- Destinations: 11
- Headquarters: Van Nuys, California, United States
- Key people: Ben Klein (CEO); Garrett Camp (Founder)
- Website: www.aero.com

Aero, legally Aero Technologies, Inc., is an American air carrier headquartered in Van Nuys, California. The airline operates point-to-point flights between and within California, Colorado, Idaho, Nevada, New Jersey, Utah, and Hawaii in the United States and Baja California Sur in Mexico.

== History ==
The airline was founded in 2019 by Garrett Camp, the co-founder of Uber. In August 2022, Aero secured a $65m capital raise, $50m in Series B funding and $15m in convertible notes, which brought a total valuation to $300m.

=== Aero UK ===
Aero UK, which operated a mixed fleet of Embraer ERJ-135 and Embraer Legacy 600 aircraft under a UK AOC, sought to establish itself in the semi-private and charter market following Aero’s expansion from the United States. Flights to Nice and Geneva from London started in December 2021. Aero UK added Milan in March 2022.

However, due to ongoing operational and commercial challenges, it ceased all flight operations by October 2023.

== Corporate affairs ==
For regulatory purposes, Aero is set up as public charter operator. Aircraft are operated by subsidiary USAC Airways 695, LLC and Aero resells seats on the aircraft to the public.

== Destinations ==
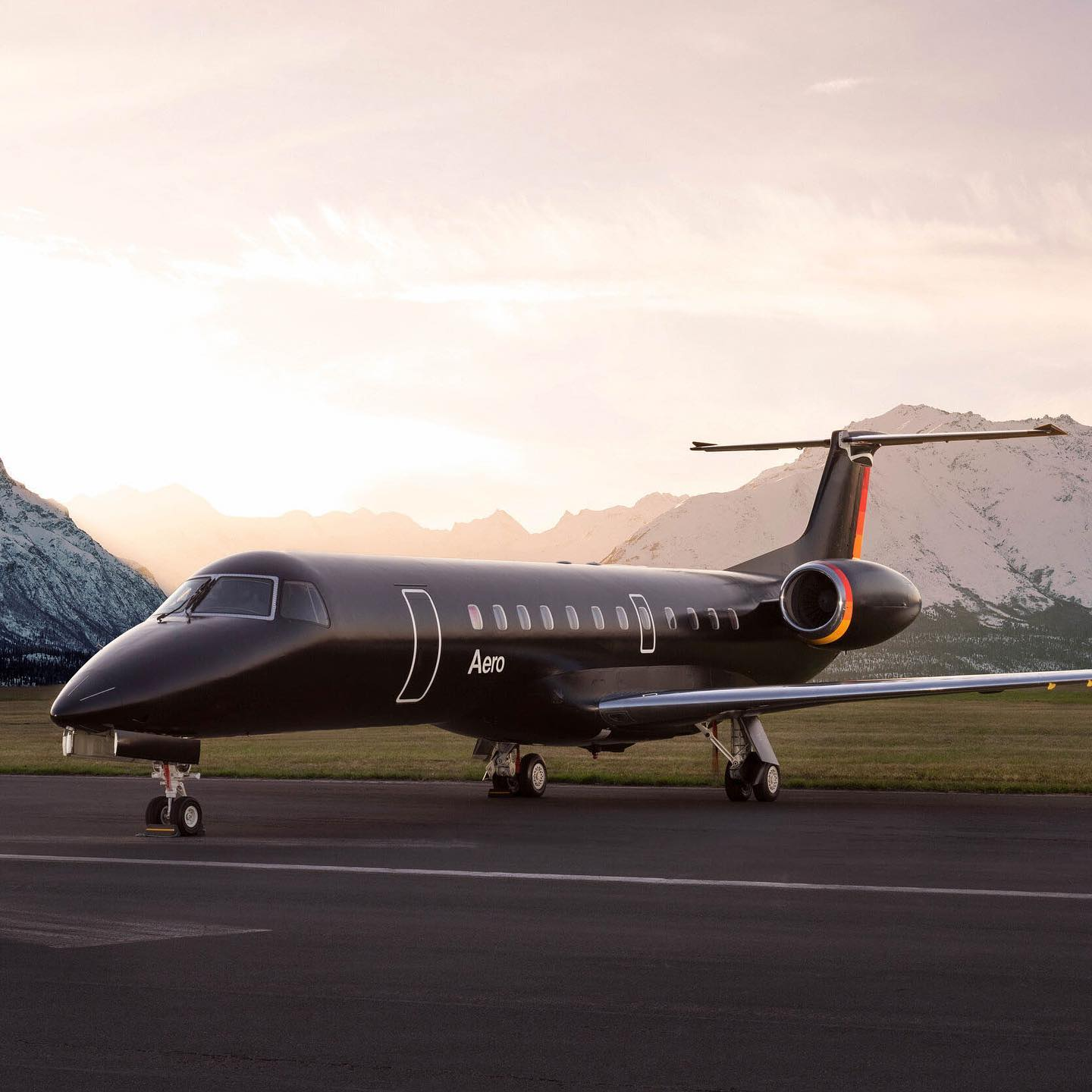
Aero ERJ-135 jet on the ramp

In January 2025, Aero launched nonstop flights between Los Angeles and Salt Lake City timed to coincide with the Sundance Film Festival. Later in 2025, for the ski season, the airline moved operations to Heber Valley Airport to give passengers closer access to ski areas near Park City and Deer Valley.

In August 2025, Aero and Four Seasons Resort Maui at Wailea announced the launch of weekly semi-private flights from Los Angeles (Van Nuys Airport, VNY) to Kahului, Maui, beginning November 2025. This is described as the “first scheduled semi-private route between mainland America and the Hawaiian Islands open to all travelers.”

In December 2025, Aero introduced nonstop Aspen–New York City flights, making it the sole airline to operate a direct route between the two markets.

Aero serves the following destinations as of December 2025:

| Country | City | Airport | Notes | Ref. |
|---|---|---|---|---|
| England | London | Farnborough Airport | Terminated | |
| France | Nice | Nice Côte d'Azur Airport | Terminated | |
| Greece | Mykonos | Mykonos Airport | Terminated | |
| Mexico | Cabo San Lucas | Cabo San Lucas International Airport | Seasonal | |
| Mexico | San Jose del Cabo | Los Cabos International Airport | | |
| Spain | Ibiza | Ibiza Airport | Terminated | |
| Switzerland | Geneva | Geneva Airport | Terminated | |
| Switzerland | Sion | Sion Airport | Terminated | |
| United States | Napa | Napa County Airport | Seasonal | |
| United States | Thermal | Jacqueline Cochran Regional Airport | Seasonal | |
| United States | Los Angeles | Van Nuys Airport | Base | |
| United States | Aspen | Aspen/Pitkin County Airport | | |
| United States | Kahului | Kahului Airport | | |
| United States | Hailey | Friedman Memorial Airport | | |
| United States | Las Vegas | Harry Reid International Airport | | |
| United States | Teterboro | Teterboro Airport | | |
| United States | Salt Lake City | Salt Lake City International Airport | | |
| United States | Heber City | Heber City Municipal Airport | Seasonal | |
| United States | Jackson Hole | Jackson Hole Airport | Seasonal | |

== Fleet ==
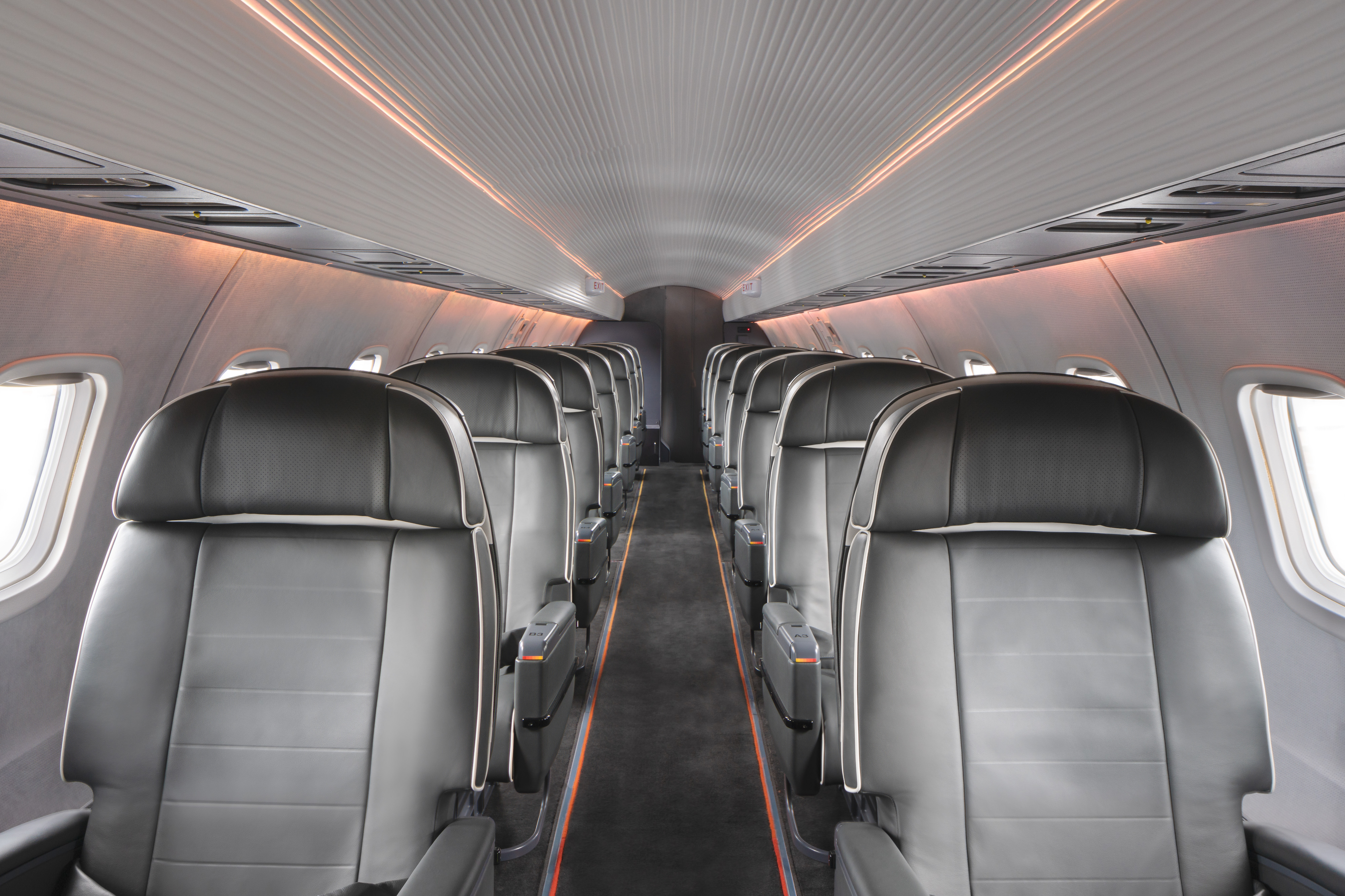
Interior of the Aero ERJ-135 jet in a 1-1 layout

Each jet has a first class seat configuration with two seats per row, separated by an aisle. This means each seat has both window and aisle access, offers 43 inches of legroom, and is upholstered in premium leather.

Aero have fitted all aircraft with Starlink wifi.

As of December 2025, Aero operates the following aircraft:

Aero fleet
| Aircraft | In service | Orders | Passengers | Notes |
|---|---|---|---|---|
| Embraer ERJ-135LR | 4 | — | 16 | |
| Embraer Legacy 600 | 1 | — | 13 | |
| Gulfstream IV | 1 | 3 | 12 | Aircraft deliveries from 2025. |
| Total | 6 | 3 | | |
