= 2017 Teterboro Learjet 35 crash =

Aviation accident in New Jersey, U.S.

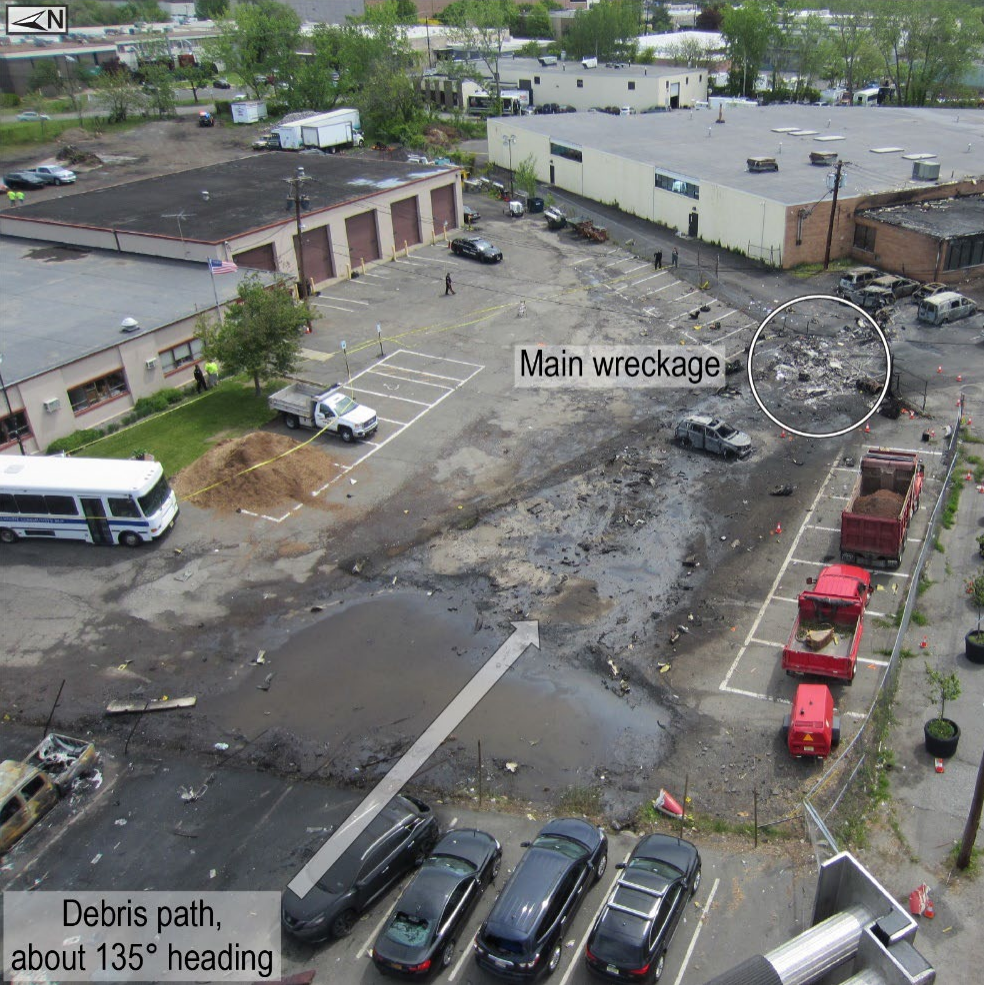
- An annotated image of the crash site of N452DA

Accident
- Date: May 15, 2017
- Summary: Stall during circle-to-land approach
- Site: Near Teterboro Airport, Teterboro, New Jersey, United States; 40°49′46″N 74°03′37″W

Aircraft
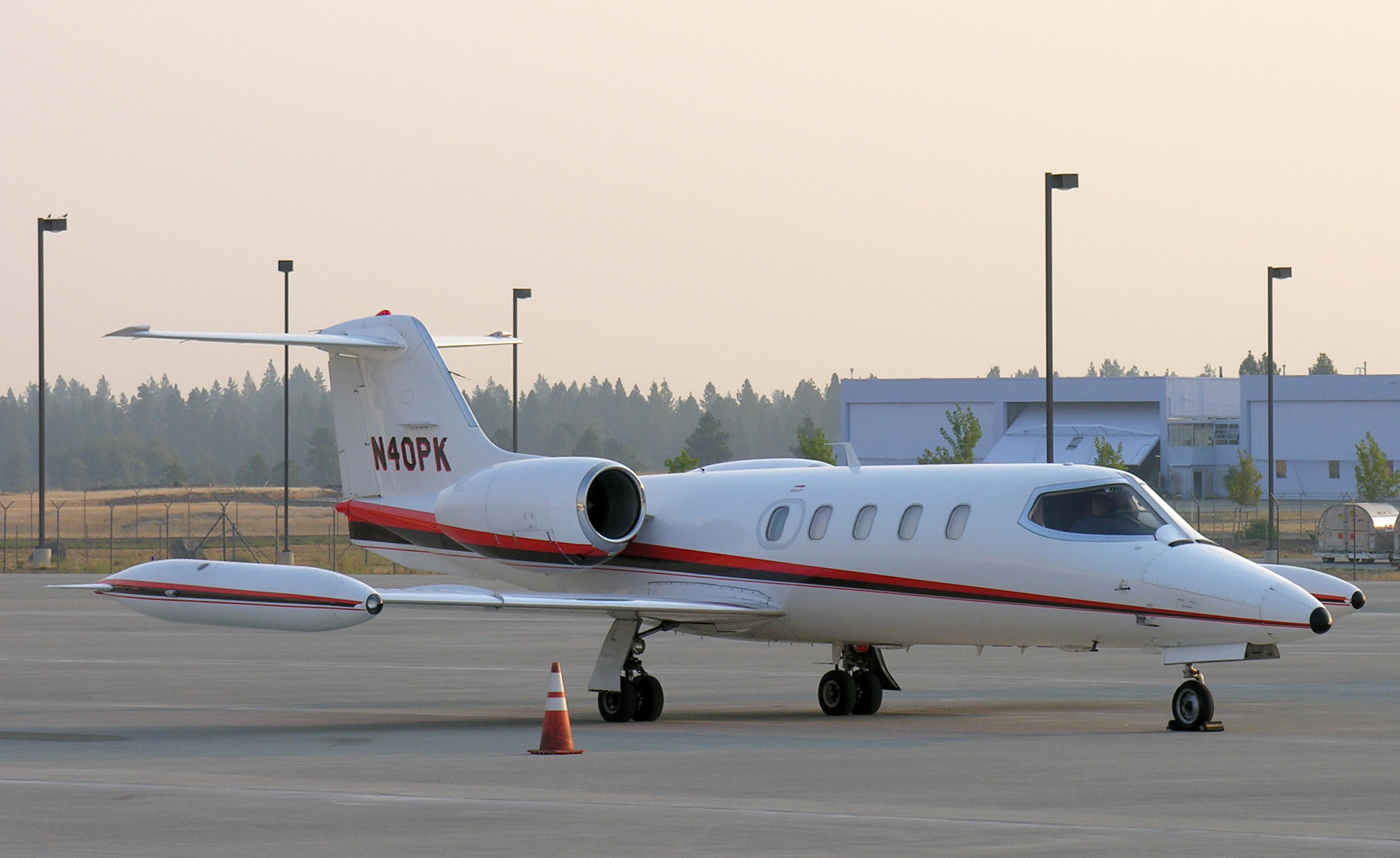
- A Learjet 35A similar to the accident aircraft
- Aircraft type: Learjet 35A
- Operator: Trans-Pacific Air Charter
- Call sign: NOVEMBER 452 DELTA ALPHA
- Registration: N452DA
- Flight origin: Philadelphia International Airport, Philadelphia, Pennsylvania, United States
- Destination: Teterboro Airport, Teterboro, New Jersey, United States
- Occupants: 2
- Crew: 2
- Fatalities: 2
- Survivors: 0

On May 15, 2017, a Learjet 35A business jet operated by Trans-Pacific Air Charter crashed while on approach to Teterboro Airport, killing both pilots, the only two occupants on board. The aircraft, flying a repositioning flight from Philadelphia International Airport in Philadelphia, Pennsylvania, to Teterboro Airport in Teterboro, New Jersey, was flying a circle-to-land approach to land on Runway 1 when it stalled and crashed into a commercial building and a parking lot.

The investigation, conducted by the National Transportation Safety Board, determined several factors that led to the crash. The captain of the flight allowed the underqualified first officer to be the pilot flying, which was directly against company procedures. Neither flight crew member conducted an approach briefing, which led to a loss of situation awareness and a failure to maintain proper altitude during the approach. During the circle-to-land maneuver — which was conducted on an unstabilized approach and not in guidance with air traffic control instructions – the captain was focused on aligning the aircraft with the runway rather than indications in the cockpit that showed the airspeed was too slow. This resulted in an aerodynamic stall at such a low altitude that the crew was unable to recover.

== Background ==
=== Operator ===
Trans-Pacific Air Charter was air charter owned by 38-year-old Ryan Allyn Frost and his father, Robert Frost, based in Honolulu. The airline was originally known as Sunquest Executive Air Charter, which recently had its Federal Aviation Administration (FAA) Air Operator Certificate revoked. Frost took over the company, reacquired an Air Operator Certificate, and renamed the company to Trans-Pacific Air Charter. The intent was to operate chartered transpacific flights with Learjets and Dassault Falcons. Frost was the director of operations, charter coordinator, safety officer, and spokesman of Trans-Pacific at the time of the accident.

Trans-Pacific had a system to classify first officers, using five different tiers. New first officers were rated as SIC-0, the lowest on the scale, and they were only allowed to act as pilot monitoring. First officers rated as SIC-2 or above would be able to act as pilot flying. The director of operations adopted this policy from a previous employer. SIC-0 first officers had to fly with a check airman to upgrade to a SIC-1. However, there was no check airmen at Trans-Pacific qualified to fly the Learjet 35A.

=== Aircraft ===
The aircraft involved in the accident was a 36-year-old Learjet 35A, with registration N452DA and manufacturer serial number 35A-452. It was powered by two Honeywell TFE-731 turbofan engines. The aircraft had a cockpit voice recorder (CVR), but did not have and was not required to carry a flight data recorder (FDR). The aircraft was registered to Montana-based A&C Big Sky Aviation, but was operated by Trans-Pacific Air Charter.

=== Crew ===
The aircraft was flown by two pilots. The captain and designated pilot-in-command (PIC) was 53-year-old William Eugene “Will” Ramsey. Ramsey had 6,898 flight hours, 353 of which were pilot-in-command on the Learjet 35A. He started flying as a second-in-command (SIC) for Utah-based company D&D Aviation, flying on the Learjet and Beechcraft 400. He worked as an SIC at the company from May 2006 to February 2009, but was laid off during the ongoing economic crisis for a "lack of work". In November 2015, D&D Aviation rehired Ramsey, but he only stayed with the company until December 2015 due to a failure to renew his contract. In October 2016, he completed a checkride and was able to fly for Trans-Pacific as a PIC. In February 2017, he got a new medical certificate and was required to wear corrective lenses.

The first officer and designated SIC was 33-year-old Jeffrey Alino. Alino had 1,167 flight hours, although only 265 were on the Learjet 35A. He had first worked at New Mexico-based MedFlight Air Ambulance in August 2015, but left only six months later. In September 2016, he was hired by Trans-Pacific. During a simulator training session, Alino's instructor noted several deficiencies in his performance, which included not knowing how to perform takeoff checks, not knowing how to start the engines, crashing on takeoff due to incorrect flight director settings, and crashing on landing during approach. He was graded as "Not Yet Proficient" and classified as an SIC-0.

== Flight ==
On May 15, 2017, N452DA was scheduled to fly three flights. The first flight was from Teterboro Airport in Teterboro, New Jersey to Hanscom Field in Bedford, Massachusetts. The second flight was from Hanscom Field to Philadelphia International Airport in Philadelphia, which carried three passengers. The plan for the passengers was to continue to fly on the same aircraft on its third flight, from Philadelphia Airport to Teterboro Airport, but after the aircraft fishtailed hard on landing, they decided to drive up to Teterboro rather than fly. The pilots were not required to fly to Teterboro as a result, but decided that they would stay in a hotel in New York rather than in Philadelphia.

Teterboro Airport has two runways, Runway 1/19 and 6/24. Under normal wind conditions, aircraft would fly into the headwind and land on Runway 6. On May 15, however, the wind was coming from the northwest, which resulted in favorable conditions for landing on Runway 1. Due to other international airports in the path of Runway 1, aircraft planning to land on the runway were to do a circle-to-land approach. This approach involves using the instrument landing system (ILS) signal for Runway 6, then deviating from course around MetLife Stadium to line up for Runway 1.

=== Accident ===
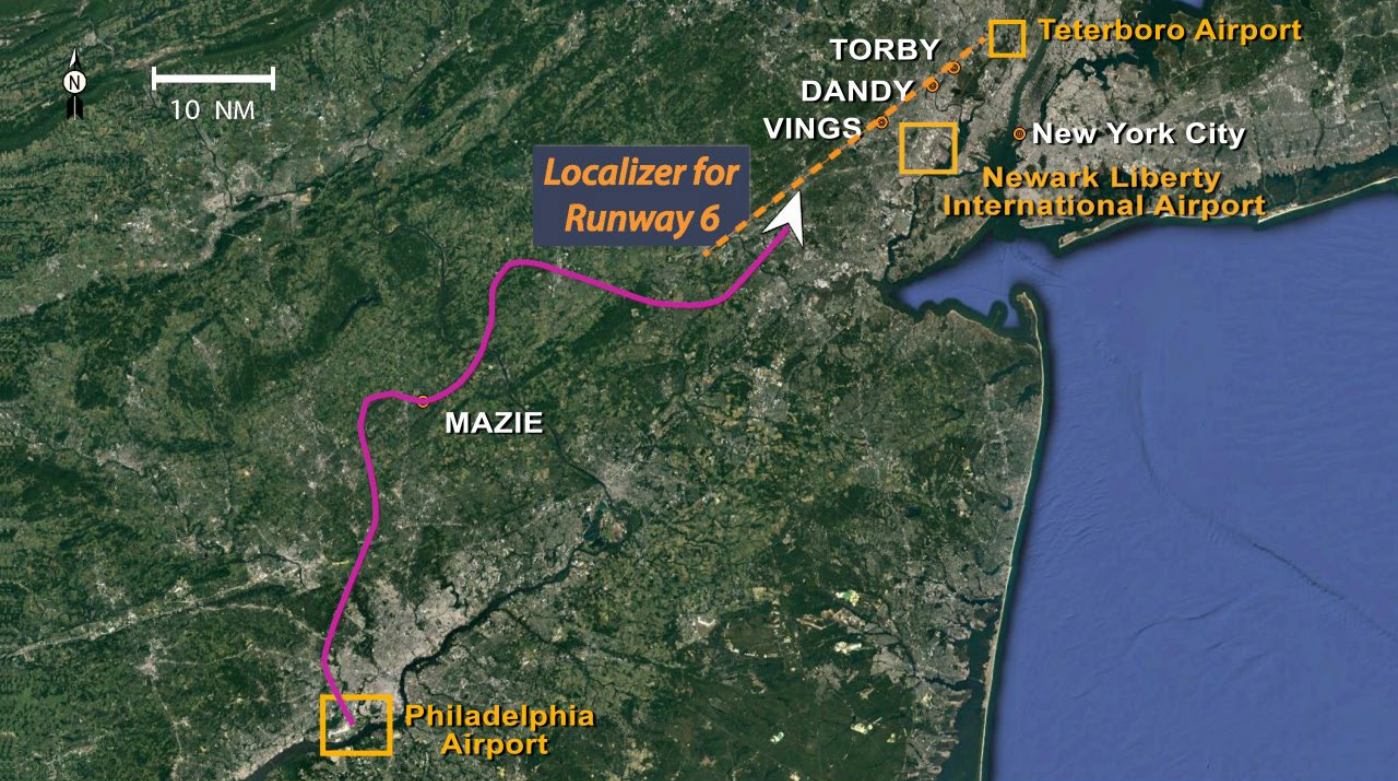
The flight path of N452DA, with various waypoints, the localizer for Runway 6 at Teterboro, and Philadelphia, Newark Liberty and Teterboro Airports marked

Captain Ramsey filed an instrument flight rules (IFR) flight plan from Philadelphia to Teterboro at 14:15, (Note: All times are listed in Eastern Daylight Time, UTC−04:00) with a planned en route time of 28 minutes and a cruising altitude of 27,000 ft (8,200 m). (Note: All altitudes are listed as above mean sea level) This planned altitude was determined to be inappropriate for such a short flight. Additionally, this was the only preflight preparation that either flight crew member conducted, as the weather briefing was conducted before the first flight of the day. At 14:33, the crew contacted clearance delivery for Philadelphia, who gave the flight's prescribed clearance with the exception of the planned altitude, with the controller giving the flight an altitude of 4,000 ft (1,200 m) 10 minutes after departure. At 15:00:51, the captain said to the first officer, "okay I think we're next man. hand on your yoke," giving control of the flight to the first officer. As First Officer Alino was rated as an SIC-0, he was not allowed to be the pilot flying, and Captain Ramsey giving the controls over to him was a violation of standard operating procedures. Four minutes later, N452DA was cleared for takeoff. The aircraft climbed through 2,000 ft (610 m) safely and contacted Philadelphia approach control soon afterward, where it was cleared to climb and level off at 4,000 ft (1,200 m).

At 15:06, air traffic control (ATC) cleared the aircraft to take a shortcut to waypoint MAZIE. Shortly after, the captain instructed the first officer to control basic flight parameters, including altitude and airspeed. Ramsey told Alino to "keep us below two fifty," instructing him to keep the airspeed below 250 kn (290 mph), the limit for aircraft flying below 10,000 ft (3,000 m). However, they exceeded that speed, and when ATC asked, "N452DA, what's your airspeed?" Ramsey admitted that they were flying at 260 kn (300 mph) and that they violated the speed limit. At 15:12, he asked ATC if they could climb any higher, but ATC replied, "unable higher, I would have to spin you back around and sequence you with the rest of the traffic goin' into Teterboro." The first officer commented on this by saying to the captain, "it's like she doesn't like us," with the captain replying, "she's a # idiot. get us someone else if she can't do it." (Note: A hastag indicates an expletive in the published CVR transcript)

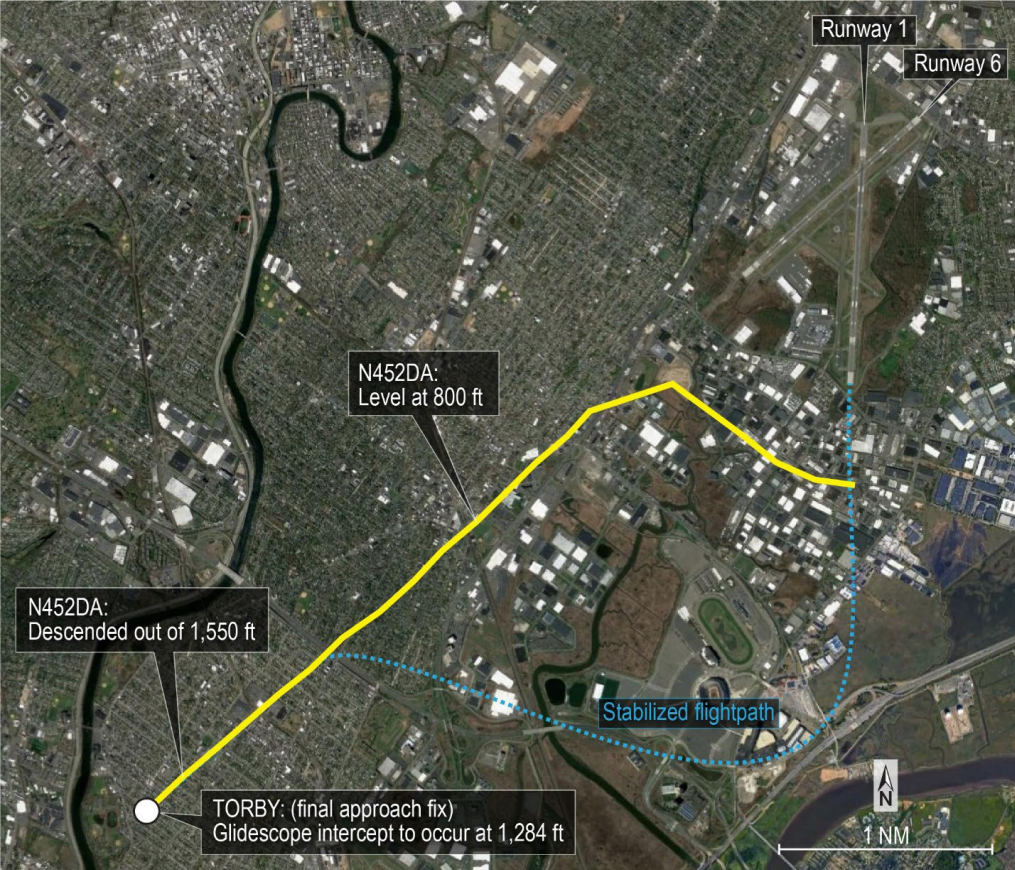
The approach path of N452DA compared to a stable approach path

The crew contacted New York approach control at 15:14, where they were given instructions to line up with the ILS for Runway 6 to circle-to-land on Runway 1. After asking ATC to repeat the altimeter setting, Captain Ramsey expressed shock and confusion about the instructions ATC gave them. "What the # are they doing man? circling six?" he said in the cockpit to Alino, followed by, "he was saying circling # six or something. I don't know what the # they thinkin' we're doin'. we're # hundreds of miles away man." This was an incorrect statement by the captain, as when he made this comment to the first officer, the aircraft was only 48 nmi (55 mi) away from Teterboro. A minute later, he realized their true distance to the airport and said, "we're # gonna be there in ten minutes. I gotta get the # ATIS #. I didn't realize we're that # close." The crew tuned into the ATIS frequency, but turned it off after only acknowledging the altimeter setting.

At 15:19:17, ATC instructed the crew to fly on a heading 90° to intercept the localizer for Runway 6. The aircraft turned on that heading but flew through the localizer course at 15:20:20. Soon after, First Officer Alino reported to the captain that he had the runway in sight. However, he was looking at Newark Liberty International Airport and not Teterboro. ATC reminded the crew to intercept the localizer, to which Captain Ramsey acknowledged. However, in the cockpit, he and the first officer expressed confusion about where Teterboro truly was. Within a minute, they realized that they were seeing Newark rather than Teterboro, with Alino commenting, "Yeah that was Newark. That was Newark. I thought that was Teterboro." After they properly intercepted the localizer for Runway 6, Ramsey continued to instruct Alino on how to manage the engine power levers and the airspeed.

Whilst setting up the flight management system (FMS), ATC instructed the crew to fly to VINGS, a waypoint on the localizer path for Runway 6. The captain entered VINGS into the FMS and while he was doing so, the first officer tried to tell the captain to take over the controls for him, but no handover of controls took place. The captain said, "you still got the localizer on your side so we're doin' good." The first officer responded with, "alright. I don't wanna # up." ATC then instructed the aircraft to slow down to 180 kn (210 mph) from 240 kn (280 mph) and to descend at 15:23. While the crew did slow down the aircraft, they did not descend and as a consequence, they remained above the glideslope.

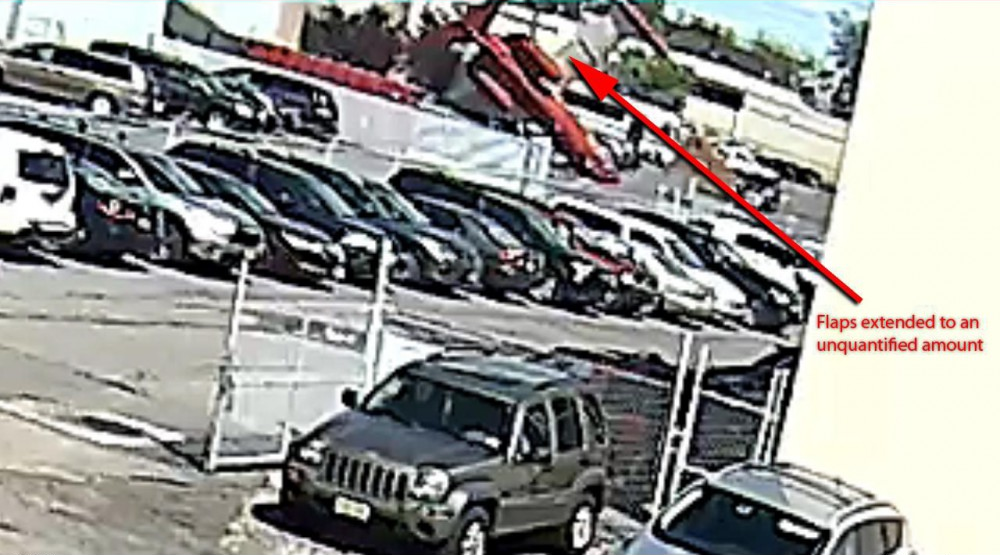
Still image from security camera footage showing N452DA just as the nose makes impact

At 15:26, ATC gave three instructions to the flight crew of N452DA: contact Teterboro tower, cross waypoint DANDY at 1,500 ft (460 m), and begin the circle-to-land maneuver at waypoint TORBY. Captain Ramsey acknowledged these instructions but failed to comply with any of them. He did not make First Officer Alino descend to 1,500 ft (460 m) and they kept flying at 2,050 ft (620 m). Once they passed DANDY, the autopilot failed to capture the glideslope signal as their altitude was too high. After passing DANDY, Ramsey told Alino to follow the glideslope but not descend below 1,500 ft (460 m). This was above the approach height for the path between DANDY and TORBY of 1,300 ft (400 m), so the aircraft remained above the glideslope. The crew only contacted Teterboro tower after being reminded to do so again by ATC. The aircraft passed TORBY at 1,500 ft (460 m) and instead of starting the circle-to-land maneuver, it continued to fly towards Runway 6. At 15:29:07 while descending to 700 ft (210 m), ATC asked the crew, "you gonna start that turn?" Despite being only 1 nmi (1.2 mi) from the start of Runway 6, too close to start and complete the circle-to-land maneuver safely, Captain Ramsey simply replied, "yeah sir we're doin' it right now."

Captain Ramsey directed First Officer Alino to start a right turn as part of the circle-to-land maneuver, in which the aircraft descended from 650 ft (200 m) to 350 ft (110 m). The first officer tried to tell the captain in the turn, "your flight controls," but the captain did not respond. Soon after at 15:29:18, the enhanced ground proximity warning system (EGPWS) issued an aural "five hundred" feet altitude alert, followed three seconds later by "sink rate, pull up!" First Officer Alino soon gave control of the flight to Captain Ramsey, to which Ramsey acknowledged and assumed control. He told Alino to watch the airspeed, which was decreasing as the aircraft entered a left turn. As the bank angle of the aircraft increased, the wings started to produce less lift and the airspeed of the aircraft started to decrease. The first officer called out, "V-ref," indicating that the aircraft's speed was falling below the landing reference speed. He followed this call with, "add airspeed, airspeed, airspeed, airspeed." At this time, the bank angle had increased to 35° to the left and the airspeed had fallen to 111 kn (128 mph). Captain Ramsey announced, "stall," to which First Officer replied, "yup." The EGPWS once again issued a "sink rate, pull up!" warning as the right wing stalled. The aircraft went into an inverted attitude as it rapidly rolled to the right. The right wingtip of the aircraft impacted a commercial building which was shortly followed by N452DA crashing into a parking lot. The wreckage of the aircraft was distributed along a 315 ft (96 m) long debris path 0.43 nmi (0.49 mi) south of Runway 1, which damaged or destroyed three buildings and sixteen vehicles. Both pilots were killed on impact.

== Investigation ==
The investigation into the crash was conducted by the National Transportation Safety Board (NTSB).

=== Crew's actions during flight ===
The NTSB discovered that multiple times throughout the flight, Captain Ramsey coached First Officer Alino on maintaining basic skills of flight. This task, which was non-standard and against policy at Trans-Pacific, degraded the captain's situational awareness of the flight. This was shown through the captain's lack of awareness of where the destination was. The NTSB deemed that his pre-flight selection of a cruising altitude of 27,000 ft (8,200 m) was inappropriate for a 28-minute flight. The NTSB noted that his failure to notice the aircraft's true distance to Teterboro during the flight showed.

The NTSB highlighted the flight crew's failure to conduct proper pre-flight briefings. Policy at Trans-Pacific required the PIC include planned routing, navigation aids, approach briefing, and en route weather in a pre-flight briefing before every flight. However, the only evidence of any pre-flight planning was the IFR flight plan filed by Captain Ramsey before the flight. The investigators determined that the lack of proper planning contributed to mistakes made by the pilots in-flight. The NTSB determined that the crew's confused reaction to being given a circle-to-land approach and their failure to clarify this instruction with the controller would likely have been prevented if they conducted a proper pre-flight briefing. These errors resulted in the crew's failure to stay on the proper approach path during the descent. The NTSB deemed that the crew's failure to verify what type of approach they would be conducting resulted in confusion and several errors that led to them not starting the circle-to-land maneuver on time. Captain Ramsey also showed a lack of professionalism; on the 30-minute CVR transcript, there were a total of 131 expletives, or one every 14 seconds.

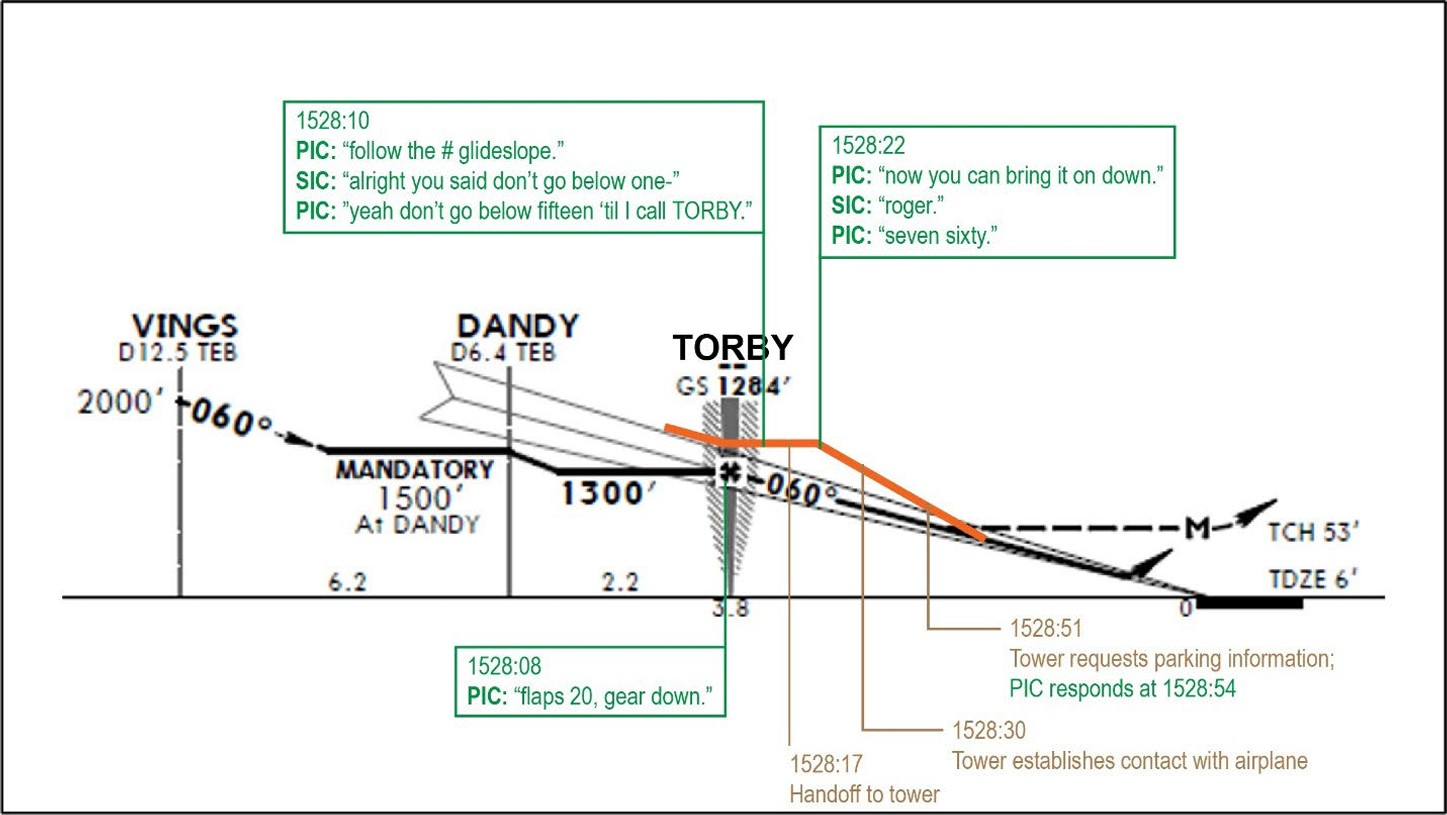
Vertical profile of the aircraft's altitude (orange) compared to the minimum descent altitude (black)

During the circle-to-land maneuver, the NTSB determined that pilots disregarded multiple warnings from the EGPWS and the angle of attack (AOA) indicator inside the cockpit. If they listened to these warnings, they would have realized that their approach was unstable and conducted a go-around. Their decision to start the maneuver was also deemed inappropriate by the NTSB. Captain Ramsey's decision to continue the approach rather was unsafe as they were not on a stabilized approach. After First Officer Alino successfully transferred controls to Ramsey, the NTSB believed that Ramsey became focused on lining up the aircraft with the runway visually, ignored calls from the EGPWS and the first officer, and did not look at the AOA indicator. The NTSB concluded that his focus on attempting to align the aircraft with the runway distracted him from keeping the airspeed of the aircraft stable, which resulted in a stall.

=== Trans-Pacific's operations and oversight ===
The pilot's lack of adherence to standard operating procedures (SOPs) was also addressed in the final report. Commenting on three accidents that occurred between 2014 and 2016 that also involved violations of SOPs, (Note: The 2014 Bedford Gulfstream IV crash, Execuflight Flight 1526, and Ravn Connect Flight 3153) the NTSB showed that Trans-Pacific, along with FAR part 135 operators in general, did not have the proper resources to monitor and detect pilots that have deficiencies. The lack of a flight data monitoring (FDM) method was pointed out as a reason for Trans-Pacific's failure to properly monitor Captain Ramsey's and First Officer Alino's performance. At the time of the crash, Trans-Pacific did not have an FDM or any formal safety programs to report poor pilot performance. Their safety management system (SMS) was deemed incomplete by the NTSB and did not properly identify and mitigate potential hazards, such as pairing two inexperienced pilots together. The company lacking the safety assurance component of their SMS meant that they did not identify that SIC-0 first officers could not advance according to policy. The disregard of SOPs during the flight was also attributed to Trans-Pacific's improper crew resource management (CRM) training. Their CRM training consisted of a 27-slide computer presentation which covered all topics required by the FAA to some extent. The NTSB determined that the materials in the presentation did not describe the effects of planning, briefing, and decision-making on workload and time management or the responsibilities of the PIC as a leader.

The NTSB also pointed out the FAA's failure to maintain proper oversight of Trans-Pacific. The principal operations inspector at the FAA responsible for Trans-Pacific stated that he had little first-hand knowledge with its operations and that he had never done a logistical inspection of any FAR part 135 operations. As a result, he was unaware if pilots at the companies he was responsible for were following SOPs. The NTSB determined that proper oversight of Trans-Pacific would have helped to identify problems within the company. Additionally, ineffective safety assurance systems within the FAA did not identify operators that had violations of SOPs.

Trans-Pacific's policy in regard to SICs was criticized by the NTSB. The inability for SICs to develop pilot flying skills resulted in SICs at the company having a lack of experience. The lack of any check airmen to oversee Learjet SICs was highlighted as a factor that reduced the ability to discover noncompliance to SOPs. The NTSB concluded that proper staffing at Trans-Pacific would have identified issues with SICs sooner and would have allowed them to gain experience in line with company policies.

=== Final report ===
In their final report, the NTSB determined that the probable cause of the crash was:

The probable cause of this accident was the pilot-in-command’s (PIC) attempt to salvage an unstabilized visual approach, which resulted in an aerodynamic stall at low altitude. Contributing to the accident was the PIC’s decision to allow an unapproved second-in-command to act as pilot flying, the PIC’s inadequate and incomplete preflight planning, and the flight crew’s lack of an approach briefing. Also contributing to the accident were Trans-Pacific Jets’ lack of safety programs that would have enabled the company to identify and correct patterns of poor performance and procedural noncompliance and the Federal Aviation Administration’s ineffective safety assurance system procedures, which failed to identify these company oversight deficiencies.

== Aftermath ==
In July 2018, a company who had property significantly damaged by the crash filed a lawsuit against Trans-Pacific and A&C Big Sky Aviation. They claimed US$15,000 (equivalent to $19,200 in 2025) in damages "due to the carelessness, negligence and recklessness" that resulted in the crash.

== See also ==
- Midwest Express Airlines Flight 105 (1985) – Accident involving improper FAA oversight
- Airblue Flight 202 (2010) – Crashed during an improper circling maneuver on approach
