= Heber City Municipal Airport =

Heber City Municipal Airport Russ McDonald Field
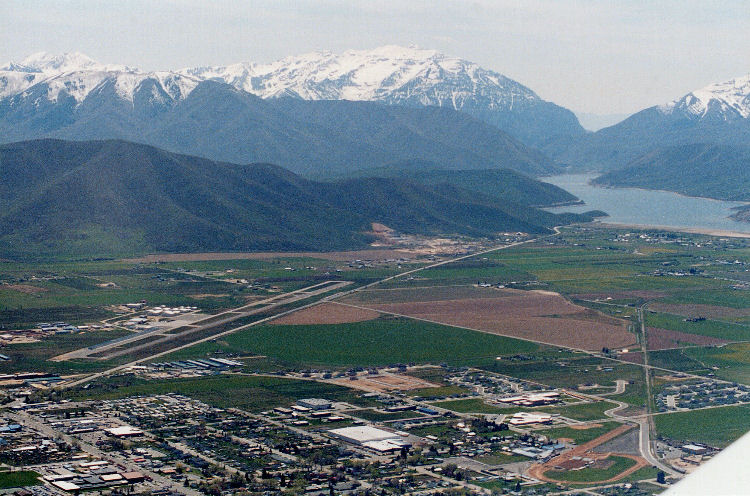
- Heber valley, with the airport visible in the left portion of the valley
- IATA: none; ICAO: KHCR; FAA LID: HCR

Summary
- Airport type: Public
- Owner: Heber City
- Serves: Heber City, Utah
- Elevation AMSL: 5,637 ft (1,718 m)
- Coordinates: 40°28′54″N 111°25′44″W
- Website: RussMcDonaldField
- Interactive map of Heber City Municipal Airport

Runways
Direction	Length		Surface
Direction	ft	m	Surface
4/22	6,899	2,103	Asphalt

Statistics (2008)
- Aircraft operations: 28,302
- Based aircraft: 96
- Source: Federal Aviation Administration

Heber City Municipal Airport (ICAO: KHCR, FAA LID: HCR), also known as Russ McDonald Field, is a city-owned, public-use airport located 1 mi (2 km) south of Heber City, in Wasatch County, Utah, United States, east of Salt Lake City. The airport is untowered and was activated in November 1947. It is included in the National Plan of Integrated Airport Systems for 2011–2015, which categorized it as a general aviation facility.

== Facilities and aircraft ==
Heber City Municipal Airport covers an area of 401 acres (162 ha) at an elevation of 5,637 feet (1,718 m). It has one runway designated 4/22 with an asphalt surface measuring 6,899 by 75 feet with a PCN rating of 32/F/B/X/T .

Since 1986 the airport has received over $17 million in federal grant funds for development and improvements from the FAA's Airport and Airway Trust Fund.

For the 12-month period ending December 31, 2008, the airport had 28,302 aircraft operations, an average of 77 per day: 94% general aviation, 5% air taxi, and less than 1% military. At that time there were 96 aircraft based at this airport: 69% single-engine, 6% multi-engine, 6% jet, 3% helicopter, and 16% glider.

The airport has been cited since 2016 by the Aircraft Owners and Pilots Association as an airfield that has egregious prices and fees. AOPA has asked the city of Heber to increase business competition at the airport by allowing additional fixed-base operators at the airport. However, the Heber City Council voted to revert to 2016 airport minimum standards and suspend consideration of a new FBO and self-service fuel until completion of a new airport master plan.

== Airline and destinations ==
=== Passenger ===
Airlines	Destinations
Aero	Charter: Los Angeles–Van Nuys

== See also ==
- List of airports in Utah
