= Teterboro station =

NJ Transit rail station

Teterboro
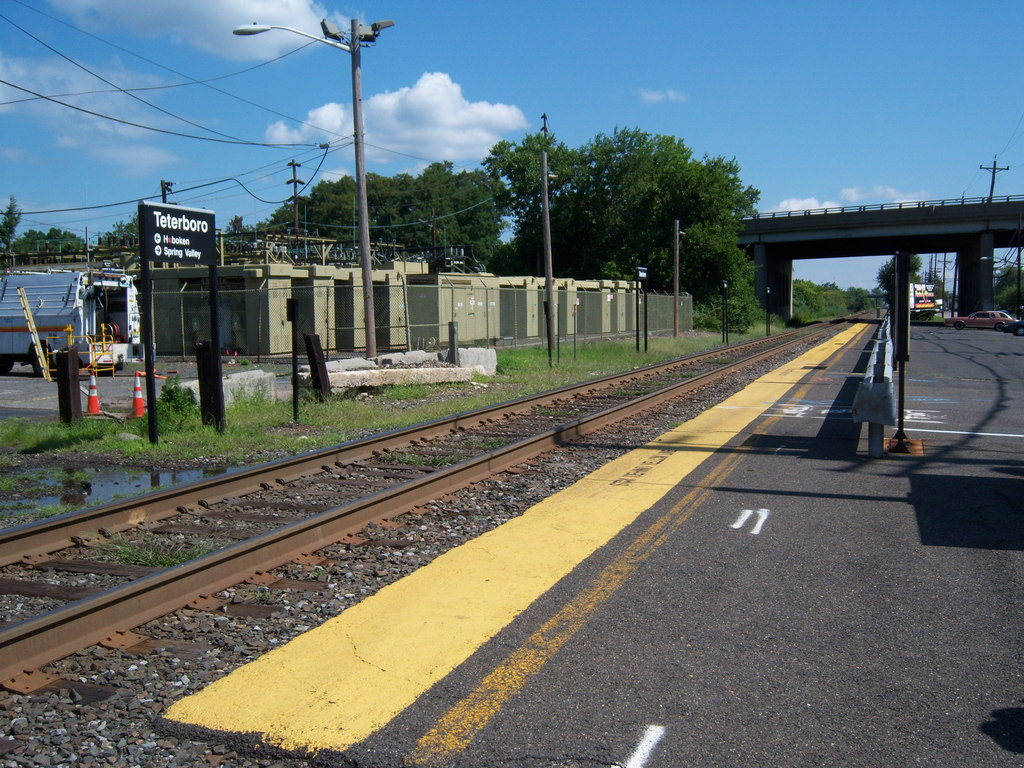
- Teterboro station in August 2008

General information
- Location: Green Street at U.S. Route 46, Hasbrouck Heights, New Jersey
- Coordinates: 40.8648°N 74.0628°W
- Owner: NJ Transit
- Platforms: 1 side platform
- Tracks: 1

Other information
- Station code: 767 (Erie Railroad)
- Fare zone: 4

History
- Opened: May 29, 1904
- Rebuilt: 1967
- Former names: Williams Avenue

Key dates
- July 10, 1916: Station depot burned

Passengers
- 2025: 90 (average weekday)
- Rank: 122 of 153

Services
Preceding station	NJ Transit	Following station
Essex Street toward Spring Valley	Pascack Valley Line	Wood-Ridge toward Hoboken
Former services
Preceding station	Erie Railroad	Following station
Hackensack toward Haverstraw	New Jersey and New York Railroad	Hasbrouck Heights toward Jersey City
Lodi Terminus	Lodi Branch	Terminus
Location

Teterboro is a commuter railroad station for NJ Transit in the borough of Hasbrouck Heights, Bergen County, New Jersey, United States. Located on Green Street in Hasbrouck Heights at the end of the U.S. Route 46 eastbound ramp to Catherine Street, the station services trains of NJ Transit's Pascack Valley Line. The station sits a couple blocks west of Teterboro Airport, operated by Port Authority of New York and New Jersey. Teterboro station has one low-level side platform with a shelter.

The station opened on the Erie Railroad's New Jersey and New York Railroad Division on May 29, 1904, as Williams Avenue, named after the street in Hasbrouck Heights that used to cross at the station. The station was one of two in Hasbrouck Heights, with the other station at Malcolm Avenue. The namesake street, Williams Avenue, was cut off at the railroad tracks in August 1934. The station depot built at Williams Avenue burned on July 10, 1916 and was replaced by an abandoned freight car to use as temporary structure. This would be replaced by an old passenger coach, which was in use through World War I.

In 1967, as part of consolidation efforts, the railroad closed the Hasbrouck Heights station and demolished it due to construction of Route 17. Under NJ Transit, Teterboro had no weekend service, with the exception of one late night outbound local train from Hoboken. However, on November 8, 2020, NJ Transit introduced full weekend service.

== History ==
Around 5:00 p.m. on June 10, 1916, the station depot at Williams Avenue caught fire. By the time the Hasbrouck Heights Fire Department had arrived, much of the station was already consumed by fire. Due to limited hydrant locations in Hasbrouck Heights, the closest spot to access water was 0.3-mile (0.48 km) away at Terrace Avenue. The Hasbrouck Heights Fire Department left their equipment on Terrace Avenue and grabbed hand extinguishers to put out the station fire. This approach did not work in reducing the fire, requiring the brigade to run back to Terrace Avenue and pump water from a hose to put the fire out. The Hackensack Fire Department also arrived at the fire on the request of the Erie Railroad and helped pump water from a nearby ditch to quell the fire. The station was a total loss once the flames were put out. The fire damage ruined the telegraph and telephone communications along the New Jersey and New York Railroad line. Authorities considered that the station fire was a case of arson rather than accidental.

Rumors were immediate that the Erie Railroad was already considering closing the Williams Avenue station and not rebuild the station depot after the fire. The railroad replaced the burned out structure with a box car to serve as a station depot by June 20. However, by June 29, it was reported that the Erie Railroad had interest in building a new station without any delays. Plans for a full station were drawn up for the railroad by July 22. Rumors were the station depot would be more attractive than the former station that caught fire. While rumors broke that the Erie Railroad would begin construction of the new station soon after August 23, no construction began. In May 1917, the railroad informed the borough that the construction could not begin because of World War I.

The borough of Hasbrouck Heights appealed to the Board of Public Utility Commissioners in 1917 to force the Erie Railroad to build an adequate structure at Williams Avenue station. The railroad contested that the station, due to its low ridership, had the passenger coach, that replaced the old box car, which would be sufficient for riders. The Board tossed Hasbrouck Heights' appeal in January 1918, stating that with World War I going on, they should appeal again under more normal circumstances. However, the Board also dismissed the Erie Railroad's petition to not have to build one at all, stating that the railroad must maintain an agent at Williams Avenue station. They added that the area around the station was growing, and there was no sign of declining ridership.

== Station layout ==
The station has one track and one low-level side platform four cars long to its east. Although it was formerly named Williams Avenue, that street dead-ends on the line on the opposite side of the platform (since August 17, 1934) which can only be accessed by Green Street that runs alongside it. Since there is no way to reach the station from its west side, customers from there, often illegally, crossed the tracks from the Williams Avenue dead end to reach the platform. In February 2013, New Jersey Transit built a barbed-wire fence on this dead end, forcing riders from the west side to loop around the station through Route 46 and Route 17, neither of which have sidewalks, to reach it.

The platform has a wide painted yellow line below track level and a silver highway guard rail (with gaps to enter it) separating it from the 27-space parking lot that is in between it and Green Street. The southern end of the platform in the tiny area south of the parking lot's end has a bike rack for two behind a single wooden bench. There is a tiny silver shelter that has another bench next to the station's only ticket vending machine.
