= Van Nuys Airport =

Airport in Van Nuys, Los Angeles, California, U.S.

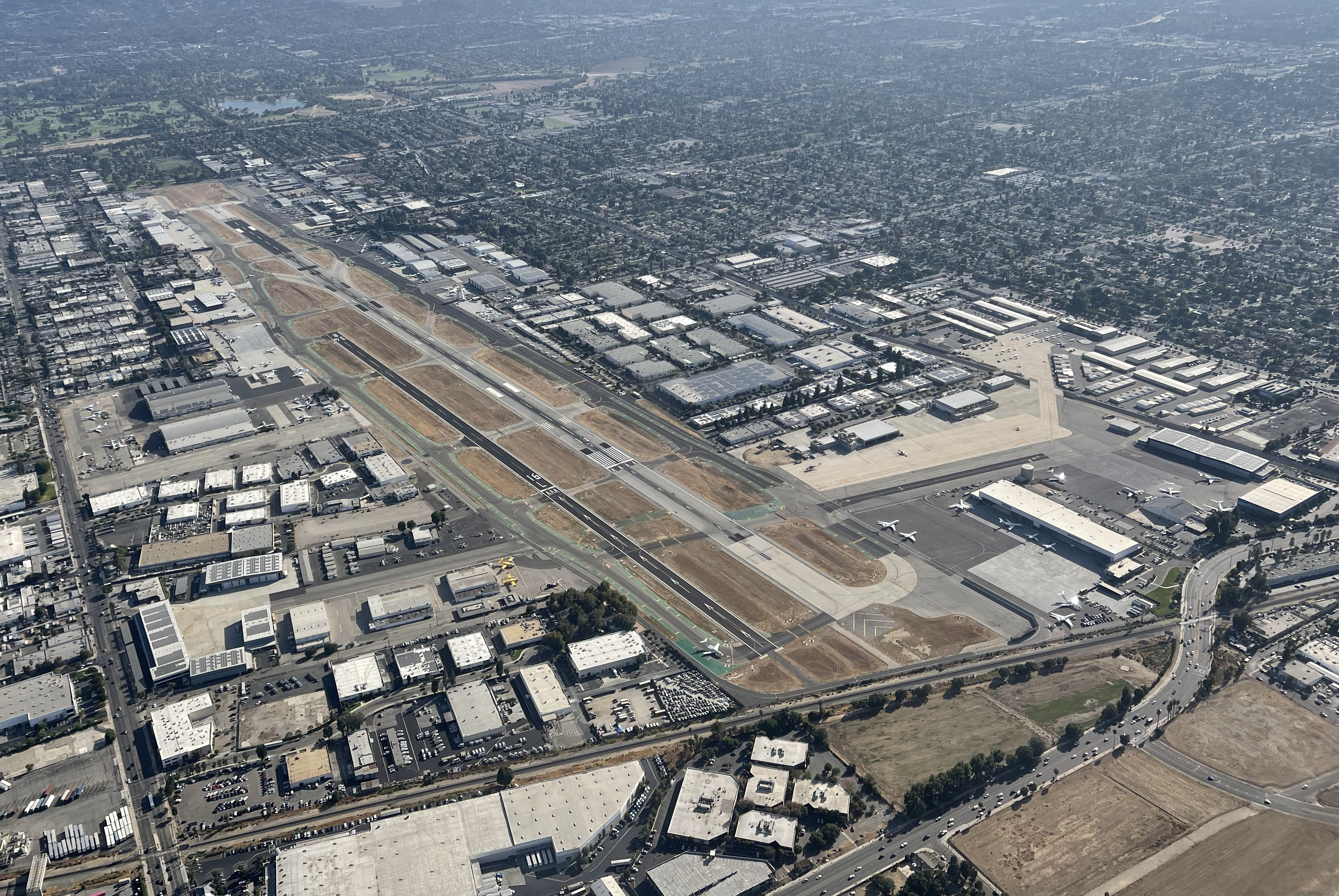
- Aerial view in 2021
- IATA: VNY; ICAO: KVNY; FAA LID: VNY

Summary
- Airport type: Public
- Owner: City of Los Angeles
- Operator: Los Angeles World Airports
- Serves: Greater Los Angeles
- Location: Van Nuys, California, U.S.
- Opened: December 17, 1928; 97 years ago
- Operating base for: Aero
- Elevation AMSL: 244 m (801 ft)
- Coordinates: 34°12′35″N 118°29′24″W
- Website: iflyvny.com

Maps
- FAA airport diagram

- Location VNY (California) VNY (the United States) VNY (North America)
- Interactive map of Van Nuys Airport

Runways
Direction	Length		Surface
Direction	m	ft	Surface
16R/34L	2,439	8,001	Asphalt
16L/34R	1,223	4,013	Asphalt

Statistics
- Aircraft operations (2020): 232,000
- Economic impact (2015): US$2 billion
- Social impact (2015): 10,480 jobs

Van Nuys Airport (IATA: VNY, ICAO: KVNY, FAA LID: VNY) is a public airport in the Van Nuys neighborhood of Los Angeles, California. The airport is operated by Los Angeles World Airports (LAWA), a branch of the Los Angeles city government, which also operates Los Angeles International Airport (LAX). Van Nuys is one of the busiest general aviation airports in the world, with the airport's two parallel runways averaging over 230,000 takeoffs and landings annually.

Van Nuys is home to news, medical transport, and tour helicopter operators, the air operations unit of the Los Angeles City Fire Department, and a maintenance base for Los Angeles Police Department and Los Angeles Department of Water and Power helicopters.

Originally opened as Metropolitan Airport on December 17, 1928, the airport became the Van Nuys Army Air Field during World War II, was renamed the San Fernando Valley Airport after the war, before taking its current name in 1957.

The airport is also home to LAWA's FlyAway terminal, where passengers bound for LAX can park and board buses that run nonstop between Van Nuys and LAX.

Van Nuys Airport has multiple noise abatement policies and strategies which includes awarding jet operators with the Friendly Flyer Award for reduced noise.

== History ==
Van Nuys Airport opened on December 17, 1928, the 25th anniversary of the Wright Brothers' first flight, as Metropolitan Airport. The airfield was run by a small group of citizens who established a corporation. The airport was spread out on 80 acres, surrounded by trees and farmland. The airport was mostly used for general aviation, but also became popular with Hollywood stars of the era, and notably was the filming location of the iconic airport scene in the 1942 film Casablanca. Also notable were the scenes of the reckless flight (and other scenes) of Laurel and Hardy in the 1939 film The Flying Deuces.

In 1942, after the United States entered World War II, the government purchased Metropolitan Airport and converted it into the Van Nuys Army Air Field. The Army also purchased an additional 163 acres of land to expand the runways and airfield. During the war, the airfield was used by the 4th Air Force, which stationed the 428th Fighter Squadron with Lockheed P-38 Lightning aircraft in 1943. In 1944, the 441st Army Air Forces Base Unit was added to train additional pilots for the P-38. Elsewhere on the airfield, the U.S. Navy and Lockheed Corporation created an aircraft modification facility known as the Navy Lockheed Plant, just one of several aircraft companies that would become established in the area.

In 1949, after the war, the City of Los Angeles purchased the airport from the War Assets Administration for $1, with the agreement that a California Air National Guard base continue to operate at the site. The name of the airport, which by then covered 400 acres, was changed to San Fernando Valley Airport.

In the 1950s, the California Air National Guard based North American F-86 Sabre jets at the airport and built new permanent facilities. In 1957, the airport's name would change one last time to Van Nuys Airport. In 1959, the Sherman Way underpass was finished, allowing the main runway (16R/34L) to be extended to its current length of 8,001 feet (2,439 m). By the end of the decade, Van Nuys was ranked as the 25th busiest airport in the nation in terms of operations, despite having no commercial air service.

In 1975, the Los Angeles Department of Airports (today Los Angeles World Airports) built the FlyAway bus terminal just east of the Van Nuys Airport. The terminal served as a remote parking lot for sister airport, LAX. Passengers would park at Van Nuys and board a bus for a 20-mile (32 km) trip to LAX, helping to alleviate freeway and LAX parking congestion.

The California Air National Guard moved out of Van Nuys in 1990, with the 146th Airlift Wing shifting to Naval Air Station Point Mugu (now Naval Base Ventura County) in Oxnard. In 1994, the now-vacated National Guard buildings became a critical operating site for the American Red Cross helping victims of the devastating Northridge earthquake. In the early 2000s, the facility was converted into air operations and helicopter maintenance facilities for the Los Angeles Fire Department.

In the 2020s Van Nuys remains one of the world's busiest general aviation airports, with 232,000 aircraft operations in 2020. A 2015 study found that the airport generates US$2 billion of economic impact and has created 10,480 jobs

On January 27, 2026, the chair of the National Transportation Safety Board voiced alarm about a potential mid-air collision that could happen between flights at Van Nuys Airport and Burbank Airport, given the mixing of commercial, private, and helicopter traffic.

== Facilities ==
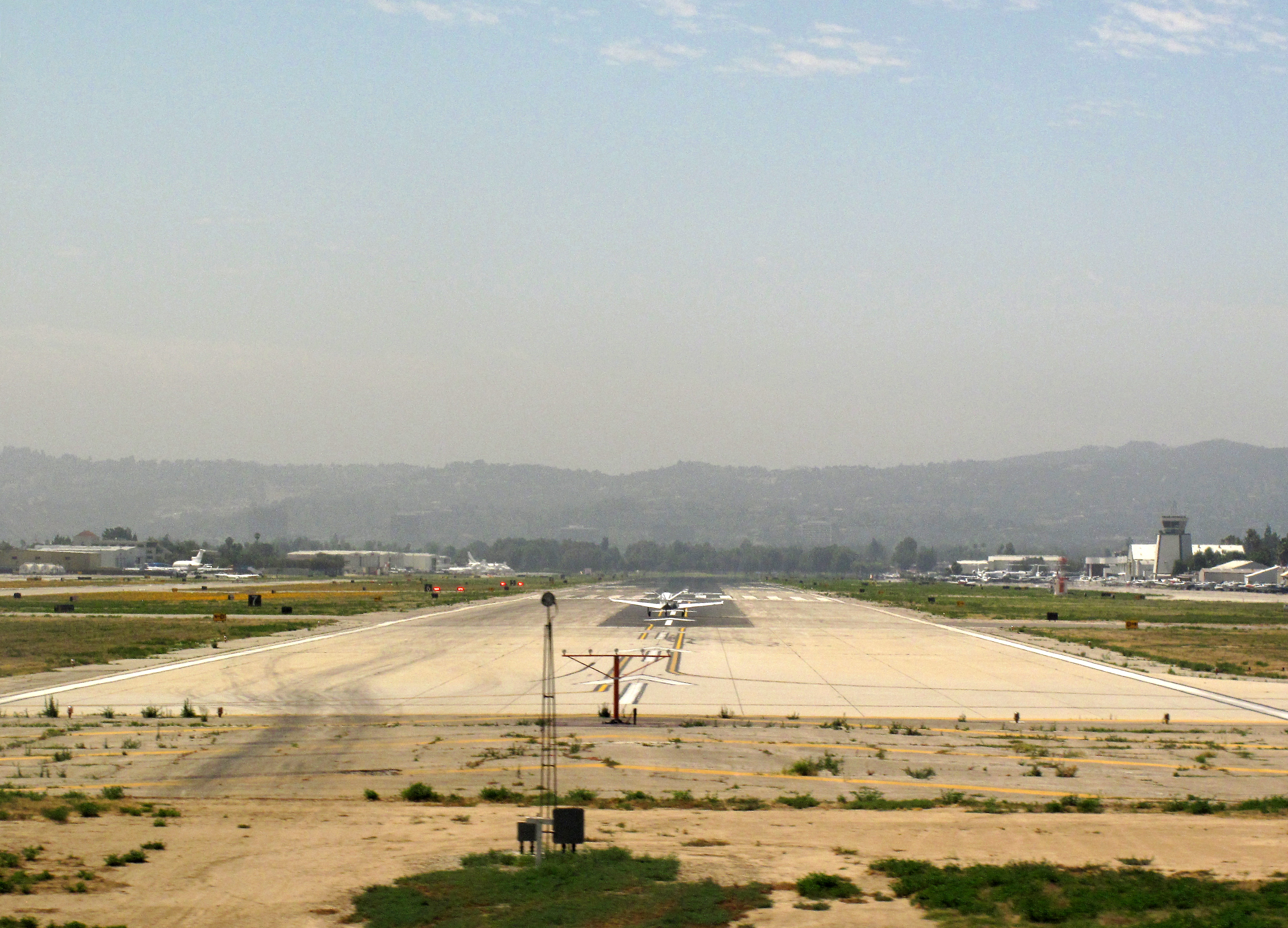
Runway 16R, Van Nuys

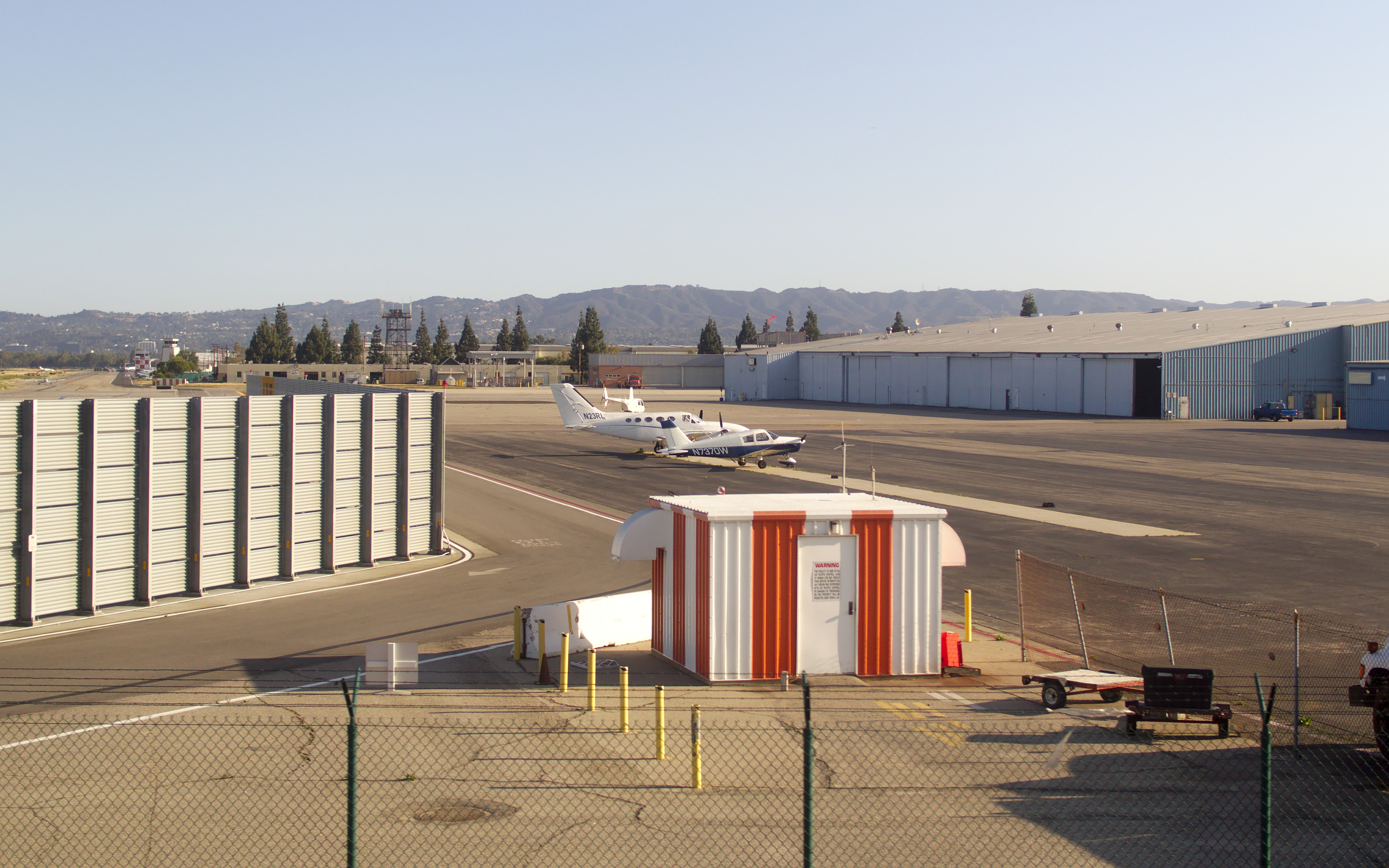
Viewed from the rail line to the north

Van Nuys Airport covers 725 acres (293 ha) and has two runways:

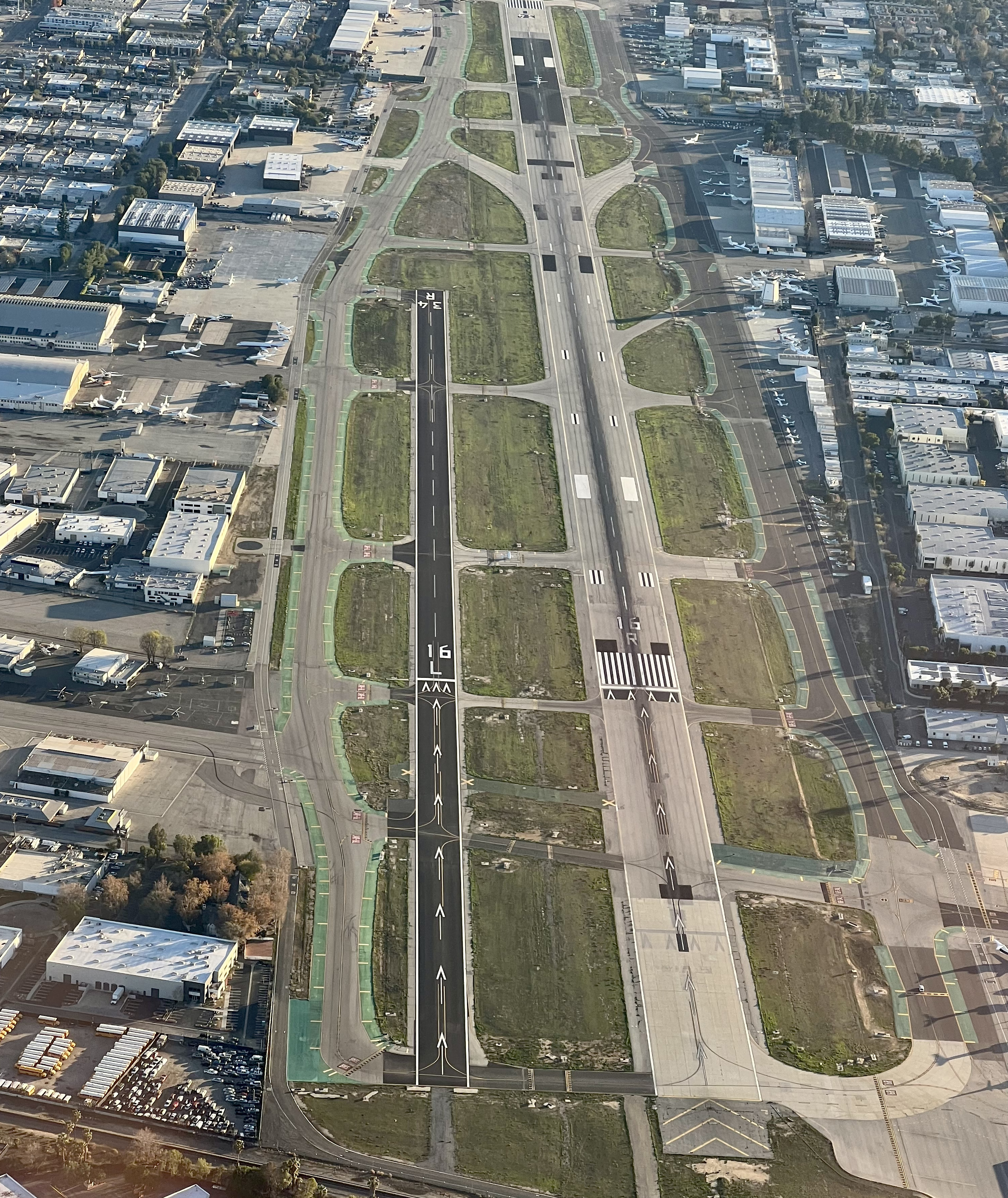
A 2022 aerial view of KVNY Runways (looking south)

- 16R/34L: 8,001 ft × 150 ft (2,439 m × 46 m), asphalt
- 16L/34R: 4,013 ft × 75 ft (1,223 m × 23 m), asphalt

== Airline and destinations ==
Airlines	Destinations
Aero	Charter: Aspen, Heber City, Las Vegas, Teterboro, Thermal, San José del Cabo, Sun Valley; Seasonal charter: Kahului, Napa

== Incidents ==
- In the mid 1950s, a single engine airplane that was trying to land at Van Nuys Airport crashed due to severe fog into the roof of a house located at 7807 (approximate address number) Louise Avenue in Northridge. The home was unoccupied at the time. The pilot died in the crash.
- On the night of March 26, 2000, a KTTV news helicopter, "Sky Fox 2", a secondary helicopter that was previously owned by KTLA, crashed at Van Nuys airport after experiencing problems while covering the Academy Awards.
- A Cessna 525 Citation CJ1 twin-engine jet departing for Long Beach Airport crashed 0.5 miles (1 km) north of the airport on January 12, 2007, killing two people on board. One was reported to be the owner of the company which operated the aircraft.
- On November 25, 2008, a Cessna 310 carrying two people experienced landing gear problems. After burning off fuel, it was able to land on the runway without incident, although its front gear collapsed upon landing.
- On January 9, 2015, a Lancair kit aircraft crashed after takeoff just south of the airport at the intersection of Vanowen Street and Hayvenhurst Avenue. The pilot, an experienced flight instructor and Jet Propulsion Laboratory robotics engineer, was killed.
- On September 11, 2020, a small plane crashed into a parking lot on Hayvenhurst Avenue after takeoff, killing both the pilot and passenger.

== Museums ==
- Condor Squadron, flying museum with a fleet of T-6 Texans for airshows and flyovers.

== Filming location ==
Van Nuys Airport has been the location of many film, television, and music video shoots.

=== Film ===
- Parts of the climactic scene of the film Casablanca (1942) were filmed at Van Nuys Airport, at the time known as Metropolitan Airport.
- The airport was used for landing the 747 in the film Executive Decision (1996), referred to as Frederick Field
- The dramatic ending of the film noir Armored Car Robbery (1950) takes place at what was then Los Angeles Metropolitan Airport. Antagonist William Talman and his burlesque queen girlfriend Adele Jergens are attempting to escape by chartered airplane. Cornered by Detective Charles McGraw, Talman runs and is killed on the runway by a landing airplane.
- In 2005, One Six Right (2005), a film documenting the history of Van Nuys Airport, was released. It was named after the most favored runway at the airport.
- A major part of the science fiction motion picture Silent Running (1972) was filmed at the Van Nuys Airport in March 1971. The Domes from the spacecraft that contained the last surviving forests were filmed there.

=== Television ===
- Many television shows have filmed episodes at the airport, including 24 (Season 5), Alias, JAG, T. J. Hooker, and Wonder Woman.
- The 1980s action-espionage series Airwolf used the Van Nuys Airport hangars regularly as the site of "Santini Air", the charter air service company owned and operated by Ernest Borgnine's character (Dominic Santini) in the series.
- In the last episode of Season 1 of the HBO series Entourage, the final scene takes place at Van Nuys Airport, where Vincent Chase and company take off for New York City. It was also used in the fourth season when Kanye West offers the group a plane ride on a Marquis Jet to Cannes. In Season 5 episode 7, Chase and Ari Gold run into each other in a hangar as each are about to depart on separate flights to Geneva, Switzerland and Hawaii, respectively. The last episode of season 6, episode 12, is used as a location where Chase and his crew run into Matt Damon on the way to Italy for a film shoot. In season 8 episode 8, Vince, Johnny and Turtle fly to Paris for Vince's wedding, while Eric and Sloan fly elsewhere and their planes take off at the same time for the finale to the show.

=== Music video ===
- Pat Benatar's music video for "Shadows of the Night," featuring the Condor Squadron's T-6 Texans
- Britney Spears's music video for "Stronger"
- Metallica's music video for "The Memory Remains"
- Blink-182's music video for "All The Small Things"
- Air Supply's first music video for "Making Love Out of Nothing At All"
- Kiss's music video for "God Gave Rock and Roll To You 2"
- Michael Jackson's music video for "Stranger In Moscow" (1996)
