= Execuflight Flight 1526 =

2015 aviation accident in Ohio

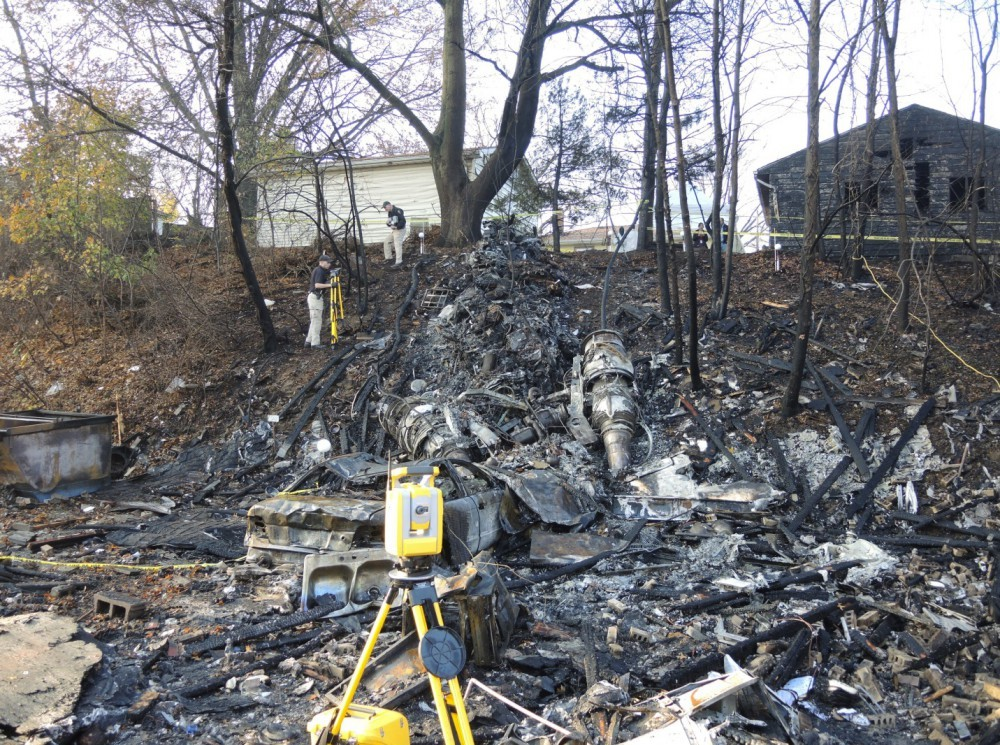
- Wreckage of the aircraft

Accident
- Date: November 10, 2015
- Summary: Stalled on approach due to pilot error
- Site: Akron, Ohio, United States; 41°03′17″N 81°25′24″W

Aircraft
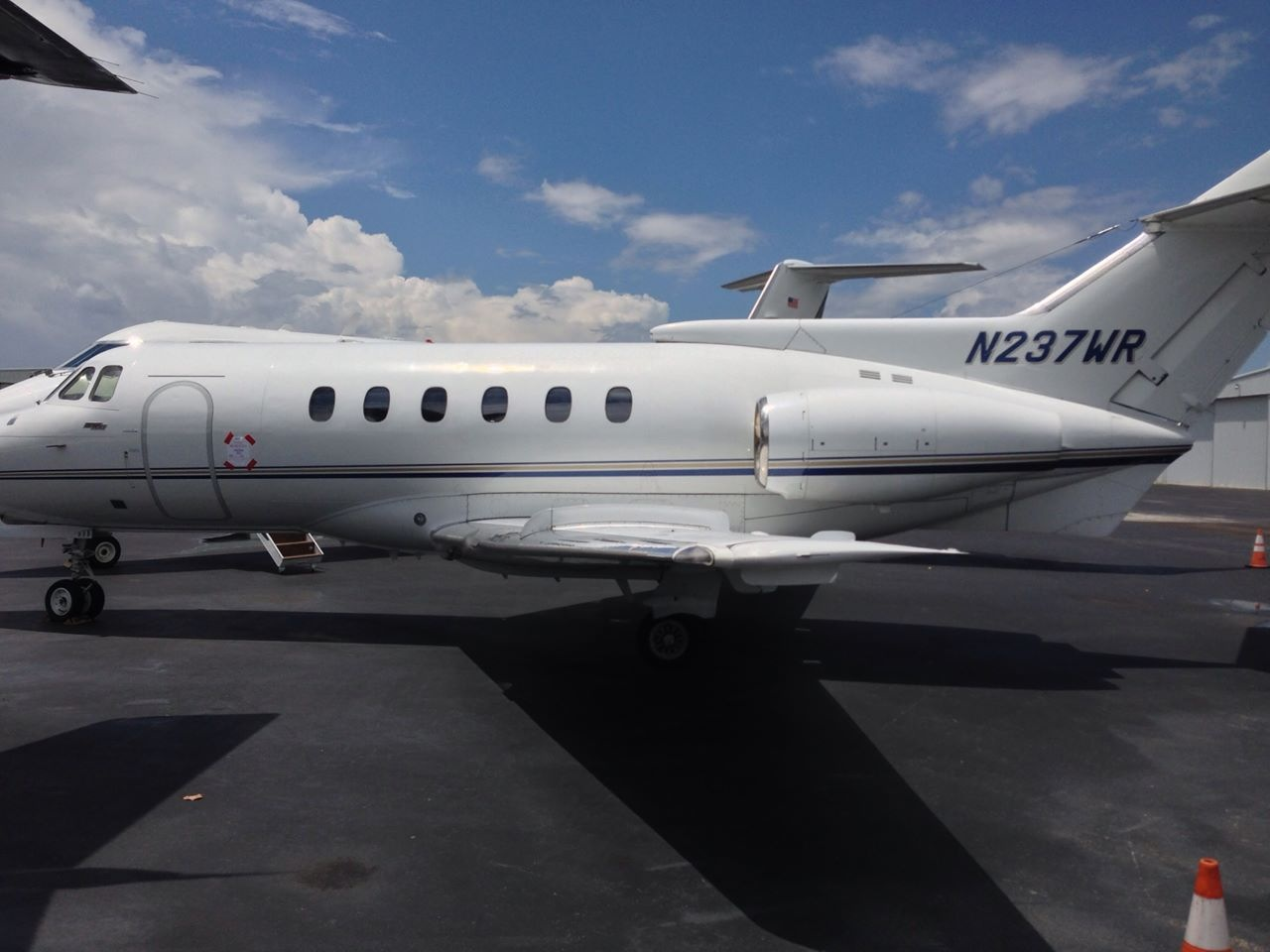
- N237WR, the aircraft involved in the accident, pictured in 2013
- Aircraft type: British Aerospace BAe-125-700A
- Operator: Execuflight
- Call sign: ZIPLINE 1526
- Registration: N237WR
- Flight origin: Dayton–Wright Brothers Airport, Dayton, Ohio, United States
- Destination: Akron Executive Airport, Akron, Ohio, United States
- Occupants: 9
- Passengers: 7
- Crew: 2
- Fatalities: 9
- Survivors: 0

Execuflight Flight 1526 was a regularly scheduled charter flight from Dayton–Wright Brothers Airport to Akron Executive Airport in Ohio. On November 10, 2015, the aircraft operating the flight crashed into an apartment building while on approach into Akron, killing all 9 occupants onboard. The investigation found that the crew performed an unstabilized approach, unknowingly letting the aircraft descend too fast and letting the airspeed gradually decrease until it entered a stall from which the crew did not recover.

== Background ==
=== Aircraft ===
The aircraft involved was a British Aerospace BAe-125-700A, registration N237WR (serial no. 257072), manufactured by British Aerospace in 1979. The aircraft was equipped with two Garrett TFE731-3-1H engines.

=== Crew ===
The crew consisted of Colombian captain Oscar Chávez (aged 40) and Italian first officer Renato Marchese (aged 50). There were no flight attendants on the flight but there were 7 business officials from a property management company in Florida. The captain was employed by Execuflight in 2015. His cumulative flight experience was 6,170 hours, of which he had flown 3,414 hours as pilot-in-command, including 1,020 on the British Aerospace BAe-125-700A, of those 670 were as pilot in command. The first officer was hired by Execuflight in 2015 as well. He had 4,382 hours of flying experience, 3,200 of which he had served as pilot-in-command, including 482 on the British Aerospace BAe-125-700A, of those 482 were as a first officer.

== Accident ==
During approach the pilots noticed that the weather conditions were much worse than anticipated. The first officer, whose job it should have been to conduct the approach briefing, asked the captain to do so. The pilots then discussed an approach to runway 25. Indianapolis Air Traffic Control instructed the aircraft to fly over the "HUUVR" crossing at an altitude of 9,000 feet (2,700 m) and contact air traffic control in Cleveland. The pilots then continued to discuss the approach to runway 25.

As the business jet approached Akron, its pilots were instructed to slow down the approach, as a small Piper PA-28-161 aircraft was supposed to land on the same runway. The crew of the BAe-125 was instructed to change course, slow down, and remain at an altitude of 3,000 feet (900 m). After landing, the Piper's crew reported that the cloud cover had broken in the conditions of minimal visibility. The crew was instructed to descend further by ATC, but failed to do so. Noticing that they had not descended, the first officer increased the descent rate (reaching up to 2,000 feet per minute which was twice the normal descent rate), and at the same time slowing the plane, almost 20 knots (23 mph; 37 km/h) below the normal airspeed. The captain voiced his concerns on these matters but did not take action.

About 14 seconds after the minimum altitude of 500 feet (150 m) was reached, the airspeed had already decayed to 98 knots (113 mph; 181 km/h). The aircraft entered a stall and banked sharply to the left before crashing into an apartment building 2 miles (3.2 km) from the runway threshold, exploding on impact and destroying the building. The crash was captured on video by a neighboring resident in an adjacent apartment and was also captured on CCTV cameras nearby. The aircraft was completely destroyed by the impact and fire. All seven passengers and two crew members died in the crash. No one on the ground was injured or killed.

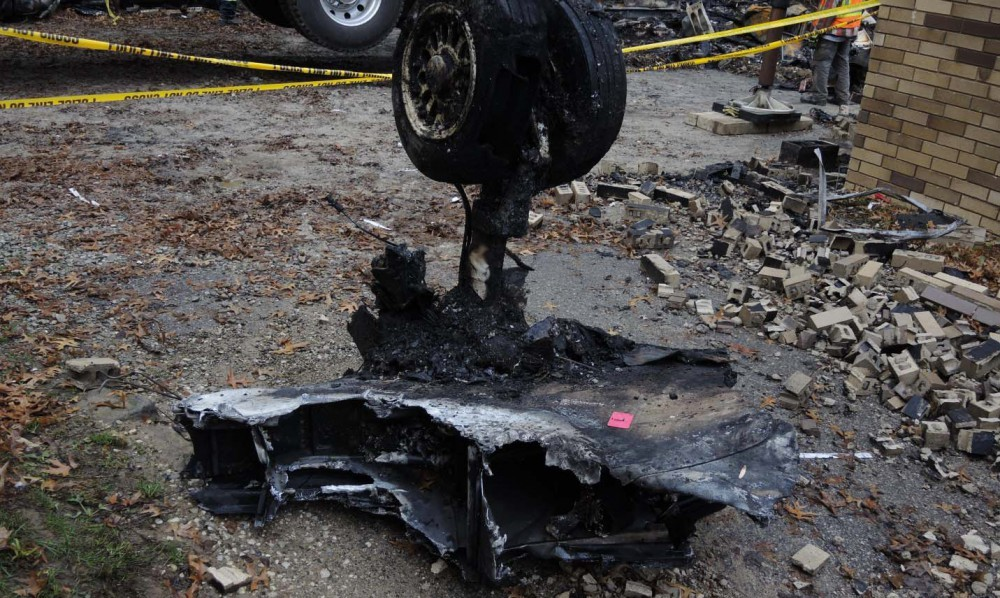
Undercarriage of the aircraft

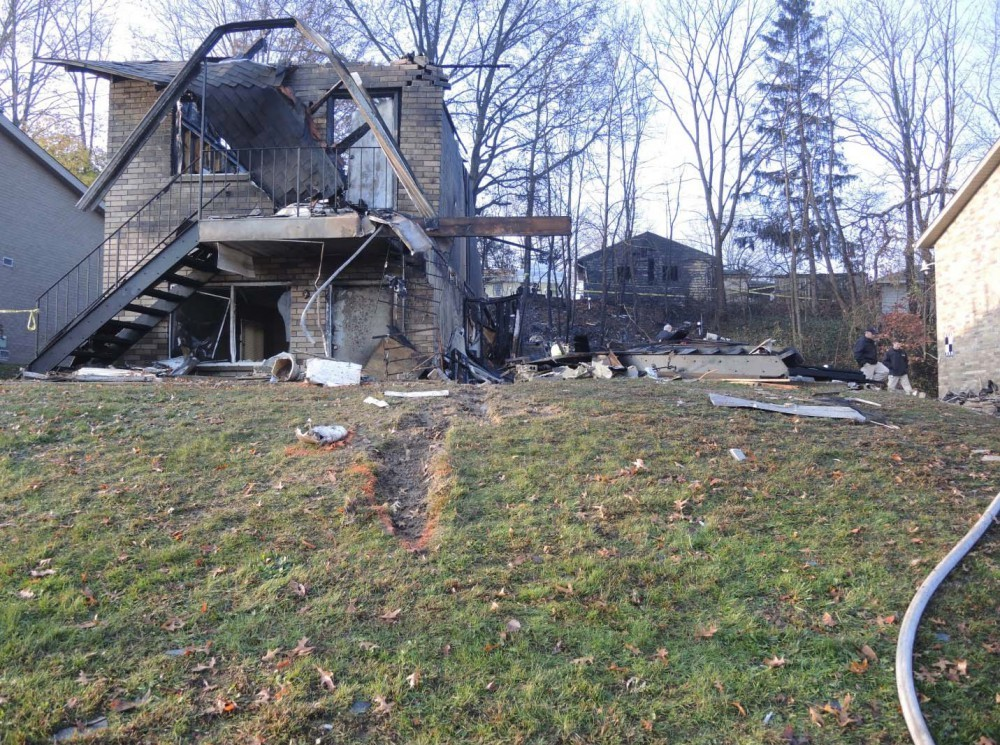
The building struck by the plane destroyed by fire

== Investigation ==
The National Transportation Safety Board (NTSB) was assigned to investigate the cause of the accident. A review of the two pilots' training records revealed that the captain had been fired by his previous employer after failing to show up for training. The first officer had also been fired by his last employer for poor performance in training. The president of Execuflight was aware of the shortcomings of the two pilots but had decided to hire them. The captain had been hired because of his extensive experience with the BAe-125 with the president of the airline company unaware of the captain's poor performance during flight training. The first officer was hired on the basis of a recommendation from an airline pilot and also flew a test flight to assess his flight performance. No effort was made to contact the pilots' previous employers and inquire about their specific deficits, leading to both being hired by Execuflight soon after.

The NTSB determined that the probable cause of the accident was:

The flight crew's mismanagement of the approach and multiple deviations from company SOPs, which placed the airplane in an unsafe situation and led to an unstabilized approach, a descent below MDA without visual contact with the runway environment, and an aerodynamic stall. Contributing to the accident were Execuflight's casual attitude toward compliance with standards; its inadequate hiring, training, and operational oversight of the flight crew; the company's lack of a formal safety program; and the FAA's insufficient oversight of the company's training program and flight operations.

== In popular culture ==
The accident was featured in season 21 of the Canadian television series, Mayday (known as Air Crash Investigation in the UK) titled "Playing Catch Up".

== See also ==
- 2017 Teterboro Learjet 35 crash – Also stalled and crashed on approach with violations of standard operating procedures
