= Napa County Airport =

Napa County Airport Napa Army Airfield
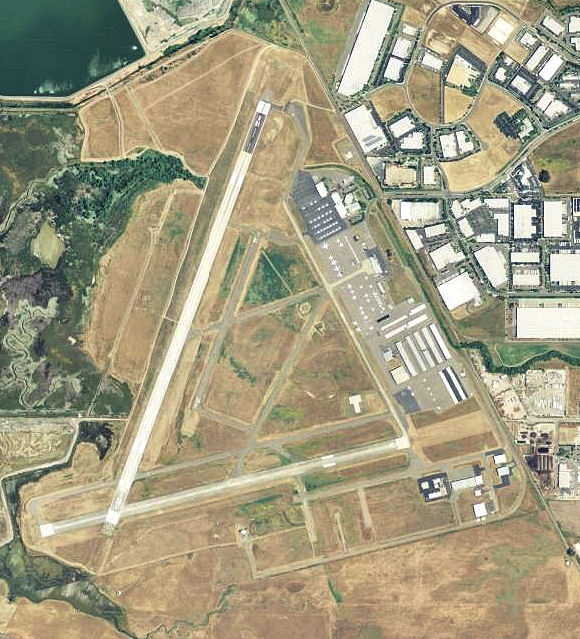
- 2006 USGS photo
- IATA: APC; ICAO: KAPC; FAA LID: APC

Summary
- Airport type: General Aviation (Public)
- Operator: Napa County
- Location: Napa County, near Napa, California
- Elevation AMSL: 35 ft (11 m)
- Coordinates: 38°12′47.50″N 122°16′50.50″W

Map
- Location of airport in California / United States APC (the United States)

Runways
Direction	Length		Surface
Direction	ft	m	Surface
6/24	5,007	1,526	Concrete
19R/1L	5,930	1,807	Asphalt
19L/1R	2,510	765	Asphalt

Napa County Airport (IATA: APC, ICAO: KAPC, FAA LID: APC) (Napa Valley Airport) is a public airport five miles (8 km) south of Napa, in Napa County, California, United States. It has three runways.

During 2008 the airport's 1960-era control tower received extensive radio, plumbing and electrical upgrades and renovations funded by the federal government.

Airport officials said the airport had about 122,000 flights take off or land at the facility annually in 2008.

== History ==
The airport was built by the United States Army Air Forces in the early 1940s, and was known as Napa Flight Strip. It was an emergency landing airfield for military aircraft on training flights. It was expanded later in the war and renamed Napa Army Airfield, becoming an auxiliary airfield of the Fourth Air Force Hamilton Army Airfield. 4th Air Force used the base to train replacement fighter pilots, primarily flying P-38 Lightnings before being deployed overseas.

After World War II the property was deeded to Napa County by the War Assets Administration for civil use. The airport soon became a business hub for what was once a rural, sparsely populated area in the south end of the county.

Jonesy's Restaurant opened for business in 1946 at the airport and was a longtime favorite. The restaurant remained in business for 63 years before closing in 2010.

By 1947 half a dozen small businesses had opened at the facility, but only Bridgeford Flying Service remained open past the first year and remains in business today. In 2012 the name was changed from Bridgeford Flying Service to Napa Jet Center. In 1971 International Air Service Company (IASCO) and Japan Airlines (JAL) opened a flight training school at the airport.

In June 2010 Japan Airlines announced that it would be closing its training facility as part of a bankruptcy reorganization plan. In February 2012 IASCO announced that it would be moving its training facility to Redding, California in early March.

In June 2014, International Airline Training Academy signed an agreement to lease space at the airport to train pilots for a five-year period. IATA no longer operates from the Napa County Airport as of 2017.

The control tower sustained minor damage in the 2014 South Napa earthquake.

On May 22, 2015, Surf Air started flying regular service to the airport.

The parallel runways 18R/L and 36R/L have been repaved and renumbered 19R/L and 1R/L as of October, 2019.

Photos taken at the Napa County Airport indicate that a wide variety of business aircraft have used the airfield over the years including privately operated jets as large as the Boeing Business Jet (BBJ) version of the Boeing 737-700 as well as the McDonnell Douglas MD-87 jetliner.

=== Historical airline service ===
By the spring of 1947, Southwest Airways (which in 1958 subsequently changed its name to Pacific Air Lines, the predecessor of Air West and Hughes Airwest) was serving the Napa County Airport with six daily flights operated with Douglas DC-3 aircraft with three round trip services flying San Francisco - Oakland - Napa - Sacramento - Marysville/Yuba City - Chico - Red Bluff - Redding with two of these flights continuing northbound serving Yreka and Medford. The April 27, 1947 Southwest Airways timetable listed its service into the airport as Vallejo-Napa noting that Napa County Airport was the airfield it used to serve both cities. Southwest Airways had ceased serving the airport by the fall of 1953. Several small commuter airlines also served the airport with scheduled passenger flights in the past. In 1969, Golden Pacific Airlines (1969-1973) was operating five flights every weekday from San Francisco International Airport (SFO) with Beechcraft 99 commuter turboprop aircraft. By 1978, Stol Air Commuter was operating six flights every weekday from San Francisco International with Britten-Norman BN-2 Islander and Britten-Norman BN-2A Trislander prop aircraft.

The airport currently has scheduled passenger flights, with airline service provided by Aero offering a "scheduled charter" service with Embraer ERJ-135 regional jets. JSX (airline) serves Napa seasonally with nonstop flights to southern California via both the Hollywood Burbank Airport (BUR) and John Wayne Airport (SNA) in Orange County operated with Embraer regional jets. Other scheduled passenger airline services are available at Sonoma County Airport (STS) in Santa Rosa as well as Oakland San Francisco Bay Airport (OAK) and San Francisco International Airport (SFO).

== Airlines and destinations ==
Airlines	Destinations
Aero	Seasonal charter: Los Angeles–Van Nuys
JSX	Seasonal: Burbank, Orange County, Santa Monica

== See also ==
- List of airports in the San Francisco Bay Area
- California World War II Army Airfields
