= Wood-Ridge station =

NJ Transit rail station

Wood-Ridge
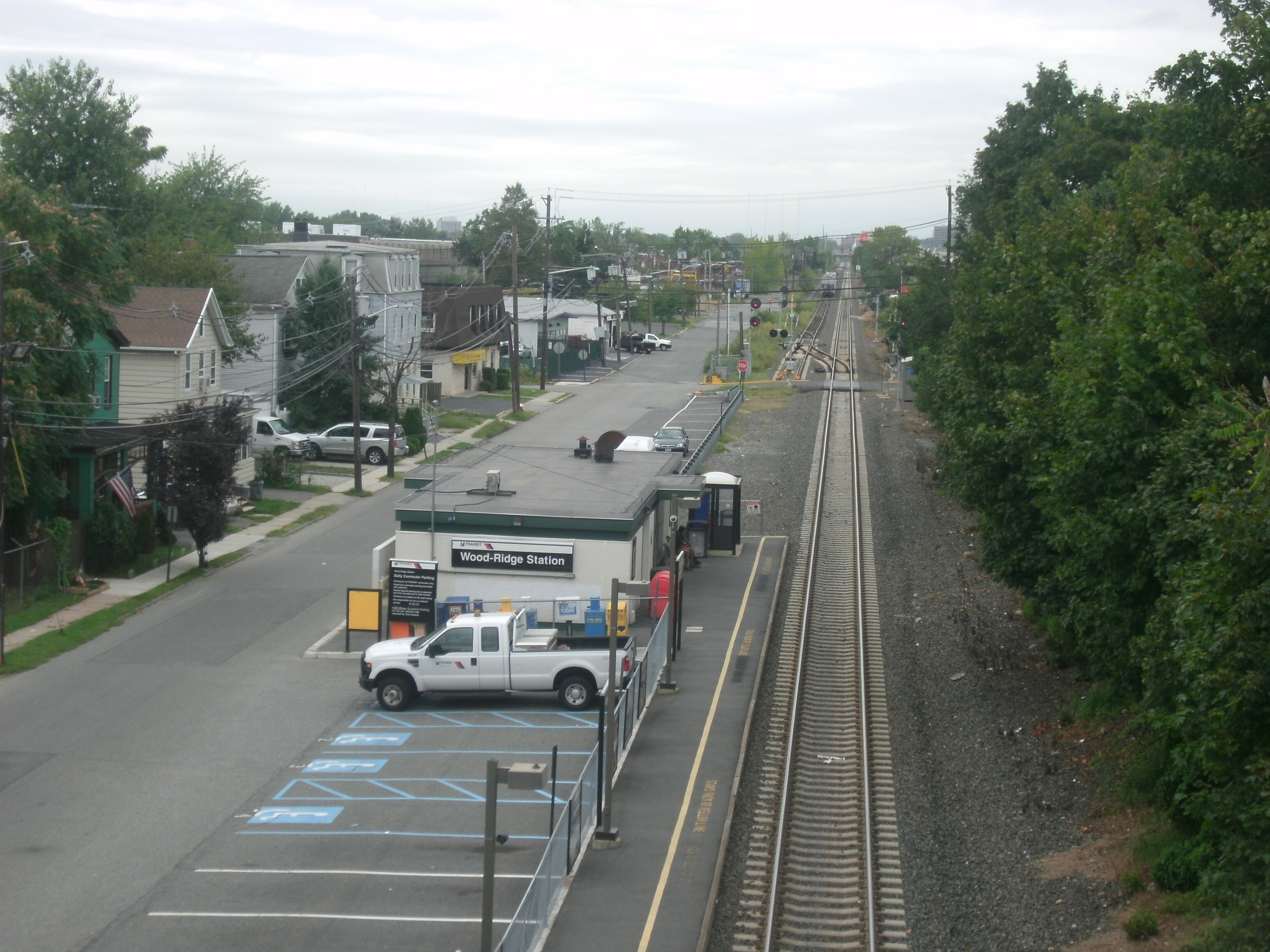
- The Wood-Ridge station in September 2011, from the bridge above the station.

General information
- Location: Park Place East at Route 17 / Moonachie Avenue interchange, Wood-Ridge, New Jersey
- Coordinates: 40.8437°N 74.0789°W
- Owner: New Jersey Transit
- Platforms: 1 side platform
- Tracks: 1

Construction
- Parking: 20
- Accessible: No

Other information
- Station code: 763 (Erie Railroad)
- Fare zone: 3

History
- Opened: January 21, 1861
- Rebuilt: 1967
- Former names: Woodridge–Moonachie

Key dates
- July 1, 1981: Station agent eliminated

Passengers
- 2025: 141 (average weekday)
- Rank: 108 of 153

Services
Preceding station	NJ Transit	Following station
Teterboro toward Spring Valley	Pascack Valley Line	Secaucus Junction toward Hoboken
Former services
Preceding station	Erie Railroad	Following station
Hasbrouck Heights toward Haverstraw	New Jersey and New York Railroad	Carlstadt toward Jersey City
Location

Wood-Ridge is an active commuter railroad train station in the borough of Wood-Ridge, Bergen County, New Jersey. Located next to the interchange of Route 17 and Moonachie (County Route 36), the single low-level side platform station services trains of New Jersey Transit's Pascack Valley Line between Hoboken Terminal and Spring Valley. The next station to the north is Teterboro and to the south is Secaucus Junction. Wood-Ridge station is not accessible to handicapped persons and contains parking along Park Place East.

Service through the Wood-Ridge section of Bergen Township began with the opening of the Hackensack and New York Railroad on January 21, 1861 as Woodridge–Moonachie. The station contained a two-story wooden passenger station with dimensions of 39 by 18 feet (11.9 m × 5.5 m) with two freight houses, a 13 by 13 feet (4.0 m × 4.0 m) wooden structure and an old railroad car body serving as a secondary facility. With the reconstruction of Route 17 in 1967, the railroad received approval to demolish the depot at Woodridge–Moonachie, which would be used by new right-of-way. As a result, a new 1,200-square-foot (110 m^{2}) concrete block depot would replace the wooden structure. This would also result in the elimination of stations at Hasbrouck Heights and Carlstadt.

New Jersey Transit eliminated the station agent on July 1, 1981, closing the station depot in 1987 due to vandalism. They reversed the decision in September 1997.

== History ==
On March 20, 1967, the Erie Lackawanna Railroad and the Bergen County Board of Freeholders attended a meeting of the Board of Public Utility Commissioners. Due to upcoming roadwork in the area, the railroad wanted to abandon the two stations at Hasbrouck Heights and one at Carlstadt. A fourth station, the Woodridge–Moonachie stop would be moved to the south. The upcoming roadwork involved the widening of Route 17, which results in the construction of multiple overpasses in the stretch: Paterson Plank Road, Moonachie Avenue (County Route 36), along with Williams Avenue and Franklin Avenues in Hasbrouck Heights.

The Public Utility Commissioners approved the decision to demolish the depots. As part of the station consolidation, Hasbrouck Heights and Carlstadt stops would be abandoned. Woodridge–Moonachie would be moved 0.5 miles (0.80 km) south and a new station depot would be built. Williams Avenue station in Hasbrouck Heights would be rebuilt with a new shelter and bus stop.

In June 1967, the New Jersey Department of Transportation announced they would open bids on reconstruction of Route 17, including the construction of the Moonachie Avenue overpass to help eliminate the high accident rate at the Route 17/Moonachie Avenue intersection. As part of the construction, Route 17 would be a highway of six 12-foot (3.7 m) wide lanes and 12-foot (3.7 m) shoulders from the original pair of 10-foot (3.0 m) lanes with 5-foot (1.5 m) shoulders. The six lanes would be separated by a 32-inch (81 cm) concrete Jersey barrier. Moonachie Avenue would be moved northward from its location to accommodate a new interchange. Anderson Avenue would go from a through street to a dead end and Bergen Street would be re-aligned to meet with the new Moonachie Avenue. Demolition of the Woodridge–Moonachie station and construction of its replacement. The Department of Transportation budgeted $7.25 million for the 3.8-mile (6.1 km) project.

In early July 1967, the Department of Transportation announced they would begin accepting construction bids on the project on July 27. They also announced that the reconstruction of the Woodridge–Moonachie station depot would be done entirely on state funding. The low-bid came in from George Brewster Construction and Equipment Company of Bogota at $2.5 million for the first stage of construction. The new station depot would be a 1,200-square-foot (110 m^{2}) concrete block depot with ticket and freight offices, storage, waiting and boiler rooms, along with toilet facilities. The removal of the Woodridge–Moonachie, Carlstadt and Hasbrouck Heights stations would be under other contracts. Four other bids were received, ranging between $2,726,748.57 and $3,203,980.95.

On September 6, 1967, construction of the Route 17 widening began. Demolition of buildings in the right-of-way began as well in September. A woodcraft building formerly known as Adelung's Hotel, near the station depot, would be a victim of the widening as well, much to the dismany of local residents. Demolition was underway by September 25.

On April 20, 1981, the borough of Wood-Ridge announced that the station agent at Wood-Ridge would be eliminated on July 1. New Jersey Transit told the municipality that the decision was made to help the agency reduce an $80 million deficit they were facing. The elimination would be tied with a 50 percent raise in railroad and bus fares.

In September 1997, New Jersey Transit received $185,000 to upgrade and rehabilitate the station depot at Wood-Ridge. As part of the funding, the station would get a newly-heated waiting room with fresh benches and restrooms. The single side platform would be repaved entirely and the parking lot would receive new lighting. NJ Transit noted that the station depot had fallen into massive disrepair for the ten years it had sat unused. The roof was leaking for at least several years, the tiles were grimed over and a graffiti artist had made themselves present. A lot of stenches from water and broken toilets were present in the building. New Jersey Transit noted that Wood-Ridge station saw a drop in ridership, believed to be partly due to the closed station building. The rehabilitated station depot opened to commuters on November 14, 1997, with local politicians on site to greet commuters.

Until 2016, the Wood-Ridge station was the only one to serve the borough. This changed when the Wesmont station serving the Bergen County Line opened near Wood-Ridge's border with Wallington.

== Station layout ==
The station has one track and one low-level side platform.

== Bibliography ==
- Jones, Wilson E. (1996). The Pascack Valley Line - A History of the New Jersey and New York Railroad. East Hanover, New Jersey: Railroadians of America. ISBN 0-941652-14-9.
- New Jersey State Board of Taxes and Assessment (1924). Eighth Annual Report of the New Jersey State Board of Taxes and Assessment for the Year Ending June 30, 1923. Trenton, New Jersey: MacCrellish & Quigley.
- Yanosey, Robert J. (2006). Erie Railroad Facilities (In Color). Vol. 1. Scotch Plains, New Jersey: Morning Sun Books Inc. pp. 100–101. ISBN 1-58248-183-0.
