= Screening Partnership Program =

Program for private screening in U.S. airports

The Screening Partnership Program (SPP), instituted in 2004 by the Transportation Security Administration (TSA) in the United States, is a program that allows airports to employ private security agencies to conduct screening, instead of having the TSA conduct said screenings. Airports and security agencies must complete applications in order to be eligible to participate in this program. All private security agencies must follow all TSA screening policies and procedures, and use TSA-approved equipment.

== Participating airports ==
As of 2016, 23 airports have participated in the SPP. Below is a list of participating airports:

| Airport name | Location | Year of approval | Year of withdrawal |
|---|---|---|---|
| Bert Mooney Airport | Near Butte, Montana | 2014 | 2015 |
| Bozeman Yellowstone International Airport | Near Bozeman, Montana | 2014 | 2015 |
| Charles M. Schulz–Sonoma County Airport | Near Santa Rosa, California | 2007 | |
| Dawson Community Airport | Glendive, Montana | 2009 | |
| Glacier Park International Airport | Near Kalispell, Montana | 2014 | 2015 |
| Greater Rochester International Airport | Near Rochester, New York | 2005 | |
| Havre City-County Airport | Havre, Montana | 2009 | |
| Jackson Hole Airport | Near Jackson, Wyoming | 2005 | 2023 |
| Kansas City International Airport | Near Kansas City, Missouri | 2005 | |
| Key West International Airport | Near Key West, Florida | 2007 | 2022 |
| L. M. Clayton Airport | Near Wolf Point, Montana | 2009 | |
| Orlando Sanford International Airport | Sanford, Florida | 2014 | |
| Portsmouth International Airport | Portsmouth, New Hampshire | 2014 | |
| Punta Gorda Airport | Near Punta Gorda, Florida | 2016 | |
| Roswell International Air Center | Near Roswell, New Mexico | 2016 | |
| San Francisco International Airport | Near San Francisco, California | 2005 | |
| Sarasota–Bradenton International Airport | Near Sarasota and Bradenton, Florida | 2014 | |
| Sidney–Richland Municipal Airport | Sidney, Montana | 2009 | |
| Sioux Falls Regional Airport | Sioux Falls, South Dakota | 2005 | |
| Tupelo Regional Airport | Tupelo, Mississippi | 2005 | |
| Glasgow Valley County Airport | Glasgow, Montana | 2009 | |
| Yellowstone Airport | West Yellowstone, Montana | 2014 | 2015 |

== Qualified private agencies ==
Below is a list of qualified private agencies that are TSA-approved:

- Akal Security
- AM-Guard, Inc.
- Asset Protection & Security Services, LP
- AT Systems Security, Inc.
- BOS Security, Inc.
- Inter-Con Security
- Chenega Corporation
- Covenant Aviation Security
- Executive Security
- FirstLine Transportation Security, Inc.
- Heritage Security Services
- Inter-Con Security Systems
- ISS Action
- Lockheed Martin Information Technology
- Northrop Grumman Technical Services
- Omniplex World Services Corp.
- Securiguard, Inc.
- Spartan Security Services
- Systems Training and Resource Technology, Inc.
- Transcontinental Enterprise, Inc.
- Trinity Technology Group
- Universal Service Protection
- VMD Corp
- Walden Security

== Application process ==
=== Airports ===
1. Airports that are interested in participating in the SPP first need to present an application to their local federal security director.
2. Afterwards, it may then take up to 120 days to receive a status on the application. If the airport is approved, issuing of the contract may take up to 12 months.
3. If the contract is indeed issued, transition into the program may take from four to six months.

=== Private screening agencies ===
To apply to the program as a private screening agency, the agency must first make sure there are available opportunities detailed on the Federal Business Opportunities website. Afterwards, the agency can proceed to apply.

If contracted, these agencies will work for the TSA rather than the airport authority.

== Reception and concerns ==
=== Benefits of the SPP ===
Frequent flyers, airport executives, and lawmakers have argued that it will improve quality of service and make the screening process more efficient. Airport executives and lawmakers also say that private agencies can do some things that the TSA doesn't do (such being able to report an issue, get a response within minutes, and have it be remedied fast), making private agencies more desirable. There are no financial or procedural differences. Additionally, many high ranking aviation-security-affiliated individuals (such as T. J. Orr, aviation director for Charlotte Douglas International Airport and Mark VanLoh, director of the aviation department for Kansas City) believe that moving towards a private security/screening force is essential, and that they would prefer to be in charge of the security in their airports, to ensure accountability and constant quality of service.

Lawmakers also say that they can't understand the TSA's resistance to the program, considering that it creates jobs.

=== Supposed issues with the TSA ===
Several airports, such as Midway International Airport and O'Hare International Airport, have occasionally notified flyers that they should arrive around 3 hours before their flight, in case delays are to occur due to the supposed inefficiency of the TSA. Periodically, flyers have even missed their flights as a result of long lines for screening and other general delays, which has influenced people to want to switch to private screening agencies.

Additionally, in 2015, the United States Department of Homeland Security (DHS) inspector general, John Roth, expressed concern with how "challenges [are] in almost every area of TSA’s operations ... failures in passenger and baggage screening operations, [were] discovered in part through our covert testing program".

=== Issues with private screening agencies ===
An instance of cheating on screening tests occurred in 2006, where DHS officials found TSA agents cooperating with workers of Covenant Aviation Security in the San Francisco International Airport, in which the TSA gave the private security firm an early notice of upcoming inspections. Covenant Aviation Security went on to set off the screeners to make it seem as though they were properly inspecting luggage. All TSA officials, as well the security personnel from Covenant Aviation Security were disciplined, but none ended up losing their jobs.

=== Issues with privatization ===
Much of the negative response to airport security privatization comes from within the TSA. Officials of the TSA have expressed the concern that airports simply want to rid themselves of the influence of the Federal Government. According to Representative John Mica, the TSA should act less like government personnel, and more like security personnel.

Since the TSA has already laid out all the policies for how airport security in the United States should work, hired private agencies are required to follow these policies. This in turn narrows down the debate to quality and efficiency of customer service, rather than matters of security (as those are already addressed).

== Motivation and history ==
Below is a list of years during which airports were approved to participate in the SPP, as well as years of key congressional hearings associated with the SPP:

=== 2004 ===
The creation of the SPP was inspired and greatly motivated by Republican lawmakers (such as Rep. Richard Hudson and Rep. John L. Mica) to make the screening process more efficient, as well as the voices of frequent flyers and analysts. Since its creation in 2004, the TSA has had at least 32 airports apply for the SPP.

=== 2005 ===
Some of the first airports to apply and be approved in 2005 were the following:

- San Francisco International Airport
- Kansas City International Airport
- Greater Rochester International Airport
- Jackson Hole Airport
- Tupelo Regional Airport
- Sioux Falls Airport

=== 2007 ===
Key West International Airport and Sonoma County Airport were approved for participating in the SPP in 2007.

=== 2009 ===
In 2009, the following airports were approved to participate in the SPP:

- Dawson Community Airport
- Glasgow International Airport
- Havre City-County Airport
- L. M. Clayton International Airport
- Sidney–Richland Municipal Airport

As of 2009, there were 13 airports participating in the SPP.

=== 2012 ===
In 2012, a congressional hearing entitled "Why is a job-creating, public-private partnership meeting resistance at the TSA?" was held to examine the causes of the TSA's resistance to the SPP.

According to the opening statement of Representative Mike Rogers (a supporter of the SPP), the TSA should work to "strengthen and improve the private screening program and make it more cost-efficient so that U.S. businesses can take on a more meaningful role".

John S. Pistole, then the Administrator of the TSA, responded by saying that in 2010 (or 2011?) he "directed a full review of TSA policies", that the SPP was only one of the programs that was reviewed, that he "did not see any clear and substantial advantage to expanding the program", and that he is "open to approving new applications where a clear and substantial benefit could be realized". He also noted that a Federal workforce allows for more "flexibility".

=== 2014 ===
In 2014, the following airports were approved to participate in the SPP:

- Bozeman Yellowstone International Airport
- Bert Mooney Airport
- Glacier Park International Airport
- Yellowstone Airport
- Orlando Sanford International Airport
- Sarasota-Brandenton International Airport
- Portsmouth International Airport

As of 2014, there were 21 airports participating in the SPP.

There was a congressional hearing on July 29, 2014, which was focused on the topic of "Examing TSA's management of the Screening Partnership Program".

According to the opening statement of Representative Richard Hudson, lawmakers and stakeholders believe that "the private sector is highly capable of providing efficient and effective screening services. Unfortunately, TSA’s actions over the last few years seem to demonstrate that it does not share this goal".

=== 2015 ===
In 2015, there was a congressional hearing on November 17, 2015, which was focused on the topic of how "Improved cost estimates can enhance program decision making".

According to a testimony from Congressman John Katko, the TSA's "cost estimating practices and methodology developed in 2013 compared against best practices, TSA’s cost estimates have some strengths, but also have limitations in four general characteristics that best practices call for in a high-quality and reliable cost estimate" and that these "limitations in each of the four characteristics of a high quality cost estimate prevent TSA’s estimates from being reliable".

=== 2016 ===
In 2016, the following airport(s) were approved to participate in the SPP.

- Roswell International Air Center
- Punta Gorda Airport

As of 2016, there are 20 airports participating in the SPP.

There have not yet been any key congressional hearings associated with the SPP.

== See also ==
- Transportation Security Administration
- U.S. Department of Homeland Security
- Traveler Redress Inquiry Program
