= South Dakota Air National Guard =

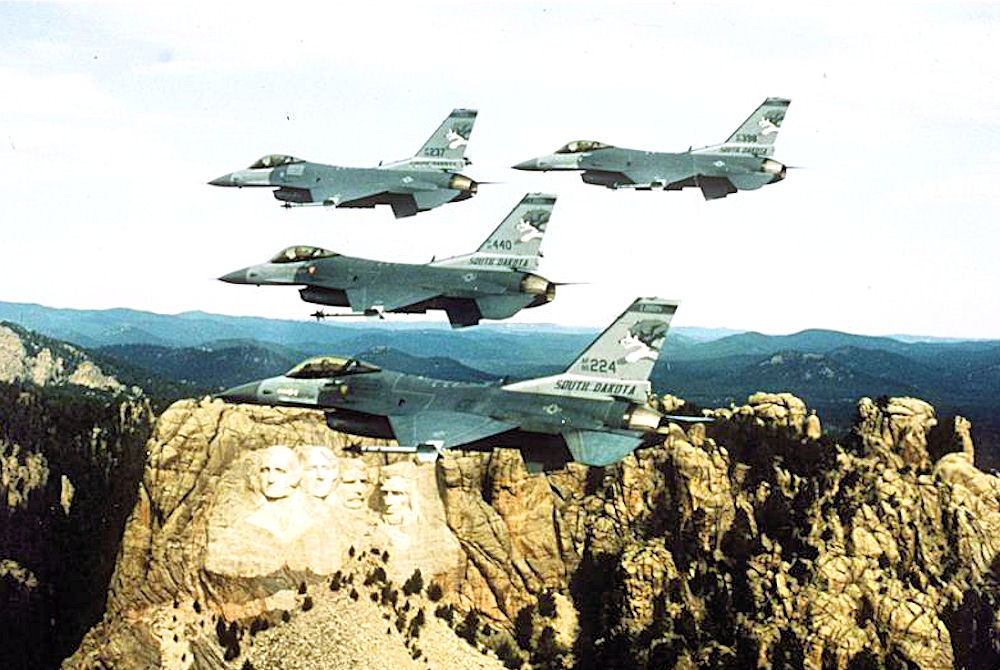
- Four-ship F-16 formation of the 175th Fighter Squadron "Lobos" from Sioux Falls AGB over Mount Rushmore. The 175th is the oldest unit in the South Dakota Air National Guard, having over 60 years of service to the state and nation.
- Active: 20 September 1946 – Present
- Country: United States
- Allegiance: South Dakota
- Branch: Air National Guard
- Type: State militia, military reserve force
- Role: "To meet state and federal mission responsibilities."
- Part of: South Dakota Department of the Military; United States National Guard Bureau
- Garrison/HQ: South Dakota Air National Guard, 1201 West Algonquin Street, Sioux Falls, South Dakota, 57104

Commanders
- Civilian leadership: President Donald Trump (Commander-in-Chief); Gary A. Ashworth (Secretary of the Air Force); Governor Larry Rhoden (Governor of the State of South Dakota)
- State military leadership: Major General Mark Morrell

Insignia
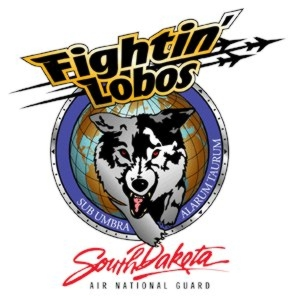
- Emblem of the South Dakota Air National Guard

Aircraft flown
- Fighter: F-16 Fighting Falcon

The South Dakota Air National Guard (SD ANG) is the aerial militia of the State of South Dakota, United States of America. It is a reserve of the United States Air Force and along with the South Dakota Army National Guard an element of the South Dakota National Guard of the larger United States National Guard Bureau.

As state militia units, the units in the South Dakota Air National Guard are not in the normal United States Air Force chain of command. They are under the jurisdiction of the governor of South Dakota through the office of the South Dakota Adjutant General unless they are federalized by order of the president of the United States. The South Dakota Air National Guard is headquartered in Sioux Falls, and its commander is Major General Mark Morrell as of 2026.

== Overview ==
Under the "Total Force" concept, South Dakota Air National Guard units are considered to be Air Reserve Components (ARC) of the United States Air Force (USAF). South Dakota ANG units are trained and equipped by the Air Force and are operationally gained by a major command of the USAF if federalized. In addition, the South Dakota Air National Guard forces are assigned to Air Expeditionary Forces and are subject to deployment tasking orders along with their active duty and Air Force Reserve counterparts in their assigned cycle deployment window.

Along with their federal reserve obligations, as state militia units the elements of the South Dakota ANG are subject to being activated by order of the governor to provide protection of life and property, and preserve peace, order and public safety. State missions include disaster relief in times of earthquakes, hurricanes, floods and forest fires, search and rescue, protection of vital public services, and support to civil defense.

== Components ==
The South Dakota Air National Guard consists of the following major unit:

- 114th Fighter Wing

Established 20 September 1946 (as: 175th Fighter Squadron); operates: F-16 Fighting Falcon
Stationed at: Joe Foss Field Air National Guard Station, Sioux Falls
Gained by: Air Combat Command
The 114th Fighter Wing deploys worldwide and executes directed tactical fighter sorties to destroy enemy forces, supplies, equipment, communications systems and installations with conventional munitions.

== History ==
On 24 May 1946, the United States Army Air Forces, in response to dramatic postwar military budget cuts imposed by President Harry S. Truman, allocated inactive unit designations to the National Guard Bureau for the formation of an Air Force National Guard. These unit designations were allotted and transferred to various State National Guard bureaus to provide them unit designations to re-establish them as Air National Guard units.

The War Department authorized the establishment of Air National Guard Squadrons, Groups and Wings in 48 States. The formation of a South Dakota - Iowa Air National Guard and assignment of Col. Frederick Gray Jr., who was a veteran fighter pilot having served with the 8th Air Force and The RAF, as group instructor for both units, was announced by Brigadier General Charles H. Grahl, Iowa Adjutant General, at Des Moines, Iowa on 26 June 1946. Squadrons of the Air Force, each with 34 planes of various types, were located in Sioux Falls, at Sioux City and Des Moines, Iowa. Air Guardsmen under Col. Gray were trained to throw 102 planes into battle within 12 days. Lt. Col. Ted Arndt assistant to the Adjutant General surveyed local air field facilities, making note of buildings and installations to be needed by the new Air Force. The South Dakota Air National Guard 175th Fighter Squadron, with Thirteen officers, was approved by Col. E.A. Beckwith, Adjutant General, Rapid City, South Dakota on 20 September 1946. The 175th Fighter Squadron was assigned to the 132d Fighter Wing, Des Moines, Iowa. The unit was equipped with the F-51D Mustang, and several types of support aircraft. 18 September 1947, however, is considered the South Dakota Air National Guard's official birth concurrent with the establishment of the United States Air Force as a separate branch of the United States military under the National Security Act.

=== Cold War ===
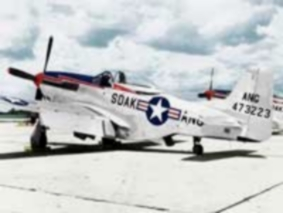
A North American F-51D Mustang of the 175th Fighter Squadron

The 175th was reassigned to the 133rd Fighter Interceptor Wing along with units from Fargo, Duluth and Minneapolis in November 1950. The unit was called to active duty during the Korean War on 1 March 1951 and moved to Ellsworth Air Force Base, Rapid City, South Dakota, to provide support for the Convair B-36 bombers of the 28th Bombardment Wing stationed there. The unit was returned to state control and reorganized on 1 December 1952.

Two Lockheed T-33 Shooting Star trainers were assigned to the unit in July 1954 to start the transition of the pilots into jet aircraft. The first jet assigned was the F-94A/B Starfire. On 16 April 1956, the 175th Fighter Interceptor Squadron became part of the newly constituted 114th Fighter Interceptor Group, headquartered at Sioux Falls.

In May 1956, the first F-94C Starfire was received and in 1958, the F-94s were retired for the more powerful and longer range Northrop F-89 Scorpion. After two years this plane was already replaced by the Convair F-102 Delta Dagger.

In 1960, the unit received the F-102As and was placed under the direct supervision of the Aerospace Defense Command. The 114th FIG was assigned to the 132d Fighter Wing. As part of taking over a more active role in the defense of the continental United States, aircrews were placed on five-minute alert, and four aircraft were armed and ready to intercept and destroy enemy targets.

A significant change was encountered in May 1970 when the 114th Fighter Group, Aerospace Defense Command, was redesignated to the 114th Tactical Fighter Group, Tactical Air Command. The F-102s were replaced with the F-100D Super Sabre. The mission became that of controlling the combat skies from enemy use and to reinforce the combat forces on the ground. The South Dakota ANG deployed with their F-100s to Italy and Norway. In March 1976, news was received that the unit's F-100D aircraft would be replaced by the A-7D Corsair II. The last Super Sabres left Joe Foss Field in June 1977.

In 1979, the unit began a 12-year era of participation in Operation Coronet Cove at Howard Air Force Base, Panama Canal Zone, providing for defense of the Panama Canal. Both aircrew and support personnel were extended there in the summer of 1979 during the Nicaraguan Revolution. The unit was awarded the Armed Forces Expeditionary Streamer for combat duty as a part of Operation Just Cause during 1989–1990. Overseas deployments with the A-7 included Portugal, the United Kingdom and Belgium.

The 114 TFG received the first F-16C/D fighters in August 1991 with the official conversion from the A-7 to the F-16 occurring on 1 January 1992. The unit was redesignated as the 114th Fighter Group on 16 March 1992 and became a part of the newly formed Air Combat Command on 1 June 1992.

=== Iraq ===
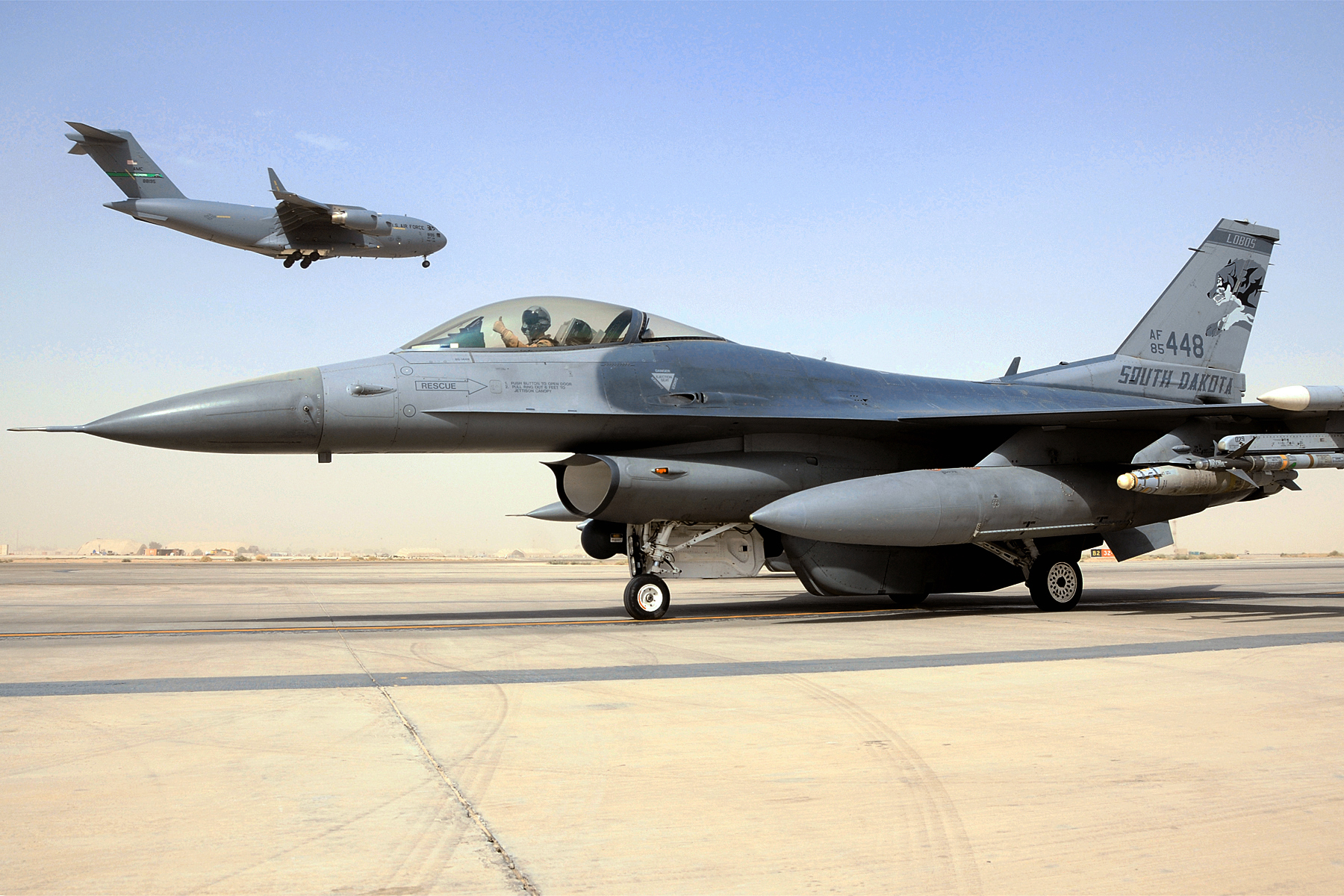
A 175th Fighter Squadron F-16 in Iraq during 2010

The unit was one of the first four Air National Guard units tasked to deploy in support of Operation Provide Comfort based out of Incirlik Air Base, Turkey. Combat air patrol missions were flown over the northern "No Fly" zone of Iraq from December 1993 to January 1994. The 114th Fighter Group was redesignated as the 114th Fighter Wing in October 1995. The unit subsequently supported Operation Northern Watch, based out of Turkey in 1995 and 2002, and Operation Southern Watch based out of Kuwait in 1998 and Saudi Arabia in 2001. The South Dakota ANG aircraft were also deployed to Belgium, Singapore, the Netherlands Antilles and Israel.

=== War on terror ===
A new chapter was opened in the history of the Air National Guard with the September 11 attacks, in 2001. In addition to the ongoing tasking as part of the Air Expeditionary Force, South Dakota ANG members were also activated to support Operation Noble Eagle within the United States along with Operation Enduring Freedom and Operation Iraqi Freedom abroad. Over two-thirds of the 114th FW 1,000 members have actively supported the war on terror either at home or abroad. Mobilization orders were received for members of the 114th Security Forces Squadron, Civil Engineering Squadron, Maintenance Squadron (Munitions) and Logistics Readiness Squadron (Transportation). Unit members deployed to the United Arab Emirates, Qatar, Oman, Kuwait, Saudi Arabia, Iraq, Jordan, Cyprus, Pakistan, Romania, Bosnia-Herzegovina, Turkey, Spain, France and Germany.

== See also ==
- South Dakota State Guard
- South Dakota Wing Civil Air Patrol
