= 175th Fighter Squadron =

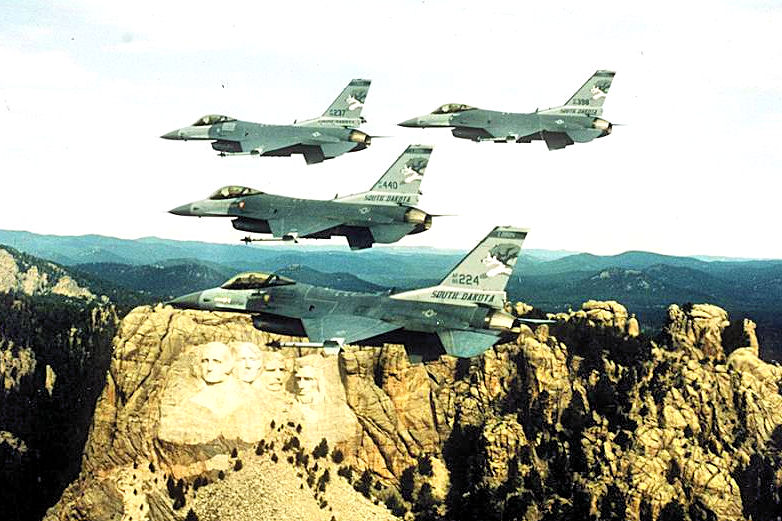
- Four 175th Fighter Squadron F-16s over Mount Rushmore
- Active: 1943–1945; 1946–1952; 1952–present
- Country: United States
- Allegiance: South Dakota
- Branch: Air National Guard
- Type: Squadron
- Role: Fighter
- Part of: South Dakota Air National Guard
- Garrison/HQ: Joe Foss Field Air National Guard Station, South Dakota
- Nickname: Fightin' Lobos
- Engagements: European Theater of Operations
- Decorations: Distinguished Unit Citation; Belgian Fourragère

Insignia
- 175th Fighter Squadron emblem

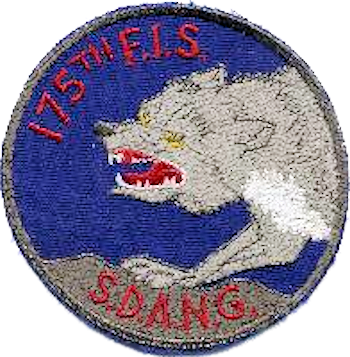
- 175th Fighter-Interceptor Squadron emblem
- Tail marking: Dark Grey stripe "Lobos" on tail; The front of a timber wolf running across the tail

The 175th Fighter Squadron is a unit of the South Dakota Air National Guard 's 114th Operations Group stationed at Joe Foss Field Air National Guard Station, Sioux Falls, South Dakota. The 175th is equipped with the F-16C/D Fighting Falcon.

== History ==
=== World War II ===
The squadron was first activated as the 387th Fighter Squadron, one of the original squadrons of the 365th Fighter Group at Richmond Army Air Base on 15 May 1943. The squadron trained with Republic P-47 Thunderbolts. The unit moved to RAF Gosfield, England in December 1943, where it became part of IX Fighter Command. The squadron's first mission, flown on 22 February, was a bomber support sweep of short duration over enemy-held territory. Early missions were flown in support of Eighth Air Force Boeing B-17 Flying Fortress and Consolidated B-24 Liberator bomber operations. Later, the 387th flew dive-bombing missions to attack such targets as bridges, aerodromes, rail facilities, gun positions, and V-weapon sites prior to the Operation Overlord, the landings at Normandy.

The 387th began its move to the Continent, taking up residence at Azeville Airfield, France on 27 June 1944 to provide tactical air for the United States First Army. On the Continent, the squadron moved rapidly from one airfield to another, eventually winding up at Fritzlar Airfield, Germany on V-E Day.

After the end of hostilities, the 387th Fighter Squadron took part in the disarmament program until June, then returned to the United States in September 1945, and was inactivated at Camp Myles Standish, Massachusetts on 22 September 1945.

=== South Dakota Air National Guard ===
On 24 May 1946, the United States Army Air Forces, in response to dramatic postwar military budget cuts imposed by President Harry S. Truman, allocated inactive unit designations to the National Guard Bureau for the formation of an Air Force National Guard. These unit designations were allotted and transferred to various State National Guard bureaus to provide them unit designations to re-establish them as Air National Guard units. The wartime 387th Fighter Squadron was redesignated as the 175th Fighter Squadron and allotted to the National Guard on 24 May 1946.

The War Department authorized the establishment of Air National Guard Squadrons, Groups and Wings in 48 States. The formation of a South Dakota – Iowa Air National Guard and assignment of Col. Frederick Gray Jr., who was a veteran fighter pilot having served with the Eighth Air Force and The RAF, as group instructor for both units, was announced by Brigadier General Charles H. Grahl, Iowa Adjutant General, at Des Moines, Iowa on 26 June 1946. Squadrons of the Air Force, each with 34 planes of various types, were located in Sioux Falls, at Sioux City and Des Moines, Iowa. Air Guardsmen under Col. Gray were trained to throw 102 planes into battle within 12 days. Lt. Col. Ted Arndt assistant to the Adjutant General surveyed local air field facilities, making note of buildings and installations to be needed by the new Air Force. The South Dakota Air National Guard 175th Fighter Squadron, with Thirteen officers, was approved by Col. E.A. Beckwith, Adjutant General, Rapid City, South Dakota on 20 September 1946. The 175th Fighter Squadron was assigned to the 132d Fighter Group, Des Moines, Iowa. The unit was equipped with the F-51D Mustang, and several types of support aircraft. 18 September 1947, however, is considered the South Dakota Air National Guard's official birth concurrent with the establishment of the United States Air Force as a separate branch of the United States military under the National Security Act.

After the 175th Fighter Squadron was organized and was extended federal recognition on 20 September 1946. The squadron was equipped with North American F-51D Mustangs and was assigned to several fighter groups in sequence, finally to the 133d Fighter Group of the Minnesota Air National Guard, although the squadron remained under the jurisdiction of the South Dakota Military Department. The mission of the 175th Fighter Squadron was to train for air defense.

==== Air Defense ====
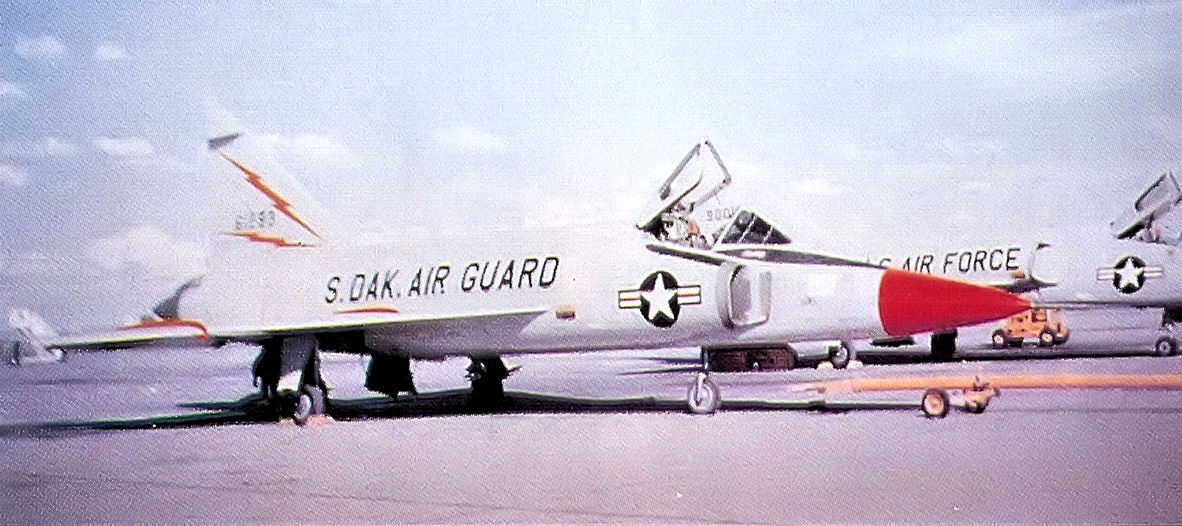
175th FIS F-102A 56-1293

On 2 March 1951 the 175th was federalized and brought to active duty due to the Korean War. It became the 175th Fighter-Interceptor Squadron and remained assigned to the 133d Fighter-Interceptor Group but now was part of Air Defense Command (ADC). In August it moved to Rapid City Air Force Base, South Dakota. Its mission was air defense of the area, particularly of the Convair B-36 Peacemaker bombers of the 28th Bombardment Wing stationed there. In a major reorganization of ADC responding to its difficulty under the existing wing base organizational structure in deploying fighter squadrons to best advantage, ADC replaced its groups and wings with regional organizations. The 133d Group was inactivated and the squadron was reassigned to the 31st Air Division on 6 February 1952. It was released from active duty on 1 December 1952 and its mission, personnel and aircraft were assumed by the 54th Fighter-Interceptor Squadron, which was activated the same day.

The squadron returned to the control of the State of South Dakota on 1 December 1952 and was activated at Sioux Falls the same day. In September 1953 the squadron began to keep two of its F-51D Mustangs on alert status 14 hours a day. On 1 November 1954, the 175th began the transition from the piston engine, propeller driven, F-51D to its first jet aircraft, the Lockheed F-94A Starfire interceptor.

On 16 April 1956, the 175th was reorganized on the model used by its gaining command, ADC, and the 114th Fighter Group was established. The 175th FIS became the group's flying squadron. Support units assigned to the group were the 114th Material Squadron, 114th Air Base Squadron and the 114th USAF Dispensary.

During the 1950s and 1960s, unit aircraft were upgraded by ADC as newer interceptors became available to the Air National Guard. Northrop F-89 Scorpions were received in 1958 and Convair F-102A Delta Dagger supersonic aircraft in 1960.

==== Tactical Air Command ====
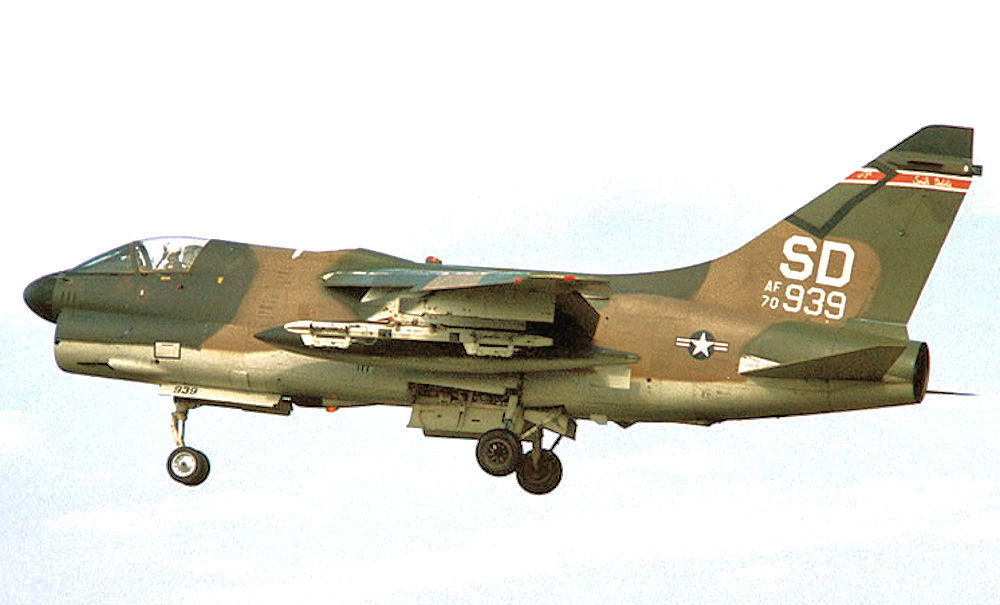
Squadron A-7D Corsair (Note: Aircraft is LTV A-7D Corsair II serial 70-939, taken about 1978.)

In 1970 ADC was reducing its interceptor force, as the chances of a bomber attack by the Soviet Union seemed remote in the age of Intercontinental ballistic missiles. The squadron was redesignated the 175th Tactical Fighter Squadron on 23 May 1970 when the gaining command for the 114th Group became Tactical Air Command (TAC). The 175th began receiving North American F-100 Super Sabre fighters that were being withdrawn from service in the Vietnam War.

News was received in March 1976 that the unit's F-100D aircraft would be replaced by LTV A-7D Corsair II jets. The last Super Sabres left Joe Foss Field in June 1977. In 1979, the unit began a 12-year era of participation in Operation Coronet Cove at Howard Air Force Base providing for defense of the Panama Canal. Both aircrew and support personnel deployed to Howard in the summer of 1979 during the Nicaraguan crisis. The unit was awarded an Armed Forces Expeditionary Streamer for combat duty as a part of Operation Just Cause, the operation to replace Manuel Noriega with a democratic government in Panama during 1989–1990.

TAC retiring the A-7D in the late 1980s, and National Guard units flying the Corsair II transitioned from the A-7 to the General Dynamics F-16 Fighting Falcon. The first F-16 for the 175th Squadron arrived on 14 August 1991. In June 1993 the squadron deployed eight aircraft to Brustem Air Base, Belgium in Operation Coronet Dart, supporting the European exercise Central Enterprise 1993.

In December 1993 the squadron deployed again, this time for their first combat deployment with the F-16. Stationed at Incirlik Air Base, Turkey, the squadron flew missions over Northern Iraq to guard the no-fly zone to protect Kurdish refugees. Combat air patrol missions were flown over the northern "No Fly Zone" of Iraq from December 1993 to January 1994.

The 114th Fighter Group was redesignated the 114th Fighter Wing in October 1995 when the National Guard adopted the Objective Wing organization of the regular Air Force, and the squadron was assigned to the 114th's new 114th Operations Group. The unit subsequently supported Operation Northern Watch, based out of Turkey in 1995 and 2002, and Operation Southern Watch flying from Kuwait in 1998 and Saudi Arabia in 2001.

==== Global War on Terrorism ====
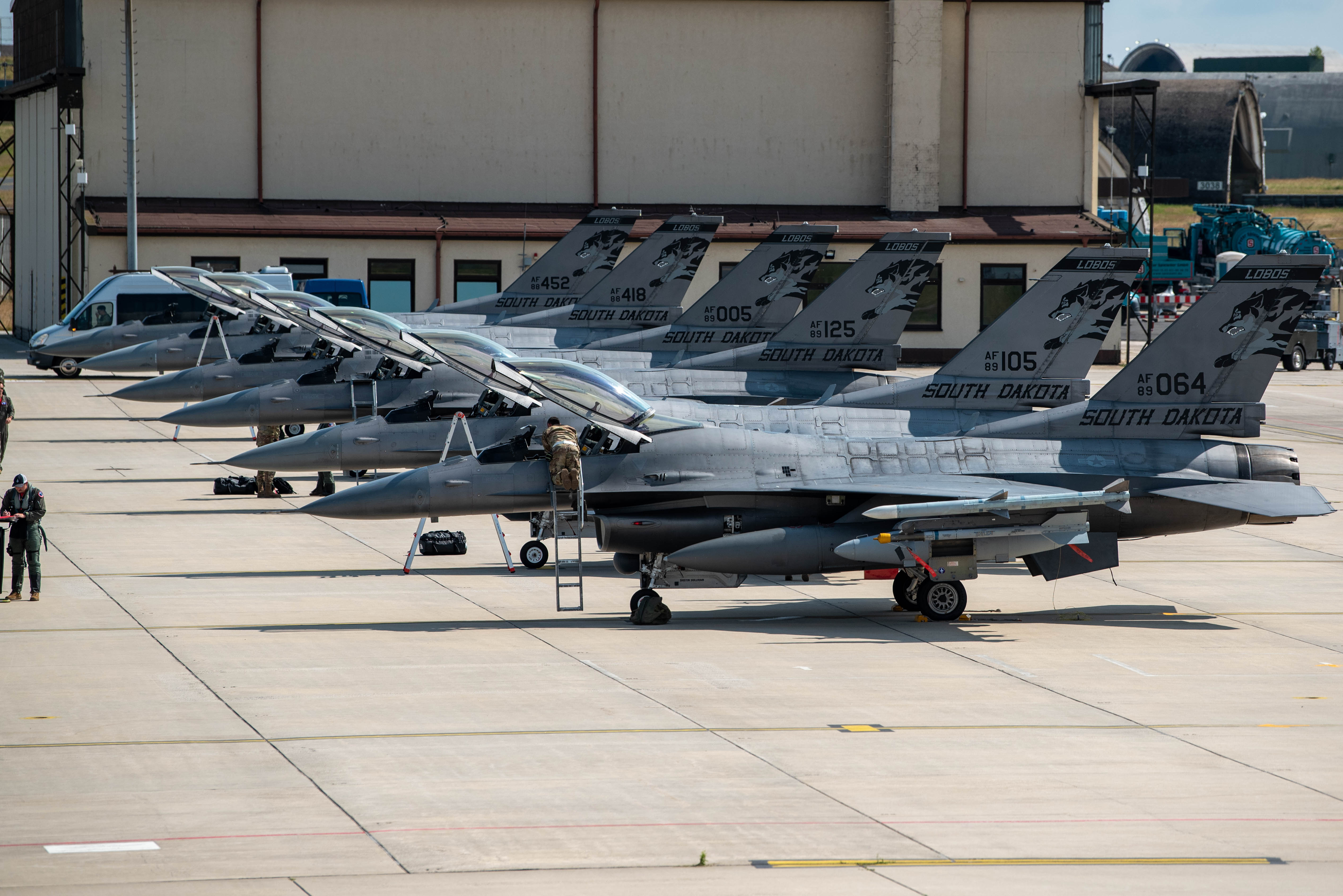
175th FS F-16Cs at Spangdahlem Air Base, Germany, 23 June 2023.

A new chapter was opened in the history of the Air National Guard with the terrorist attacks on America on 11 September 2001. In addition to the unit's ongoing tasking as part of the Air Expeditionary Force, unit members were activated to support Operation Noble Eagle, the activation of reservists to provide security within the United States and Operation Enduring Freedom, the Global War on Terrorism. Deployments during the 2000s included three to Balad Air Base, Iraq (October to December 2006; June to September 2008 and January to April 2010).

On 25 October 2005 an F-16 of the unit was attempting to take fuel from a McDonnell Douglas KC-10 Extender. The boom operator's accidental oscillation of the refueling boom caused damage to both aircraft. Both were able to land safely, but one jet suffered more than $930,000 of damage. During 2007 the squadron was the recipient of the National Guard Bureau's Winston P. Wilson Trophy. The trophy goes to the most outstanding Air National Guard unit and is awarded annually. Three years later the squadron would win the trophy again in 2010.

The 2005 Base Realignment and Closure Commission recommended that the 175th Fighter Squadron retire its older block 30 F-16s and upgrade to the block 40. The first F-16C block 30 to depart was Cujo (Note: F-16C serial 85-1434.) on 7 May 2010 for storage with the 309th Aerospace Maintenance and Regeneration Group. Over the next five months the 175th received Block 40 "Vipers" from all three squadrons of the 388th Fighter Wing at Hill Air Force Base, but predominantly from the inactivating 34th Fighter Squadron.

== Lineage ==
175th Fighter-Intercepor Squadron

- Constituted as the 387th Fighter Squadron (Single Engine) on 27 April 1943

Activated on 15 May 1943.
Inactivated on 22 September 1945
Redesignated 175th Fighter Squadron, Single Engine and allotted to the National Guard, on 24 May 1946
Activated and received federal recognition on 20 September 1946
Redesignated 175th Fighter-Interceptor Squadron on 2 March 1951
Federalized and placed on active duty, 1 April 1951
Inactivated and returned to South Dakota state control on 1 December 1952
Activated in November 1952
Inactivated on 23 May 1970
Consolidated with the 175th Tactical Fighter Squadron

175th Fighter Squadron
Constituted as the 175th Tactical Fighter Squadron on 1 May 1970
Activated on 23 May 1970
Consolidated with the 175th Fighter-Interceptor Squadron
Redesignated 175th Fighter Squadron on 15 March 1992

=== Assignments ===
- 365th Fighter Group, 15 May 1943 – 22 September 1945
- 132d Fighter Group, 20 September 1946
- 128th Fighter Group, 28 August 1947
- 133d Fighter Group (later 133d Fighter-Interceptor Group), 1 February 1951
- 31st Air Division, 6 February 1952
- 133d Fighter-Interceptor Group, 1 December 1952
- 114th Fighter Group, 15 April 1956 – 23 May 1970
- 114th Tactical Fighter Group (later 114th Fighter Group), 23 May 1970
- 114th Operations Group, 11 October 1995 – present

=== Stations ===
- Richmond Army Air Base, Virginia, 15 May 1943
- Langley Field, Virginia, 19 July 1943
- Dover Army Air Field, Delaware, 11 August 1943
- Richmond Army Air Base, Virginia, 18 November – 4 December 1943
- RAF Gosfield (AAF-154), England, 22 December 1943
- RAF Beaulieu (AAF-408), England, 5 March 1944
- Azeville Airfield (A-7), France, 27 June 1944
- Lignerolles Airfield (A-12), France, 15 August 1944
- Bretigny Airfield (A-48), France, 3 September 1944
- Juvincourt Airfield (A-68), France, 15 September 1944
- Chievres Airfield (A-84), Belgium, 4 October 1944
- Metz Airfield (Y-34), France, 27 December 1944
- Florennes/Juzaine Airfield (A-78), Belgium, 30 January 1945
- Aachen Airfield (Y-46), Germany, 16 March 1945
- Fritzlar Airfield (Y-86), Germany, 13 April 1945
- Suippes, France, (Ground Echelon) c. 29 July 1945
- Antwerp, Belgium, (Ground Echelon) c. 22 August – 11 September 1945
- Camp Myles Standish, Massachusetts, 20 – 22 September 1945
- Sioux Falls Municipal Airport, South Dakota, 20 September 1946
- Rapid City Air Force Base, South Dakota, 15 August 1951
- Sioux Falls Municipal Airport (later Sioux Falls Regional) Airport, Joe Foss Field Air National Guard Station), South Dakota, 1 December 1952 – present

=== Aircraft ===
- Republic P-47 Thunderbolt, 1943–1945
- North American P-51D (later F-51D) Mustang, 1946–1954
- Lockheed F-94A Starfire, 1954–1956
- Lockheed F-94B Starfire, 1954–1956
- Lockheed F-94C Starfire, 1956–1958
- Northrop F-89D Scorpion, 1958–1960
- Northrop F-89J Scorpion, 1960
- Convair F-102 Delta Dagger, 1960–1970
- Convair TF-102 Delta Dagger, 1960–1970
- North American F-100D Super Sabre, 1970–1977
- North American F-100F Super Sabre, 1970–1977
- LTV A-7D Corsair II, 1977–1992
- LTV A-7K Corsair II, 1977–1992
- General Dynamics F-16C Fighting Falcon, 1991–present
- General Dynamics F-16C Fighting Falcon, 1991–present

=== Deployments ===
- United States Forces Korea between May and September 2015.

== See also ==
- F-89 Scorpion units of the United States Air Force
- F-94 Starfire units of the United States Air Force
- List of F-100 units of the United States Air Force
- List of United States Air Force Aerospace Defense Command Interceptor Squadrons
- List of United States Air Force fighter squadrons
