= Joe Foss Field =

Joe Foss Field may refer to:

- Sioux Falls Regional Airport
- Marine Corps Air Station Miramar
