= 114th Fighter Wing =

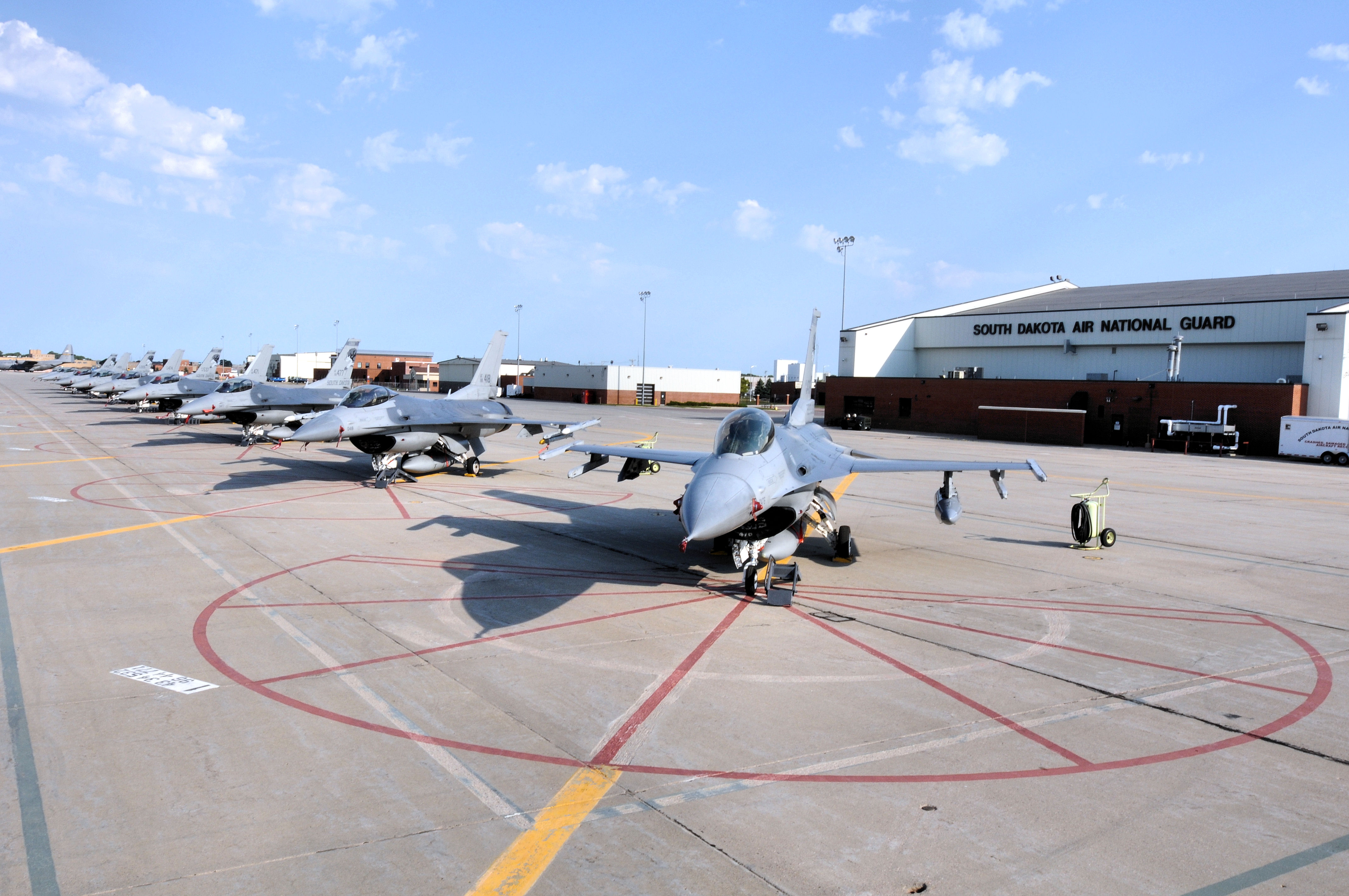
- 114th Fighter Wing Block 40 F-16 Fighting Falcons at Joe Foss Field AGS
- Active: 1956–present
- Country: United States
- Allegiance: South Dakota
- Branch: Air National Guard
- Type: Wing
- Role: Air Defense, Attack
- Part of: South Dakota Air National Guard
- Garrison/HQ: Sioux Falls Regional Airport (Joe Foss Field Air National Guard Station), South Dakota.
- Nickname: "Lobos"

Insignia
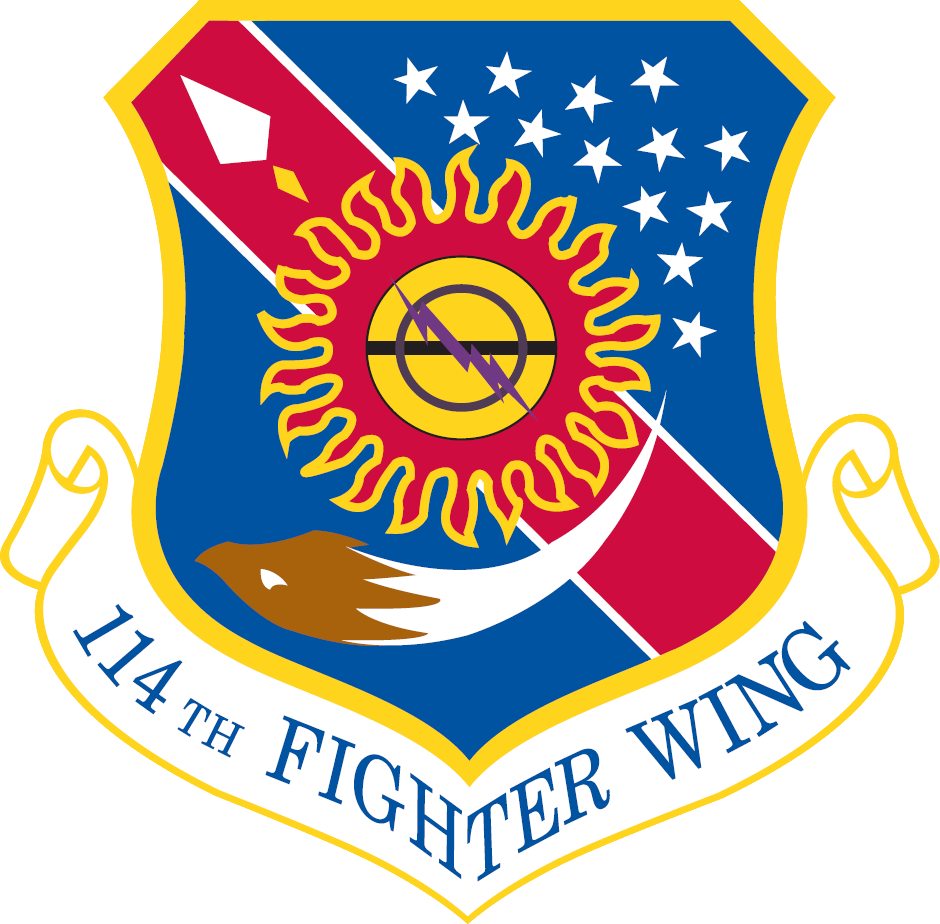
- 114th Fighter Wing emblem

The 114th Fighter Wing is a unit of the South Dakota Air National Guard, stationed at Joe Foss Field Air National Guard Station, Sioux Falls Regional Airport, Sioux Falls, South Dakota. If activated to federal service, the wing is gained by the United States Air Force Air Combat Command.

The wing is an Air Combat Command gained F-16C/D Fighting Falcon wing which deploys worldwide and executes fighter sorties to destroy enemy forces with conventional munitions.

== Units ==
The 114th FW consists of the following units:

- 114th Operations Group

175th Fighter Squadron

- 114th Maintenance Group
- 114th Mission Support Group
- 114th Medical Group

== History ==
On 16 April 1956, the South Dakota Air National Guard 175th Fighter-Interceptor Squadron was authorized to expand to a group level, and the 114th Fighter Group was established by the National Guard Bureau. The 175th FIS became the group's flying squadron. Other squadrons assigned to the group were the 114th Headquarters, 114th Material Squadron (Maintenance), 114th Combat Support Squadron, and the 114th USAF Dispensary.

During the 1950s and 1960s, the unit was upgraded by ADC as newer interceptors became available to the Air National Guard. F-89 Scorpions were received in 1958 and F-102A Delta Dagger supersonic aircraft in 1960.

=== Tactical Air Command ===
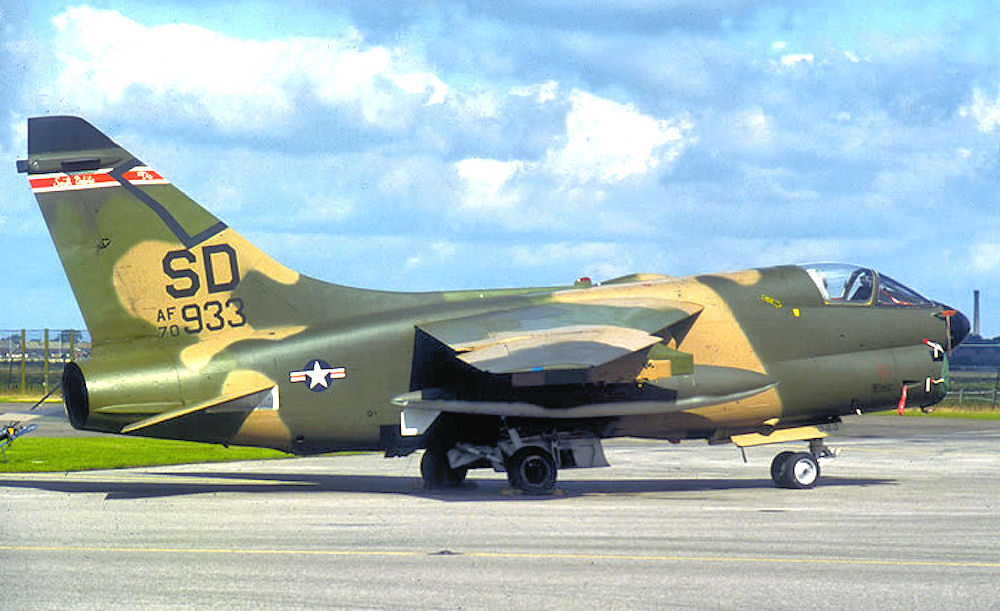
A-7D Corsair II 70-933, about 1980

In 1970, Aerospace Defense Command was reducing the CONUS interceptor force, as the chances of a bomber attack by the Soviet Union seemed remote in the age of Intercontinental ballistic missiles. The group was transferred to Tactical Air Command (TAC) on 23 May 1970 and was redesignated the 114th Tactical Fighter Group. The 175th Tactical Fighter Squadron began receiving F-100 Super Sabre tactical fighters that were being withdrawn from service in the Vietnam War.

News was received in March 1976 of the replacement of the unit's F-100D aircraft with A-7D Corsair II jets. The last Super Sabres left Joe Foss Field in June 1977. In 1979, the unit began a 12-year era of participation in Operation Coronet Cove at Howard Air Force Base providing for the defense of the Panama Canal. Both aircrew and support personnel were extended there in the summer of 1979 during the Nicaraguan crisis. The unit was awarded the Armed Forces Expeditionary Streamer for combat duty as a part of Operation Just Cause during 1989–1990.

Tactical Air Command began retiring the A-7D in the late 1980s, with units being transitioned from the A-7D/K to the F-16C/D block 30. The first F-16 to arrive with the 175th Fighter Squadron was on 14 August 1991. In June 1993 the squadron deployed eight aircraft to Brustem AB, Belgium as Coronet DART for the European exercise Central Enterprise 1993. In December 1993 the squadron deployed again, this time for their first combat deployment with the F-16. Stationed at Incirlik AB, Turkey the squadron flew missions over Northern Iraq to guard the no-fly zone to protect Kurdish refugees.

Combat patrol missions were flown over the northern "No Fly" zone of Iraq during Operation Provide Comfort from December 1993 to January 1994. The 114th Fighter Group was re-designated as the 114th Fighter Wing in October 1995. The unit subsequently supported Operation Northern Watch, based out of Turkey in 1995 and 2002, and Operation Southern Watch based out of Kuwait in 1998 and Saudi Arabia in 2001. The Fighting Lobos were also deployed to Belgium, Singapore, the Netherlands Antilles, and Israel.

=== Twenty-first century ===
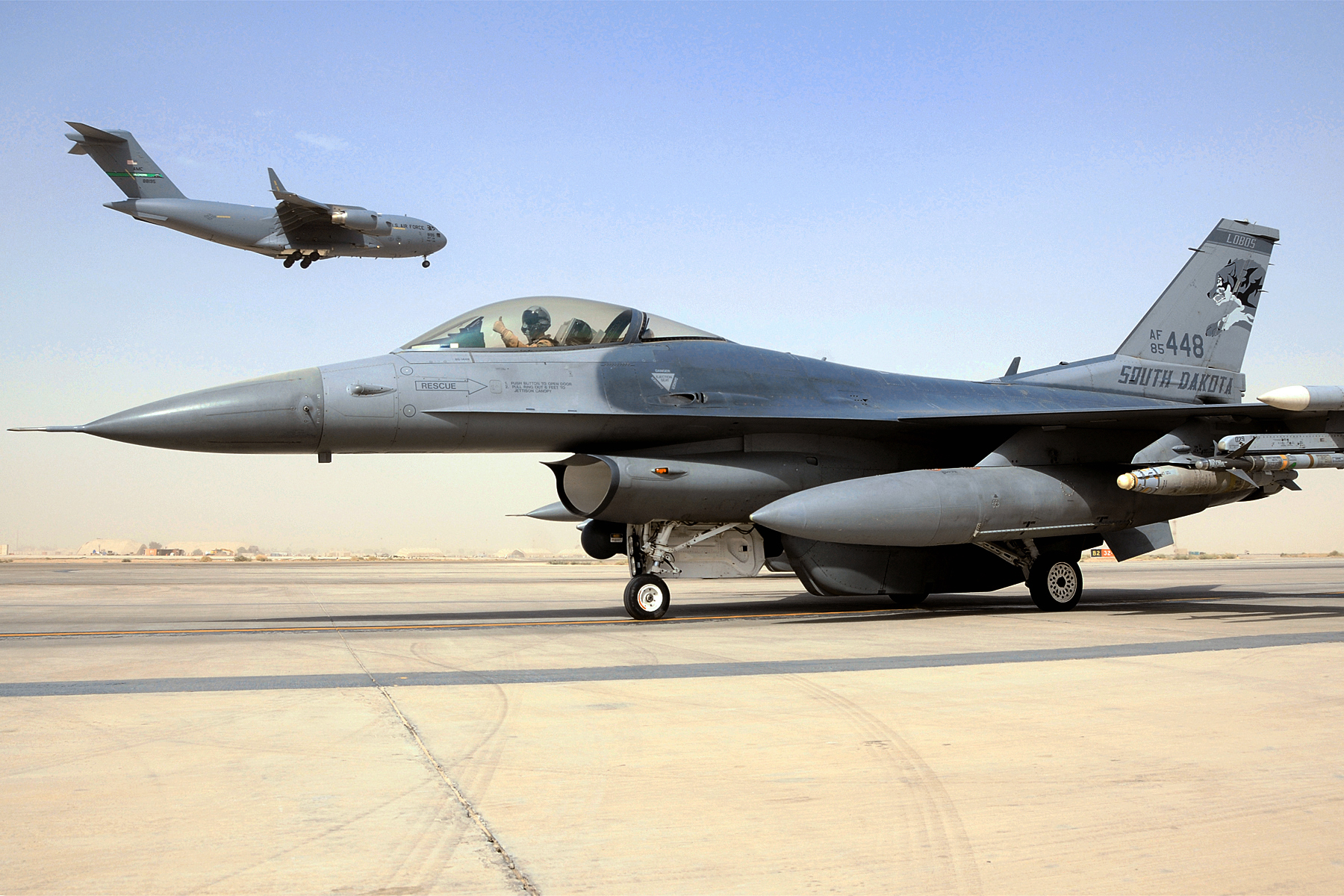
114th Fighter Wing F-16 at Balad AB, Iraq, 2010

A new chapter was opened in the history of the Air National Guard with the terrorist attacks on America on 11 September 2001. In addition to the unit's ongoing tasking as part of Air Expeditionary Force rotations, unit members were also activated to support Operation Noble Eagle within the United States and Operation Enduring Freedom. The unit also deployed to Iraq three times, to Balad AB, Iraq (October–December 2006; June–September 2008; January–April 2010. Unit members also deployed to the United Arab Emirates, Qatar, Oman, Kuwait, Saudi Arabia, Iraq, Jordan, Cyprus, Pakistan, Romania, Bosnia-Herzegovina, Turkey, Spain, France and Germany.

On 25 October 2005, an F-16 of the unit was attempting to take fuel from a McDonnell Douglas KC-10 Extender, when the boom operator's accidental oscillation caused damages to both aircraft, which were able to land safely. The jet suffered more than $930,000 of damage, an unusual accident for a squadron that has enjoyed a tremendous safety record. In 2007, the squadron received the National Guard Bureau's Winston P. Wilson Trophy, an annual award for the most outstanding Air National Guard unit. The squadron won the trophy again in 2010.

The 2005 Base Realignment and Closure Commission recommended that the 175th Fighter Squadron retire its older block 30 F-16s and upgrade to the block 40. The first F-16C block 30 to depart was 'Cujo' aircraft (#85-1434), which occurred on 7 May 2010 with destination AMARG. Over the next five months, they received block 40 Vipers from all three squadrons at Hill AFB, Utah which were largely as a result of the closure of the 34th Fighter Squadron.

In 2020 the wing trained in Canada during Exercise Maple Flag. In June 2023, the 114th FW deployed to Northern Germany, and participated in exercise Air Defender 23.

== Lineage ==
114th Fighter Group (Air Defense)

- Established as the 114th Fighter Group (Air Defense) and allotted to the Air National Guard

Activated on 16 April 1956 and extended federal recognition
Inactivated on 23 May 1970
Consolidated with the 114th Tactical Fighter Group

114th Fighter Wing

- Established as the 114th Tactical Fighter Group on 5 May 1970 and allotted to the Air National Guard

Activated on 23 May 1970
Consolidated with the 114th Fighter Group (Air Defense)
Redesignated 114th Fighter Group on 15 March 1992
Redesignated 114th Fighter Wing on 11 October 1995

=== Assignments ===
- 133d Air Defense Wing, 16 April 1956
- 132d Air Defense Wing, 1 December 1957
- South Dakota Air National Guard, 1 August 1964
- 132d Tactical Fighter Wing, 23 May 1970
- South Dakota Air National Guard, 16 October 1995

Gaining Commands

Air Defense Command (later Aerospace Defense Command), 16 April 1956
Tactical Air Command, 23 May 1970
Air Combat Command, 1 June 1992 – present

=== Components ===
- 114th Operations Group, 11 October 1995 – present
- 175th Fighter-Interceptor Squadron (later 175th Tactical Fighter, 175th Fighter Squadron), 16 April 1956 – 11 October 1995

=== Stations ===
- Sioux Falls Municipal Airport (later Sioux Falls Regional Airport, Joe Foss Field Air National Guard Station, South Dakota, 16 April 1956 – present

=== Aircraft ===
- F-94C Starfire, 1956–1958
- F-89D Scorpion, 1958–1960
- F-89J Scorpion, 1960
- F/TF-102 Delta Dagger, 1960–1970
- F-100D/F Super Sabre, 1970–1977
- A-7D/K Corsair II, 1977–1992
- Block 30 F-16C/D Fighting Falcon, 1991–2010
- Block 40 F-16C/D Fighting Falcon, 2010–Present

=== Deployments ===
- Operation Provide Comfort
- Maple Flag
- Operation Northern Watch
- Operation Southern Watch
- Operation Coronet Nighthawk
- Operation Freedom's Sentinel
- Operation Resolute Support
- Operation Iraqi Freedom
- Operation Enduring Freedom
- Operation Inherent Resolve
