= Jackson Hole Airport =

Airport in Teton County, Wyoming, United States

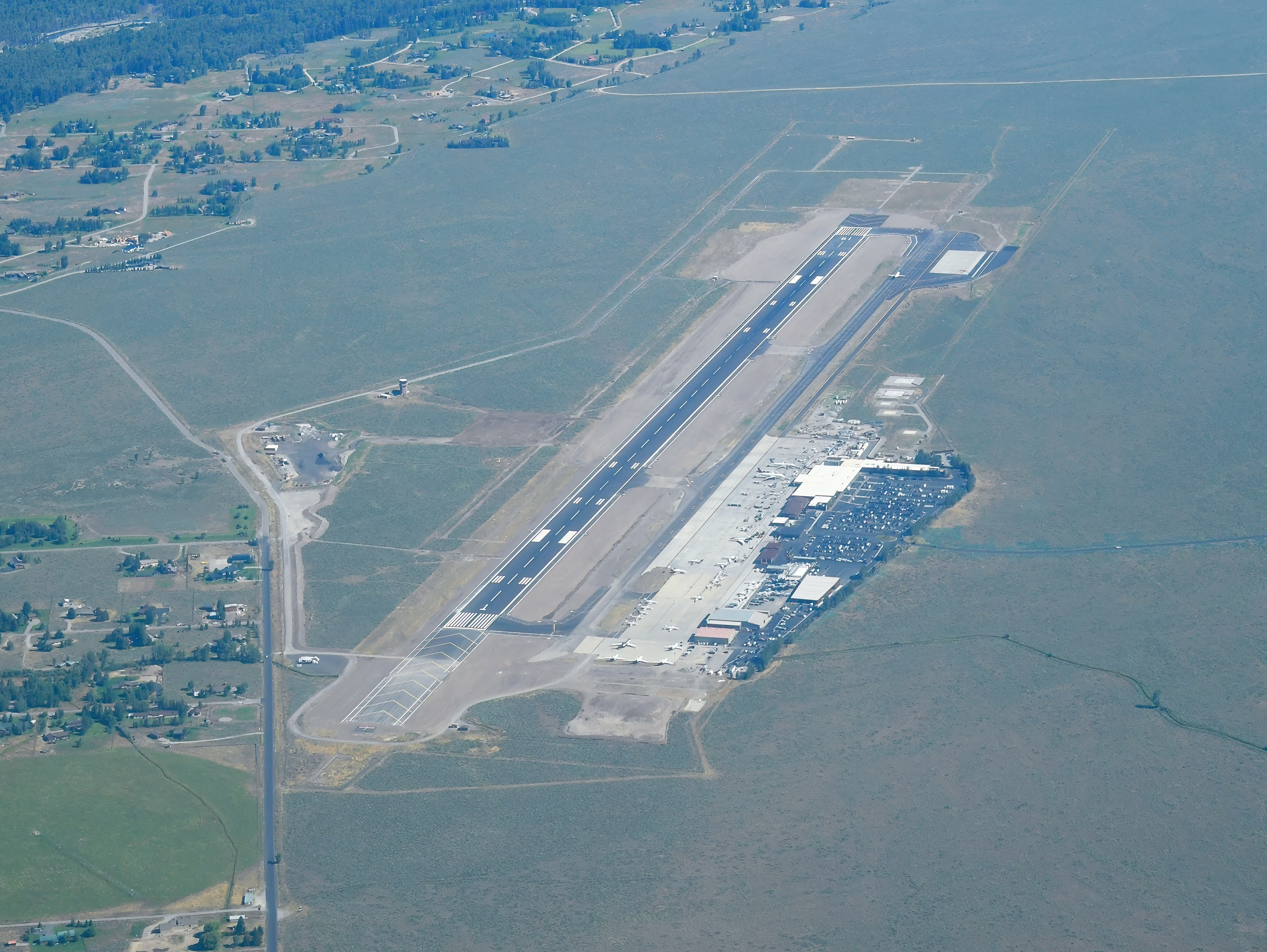
- IATA: JAC; ICAO: KJAC; FAA LID: JAC

Summary
- Airport type: Public
- Owner: Jackson Hole Airport Board
- Serves: Jackson Hole
- Elevation AMSL: 6,451 ft (1,966 m)
- Coordinates: 43°36′26″N 110°44′16″W
- Website: jacksonholeairport.com

Maps
- FAA airport diagram
- Interactive map of Jackson Hole Airport

Runways
Direction	Length		Surface
Direction	ft	m	Surface
1/19	6,300	1,920	Asphalt

Statistics (2025)
- Total Passengers: 1,161,320
- Aircraft takeoffs: 6,323
- Sources: Airport website, Bureau of Transportation Statistics, and Federal Aviation Administration

Jackson Hole Airport (IATA: JAC, ICAO: KJAC, FAA LID: JAC) is a public airport located seven miles (11 km) north of Jackson in unincorporated Teton County, Wyoming, U.S. In 2019, it was the busiest airport in Wyoming by passenger traffic with 455,000 passengers. During peak summer and winter seasons, Jackson Hole offers nonstop airline service from up to 15 destinations across the United States. The airport is served year-round by Alaska Airlines, American Airlines, Delta Air Lines, and United Airlines and seasonally by Sun Country Airlines.

Jackson Hole Airport is the only commercial airport in the United States located inside a national park – specifically, Grand Teton National Park. (The Provincetown Municipal Airport in Massachusetts is on land leased from the National Park Service, but it is not in a national park.)

== History ==
The airport was created in the 1930s as the best place to put an airport in Teton County. The airport was designated as part of a national monument in 1943 and merged with Grand Teton National Park in 1950. The runway was extended to its current length in 1959. President John F. Kennedy landed in an Army helicopter here on September 25, 1963. During the 1960s and 1970s an extension of the runway to 8,000 feet (2,400 m) was considered to accommodate jet aircraft, but the National Park Service successfully opposed the plan. In the late 1970s jets began using the existing runway. The area is noise sensitive and the airport allows no jets louder than stage III. The airport is an important habitat for the rare sage grouse during its mating season.

The original Frontier Airlines was the first carrier to serve Jackson Hole, starting in 1959 with routes to Denver, Salt Lake City, and Billings using Douglas DC-3s, and later the Convair 340 and 580. This was eventually upgraded to the Boeing 737-200 series aircraft shortly before the airline shut down in 1986 following the Airline Deregulation Act. Other than some commuter airlines that briefly served the airport, Frontier had the only service until Western Airlines began flights to Salt Lake City in 1983 using Boeing 737-200s. Since that time, the airport has also seen service from Continental Airlines, Northwest Airlines, Horizon Air, Big Sky Airlines, and Southwest Airlines in the past as well as many other commuter carriers.

The airport once had an unusual terminal resembling a pioneer log cabin. The terminal was completely rebuilt between 2009 and 2014. The new terminal, designed by Gensler, still blends with the unique surroundings of the national park with exposed wood, fireplaces, and nature photography throughout. The park limited the height of the terminal building to 18 feet (5.5 m). The terminal design received an American Institute of Architects Honor Award in 2014. In the spring of 2021, construction began on relocating the pre-security Café to baggage claim. This relocation created additional check-in counter space for Allegiant Airlines. In 2021, Allegiant left the airport due to small flight loads and the inability to reliably turn a profit at the airport. The next phase of construction will modernize and expand the TSA checkpoint and give more gate space to American Airlines. In the spring of 2022 when the airport is closed, construction will commence on rebuilding Jedediah's restaurant and adding two more gates.

Between 2001 and 2023, Jackson Hole Airport employed its security screeners under contract with the Transportation Security Administration's Screening Partnership Program, and was the only airport that directly employed its security screeners. Airport screening operations transitioned to the TSA in May 2023.

== Facilities ==
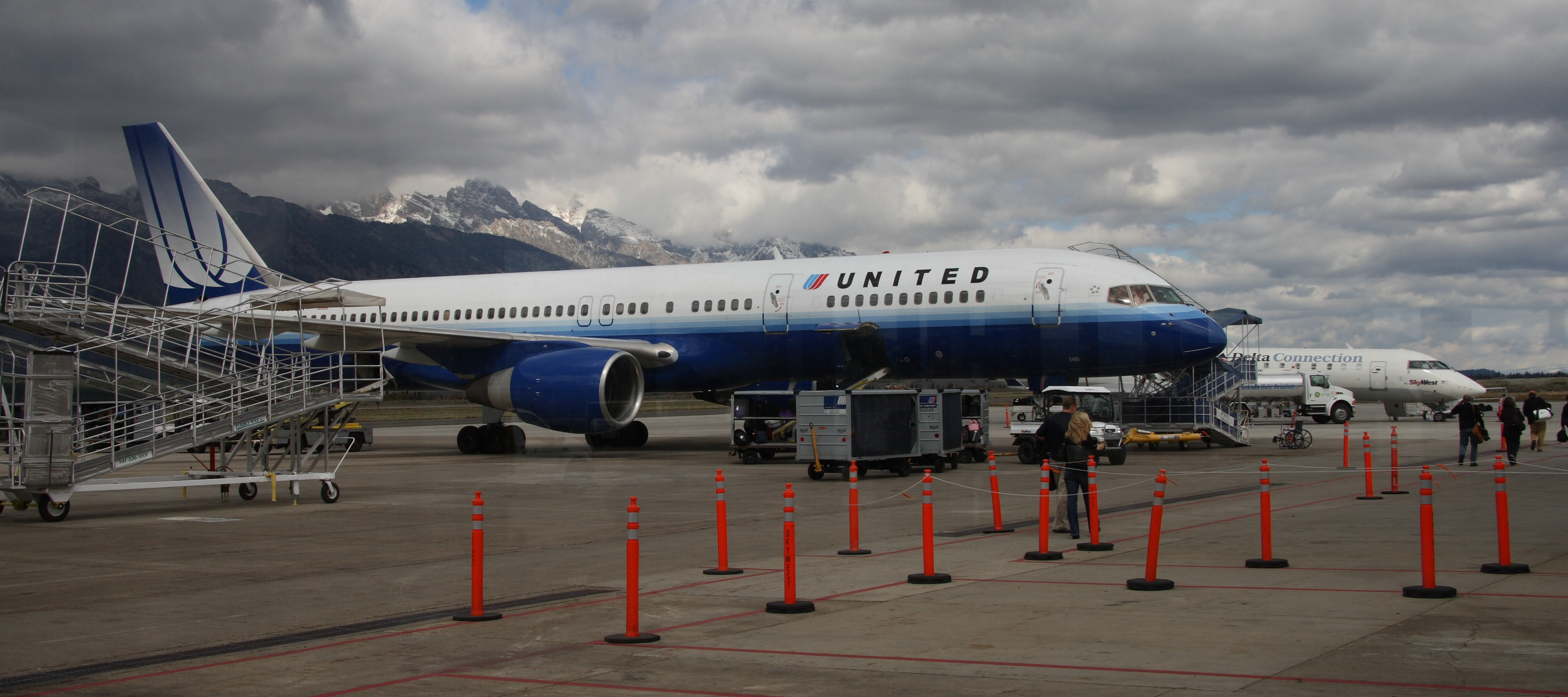
Ramp at Jackson Hole Airport (2007)

Jackson Hole Airport covers 533 acres (216 ha); its one runway, 1/19, is 6,300 ft × 150 ft (1,920 m × 46 m) asphalt.

Jackson Hole Airport is noise sensitive and bans older, noisier aircraft with stage-II engines.

Due to a short runway at high altitude, the largest aircraft seen regularly at the Jackson Hole Airport is the Boeing 757-200 operated by Delta Air Lines on flights to Atlanta. Other aircraft typically seen include the Airbus A319, A320, Embraer 175, and the Bombardier CRJ700. Due to these conditions, Jackson Hole Airport does not typically see stretched versions of aircraft such as the Airbus A321 or Boeing 737-900, as they become weight restricted when taking off.

The airport currently has eleven hard stand gates and three baggage carousels. Jackson Hole Airport does not have jet bridges so passengers board aircraft via ramps. The airport terminal has a restaurant with bar and concessions, Jedediah's at the Airport, in addition to the Grand Teton Park Bookshop after security. The airport is served by Alamo, Avis, Budget, Enterprise and National rental car companies. Dollar, Hertz, and Thrifty offer shuttle service from the airport to in-town rental cars.

The airport has an antler arch at the entrance to terminal from the taxiway similar to the one in the town square.

== Airlines and destinations ==
Airlines	Destinations
Alaska Airlines	Seasonal: Portland (OR), San Diego, San Francisco, Seattle/Tacoma
American Airlines	Dallas/Fort Worth; Seasonal: Charlotte, Chicago–O'Hare, New York–JFK
American Eagle	Seasonal: Los Angeles
Delta Air Lines	Salt Lake City; Seasonal: Atlanta, Minneapolis/St. Paul
Delta Connection	Salt Lake City; Seasonal: Los Angeles
United Airlines	Denver; Seasonal: Boston (begins February 13, 2027), Chicago–O'Hare, Houston–Intercontinental, Newark, San Francisco, Washington–Dulles
United Express	Denver; Seasonal: Los Angeles

Destinations map
Destinations from Jackson Hole Airport
Red = Year-round destination
Green = Seasonal destination
Blue = Future destination

=== Top destinations ===
Busiest domestic routes from KJAC (February 2025 – January 2026)
Rank	City	Passengers	Carriers
1	Denver, Colorado	157,520	United
2	Salt Lake City, Utah	101,870	Delta
3	Dallas/Fort Worth, Texas	80,610	American
4	Chicago–O'Hare, Illinois	80,130	American, United
5	Los Angeles, California	33,040	American, Delta, United
6	Atlanta, Georgia	28,000	Delta
7	San Francisco, California	27,350	Alaska, United
8	Newark, New Jersey	22,440	United
9	Charlotte, North Carolina	13,510	American
10	Seattle/Tacoma, Washington	9,870	Alaska

=== Airline market share ===
Largest airlines at JAC (February 2025 – January 2026)
Rank	Airline	Passengers	Share
1	United Airlines	463,000	40.61%
2	American Airlines	265,000	23.23%
3	Delta Air Lines	218,000	19.17%
4	SkyWest Airlines	194,000	16.99%

== Accidents and incidents ==
- On September 11, 1988, a Snowy Butte Aviation Beechcraft Super King Air nosedived and crashed during a nighttime take off due to pilot fatigue and spatial disorientation. The sole occupant, the pilot, was killed.
- On August 17, 1996, a U.S. Air Force C-130 Hercules aircraft assigned to the 317th Airlift Group at Dyess AFB, Texas was unable to clear Sheep Mountain, crashing into it and killing all nine aboard. The aircraft was supporting the United States Secret Service as part of visit by President Bill Clinton to the area.
- On December 20, 2000, actress and resident Sandra Bullock survived the crash of a chartered business jet at Jackson Hole Airport. The aircraft hit a snowbank instead of the runway, shearing off the nose gear and nose cone and damaging the wings.
- On June 27, 2005, John T. Walton, son of Walmart founder Sam Walton, died when his CGS Hawk Arrow homebuilt aircraft (registered as an "experimental aircraft" under FAA regulations) that he was piloting crashed in Jackson, Wyoming. Walton's plane crashed at 12:20 p.m. local time (1820 GMT) shortly after taking off from Jackson Hole Airport.

== Gallery ==
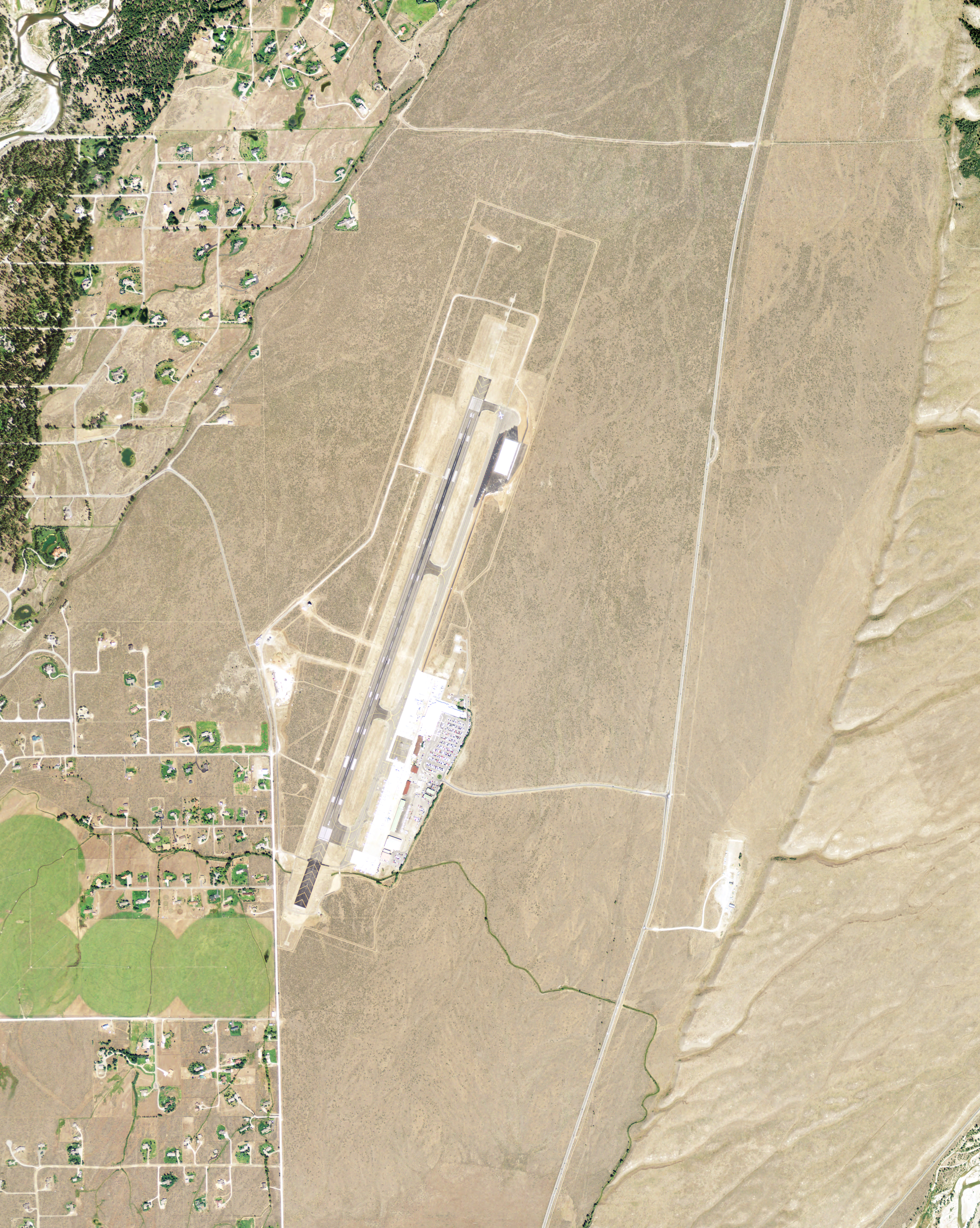
Aerial photo of airport

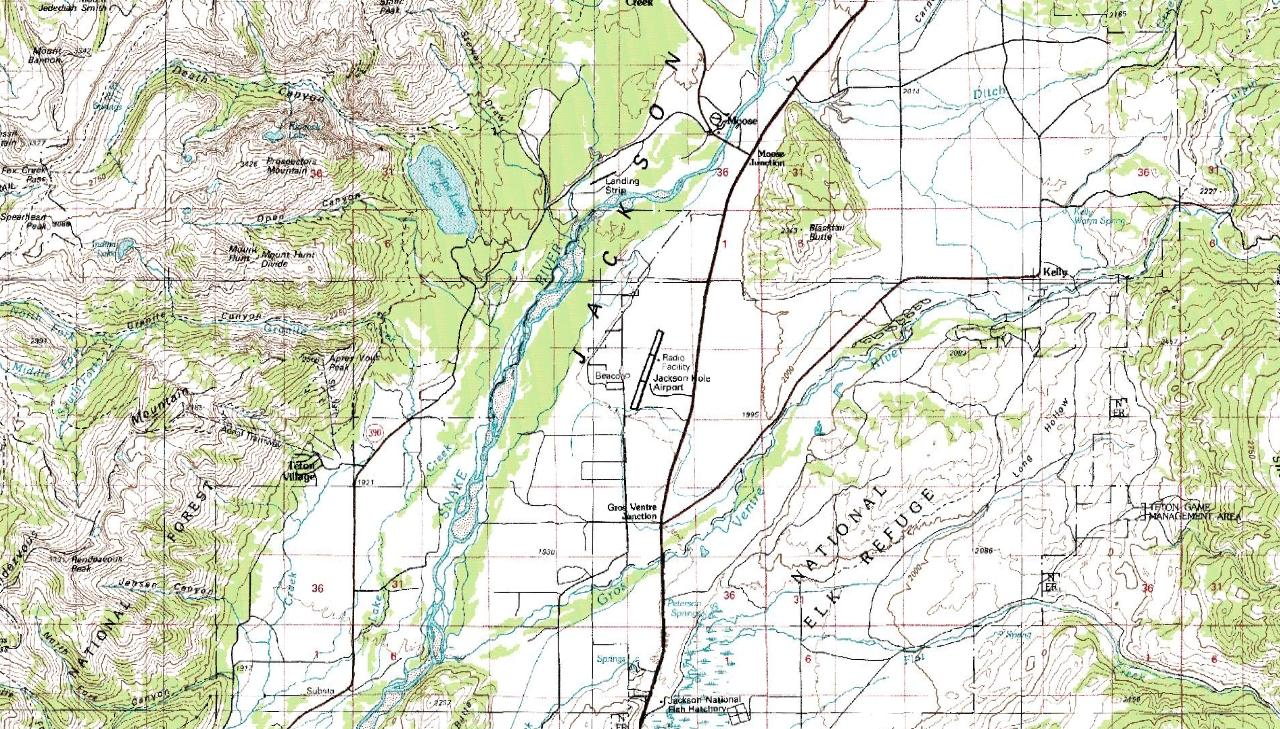
Map showing the airport

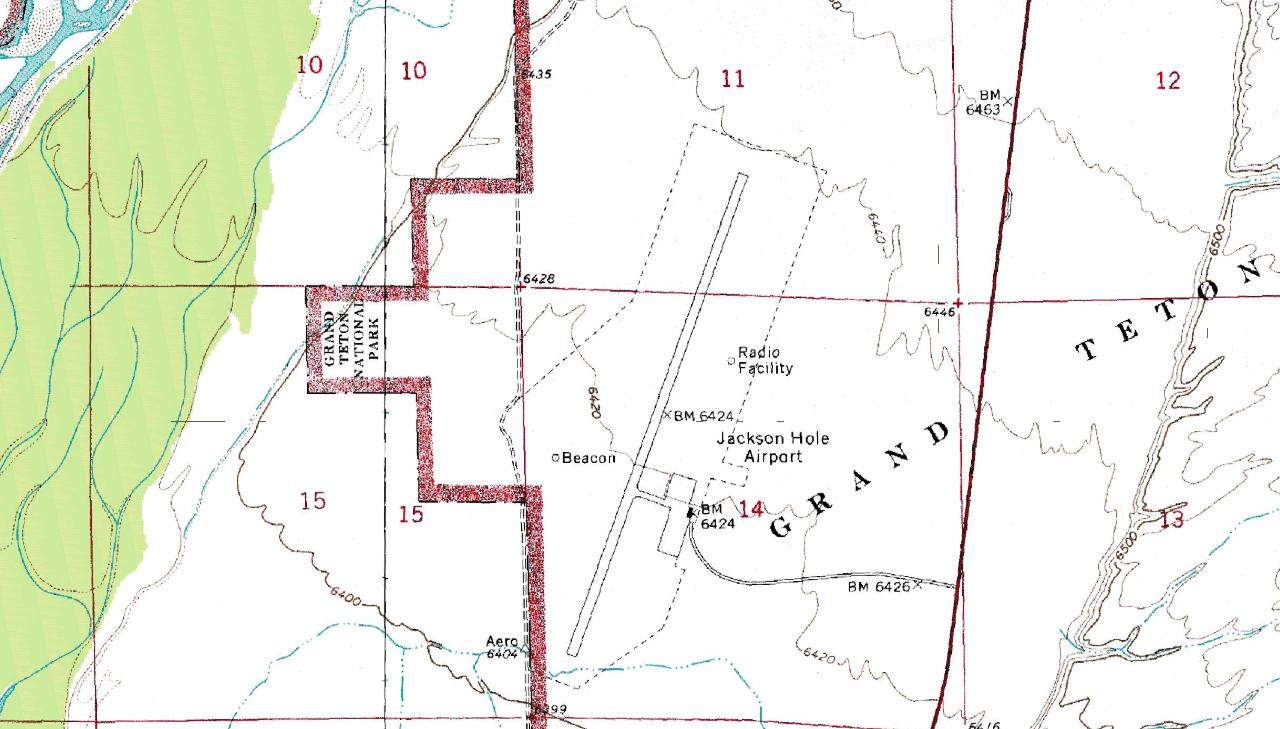
Closeup of airport map

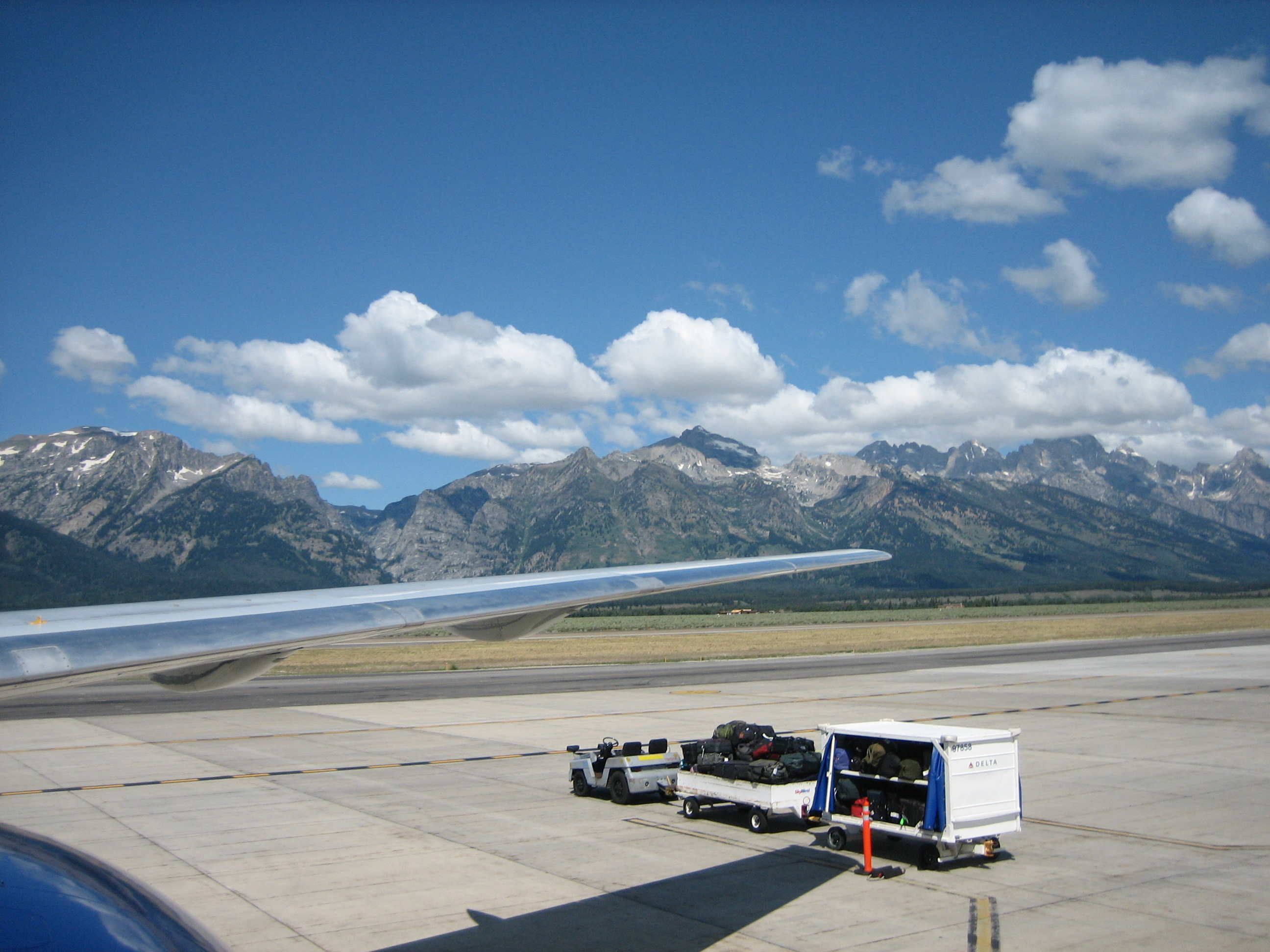
View of the Tetons from the ramp

== See also ==
- List of airports in Wyoming
