= Covenant Aviation Security =

US aviationsecurity services company

- Type: LLC
- Industry: Security
- Founded: 2002
- Headquarters: Chicago, Illinois, United States
- Key people: Michael Bolles, President
- Services: Provides security services to the aviation industry
- Website: covenantsecurity.com

Covenant Aviation Security, LLC (CAS) is a Chicago-based company that provides security services to the aviation industry. Michael Bolles has been its president since July 2012.

== Activities ==
Covenant Aviation Security provides airport security services under the Transportation Security Administration's Screening Partnership Program (SPP).

In 2005, the U.S. Department of Homeland Security designated CAS airport passenger and baggage screening services as anti-terrorist technology under the Support Anti-terrorism by Fostering Effective Technologies Act of 2002. Also that year, CAS was awarded the screening contract at Sioux Falls International Airport (FSD). CAS provides security services at John F. Kennedy International Airport, LaGuardia Airport, Orlando International Airport, and San Francisco International Airport.

== Locations ==
Covenant is one of the largest providers of security screening under contract with the TSA under the Screening Partnership Program.

=== Former locations ===
- San Francisco International Airport (SFO) – San Francisco/San Mateo County, California (replaced by VDM of Xcelerate Solutions in December 2026)
- The TSA also awarded contracts to nine airports formerly contracted with Covenant to other companies in 2015.
- Tupelo Regional Airport (TUP) – Tupelo, Mississippi (replaced by Trinity Technology Group, Inc. in May 2006 and VMD-MT Security LLC in August 2012)
- Sioux Falls Regional Airport (FSD) – Sioux Falls, South Dakota (replaced by Trinity Technology Group, Inc. in September 2011)
- Sidney-Richland Municipal Airport (SDY) – Sidney, Montana (replaced by Trinity Technology Group, Inc. in August 2009)
- Glendive Dawson Community Airport (GDV) – Glendive, Montana (replaced by Trinity Technology Group, Inc. in August 2009)
- Glasgow Valley County Airport (GGW) – Glasgow, Montana (replaced by Trinity Technology Group, Inc. in August 2009)
- Havre City County Airport (HVR) – Havre, Montana (replaced by Trinity Technology Group, Inc. in August 2009)
- L. M. Clayton Airport (OLF) – Wolf Point, Montana (replaced by Trinity Technology Group, Inc. in August 2009)
- Lewistown Municipal Airport (LWT) – Lewistown, Montana (replaced by Trinity Technology Group, Inc. in August 2009)
- Miles City Airport (MLS) – Miles City, Montana (replaced by Trinity Technology Group, Inc. in August 2009)

== Industry affiliations ==
American Association of Airport Executives (AAAE) is the world's largest professional organization for airport executives, representing thousands of airport management personnel at public-use commercial and general aviation airports. AAAE's members represent some 850 airports and hundreds of companies and organizations that support airports. AAAE serves its membership through results-oriented representation in Washington, D.C., and delivers an industry services and professional development opportunities including training, meetings and conferences, and an accreditation program.

Airports Council International – North America (ACI-NA) – The ACI-NA represents local, regional and state governing bodies that own and operate commercial airports in the United States and Canada. The ACI-NA's members enplane more than 95 percent of the domestic and virtually all the international airline passenger and cargo traffic in North America. The mission of the ACI-NA is to advocate policies and provide services that strengthen the ability of commercial airports to serve their passengers, customers and communities.

National Safe Skies Alliance (SafeSkies). National Safe Skies Alliance, Inc. (Safe Skies) is a non-profit organization that works with airports, government, and industry to maintain an aviation security system.

== Incidents and concerns ==
=== Undercover tests of screeners ===
A November 2006 report by the Department of Homeland Security Office of Inspector General found that TSA officials had collaborated with CAS at San Francisco International Airport to tip off CAS screeners to undercover tests. The tests were used to determine whether the screeners were properly inspecting passengers and their carry-on luggage at security checkpoints. From August 2003 until May 2004, precise physical descriptions of the undercover personnel who were on their way to test checkpoints were communicated to the screeners. According to the San Francisco Chronicle, the report stated that TSA officials and Covenant managers at the airport "notified screening personnel in advance when a tester was approaching a checkpoint and provided their descriptions." An article in the newspaper about a wrongful firing lawsuit related to the events further reported that according to allegations in the lawsuit "Posing as passengers, the decoys try to take dummy bombs, unloaded guns and other contraband through the airport's security checkpoints. But the lawsuit said Covenant tracked the decoys via closed-circuit television cameras and tipped off workers at security gates to expect a test." The handing out of descriptions was then stopped, but until January 2005 screeners were still alerted whenever undercover operations were being undertaken. CAS was rehired with a $314 million, four-year contract at the airport, and while employees of the firm and TSA were disciplined, none lost their jobs. The similar occurrence of Security being warned of test was reported at the Orlando International Airport, as being a regular warning with different descriptions of these undercover agents each time. Mississippi Representative Bennie Thompson said the report was troubling, observing: "How is the public expected to have any confidence in the screening systems when managers game the system?"

=== Campaign contributions ===
In November 2010, Fox News reported that Representative John Mica (R-Fla), who was pushing for airports to use private contractors in lieu of the TSA, had since 2006 received $1,700 from Gerald Berry in campaign contributions. Mica's spokesman said the contributions had not improperly influenced Mica.

== See also ==
- FirstLine Transportation Security
