= Sioux Falls Regional Airport =

Airport in South Dakota, United States

Sioux Falls Regional Airport Joe Foss Field

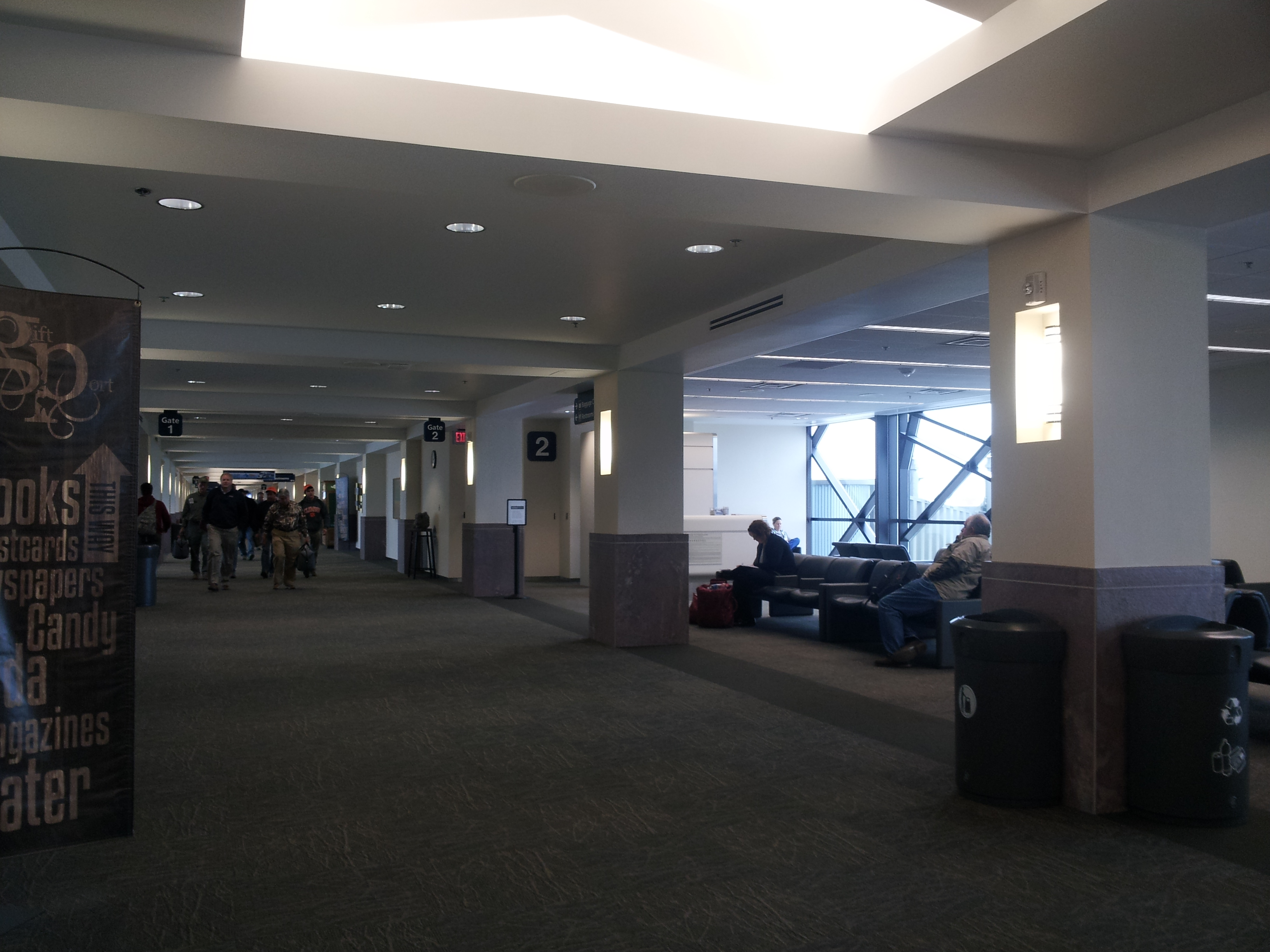
- IATA: FSD; ICAO: KFSD; FAA LID: FSD

Summary
- Airport type: Public
- Owner: City of Sioux Falls
- Operator: Sioux Falls Regional Airport Authority
- Serves: Sioux Falls, South Dakota & Southwest Minnesota
- Hub for: Alpine Air Express; Bemidji Airlines
- Elevation AMSL: 1,430 ft (440 m)
- Coordinates: 43°34′55″N 096°44′31″W
- Website: sfairport.com

Map
- Interactive map of Sioux Falls Regional Airport

Runways
Direction	Length		Surface
Direction	ft	m	Surface
03/21	9,000	2,743	Concrete
15/33	8,000	2,438	Concrete
09/27	3,148	960	Concrete

Helipads
Number	Length		Surface
Number	ft	m	Surface
H1	50	15	Asphalt

Statistics (2025)
- Total passengers: 1,505,874 ▲5.6%
- Aircraft operations: 54,679
- Sources: Airport website, FAA

Sioux Falls Regional Airport (IATA: FSD, ICAO: KFSD, FAA LID: FSD), also known as Joe Foss Field, is a public and military use airport three miles north of Sioux Falls, South Dakota, United States. It is named in honor of aviator and Sioux Falls native Joe Foss, who later served as the 20th Governor of South Dakota (1955–1959).

The National Plan of Integrated Airport Systems for 2011–2015 categorized it as a primary commercial service airport since it has over 10,000 passenger boardings (enplanements) per year. Federal Aviation Administration records say the airport had 423,288 enplanements in calendar year 2011, an increase of 18.92% from 355,939 in 2010.

Joe Foss Field Air National Guard Station is home to Headquarters, South Dakota Air National Guard and its 114th Fighter Wing (114 FW). The 114 FW is an Air Combat Command gained unit known as the "Fighting Lobos" and operates F-16C/D aircraft. The South Dakota Adjutant General is based in Camp Rapid in Rapid City, South Dakota, but the South Dakota Air National Guard is effectively headquartered with the 114 FW.

== History ==
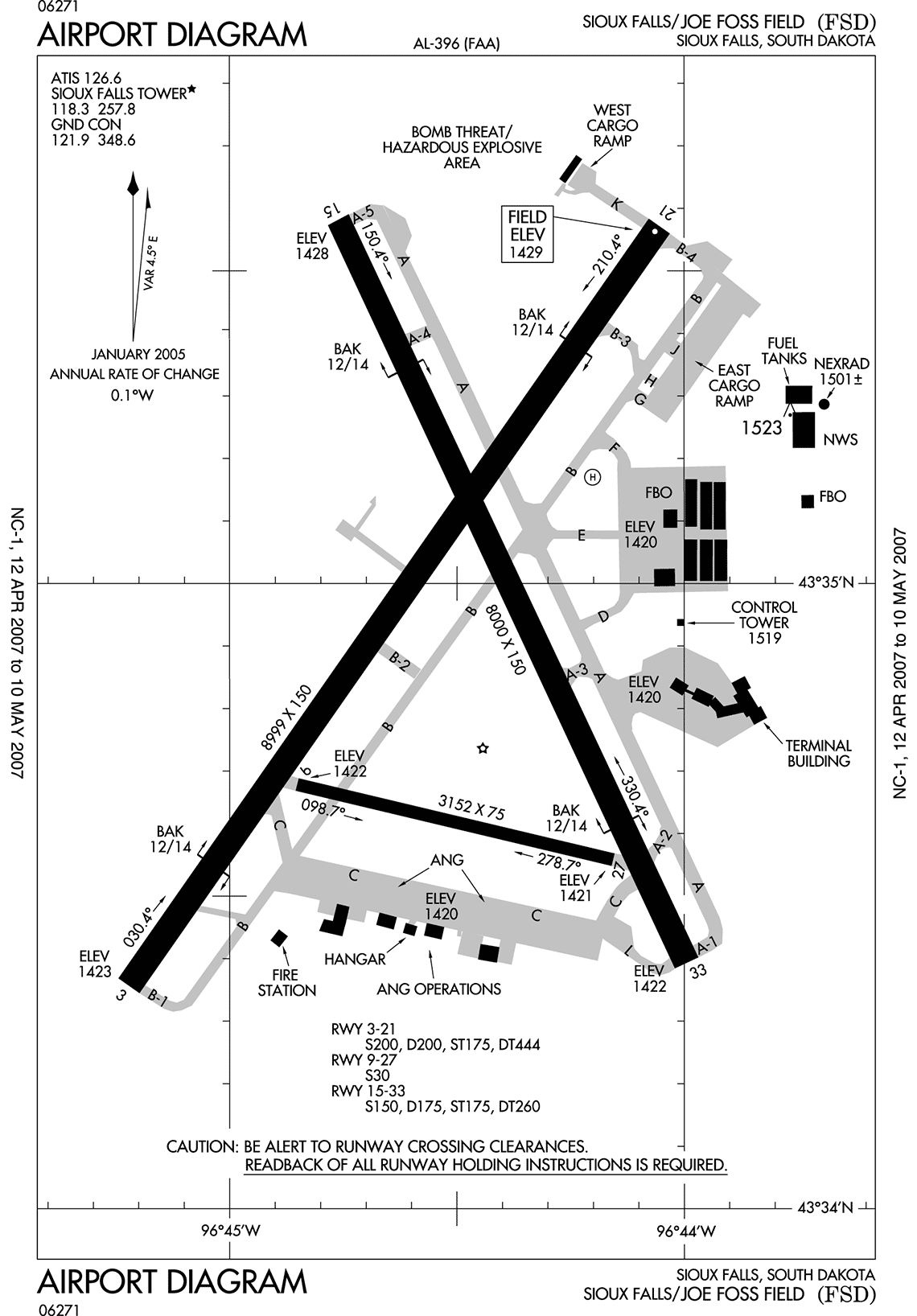
Runway layout at FSD

Sioux Falls Regional Airport was built on its present site as an airfield in 1937. In early 1942, the city approached the Federal Government and later leased the airport and surrounding property to become the Sioux Falls Army Air Field. The major function of the base was the establishment of a radio operator training facility. Between 1942 and 1945, about 40,000 radio operators were trained in Sioux Falls. The base was also a logistical supply center and its grid of streets now make up an industrial area just south of the present day airport. In 1946 the airport and surrounding land was transferred back to the city and the South Dakota Air National Guard was established under the direction of future airport namesake Joe Foss. The Air National Guard Base portion of the airport is south and west of the commercial and general aviation areas, north of Russell Street, and has all the standard facilities of a small USAF installation except for family housing. The 114th's F-16C and F-16D aircraft are a frequent sight over the Sioux Falls area, conducting training flights and routine operations.

Mid-Continent Airlines established the airport's first airline flights around 1940; the airline's successor, Braniff, left the airport about 1967. Western Airlines arrived in 1955, North Central in 1957, and Ozark in 1962. By 1992, the airport had 28 daily flights from eight airlines.

In 2005, Sioux Falls Regional Airport became one of the first airports in the country to de-federalize its workforce. Covenant Aviation Security previously provided baggage and passenger screening under contract with the Transportation Security Administration under the Screening Partnership Program. Currently, the Trinity Technology Group provides security screening functions.

== Facilities ==
Joe Foss Field covers 1,570 acres (635 ha) at an elevation of 1,430 feet (436 m). It has three concrete runways: 3/21 is 9,000 by 150 feet (2,743 x 46 m), 15/33 is 8,000 by 150 feet (2,438 x 46 m), and 9/27 is 3,148 by 75 feet (960 x 23 m) by 150 feet. It has one asphalt helipad, H1, 50 by 50 feet (15 x 15 m).

The terminal has seven gates, all with loading bridges. Five gates can accommodate up to an Airbus A320 family or Boeing 737 family size aircraft, gate number 5 can accommodate up to a Boeing 757, and gate number 2 can only accommodate a CRJ 200 or ERJ-145. CBP facilities exist for general aviation and cargo use, but large charter and scheduled passenger are not accepted.

== Renovations ==
The Costello Terminal building opened in 1970 and has undergone numerous renovations over the years including ones in 1990, 2003 and 2005.

Beginning in the spring of 2009, the Sioux Falls Regional Airport embarked on a three-phase, multi-year, multi-million-dollar renovation and expansion project, designed by Koch Hazard Architects to update the look and feel of the airport. Projects included renovating and expanding the ticketing and check-in counter area, moving all TSA screening equipment behind the ticketing counters into a more secure location, renovating and relocating the ground floor gift shop, updating and renovating the concourse, adding a new business lounge, renovating the restaurant in the upper concourse, installing three new jet bridges, and updating and re-configuring the airport's parking operations. By 2012, these projects were completed and more improvements were announced. From March to October 2012, the terminal's lower level restaurant was overhauled and renovated to become Wildcat Corner. Another long-term parking lot was built due to high demand; from August to September 2012, the airport was closed over a course of four weekends to almost all air traffic to allow a runway intersection to be rebuilt. In 2014 work began to replace the dated escalators, to open and finish renovating the lobby of the terminal, and expand the security checkpoint. That same year, work also commenced on an onsite hotel attached to the north end of the current terminal building. The hotel mainly caters to business travelers and has about 70 rooms.

Future projects include construction of additional holding aprons for aircraft at the end of each runway, continued pavement rehabilitation, completion of a west side access road, improvements to airport parking, a new control tower, new landing and updated navigational aids for all runways, additional land easements for flood control, runway safety zones, conservation efforts, an additional baggage carousel, a parking ramp and a new concourse.

A large terminal expansion was announced in November 2022 which will add multiple gates and two additional departure lounges. Construction is tentatively anticipated to begin in 2025 or 2026.

== Airlines and destinations ==
Since 2012, the commercial airlines serving the airport have remained unchanged. However, several of the airlines have added new destinations or modified existing service on established routes. Allegiant introduced service to five new cities. American added service to Phoenix and Charlotte, while also introducing mainline service to Dallas in February 2023 (supplementing its long-standing regional service to the city). Since 2012, the only known destinations to be cut from the airport's schedule that have not returned were five direct flights - Detroit (operated by Delta Connection) ended on November 25, 2012, Orlando (operated by Frontier) ended in 2022, Charlotte (operated by American Eagle) ended on October 6, 2022, Orange County (operated by Allegiant) ended in 2023, and Austin (operated by Allegiant) ended in August 2024. Frontier previously offered service to Las Vegas in 2018 for six months and again, beginning in September 2021 until early 2023.

=== Passenger ===
Airlines	Destinations	Refs
Allegiant Air	Fort Lauderdale, Las Vegas, Nashville, Orlando/Sanford, Phoenix/Mesa, St. Petersburg/Clearwater; Seasonal: Punta Gorda (FL)	
American Airlines	Dallas/Fort Worth	
American Eagle	Chicago–O'Hare, Dallas/Fort Worth, Phoenix–Sky Harbor	
Delta Air Lines	Atlanta, Minneapolis/St. Paul	
Delta Connection	Minneapolis/St. Paul	
Frontier Airlines	Denver	
United Airlines	Denver, Chicago–O'Hare	
United Express	Chicago–O'Hare, Denver	

Destinations map
Destinations from Sioux Falls Regional Airport
Red = Year-round destination
Green = Seasonal destination
Blue = Future destination

=== Cargo ===
Airlines	Destinations
Alpine Air Express	Aberdeen, Fargo, Mobridge, Rapid City, Watertown
FedEx Express	Memphis, Fargo
FedEx Feeder operated by CSA Air	Aberdeen, Pierre
FedEx Feeder operated by Empire Airlines	Rapid City
UPS Airlines	Louisville, Calgary

== Statistics ==
=== Top destinations ===
Top domestic destinations from FSD (June 2025 – May 2026)
Rank	Airport	Passengers	Airlines
1	(Illinois) Chicago–O'Hare	147,600	American, United
2	(Colorado) Denver	146,360	Frontier, United
3	(Minnesota) Minneapolis/St. Paul	126,320	Delta
4	(Texas) Dallas/Fort Worth	99,420	American
5	(Arizona) Phoenix/Mesa	59,010	Allegiant
6	(Georgia (U.S. state)) Atlanta	40,260	Delta
7	(Arizona) Phoenix–Sky Harbor	37,230	American
8	(Nevada) Las Vegas	24,810	Allegiant
9	(Florida) Orlando/Sanford	18,060	Allegiant
10	(Florida) St. Petersburg/Clearwater	17,520	Allegiant

=== Airline statistics ===
Largest airlines at FSD (June 2025 – May 2026)
Rank	Airline	Passengers	Market share
1	SkyWest Airlines	396,000	26.58%
2	Allegiant Air	296,000	19.85%
3	United Airlines	182,000	12.21%
4	Delta Air Lines	155,000	10.42%
5	American Airlines	147,000	9.84%
	Other	314,000	21.09%

== Ground transportation ==
Up until February 2025, Sioux Area Metro (SAM) offered their SAM on Demand service to the airport. Regular bus service to the airport began in February 2025. The SAM Bus Stop is located at the terminal.

== Incidents ==
On March 8, 1972, two people died after a Cessna arriving from Fairmont, Minnesota hit power lines on final approach.

On June 16, 1981, one person died and three people were injured after a single-engine Cessna experienced engine failure and crashed on takeoff.

On November 30, 1982, two people died after a Cessna P210 crashed short of the runway at night in fog.

On September 24, 1983, a modified ultralight aircraft crashed during an air show, killing its pilot and only occupant.

On November 6, 1983, a Convair 580 operating for Republic Airways struck a bird on landing, which penetrated the windshield and hit the captain in the face. The first officer completed the landing without further incident.

On December 20, 1983, Ozark Air Lines Flight 650 struck a snow plow on the runway while landing, killing the driver of the snow plow.

On December 9, 2011, a Cessna 421-C aircraft crashed shortly after takeoff less than a mile from the airport into an open field. All 4 passengers on board were killed when the aircraft burst into flames upon crashing.

On April 8, 2018, an Allegiant Airlines McDonnell Douglas MD-83 arriving from Las Vegas overran the runway due to snow and ice. No passengers were injured.

On December 25, 2018, a Beechcraft Baron, registered N6745V, crashed in southeast Sioux Falls while approaching runway 33. The pilot and one passenger died.

== See also ==
- List of airports in South Dakota
