= South Dakota Wing Civil Air Patrol =

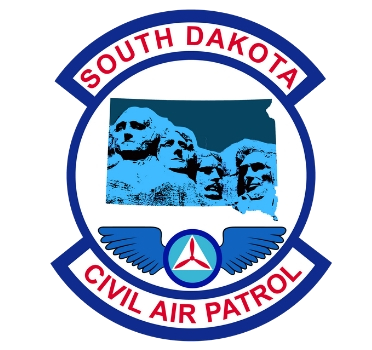
- South Dakota Wing of Civil Air Patrol

Associated branches
- United States Air Force

Command staff
- Commander: Col Kevin Pegelow
- Deputy Commander: Maj Tyler Gross
- Chief of Staff: Maj Denise Clement

Current statistics
- Cadets: 149
- Seniors: 375
- Total Membership: 524
- Website: sdwg.cap.gov
- Statistics as of October 2025

South Dakota Wing Civil Air Patrol (abbreviated as SDWG) is the highest echelon of CAP in the state of South Dakota. The wing headquarters is at the Rapid City Regional Airport in Rapid City, South Dakota. SDWG reports to CAP's North Central Region, which in turn reports to CAP National Headquarters at Maxwell AFB, Alabama. The wing consists of squadrons, the basic unit of CAP. At present, SDWG consists of three administrative squadrons and eight composite squadrons composed of cadets (youth ages 12–21) and senior members (age 18 and up). SDWG is currently commanded by Colonel Kevin Pegelow.

== Structure ==
Below wing level are squadrons. SDWG has three administrative squadrons and eight operational squadrons. The operational squadrons are at the local level of the CAP organization. They meet weekly to conduct CAP's three core missions and are on-call 24/7 to respond to requests for emergency assistance. In South Dakota Wing, all eight of the operational squadrons are composite squadrons in that they offer programs for both cadets and senior members.

Designation	Squadron Name	Location	Type
SD-000	Wing Holding Squadron	N/A	Administrative
SD-001	Headquarters Squadron	Rapid City	Administrative
SD-007	Lincoln County Composite Squadron	Tea	Operational
SD-020	Aberdeen Composite Squadron	Aberdeen	Operational
SD-031	Rushmore Composite Squadron	Ellsworth AFB (Rapid City)	Operational
SD-038	Pierre Composite Squadron	Pierre	Operational
SD-050	Sioux Falls Composite Squadron	Sioux Falls	Operational
SD-058	Big Sioux Composite Squadron	Brookings	Operational
SD-063	Lookout Mountain Composite Squadron	Spearfish	Operational
SD-068	Crazy Horse Composite Squadron	Custer	Operational
SD-999	Wing Legislative Squadron	Pierre	Administrative

== Missions ==
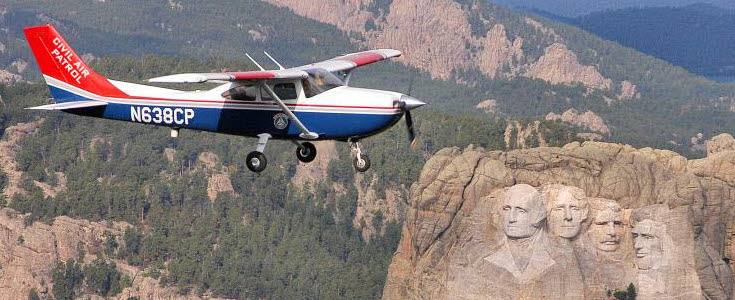
SDWG Cessna 182T flies past Mount Rushmore, South Dakota.

South Dakota Wing performs Civil Air Patrol's three congressionally mandated missions: Emergency Services, Aerospace Education, and Cadet Programs.

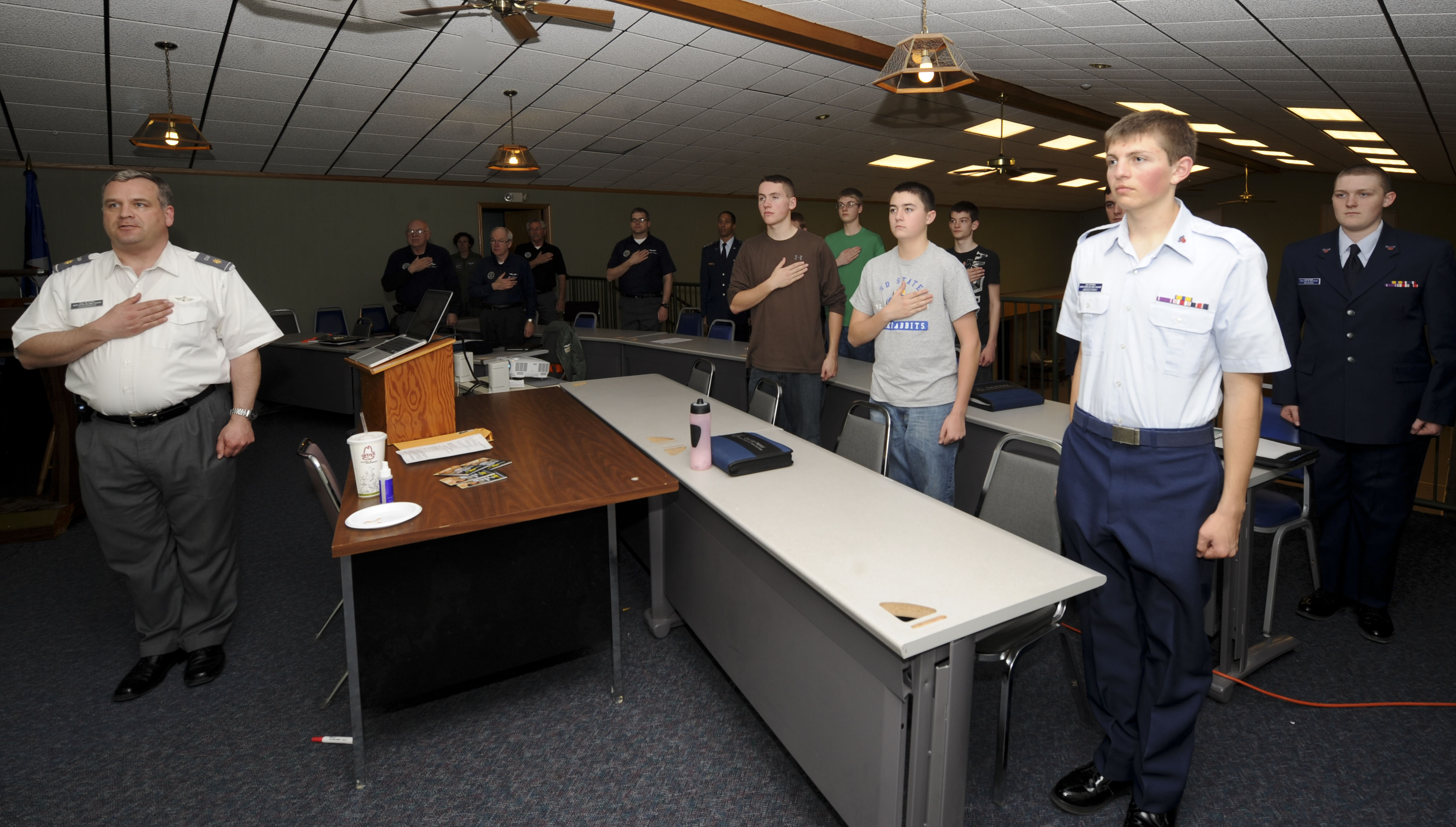
Members of the Civil Air Patrol Rushmore Composite Squadron stand and recite the Pledge of Allegiance during a monthly meeting at Ellsworth Air Force Base.

- Emergency Services – SDWG supports Civil Air Patrol's Emergency Services missions by operating six CAP aircraft and 19 multi-purpose vehicles. SDWG takes part in aerial and ground-based search and rescue, disaster relief operations, humanitarian assistance, support to the South Dakota Air National Guard through low-level route surveys and counter-aerial intruder training, and aerial survey assistance to the state Department of Game Fish and Parks and South Dakota State University in their wildlife management programs.
- Aerospace Education – The Aerospace Education program ensures all SDWG members have an appreciation for and knowledge of aerospace issues. It provides general aerospace knowledge and focuses on advances in aviation, aerospace technology and space exploration. SDWG's support for the AE mission also includes participation in local, state and national aviation events.
- Cadet Programs – While there are many youth oriented programs in America today, CAP's cadet program is unique in that it uses aviation as a cornerstone. SDWG offers the Cadet Program in all six of its squadrons across the state. The Cadet Program allows young people to progress at their own pace through a program including aerospace education, leadership training, physical fitness and character development. There is also an orientation flight program for the cadets.

== Cadet encampment ==
Each year South Dakota Wing and North Dakota Wing jointly hold an encampment, usually a week to ten days in length. These encampments allow cadets to experience a semi-military lifestyle with instruction in discipline, teamwork and leadership. Other activities involve instruction in drill and ceremonies, customs and courtesies, basic CAP knowledge and military traditions. The Joint Dakotas encampment alternates between Camp Grafton near Devils Lake or Grand Forks AFB, both in North Dakota and Camp Rapid or Ellsworth AFB, both in South Dakota.

== National Cadet Special Activities ==
National Cadet Special Activities are Cadet Programs conducted by Civil Air Patrol. NCSAs are designed to give cadets direct hands on experience with various aspects of the Civil Air Patrol program and provide meaningful insight into several aviation-related careers. There are about 30 different special activities that a cadet may attend. Each activity is approximately a week long, and all but two are offered during the summer. The variety of NCSAs offered by CAP gives cadets a diverse experience. Activities focus on career exploration, leadership development, search and rescue skills, aeronautical training, Air Force familiarization, government, and a variety of other topics.

== Scholarships ==
Civil Air Patrol members are also eligible for a wide variety of scholarships; academic scholarships, flight scholarships and school-specific scholarships.

== See also ==
- Awards and Decorations of the Civil Air Patrol
- Cadet Grades and Insignia of the Civil Air Patrol
- South Dakota State Guard
