= South Dakota State Guard =

- Active: 1917–1918; 1940–1942; 1944–1946; 1946–1948; 1954–1956
- Country: United States
- Allegiance: South Dakota
- Type: State defense force
- Role: Military reserve force
- Size: 100 companies (World War I); 4 companies (World War II)
- Part of: South Dakota Department of the Military
- Garrison/HQ: Pierre, South Dakota

Commanders
- Civilian leadership: Governor of South Dakota

The South Dakota State Guard is the currently inactive state defense force of South Dakota. The State Guard is recognized as a military force separate from the South Dakota National Guard. Unlike the National Guard, the State Guard is a purely state-level military force under the command of the Governor of South Dakota, and cannot be federalized or deployed outside the borders of the state. The South Dakota State Guard was active during World War I, World War II, and the Vietnam War and provided military protection to the state of South Dakota while the National Guard was in federal service.

== History ==
=== Predecessor units ===
Prior to the creation of the modern National Guard of the United States, the United States maintained a relatively small professional military and relied on state militias to augment the federal military in times of war. In 1901, the South Dakota Legislature designated the South Dakota State Guard as the organized militia of South Dakota, and required that the state maintain a certain minimum strength of cavalry, artillery, and infantry units. After the passage of the Militia Act of 1903, state militia units were reorganized into National Guard units and operated as a reserve component of the federal military.

=== World War I ===
The South Dakota National Guard was federalized in 1917. By 1917, Home Guard units were organizing in various counties and townships. In 1918, the South Dakota Legislature passed legislation allowing for the creation of a Home Guard. South Dakota's Home Guard, which was particularly active in protecting property from fire, reached a strength of 100 companies consisting of approximately 7,000 men by the end of the war. The State Guard was disbanded later in 1918.

=== World War II ===
Following the federalization of the South Dakota National Guard during World War II, South Dakota raised four companies of militia using the existing state legislation authorizing the National Guard, but did not request or receive federal recognition for these state units. The State Guard of World War II was organized into four companies, based in Aberdeen, Watertown, Pierre, and Sioux Falls. By 1944, the State Guard mustered a strength of 195 men.

South Dakota also created a state unit under the authority of the State Adjutant General in 1942 called the Fire Protection Force (FPF), consisting of two line companies and one headquarters company, in the Black Hills region to control fires in the region. The federal government was responsible for most of the region and supplied the FPF with its equipment. The State Guard was disbanded in 1948.

=== Korean War ===
The South Dakota State Guard was reactivated during the Korean War from the years 1954 to 1956.

== Legal status ==
The authority of each state to maintain a state defense force is recognized by the federal government under Title 32, Section 109 of the United States Code. Under this legislation, twenty-three other states and the territory of Puerto Rico currently maintain state defense forces. The South Dakota State Guard Act grants the Governor of South Dakota the authority to organize the South Dakota State Guard at his or her discretion, making reactivation possible either through an act of legislature or by executive order.

== See also ==
- Naval militia
- South Dakota Wing Civil Air Patrol
- United States Coast Guard Auxiliary
