= Lockheed Martin Information Technology =

- Type: Subsidiary
- Industry: IT Consulting
- Defunct: 16 August 2016
- Area served: Worldwide
- Parent: Lockheed Martin
- Website: www.lockheedmartin.com/isgs/

Lockheed Martin Information Technology (also known as Lockheed Martin Information & Technology Services and Lockheed Martin Technology Services) is a subsidiary of American company Lockheed Martin that consists of dozens of smaller companies and units that have been acquired and integrated. It also administers a number of US government contracts and operates in information technology, integration and management, application development, aircraft maintenance and modification services, management and logistics services for government and military systems, mission and analysis services, engineering and information services for NASA, and support of nuclear weapons and naval nuclear reactors. The US government accounts for more than 90% of sales.

== Business components, subdivisions, and affiliations ==
- Knolls Atomic Power Laboratory
- Sandia National Laboratories
- OAO (acquired in 2001)
- ACS gave its IT assets to LMIT and became Lockheed Martin's benefits provider in 2003.
- The Sytex Group (acquired in 2005)
- Aspen Systems Corporation (acquired in January 2006)

== Contracts ==
- Contract to clean up the Hanford Site in Richland, Washington.
- Interrogator recruitment at Fort Belvoir and Fort Huachuca.
- In 1999 the British government awarded Lockheed Martin U.K. a contract controlling British census info.
- In 2002, a 7-year contract for the Centers for Medicare and Medicaid Services (CMS) Consolidated Information Technology Infrastructure Contract (CITIC) program.
- In 2003 a 7-year, $465,000,000 contract to provide services for the CDC.
- In 2004 LMIT conducted a test census in Canada and has been awarded the contract to administer the upcoming Canada 2006 Census.
- In 2004 LMIT was part of a $600,000,000 contract with the Air Force Pentagon Communications Agency.
- As of 2004, a 7-year, $525,000,000 contract with the United States Social Security Administration called the Agency Wide Support Services Contract.
- In 2004, a $700,000,000 contract to provide services for the EPA.
- In 2005, a $800,000,000 contract to provide services for HUD was split with EDS after a protracted battle.
- In 2005, a 10-year contract with the FAA for operating Automated Flight Service Stations (AFSS).
- In 2006, a 6-year $305,000,000 contract for the FBI Sentinel program.

== Products ==
- E-STARS workflow management software.
- CIO-SP2 contract vehicle.

== Interrogation controversy ==
As part of the ACS and Sytex acquisitions, Lockheed Martin became a contractor for military interrogation. Some of the Sytex interrogators have been linked to Guantanamo Bay, Bagram torture and prisoner abuse and the Abu Ghraib torture and prisoner abuse scandals. In 2004, the GSA was reported to have begun investigating Lockheed's interrogation contracts.
