= Marking =

Marking may refer to:

== Symbols ==
Marking may refer to human-made symbols and annotations in several contexts:

=== On vehicles ===
- Aircraft marking
- Emergency vehicle equipment markings
  - Battenburg markings, emergency vehicle patterns
- Vehicle markings of the United States military
- Police vehicle markings (US/Canada)
- Sail Class Markings, figures placed on the sail of sailing boats to mark the boat type
- Semi-trailer truck marking lights

=== On other manufactured goods ===
- Card marking, altering playing cards in secret for use in magic tricks or cheating
- Conductor marking lights, power line markers
- Direct part marking, a process to mark parts with product information
- Photographic film markings
- Road surface marking, such as lines or words, or the stripes of a zebra crossing on a road surface
- UID-marking, permanent marking used by the US Department of Defense

=== Other symbols ===
- Grading (education), evaluation of the performance of a student
- Lamb marking, a process of earmarking, castration and tail-docking of the lambs of domestic sheep
- Postal marking, annotation applied to a letter by a postal service
- Road surface marking, such as lines or words, or the stripes of a zebra crossing on a road surface
- Territorial marking, a behavior used by animals to identify their territory
- Trail blazing, marks in outdoor areas that indicate the direction of a trail
- The process of assigning priorities to objects of interest, for the purposes of targeting, surveillance or analysis
- Timber marking, selecting the trees to be cut in a forest stand by marking them with a marking axe

== Linguistics ==
- Marker (linguistics), a free or bound morpheme that indicates the grammatical function of the marked word, phrase, or sentence
- Markedness, the state of standing out as unusual or divergent in comparison to a more common or regular form

== People ==
- Havana Marking, British producer and director of documentary films

== Sports ==
- Marking (association football), assigning a defender to a certain offensive player:
  - Man-to-man marking
  - Zonal marking
- Mark (Australian football), the action of catching an airborne kicked ball in Australian rules football

== Other uses ==
- Animal markings, such as the spots of a leopard or horse markings
- Lamb marking, a process of earmarking, castration and tail-docking of the lambs of domestic sheep
- Jehovah's Witnesses "marking", withdrawing of close association from a congregant according to Thessalonians 3:14
- Sole markings, a type of sedimentary structure
- Trace evidence, in forensic science
- Vägmärken (Markings), a book by Dag Hammarskjold

== See also ==
- Marking gauge
- Marking knife
- Marking out
- Marking scheme
- Marking Time (disambiguation)
- Mark (disambiguation)
