= Logojet =

Airliner with an advertising paint scheme

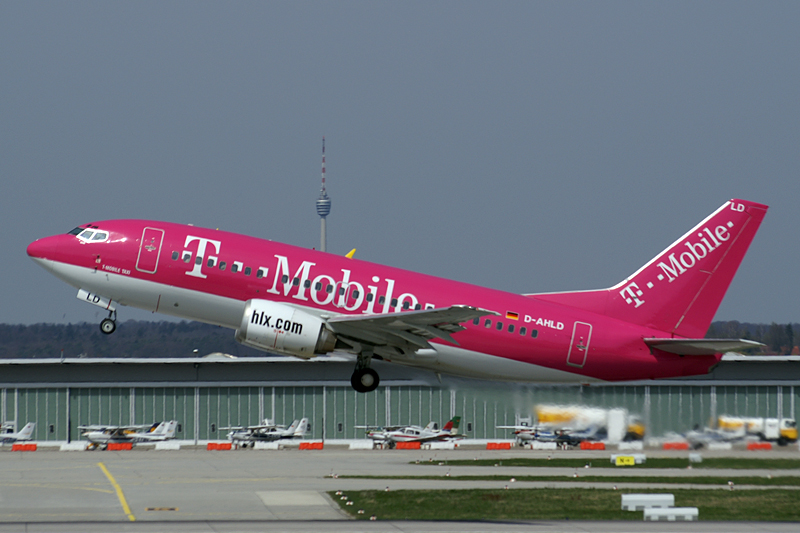
A Hapag-Lloyd Express Boeing 737-500 logojet advertising T-Mobile

A Thai AirAsia Airbus A320-216 logojet advertising Amazing Thailand

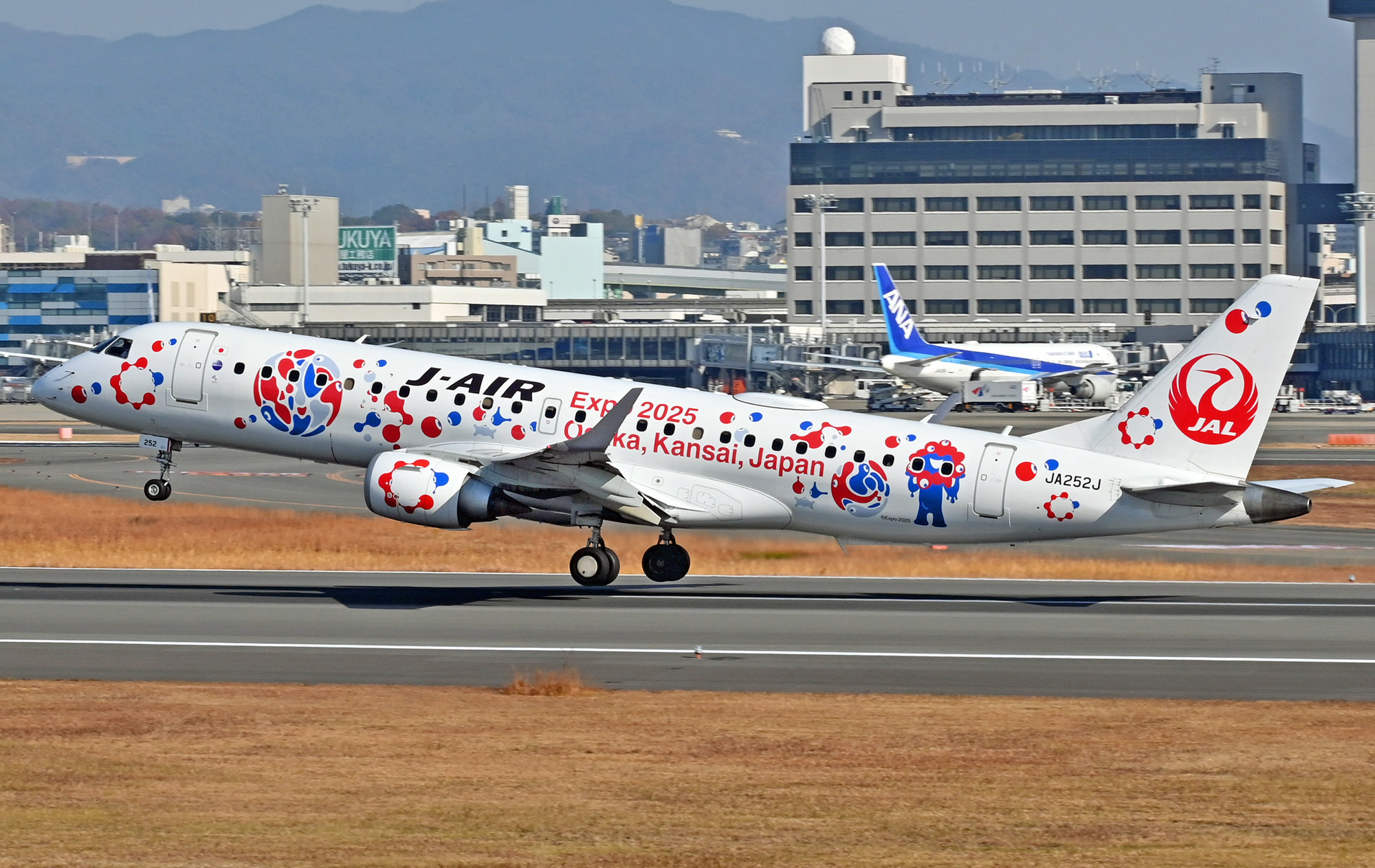
A Japan Airlines Embraer 190STD logojet advertising Expo 2025

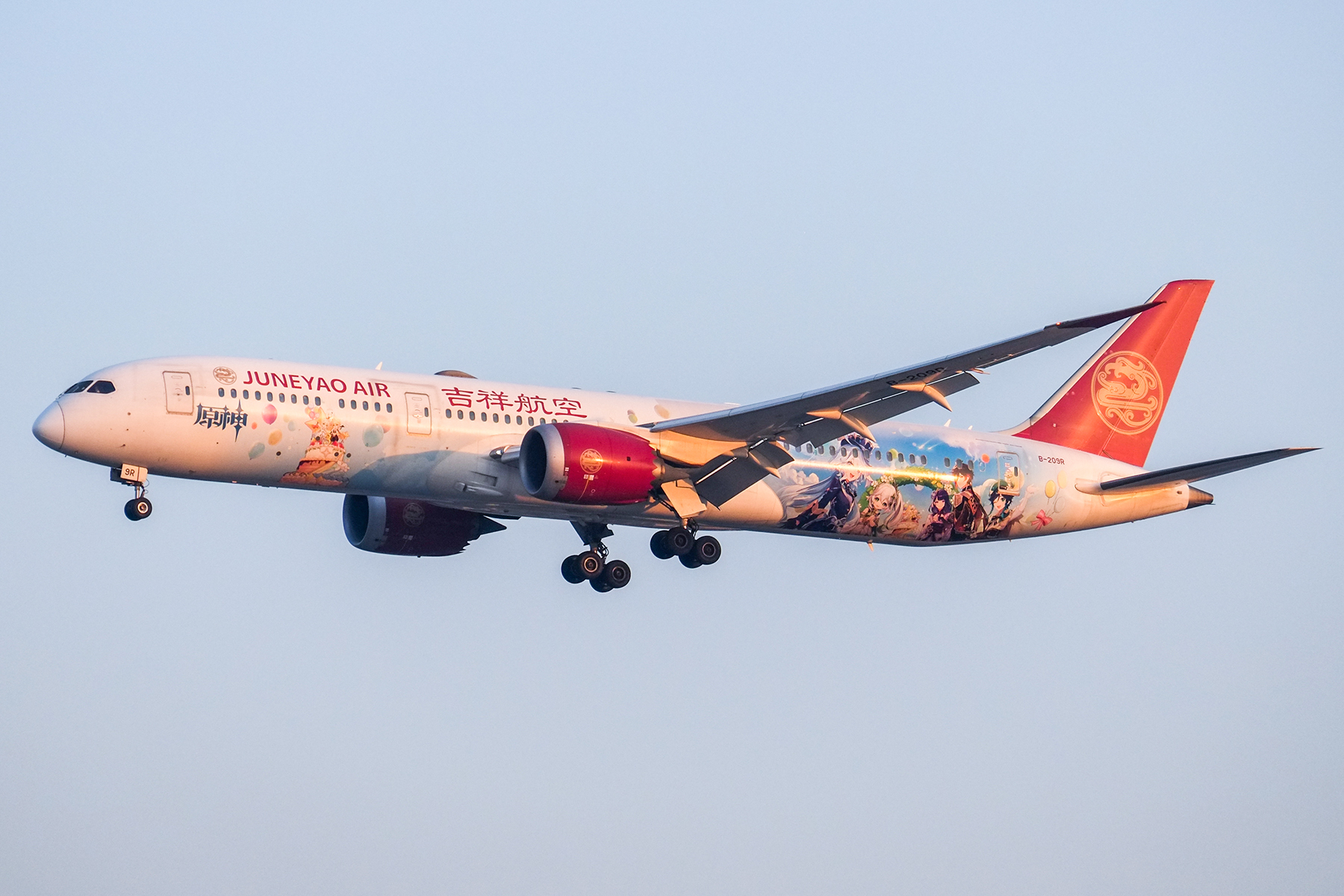
A Juneyao Air Boeing 787-9 logojet advertising Genshin Impact

Examples of logojets

A logojet is an airliner with a custom aircraft livery for the purpose of advertising a product.

When accommodating advertisements, the aircraft's normal livery often disappears completely from the fuselage, leaving only the airline's logo painted, for example, on the engine's cowling or the winglets. Logojets can also advertise sporting and cultural events, where in such cases, the logo of the event is usually added to the fuselage without replacing the original livery. Logojets used for advertising companies remain uncommon due to the time and cost of repainting an entire airliner.

== Examples ==
=== All Nippon Airways ===
All Nippon Airways are well-known for their Pokemon logojets.

=== Emirates ===
Emirates are also well-known for their special logojets, sometimes in partnership with sports teams or events (as with Arsenal FC, AC Milan, Real Madrid, the Wimbledon tennis tournament, and historically the 2014 FIFA World Cup).

=== Southwest Airlines ===
Southwest Airlines are known for their special Shamu SeaWorld Boeing 737.

=== Sports sponsorship ===
An example of a sports logojet is Lufthansa airliners that sported a football motif on their noses prior to the 2006 FIFA World Cup in Germany.
