= Aircraft livery =

Decorative markings on aircraft

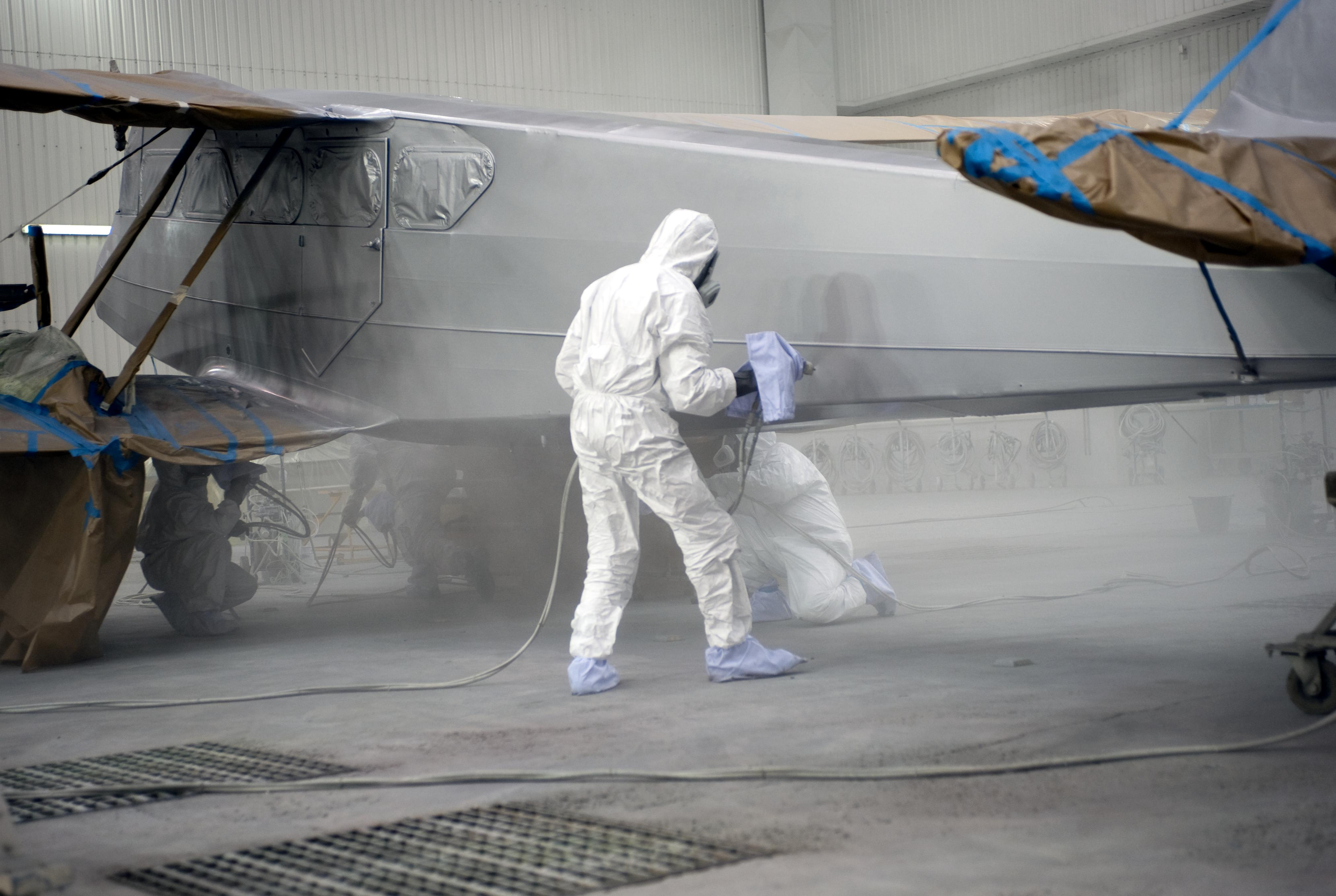
Spray-painting a historic de Havilland Dragon Rapide in the colors of Iberia (2010)

An aircraft livery is a set of comprehensive insignia comprising color, graphic, and typographical identifiers which operators (airlines, governments, air forces and occasionally private and corporate owners) apply to their aircraft.

As aircraft liveries evolved in the years after the Second World War, they became a leading subset of the emerging disciplines of corporate identity and branding and among the most prominent examples of fashion. They have provided an arena for the work of distinguished designers and eminent lay people like Raymond Loewy, Alexander Girard, Jacqueline Kennedy Onassis and President Donald Trump. The term is an adaptation of the word livery: the uniform-style clothing worn by servants of wealthy families and government representatives until the early/mid-20th century. With the advent of stagecoaches, railway trains, and steamships, the term livery spread to their decoration. Since the 1950s, elements of airline liveries permeated ground vehicles, advertising, proprietary airport furniture, airline promotional materials and aircrew uniforms in an increasingly integrated manner, spreading to airline websites in the 1990s.

Since the 1950s and 1960s, aircraft liveries have usually been uniform livery across an entire fleet. One-off custom-designs might be applied from time to time to individual fleet members to highlight set occasions.

== Application ==
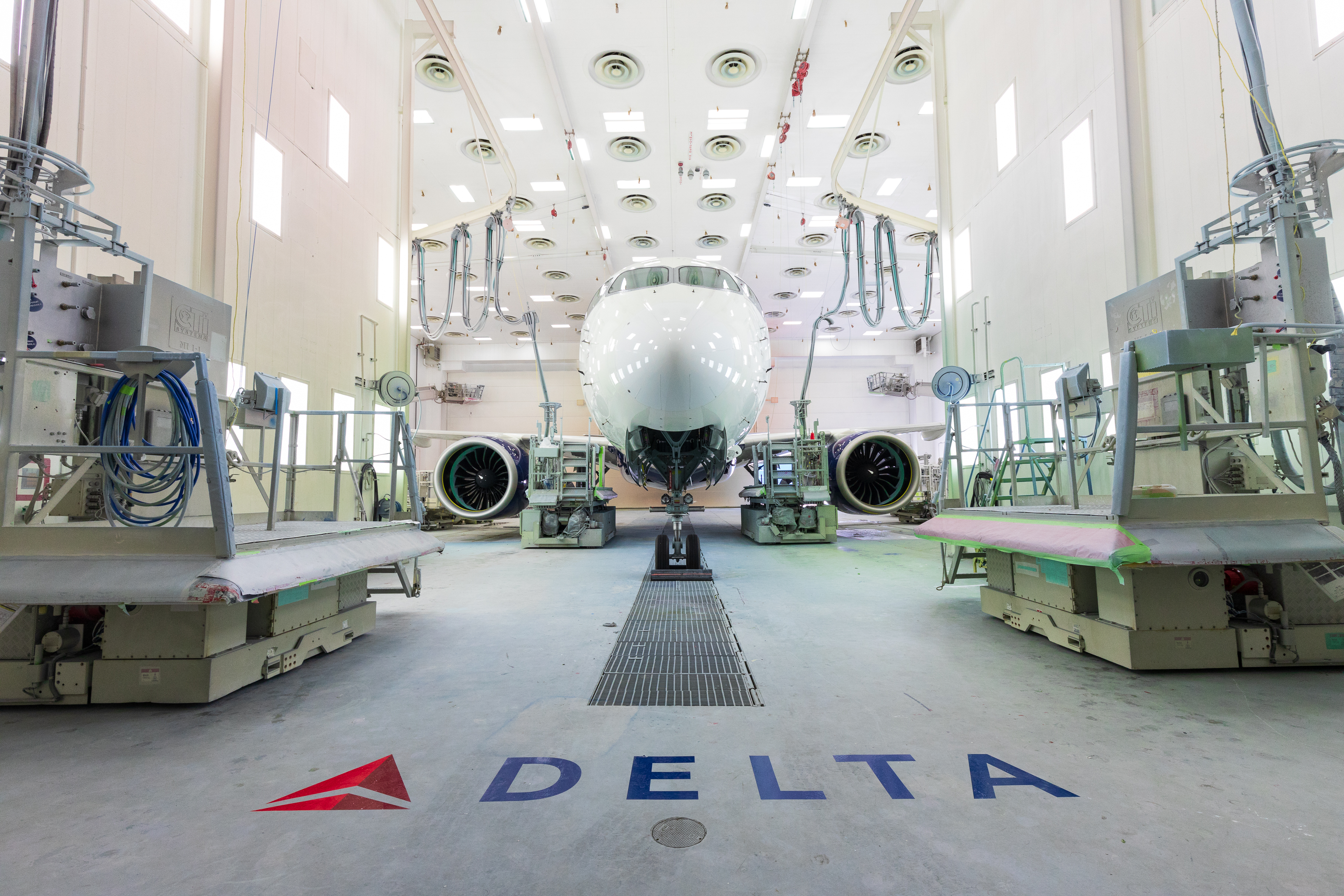
An Airbus A220 in Delta Air Lines paint shop (2018)

Painting in multiple layers has evolved into the application of a basecoat-clearcoat system. The new method improves gloss, color retention, and drying speed. It can also double the life of the coating and weigh possibly 30% less than multiple layers. Paint can weigh up to 1,000 lb (450 kg) per aircraft. Decals and/or stickers are used for geometrically challenging elements such as titles and logos.

To paint an A380, 24 painters were needed over two weeks to apply 2,300 L (610 US gal) of paint in five coats for British Airways, to cover 3,500 m^{2} (38,000 sq ft) with 650 kg (1,430 lb). Emirates stripped and repainted one in 15 days with 34 people including seven days for painting, covering 3,076 m^{2} (33,110 sq ft) with 1,100 kg (2,400 lb) in seven coats.

== Airline liveries ==
=== Elements ===
Airline liveries involve set individual elements.

The airline's name is usually set in a specific style. This is closely defined by typographical designers as a logotype. The specification covers: typeface (either a commercially available typeface, or else a specially designed and copyrighted custom typeface); type size; type case (capitals or "uppercase," upper and lowercase, lowercase only); cut (Romans or upright letters, italics or slanted letters, regular/condensed/expanded type); weight (bold, medium, light); proportion (defined as units of tight or loose setting, plus amount and degree of type kerning). Size varies according to fleet member; the larger the aircraft, the larger the titling. Since type is designed to be customarily read from a flat surface, airline livery type is often modified to fit curved aircraft surfaces. The specifications result in a logotype: a cliche of type whose characteristics remain unchanged.

The airline's monogram or emblem is defined in terms of geometry by graphic designers. The resulting specification is called a logo. Logos are also modified to fit curved surfaces and appear identical from diverse viewing angles.

The colour or colours are specified in terms of colour matching and standardisation systems like Pantone or Federal Standard 595. The resulting specification is called a colourway.

Individual aircraft types most often have individually designed liveries which appear to be identical, but are not quite the same as those applied to other aircraft types operated by the same airline. Uniform liveries became generally adopted by the 1950s and '60s. Before then, individual airlines, notably Aeroflot and some US carriers like Delta Air Lines, used custom liveries designed for each individual aircraft type they operated. Aeroflot abandoned the practice as late as 1974, adopting a uniform livery across its fleet.

=== Standard liveries ===
==== Bare metal ====
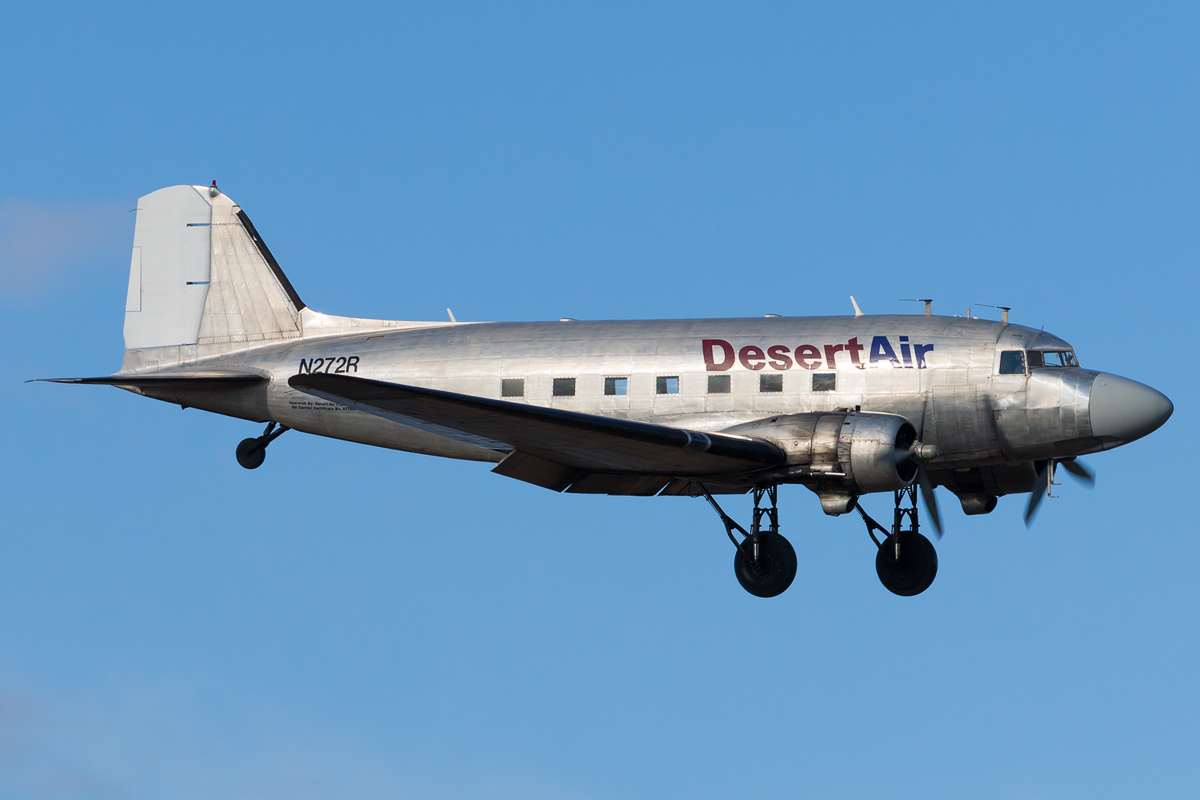
A Desert Air Douglas DC-3 in a bare metal (2015)

Until after the Second World War, the "default solution" for aircraft livery design was to leave the aircraft exterior unpainted and decorated only with the airline's title, plus possibly an emblem or monogram. When the world's first all-metal airliners, such as the Boeing 247, Douglas DC-2, and Douglas DC-3, entered service in the 1930s, the sleekness of their shiny exteriors provided an imaginative canvas for livery design. At the time, paint was expensive, fairly heavy, had relatively poor adherence to metal, and was prone to early bleaching, mechanical, and chemical damage; leaving the aircraft skin largely unpainted was logical and economical.

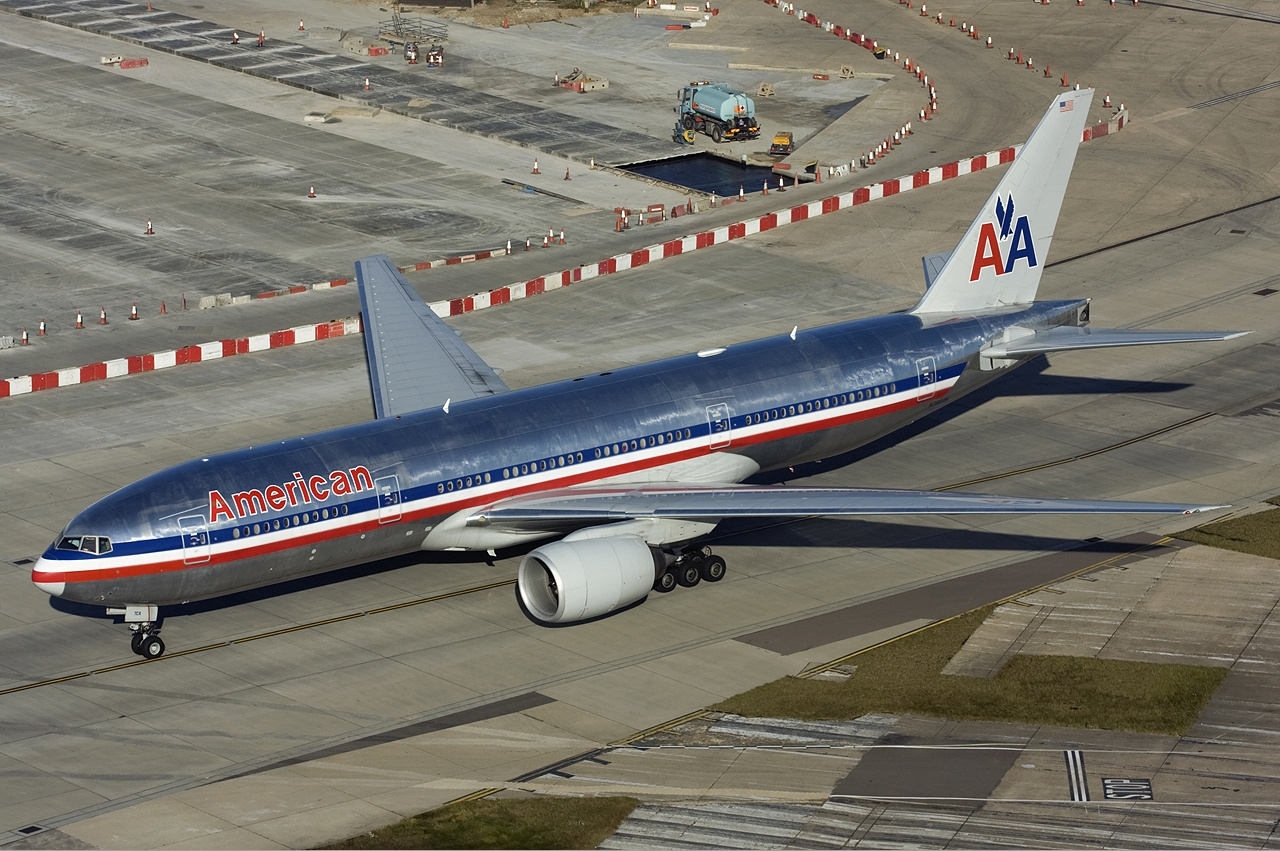
American Airlines was a major operator adopting the bare metal scheme as standard livery for its whole fleet (1968–2013) before replacing it by a conventionally-painted color.

As corrosion and paint research advanced and airliner lives lengthened, airframers began applying advanced primers and treatments to airliners during manufacture. Many airframers insisted on overall corrosion protection remaining in place throughout an airliner's service life, or at least throughout its diverse guarantee periods. This made bare metal liveries problematic; they began giving way to painted exteriors by the mid-1960s. To ensure longevity, bare metal liveries involved intensive polishing and waxing during manufacture and in service. Nevertheless, the bare metal era survived into the 21st century, although composite-material airliners like the Boeing 787 Dreamliner and all Airbus jets cannot achieve the bare metal look without paint due to their material, which does not have metallic luster.

The most notable proponent of the bare metal look, American Airlines, adopted a painted livery in 2013. Other passenger airlines, including Aeroflot, Aeromexico, Air Canada, CP Air, Cathay Pacific, Condor Flugdienst, JAT Yugoslav Airlines, Lufthansa, Northwest Airlines, SAS Scandinavian Airlines System, TAROM, US Airways, and Western Airlines also employed unadorned bare metal in whole or part of their liveries for set periods or as an experiment. Cargo carriers like Cargolux, Flying Tiger Line, JAL Japan Airlines Cargo, Korean Air Cargo, and Seaboard World Airlines often claimed that their bare metal liveries save weight. Counterclaims stated that extra maintenance costs cancel this benefit.

==== Cheatline ====
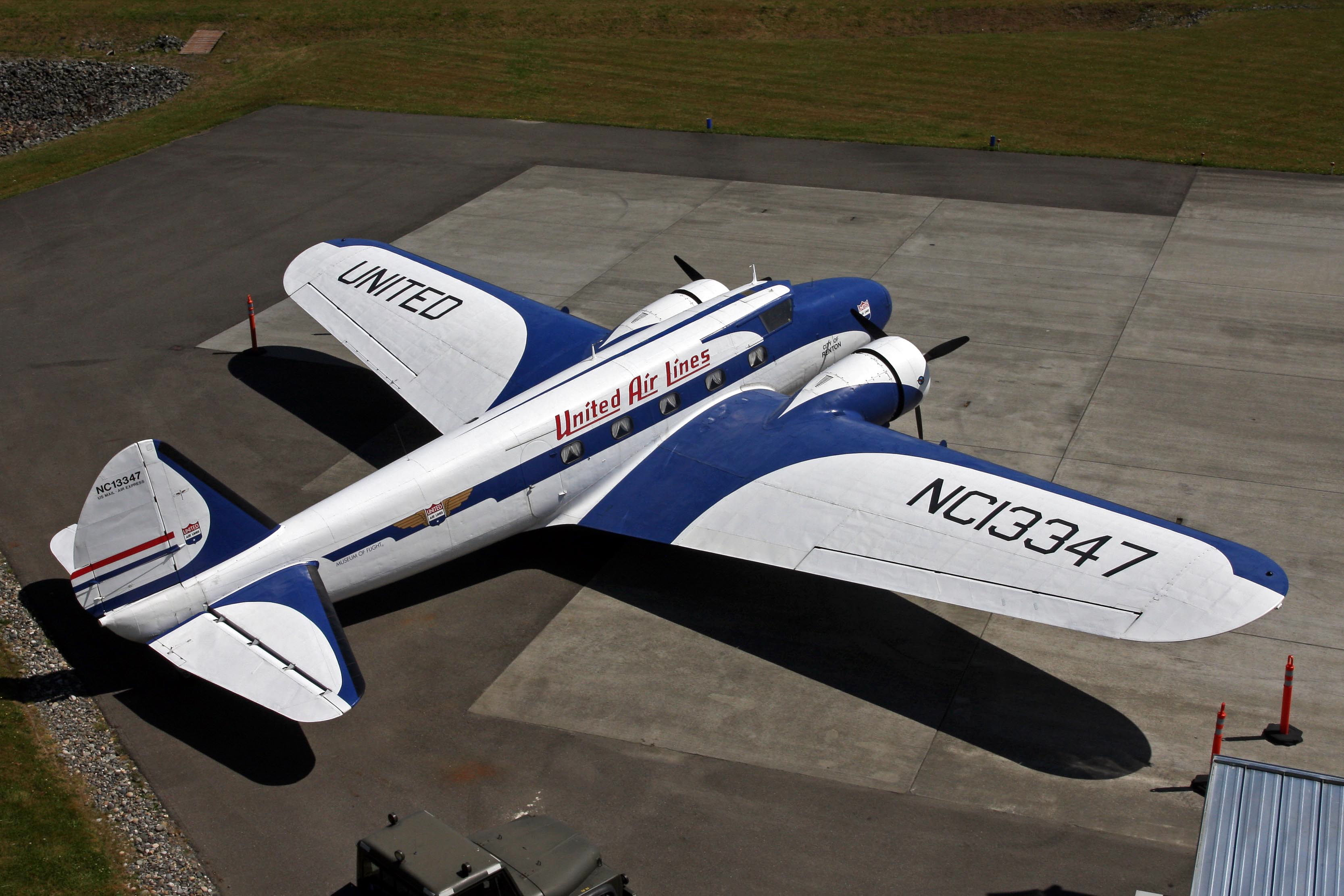
A Boeing 247 of United Air Lines with a cheatline (preserved aircraft, 2012)

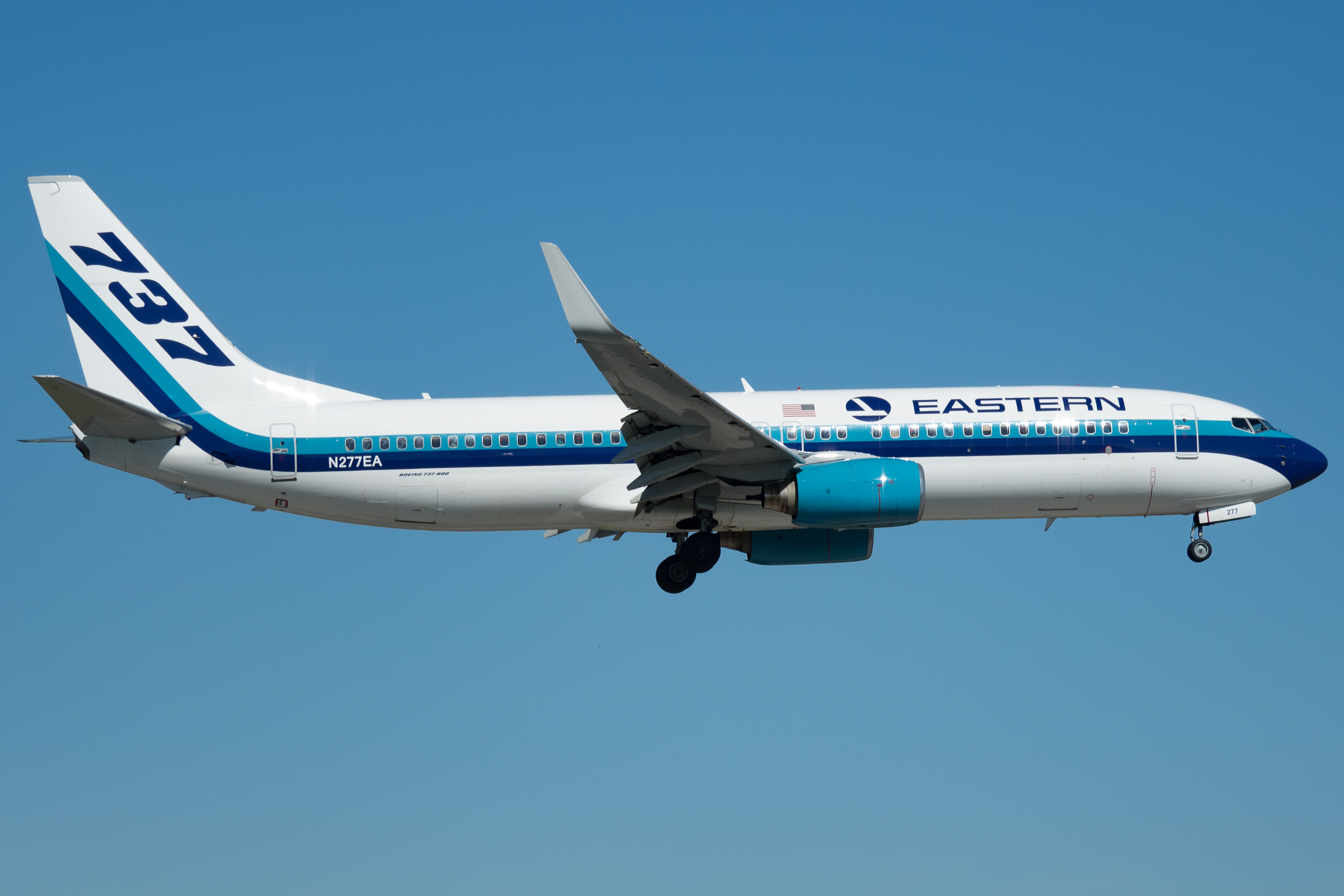
A Boeing 737NG of Eastern Air Lines (2015) with a hockey stick cheatline (preserved aircraft, 2015)

Among the earliest recognisable elements of aircraft liveries was the cheatline. A cheatline is a decorative horizontal stripe applied to the sides of an aircraft fuselage. The etymology of the term stems from "cheating the eye" because the first cheatlines aimed to streamline aircraft visually by reducing the staccato impact of their cabin windows. US carriers like the predecessors of United Air Lines and TWA (then Transcontinental and Western Airlines) adopted cheatlines as early as the 1920s.

Cheatlines may be in single ("rules") or multiple ("tramlines") bands, and in one or more colours. Cheatlines migrated from the window line to below or occasionally above it. They also melded other decorative elements like stylised lightning bolts, feathers, moustaches, national flags and colours, and elements of the airline's title and emblem.

Cheatlines declined in popularity from the 1970s onward. Today, they often appear in liveries designed to evoke a retro aesthetic or convey a sense of tradition (heritage/retro liveries). However, some major airlines continue to employ cheatlines in their standard liveries, such as Air China and Singapore Airlines, where they serve as enduring elements of corporate branding rather than retro stylisation.

In 2023, Saudia introduced its current brand identity, which included reverting to a cheatline scheme similar to those worn by its aircraft between the 1970s and early 2000s. One noticeable difference, however, is that the cheatline itself was moved to beneath the windows, instead of being applied across them.

Contemporary standard liveries featuring cheatlines

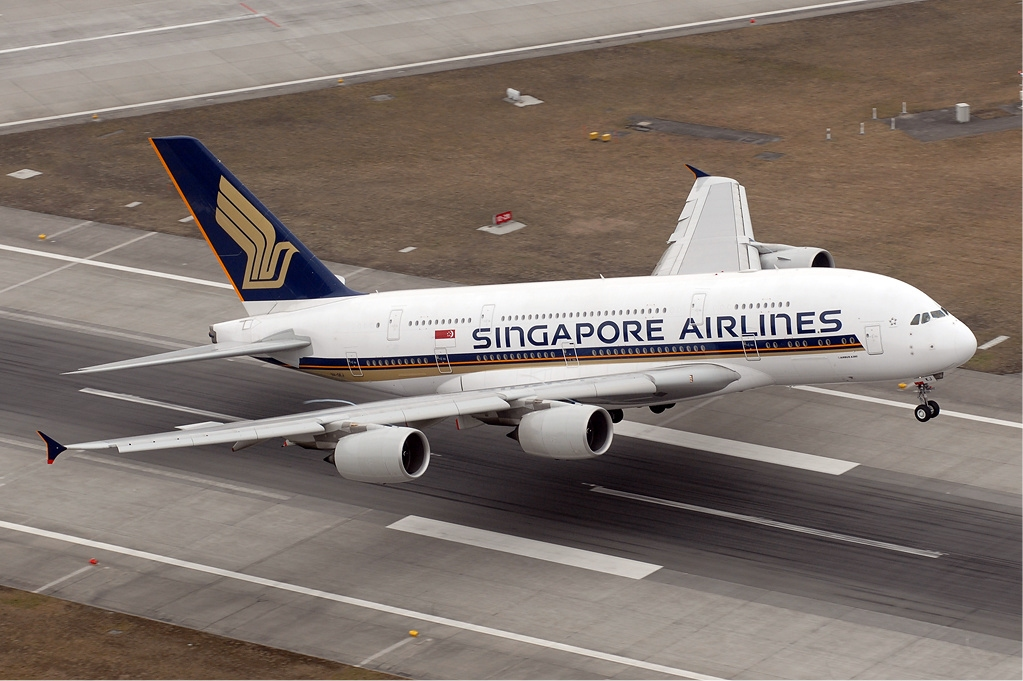
A Singapore Airlines Airbus A380 in its standard livery (2011)

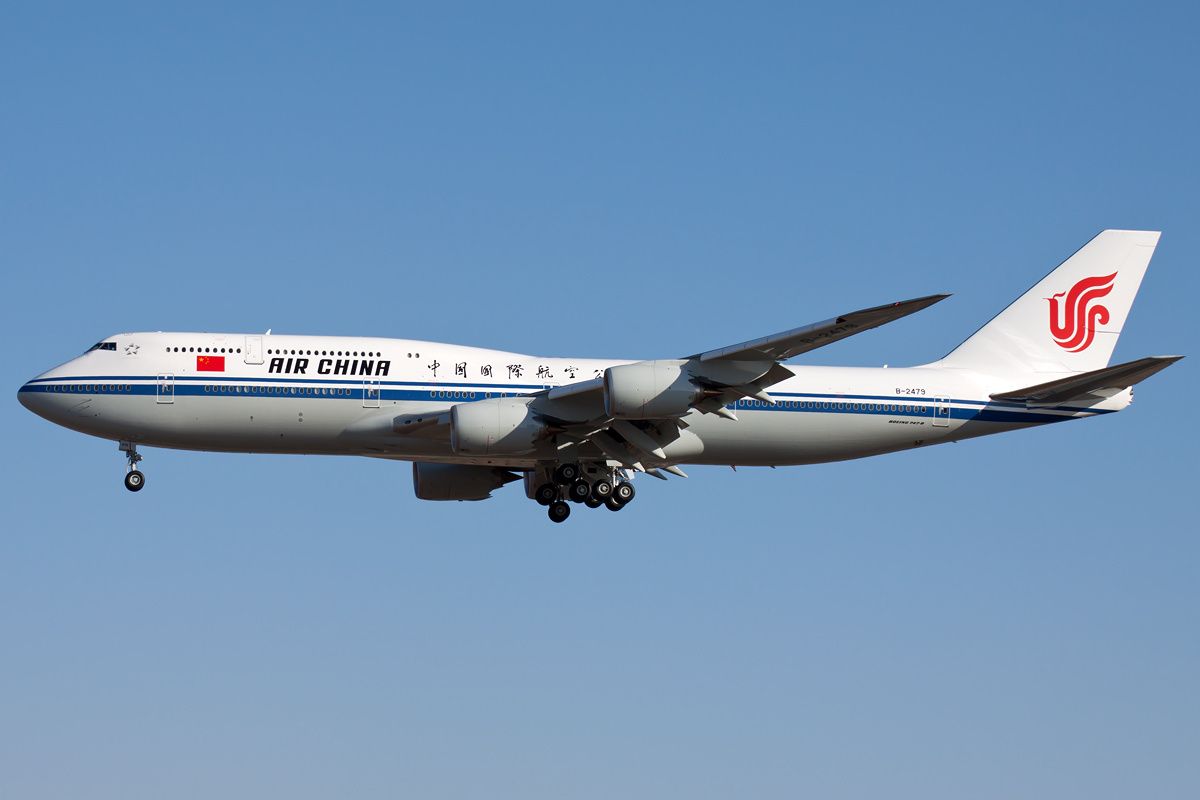
An Air China Boeing 747-8 in its standard livery (2014)

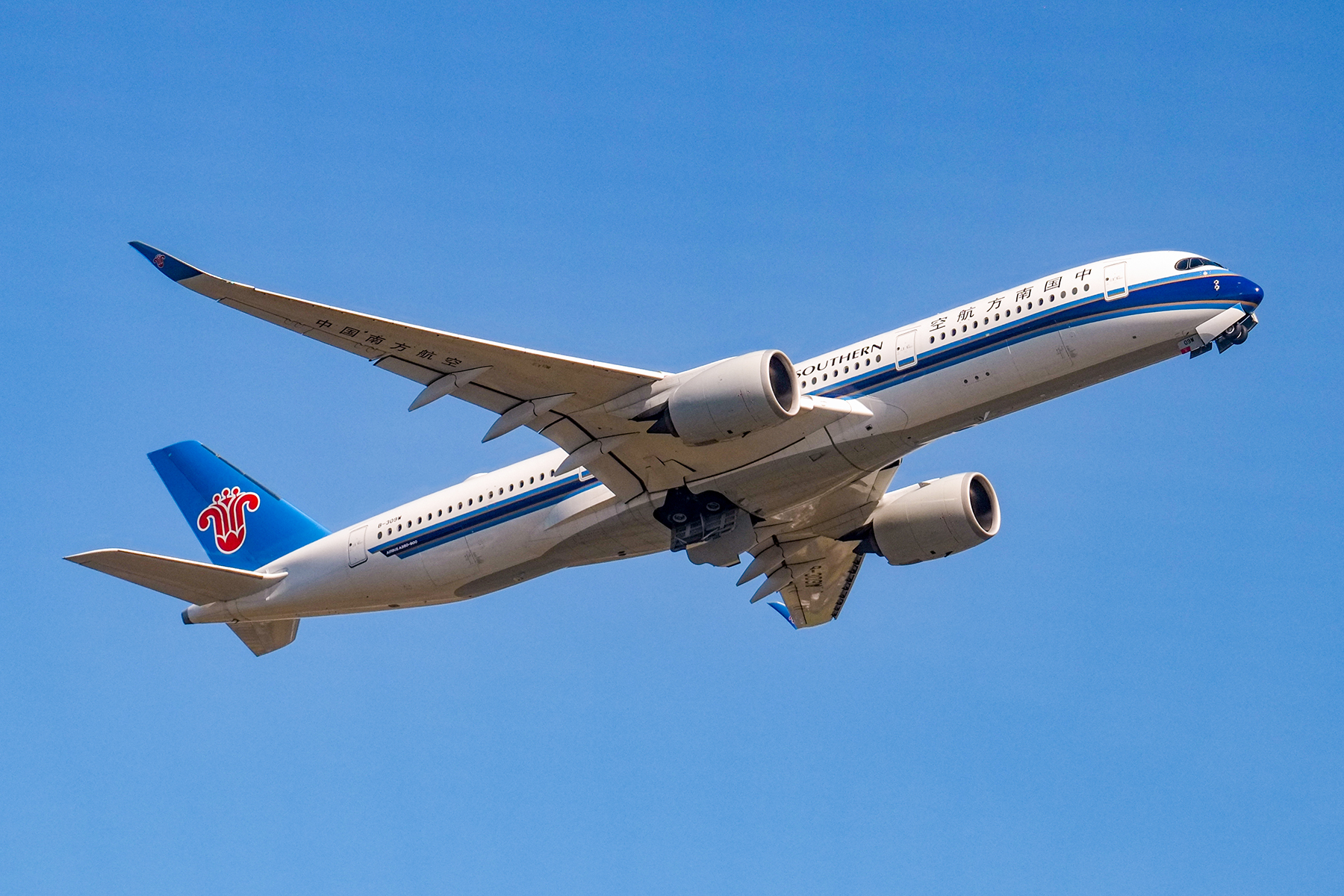
A China Southern Airbus A350 in its standard livery (2023)

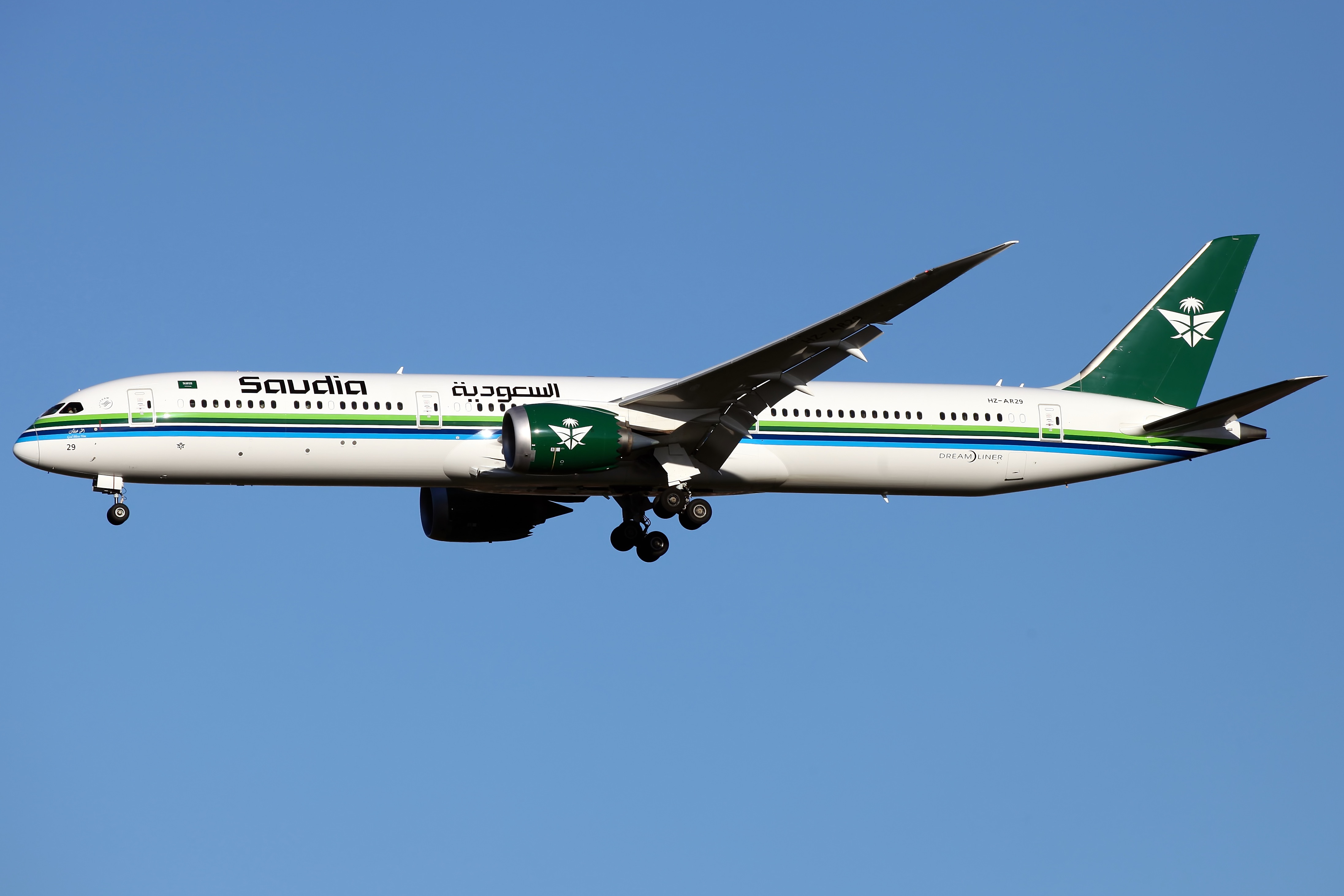
A Saudia Boeing 787 in its standard livery (2025)

==== Hockey stick ====
In aircraft livery design, a "hockey stick" means a continuation of the cheatline which is rotated through an angle so as to sweep upwards over the tail fin. Among the first hockey stick liveries were the Eastern Airlines' 1964 jet livery and Alitalia's 1970 livery. Hockey stick aircraft liveries remained in fashion until the late 1970s/early '80s with Cathay Pacific still having them as late as 1994.

==== All-over color ====
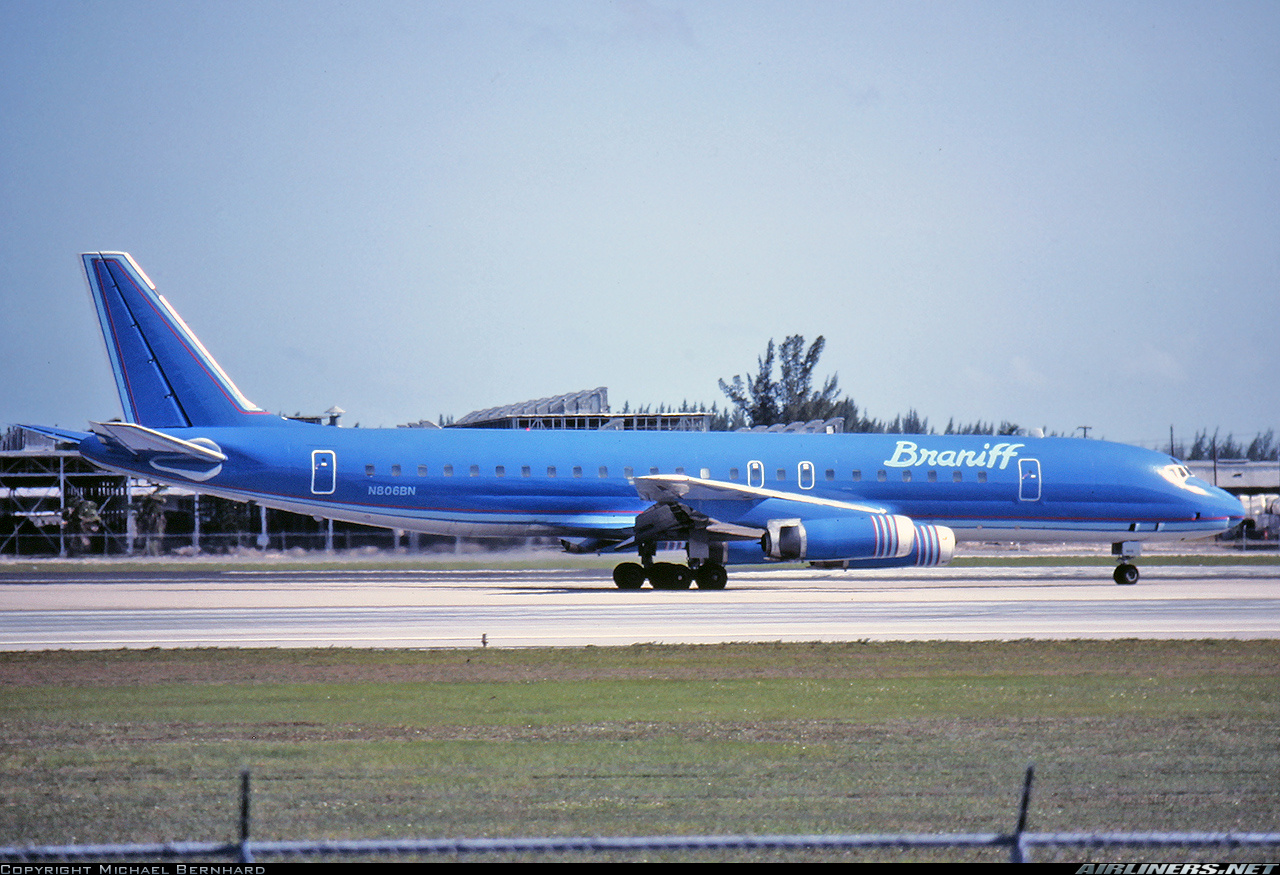
Braniff International DC-8 in all-over blue (1980)

In 1965, Braniff International Airways hired Alexander Girard to revamp their corporate identity. The eventual design involved painting the entire aircraft fuselage in one of several single bold colourways. The airline title was logotyped as "Braniff International" in custom designed italic capitals, with the initials pasted across airliner tail fins. The livery was part of a comprehensive corporate identity revamp also involving dedicated airport lounges and including a short-lived "space helmet" headgear for cabin staff.

In 1969, Court Line Aviation hired Peter Murdoch to revamp its corporate identity. The resulting design included decorating each fleet member in one of five different colourways within a hockeystick scheme. The airline name was logotyped as "court" in custom designed lowercase italics, and could easily be changed to 'liat' when individual aircraft transferred to Court Line's Caribbean subsidiary LIAT Leeward Islands Air Transport.

Another all-over colour livery was adopted by airline group British Air Services in late 1970. Group members Northeast Airlines and Cambrian Airlines had their aircraft painted white/grey/yellow and white/grey/orange. Related pink and green liveries were designed for group members Scottish and Channel Islands Airways, but never saw service use.

==== Eurowhite ====
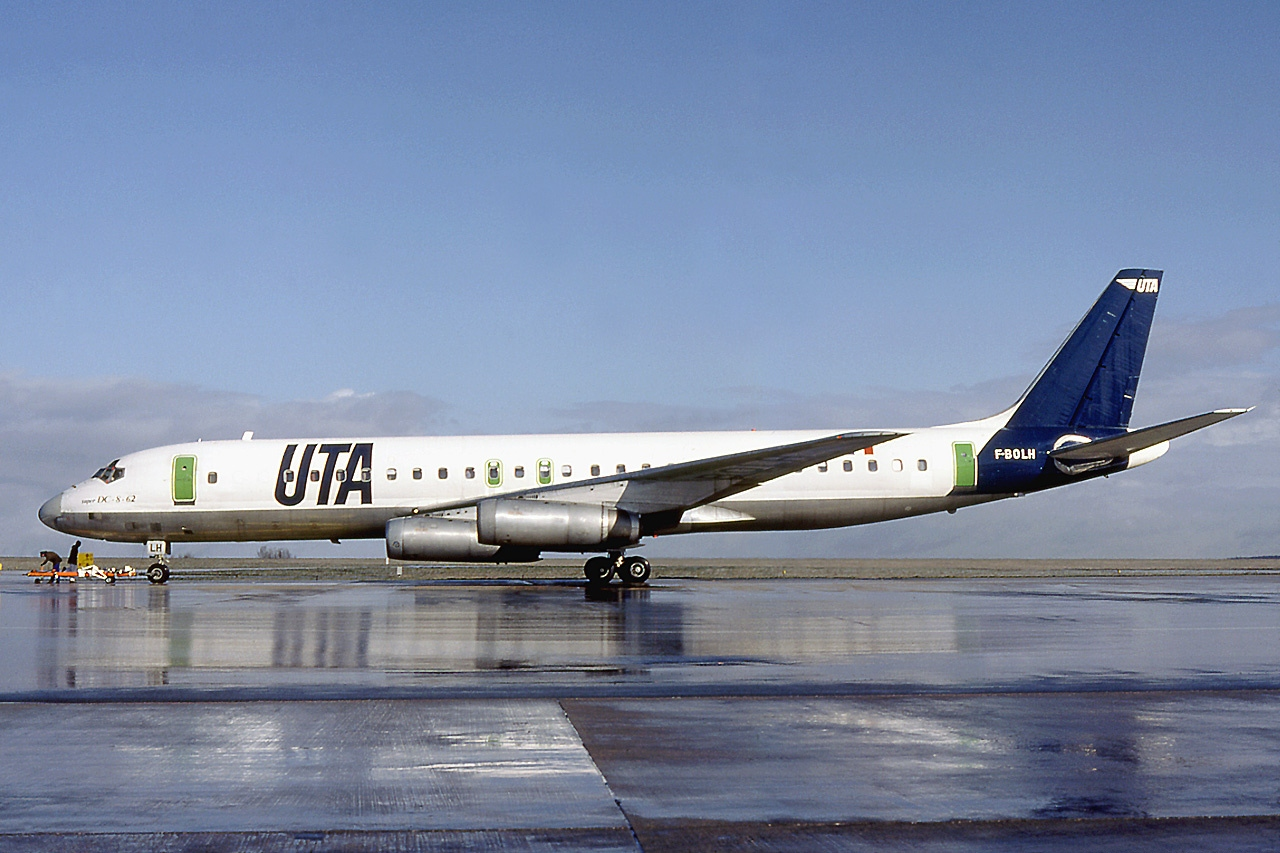
A UTA DC-8 in Eurowhite, 1983.

From the 1970s, the overall colour idea began to spread worldwide, largely in the form of "Eurowhite" liveries in which white was the dominant colour. A side benefit of the overall white look was that it helped airline asset management. It did so by facilitating the hiring-out (chartering in 1960s parlance or leasing from the 1970s) of individual fleet members during seasonal traffic troughs or economic downturns. Overall white aircraft could readily accept major elements of lessee liveries, and could equally rapidly revert to lessor liveries on return.

Notable early Eurowhite liveries included UTA Union de Transports Aériens's early 1970s livery and Air France's 1976 livery. Pan Am's 1983 “Billboard” livery was among the first Eurowhite schemes outside Europe. Except for a very brief Air France Pepsi logojet example, all Concorde liveries were predominantly Eurowhite-based, as this reduced heat absorption.

==== Jelly bean ====
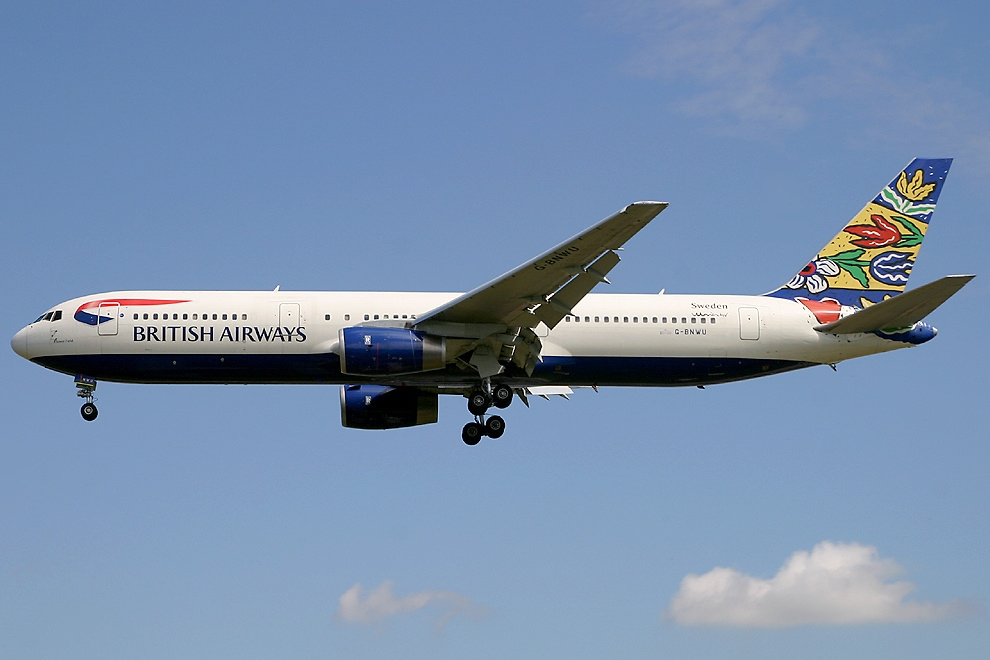
Jelly bean British Airways ethnic liveries 767 (2003)

The Braniff 1967 livery (see All-Over Color above) was also often dubbed "Jellybean." Jellybean liveries involve multiple alternative colourways in which entire aircraft or parts of them are decorated. A Jellybean variant involved decorating tail fins in different designs, as exemplified by Air India Express, displaying different Indian culture and heritage on its tail, Alaska Airline's 1972 brand refresh livery, Frontier Airlines with the images of different animals and birds on its tail, JetBlue Airways, Mexicana, Pakistan International Airlines' "ethnic tails," and PLUNA. British Airways’ 1997 ethnic liveries were celebrated Jellybean examples.

==== Billboard ====
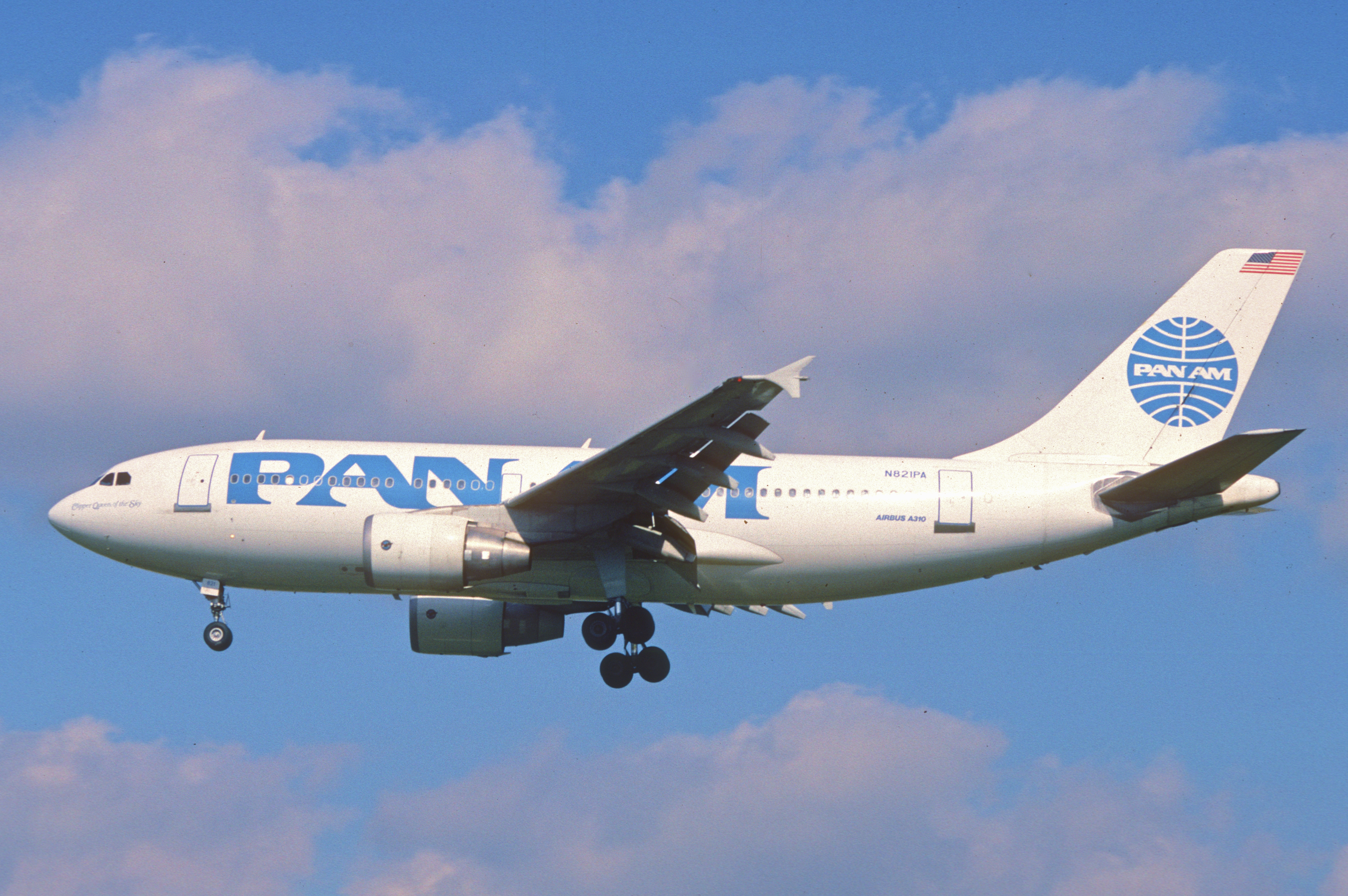
An A310 of Pan Am with a billboard livery (1990)

The 1970s saw the emergence of Billboard liveries. This places the airline title centrestage in the livery, often at the expense of the cheatline. Early adopters of Billboard liveries included UTA Union de Transports Aériens (UTA), Seaboard World Airlines, Hughes Airwest, and LOT Polish Airlines. Western's and Pan Am's final liveries were celebrated Billboard examples. In the 1990s and 2000s, two of the three main airline alliances adopted Billboard liveries for application to selected aircraft operated by alliance member airlines. Low-cost carriers such as Ryanair and Spirit Airlines have also employed the use of Billboard liveries on their aircraft.

=== Specialized liveries ===
==== Commemorative liveries ====
Commemorative liveries are used to celebrate a milestone in an airline’s history, including anniversaries. Some examples include:

In 2015, KLM painted a Boeing 777 in a special 'Orange Pride' livery, commemorating the country's national colour, which faded into the standard KLM blue livery.

In 2016, Aeroméxico painted a Boeing 787 in a special livery inspired by the Quetzalcōātl. The aircraft was used to transport athletes and delegation to the 2024 Summer Olympics.

In 2026, Lufthansa unveiled a celebratory livery for multiple aircraft to commemorate the airline's 100 year anniversary.

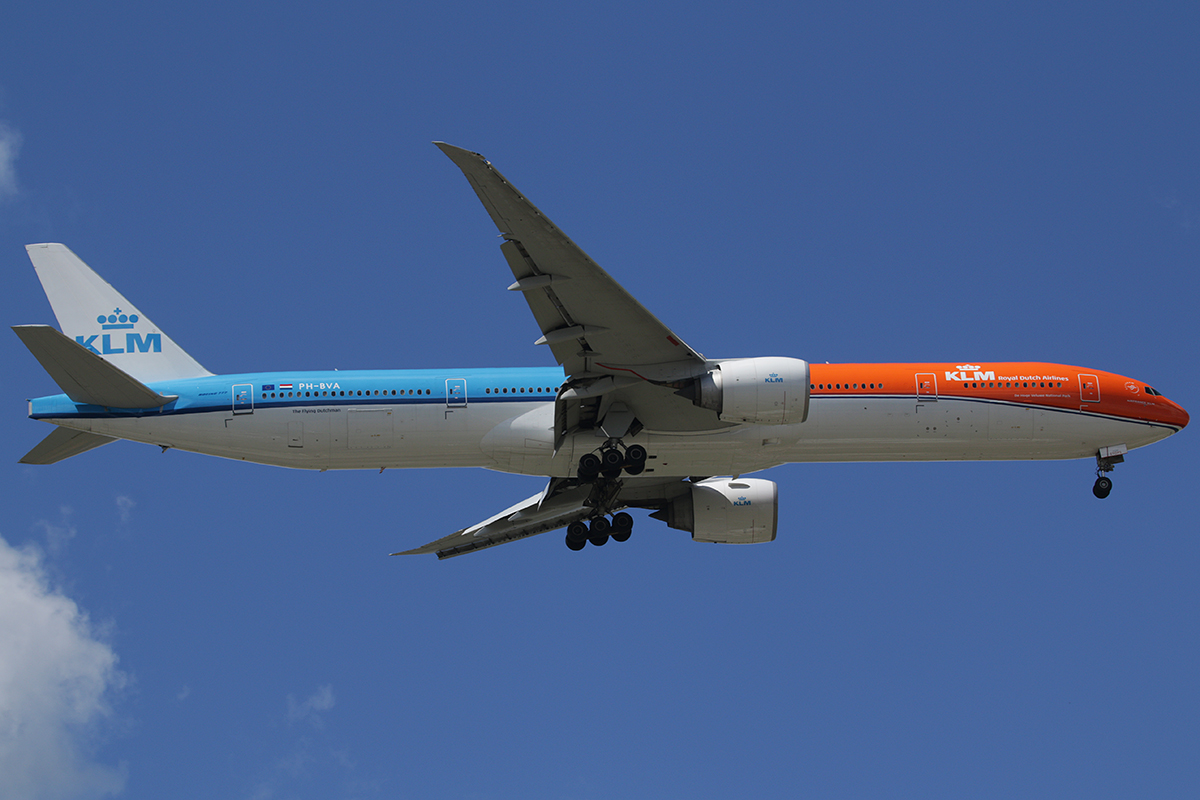
KLM 'Orange Pride' livery (2016)

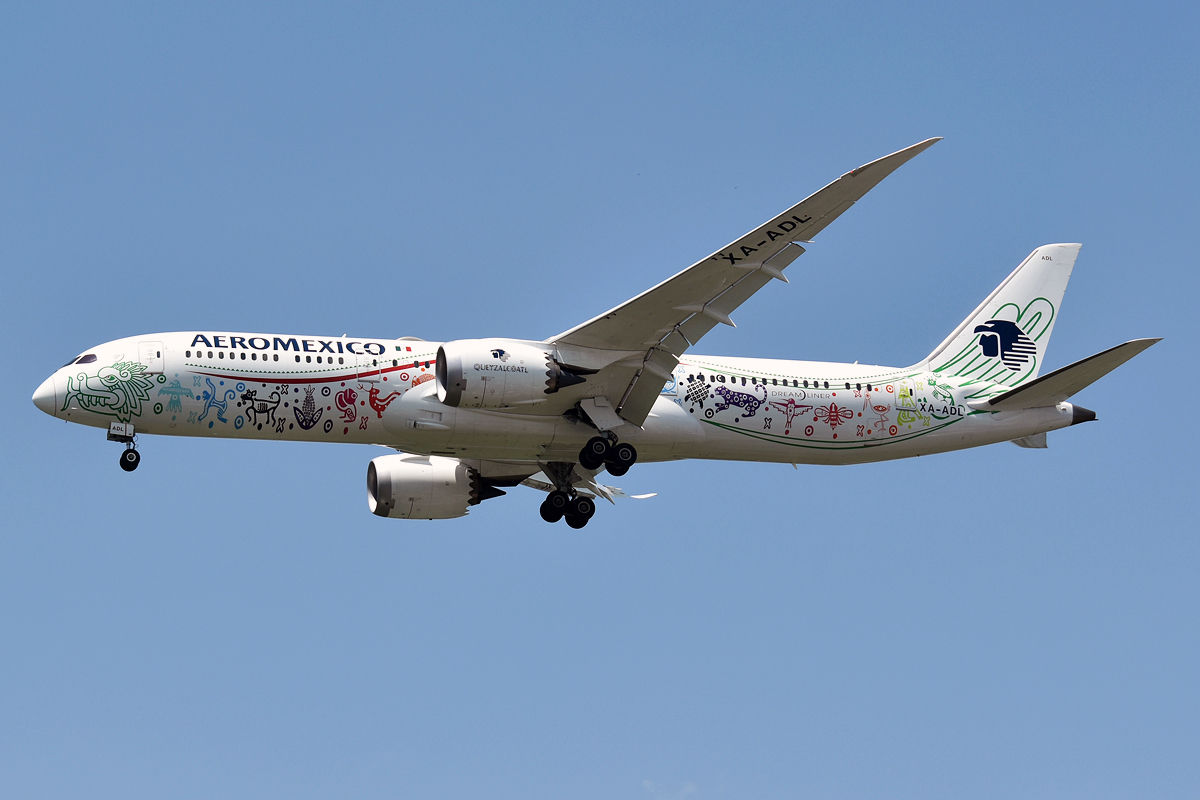
Aeromexico 'Quetzalcoatl' livery (2019)

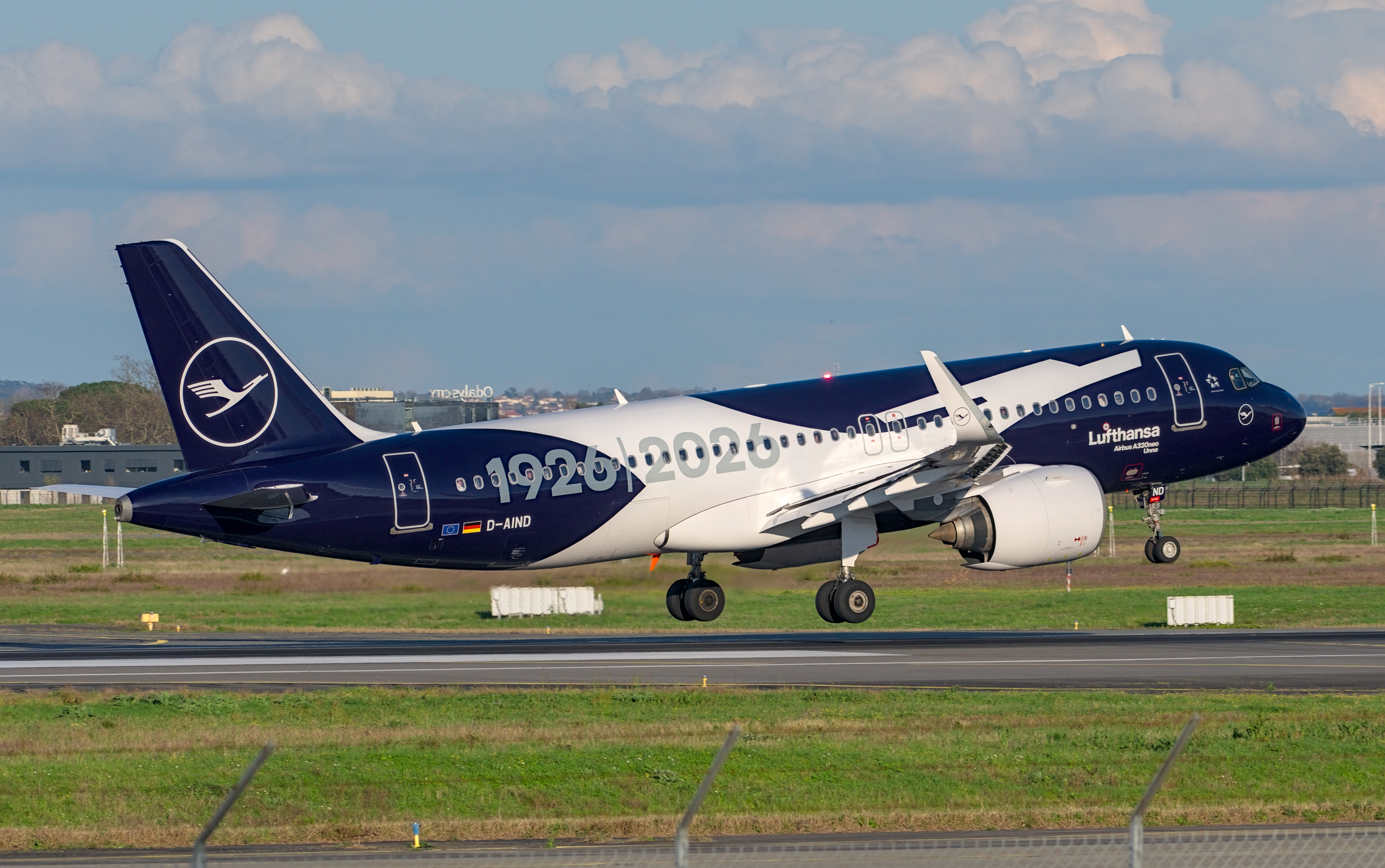
Lufthansa 100 years livery

==== Heritage or retro liveries ====
A heritage livery is a restoration of a past livery for publicity purposes or to stress the length of an airline's experience or tradition. Airlines, the media, and enthusiasts call aircraft painted in heritage liveries "Retrojets."

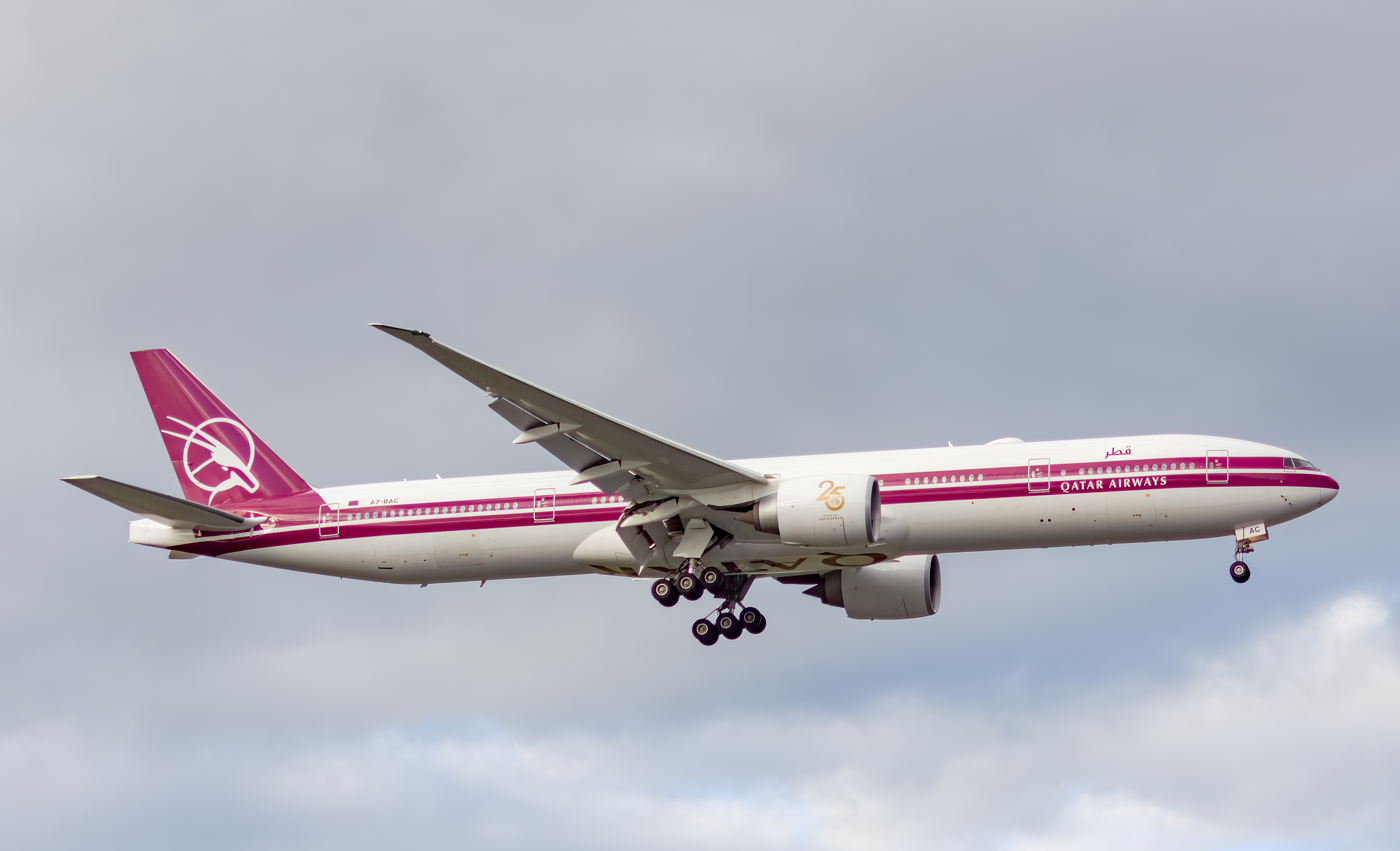
Qatar Airways Retro Livery on a Boeing 777 for the airline's 25th Anniversary (2022)

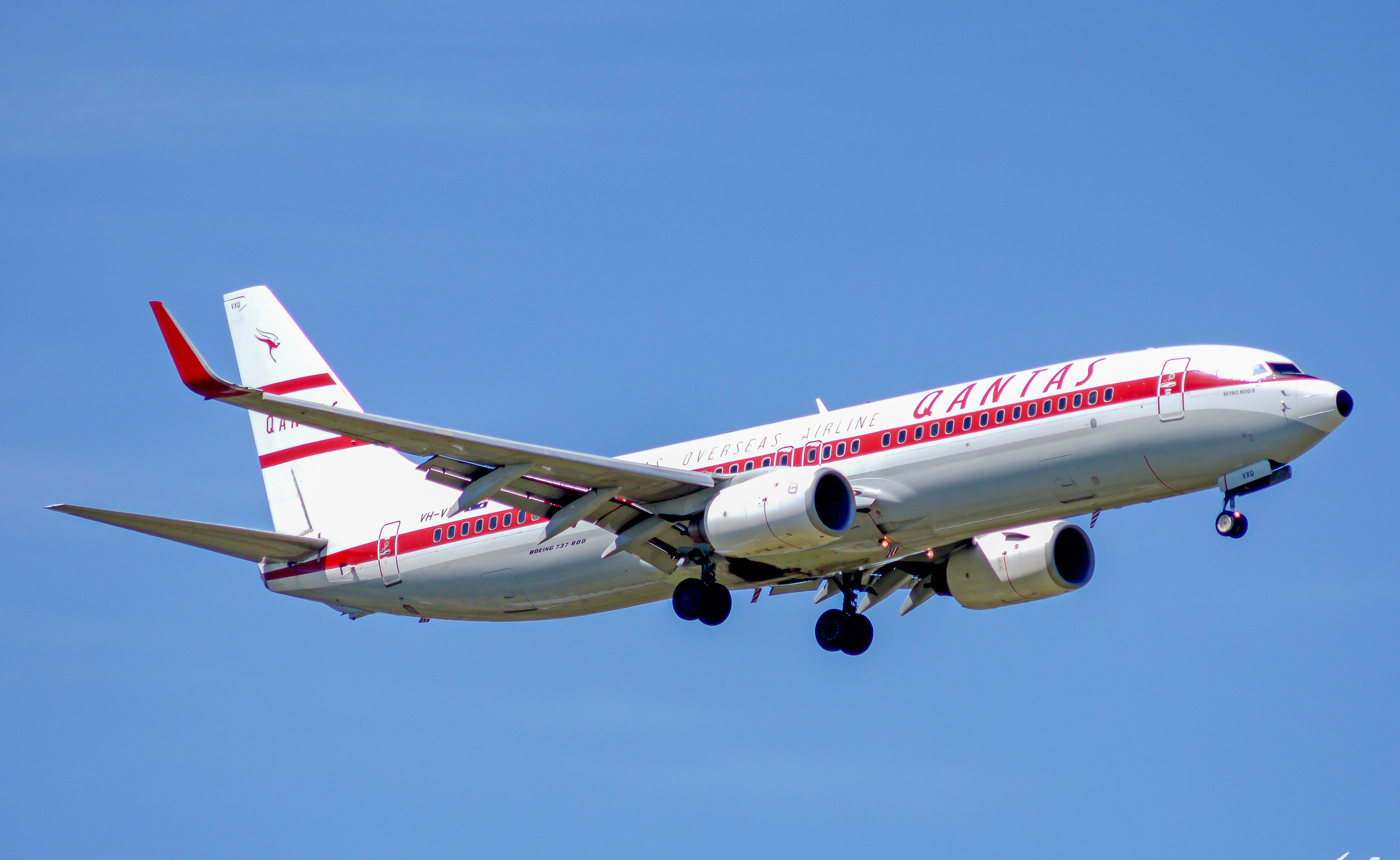
Qantas 'Retro Roo II' Livery on Boeing 737 (2017). The aircraft in question VH-VXQ is now painted back in a normal livery

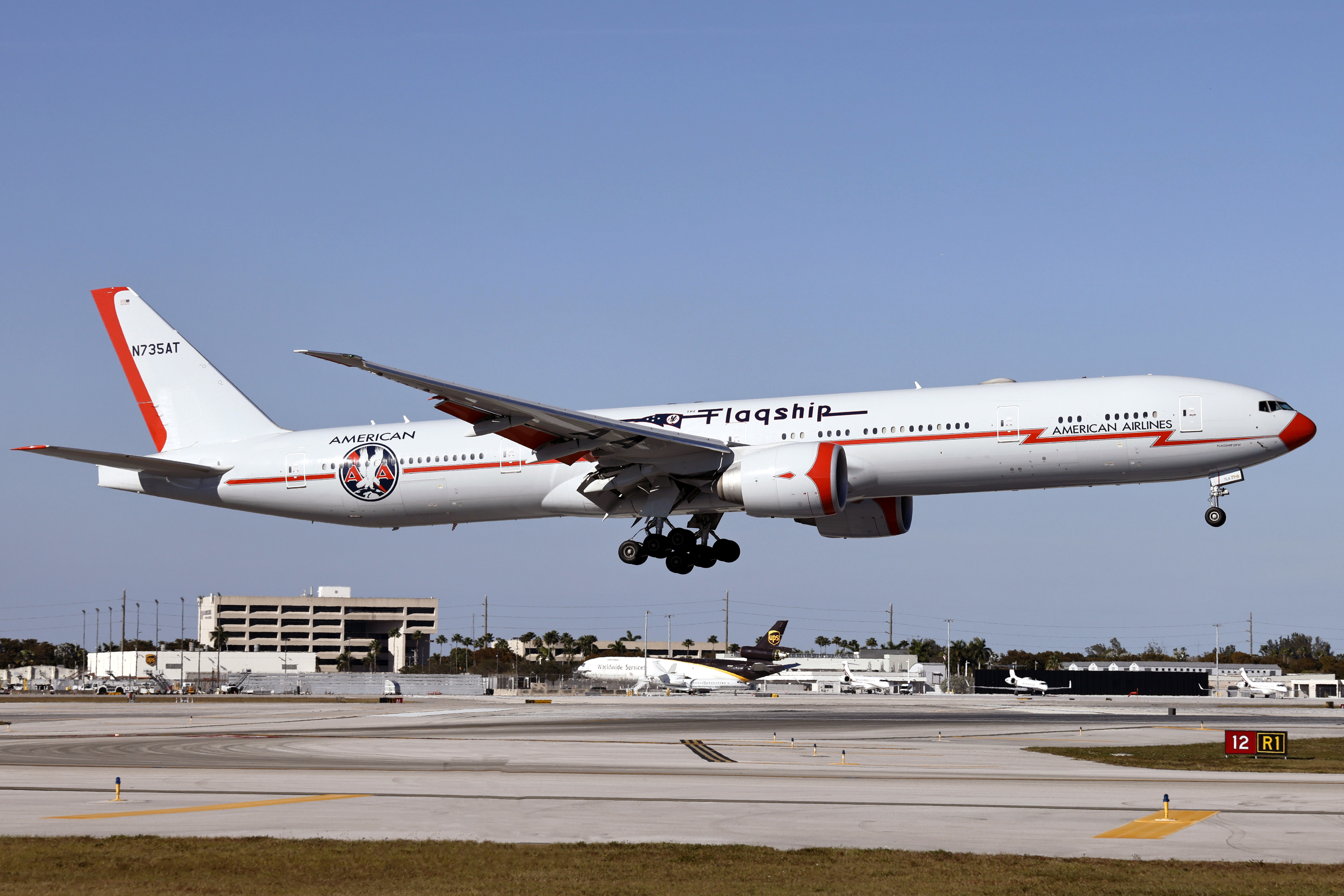
American Airlines retro livery on a Boeing 777 for the airline's 100th anniversary

==== Logo ====
Airlines often apply and paint specialized liveries to their standard airline liveries and logos of their aircraft.

- a logo when used for charter service; sports teams and touring rock bands are common examples
- a logo of a prominent charity, when the airline and charity have a partnership
- images of a city, usually a hub or other city of importance to the airline
- advertising for a company (logojet)

Southwest Airlines is famous for its various liveries promoting Sea World (painted to resemble an Orca), various US states where Southwest has operations (painted to resemble the states' flags), and other entities such as the NBA and the Ronald McDonald House.

Boeing painted a pre-delivery 747-8 to commemorate the Seattle Seahawks' 2014 National Football Conference Championship and appearance in Super Bowl XLVIII. The livery features the Seahawks logo and a "12" on the tail in reference to the team's fans, who are known collectively as "the 12th man." An update in 2015, with "In it to win it!" added to the aft fuselage, appeared in a flyover of Lake Washington during the Boeing Seafair Air Show in August of that year.

==== Marketing ====
Alaska Airlines has painted several aircraft in its fleet with promotional liveries for other companies such as its Disneyland, Star Wars: Galaxy's Edge, and "Go Cougs" liveries. All Nippon Airways has featured a number of aircraft in a promotional Pokémon livery, known as the Pokémon Jet. EVA Air partnered with Sanrio to create a number of "Hello Kitty Jets." Low-cost carriers like VietJet Air have designed its standard liveries so every aircraft are available to be instantly featured with promotional liveries.

In 2019 United Airlines ran a competition, Her Art Here, which invited female artists based in the United States to design aircraft liveries; the two winning designs were applied to Boeing 757-200s, one representing New York and New Jersey and the other California. Both aircraft were returned to United's standard livery in early 2025.

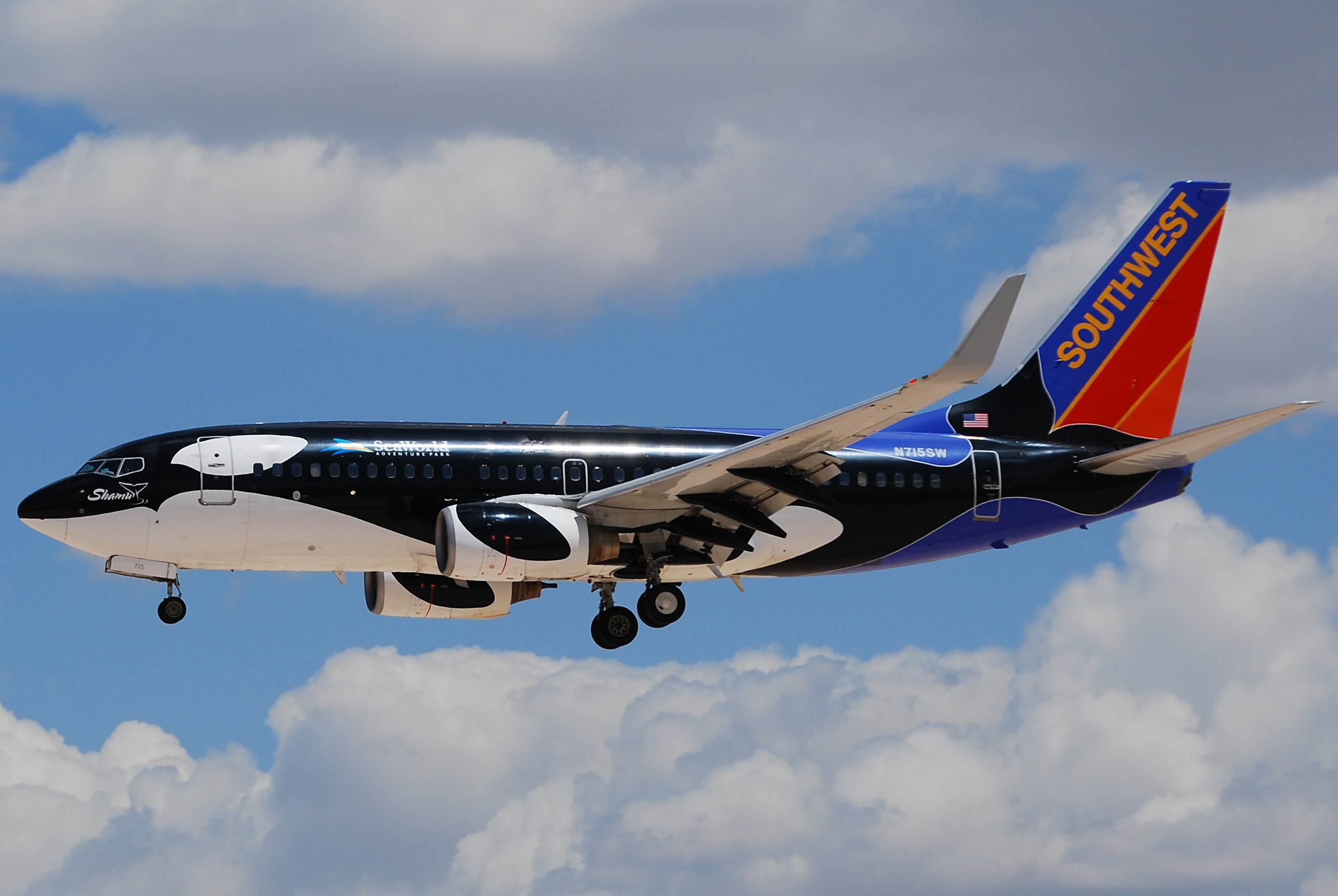
Southwest Airlines Orca livery promoting SeaWorld (2008)

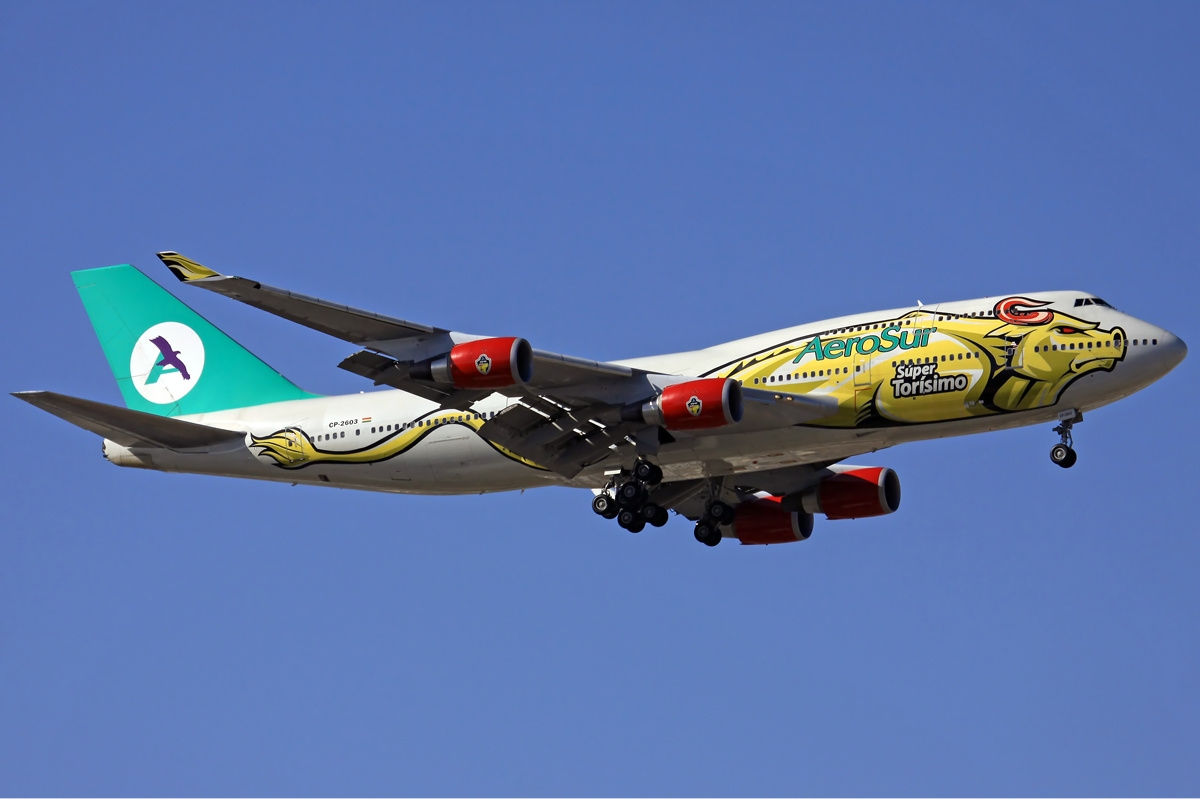
AeroSur "Super Torísimo" livery on its Boeing 747 promoting its new route to Madrid, famous for its bullfighting (2011)

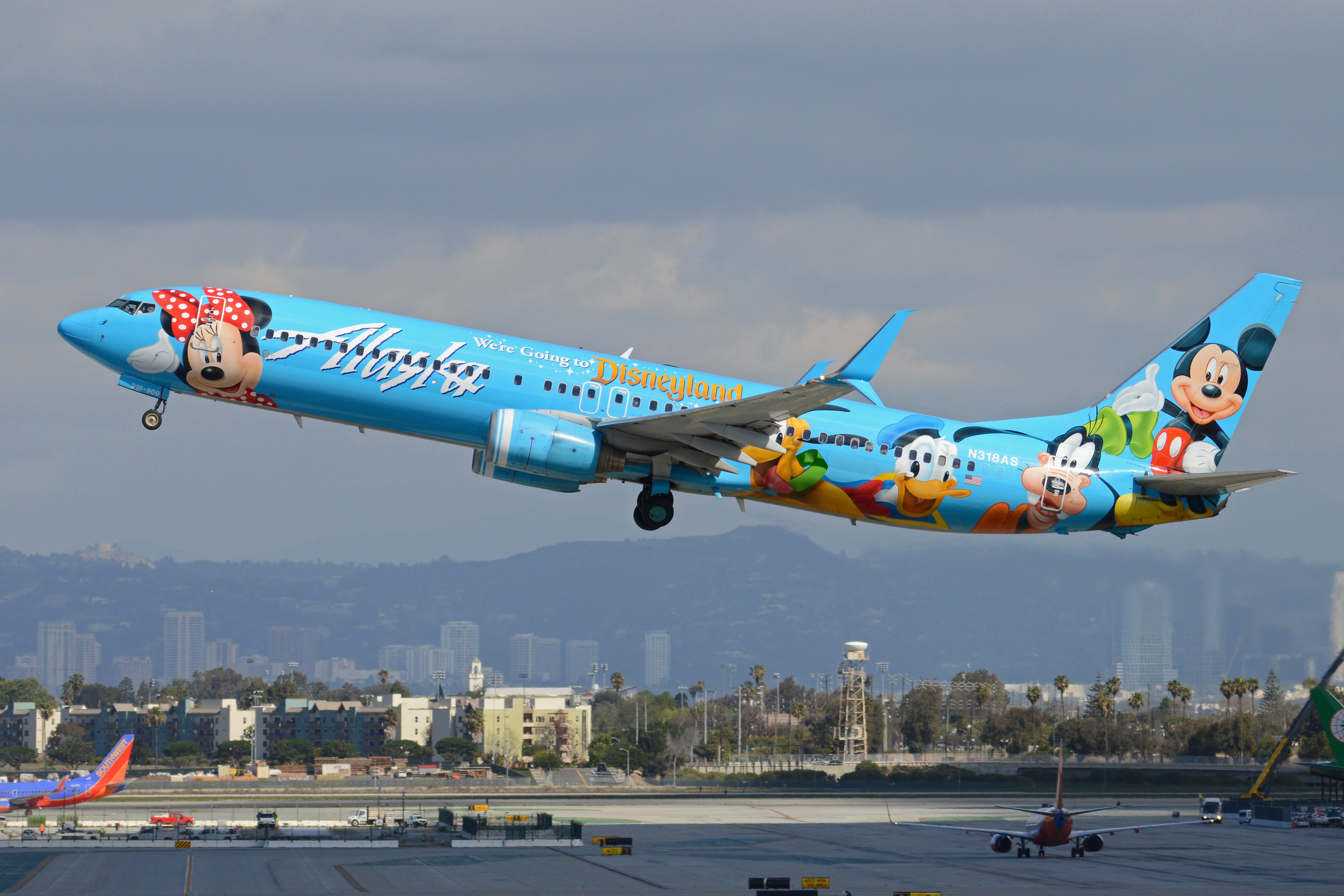
Alaska Airlines Spirit of Disneyland livery (2018)

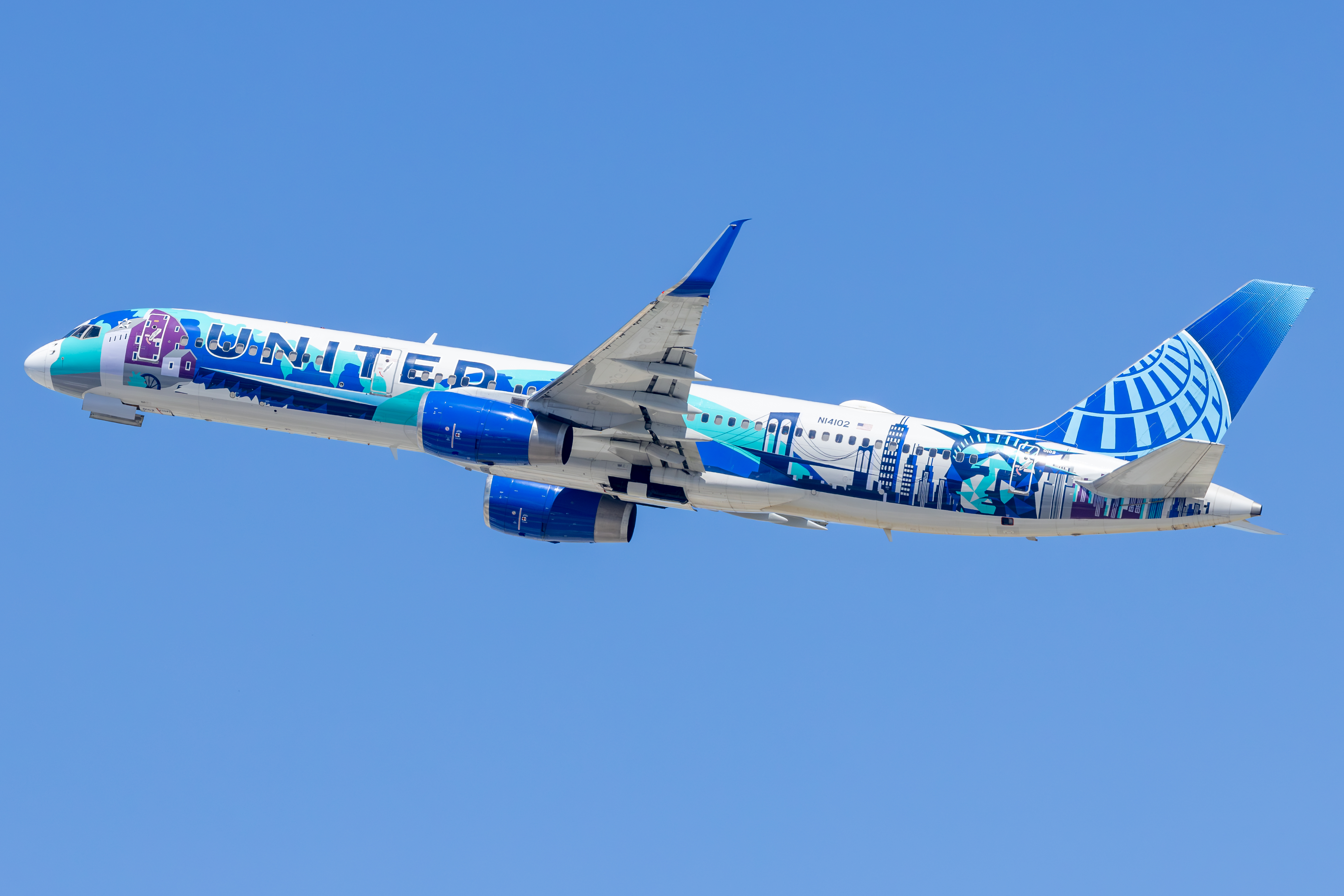
United Airlines Her Art Here livery for New York and New Jersey, designed by Corinne Antonelli (2023)

=== Other air marketing liveries ===
==== Alliance brands ====
Each of the three major airline alliances (Star Alliance, SkyTeam, and Oneworld) have standard commemorative liveries worn by some of its members' aircraft.

The standard Star Alliance livery was introduced in 2002, debuting with Asiana Airlines, however previous variations had been used since the alliance's founding in 1997. It features a white fuselage with the Star Alliance name painted in bold billboard titles, the airline's own logo underneath on the forward fuselage, and a black tail with the Star Alliance logo. Some variations exist, including Air New Zealand, which uses an all black fuselage and white titles.

The SkyTeam livery was unveiled in 2009 with Delta Air Lines. It features a silver fuselage with the SkyTeam title on the front section of the fuselage, and the airline's own logo underneath. The back portion features the blue SkyTeam ribbon, and the tail is dark blue with the SkyTeam logo.

The standard Oneworld livery was introduced in 2009, however some airlines had been using their own promotional liveries before this. The livery features the Oneworld name in large billboard titles across the fuselage, with a larger Oneworld logo, and the airline's own titles underneath. Unlike the other two alliances, the airline retains their standard tail fin and other livery elements.

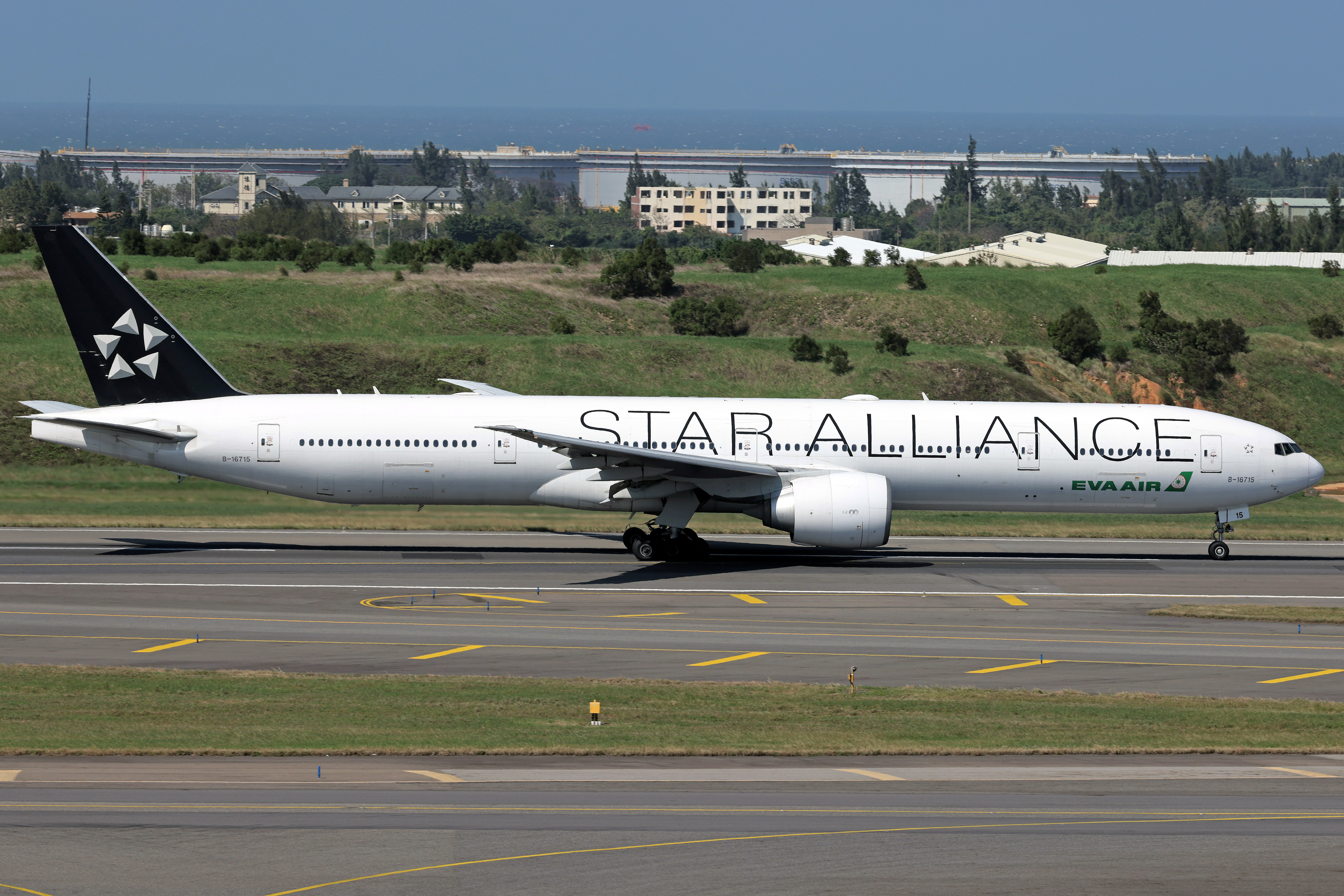
Star Alliance Boeing 777 of EVA Air (2025)

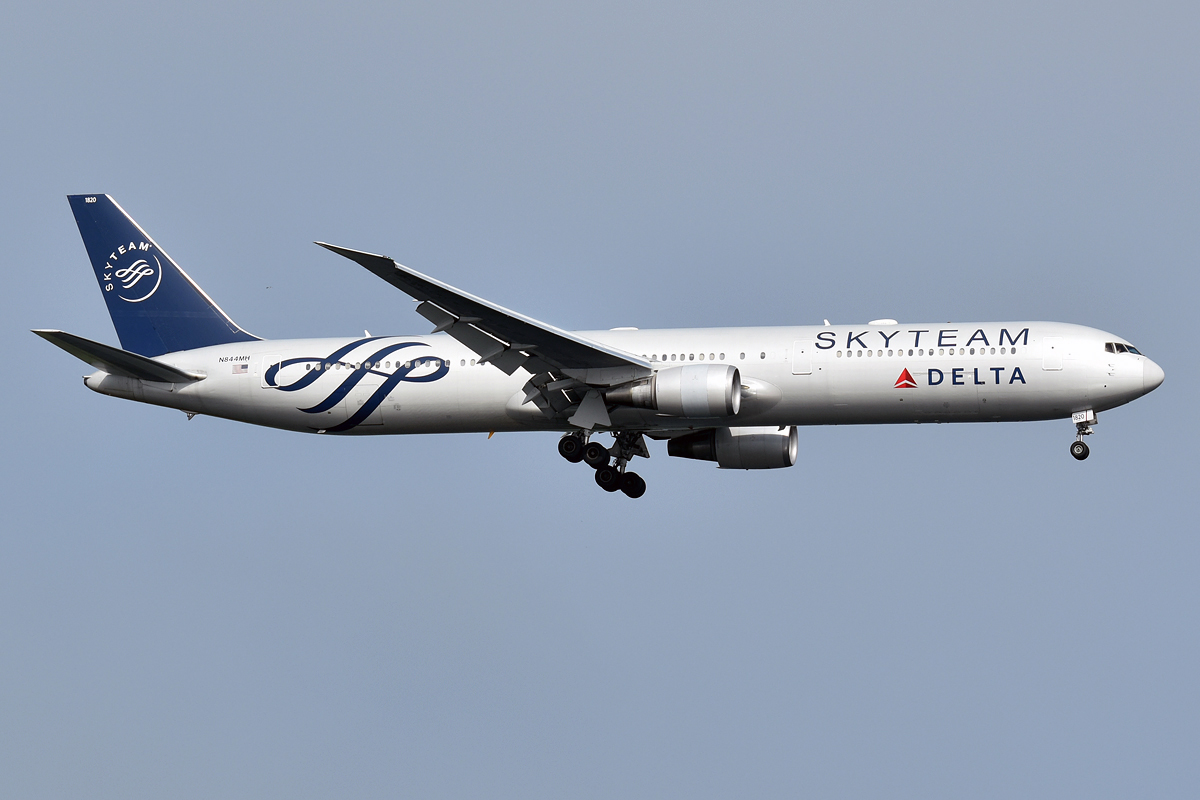
SkyTeam Boeing 767 of Delta Air Lines (2019)

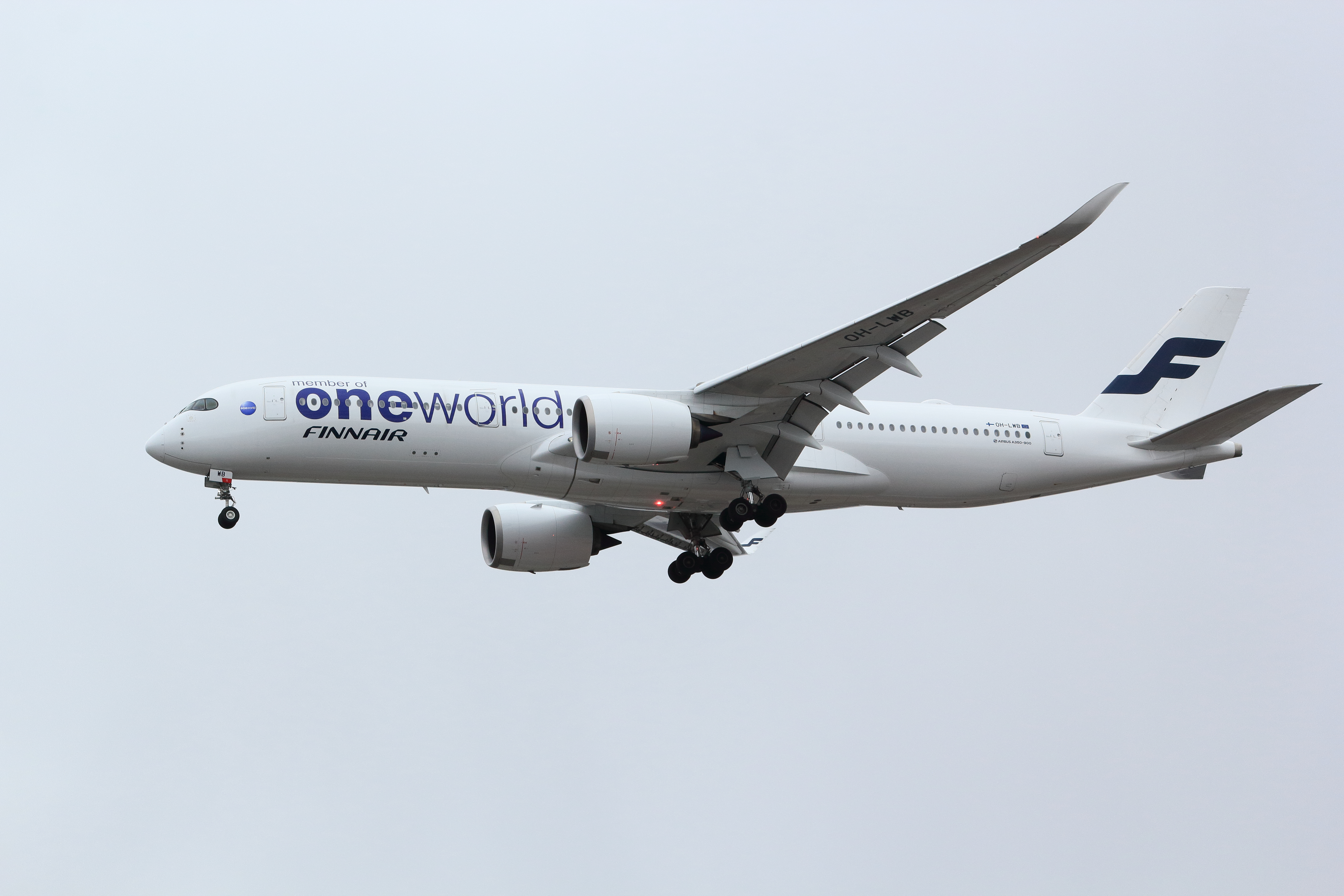
Oneworld Airbus A350 of Finnair (2017)

==== Regional brands ====
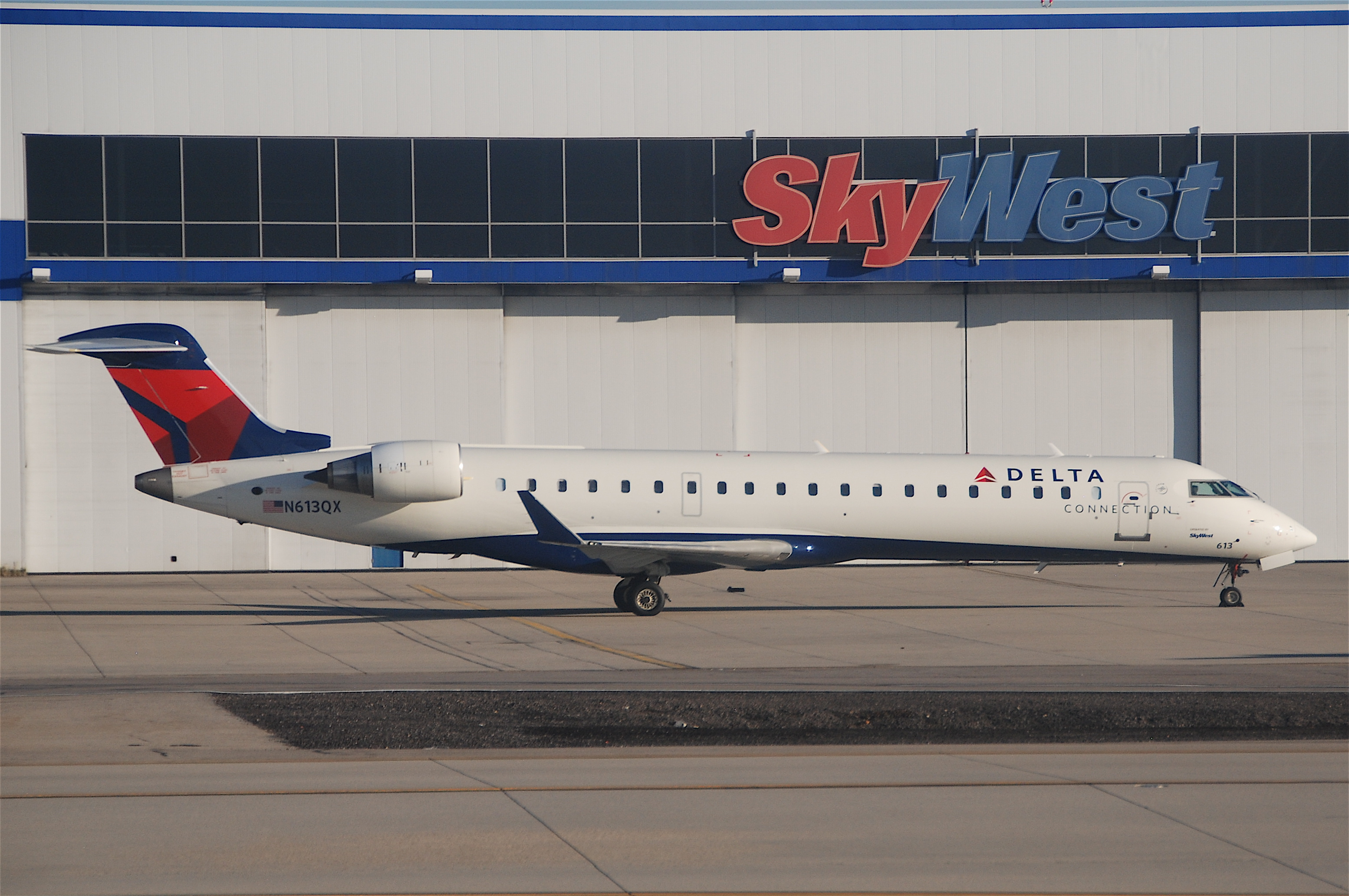
CRJ700 of SkyWest operated for Delta Connection (2011)

Similar in terms of how multiple different airlines fly aircraft in full branding of standard Oneworld, SkyTeam, and Star Alliance liveries, in the United States along with many other parts of the world, large airlines often operate in association with other airlines which operate much smaller regional airliners so smaller communities are linked to an airlines large airline hub.

To offer air travelers an association with them, major North American airlines have developed a system of air carriers.

These feeder airlines operate regional jets and other types of smaller utility air-taxi type aircraft, typically painted in ways that mimic (whether through distinctive fonts, colour combinations, or cheatline arrangements) the respective liveries of the operators with which they are affiliated. They may carry sub-branding such as Airlink, Connection, Eagle, or Express juxtaposed with the more widely recognised carrier name.

A recent trend in North America is for regional airlines d/b/a Express, Eagle, or Connection, to operate the aircraft in full mainline airline markings, leaving the operating regional airlines name in only very small letters, close to the forward entry door. Such brandings noted to cause confusion among travelers, as in the case of the Colgan Air Continental Connection Flight 3407 crash in which people identified the flight with Continental Airlines, although it was actually flown by Colgan Air.

== Non airline liveries ==
=== Government ===
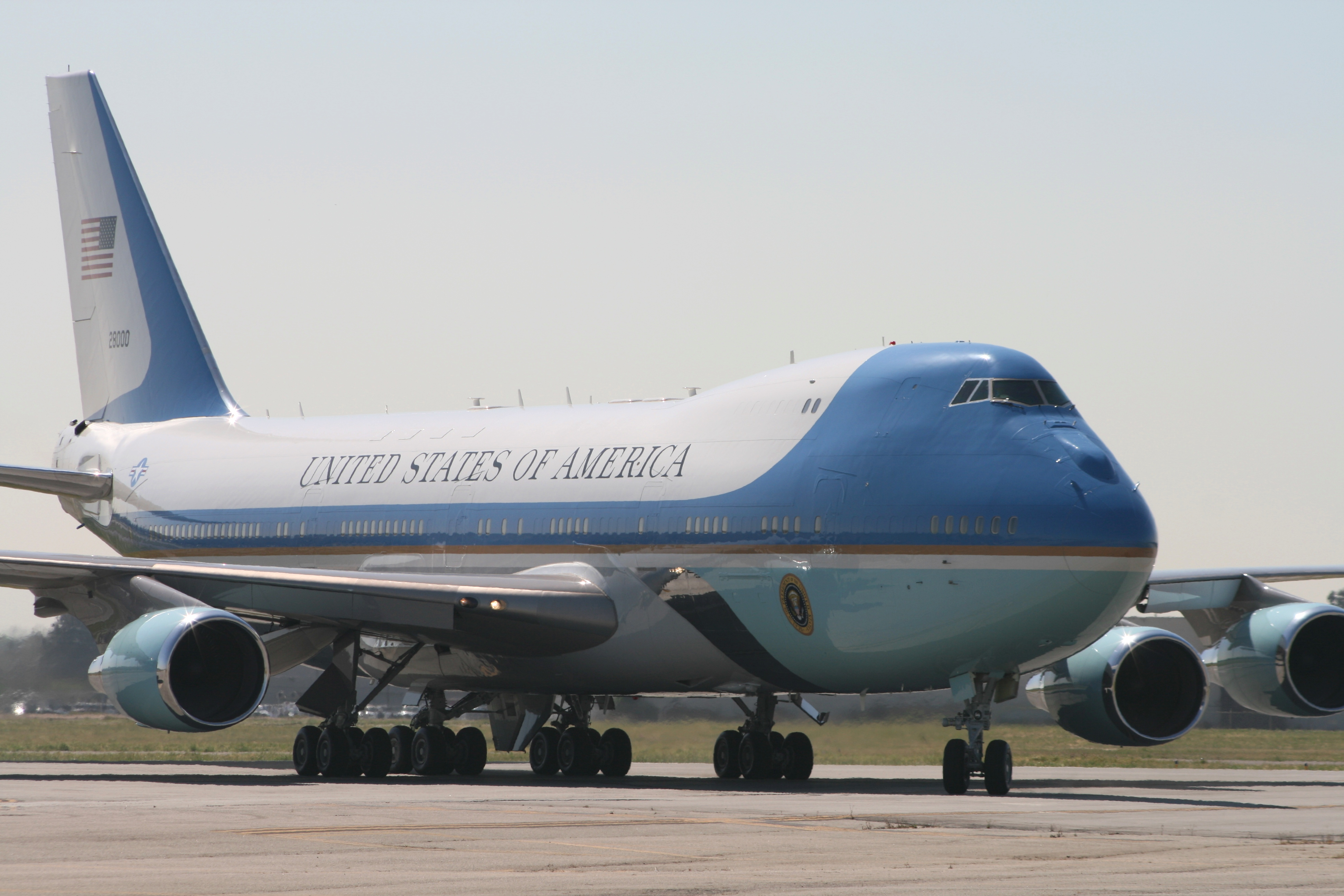
VC-25A in Air Force One livery, with the seal of the president of the United States (2013)

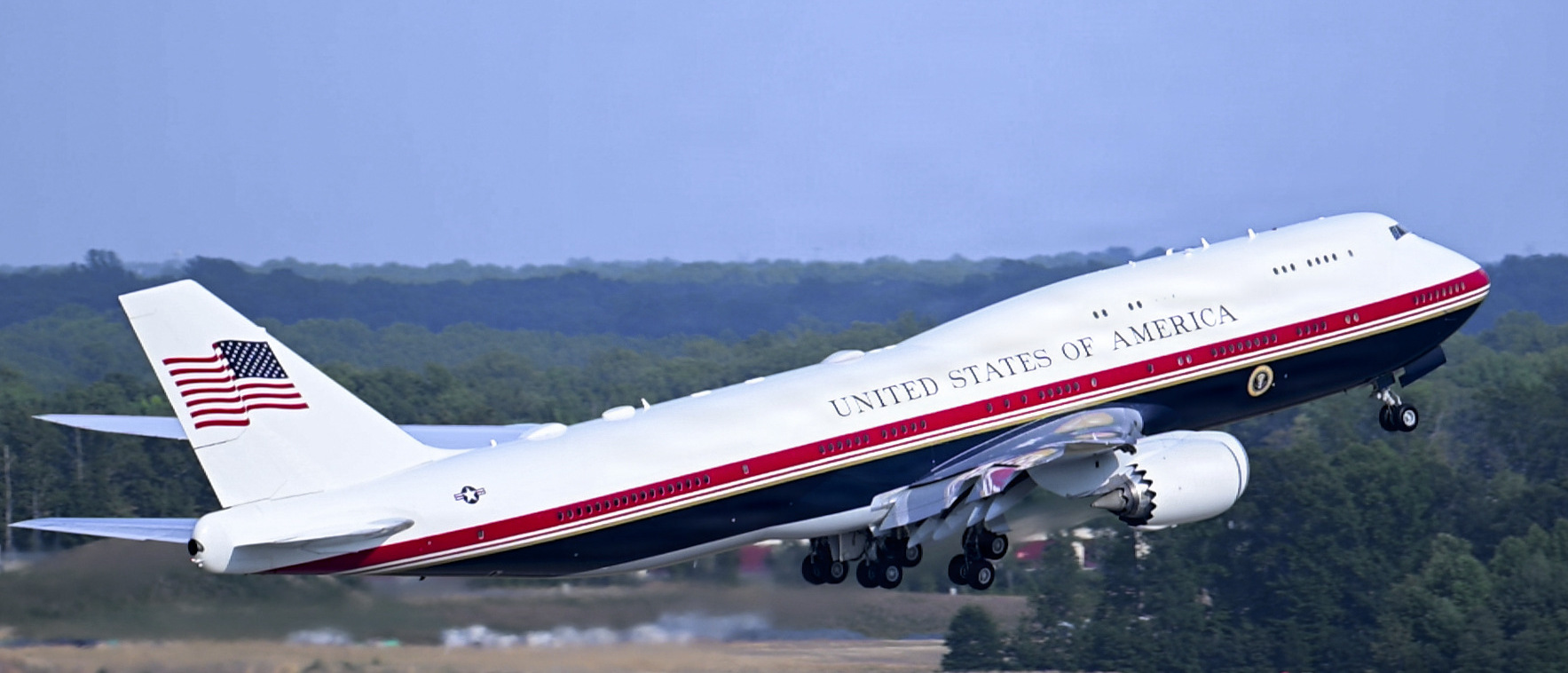
New VC-25B bridge with patriotic livery (2026)

Air transports of heads of state and government are often painted in unique color schemes. The U.S. president's aircraft, Air Force One, used a light-blue and sky-blue color scheme, with the seal of the president of the United States just above the front gear and the static flag of the United States on the tailfin. The livery was designed by French-American industrial designer Raymond Loewy at the instigation, and with the help of, then-First Lady Jacqueline Kennedy.

President Donald Trump struck a deal with Boeing to adorn the new VC-25Bs with a "patriotic color scheme" livery featuring a deep red stripe down the middle of the aircraft and a dark blue underbelly with waving American flag tailfin. After the political change of the 2020 election, Biden scrapped Trump's color scheme favoring the former robin's egg-blue Air Force One design made public in March 2023. However in 2026, the reelected Trump restored the patriotic livery for the two future VC-25Bs, as well as the interim Qatari aircraft and Air Force Two. The first VC-25B is scheduled to be delivered in 2027, while the second will come the following year.

Aircraft carrying state or government leaders are often liveried in national colors or the insignia of a particular government office.

=== Military ===
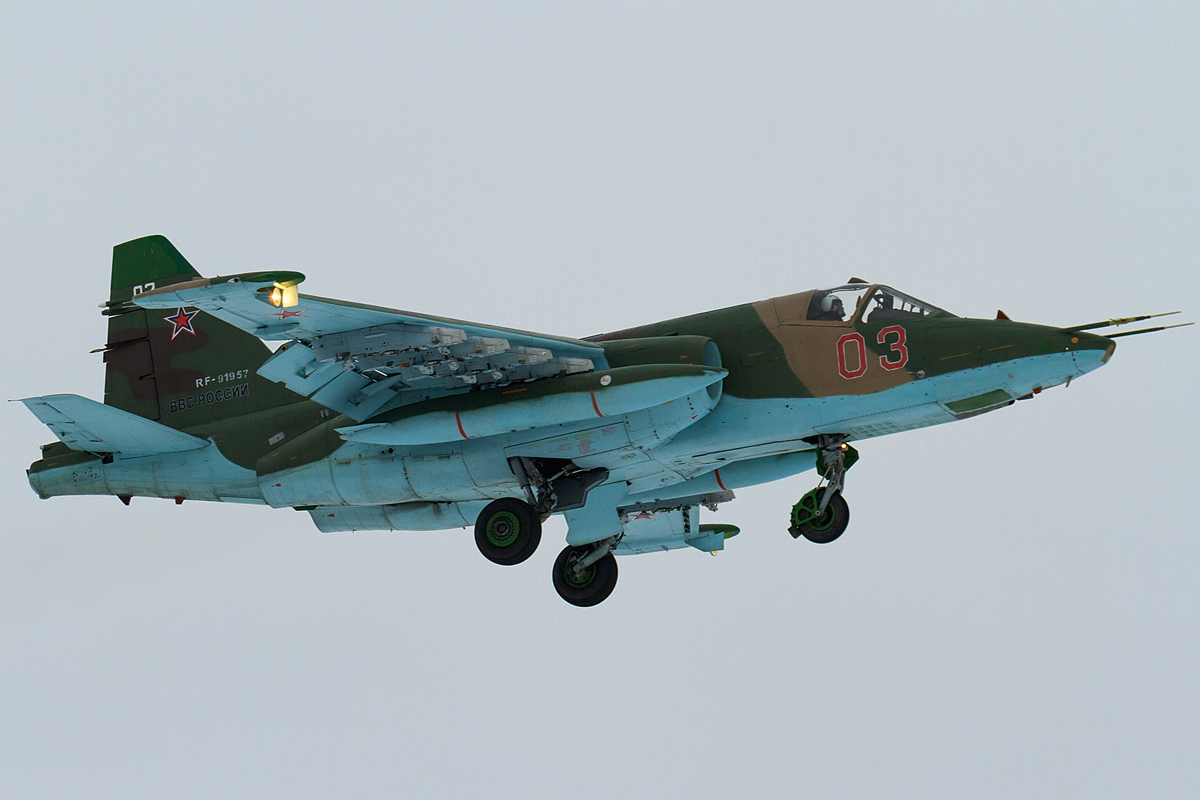
A Russian Air Force Sukhoi Su-25 with earth colors on the top and sky color on the bottom (2012)

Military aircraft often make use of aircraft camouflage to make the aircraft more difficult to see in the air and on the ground. This form of camouflage makes use of light and color patterns, and is dependent upon environmental conditions and is mainly effective against human observers, though some electronic visual acquisition systems can be affected. Visual camouflage does not protect an aircraft against radar location or heat-seeking electronics.

Since the release of MIL-STD-2161 in 1993, the US Navy's tactical aircraft use a color scheme designed to reduce visual detection that consists of shades of flat gray with exterior markings applied in a contrasting shade of gray. Note that the stated purpose of this document is to standardize paint schemes and application of naval insignia and markings.

Aircraft camouflage was first used during World War I and was employed extensively during the first half of World War II. After radar detection systems were developed, aircraft camouflage became less important to the Allies, and a number of late-war Allied aircraft were brought to battle with no camouflage. Subsequent camouflage schemes, when used, concentrated on hiding the aircraft from aerial observation while it was resting on or flying near the ground, or they used a light, neutral color to inhibit detection while in the air. Modern camouflage schemes have experimented with light-emitting active camouflage systems which seek to conceal the aircraft from human vision or to blur or confuse optical observation by electronic means.

== See also ==
- Aircraft camouflage
- Aircraft marking
- List of airline liveries and logos
- Antique aircraft
- Nose art
- Roundel
