= UAE (disambiguation) =

UAE commonly refers to the United Arab Emirates, a country in West Asia.

UAE or uae may also refer to:

== Science and technology ==
- UAE (emulator), a software emulator for the Commodore Amiga
- Unrecoverable Application Error, a Microsoft Windows 3.0 name for a general protection fault
- Uterine artery embolization, a medical procedure that blocks blood supply to uterine fibroids

== Other uses ==
- u.ae, the official government web portal of the United Arab Emirates
- Emirates (airline), one of the two flag carriers of the United Arab Emirates (ICAO airline code: UAE)

== See also ==
- Emirates (disambiguation)
