= Shepherd's Guide =

Series of instructional books for shepherds

"Shepherd's Guide" is the title given to several books, that were published to help shepherds identify stray herds. The books depict patterns of sheep marking, in the ear and on the wool, and name their owner with her/his residence.

One of the earliest Shepherd's Guide was prepared for parts of Cumberland by Joseph Walker, in 1817. Hosgson's 1849 Guide was delivered to a list of subscribers, while Gate's new shepherd's guide for Cumberland, Westmoreland, and Lancashire, of 1879, has numerous pages of advertisements. While all of those feature a detailed engraving of sheep (repeated with different marks), the books from the late 19th and 20th centuries have a line sketch. Some were designed as pocket-books, and others were bigger. The later books are attributed to various farmer associations, and cover a wider perimeter.

The books are useful as a genealogical and local history resource, and as collectibles.

== List of Shepherd's Guides ==
- Walker, J. (1817). The shepherd's guide. Penrith.
- Waugh, William; Atkinson, Richard; Collin, Thomas; Shepherd, John; Slack, Isaac (1819). The shepherd's guide: or, A delineation of the wool and ear marks on the different stocks of sheep on the east fells, extending from Clover Hill, in Knaresdale, on the east side; and from, Croglin to Stainmore, on the west side. To which is prefixed, an index; shewing the proprietors' names & places of abode. Appleby: Printed and published by J. Chapelhow.
- Kirkpatrick, William; Mounsey, Richard; Mattinson, John; Greenwood, James (1839). The shepherd's guide, or A delineation of the wool and ear marks, on the different stocks of sheep in Askham and Helton, Applethwaite and Troutbeck, Ambleside and Rydal Barton, Bampton, Grasmere, Hawkshead, Kentmere, Long-Sleddale, Martindale, Measand and Mardale, Over Staveley, Patterdale, Rosgill and Shap, Swindale and Wetsleddale: to which is prefixed an index, shewing the proprietors' names and places of abode ... Penrith: Printed by James Brown.
- Hodgson, William (1849). The shepherd's guide, or A delineation of the wool and ear marks of the different stocks of sheep in Lancashire, Cumberland, and Westmorland. Ulverston: printed by S Soulby, Advertiser office.
- Gate, Daniel (1879). Gate's new shepherd's guide for Cumberland, Westmoreland, and Lancashire. Cockermouth: Cockermouth.
- Wilson, Thomas (1913). Wilson's new shepherds' guide for Cumberland, Westmorland and Lancashire. Lancaster: Printed by R. Brash, and Eaton and Bulfield.
- The Shepherds' guide: being an amalgamated association comprising the following societies: the East, South, and North Fells Associations ... Barnard Castle: Printed by Harry Ward. 1919.
- Lamb, R. H (1937). Lamb's shepherds guide for Cumberland, Westmorland and Lancashire. Penrith: Herald.
- National Farmers' Union; Westmorland (South) County Branch (1967). The shepherds' guide. Place of publication not identified: National Farmers' Union.
- Shepherds' Guide Association (1970). The shepherds guide 1970: being an amalgamated association comprising the following societies: - the East, South & North Fells Associations including certain parts of unenclosed lands ... within the counties of Yorkshire, Westmorland, Cumberland, Durham and Northumberland; and giving a proper account of the members' names ... also a proper delineation of the ... marks of all the members' sheep ... Consett: Ramsden Williams ... for the Shepherds Guide Association.
