= Aircraft marking =

Aircraft markings are symbols and annotations painted on aircraft, primarily for visual identification. Types of aircraft markings include:

- Aircraft registration, unique alphanumeric string that identifies every aircraft
- Invasion stripes, alternating black and white bands painted on the fuselages and wings of World War II Allied aircraft, for the purpose of increased recognition by friendly forces
- Military aircraft insignia, applied to military aircraft to identify the nation or branch of military service
  - United Kingdom
    - Royal Air Force roundels, a circular identification mark used since 1915, United Kingdom
    - United Kingdom military aircraft registration number, the alpha-numeric registration used to identify individual military aircraft
  - Royal Canadian Air Force, roundels used from 1920–1945
  - Hungarian Air Force, a set of aligned triangles which points toward the front of the aircraft
  - Romanian Air Force#Aircraft markings, roundels on military vehicles and aircraft that use the colours of the Romanian flag
  - Serbian Air Force and Air Defence, an adapted version of the former Royal Yugoslav Air Force roundel that was officially adopted in 2006
  - South African Air Force, roundels adopted in 2002 that are distinct from the Army
  - United States:
    - United States military aircraft national insignia, a listing of the nationality markings used by military aircraft of the United States
    - United States military aircraft serials, the serial numbers used to identify individual military aircraft
    - USAAF unit identification aircraft markings, an identification code to identify the unit to which U.S. aircraft are assigned
    - Tail code, markings, usually on the vertical stabiliser of U.S. military aircraft, that help to identify the unit and base assignment
- Nose art, decorative painting or design on the fuselage of an aircraft, often applied during conflicts
- Mission marks, monochrome stencil representations on the fuselage (typically adjacent to the cockpit) of individual ordinance items delivered during conflict by that specific aircraft
- List of air forces provides the markings used by each military organisation, with historical examples.

== See also ==
- Aircraft livery, the full graphic treatment of aircraft, often for branding
- Marking (disambiguation)
