= Vehicle markings of the United States military =

Markings used by the US Army to foster accountability and promote attention to detail

United States Army vehicles must be marked with a unit designation to foster accountability and promote attention to detail during maintenance operations. The term "bumper number" refers the combination of numbers and letters on the front and rear of a vehicle that uniquely identify that vehicle.

There are many regulations that govern the use of bumper numbers. These regulations serve to standardize markings across the Army in order to improve efficiency and ensure markings add to combat readiness.

The appearance of bumper numbers is a quick and representative sampling of the maintenance status of a unit. Proficiency in marking vehicles is an excellent indicator of deeper and more substantial efficacy of a unit. Bumper numbers also serve to provide a quick reference for identification and minimize confusion in the fog of war.

== Applicable Army regulations ==
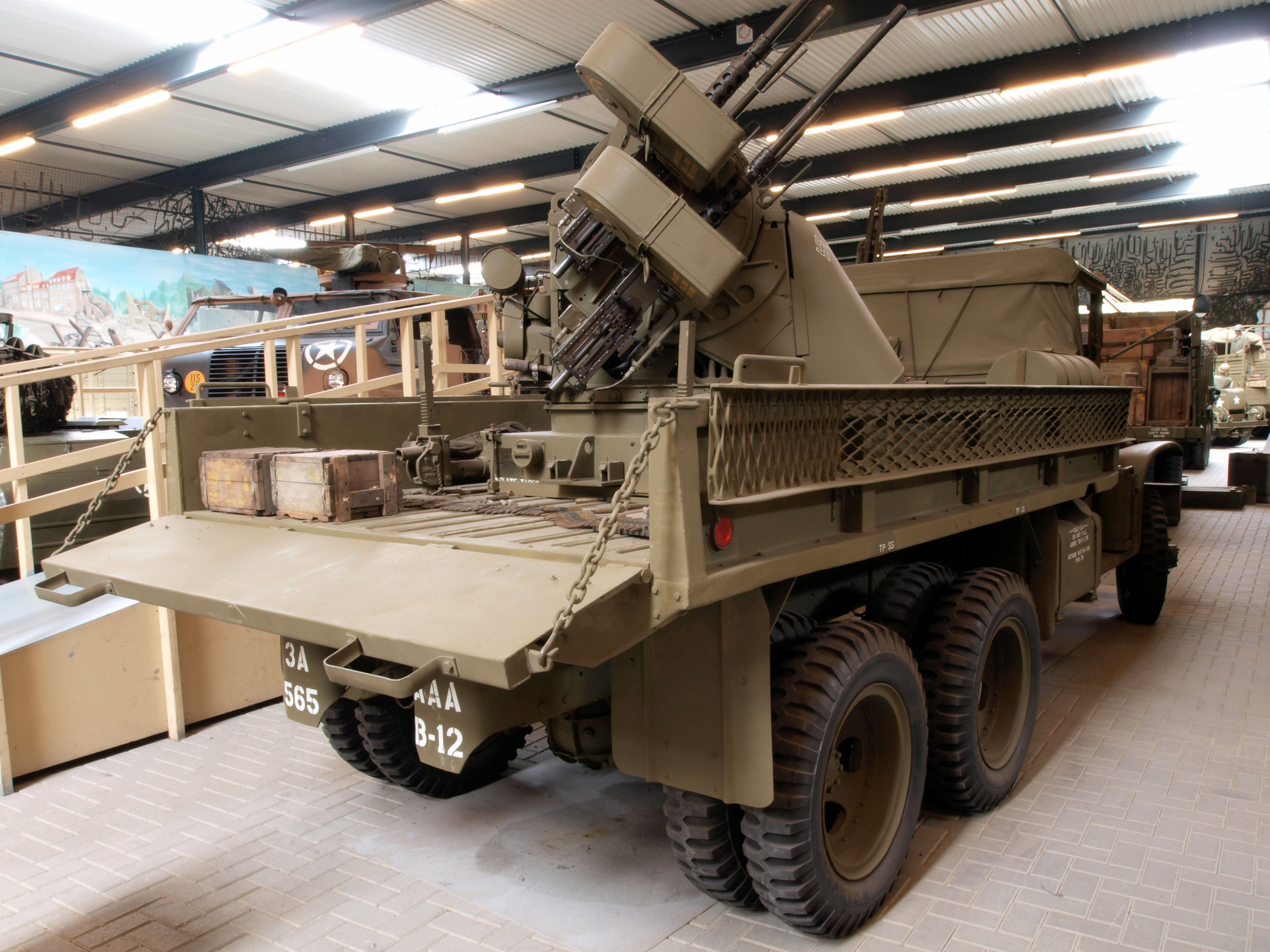
US Army CCKW-353 truck displaying bumper markings. These indicate 3rd Army, 565th Anti-Aircraft Automatic Weapons Battalion, B Battery, 12th vehicle.

Army Technical Bulletin 43-0209, Color, Marking, and Camouflage Painting of Military Vehicles, Construction Equipment and Materials Handling Equipment, standardizes how vehicle bumper numbers are applied. The markings are divided into four positions. Positions 1 and 2 are applied on the left, while positions 3 and 4 are applied on the right. The positions identify

1. The major command, organization or activity the equipment is associated with;
2. The intermediate organization or activity;
3. The unit that operates and maintains the vehicle; and
4. The specific vehicle number (often associated with the order of march).

Anything beyond this policy such as assigning a specific number against a specific unit position is a matter of unit standard operating procedure. However, the number six has traditionally been associated with the commander of the element. For example, a Humvee assigned to the commander of Charlie Company would be designated "C06," while the 1st Platoon, Charlie Company's command vehicle would be "C16," 2nd Platoon would be "C26," etc.

Army Technical Bulletin 43-0139, Painting and Instructions for Army Materiel, gives information about applying ID markings over camouflage colors. Black lettering must be used over brown or green paint, green lettering over black paint, and brown lettering over white or tan paint. There are only two authorized methods of making bumper numbers: using adhesive vinyl (stickers) and paint.

Army Regulation 750-1, Army Materiel Maintenance Policy, allows MACOM commanders to conceal bumper numbers in tactical conditions. Overseas commanders may comply with international agreements regarding vehicle bumper numbers. Some overseas commands paint solid light color rectangular boxes as the background for bumper numbers.

== See also ==
- Comparative Military Ranks
- JROTC
- Timeline of United States military operations
- ROTC
- Transformation of the United States Army
- United States Army Center of Military History
- U.S. Army Soldier's Creed
