= Lamb marking =

Lamb marking is the term applied to the procedure of earmarking, castration and tail-docking of the lambs of domestic sheep. Vaccination is usually carried out then, too. Sheep are usually ear marked at approximately 3 months of age after lambing (birth). Lambs are castrated to prevent full development of reproductive organs and hormones. Ear marking is used to identify each lamb in the flock and tail-docking is usually carried out to prevent blowfly strike. At some stage, blow-flies lay their eggs within moist and warm areas (breech region) of the sheep. Then, the maggots grow and eat away the live flesh of the sheep. This causes great distress and pain for the lamb. Sometimes lambs are also mulesed (triangular cuts to the skin around the lamb's anus). This is also carried out for the same reason.

These operations are carried out to improve the survival rates of the lambs.

== See also ==
- Sheep husbandry
- Ear tag
- Shepherd's Guide
