= Emirates =

Emirates may refer to:

- United Arab Emirates, a country in Asia
- Emirate, a territory governed by an emir
  - Emirates of the United Arab Emirates, the individual emirates
- The Emirates Group, a holding company in the United Arab Emirates
  - Emirates (airline), an airline subsidiary of The Emirates Group
- Emirates Foundation, an Abu Dhabi–based foundation (charity) established by Amiri decree
- Emirates Scout Association, the national Scouting organization of the United Arab Emirates
- Emirates Hills, a gated community in Dubai
- E 311 road (United Arab Emirates), formerly known as "Emirates Road", a road extending between Dubai and Ras al-Khaimah
- Emirates Palace, a luxury hotel in Abu Dhabi
- Emirates (Dubai Metro), a railway station near Dubai International Airport

== Towers ==
- Emirates Crown, a 63-floor residential tower in the Dubai Marina in Dubai
- Emirates Park Towers Hotel & Spa, a twin-tower complex under construction in Dubai
- Emirates Towers, a complex containing the Emirates Office Tower and Jumeirah Emirates Towers Hotel skyscrapers
  - Emirates Office Tower, a 54-floor office building along Sheikh Zayed Road in Dubai
  - Jumeirah Emirates Towers Hotel, a 56-floor hotel tower along Sheikh Zayed Road in Dubai

== Sports ==
- Emirates Club, an association football club in the city of Ras al-Khaimah
  - Emirates Club Stadium, a stadium in Ras al-Khaimah
- Emirates Airline Park, a rugby union/football stadium in Johannesburg
- Emirates Stadium, an association football stadium in London
- Emirates Cup, a football tournament held at Arsenal's Emirates Stadium
- Emirates Stakes, a horserace held as part of the Melbourne Cup Carnival
- MI Emirates, a cricket team based in Abu Dhabi, affiliated with the Mumbai Indians

== Others ==
- Emirates Air Line, former name of the London Cable Car over the River Thames in London, UK

== See also ==
- UAE (disambiguation)
