= Marking Time (disambiguation) =

Marking Time is an Australian television series.

Marking Time may also refer to:

- Military mark time, drill command and expression
- "Marking Time", a song by The Olivia Tremor Control from Music from the Unrealized Film Script: Dusk at Cubist Castle
