= US Airways fleet =

List of aircraft operated by US Airways

US Airways operated a predominantly Airbus fleet, with some older Boeing aircraft and a small fleet of Embraer jets. Following its merger with American Airlines, it became part of the American Airlines fleet in 2013.

== Final fleet ==
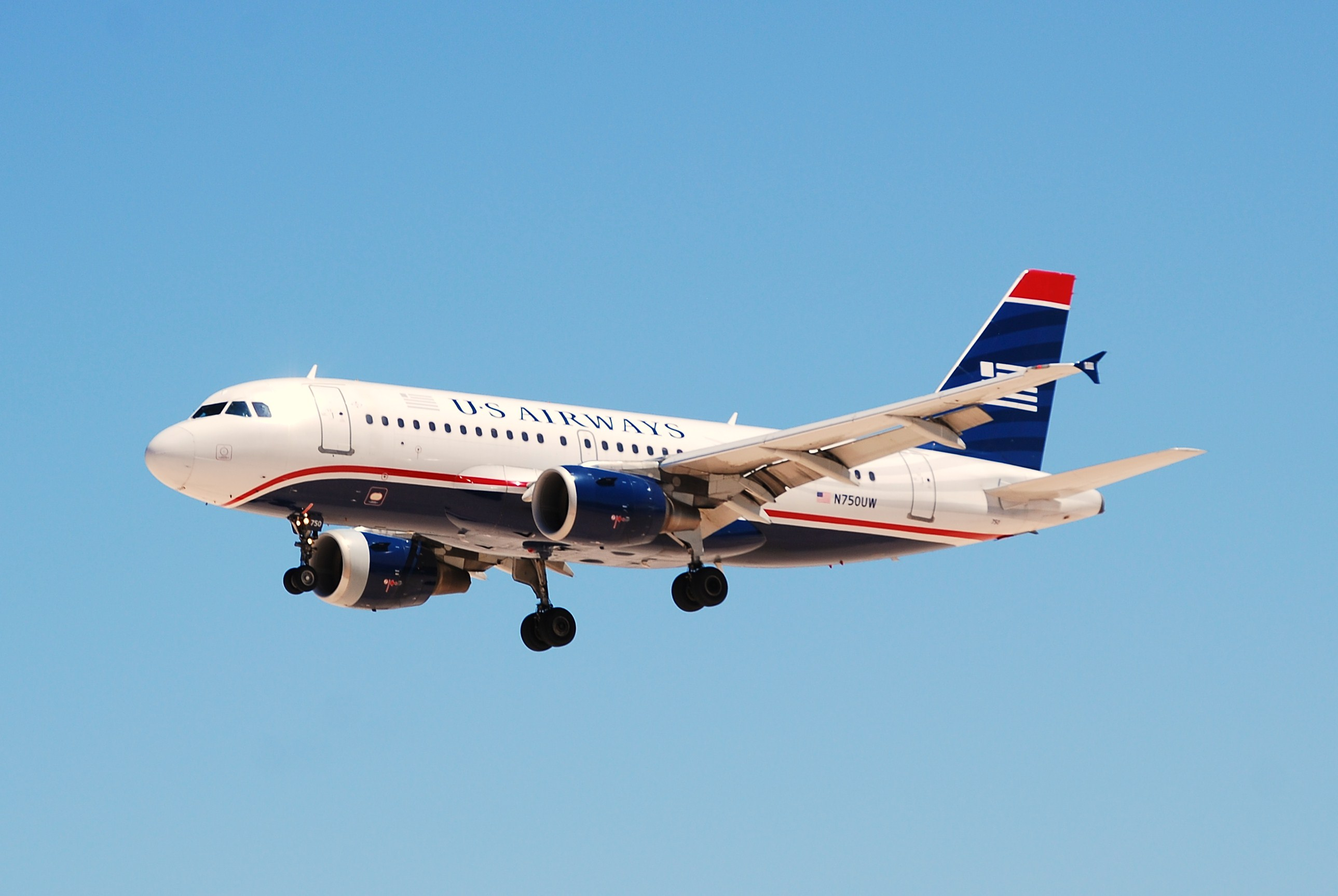
Airbus A319-100

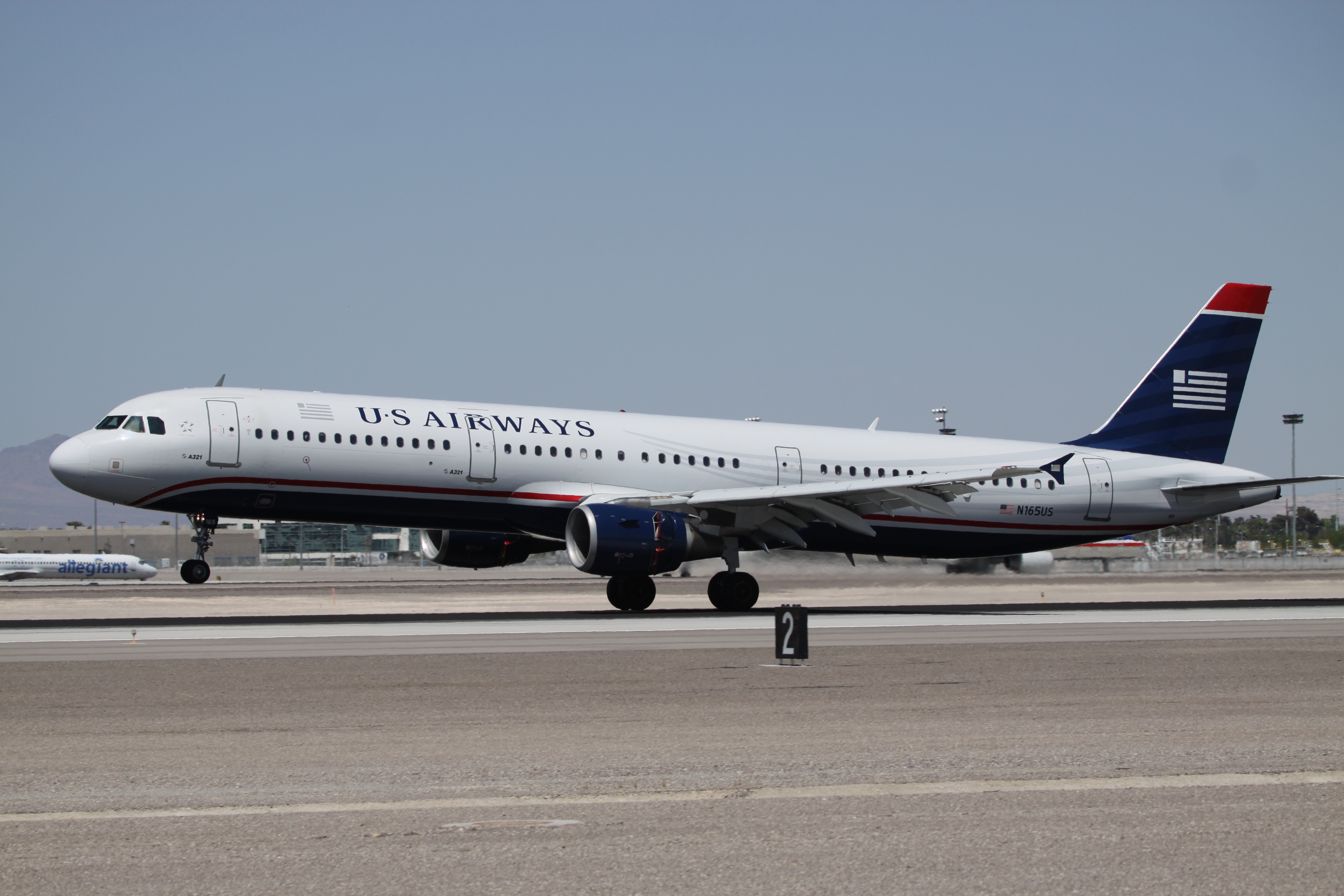
Airbus A321-200

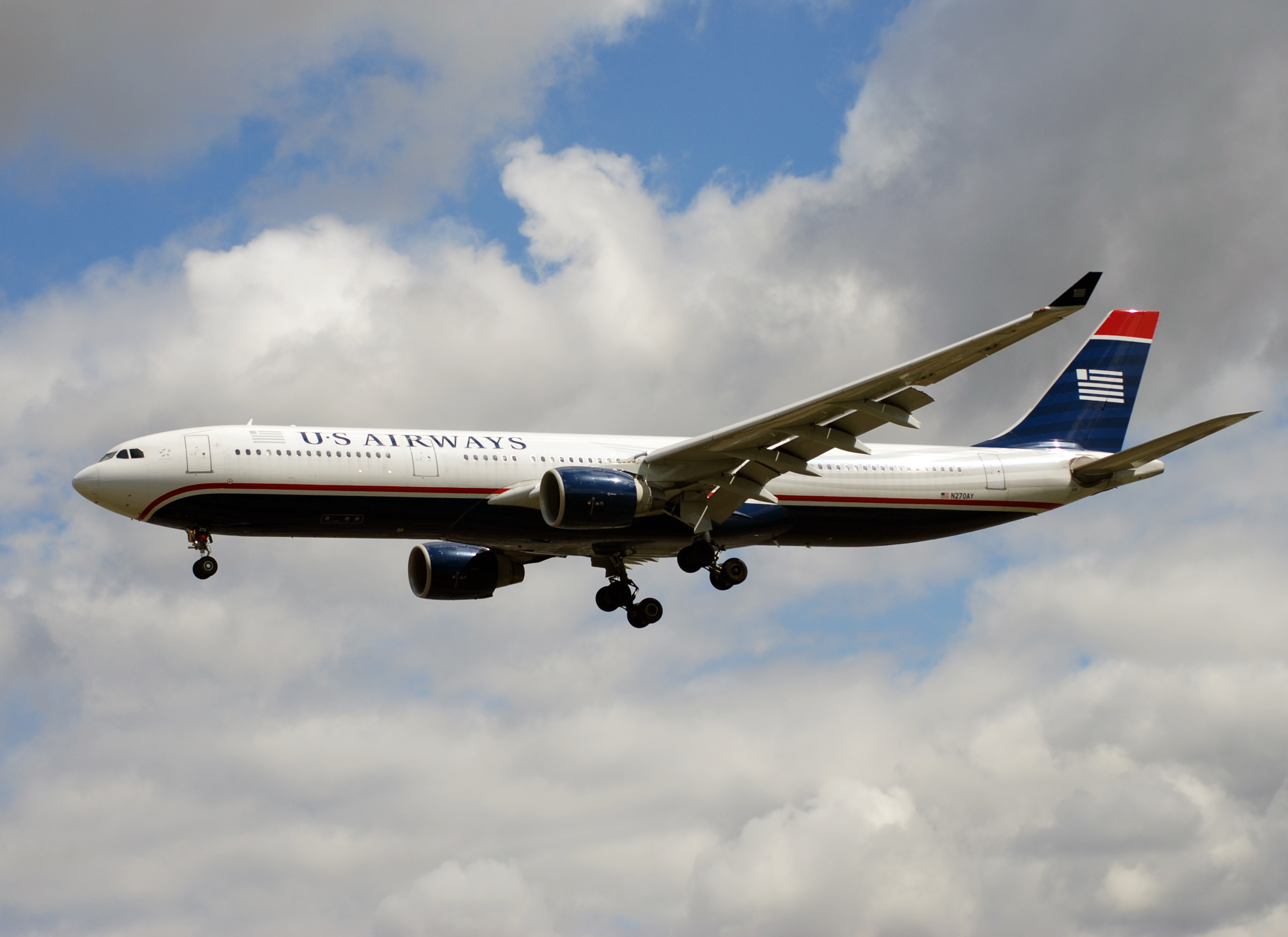
Airbus A330-300

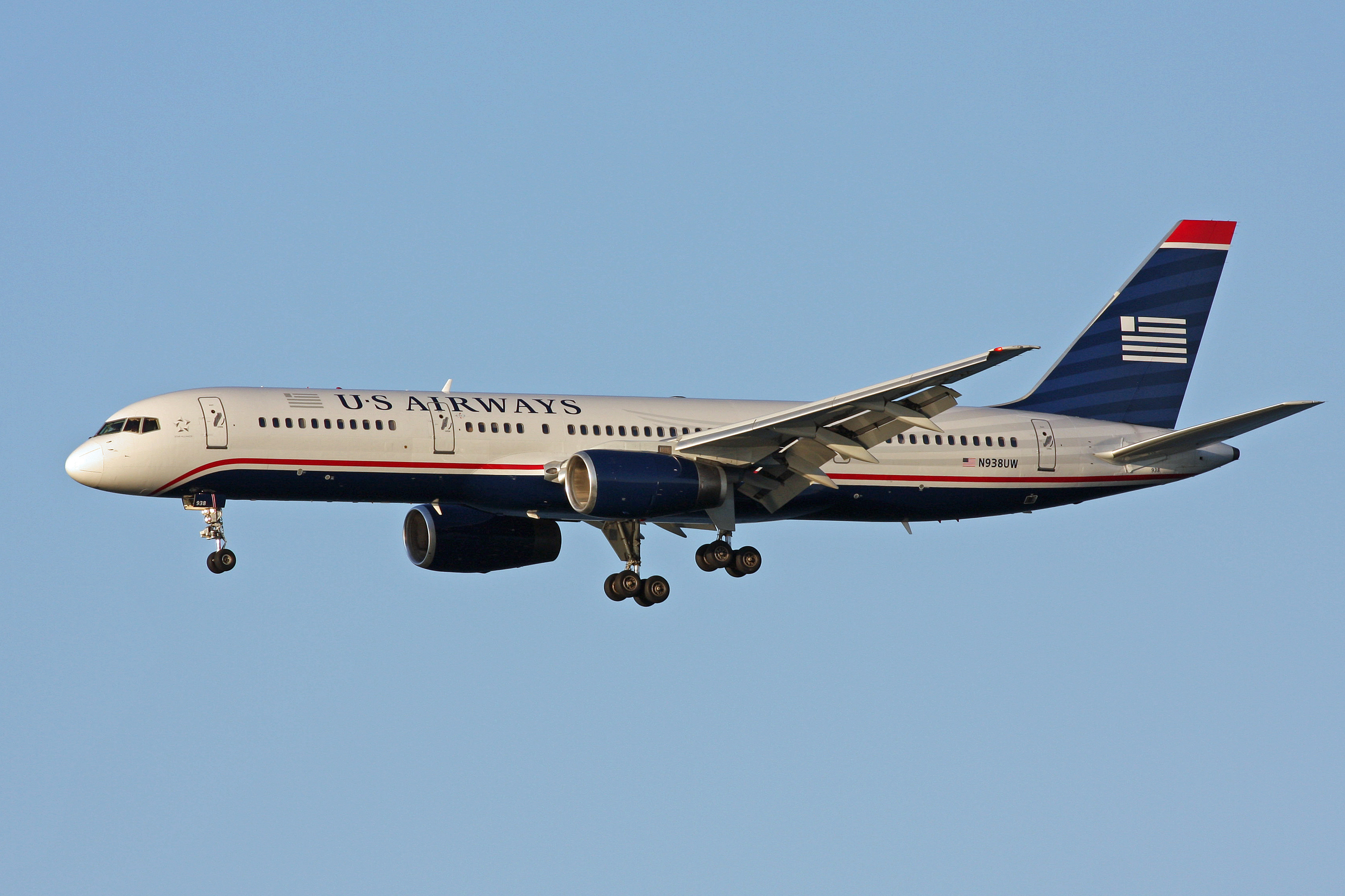
Boeing 757-200

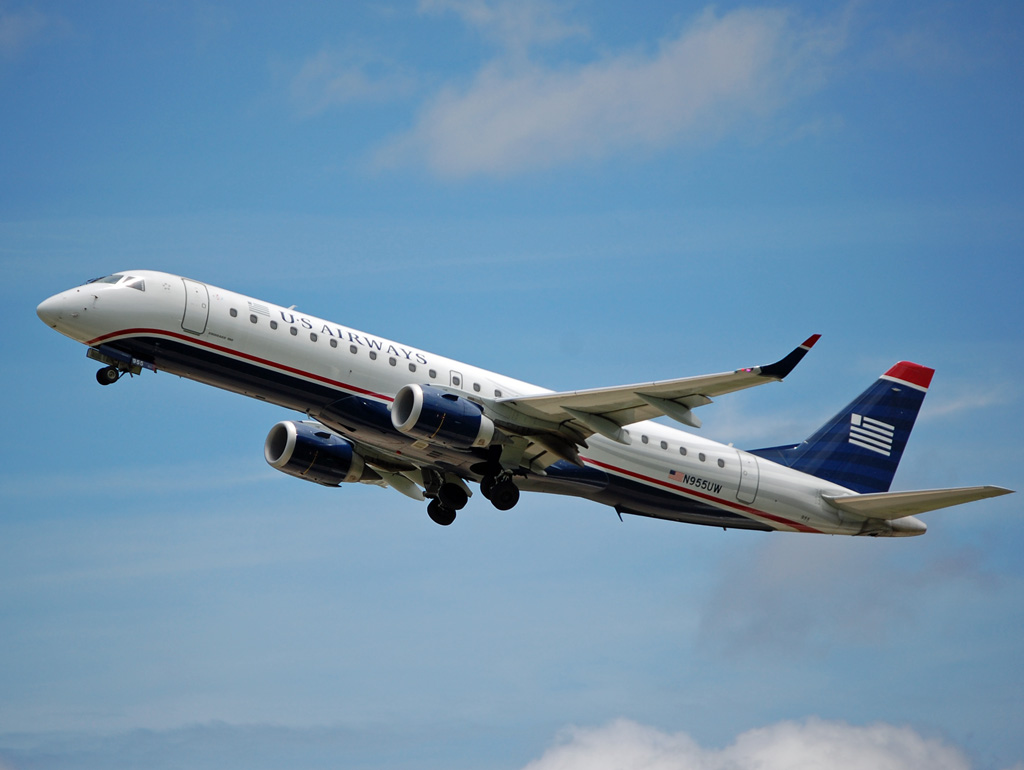
Embraer 190

As of December 9, 2013, at the time of the merger, US Airways' fleet consisted of the following aircraft:

US Airways fleet
Aircraft	In service	Orders	Passengers				Notes
Aircraft	In service	Orders	J	F	Y	Total	Notes
Airbus A319-100	93	—	—	12	112	124	All were transferred to American Airlines.
Airbus A320-200	60	—	—	12	138	150	All were transferred to American Airlines.
Airbus A321-200	90	31	—	16	171	187	All fleet and remaining deliveries transferred to American Airlines.
Airbus A330-200	11	4	20	—	238	258	All fleet and remaining deliveries transferred to American Airlines and later retired in 2020.
Airbus A330-300	9	—	28	—	263	291	All were transferred to American Airlines and later retired in 2020.
Airbus A350-900	—	22	N/A				Orders were transferred to American Airlines, but were later canceled when American ordered 47 additional Boeing 787 Dreamliners.
Boeing 737-400	14	—	—	12	132	144	All were transferred to American Airlines and later retired in 2014. Never flew under American brand name.
Boeing 757-200	9	—	—	14	176	190	All were transferred to American Airlines and later retired in 2020.
Boeing 757-200	15	—	12	—	164	176	All were transferred to American Airlines and later retired in 2020.
Boeing 767-200ER	10	—	18	—	186	204	All were transferred to American Airlines and later retired in 2015. Never flew under American brand name.
Embraer 190	20	—	—	11	88	99	All were transferred to American Airlines and later retired in 2020.
Total	331	57					

== Fleet history ==
US Airways previously operated the following aircraft:

US Airways retired fleet
Aircraft	Retired	Replacement	Notes
BAC One-Eleven	1989	Boeing 737 and US Airways Express fleet	Former Allegheny Airlines fleet.
BAe 146-100	1988	Boeing 737	Former Pacific Southwest Airlines fleet.
BAe 146-200	1991	Boeing 737	Former Pacific Southwest Airlines fleet.
Boeing 727-100	2000	Airbus A320 family and Boeing 737	Former Allegheny Airlines and Piedmont Airlines fleet.
Boeing 727-200	2000	Airbus A320 family	Former Allegheny Airlines and Piedmont Airlines fleet.
Boeing 737-200	2001	Airbus A320 family	
Boeing 737-300	2012	Airbus A320 family	Former America West Airlines and Piedmont Airlines fleet.
Douglas DC-3	1996	None	Piedmont Airlines retained one flyable DC-3 which USAir sold in 1996 to the Carolinas Aviation Museum.
Fokker F28 Fellowship	1997	US Airways Express fleet	Former Empire Airlines and Piedmont Airlines fleet.
Fokker 100	2002	Airbus A320 family	
McDonnell Douglas DC-9-31	2001	Airbus A320 family	Former Allegheny Airlines and Pacific Southwest Airlines fleet.
McDonnell Douglas MD-81	2002	Airbus A320 family	Former Pacific Southwest Airlines fleet.
McDonnell Douglas MD-82	2002	Airbus A320 family	Former Pacific Southwest Airlines fleet.

== See also ==
- US Airways livery
