= Ed Beauvais =

American airline industry executive (1936–2021)

Edward Raymond Beauvais
- Born: November 13, 1936; Pueblo, Colorado, US
- Died: September 28, 2021 (aged 84); Scottsdale, Arizona, US
- Known for: Co-founder of America West Airlines, Western Pacific Airlines, and Mountain Air Express
- Spouse: Mary Ellen Beauvais
- Children: 5

Edward Raymond Beauvais (November 13, 1936 – September 28, 2021) was a business executive known for his contributions to the US airline industry. In a career spanning over 40 years, he founded three airlines including America West Airlines, which later merged with American Airlines.

== Early life ==
Beauvais was born Edward Raymond Beauvais on November 13, 1936, in Pueblo, Colorado. His family had French-Canadian heritage and had moved to the Colorado city, where his grandfather and father both had worked at the Colorado Fuel and Iron steel mill. He went to Saint Joseph's College, Indiana, on a sports scholarship and later moved over to Regis University in Denver. He was a talented athlete who started out playing baseball as a left-handed pitcher and a right-handed batter and was even drafted by the Baltimore Orioles as he came out of high school. However, he went on to pick up football and became an offensive lineman.

== Career ==
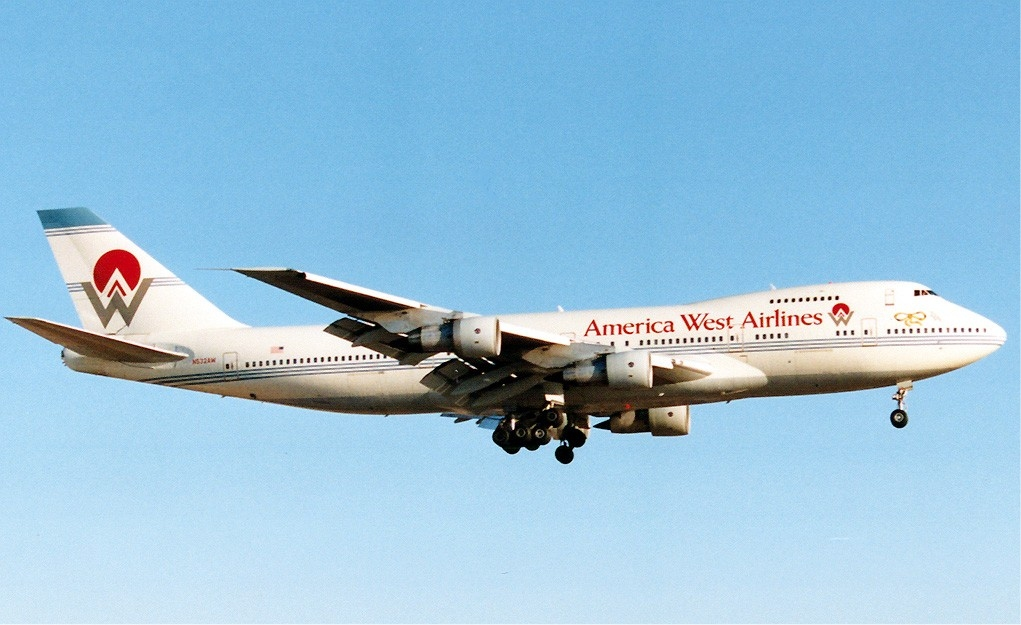
America West Airlines Boeing 747-200 in Phoenix, Arizona (1991)

In a career spanning over 40 years, Beauvais founded three airline carriers, including the Phoenix-based America West Airlines, which eventually acquired American Airlines. Some of his pioneering features have become mainstays for low-cost carriers. Beauvais started his career working in the accounts department at Colorado Fuel and Iron before joining Frontier Airlines finance department. He later moved to Bonanza Air Lines and Phoenix, Arizona, in 1966. He changed careers becoming a consultant in 1970, where he served clients including Continental Airlines and the City of Phoenix. This was the time when the airline industry was seeing deregulation in 1978. In 1981, he co-founded America West Airlines with his son Mark Beauvais, Don Neilson, and Michael Roach. Deregulation of the industry had spawned other airline startups, including New York Air and People Express Airlines, and launched intense price competition. In this environment, he started the company with $2 million in seed money and three rented Boeing jets. The company was often referred to as the "pearl of deregulation" or "darling of deregulation".

America West Airlines pioneered many low-cost features, reducing costs by having flight attendants double up as customer service representatives. The company also brought in the first of the industry's yield management systems that aimed to maximize revenues by creating fare segments. The company had the lowest cost-per-seat-mile in the industry and one of the best on-time records. The company enjoyed healthy relations with its employees and became the largest carrier in Phoenix, surpassing Southwest Airlines in its very first year. It grew its fleet to include jets flying outside the mainland to Hawaii and Japan. However, mounting costs and increasing fuel prices, including those stemming from the First Gulf War resulted in the company heading to bankruptcy court in 1992. At this time Beauvais stepped down from the company along with his son. The company then shaped airline industry consolidation in the US. It merged with US Airways adopting the US Airways brand name, and then merged with American Airlines to become what was as of 2021, the world's largest carrier.

After stepping down from America West in 1992, Beauvais started Western Pacific Airlines, based in Colorado, with his son Mark, and also started Mountain Air Express to serve the state's ski-tourism industry.

Beauvais was named Inc. magazine's Entrepreneur of the Year in 1989 and was inducted into the Arizona Aviation Hall of Fame in 2014.

== Personal life ==
Beauvais married Mary Ellen (née Talbow) in 1957. The couple had met in high school where he was a baseball pitcher. They had five children. Beauvais had a fraternal twin. He remained connected with athletics, coaching his sons' little league teams.

Beauvais died from a heart attack at home on September 28, 2021. He was 84.
