= America West Airlines =

Airline of the United States (1981–2007)

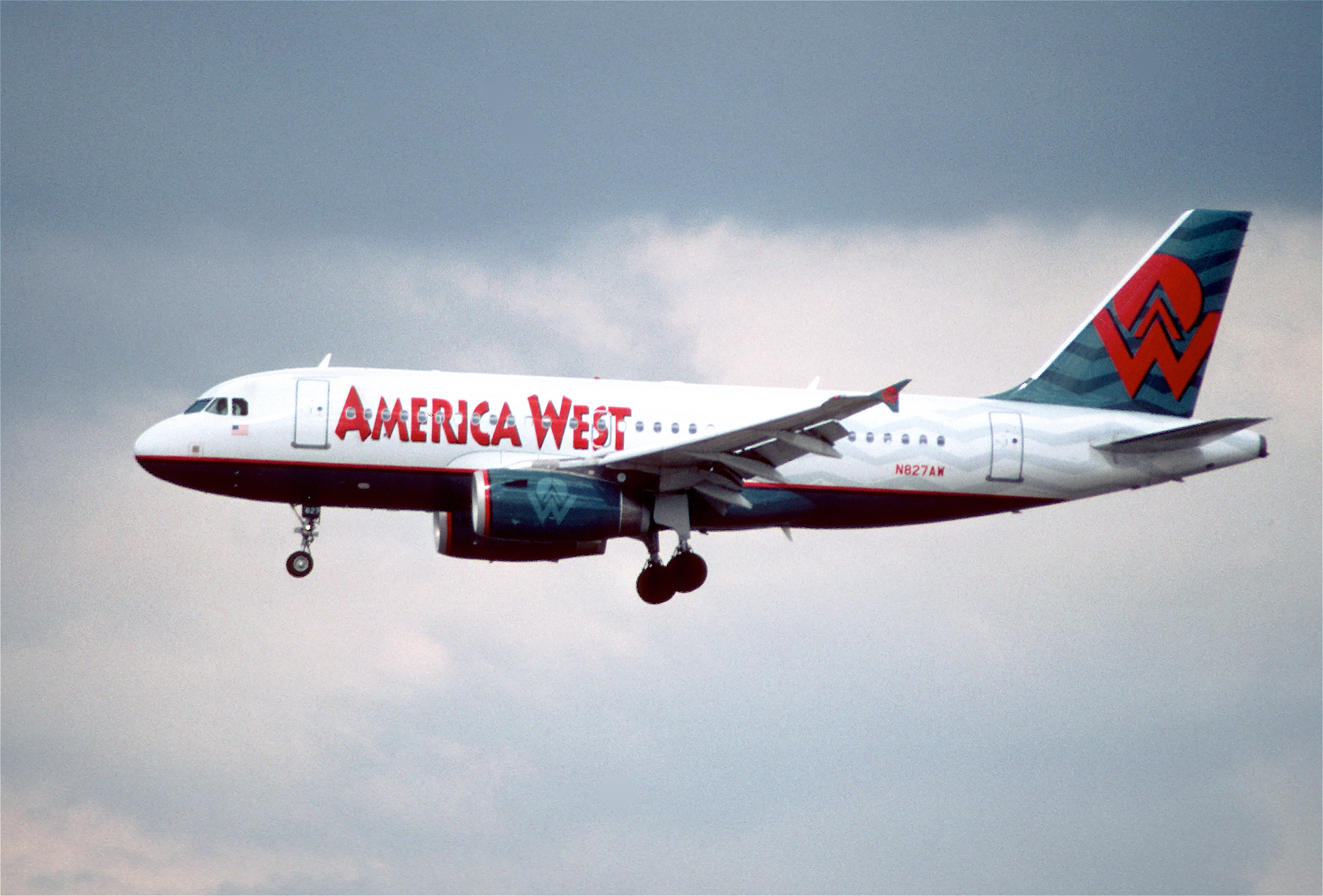
- An America West A319-100
IATA	ICAO	Call sign
HP	AWE	CACTUS
- Founded: February 1981
- Commenced operations: August 1, 1983
- Ceased operations: September 25, 2007 (merged into US Airways)
- Hubs: Phoenix–Sky Harbor
- Secondary hubs: Columbus–Glenn (1993–2003); Las Vegas
- Frequent-flyer program: FlightFund
- Subsidiaries: America West Express (1985–2007)
- Parent company: America West Holdings (1981–2005); US Airways Group (2005–2007)
- Headquarters: Tempe, Arizona, United States
- Key people: Bill Franke; Doug Parker
- Founders: Ed Beauvais (First CEO); Mark Beauvais; Don Neilson; Michael Roach

America West Airlines was an airline in the United States that operated from 1981 until it merged with US Airways in 2007. It was headquartered in Tempe, Arizona. Its main hub was at Phoenix Sky Harbor International Airport, with secondary hubs at Harry Reid International Airport in Las Vegas, Nevada and John Glenn Columbus International Airport in Columbus, Ohio. The airline merged with US Airways in 2005 and adopted US Airways as their brand name. America West served about 100 cities in the US, Canada, and Mexico; flights to Europe were on codeshare partners. In September 2005, the airline had 140 aircraft, with a single maintenance base at Phoenix Sky Harbor International Airport. Regional jet and turboprop flights were operated on a code sharing basis by Mesa Airlines and Chautauqua Airlines as America West Express.

Beginning in January 2006, all America West flights were branded as US Airways, along with most signage at airports and other printed material, though many flights were described as "operated by America West." Apart from two heritage aircraft, the only remaining America West branding on aircraft were found on some seat covers and bulkheads. The merged airline used America West's "CACTUS" callsign and ICAO code "AWE", but retained the US Airways name. As part of a merger between American Airlines and US Airways in February 2013, which led to American becoming the world's largest airline, the call sign and ICAO code name was later retired on April 8, 2015, when the FAA granted a single operating certificate for both US Airways and American Airlines. The US Airways brand continued until October 17, 2015, when it merged with American Airlines.

== History ==
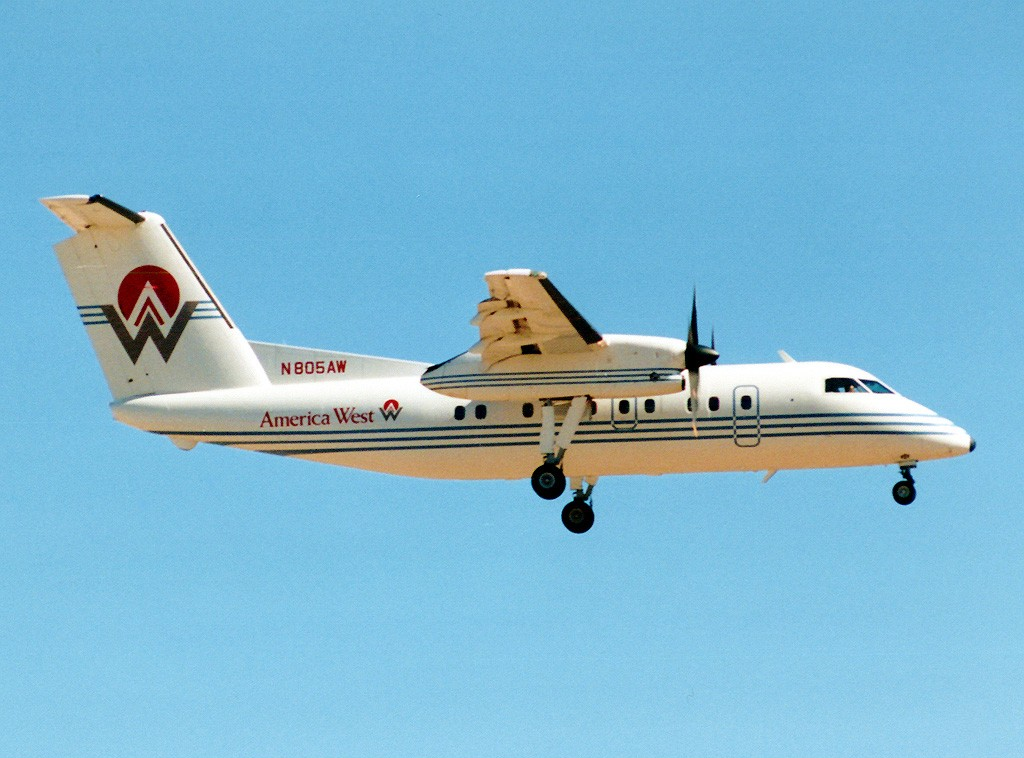
de Havilland Canada DHC-8 Dash 8 series 100 in 1991

The airline was established in February 1981 and began operations August 1, 1983, using three leased Boeing 737s flying out of its base in Phoenix, Arizona (PHX), with Ed Beauvais, a well-known airline industry consultant, as CEO. In the early years, passengers could purchase their tickets on the aircraft.

The airline quickly expanded, with 11 737s flying to 13 cities; in 1984, America West's fleet grew to 21 aircraft flying to 23 cities. The June 1984 timetable shows 71 weekday departures from Phoenix, non-stop to 18 cities; from 1985 to 1986, it established a second hub at Las Vegas.

Confident in its expansion, the increasingly-dominant carrier at Phoenix Sky Harbor influenced the development of Terminal 4. America West requested that the construction include an auxiliary power facility and an underground cavity to accommodate a future rail station, to which the airport ultimately agreed.

America West was one of the first airlines to use extensive "cross-utilization", in which employees were trained in a variety of airline jobs, such as pilots trained in dispatch, and both baggage handlers and flight attendants trained as gate agents. America West started as a "full-service" airline, in contrast with Southwest Airlines, a discount air carrier competing in many markets. America West used an aggressive employee stock-ownership program, in which new employees were required to invest 20% of their salary in company stock, providing a steady flow of cash as the company grew. America West pilots and other employees were paid wages far below those of competitors

Revenue Passenger-Kilometers, in millions
Year	Traffic
1984	2006
1985	3675
1990	17869
1995	21420
2000	30753
2005	39036

Former logo

By 1985 America West had outgrown their gate space at Phoenix Sky Harbor International Airport and during the construction of Terminal 4, approved in 1986, a temporary concourse was added to the southwest corner of Terminal 3 to give them six more gates (growing to eleven by 1990).

The airline's growth continued in 1986 and the airline expanded its fleet, mainly with Boeing 757-200s purchased from Northwest Airlines (following Northwest's acquisition of Republic Airlines) and a number of de Havilland Canada DHC-8 Dash 8s. (Unusually, the Dash 8 flights were not code-shares and Mesa code-shares replaced them in 1992–93.) The airline started red-eye flights from Las Vegas to improve aircraft utilization.

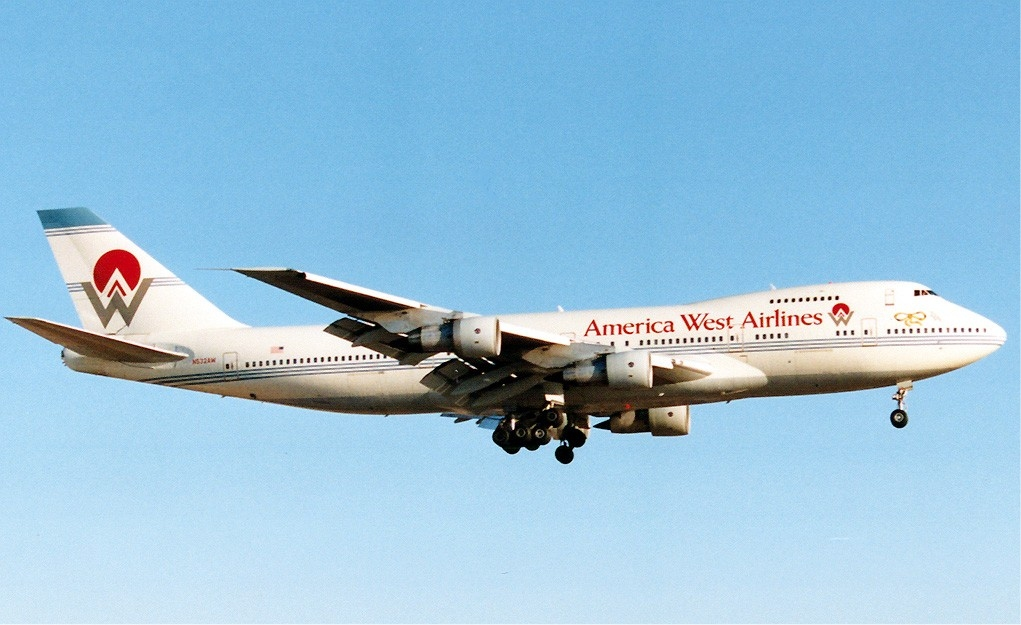
Boeing 747-200 at Phoenix Sky Harbor in 1991

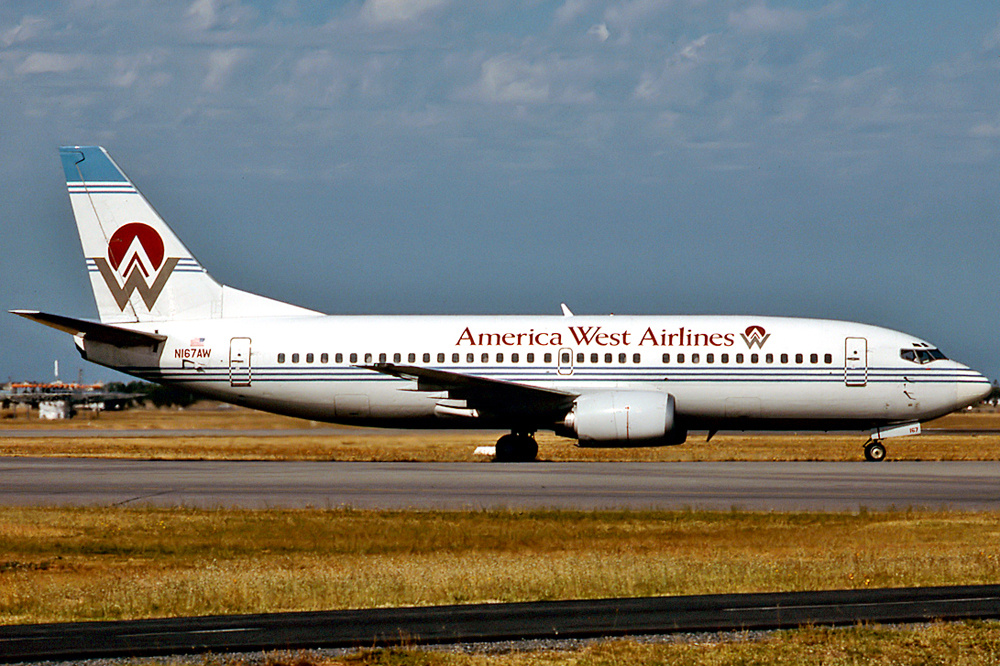
Boeing 737-300 at Adelaide Airport, Australia in 1989, during the Australian pilot's dispute

America West's rapid growth led to large losses and by 1986 the company was on the verge of bankruptcy. Originally slated to occupy the vast majority of the gates in Terminal 4, the airline had to reduce their commitment to the city of Phoenix to just 28 gates, with the growing Southwest Airlines agreeing to lease the remainder of Terminal 4.

In June 1987 Ansett Transport Industries purchased a 20% stake in America West, increasing it to 26% in April 1991.

In 1988, Patrick Thurston, Vice-President of Operations, Bob Russell, Chief of Pilots, and Carl Wobser, a captain, all pleaded guilty to multiple counts of narcotics trafficking.

Three America West Airlines aircraft operated services in Australia with Ansett Australia during the 1989 Australian pilots' dispute.

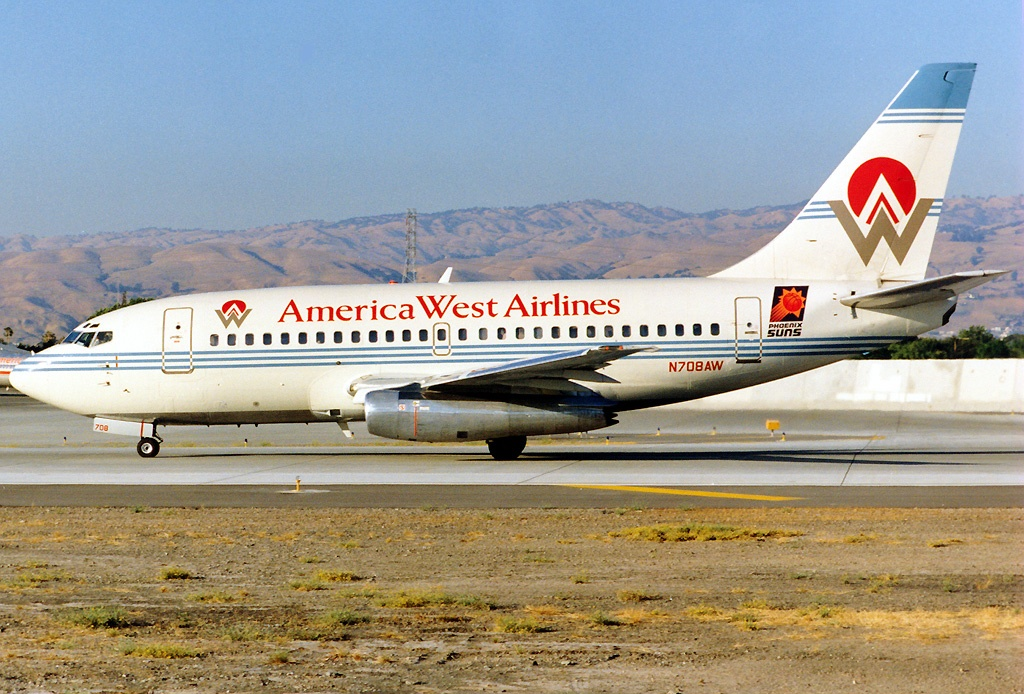
Boeing 737-112 at San Jose International Airport in 1993

As they explored destinations beyond the United States, America West filed with Department of Transportation for a Phoenix to Sydney route to connect with Ansett Airlines in Australia. The proposal was rejected and the Reagan Administration awarded the route to another airline. In 1989, America West leased four Boeing 747-200s (formerly operated by KLM) and began non-stop 747 flights between both Phoenix and Las Vegas to Honolulu, Hawaii, and non-stop between Honolulu and Nagoya, Japan. The 747 was the only wide-body aircraft America West used for long-haul flights. The airline also expanded narrow-body jet service to Mexican destinations.

In 1990, America West moved into the new Terminal 4 at Phoenix and took delivery of several Airbus A320s originally destined for now-defunct Braniff Airways. Braniff had purchased the order rights from Pan Am, another troubled carrier, and the A320s were sold to America West at a steep discount. Annual revenue reached a billion dollars, the threshold for the Department of Transportation to categorize America West as a major airline. The July 1990 timetable shows 182 weekday departures from Phoenix non-stop to 46 airports and 132 departures from Las Vegas to 39 airports. (24 LAS departures were between midnight and 01:40.)

The airline continued to lose money: operating expenses at Terminal 4 were far higher than in the temporary Terminal 3 concourse; the Nagoya route carried almost no passengers; tensions before the Gulf War caused fuel costs to rise. America West filed for bankruptcy in June 1991.

In June 1995, W. Douglas Parker joined America West as senior vice president and chief financial officer; he would be elected chairman, president and CEO in September 2001. The airline was fined $2.5 million for maintenance violations in July 1998, and in August 2000 the FAA was reportedly prepared to ground the airline for these violations.

=== Bankruptcy ===
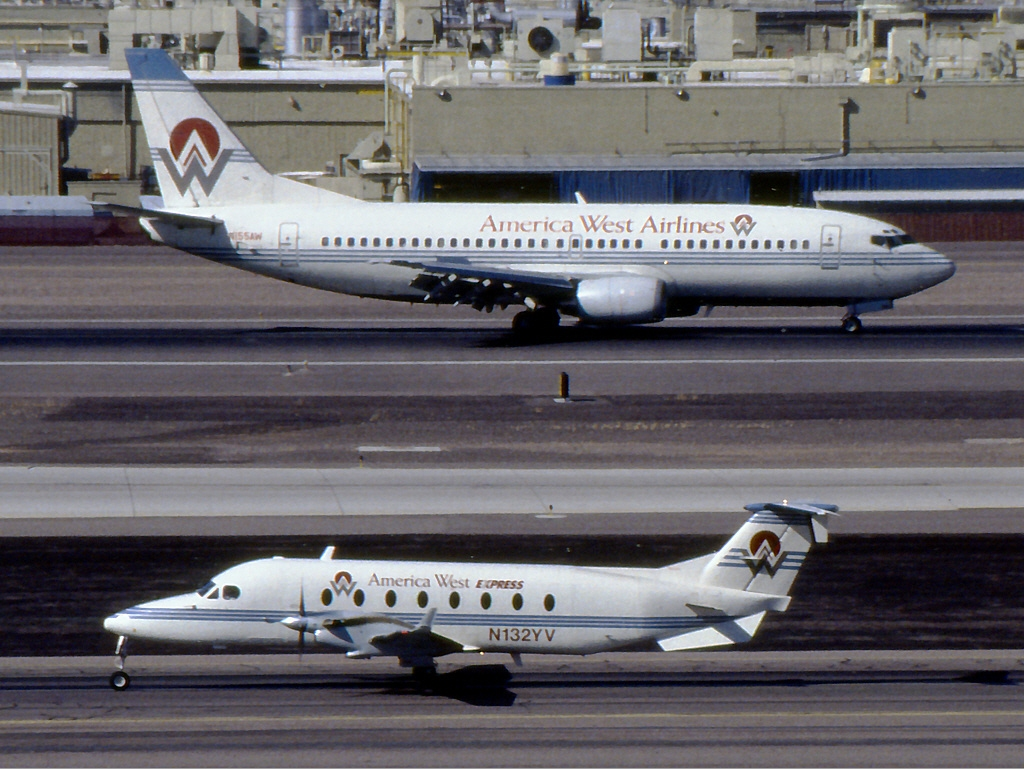
America West Boeing 737-300 and America West Express Beechcraft 1900D at Sky Harbor (1995)

America West operated under bankruptcy from 1991 to 1994; as part of the restructuring, employee stock became worthless, the airline's 747s and Dash8s were sold and the fleet was pared down to 87 aircraft. Hawaii and Nagoya routes were scrapped and America West feeder service to smaller cities and local markets was contracted to Mesa Airlines, which began flying turboprops and regional jets as America West Express.

On the management side, Founder Ed Beauvais was removed as CEO, remaining on the board of directors, and was replaced with Mike Conway, who had been with the airline since the start. Conway left the airline in 1994, replaced as CEO by A. Maurice Myers.

America West's flight attendants unionized in 1993, ending cross-utilization between customer service agents, flight attendants and ground agents. Several maintenance and training functions previously operated in-house by America West were outsourced during the bankruptcy.

=== Reorganization ===
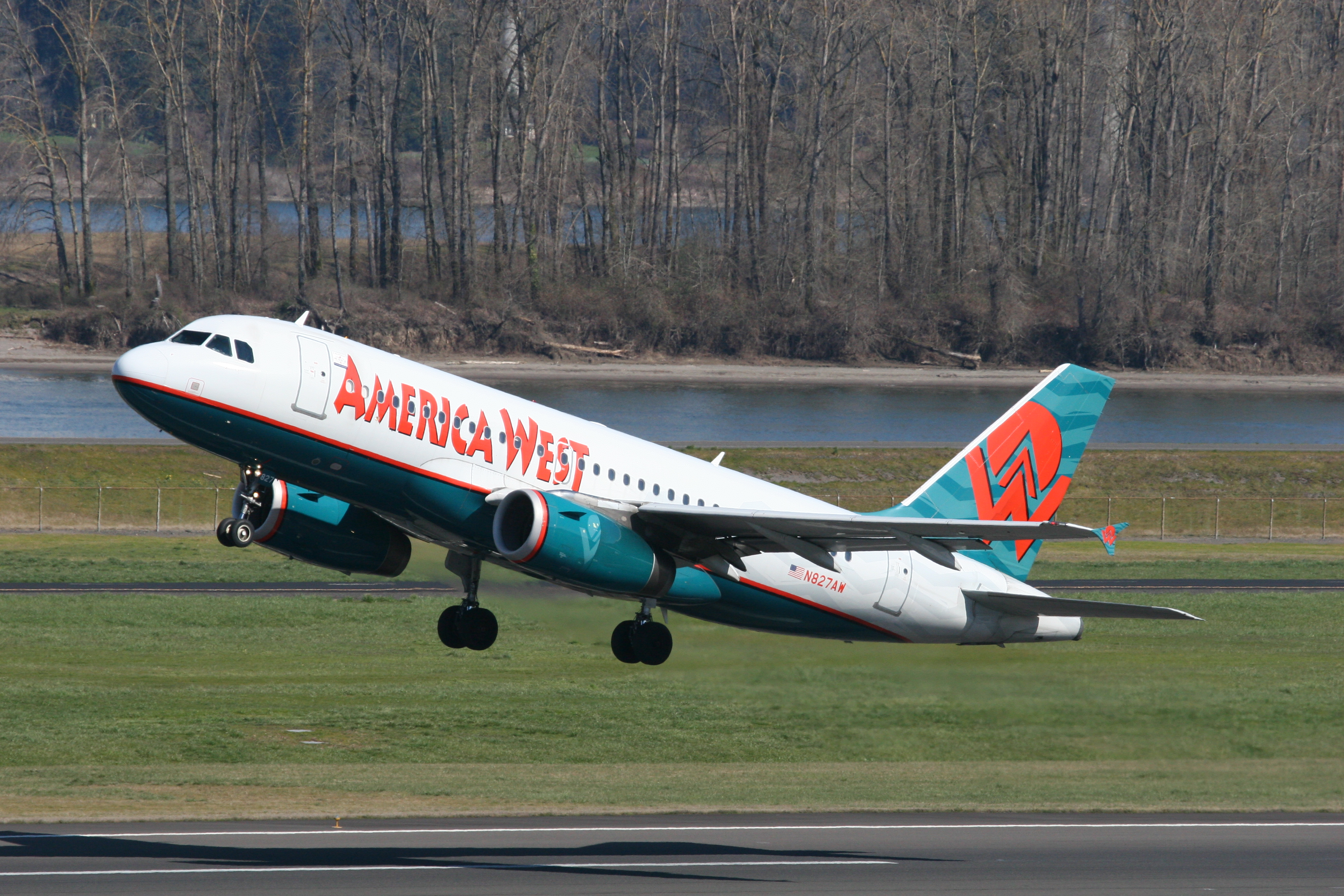
America West Airlines Airbus A319 departing Portland International Airport

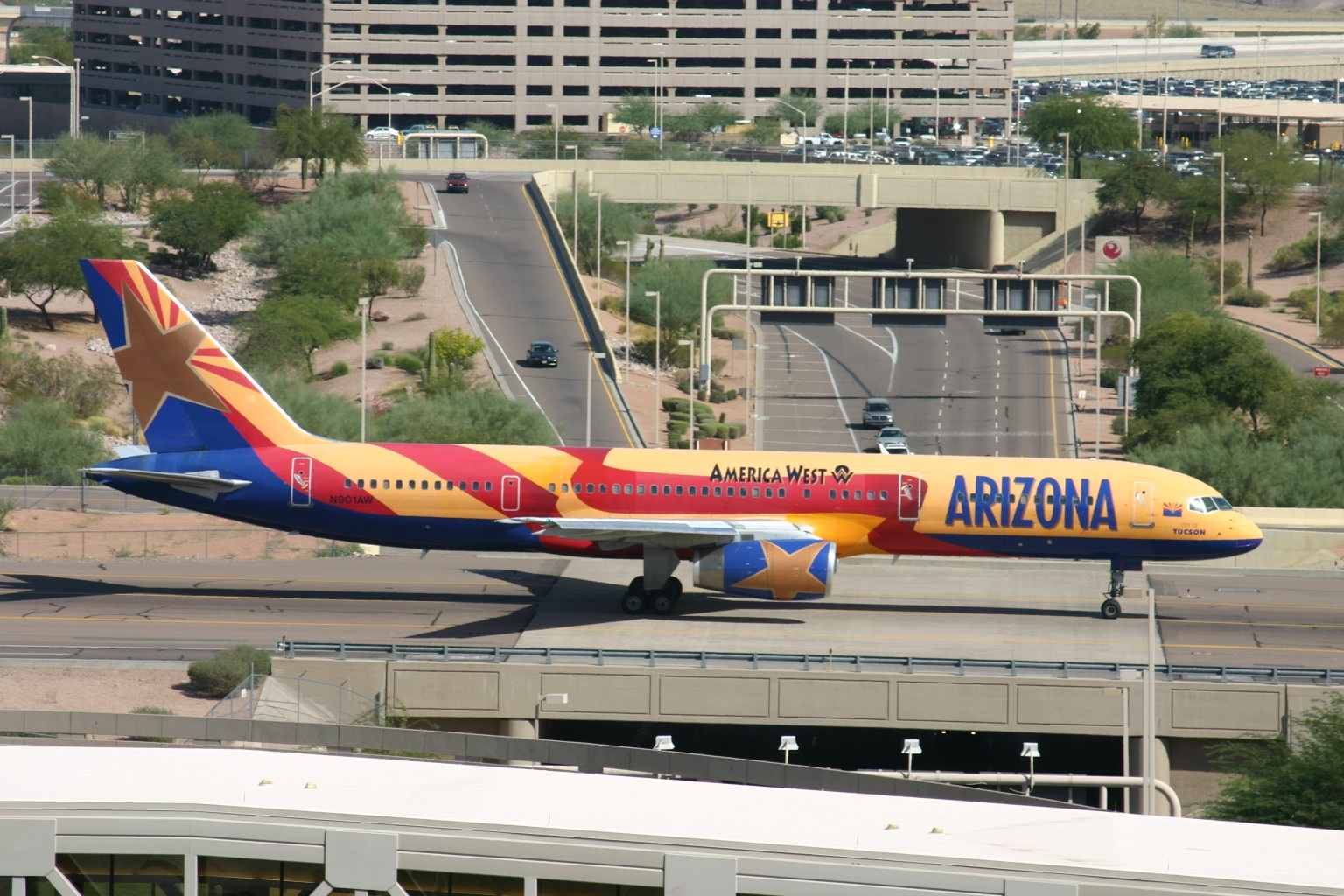
A Boeing 757 in "Arizona City of Tucson" special colors

In 1994, America West was finally able to secure a reorganization allowing it to come out of bankruptcy, with a large portion of the airline owned by a partnership including Mesa Airlines and Continental Airlines, resulting in code sharing agreements with these airlines.

To help reinvigorate the airline as they emerged from bankruptcy, a number of changes occurred, including a new color scheme and logo (used until the merger with US Airways), new livery, E-tickets, and online ticket purchasing in 1996. The airline continued ordering Airbus A320s and began gradually retiring their older Boeing 737-200s.

In 1993, America West opened a hub at Port Columbus International Airport in Columbus, Ohio, using Chautauqua Airlines and Mesa Airlines to provide commuter and regional flights via code sharing agreements in addition to mainline jets. An America West Club was at the hub in an area previously used for a TWA Ambassadors' Club.

In late 2001, America West was the first airline to apply for and receive a loan from the Air Transportation Stabilization Board. As of April 2005, the remaining balance on the loan was $300 million. The ATSB loan and its guarantees were paid back by US Airways and the debt refinanced by other lenders during the merger.

On May 1, 2002, America West ended its partnership with Continental Airlines, citing low code-shared flight sales.

In 2003, America West Airlines closed its Port Columbus hub, reducing scheduled daily flights from almost 50 to 4.

=== US Airways ===
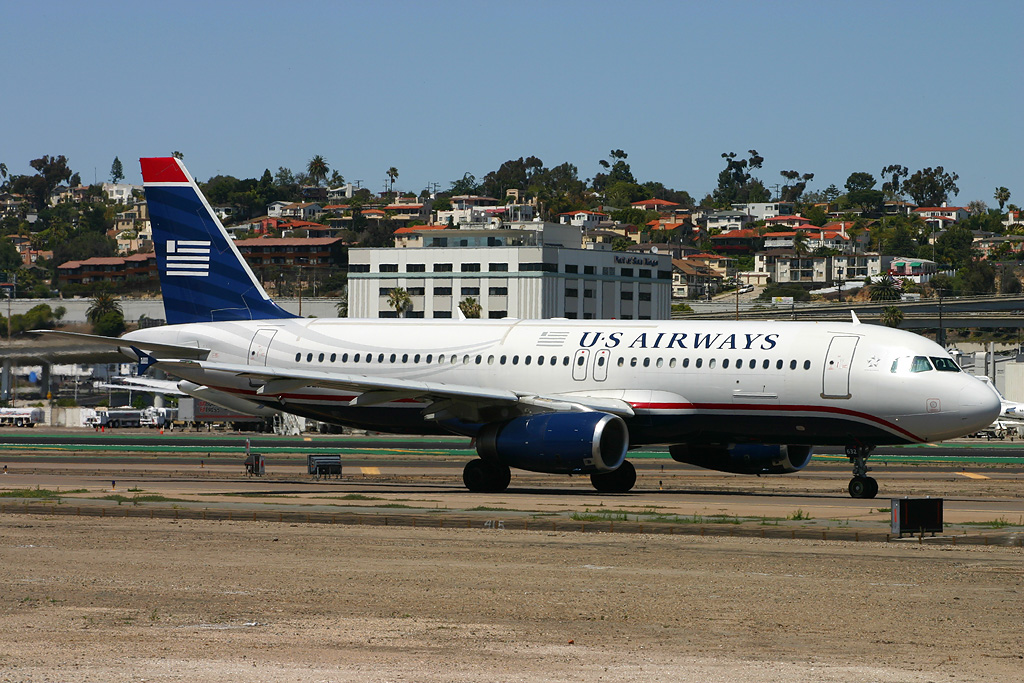
An Airbus A320 in the 2005-2015 America West / US Airways livery at San Diego International Airport

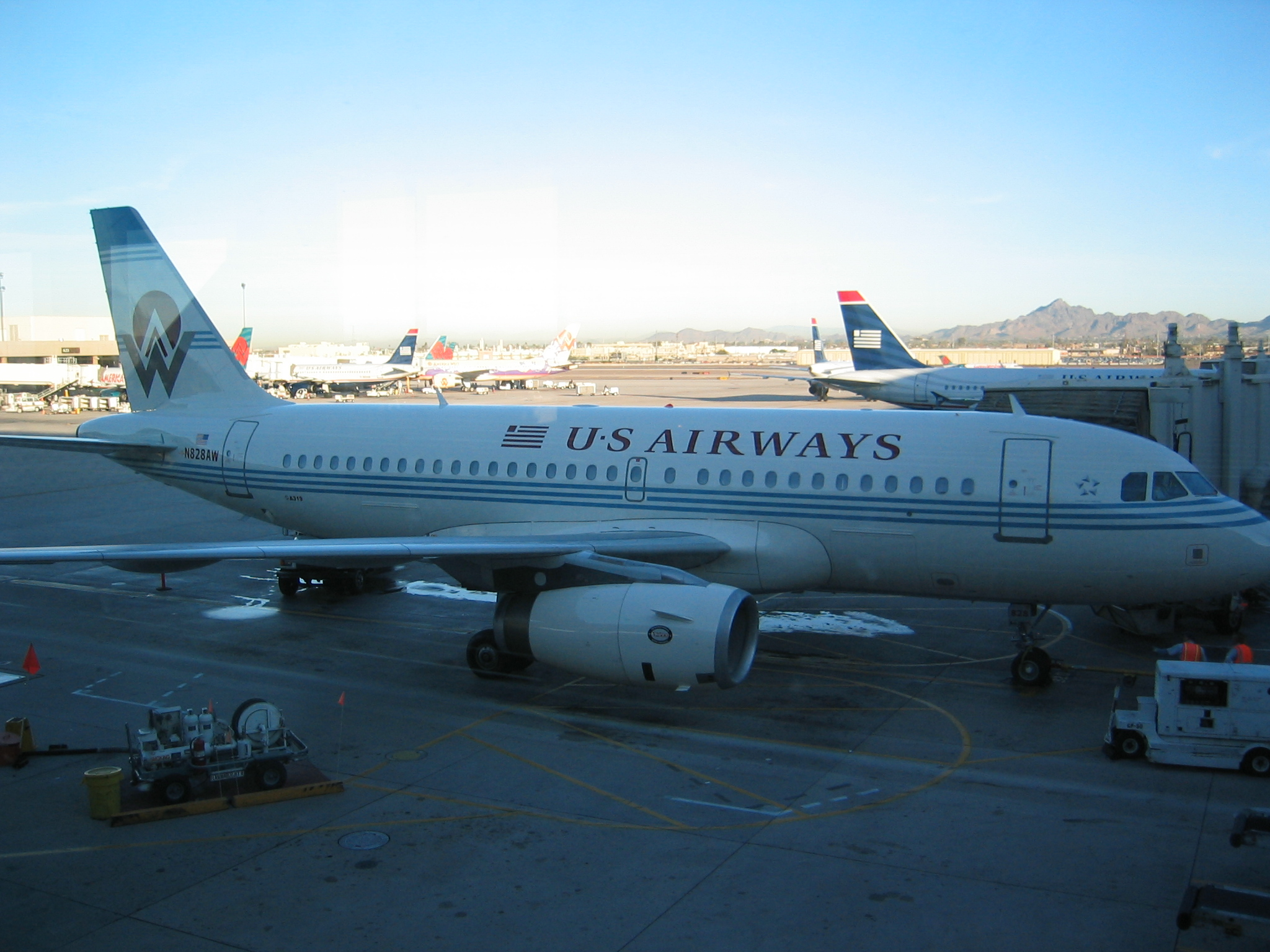
A US Airways Airbus A319 with America West livery at Phoenix Sky Harbor International Airport

In the second quarter of 2005, America West entered merger negotiations with then-bankrupt US Airways. It was structured as a purchase of US Airways by America West Holdings; however, the internal structure was a reverse merger, with legacy US Airways operations taken over by those of America West.

As the holding companies merged, brand conversion began. The America West Club was renamed the US Airways Club in October 2005. All-new America West aircraft were delivered in the new US Airways livery, and older aircraft repainted (while retaining America West interiors). Gates and ticket counters were consolidated at airports where both airlines had operated, aided by the March 2007 transfer of all US Airways reservations to the Shares computer system used by America West (US Airways had previously used a very different Sabre system).

All express flights were branded as US Airways Express and aircraft were no longer confined to operations out of their pre-merger hubs (America West aircraft could fly from Philadelphia to cities other than Phoenix and Las Vegas, for example). The two airlines' operating certificates were merged on September 25, 2007. After initially using the "CACTUS" callsign for the west fleet and "USAIR" for the east fleet, all aircraft began flying under a single "CACTUS" callsign and ICAO code "AWE" in September 2008. Meanwhile, US Airways abandoned Las Vegas as its hub. Former America West aircraft were distinguished apart from US Airways pre-merger aircraft by their use of registrations ending in "-AW", while pre-merger US Airways aircraft used registrations ending in "-US". US Airways would later merge with American Airlines in 2013, with the former America West callsign and ICAO code retired in 2015 (alongside with the US Airways brand). America West's Phoenix hub has remained intact with American Airlines.

== Fleet ==
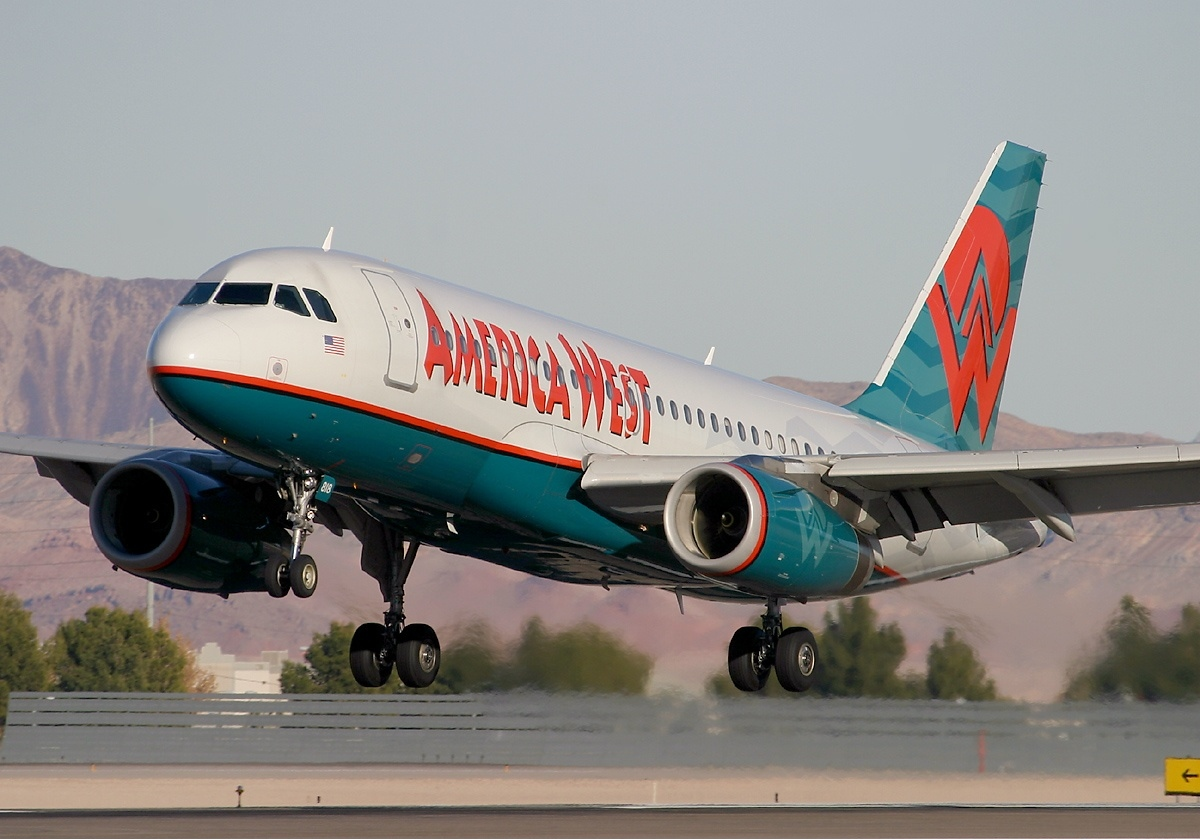
America West Airlines N818AW Airbus A319-132

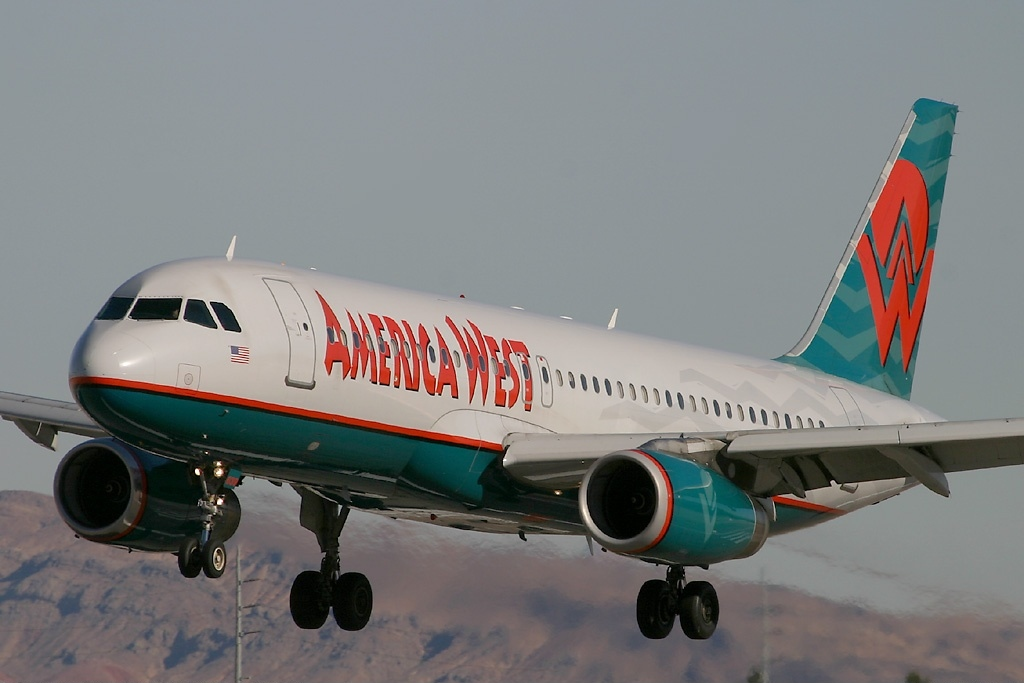
America West Airlines N639AW Airbus A320-232

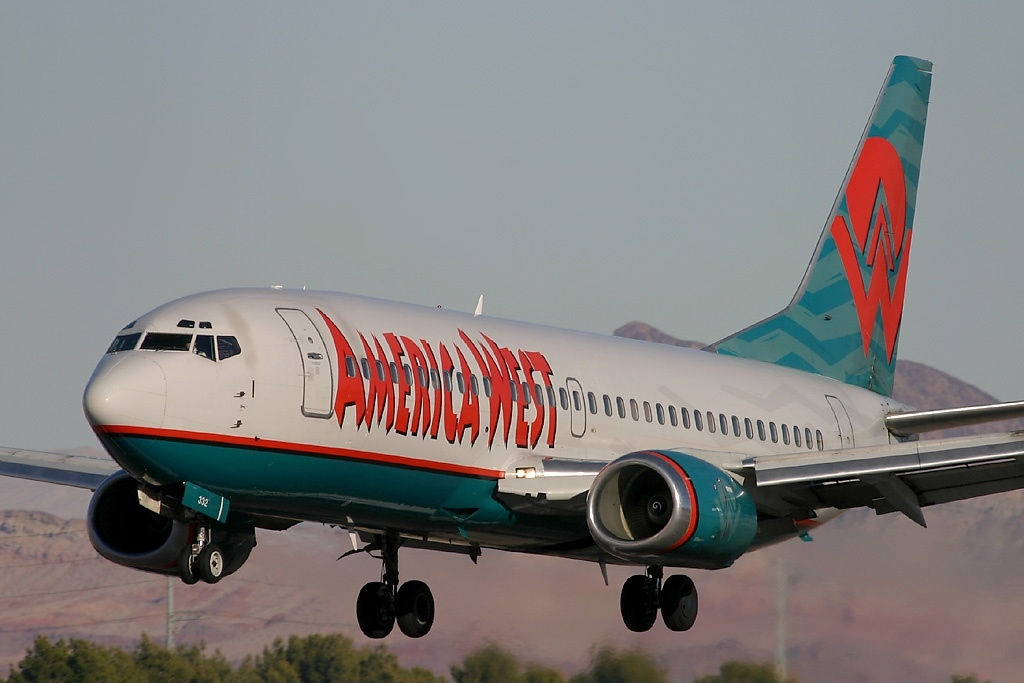
America West Airlines Boeing 737-300

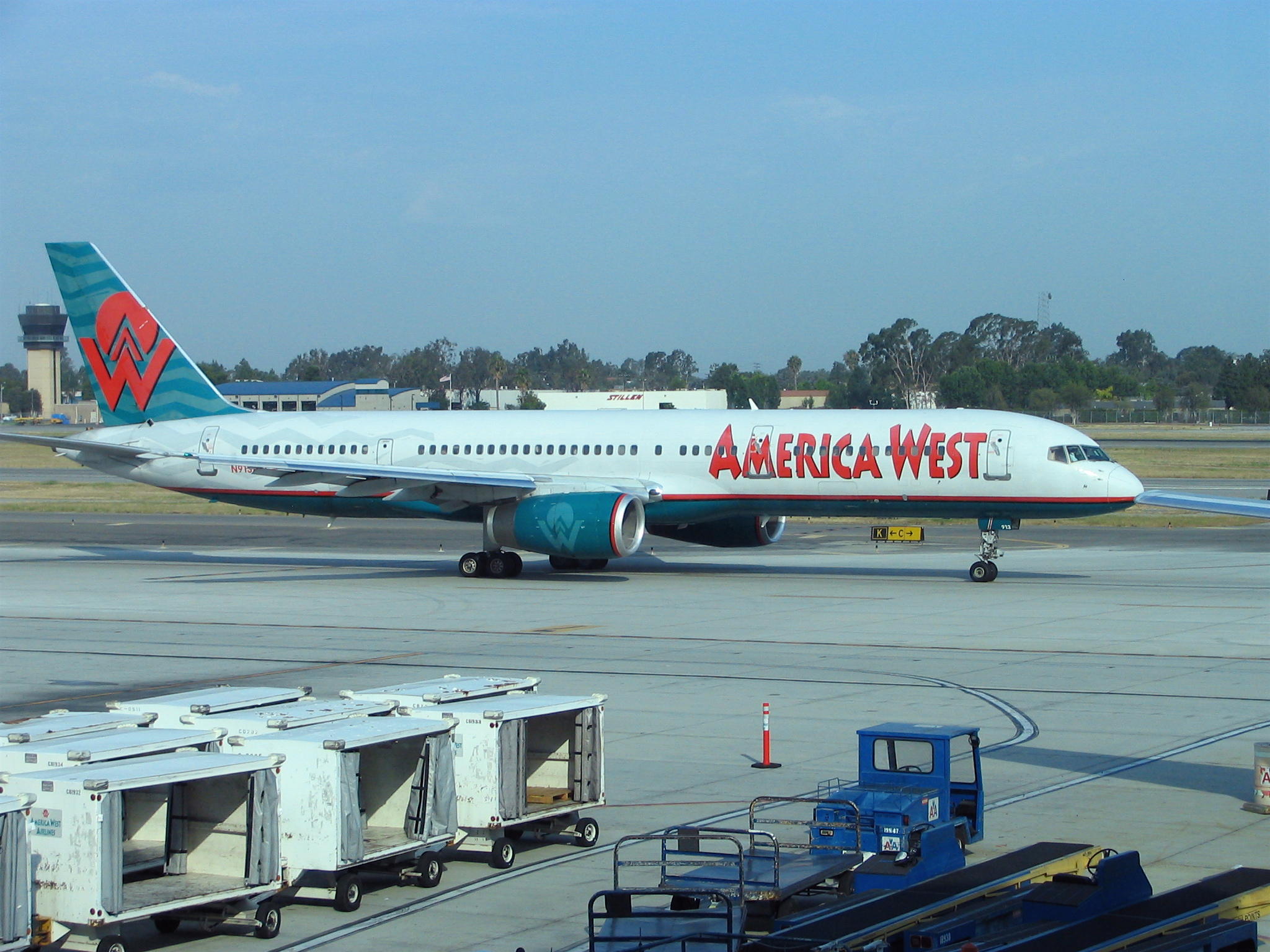
America West Airlines N913AW 757-225 in 2006

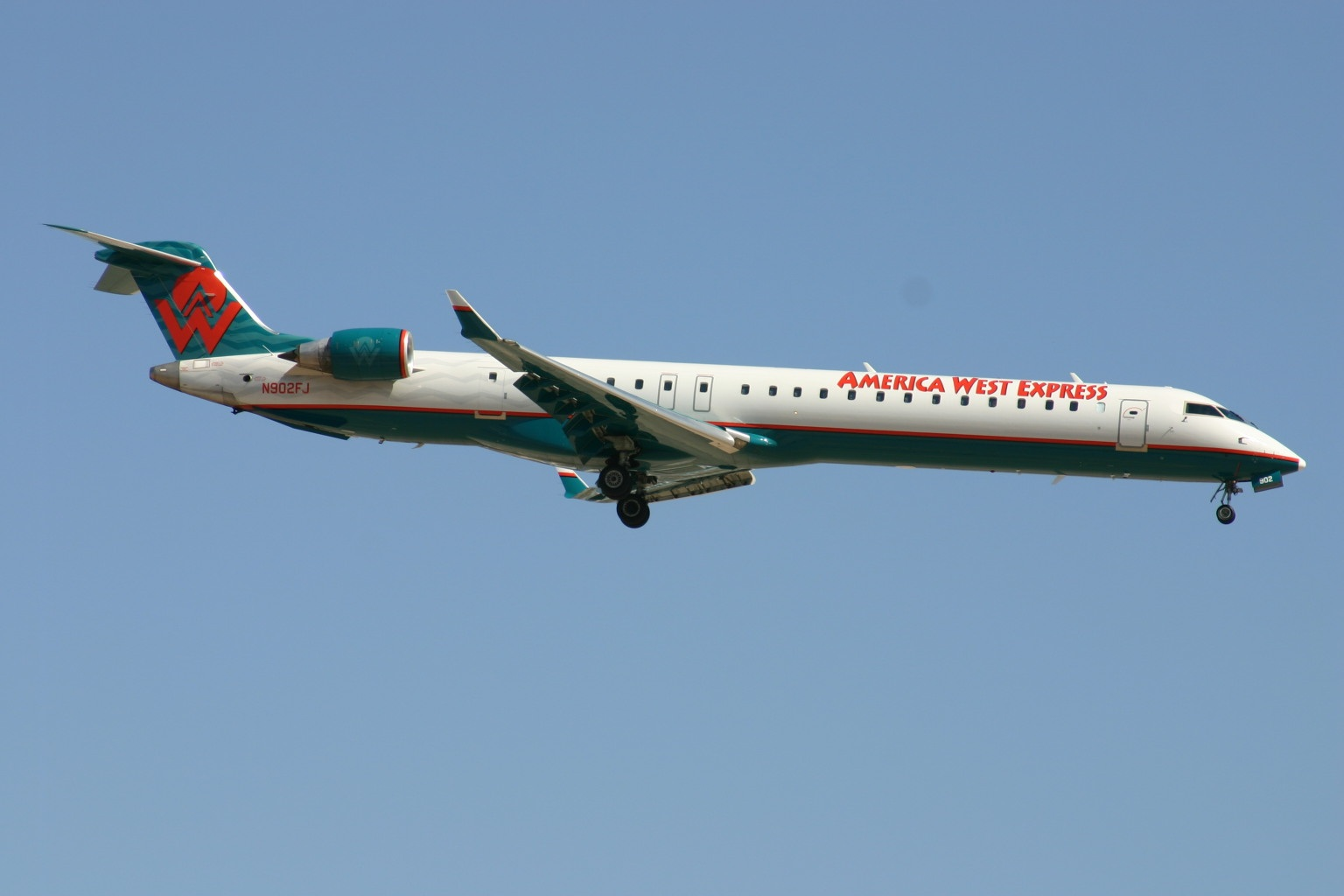
Canadair CRJ 900ER of Mesa Airlines in full America West Express livery

=== America West Express aircraft ===
America West Express services primarily operated by Mesa Airlines via a code sharing agreement with America West utilized the following regional jet and turboprop aircraft.

=== Canceled and planned orders ===
In 1991, America West had plans for purchasing 4 Boeing 747-400 aircraft to replace the aging 747-200s in Honolulu service, but an order of 10 further Boeing 757-200s was also mentioned. Furthermore, it was in the plans to purchase 15 Airbus A318s in the late 1990s aside with their new orders of A320s at the time but this never came to fruition. America West had also planned on announcing an order of 60 aircraft on September 12, 2001, but this was quickly retracted after the September 11th attacks.

== FlightFund ==
The airline had a frequent flyer program called FlightFund. In 2006, FlightFund was merged into the US Airways Dividend Miles program, which in turn merged into the American Airlines AAdvantage program in 2015.

== Destinations ==
The following is a list airports that America West Airlines flew to as of September 24, 2007 (at the time of merger with US Airways).

Country	City	Airport	Notes	Refs
Canada (Alberta)	Calgary	Calgary International Airport		
Canada (Alberta)	Edmonton	Edmonton International Airport		
Canada (British Columbia)	Vancouver	Vancouver International Airport		
Canada (British Columbia)	Cranbrook	Canadian Rockies International Airport	Charter	
Canada (Ontario)	Toronto	Toronto Pearson International Airport		
Costa Rica	San José	Juan Santamaría International Airport		
Japan	Nagoya (Note: According to the US Airways page, in 1991 as the United States entered the Gulf War, the Prime Minister of Japan told the Japanese people not to fly on United States airlines, thus causing a drop in traffic. America West then ceased flying Boeing 747 service the Nagoya-Honolulu route and sold the traffic rights to Northwest Airlines.)	Nagoya Airfield	Terminated	
Mexico (Baja California)	Los Cabos	Los Cabos International Airport		
Mexico (Colima)	Manzanillo	Playa de Oro International Airport	Seasonal	
Mexico (Federal District)	Mexico City	Mexico City International Airport		
Mexico (Guerrero)	Acapulco	Acapulco International Airport		
Mexico (Guerrero)	Ixtapa/Zihuatanejo	Ixtapa-Zihuatanejo International Airport	Seasonal	
Mexico (Jalisco)	Guadalajara	Guadalajara International Airport		
Mexico (Jalisco)	Puerto Vallarta	Licenciado Gustavo Díaz Ordaz International Airport		
Mexico (Nuevo León)	Monterrey	Monterrey International Airport	Terminated	
Mexico (Quintana Roo)	Cancún	Cancún International Airport		
Mexico (Sinaloa)	Mazatlán	Mazatlán International Airport		
Mexico (Sonora)	Guaymas	Guaymas International Airport		
Mexico (Sonora)	Hermosillo	Hermosillo International Airport		
United States (Alaska)	Anchorage	Ted Stevens Anchorage International Airport		
United States (Arizona)	Grand Canyon National Park	Grand Canyon National Park Airport	Terminated	
United States (Arizona)	Flagstaff	Flagstaff Pulliam Airport	Terminated	
United States (Arizona)	Phoenix	Phoenix Sky Harbor International Airport	Hub	
United States (Arizona)	Tucson	Tucson International Airport		
United States (Arizona)	Yuma	Yuma International Airport	Terminated	
United States (California)	Burbank	Hollywood Burbank Airport		
United States (California)	Carlsbad	McClellan–Palomar Airport		
United States (California)	Fresno	Fresno Yosemite International Airport		
United States (California)	Long Beach	Long Beach Airport		
United States (California)	Los Angeles	Los Angeles International Airport		
United States (California)	Oakland	Oakland International Airport		
United States (California)	Ontario	Ontario International Airport		
United States (California)	Palm Springs	Palm Springs International Airport		
United States (California)	Palmdale	Palmdale Regional Airport	Terminated	
United States (California)	Sacramento	Sacramento International Airport		
United States (California)	San Diego	San Diego International Airport		
United States (California)	San Francisco	San Francisco International Airport		
United States (California)	San Jose	San Jose Mineta International Airport		
United States (California)	San Luis Obispo	San Luis Obispo County Regional Airport		
United States (California)	Santa Ana	John Wayne Airport		
United States (California)	Santa Barbara	Santa Barbara Municipal Airport		
United States (Colorado)	Colorado Springs	Colorado Springs Airport		
United States (Colorado)	Denver	Denver International Airport		
United States (Colorado)	Denver	Stapleton International Airport	Airport Closed	
United States (Colorado)	Durango	Durango-La Plata County Airport		
United States (Colorado)	Eagle/Vail	Eagle County Regional Airport	Terminated	
United States (Colorado)	Grand Junction	Grand Junction Regional Airport		
United States (Colorado)	Hayden/Steamboat Springs	Yampa Valley Airport	Terminated	
United States (Colorado)	Montrose	Montrose Regional Airport	Terminated	
United States (Colorado)	Pueblo	Pueblo Memorial Airport	Terminated	
United States (Connecticut)	Hartford	Bradley International Airport		
United States (Florida)	Fort Lauderdale	Fort Lauderdale-Hollywood International Airport		
United States (Florida)	Fort Myers	Southwest Florida International Airport^{Seasonal}	Terminated	
United States (Florida)	Miami	Miami International Airport		
United States (Florida)	Orlando	Orlando International Airport		
United States (Florida)	Tampa	Tampa International Airport		
United States (Florida)	West Palm Beach	Palm Beach International Airport		
United States (Georgia)	Atlanta	Hartsfield-Jackson Atlanta International Airport		
United States (Hawaii)	Honolulu	Daniel K. Inouye International Airport		
United States (Idaho)	Boise	Boise Airport		
United States (Idaho)	Sun Valley (Note: America West was the only airline ever to serve Sun Valley with Boeing 737 jet aircraft.)	Friedman Memorial Airport	Terminated	
United States (Illinois)	Chicago	Midway International Airport	Terminated	
United States (Illinois)	Chicago	O'Hare International Airport		
United States (Illinois)	Moline	Quad Cities International Airport	Terminated	
United States (Indiana)	Indianapolis	Indianapolis International Airport		
United States (Iowa)	Cedar Rapids	The Eastern Iowa Airport	Terminated	
United States (Iowa)	Des Moines	Des Moines International Airport	Terminated	
United States (Iowa)	Sioux City	Sioux Gateway Airport	Terminated	
United States (Kansas)	Wichita	Wichita Dwight D. Eisenhower National Airport	Terminated	
United States (Louisiana)	New Orleans (Note: Service was abruptly halted in the aftermath of Hurricane Katrina in August 2005 and the Phoenix-New Orleans route never resumed following the merger with US Airways.)	Louis Armstrong New Orleans International Airport	Terminated	
United States (Maryland)	Baltimore	Baltimore/Washington International Thurgood Marshall Airport		
United States (Massachusetts)	Boston	Logan International Airport		
United States (Michigan)	Detroit	Detroit Metropolitan Wayne County Airport		
United States (Minnesota)	Minneapolis/Saint Paul	Minneapolis-Saint Paul International Airport		
United States (Missouri)	Kansas City	Kansas City International Airport		
United States (Missouri)	Springfield	Springfield–Branson National Airport	Terminated	
United States (Missouri)	St. Louis	St. Louis Lambert International Airport		
United States (Montana)	Kalispell	Glacier Park International Airport		
United States (Nebraska)	Lincoln	Lincoln Municipal Airport	Terminated	
United States (Nebraska)	Omaha	Eppley Airfield		
United States (Nevada)	Las Vegas	McCarran International Airport	Hub	
United States (Nevada)	Reno	Reno–Tahoe International Airport		
United States (New Jersey)	Newark	Newark Liberty International Airport		
United States (New Mexico)	Albuquerque	Albuquerque International Sunport		
United States (New York)	New York City	John F. Kennedy International Airport		
United States (New York)	New York City	LaGuardia Airport	Terminated	
United States (North Carolina)	Raleigh/Durham	Raleigh–Durham International Airport		
United States (Ohio)	Cleveland	Cleveland Hopkins International Airport		
United States (Ohio)	Columbus	John Glenn Columbus International Airport	Hub	
United States (Oklahoma)	Oklahoma City	Will Rogers World Airport		
United States (Oregon)	Portland	Portland International Airport		
United States (Pennsylvania)	Philadelphia	Philadelphia International Airport		
United States (Pennsylvania)	Pittsburgh	Pittsburgh International Airport		
United States (Tennessee)	Memphis	Memphis International Airport		
United States (Texas)	Austin	Austin–Bergstrom International Airport		
United States (Texas)	Dallas/Fort Worth	Dallas Fort Worth International Airport		
United States (Texas)	El Paso	El Paso International Airport		
United States (Texas)	Houston	George Bush Intercontinental Airport		
United States (Texas)	Lubbock	Lubbock Preston Smith International Airport	Terminated	
United States (Texas)	Midland/Odessa	Midland International Air and Space Port	Terminated	
United States (Texas)	San Antonio	San Antonio International Airport		
United States (Utah)	Salt Lake City	Salt Lake City International Airport		
United States (Virginia)	Washington, D.C. area	Dulles International Airport		
United States (Virginia)	Washington, D.C. area	Ronald Reagan Washington National Airport		
United States (Washington)	Seattle/Tacoma	Seattle–Tacoma International Airport		
United States (Washington)	Spokane	Spokane International Airport		
United States (Wisconsin)	Milwaukee	Milwaukee Mitchell International Airport		

== Codeshare agreements ==
Throughout its existence, America West had codeshare agreements with the following airlines:

- Big Sky Airlines
- British Airways
- Chautauqua Airlines (operating as America West Express' regional jet feeder service at the former Columbus hub)
- Continental Airlines (ended on May 1, 2002, citing low code-shared flight sales)
- EVA Air
- Hawaiian Airlines (on services to Kahului, Kailua-Kona, and Lihue)
- Mesa Airlines (operating as America West Express' regional jet and turboprop feeder service at America West hubs)
- Northwest Airlines (codeshared on flights from Asia)
- Qantas (ended February 28, 2007)
- Royal Jordanian Airlines
- Trans World Airlines
- US Airways (Merger partner)
- Virgin Atlantic

== Headquarters ==
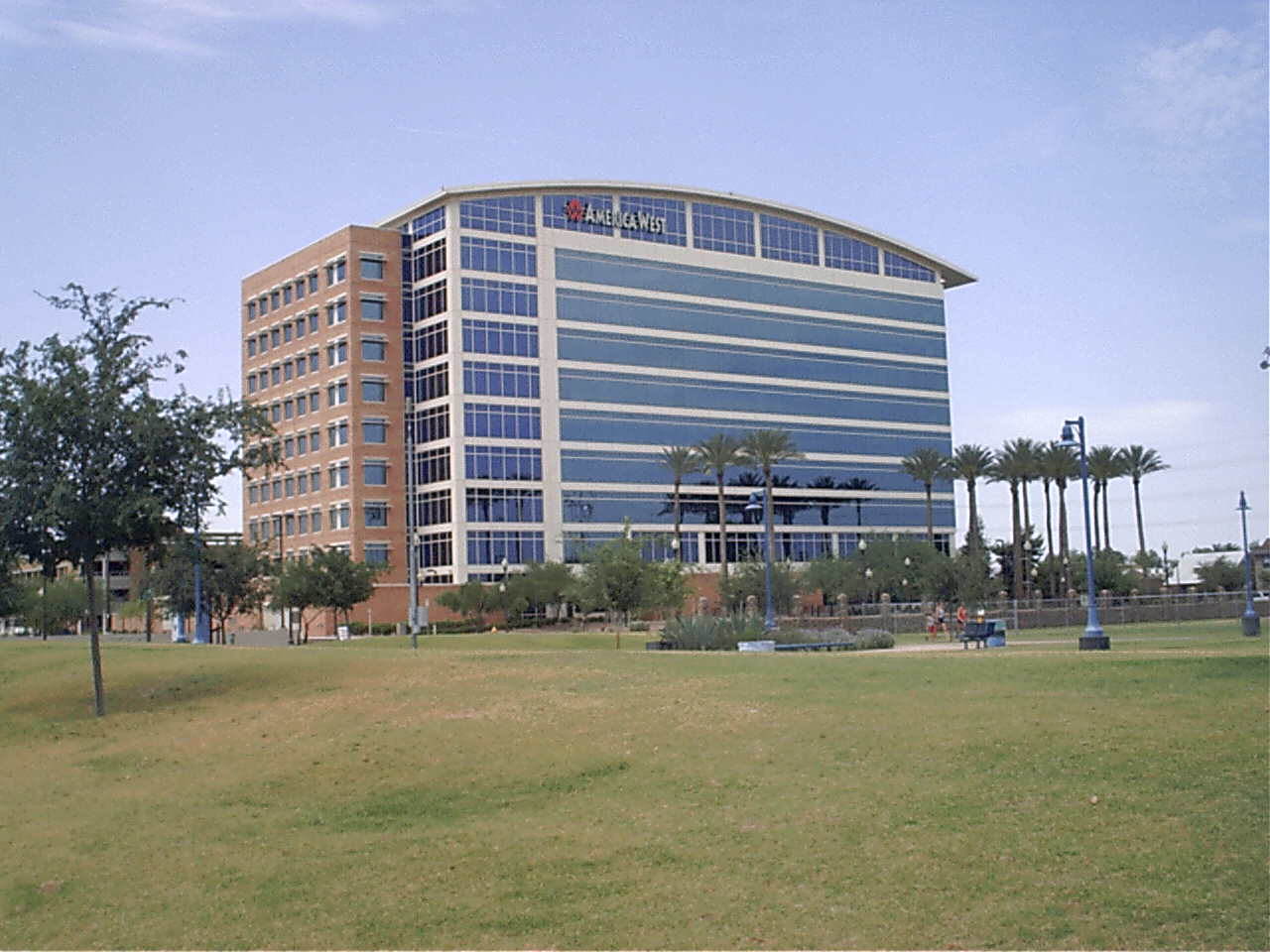
The headquarters of America West Airlines in Tempe, which also served as the headquarters for US Airways post-acquisition

America West had its headquarters in Tempe, Arizona from the airline's start in 1983 and it retained the same location when it merged with US Airways and retained the US Airways name. The airline used the nine-story 225,000-square-foot (20,900 m^{2}) building as its headquarters once America West and US Airways merged, but the building has since been vacated when US Airways' management team took over American Airlines in an acquisition. Jahna Berry of the Arizona Business Gazette said in 2005 that the building "is one of the dominant buildings in downtown Tempe." The City of Tempe gave America West $11 million in incentives and tax breaks so it could occupy the headquarters, which cost $37 million to construct. The construction of the building began in January 1998; the groundbreaking ceremony was held on February 19 of that year. The previous America West headquarters were demolished.

== Other commercial interests ==
America West had promotional partnerships with the Phoenix Suns NBA team, the 2001 World Series champion Arizona Diamondbacks baseball team, and the Arizona Cardinals NFL team.

In 1992, America West paid $26 million for the 30-year naming rights of the Phoenix Suns' home court, which it named America West Arena. Since the merger with US Airways, the arena was called US Airways Center (not to be confused with the USAir Arena in Prince George's County, Maryland, razed in 2002), until it was renamed to Talking Stick Resort arena.

== Accidents and incidents ==
America West had four in-flight incidents on its aircraft, but never had an accident resulting in a fatality. Two accidents resulted in hull loss write-offs.

Flight	Date	Aircraft	Location	Descriptions	Injuries
America West Airlines Flight 450	December 30, 1989	737-200	Tucson, Arizona	A fire in the wheel well burned through hydraulic conduit; consequently, during landing, braking was ineffective and the aircraft overran the end of the runway. After colliding with a concrete structure, the plane came to a stop. The aircraft was written off. NTSB probable cause	10 minor
America West Airlines Flight 727	January 16, 1990	737-300	Austin, Texas	On January 16, 1990, America West Flight 727 was hijacked en route to Las Vegas from Houston. The hijacker forced the pilot to land the aircraft in Austin, Texas, so it could be refueled and flown to Cuba. Austin police overpowered and arrested the hijacker.	none
America West Airlines Flight 556	July 1, 2002	A319-100	Miami, Florida	The flight was halted by the Transportation Security Administration, air traffic control and local police after security agents notified supervisors that the pilots smelled of alcohol and acted belligerently. Sobriety tests showed that the pilots were legally intoxicated; they were fired by the airline the next day and eventually convicted of operating an aircraft while drunk.	none
America West Flight Airlines 794	August 28, 2002	A320-231	Phoenix, Arizona	The pilot failed to maintain directional control during landing, causing the aircraft to veer off the side of the runway onto a dirt infield, where the nose gear strut collapsed. The aircraft was written off. NTSB brief	1 serious, 9 minor

== See also ==
- List of defunct airlines of the United States
