= Arizona Business Gazette =

Newspaper in Phoenix, Arizona

- Type: Weekly newspaper
- Owner(s): Gannett
- Editor: Kimberly Quillen
- Headquarters: Phoenix, Arizona, United States
- Circulation: 193 Print; 229 E-Copies (as of 2022)
- Website: abgnews.com

Arizona Business Gazette is a business newspaper in Phoenix, Arizona, owed by Gannett Company not to be confused with the Arizona Gazette which is owned by Cody Agency, LLC. The Arizona Business Gazette is a spin-off of The Arizona Republic, it was downsized in 1997, and now mainly focuses on real-estate and local business news.
