= US Airways livery =

Insignia on airline's aircraft

US Airways had a variety of aircraft liveries under both its US Airways and USAir names. Its Express and Shuttle divisions had liveries that generally closely paralleled the company-wide livery at the time. The US Airways livery has been phased out, with aircraft bearing it having been either retired or repainted with the American Airlines livery following their merger. A single Airbus A321 formerly operated by US Airways currently retains the livery, as a tribute to the former airline by American.

== History ==
In 1979, USAir introduced its new livery, a primarily unpainted plane, with an orange, red, and brown running strip, and a stylized USAir title, with the "A" written as a triangle. The "A" was very similar to the "A" which had been used in the final Allegheny Airlines livery/logo. Multiple variations of this livery existed, and included the basic livery on a white fuselage. Around this same time, several aircraft received experimental paint schemes with different striping and tail designs, though none were ultimately adopted fleet-wide.

In the late 1980s, at the time of Piedmont Airlines being acquired, the company changed its colors to red, white, and blue. The livery adopted under this scheme continued to use a primarily unpainted plane, instead with a thick red cheatline, topped by a narrower blue one. USAir was converted to a more standard logo, written in a serif font. The tail of the livery was painted blue with three red stripes.

In 1997, upon the company's re-branding as US Airways a new livery was introduced. Similar to the Jordanian flag carrier, Royal Jordanian Airlines, the upper portion of the plane was painted in very dark blue, the lower portion of the plane in light grey, separated by a white and red cheatline. The US Airways title was painted in a white serif font, accompanied by a stylized flag logo. The tail of the airplane was also painted in very dark blue to match the upper fuselage, with the stylized flag painted on the tail in grey. In addition the company's MetroJet division had a livery derived from this livery, instead with a bright red in place of the blue, and the title MetroJet, in place of US Airways. The tail and underbelly of the livery remained the same as the US Airways mainline livery. Additionally, during this period several planes were painted with the Star Alliance livery, which featured the Star Alliance logo on the tail of the airplane, and the title Star Alliance painted prominently on the airplane. With US Airways' departure from Star Alliance, all of these aircraft were repainted into the new American Airlines livery.

== Final livery ==
After the 2005 merger of US Airways and America West Airlines, an off-white livery was chosen to better meet operational needs due to the summer heat at the Phoenix Sky Harbor International Airport and Las Vegas McCarran International Airport hubs inherited from America West.

The livery incorporated the basic colors from the previous livery, adding curving gray stripes on the rear fuselage reminiscent of those seen on the previous America West scheme. The logos of the four airlines that formed US Airways were painted in miniature near the main cabin door.

Since January 2014, following the merger of US Airways with American Airlines, all US Airways aircraft, except for the heritage A319s and A321 noted below, were painted in American's livery. The first jet to re-enter revenue service was an Airbus A319, tail number N700UW, which previously sported a Star Alliance branding.

== Logo planes ==
The post-merger US Airways continued the America West tradition of logo jets and only used Airbus A319 aircraft for these special liveries. US Airways had established marketing agreements with four NFL franchises, all located in the airline's hubs or focus cities:

- Carolina Panthers: An Airbus A319 operated by US Airways, introduced in September 2007

=== Former logo planes ===
- Teamwork Coast to Coast: A Boeing 757–200 operated by America West Airlines which symbolized America West flying coast to coast.
- Arizona: An Airbus A319 operated by America West Airlines, introduced in May 2007
- Arizona: A Boeing 757–200 operated by America West Airlines with full aircraft paint
- Arizona Cardinals: An Airbus A319 operated by America West Airlines, introduced in December 2006
- Arizona Diamondbacks: A Boeing 757–200 operated by America West Airlines previously in the Diamondbacks former team colors. Repainted into regular US Airways livery over the winter of 2006.
- Nevada: An Airbus A319 operated by America West Airlines, introduced in May 2007.
- Nevada: A Boeing 757–200 operated by America West Airlines painted with full aircraft paint
- Ohio: A Boeing 757–200 operated by America West Airlines
- Philadelphia Eagles: An Airbus A319 operated by US Airways, introduced in October 2006
- Pittsburgh Steelers: An Airbus A319 operated by US Airways, introduced in August 2007
- Dot-Com Scheme: Two Boeing 737-300s operated by US Airways were stripped of their paint and marked the return of a bare-metal scheme at the airline. The planes exhibited the "USAirways.Com" livery so the fuselage could be easily examined, due to crack issues around various joints of the fuselage.
- Unauthorized PSA Smilies: Since the merger with Pacific Southwest Airlines various aircraft were painted with officially unauthorized black smiles on the underside of the nose of the aircraft.

== Heritage liveries ==
In addition, several airplanes were painted with heritage liveries, incorporating the look of the previous airlines, but including the US Airways titles. The aircraft were also re-registered with suffixes representative of the original carriers.

Shortly after their introduction, all three received revisions to better reflect the original liveries; the Piedmont heritage plane was painted in a more accurate blue, the airplane type was added to the tail to match the Piedmont standard, and the US Airways title was changed to red. The Allegheny heritage plane was given a more accurate grey underbelly, a more appropriately sized running strip, and the registration was moved above the window line. The PSA heritage plane received a larger, more accurate smile.

Two planes were painted with heritage America West liveries – one with the mid-1990s livery and one with the 1980s livery heritage plane reflecting America West's original livery, with a US Airways logo on the front.

Following the merger with American Airlines, except for the aircraft with the original America West livery, all of the heritage planes retained the same livery, but with American's logo on the forward fuselage replacing the US Airways titles. Additionally, American created another US Airways heritage livery post-merger: the final US Airways (2005) livery, incorporating the US Airways livery with American titles. Unlike the previous heritage liveries, which were all on Airbus A319s, this heritage livery appears on an Airbus A321 which was the final plane delivered in US Airways livery.

== Gallery ==
=== Standard liveries ===
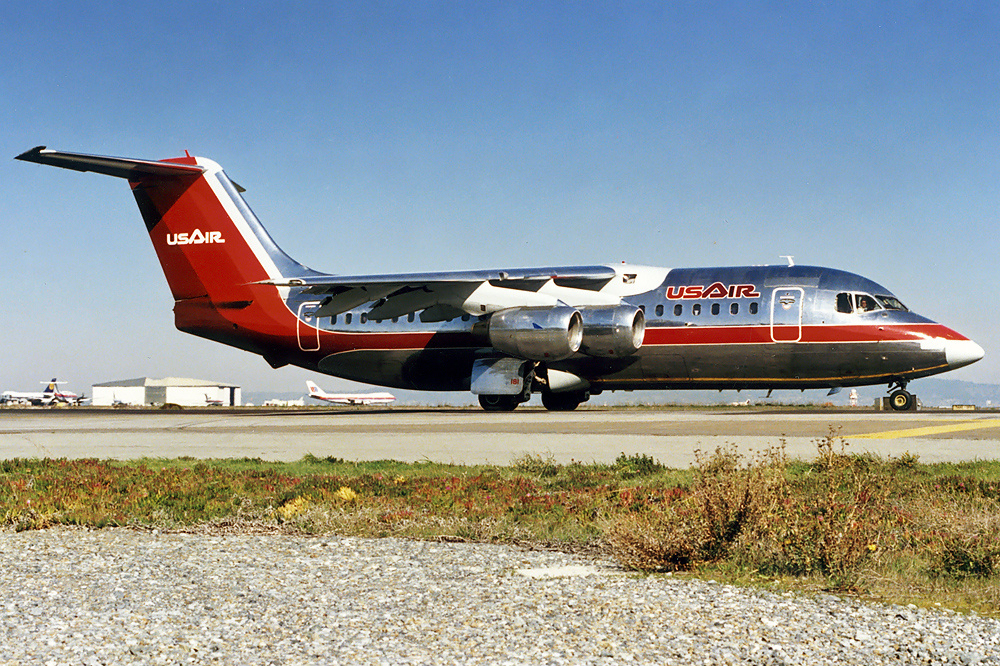
British Aerospace 146 in initial USAir livery

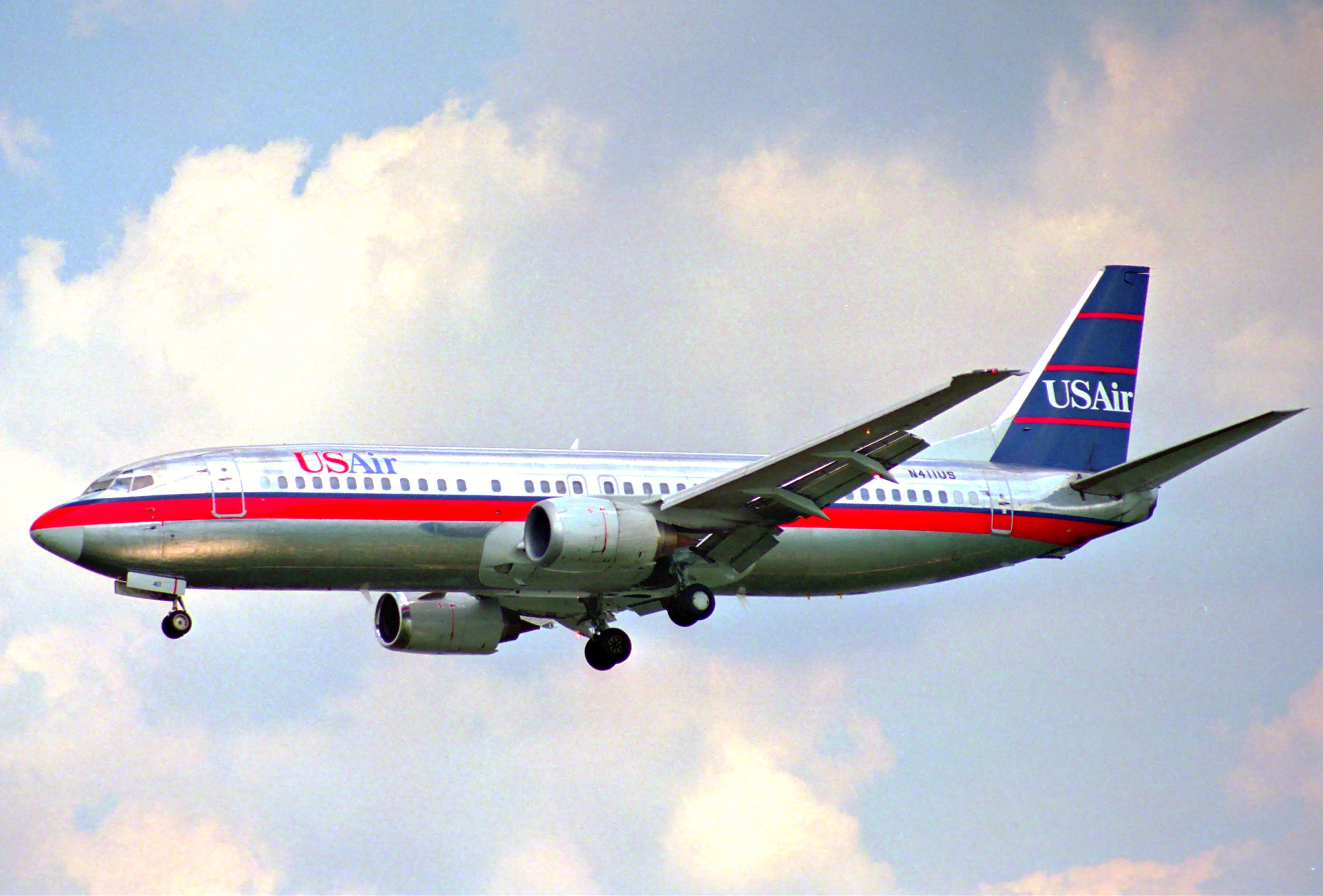
Boeing 737 in final USAir livery

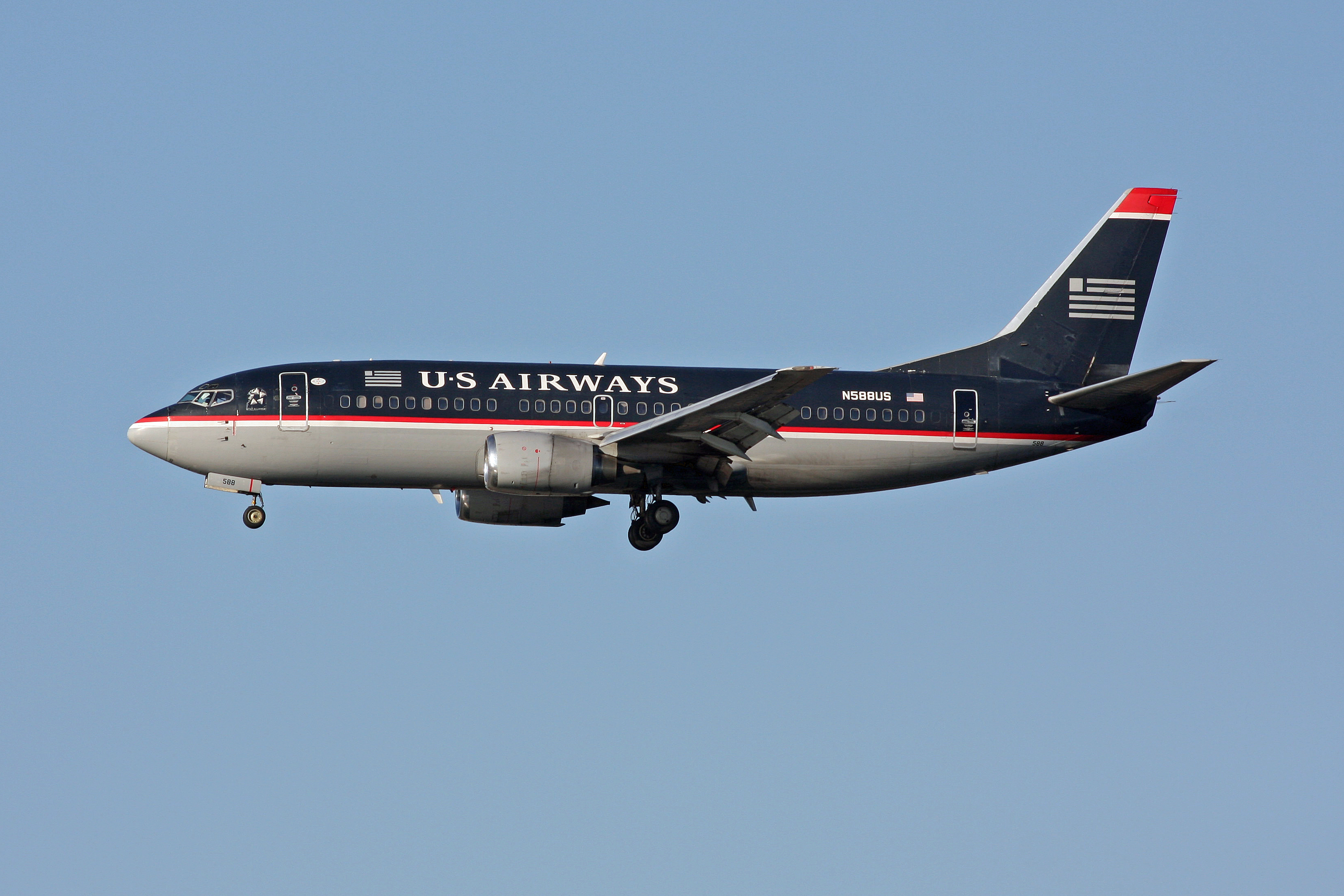
Boeing 737 in initial US Airways livery

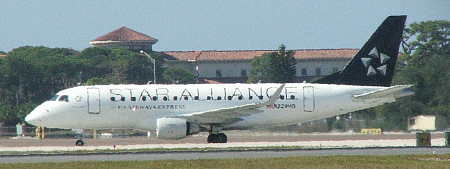
Embraer 170 operated by Republic Airlines in Star Alliance livery

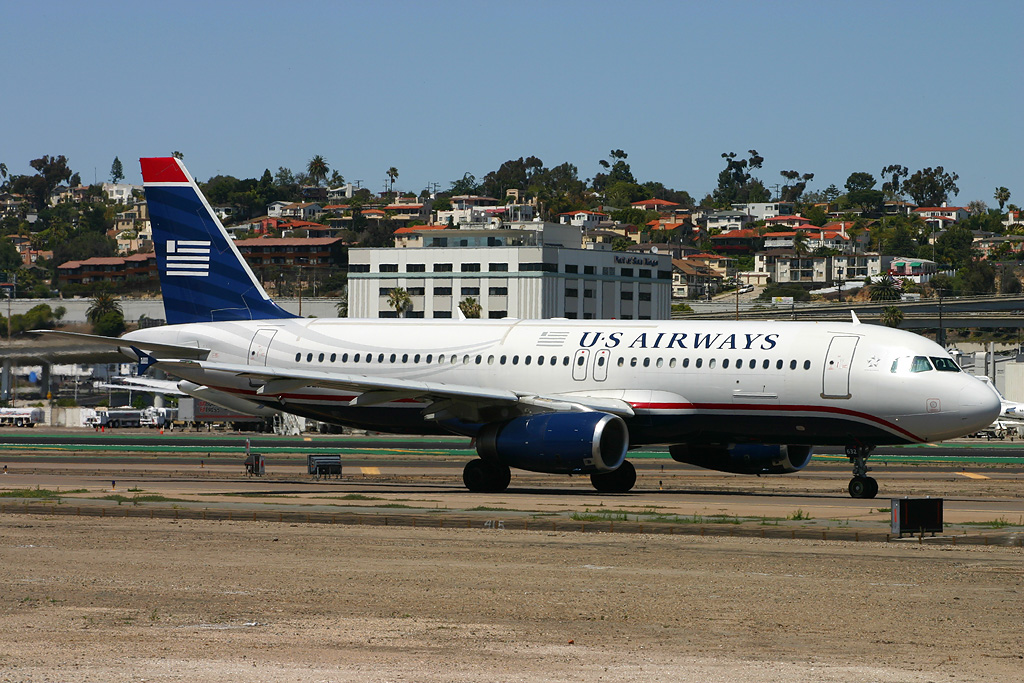
Airbus A320 in post-America West merger livery

=== Heritage liveries ===
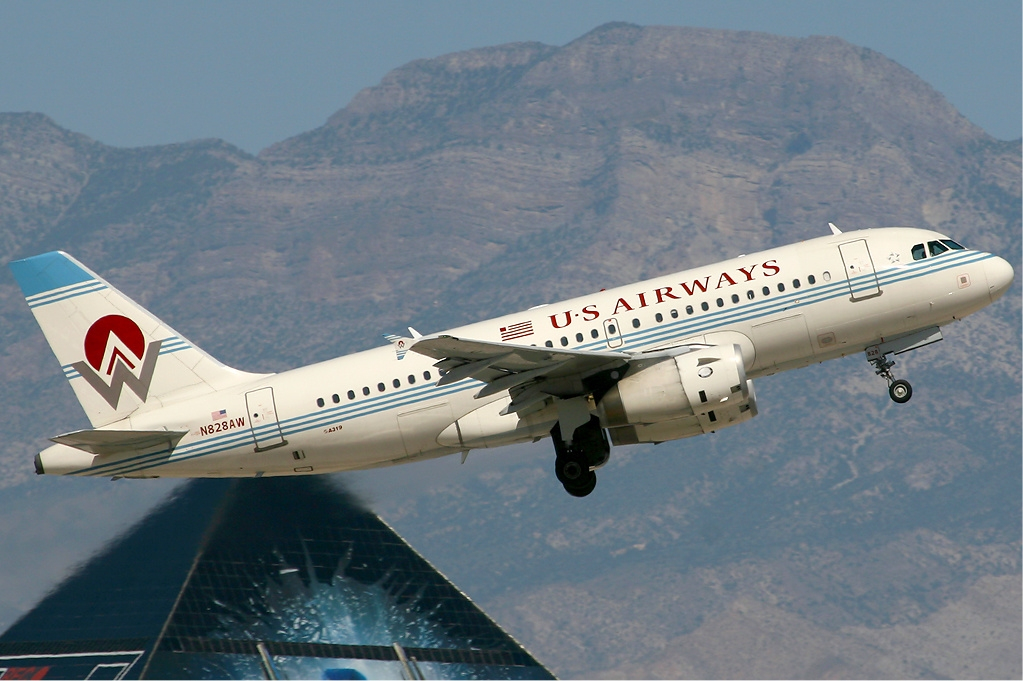
Airbus A319 in 1980s America West Heritage Livery

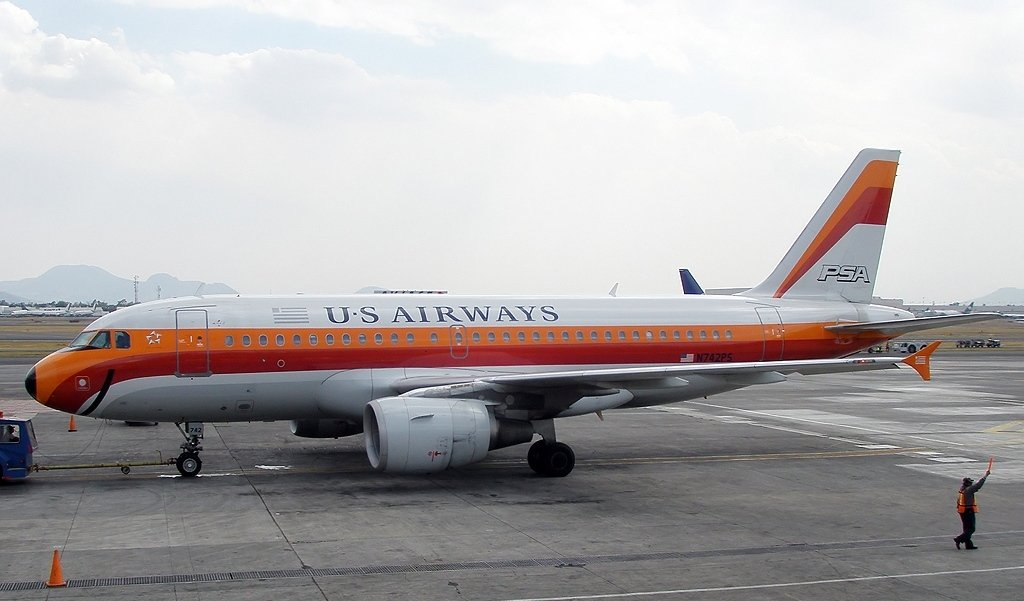
Airbus A319 in Pacific Southwest Airlines Heritage Livery

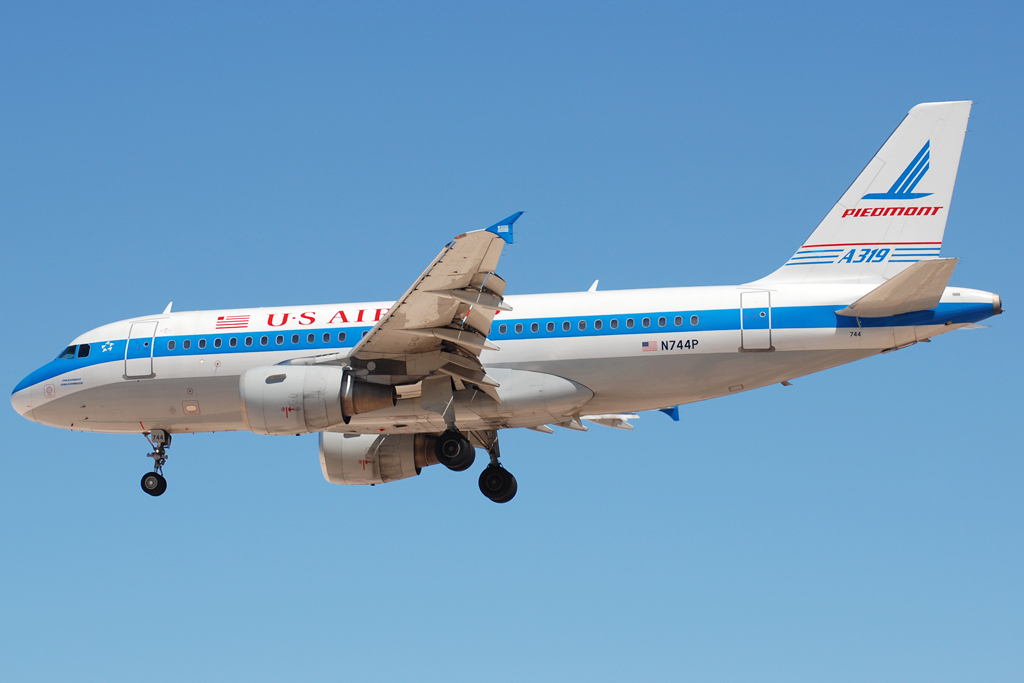
Airbus A319 in Piedmont Heritage Livery

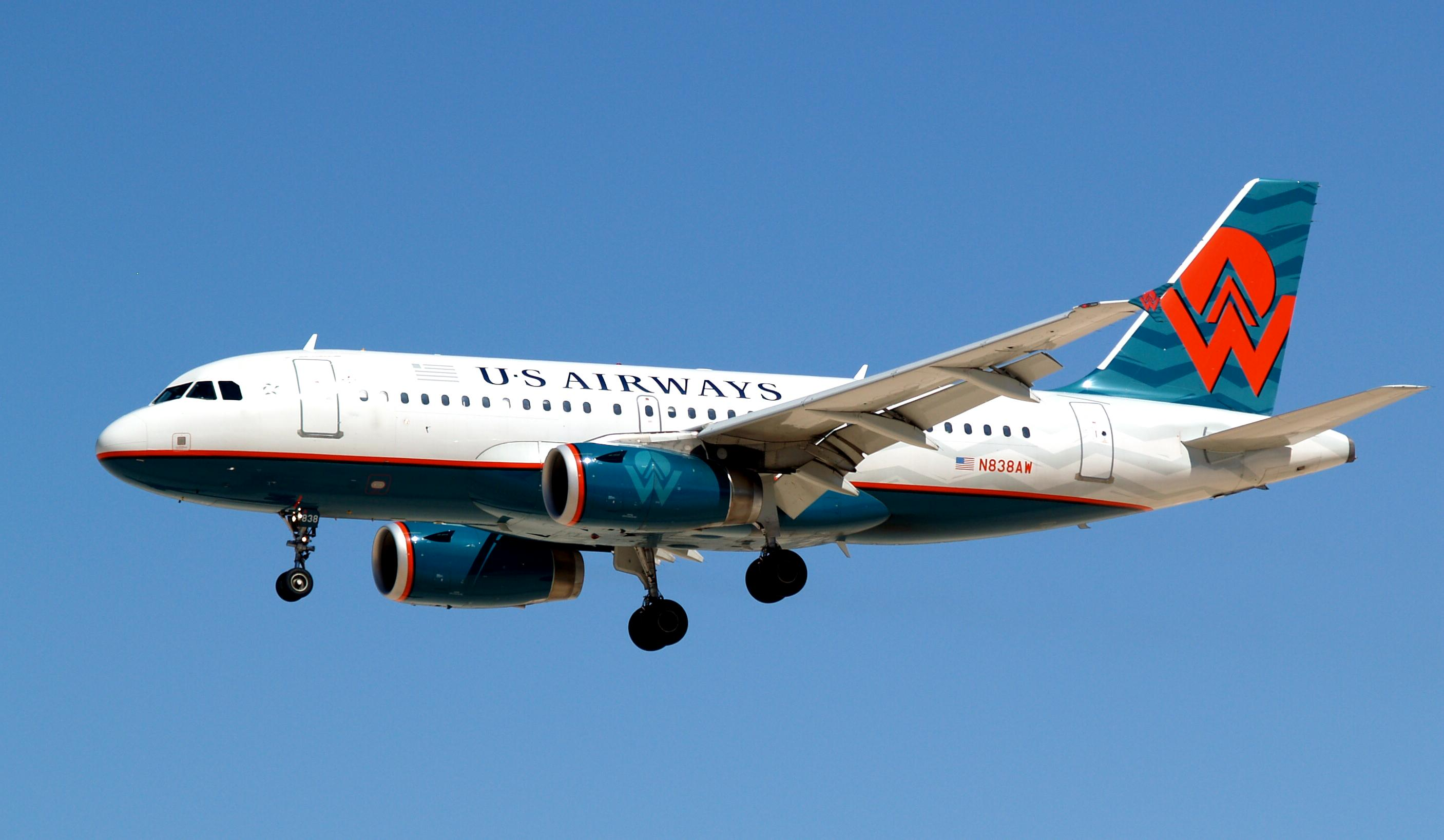
Airbus A319 in 1994 America West Heritage Livery

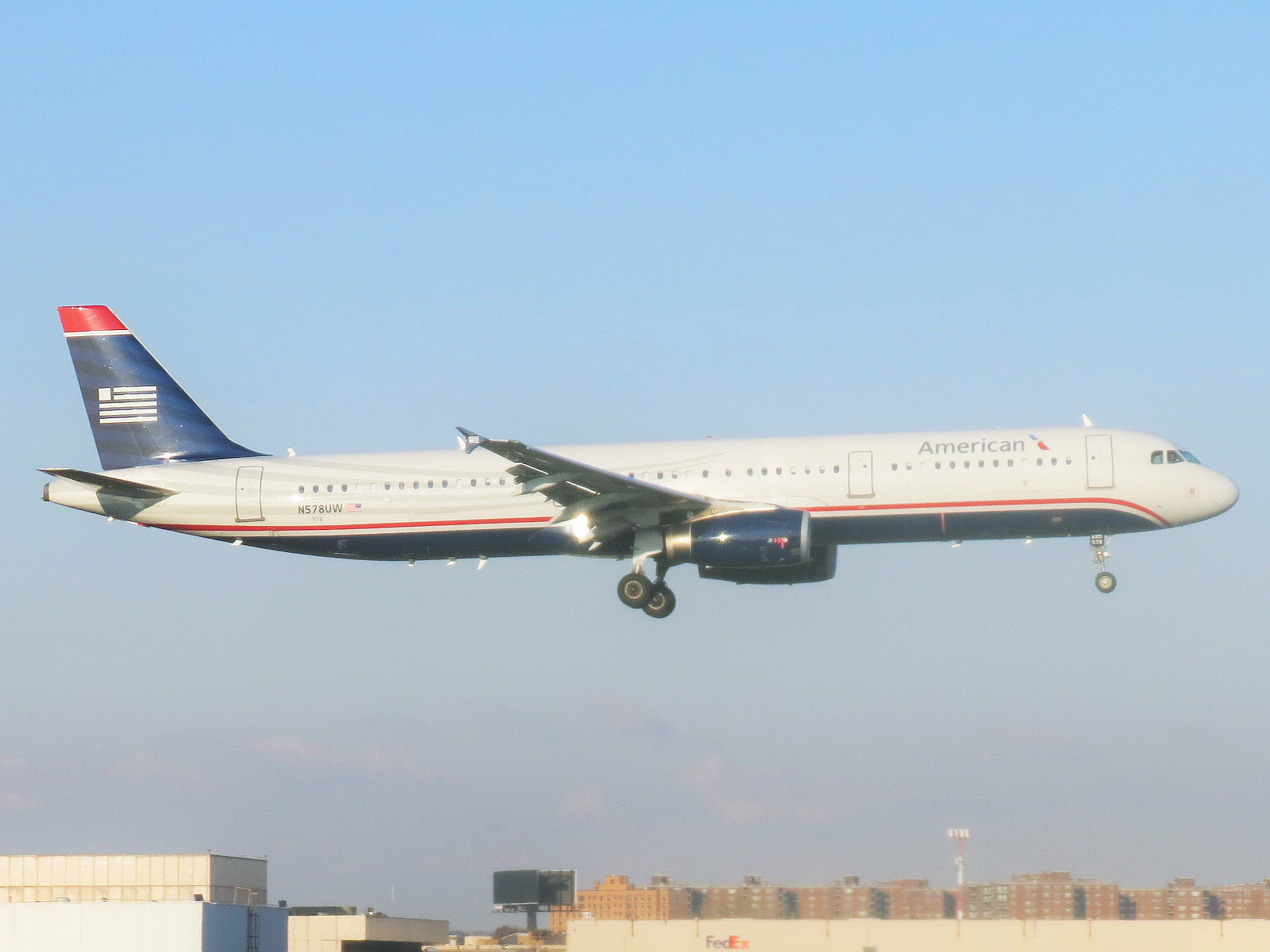
Airbus A321 post-merger in the final US Airways (now Heritage) livery

=== Sports liveries ===
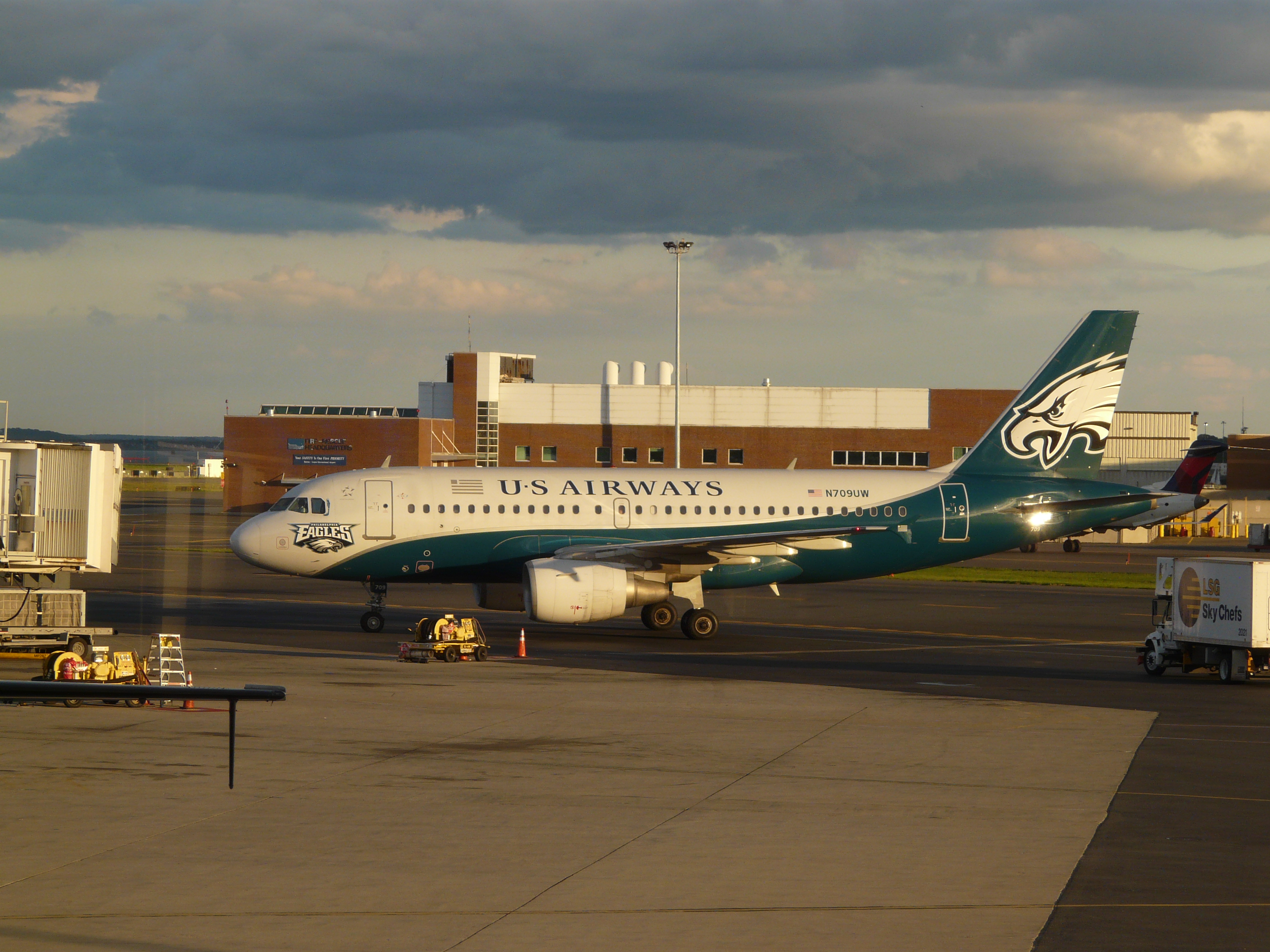
Airbus A319 in Philadelphia Eagles livery

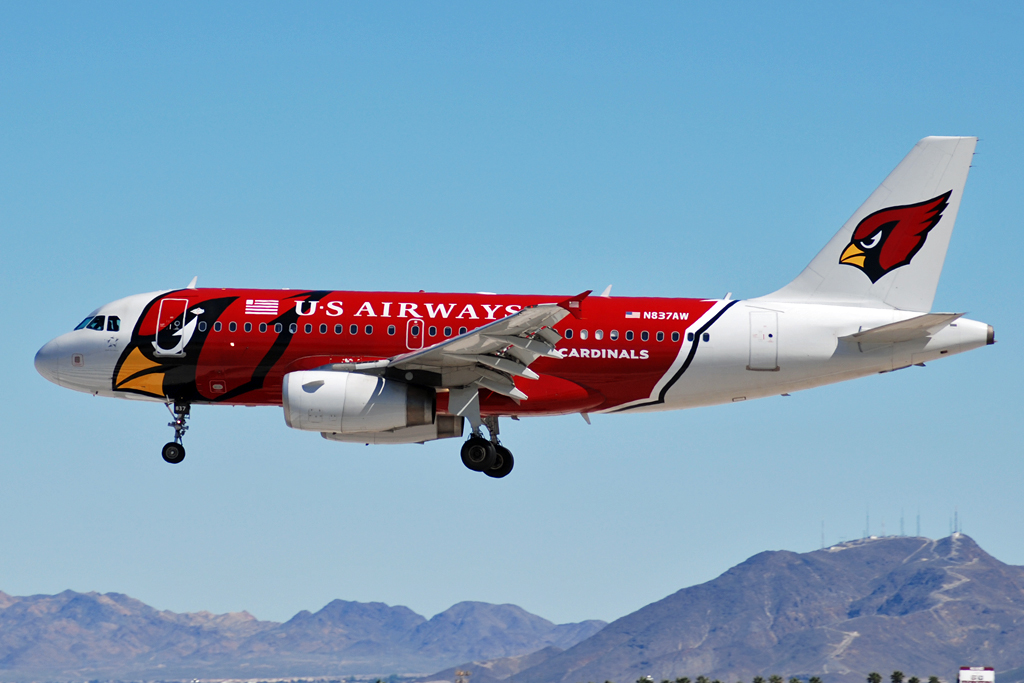
Airbus A319 in Arizona Cardinals livery

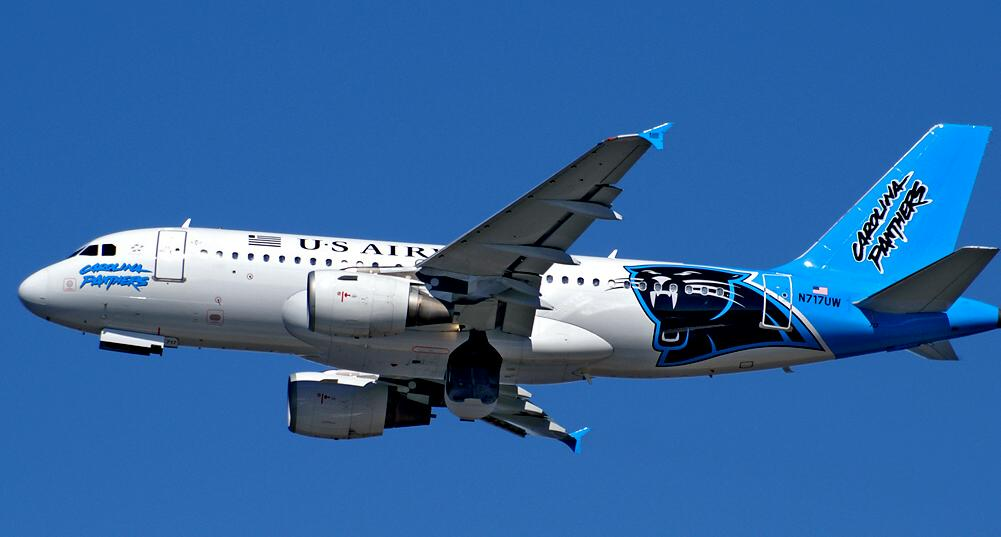
Airbus A319 in Carolina Panthers livery

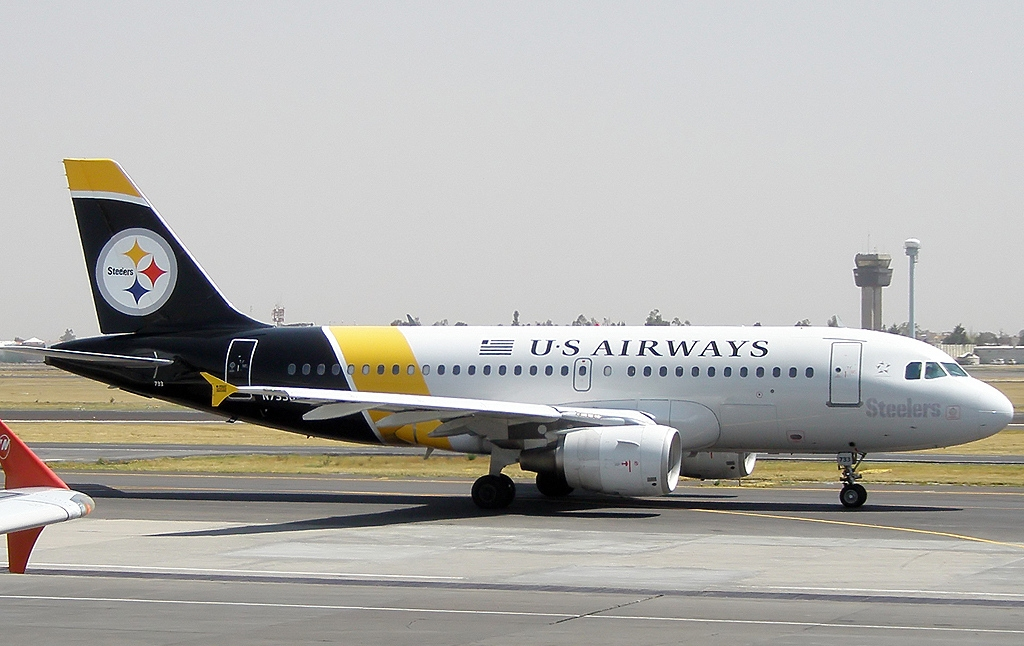
Airbus A319 in Pittsburgh Steelers livery

=== State liveries ===
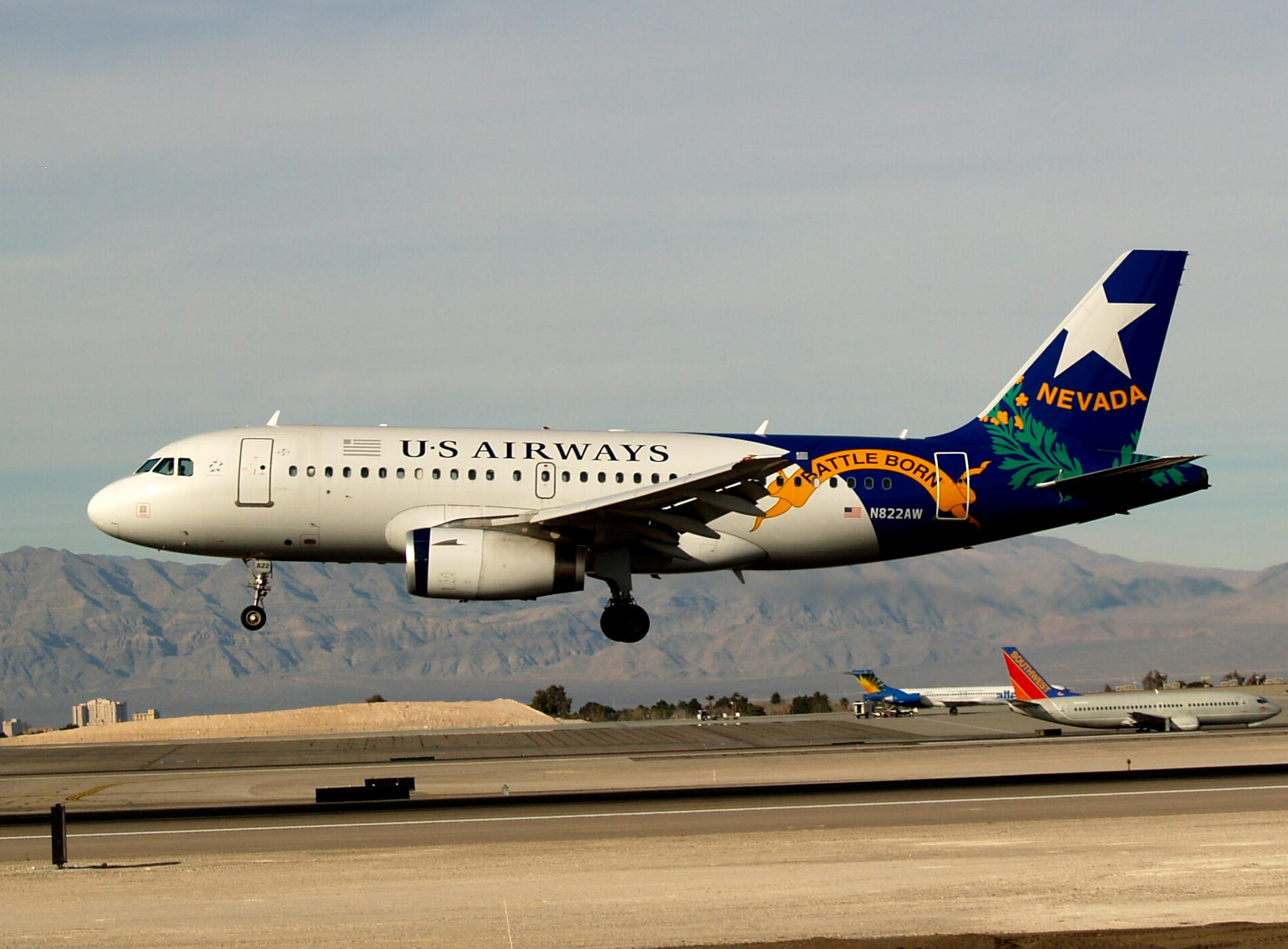
Airbus A319 in Nevada state livery

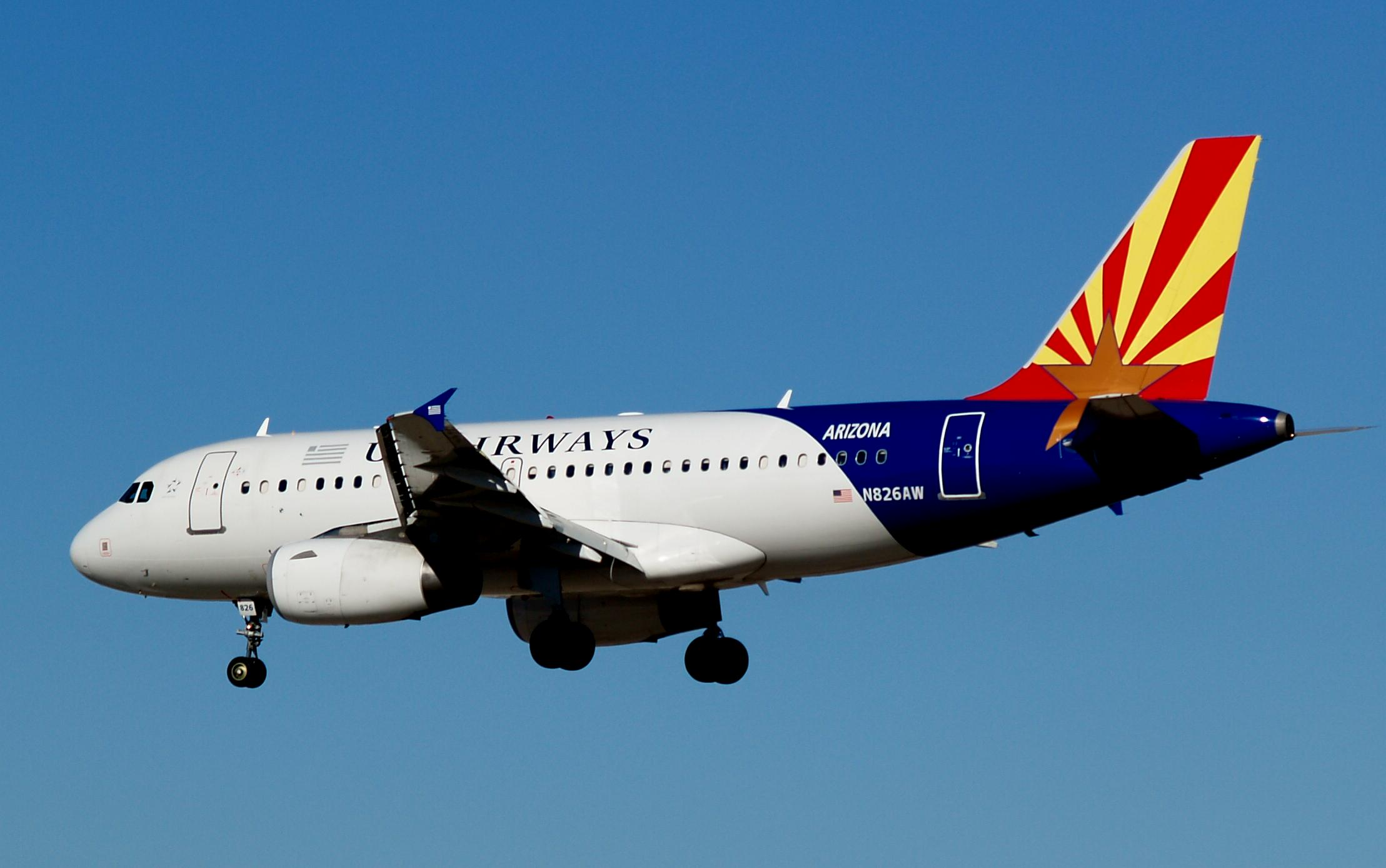
Airbus A319 in Arizona state livery

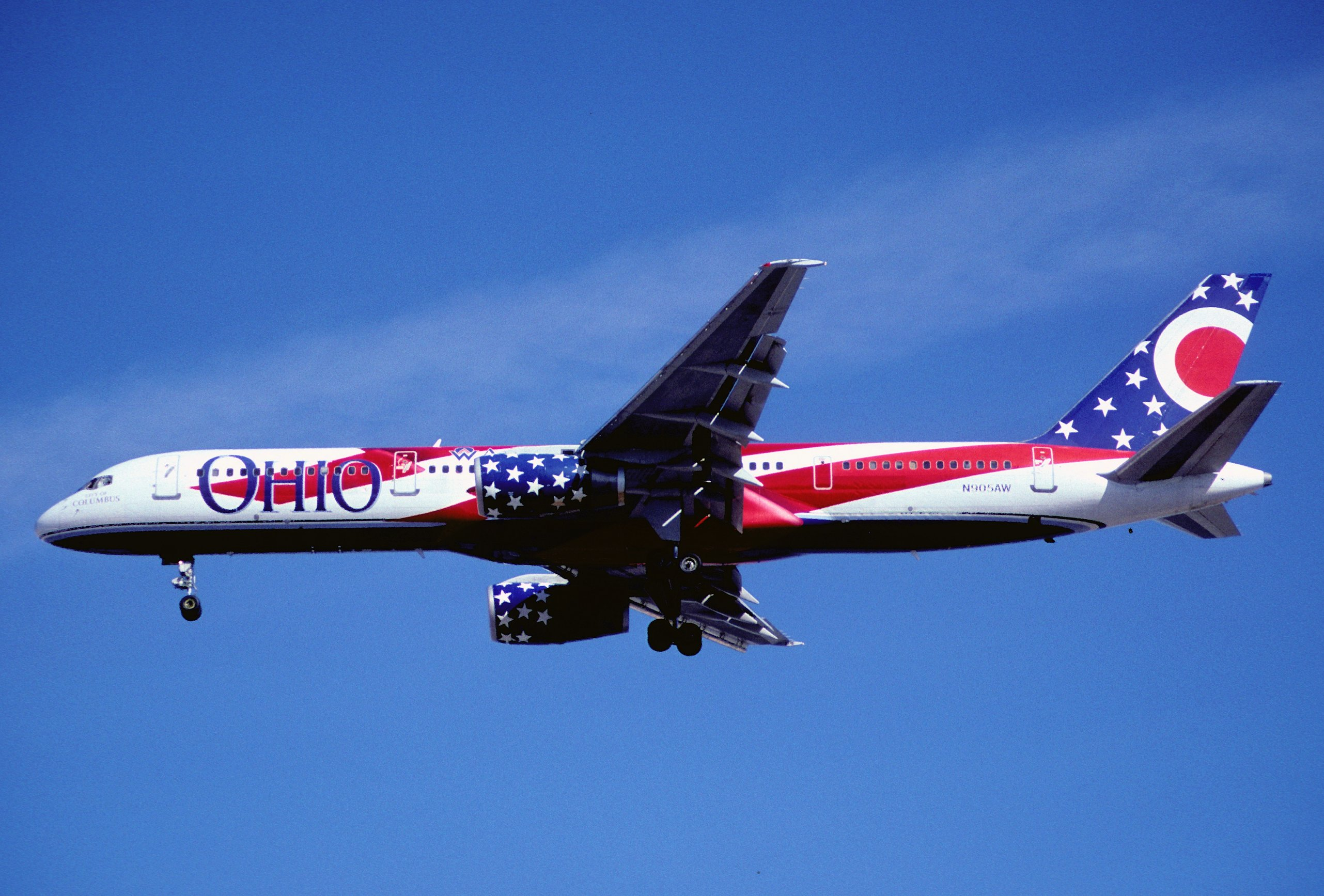
Boeing 757 in Ohio state livery
