= American Airlines fleet =

Aircraft operated by American Airlines

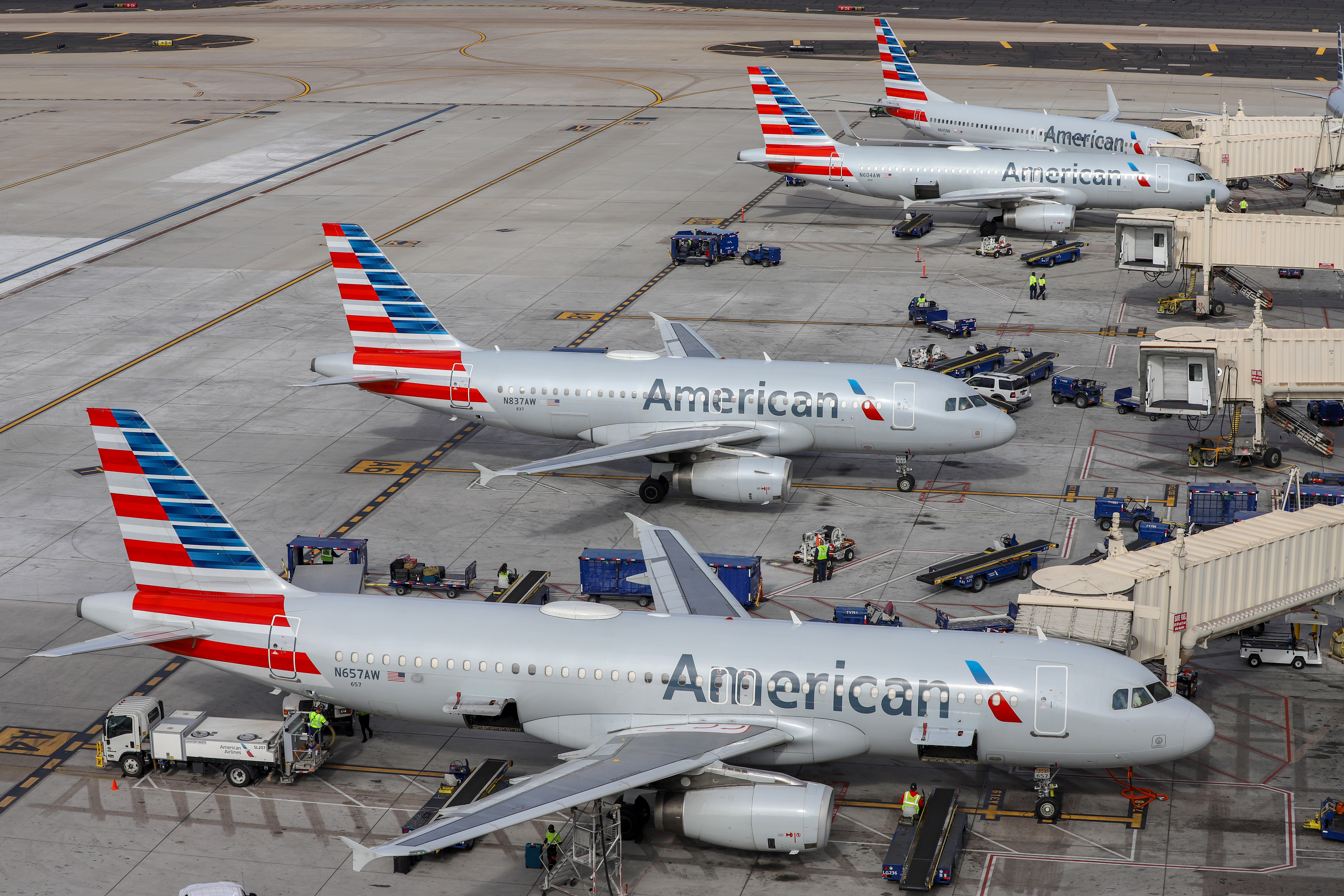
American Airlines Airbus A320 family aircraft at Phoenix Sky Harbor International Airport

As of June 2026, the American Airlines fleet consists of 1,030 mainline aircraft, making it the second largest commercial airline fleet in the world. The fleet consists of Airbus and Boeing narrow-body aircraft, and Boeing wide-body aircraft. American exclusively ordered Boeing aircraft throughout the 2000s until July 20, 2011, when American announced the largest combined aircraft order in history for 260 Airbus A320 family and 200 Boeing 737 aircraft. As of October 2025, American has 301 Airbus and Boeing aircraft on order along with 20 orders and 40 options for Boom Overture supersonic aircraft. The average age of the American mainline fleet is 14.7 years as of September 2026.

As of 2024, American Airlines has four maintenance bases: Tulsa, Pittsburgh, Dallas Fort Worth, and Charlotte Douglas airports.

== Fleet ==
As of June 2026, American Airlines operates the following mainline aircraft:

Aircraft	In service	Orders	Passengers						Notes
Aircraft	In service	Orders	F	J	W	Y+	Y	Total	Notes
Airbus A319-100	126	—	—	8	—	24	96	128	Largest operator. Being reconfigured with more first class seats.
Airbus A319-100	6	—	—	12	—	24	96	132	Largest operator. Being reconfigured with more first class seats.
Airbus A320-200	48	—	—	12	—	18	120	150	Being reconfigured with more first class seats and new interior.
Airbus A320-200	—	—	—	16	—	33	101	150	Being reconfigured with more first class seats and new interior.
Airbus A321-200	203	—	—	20	—	35	135	190	Largest operator.
Airbus A321-200	15	—	10	20	—	36	36	102	Transcontinental configuration, to be reconfigured into standard.
Airbus A321neo	74	132	—	20	—	35	141	196	
Airbus A321neo	10	—	—	20	—	35	135	190	Former Alaska Airlines aircraft.
Airbus A321XLR	5	35	—	20	12	12	111	155	
Boeing 737-800	303	—	—	16	—	24	132	172	
Boeing 737 MAX 8	103	—	—	16	—	24	132	172	
Boeing 737 MAX 10	—	115	TBA						Deliveries from 2029.
Boeing 777-200ER	47	—	—	37	24	66	146	273	
Boeing 777-300ER	19	—	8	52	28	28	188	304	
Boeing 777-300ER	1	—	—	70	44	30	186	330	
Boeing 787-8	37	—	—	20	28	48	138	234	Largest operator.
Boeing 787-9	22	—	—	30	21	27	207	285	
Boeing 787-9	11	19	—	51	32	18	143	244	
Total	1,030	301							

=== Gallery ===
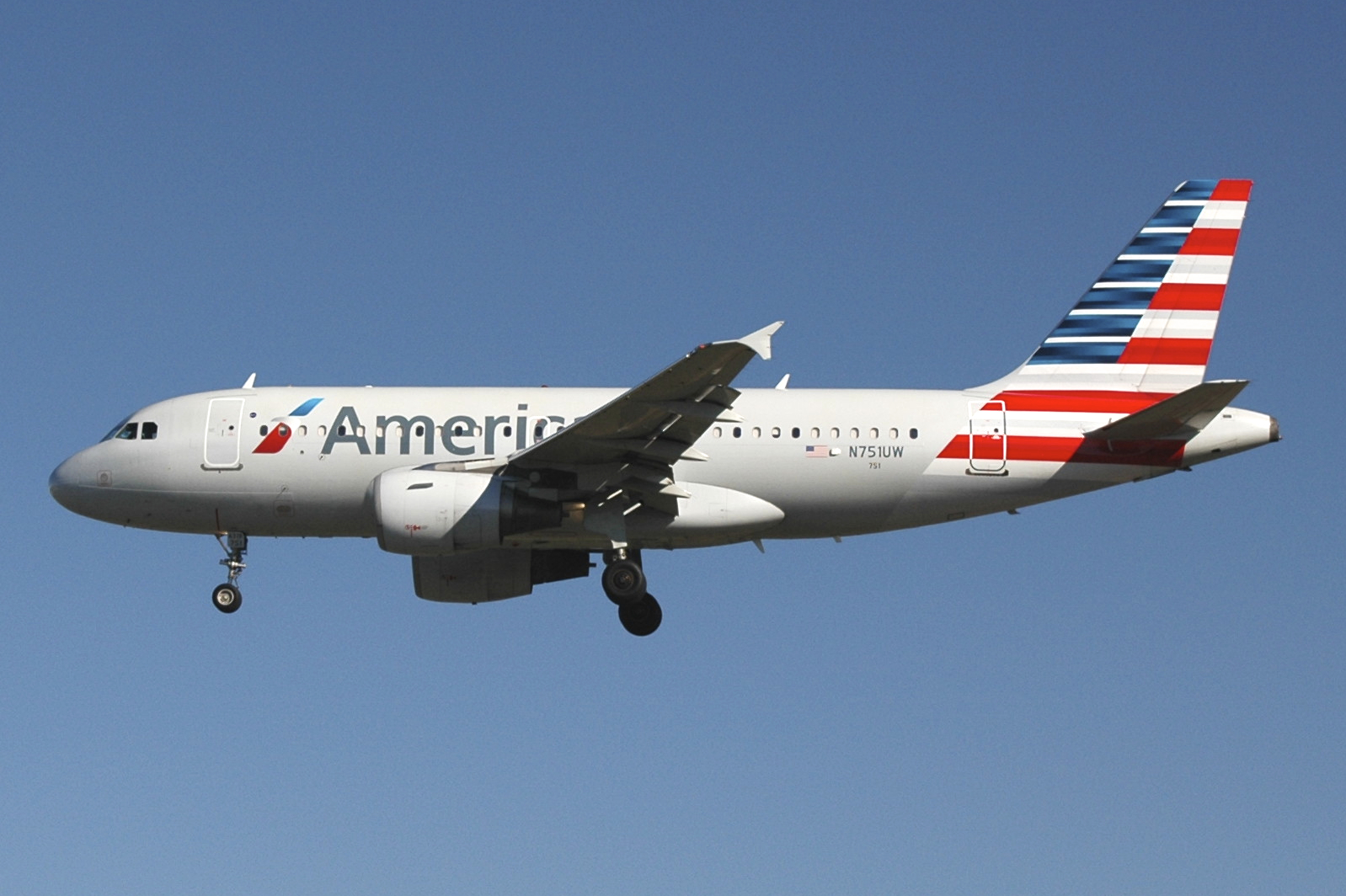
Airbus A319-100

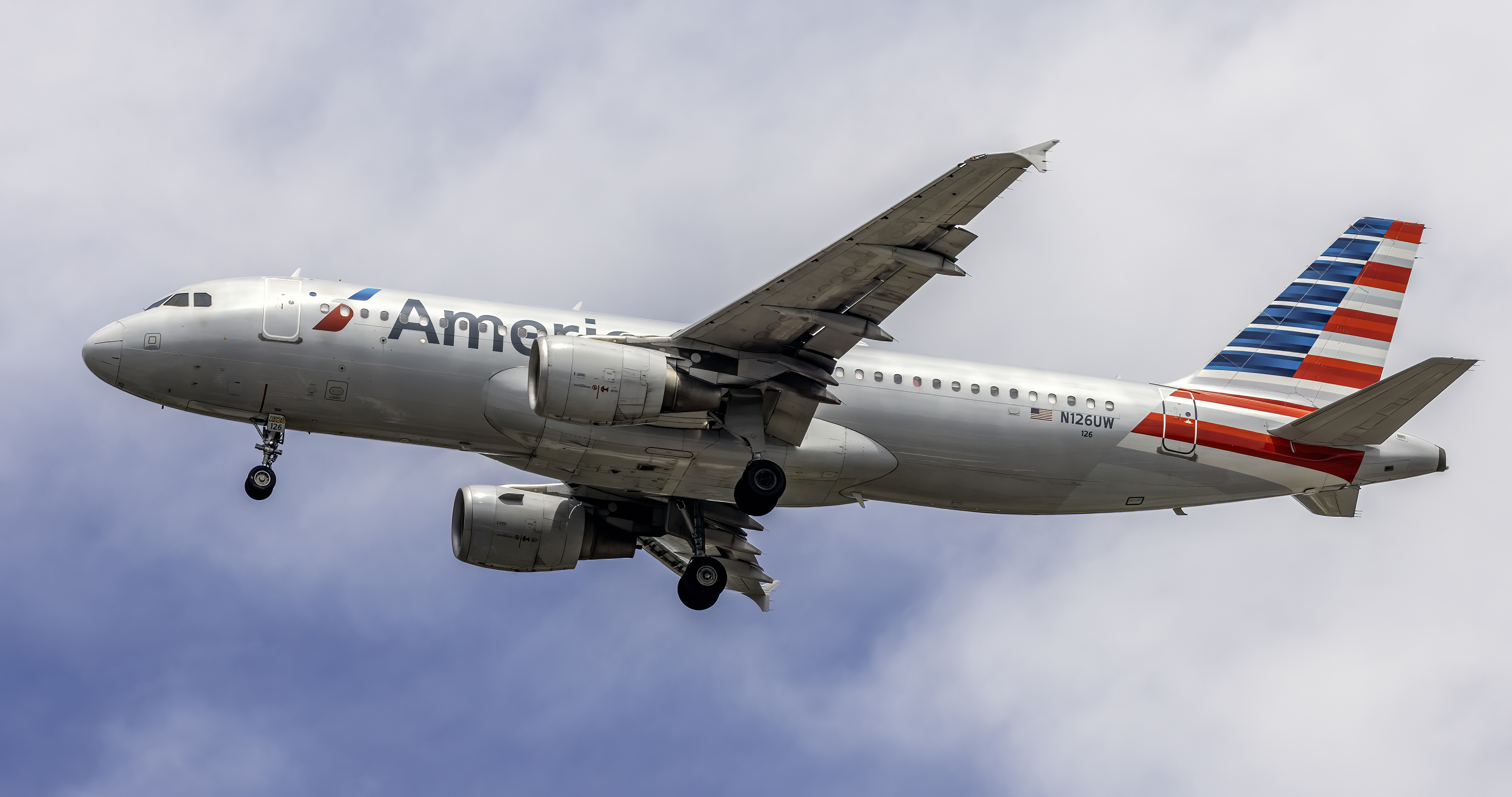
Airbus A320-200

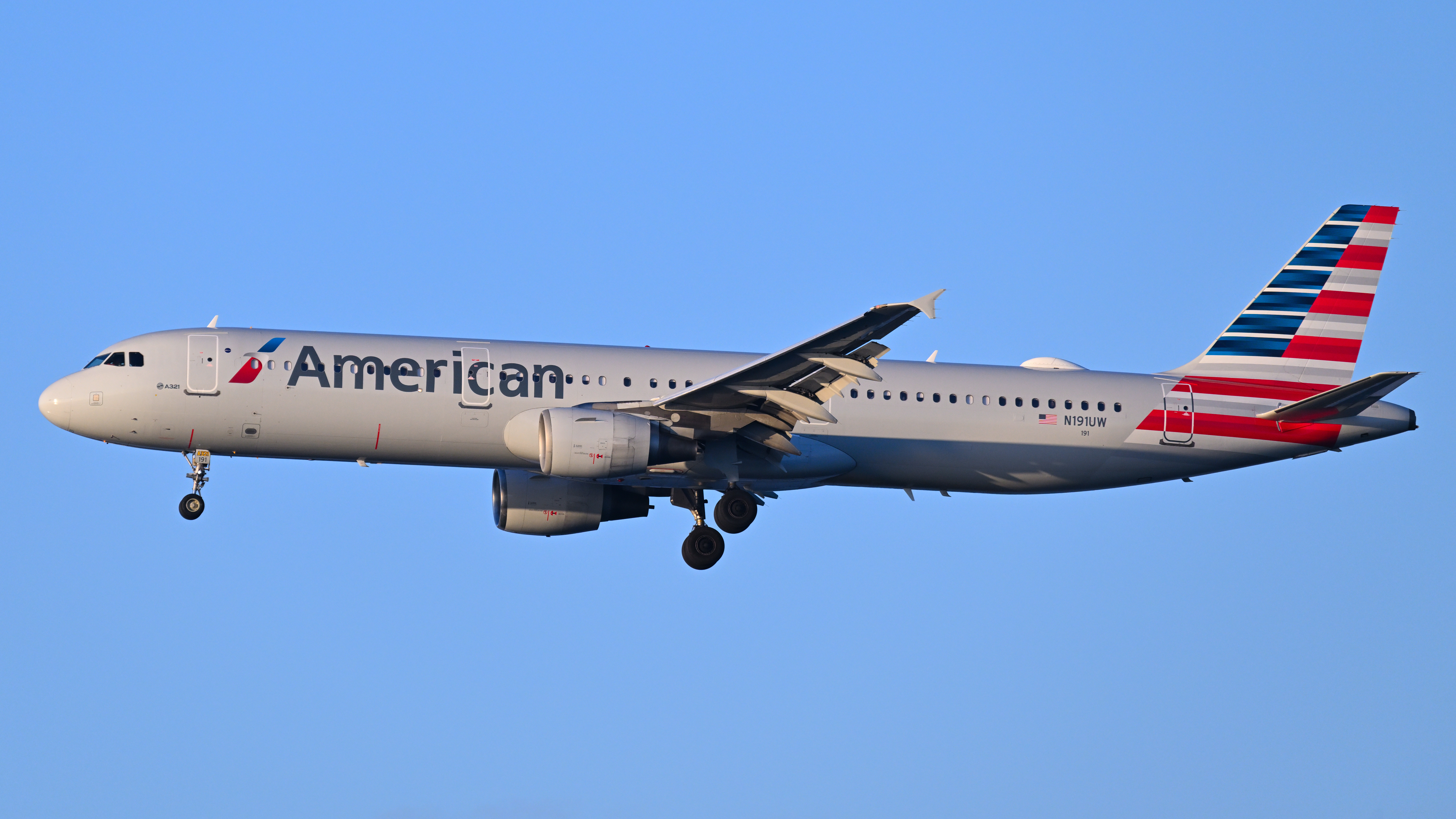
Airbus A321-200

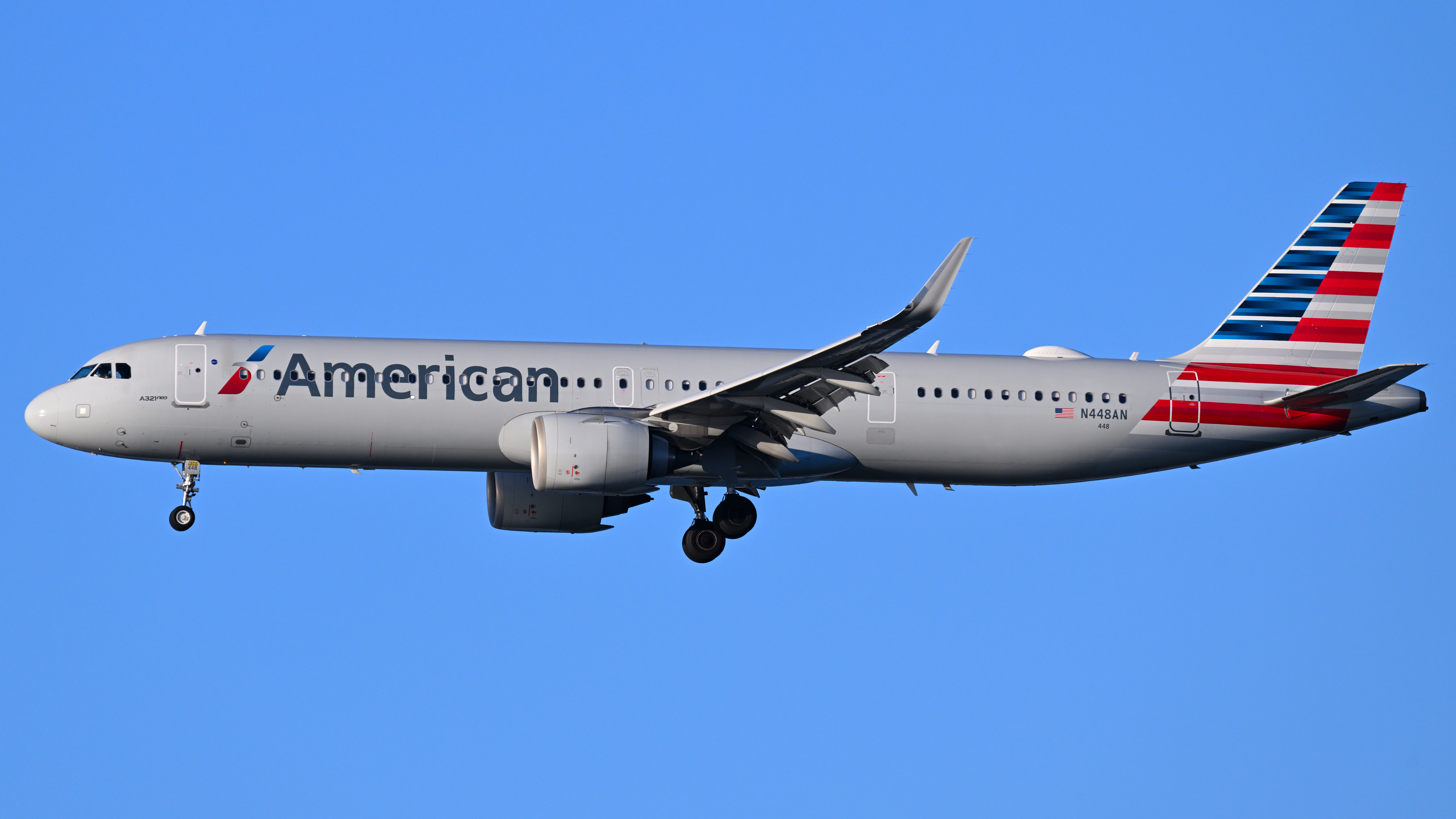
Airbus A321neo

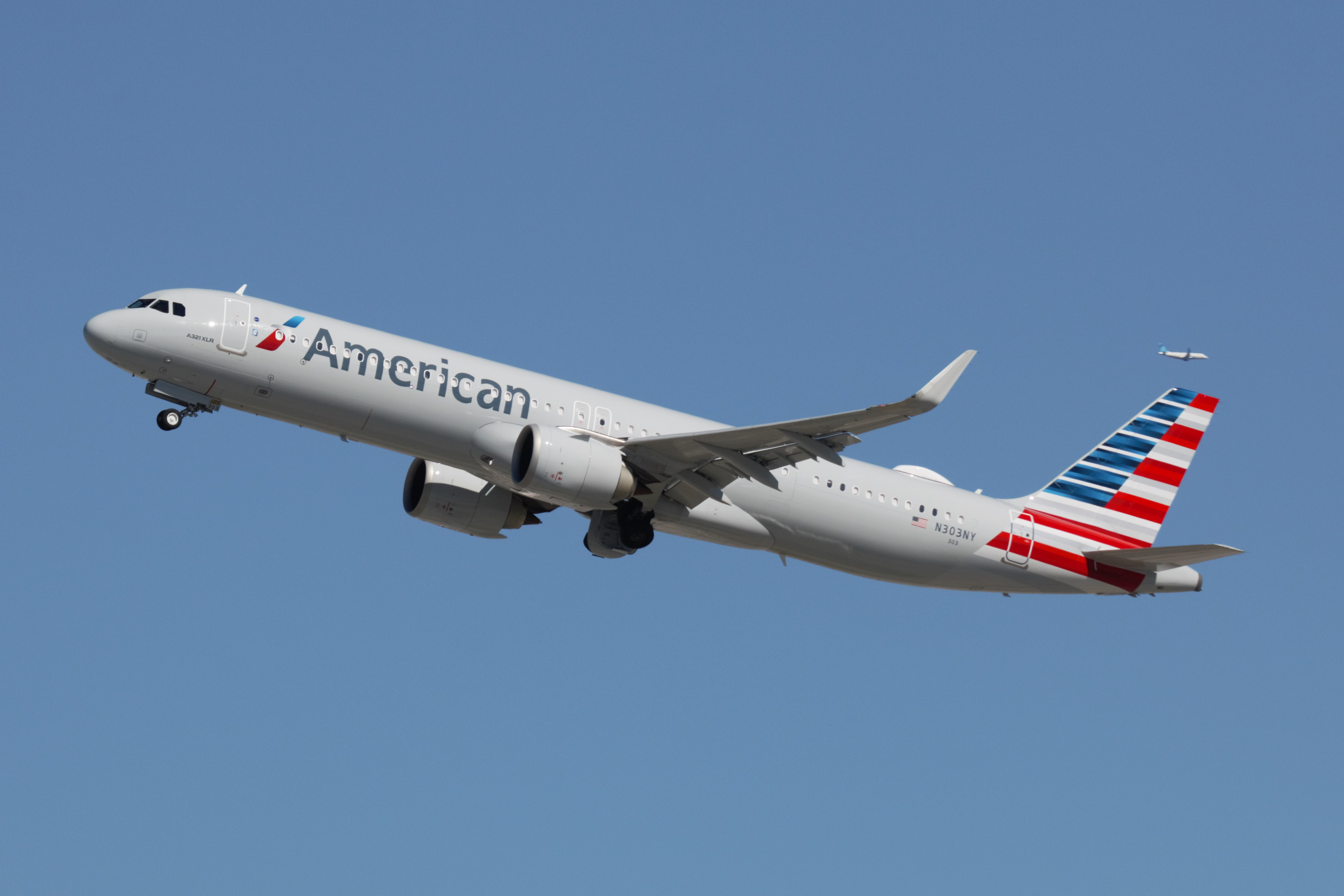
Airbus A321XLR

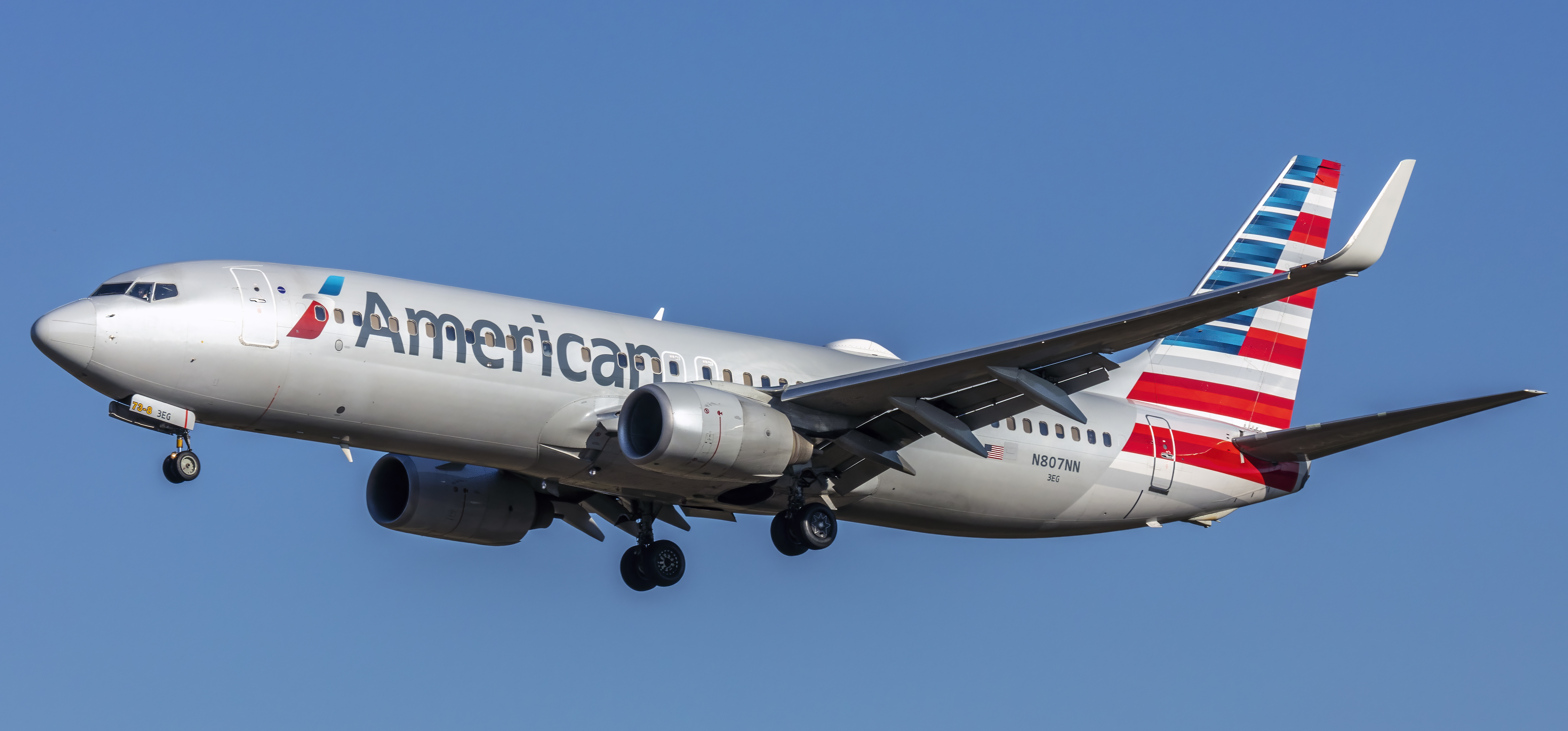
Boeing 737-800

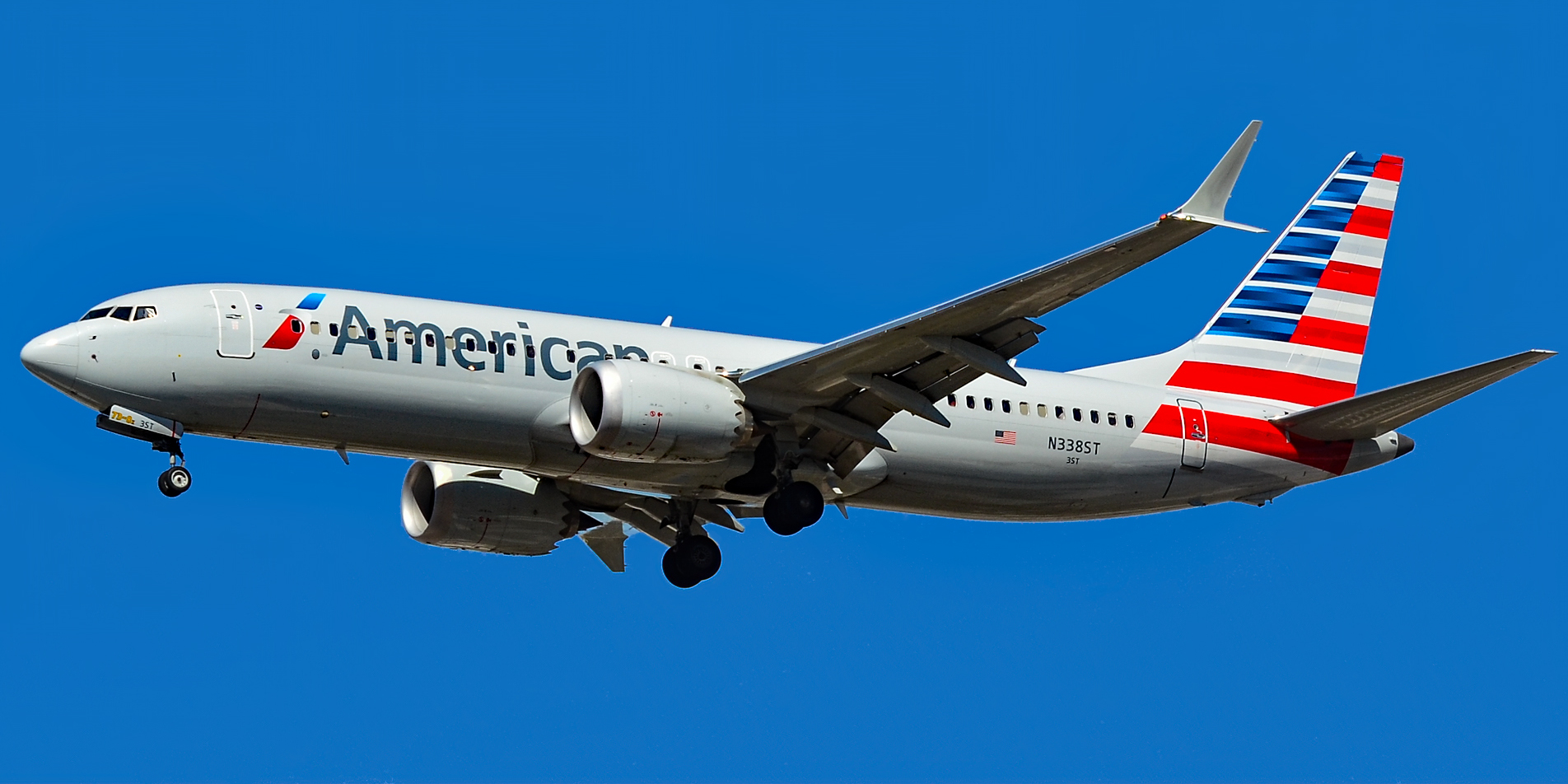
Boeing 737 MAX 8

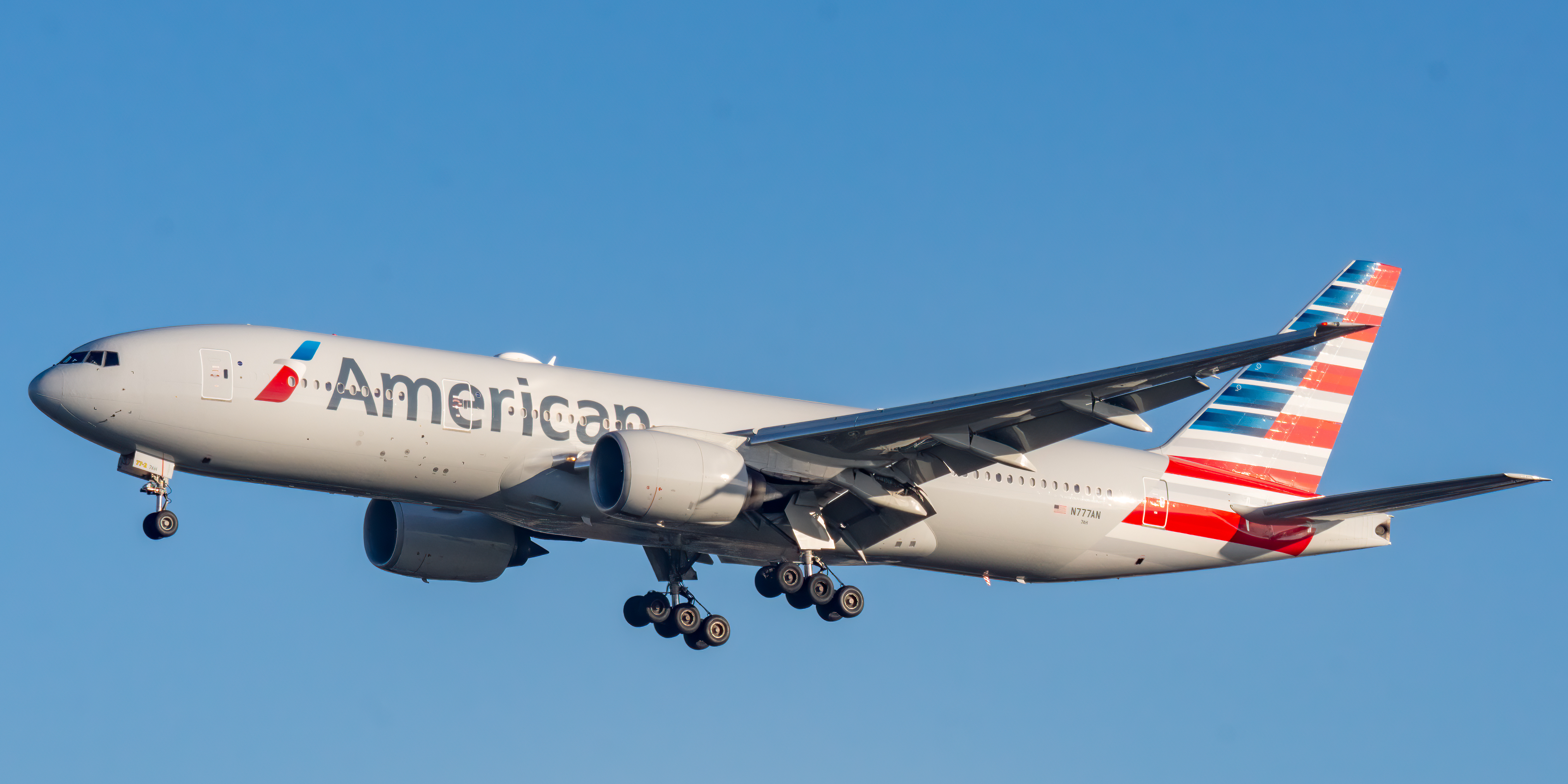
Boeing 777-200ER

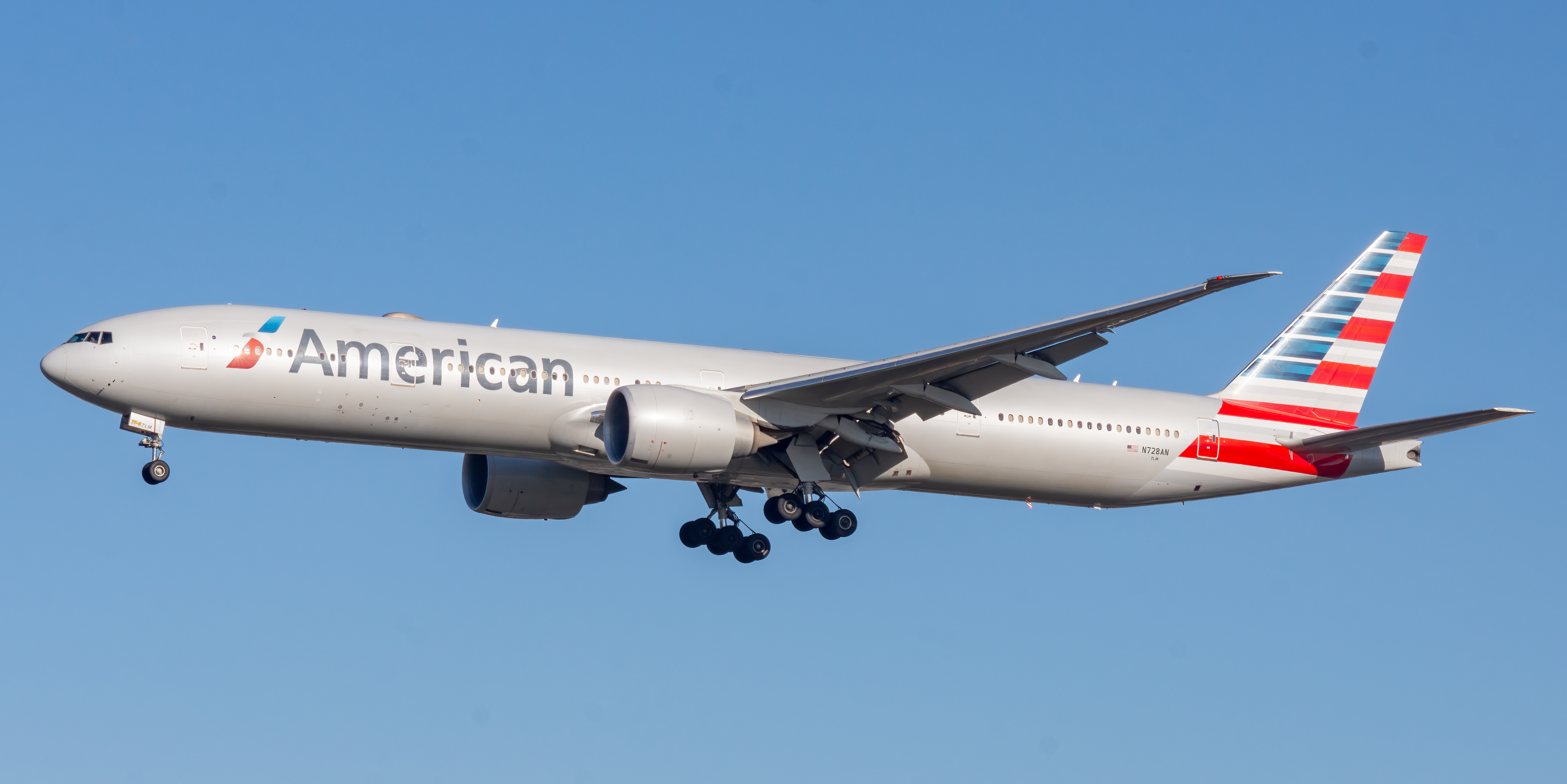
Boeing 777-300ER

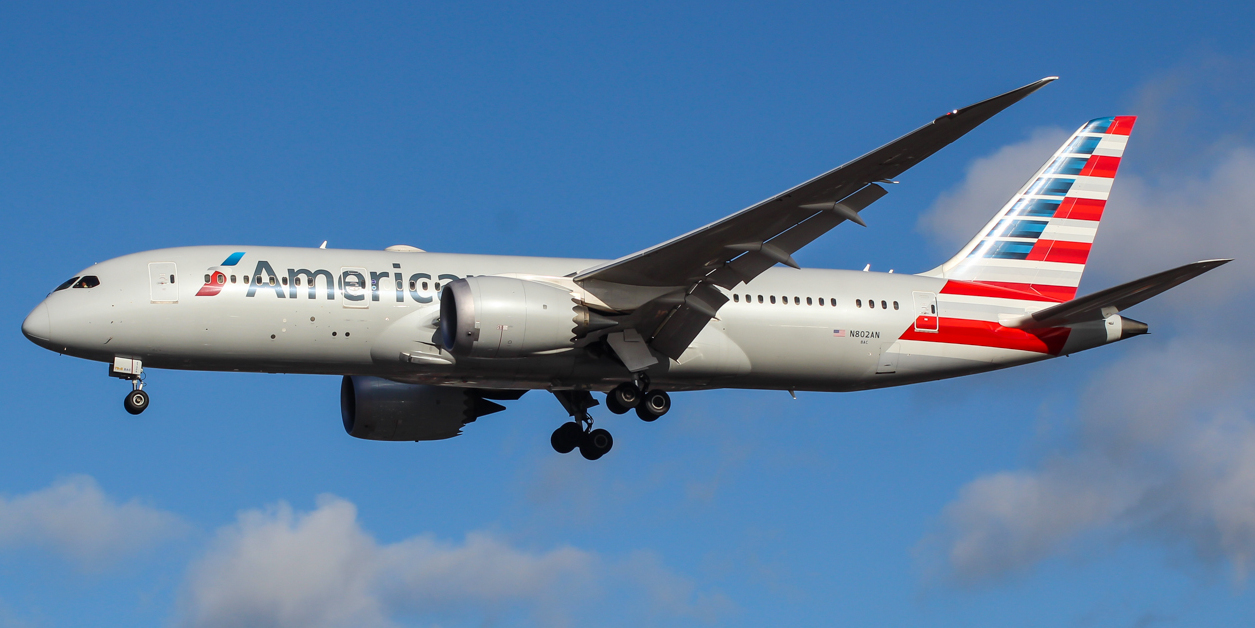
Boeing 787-8

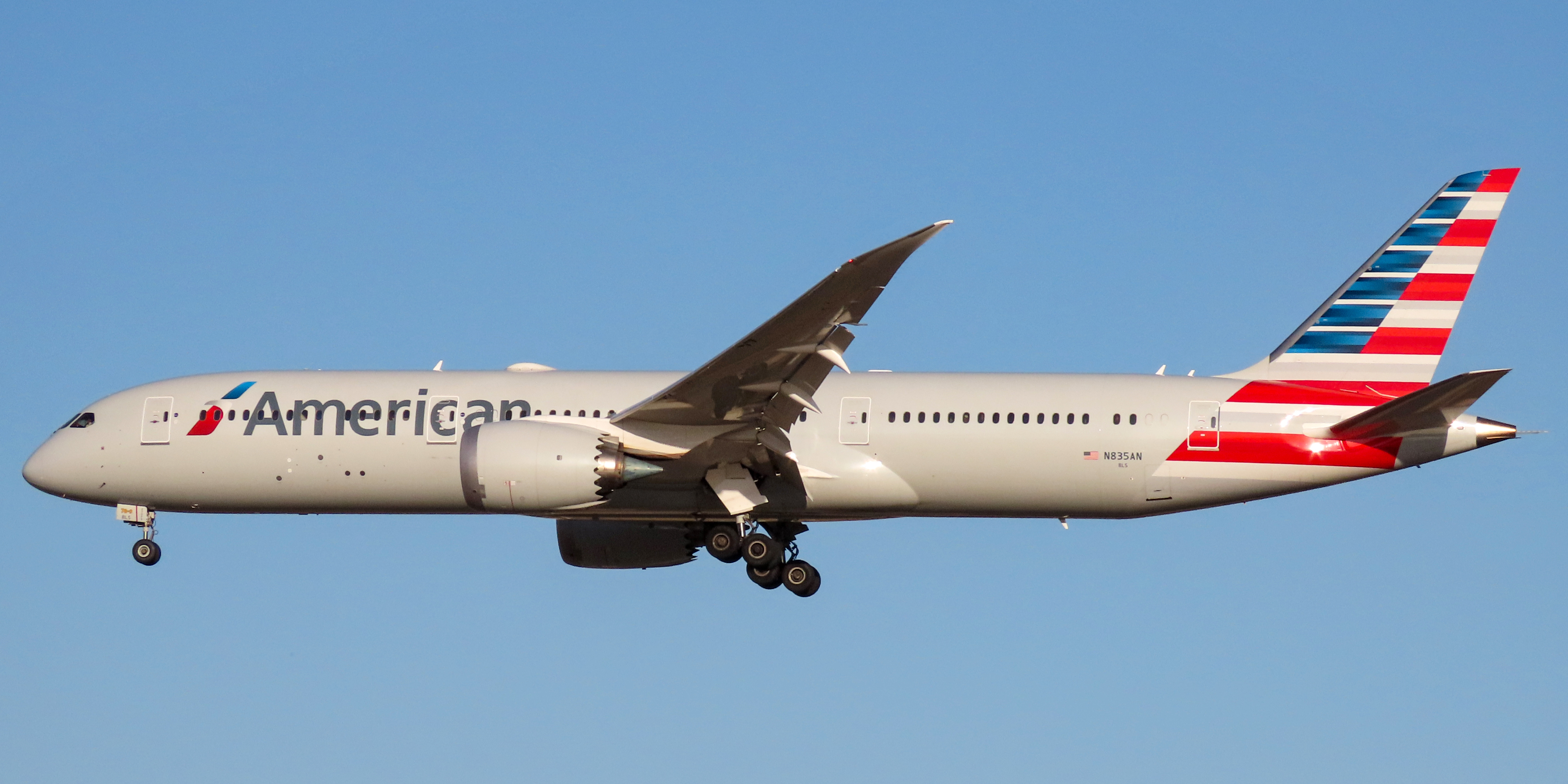
Boeing 787-9

== Fleet history ==
Retired American Airlines mainline fleet
Aircraft	Total	Introduced	Retired	Replacement	Notes	Refs
Jet aircraft
Airbus A300B4-600R	35	1988	2009	Airbus A330-200; Boeing 757-200; Boeing 767-300ER	One crashed as Flight 587.	
Airbus A330-200	15	2013	2020	Boeing 787-9	Former US Airways fleet. Retired early due to the COVID-19 pandemic.	
Airbus A330-300	9	2013	2020	Boeing 787-9	Former US Airways fleet. Retired early due to the COVID-19 pandemic.	
BAe 146-100	1	1987	1988	Unknown	Leased from British Aerospace.	
BAe 146-200	7	1987	1990	Unknown		
BAC 111-401AK	30	1965	1973	Unknown		
Boeing 707-120B	56	1959	1979	Unknown	Including 25 re-equipped with turbofans.	
Boeing 707-320B	10	1967	1981	Unknown		
Boeing 707-320C	34	1963	1981	Unknown		
Boeing 717-200	29	2001	2003	Unknown	Former Trans World Airlines fleet.	
Boeing 720B	25	1961	1975	Unknown	Including 10 re-equipped with turbofans.	
Boeing 727-100	59	1964	1994	Unknown	One crashed as Flight 625.	
Boeing 727-200	125	1968	2002	Boeing 737-800 (Since 1999); Boeing 757-200 (Since 1989)		
Boeing 737-100	2	1987	1988	Unknown	Former AirCal fleet.	
Boeing 737-200	21	1987	1991	Unknown	Former AirCal fleet.	
Boeing 737-300	8	1987	1992	Unknown	Former AirCal fleet.	
Boeing 737-400	14	2013	2014	Unknown	Former US Airways fleet. Never flew under American brand name.	
Boeing 747-100	9	1970	1985	McDonnell Douglas DC-10		
Boeing 747-200C	1	1984	1984	None	Leased from World Airways.	
Boeing 747SP	2	1986	1992	McDonnell Douglas MD-11		
Boeing 757-200	177	1989	2020	Airbus A321-200; Airbus A321neo; Airbus A321XLR	Retired early due to the COVID-19 pandemic. One crashed as Flight 965. One hijacked and crashed into The Pentagon as Flight 77, as part of the September 11 attacks. Former Trans World Airlines aircraft went to Delta Air Lines.	
Boeing 767-200	13	1982	2008	Boeing 767-300ER; Boeing 777-200ER		
Boeing 767-200ER	17	1984	2014	Airbus A321-200; Boeing 767-300ER	One hijacked and crashed into the North Tower of the World Trade Center as Flight 11, as part of the September 11 attacks.	
Boeing 767-200ER	10	2013	2015	Airbus A330-200	Former US Airways fleet. Never flew under American brand name.	
Boeing 767-300ER	67	1988	2020	Airbus A321XLR; Boeing 777-300ER; Boeing 787 Dreamliner	Retired early due to the COVID-19 pandemic. One unsuccessfully bombed as Flight 63. One written off as Flight 383.	
Convair 990	20	1962	1972	Unknown		
Douglas DC-8-54CF	3	1971	1972	Unknown	Former Trans Caribbean Airways fleet.	
Douglas DC-8-55CF	1	1971	1972	Unknown	Former Trans Caribbean Airways fleet.	
Douglas DC-8-61CF	3	1971	1971	Unknown	Former Trans Caribbean Airways fleet.	
Embraer 190	20	2013	2020	Airbus A319-100	Former US Airways fleet. Retired early due to the COVID-19 pandemic.	
Fokker 100	75	1991	2004	Bombardier CRJ700 series	World's largest fleet of the type. Retired early due to higher operating costs than American Eagle regional jets. One written off after 2001 landing gear collapse.	
McDonnell Douglas DC-10-10	55	1971	2000	Boeing 767-200ER (since 1986); Boeing 767-300ER (since 1989); McDonnell Douglas MD-11 (since 1992); Boeing 777-200ER (since 2000)	Operated the world's first scheduled DC-10 service (between Los Angeles and Chicago) on August 5, 1971. One damaged as Flight 96. One crashed as Flight 191. Two others were written off after non-fatal accidents.	
McDonnell Douglas DC-10-30	11	1981	2000	Boeing 767-200ER (since 1986); Boeing 767-300ER (since 1989); McDonnell Douglas MD-11 (since 1992); Boeing 777-200ER (since 2000)	Operated the world's first scheduled DC-10 service (between Los Angeles and Chicago) on August 5, 1971. One damaged as Flight 96. One crashed as Flight 191. Two others were written off after non-fatal accidents.	
McDonnell Douglas MD-11	19	1991	2001	Boeing 757-200; Boeing 767; Boeing 777-200ER		
McDonnell Douglas MD-82	270	1983	2019	Airbus A320 family Airbus A321neo; Boeing 737-800; Boeing 737 MAX	One crashed as Flight 1420. One donated to Lewis University in 2019.	
McDonnell Douglas MD-83	108	1987	2019	Airbus A320 family Airbus A321neo; Boeing 737-800; Boeing 737 MAX	One damaged as Flight 1572. One donated to George T. Baker Aviation School in 2010. One donated to Career Technology Center in 2019. Includes N984TW, the last McDonnell Douglas MD-80 ever built.	
McDonnell Douglas MD-87	5	1999	2003	Unknown	Former Reno Air fleet.	
McDonnell Douglas MD-90	5	1999	2005	Unknown	Former Reno Air fleet.	
Propeller aircraft
Bréguet 941	1	1969	1969	None	Sponsored trial of a pre-production aircraft in collaboration with McDonnell Douglas. Aircraft returned, none ordered.	
Convair CV-240	79	1948	1964	Douglas DC-6		
Convair CV-440 Metropolitan	5	1976	1982	Unknown	Operated by American Inter-Island Airlines for St. Thomas, U.S. Virgin Islands.	
Douglas DC-2	16	1934	1936	Unknown		
Douglas DC-3	113	1936	1955	Unknown	Operated the world's first scheduled DC-3 service (from Newark to Chicago) on June 26, 1936.	
Douglas DC-4	53	1946	1958	Unknown		
Douglas DC-6	88	1946	1966	BAC 111-401AK	One crashed as Flight 157.	
Douglas DC-7	58	1953	1967	Unknown		
Ford 5-AT-B Trimotor	NA	1929	NA	Unknown	C/N:39 tail number: NC9683 is on static display at the National Air and Space Museum.	
Lockheed L-188A Electra	35	1958	1972	Unknown		
