= McDonnell Douglas MD-11 =

Wide body airliner developed from the DC-10

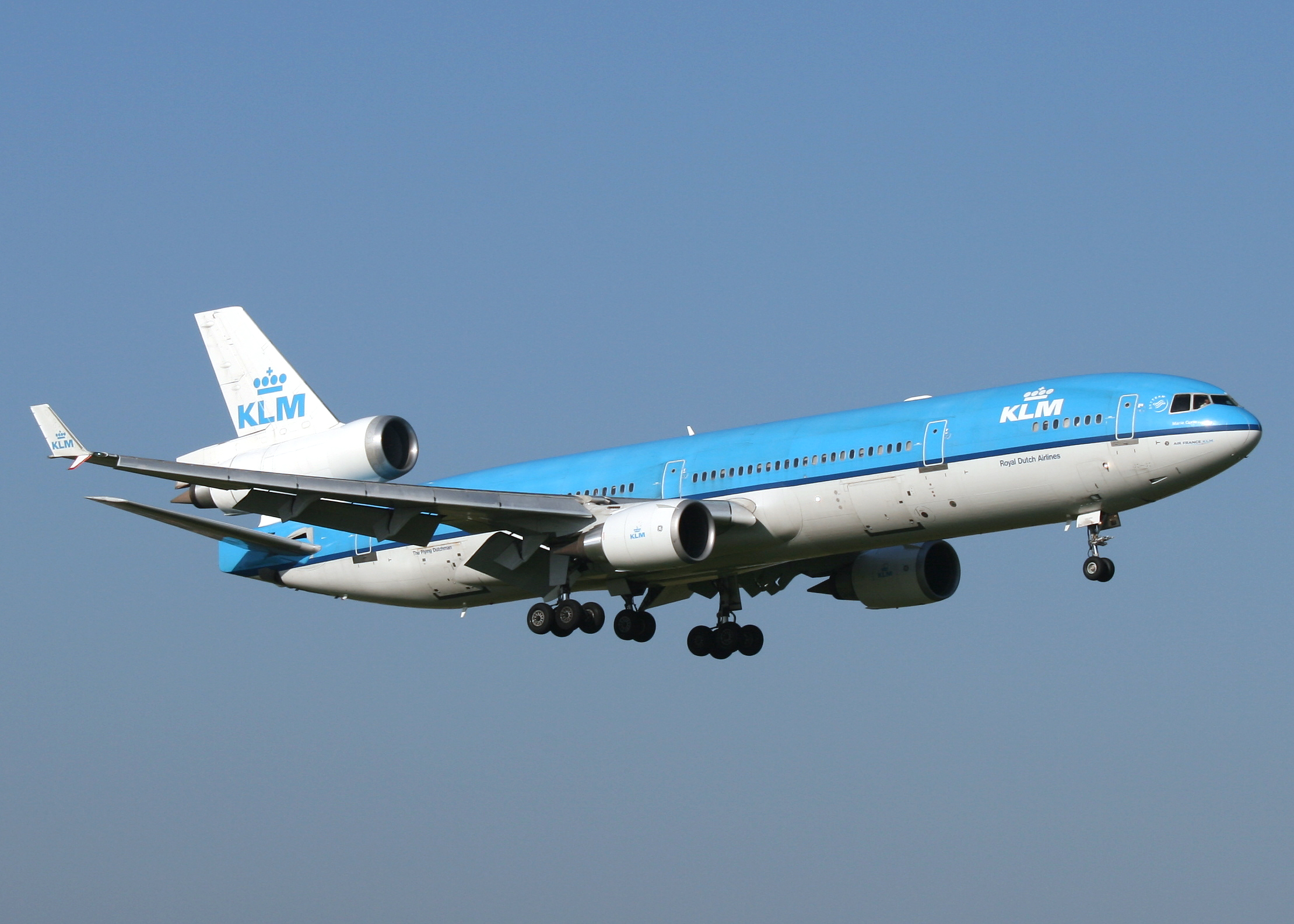
- An MD-11 of KLM, its last passenger operator, in 2008

General information
- Type: Wide-body jet airliner
- National origin: United States
- Manufacturer: McDonnell Douglas (1988–1997); Boeing Commercial Airplanes (1997–2000)
- Status: In cargo service
- Primary users: FedEx Express Western Global Airlines; UPS Airlines (historical); Lufthansa Cargo (historical)
- Number built: 200

History
- Manufactured: 1988–2000
- Introduction date: December 20, 1990, with Finnair
- First flight: January 10, 1990
- Retired: October 26, 2014 (passenger service)
- Developed from: McDonnell Douglas DC-10

The McDonnell Douglas MD-11 is an American trijet wide-body airliner which was manufactured by McDonnell Douglas and later by Boeing. The MD-11 is the largest trijet ever built.

Following DC-10 development studies, the MD-11 program was launched on December 30, 1986. Assembly of the first prototype began on March 9, 1988. Its maiden flight occurred on January 10, 1990, and it achieved Federal Aviation Administration (FAA) certification on November 8. The first delivery was to Finnair on December 7 and it entered service on December 20, 1990.

It retains the basic trijet configuration of the DC-10 with updated General Electric CF6-80C2 or Pratt & Whitney PW4000 turbofan engines. Its wingspan is slightly larger than the DC-10 and it has winglets. Its maximum takeoff weight (MTOW) is increased by 14% to 630,500 lb (286 t). Its fuselage is stretched by 11% to 202 ft (61.6 m) to accommodate 298 passengers in three classes over a range of up to 7,130 nautical miles [nmi] (13,200 km; 8,210 mi). It features a glass cockpit that eliminates the need for a flight engineer.

Originally positioned as a longer-range alternative to rival twinjets, the existing Boeing 767 and the upcoming Boeing 777 and Airbus A330, the MD-11 initially failed to meet its range and fuel burn targets, which impacted its sales despite a performance improvement program. McDonnell Douglas's financial struggles prevented further development of the MD-11 before it was acquired by Boeing in 1997; the unified company decided to terminate the MD-11 program after filling outstanding orders due to internal competition from Boeing's own 767 and 777. Only 200 units were built, of which roughly a quarter were freight aircraft, and production concluded in October 2000. In November 2014, KLM ended the world's last remaining MD-11 passenger flights. Many of the MD-11 passenger fleet were converted to freighter specification, and many remain in service as of 2026.

== Development ==
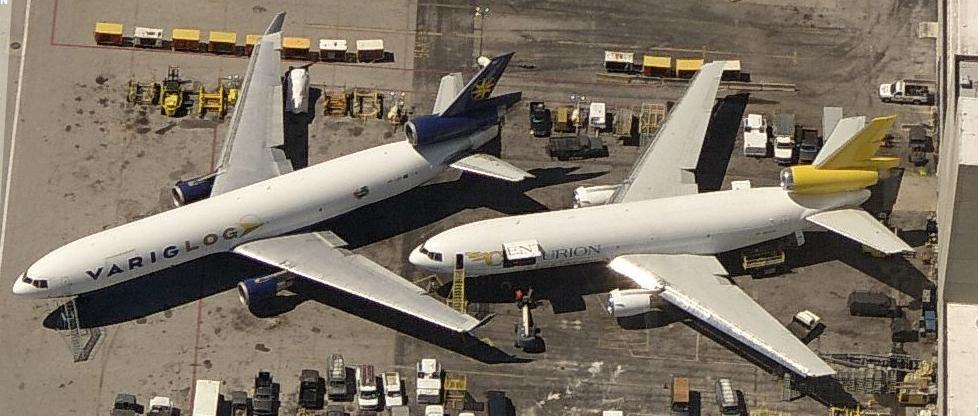
The MD-11 on the left is 202 ft (61.6 m) long and has winglets and a smaller tailplane while the DC-10 on the right is 181.6 ft (55.35 m) long.

=== Origins ===
Although the MD-11 program was launched in 1986, McDonnell Douglas had started to search for a DC-10 derivative as early as 1976. Two versions were considered then: a DC-10-10 with a fuselage stretch of 40 feet (12 m) and a DC-10-30 stretched by 30 feet (9 m). The latter version would have been capable of transporting up to 340 passengers in a multi-class configuration, or 277 passengers and their luggage over 5,300 nautical miles (9,800 km; 6,100 mi). At the same time, the manufacturer was seeking to reduce wing and engine drag on the trijet. Another version of the aircraft was also envisaged, the "DC-10 global", aimed to counter the risks of loss of orders for the DC-10-30 that the Boeing 747SP and its range were causing. The DC-10 global would have incorporated more fuel tanks.

While continuing their research for a new aircraft, McDonnell Douglas designated the program DC-10 Super 60, previously known for a short time as DC-10 Super 50. The Super 60 was to be an intercontinental aircraft incorporating many aerodynamic improvements in the wings, and a fuselage lengthened by 26 feet 8 inches (8.13 m) to allow for up to 350 passengers to be seated in a mixed-class layout, compared to 275 in the same configuration of the DC-10.

Following more refinements, in 1979 the DC-10 Super 60 was proposed in three distinct versions like the DC-8. The DC-10-61 was designed to be a high-capacity medium-range aircraft. It would have a fuselage stretch of 40 feet (12 m) over the earlier DC-10 models, enabling it to carry 390 passengers in a mixed class or 550 passengers in an all-economy layout, similar to Boeing's later 777-300 and Airbus A340-600. Like the DC-8, the series 62 was proposed for long-range routes. It would feature a more modest fuselage stretch of 26 ft 7 in (8.10 m), along with an increased wingspan and fuel capacity. It would be capable of carrying up to 350 passengers (mixed class) or 440 passengers (all-economy), similar to the later Boeing 777-200 or the Airbus A330-300/A340-300/500. Finally, the series 63 would have incorporated the same fuselage as the DC-10-61 as well as the larger wing of the -62. After high-profile accidents in the 1970s, such as Turkish Airlines Flight 981 and American Airlines Flight 191, the trijet's reputation was seriously damaged by doubts regarding its structural integrity. For these reasons, and due to a downturn in the airline industry, all work on the Super 60 was stopped.

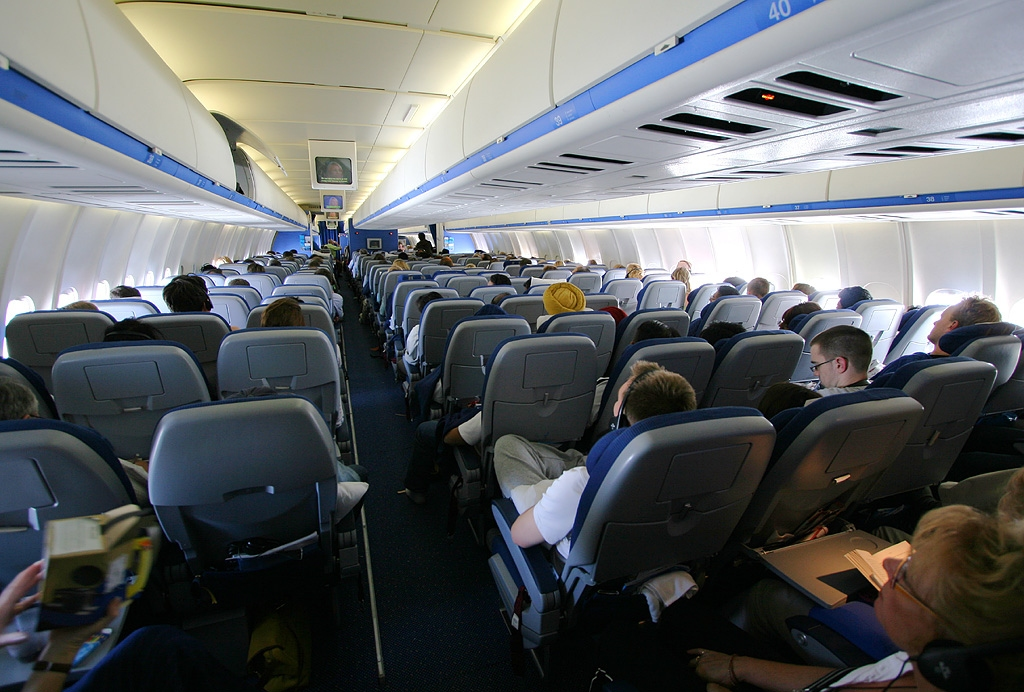
Nine-abreast economy class

In August 1981, a Continental Airlines DC-10-10 (registration number N68048) was leased to conduct more research, particularly on the effects the newly designed winglets would have on aircraft performance. Different types of winglets were tested during that time in conjunction with NASA at the McDonnell Douglas flight test facility in Yuma, Arizona and Edwards Air Force Base. McDonnell Douglas was again planning new DC-10 versions that could incorporate winglets and more efficient engines developed at the time by Pratt & Whitney (PW2037) and Rolls-Royce (RB.211-535E4). The manufacturer finally rationalized all these studies under the MD-EEE (Ecology-Economy-Efficiency) designation, which was later modified to the MD-100 following some more changes. The MD-100 was proposed in two versions: the Series 10, having an airframe shorter by 6 ft 6 in (1.98 m) compared to the DC-10 and seating up to 270 passengers in a mixed-class configuration; and the Series 20, incorporating a fuselage stretch of 20 ft 6 in (6.25 m) over the DC-10 and able to seat up to 333 passengers in the same kind of configuration as the Series 10. Both versions could be powered by the same engine families as the actual MD-11 plus the RB.211-600. However, the situation for the manufacturer, and the airline industry in general, did not look bright. No new DC-10 orders were received, and many observers and customers doubted that the manufacturer would stay in business much longer. Thus, the board of directors decided in November 1983 to once again cease all work on the projected new trijet.

The following year no new orders for the DC-10 were received. The production line was kept active thanks to earlier orders from the United States Air Force for 60 KC-10A tankers. McDonnell Douglas was still convinced that a new derivative for the DC-10 was needed, as shown by the second-hand market for their Series 30 and the heavier DC-10-30ER version. Thus, in 1984 a new derivative aircraft version of the DC-10 was designated MD-11. From the very beginning, the MD-11X was conceived in two different versions. The MD-11X-10, based on a DC-10-30 airframe, offered a range of 6,500 nautical miles (12,000 km; 7,500 mi) with passengers. That first version would have had a maximum takeoff weight (MTOW) of 580,000 pounds (260,000 kg) and would have used CF6-80C2 or PW4000 engines. The MD-11X-20 was to have a longer fuselage, accommodating up to 331 passengers in a mixed-class layout, and a range of 6,000 nautical miles (11,000 km; 6,900 mi).

As more orders for the DC-10 were received, McDonnell Douglas used the time gained before the end of DC-10 production to consult with potential customers and to refine the proposed new trijet. In July 1985, the board of directors authorized the Long Beach plant to offer the MD-11 to potential customers. At the time, the aircraft was still proposed in two versions, both with the same fuselage length, a stretch of 22 ft 3 in (6.78 m) over the DC-10 airframe, as well as the same engine choice as the MD-11X. One version would have a range of 4,780 nautical miles (8,850 km; 5,500 mi) with a gross weight of 500,000 pounds (230,000 kg) and transport up to 337 passengers, while the second would carry 331 passengers over 6,900 nautical miles (12,800 km; 7,900 mi). A year later, as several airlines had committed to the MD-11, the situation was looking optimistic. The aircraft was now a 320-seater baseline and defined as an 18 ft 7 in (5.66 m) stretch over the DC-10-30 powered by the new advanced turbofans offered by the major engine manufacturers giving it a range of 6,800 nautical miles (12,600 km; 7,800 mi). Other versions, such as a shortened ER with a range of 7,500 nautical miles (13,900 km; 8,600 mi), an all-cargo offering a maximum payload of 200,970 pounds (91,160 kg), and a Combi with a provision for ten freight pallets on the main deck, were proposed. Further growth of the aircraft was also foreseen, such as the MD-11 Advanced.

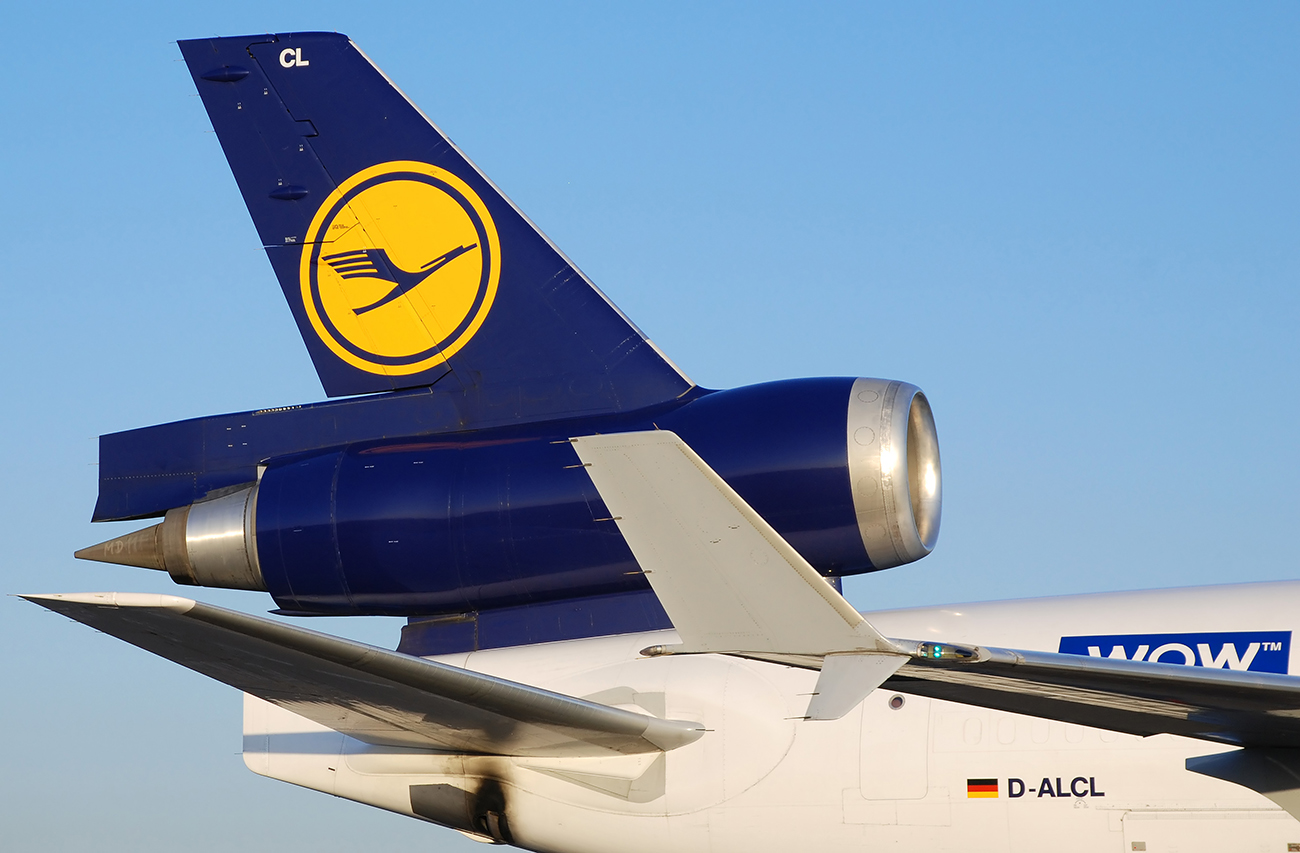
The MD-11 has a center engine at the base of the vertical stabilizer, like the DC-10. Additionally, the nacelle has a bulge at the front, similar to the DC-10-40 variant.

The limited innovation in the MD-11's design has been attributed to McDonnell Douglas's declining cash flow, as the company faced problems with military contracts and reduced demand for its commercial aircraft. With constrained financial resources, the MD-11 was developed as an updated version of the DC-10 rather than an all-new design. During the same period, competitors Airbus and Boeing launched clean-sheet aircraft that became the Airbus A330/A340 and Boeing 777. As a trijet, the MD-11 was less fuel-efficient, but McDonnell Douglas promoted it as offering greater range than contemporary twinjet widebodies such as the Boeing 767 and the forthcoming Airbus A330 and Boeing 777. Aerospace consultant Scott Hamilton described the MD-11 in 2014 as "classically ill-timed", noting that it entered service "at the end of the three- or four-engine era, just ahead of the real move to ETOPS with the 777", and that it was produced by "a dying company that no longer could meet promises." At the time of its introduction, sales were hampered by doubts about McDonnell Douglas's long-term viability." The company's strategy to "outsource everything but design, final assembly, and flight testing and sales of the MD-11" was also cited as a factor contributing to the decline of its commercial aircraft business.

=== Launch and costs ===
On December 30, 1986, McDonnell Douglas launched the MD-11 with commitments for 52 firm orders and 40 options in three different versions (passenger, combi and freighter) from ten airlines (Alitalia, British Caledonian, Dragonair, Federal Express, Finnair, Korean Air, Scandinavian Airlines, Swissair, Thai Airways International, and VARIG) and two leasing companies (Guinness Peat Aviation and Mitsui). Orders from Dragonair, Scandinavian, and UTA, an undisclosed customer, were canceled by 1988.

In 1987, the program was to cost $1.5 billion (equivalent to $3.64 billion in 2025) with $500 million for development and almost $1 billion for tooling and inventory. The first 52 firm orders totaled $5 billion, or $95 million each, while the A340 sold for $67 million. At certification in 1990, $2.5 billion were invested in initial production inventory, and $700 million for engineering, tools, and flight testing. While it was selling for $100 million, the initial MD-11 jets cost $120 to $150 million to produce but this was to reduce to $90 million with manufacturing experience over the program life for an 11% gross profit margin, less than the 15% to 20% Boeing obtains.

In 1992, the $1.7 billion development cost was to be spread over the first 301 aircraft produced for $100 million each. In 1995, because costs and revenues could not be reasonably estimated over the program life, McDonnell Douglas took a pre-tax charge of $1.838 billion (~$3.54 billion in 2025) for deferred production costs and for reduced support and tooling value. In 1999, the unit cost was $132-$147.5 million (equivalent to $240-$267.6 million in 2025 dollars).

=== Production and performance issues ===
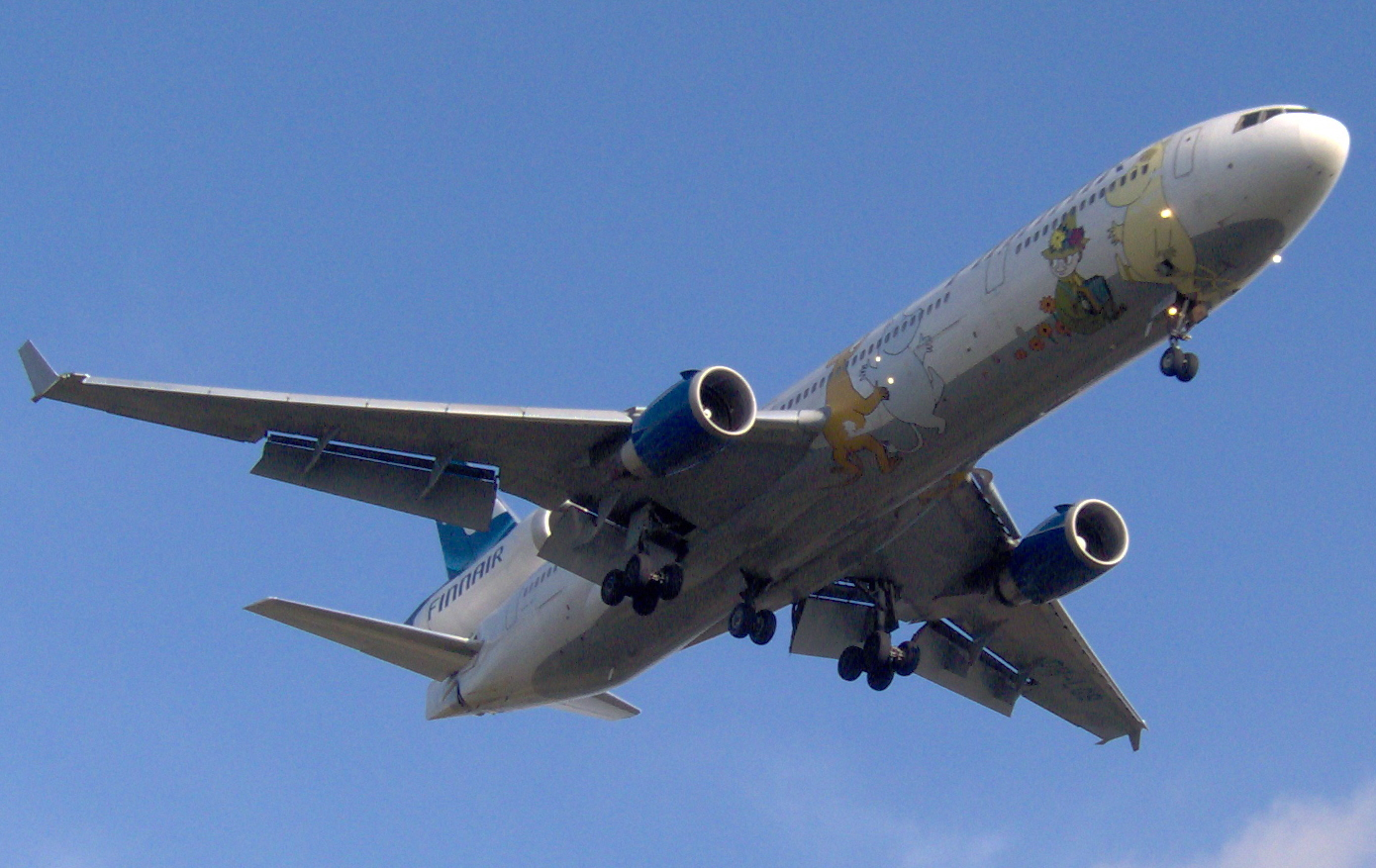
The first MD-11 was delivered to Finnair on December 7, 1990, and made its first revenue on December 20, 1990.

Assembly of the first MD-11 began on March 9, 1988, at McDonnell Douglas's Douglas Products Division in Long Beach, California, with the fuselage and wings joined in October that year. The first flight was originally scheduled for March 1989, but manufacturing issues, supplier delays, and labor disputes postponed the prototype's ceremonial rollout until September.

Parts for the MD-11 were sourced from a global network of subcontractors and suppliers. Subassembly work was distributed across McDonnell Douglas facilities: the nose section was produced in St. Louis, Missouri; control surfaces in Tulsa, Oklahoma; wings in Malton, Ontario, Canada; and structural rings in Torrance, California. Main fuselage sections for the MD-11—and previously for the DC-10 and KC-10—were built by General Dynamics' Convair Division in San Diego. These sections were transported by barge to the Port of Long Beach and then by truck to the final assembly plant.

In the following months of 1989, the prototype was prepared for its maiden flight, which took place on January 10, 1990. The first two aircraft built were intended for FedEx and were already fitted with forward side cargo doors. They remained with McDonnell Douglas as test aircraft until 1991, when they were fully converted to freighters and delivered to the airline. FAA certification was granted on November 8, 1990, while the European Joint Aviation Authorities (JAA) certified the MD-11 on October 17, 1991, after approximately 200 issues were resolved. Yugoslav Airlines, already operating several DC-10s, was to be the first customer, but three aircraft produced for the airline were never delivered due to the Yugoslav Wars. The first MD-11 was delivered to Finnair on December 7, 1990, and entered revenue service on December 20, flying from Helsinki to Tenerife in the Canary Islands. In the United States, Delta Air Lines introduced MD-11 service the following year.

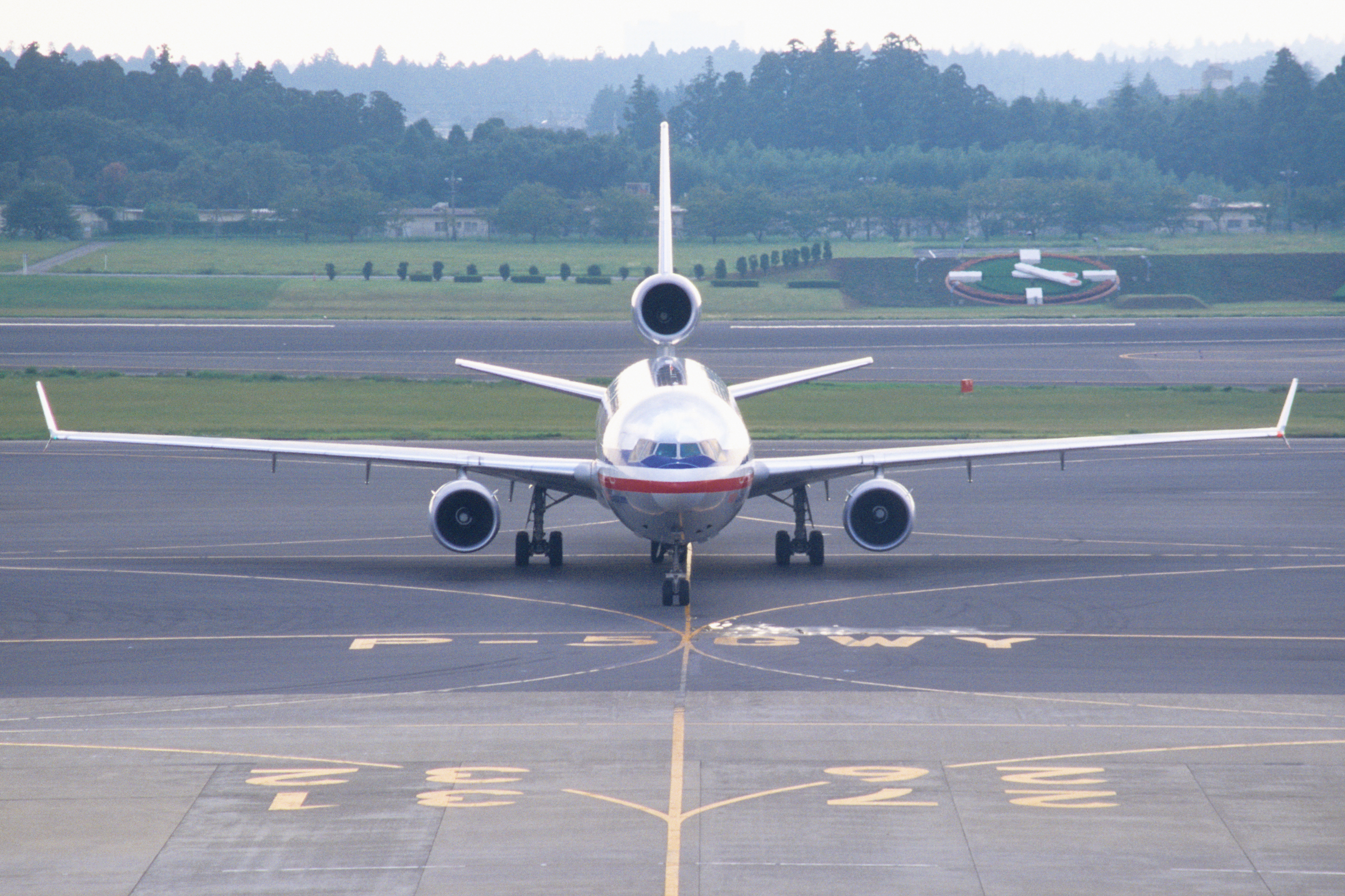
American Airlines MD-11 front view

During this period, shortcomings in the MD-11's performance became apparent, as the aircraft failed to meet its advertised range and fuel-burn targets. American Airlines in particular was unimpressed with the 19 aircraft it received, and Singapore Airlines canceled its order for 20 MD-11s, opting instead for 20 Airbus A340-300s. American cited problems with engine and airframe performance, while Singapore Airlines stated that the MD-11 could not operate its long-haul routes as planned. Pre-flight estimates indicated that the Pratt & Whitney–powered MD-11 would have a range of 7,000 nautical miles (13,000 km; 8,100 mi) with a 61,000-pound (28 t) payload. With the Phase 1 drag reduction package implemented, the aircraft could only achieve this range with a 48,500-pound (22 t) payload, or a reduced range of 6,493 nautical miles (12,025 km; 7,472 mi) at full payload.

In 1990, McDonnell Douglas launched the Performance Improvement Program (PIP) in partnership with Pratt & Whitney, General Electric, and NASA's Langley Research Center to improve the MD-11's weight, fuel capacity, engine performance, and aerodynamics. The PIP continued through 1995 and succeeded in recovering some of the aircraft's lost range. However, the improvements were insufficient for certain long-haul routes; in 1995, American Airlines sold its 19 MD-11s to FedEx after determining that even the upgraded aircraft could not operate the Dallas–Hong Kong route as planned.

Despite the PIP, sales of the MD-11 had already been significantly impacted. Prospective customers instead ordered twinjet widebodies such as the Boeing 767 and 777 or the Airbus A330 in large numbers. These aircraft later gained extended-range variants—the 767-300ER, 777-200ER, and A330-200—that eliminated the MD-11's remaining range advantage over earlier versions while maintaining higher fuel efficiency than both the trijet MD-11 and the quadjet Airbus A340. Airbus, which initially achieved only slightly better success with the A340-200 and -300 than McDonnell Douglas did with the MD-11, proceeded to develop the next-generation A340-500 and -600 to further differentiate the model from the A330-200. Boeing followed suit with the second-generation 777-300ER and 777-200LR, which proved more commercially successful.

McDonnell Douglas explored a follow-on design, the MD-XX, which would have included the stretched MD-XX Stretch and long-range MD-XX LR variants. However, the program was deemed too costly for the financially troubled company and was canceled before development began.

Following McDonnell Douglas's merger with Boeing in 1997, the combined company decided to limit MD-11 production to freighter variants to avoid internal competition with the Boeing 767 and 777. In 1998, Boeing announced the end of MD-11 production after fulfilling existing orders due to insufficient market demand. The final passenger MD-11 was delivered to Sabena in April 1998. Assembly of the last two MD-11s was completed in August and October 2000 and delivered to Lufthansa Cargo on February 22 and January 25, 2001, respectively. McDonnell Douglas had originally projected sales of more than 300 aircraft, but only 200 were built.

The former MD-11 assembly plant in Long Beach, California, became a Boeing facility and was used to manufacture aircraft until November 29, 2015.

== Design ==
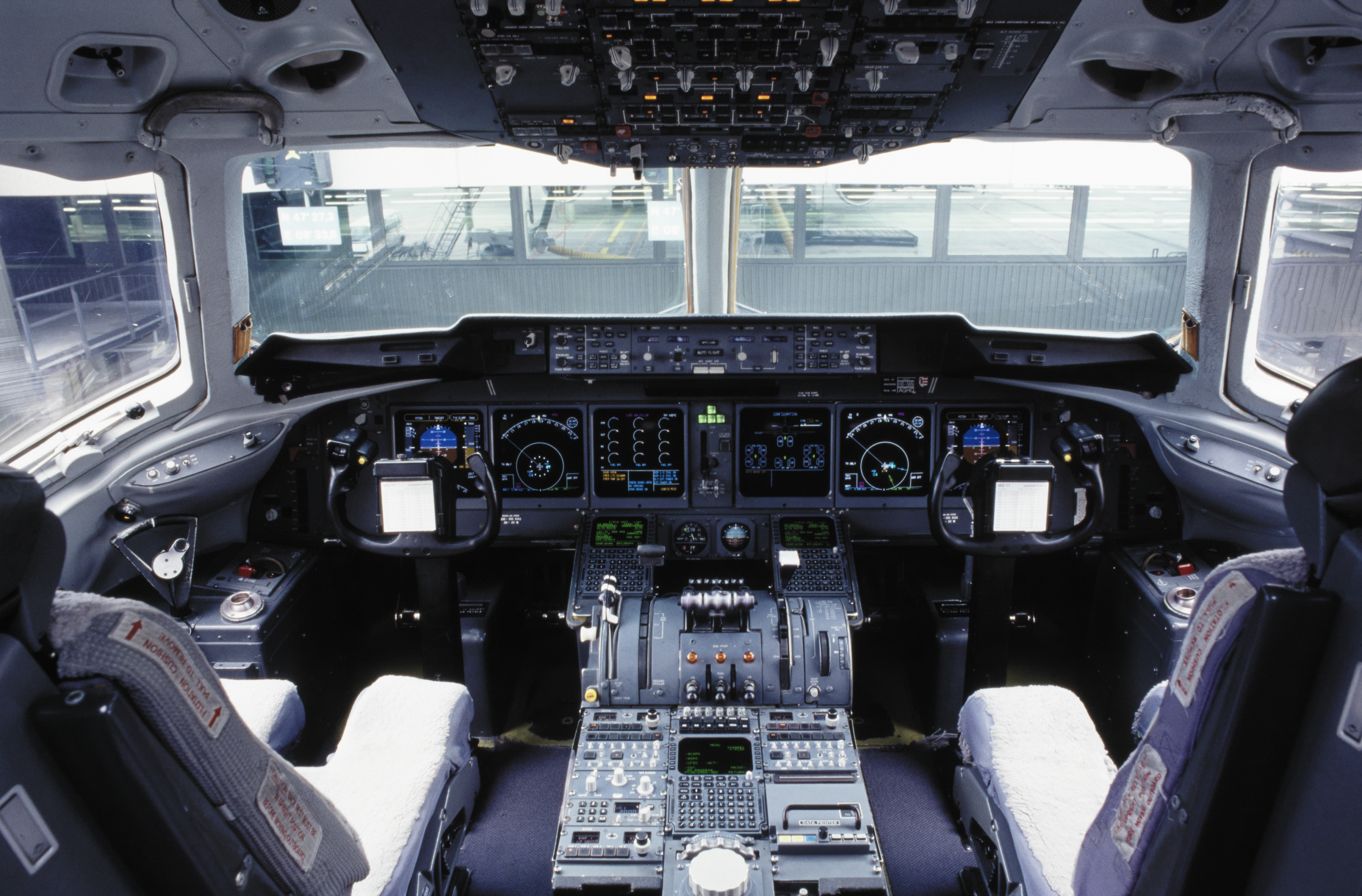
Two-crew glass cockpit

The MD-11 is a medium- to long-range widebody airliner, with two engines mounted on underwing pylons and a third engine at the base of the vertical stabilizer, which has a two-segment rudder for directional control. It is based on the DC-10 but features a stretched fuselage, increased wingspan winglets, refined airfoils on the wing and tailplane resulting in a reduced wetted area and form drag, new engines, and increased use of composites. The most significant change in the tail section is the MD-11's horizontal tail being 30% smaller than that of the DC-10-30. The horizontal tail area on the DC-10 is 1,338 square feet (120 square meters), while on the MD-11, it's reduced to 920 square feet (82.8 square meters). The MD11's winglets are credited with improving fuel efficiency by about 2.5%. The MD-11 has a smaller empennage than the DC-10 it is based upon.

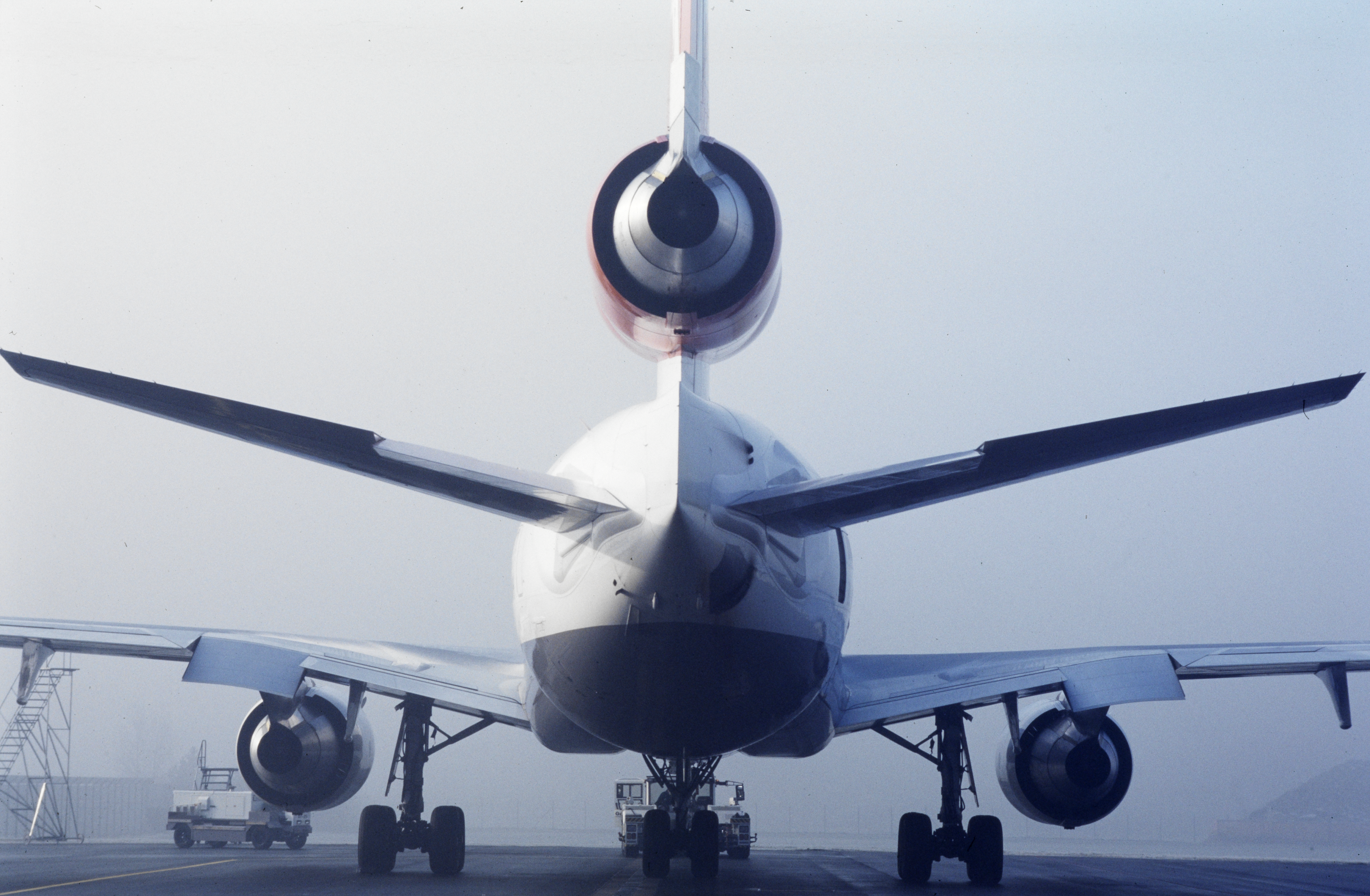
Tail view of MD-11 of Swissair at Zurich airport

The MD-11 features a two-crew cockpit that incorporates six 8-inch interchangeable cathode-ray tube (CRT) display units and advanced Honeywell VIA 2000 computers. The cockpit design is called Advanced Common Flightdeck (ACF) and is shared with the Boeing 717. Flight deck features include an Electronic Instrument System, a dual Flight Management System, a Central Fault Display System, and a Global Positioning System. Category IIIB automatic landing capability for bad-weather operations and Future Air Navigation Systems (FANS) are available.

The MD-11 had a neutral stability design and one of the first commercial designs to employ a computer-assisted pitch/longitudinal stability augmentation system (LSAS) that featured a fuel ballast tank in the tailplane, and a partly computer-driven horizontal stabilizer, to compensate for the comparatively short horizontal stabilizer. Updates to the software package made the airplane's handling characteristics in manual flight similar to those of the DC-10, despite a smaller tailplane to reduce drag and increase fuel efficiency.

The MD-11 incorporates hydraulic fuses not included in the initial DC-10 design, to prevent catastrophic loss of control in the event of a hydraulic failure such as that which occurred on United Airlines Flight 232.

== Variants ==
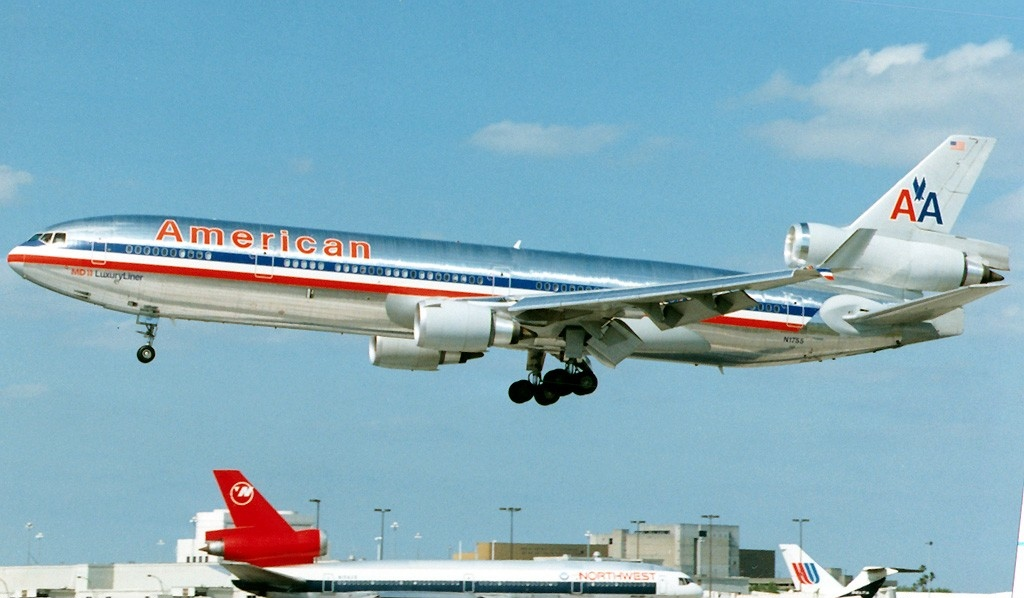
American Airlines received 19 passenger MD-11s.

The MD-11 was manufactured in five variants.

- MD-11 (131 built): the passenger variant, was produced from 1988 to 1998. It was the first version on offer at the aircraft's launch in 1986 and was delivered to American Airlines (19), Delta Air Lines (17), Swissair (16), Japan Airlines (10), KLM (10), and other airlines with fewer aircraft.
- MD-11C (5 built): this combi aircraft was the third variant on offer at launch in 1986 and was designed to accommodate both passengers and freight on the main deck, which featured a rear cargo compartment for up to ten pallets, each measuring 88 by 125 inches (2.2 m × 3.2 m) or 96 by 125 inches (2.4 m × 3.2 m). The main deck cargo compartment was accessible by a large rear port-side cargo door, which measured 160 by 102 inches (4.1 m × 2.6 m). The main deck cargo volume was 10,904 cubic feet (308.8 m^{3}). Additional freight was also carried in below-deck compartments. The MD-11C could also be configured as an all-passenger aircraft. All five aircraft were manufactured between 1991 and 1992 and delivered to Alitalia, the only customer for that variant. In 2005 and 2006 the airline converted them to full-freighter configurations to be operated by Alitalia's cargo division. Following that division's closure, the five aircraft were returned to their lessor in January 2009.

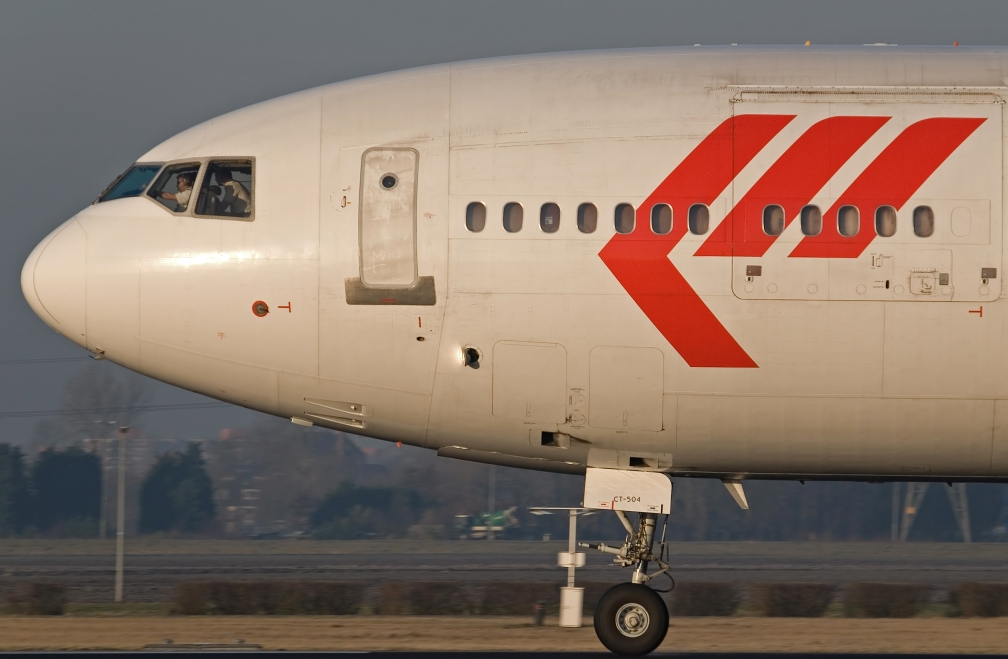
Martinair MD-11CF front section with forward cargo door and windows

- MD-11CF (6 built): the Convertible Freighter variant was launched in 1991 by an order from Martinair for three aircraft plus two options. The MD-11CF features a large forward port-side cargo door (140 by 102 inches (3.6 m × 2.6 m)) located between the first two passenger doors and can be used in an all-passenger or in an all-cargo configuration. As a freighter, it can transport 26 pallets of the same dimensions (88 by 125 inches (2.2 m × 3.2 m)) or 96 by 125 inches (2.4 m × 3.2 m)) as for the MD-11C and MD-11F for a main-deck cargo volume of 14,508 cubic feet (410.8 m^{3}) and offers a maximum payload of 196,928 pounds (89,325 kg). All six MD-11CFs were delivered to Martinair (four) and World Airways (two) in 1995. The two World Airways aircraft were converted to freight-only in 2002.
- MD-11ER (5 built): the Extended Range version was launched by the manufacturer at the Singapore Air Show in February 1994. The MD-11ER incorporates all the Performance Improvement Program (PIP) options, including a maximum takeoff weight of 630,500 pounds (286,000 kg) and an extra fuel tank of 3,000 US gallons (11,000 L; 2,500 imp gal)) in the forward cargo hold to offer a range of 7,240 nautical miles (13,410 km; 8,330 mi), an increase of 400 nautical miles (740 km; 460 mi) over the standard passenger variant. MD-11ERs were delivered between 1995 and 1997 to Garuda Indonesia (three) and World Airways (two). As of February 2007, only one Finnair MD-11ER has been converted to MD-11 with the removal of the extra fuel tank.

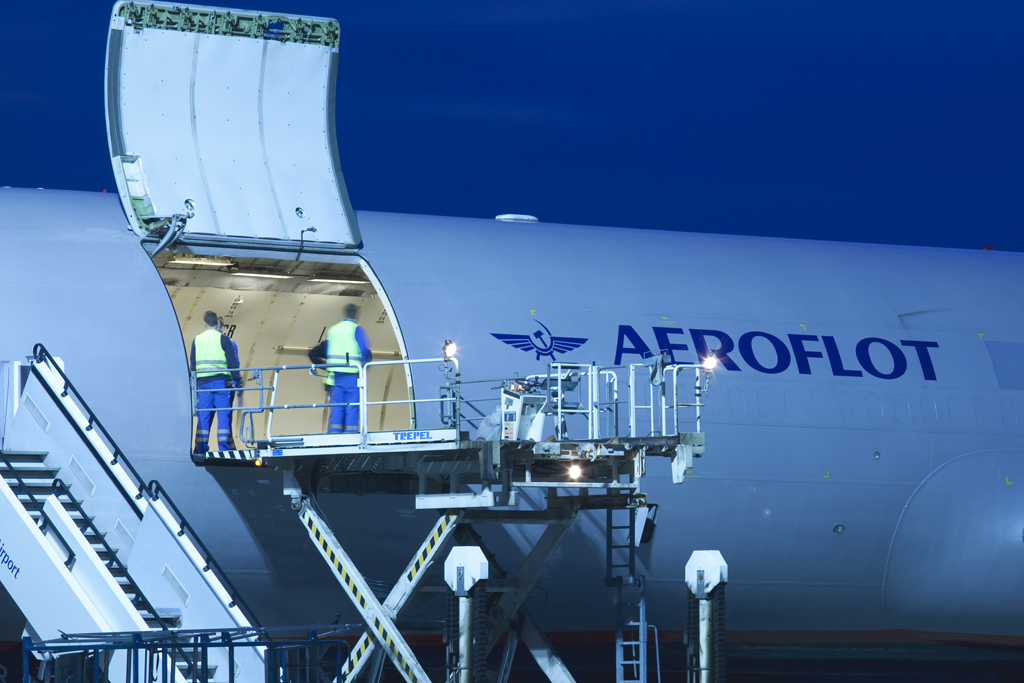
Aeroflot MD-11F cargo door loading

- MD-11F (53 built): The freight transport aircraft was the second variant on offer at launch in 1986 and was the last and longest (1988–2000) manufactured version. The all-cargo aircraft features the same forward port-side cargo door (140 by 102 inches (3.6 m × 2.6 m)) as the MD-11CF, a main-deck volume of 15,530 cubic feet (440 m^{3}), a maximum payload of 200,151 pounds (90,787 kg) and can transport 26 pallets of the same dimensions (88 by 125 inches (2.2 m × 3.2 m) or 96 by 125 inches (2.4 m × 3.2 m)) as for the MD-11C and MD-11CF. The MD-11F was delivered between 1991 and 2001 to FedEx Express (22), Lufthansa Cargo (14), and other airlines with fewer aircraft.
- MD-11 BCF (Boeing Converted Freighter): Boeing and its group of international affiliates offer a conversion of used passenger airliners into freighters. The MD-11BCF is one of the models offered.

Note: Some or all the features of the MD-11ER, including the higher MTOW of 630,500 pounds (286.0 t), part or all of the PIPs aerodynamic improvements packages and composite panels were fitted to later-built MD-11s (except the extra fuel tank), and could be retrofitted to any of the variants, except for the PIP Phase IIIB larger aft-engine intake. Some airlines, such as Finnair, Martinair, and FedEx have made the structural changes required to allow their aircraft to have the higher MTOW. Swissair's 16 newest aircraft were retrofitted with all the features except for the extra fuel tank and were so-designated MD-11AH for Advanced Heavy.

=== Proposed tanker version ===
After McDonnell Douglas did the KDC-10 conversion for the Royal Netherlands Air Force (RNAF) in 1992, they proposed a tanker/transport version of the MD-11CF which had the in-house designation KMD-11. McDonnell Douglas offered either conversion of second-hand aircraft (KMD-11) or new built aircraft (KC-10B), the proposed KMD-11 offered 35,000 pounds (16,000 kg) more cargo capacity and 8,400 pounds (3,800 kg) more transferable fuel than the KC-10A. It was offered to the RNAF and Royal Saudi Air Force in the 1990s and the Royal Australian Air Force in the early 2000s. However, no aircraft were purchased.

=== Undeveloped variants ===
In 1993, 1995, and again in 1996, McDonnell Douglas performed studies on the feasibility of a twin-engine jet using MD-11 components, but nothing came of any of them. In August 1997, just after the merger with Boeing, a presentation was made pitching an MD-11 twin with a new Boeing wing to fill the gap between the 767 and the 777, but again the proposal came to nothing, as it had nothing in common with other Boeing airliners in terms of production nor pilot type rating.

After ending the MD-12 program, McDonnell Douglas focused on 300–400-seat MD-11 derivatives. At the 1996 Farnborough International Air Show, the company presented plans for a new tri-jet with high seating and long range named "MD-XX". It was offered in the MD-XX Stretch and MD-XX LR versions. The MD-XX Stretch version was to have a longer fuselage than the MD-11 and seat 375 in a typical three-class arrangement. The MD-XX LR was to have a longer range and be the same length as the MD-11; it was to have typical three-class seating for 309. However, the McDonnell Douglas board of directors decided to end the MD-XX program in October 1996, because the financial investment was too large for the company.

== Operators ==
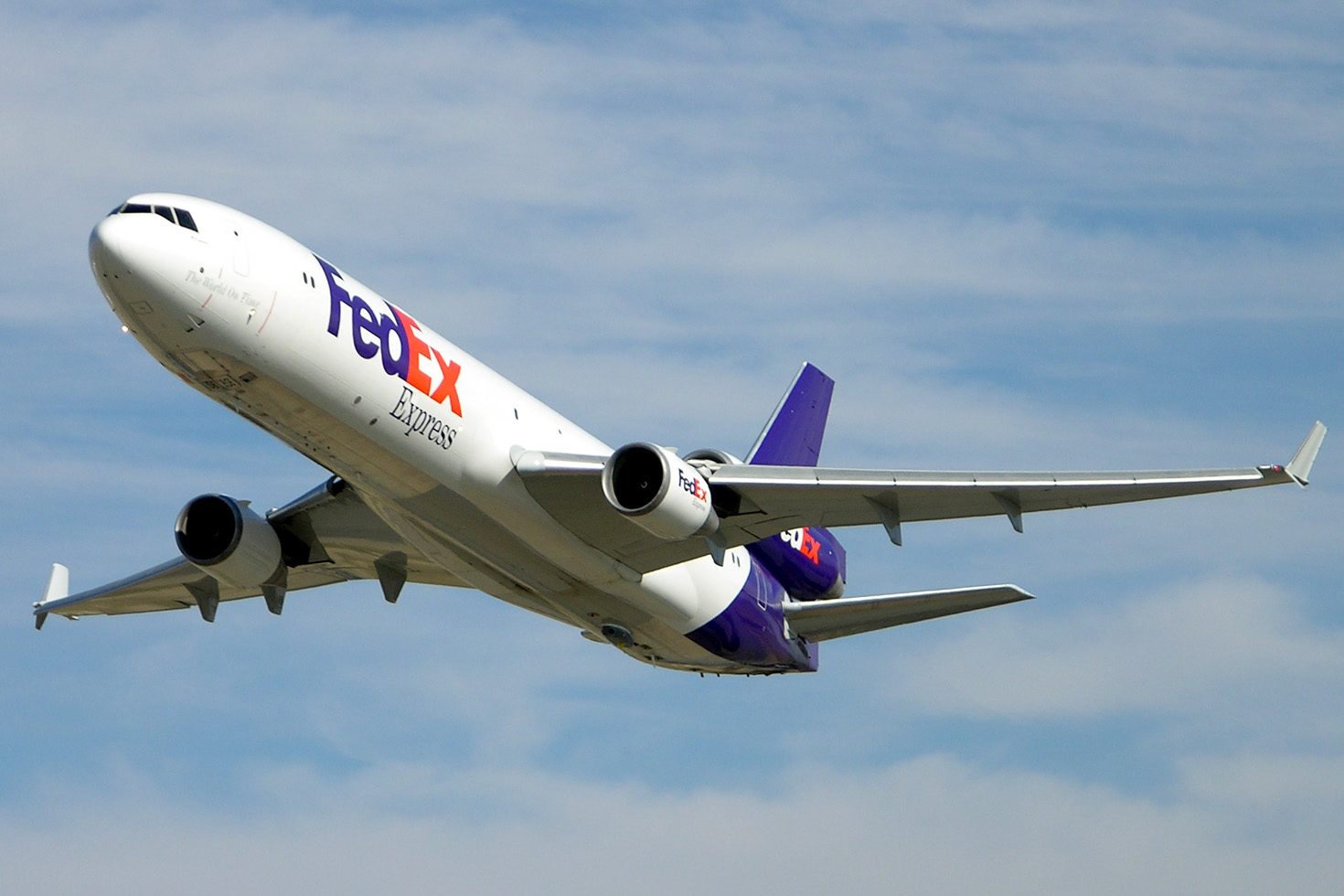
An MD-11 operated by FedEx Express

As of November 2025, immediately before the crash of UPS Airlines Flight 2976, 51 remained operational with FedEx (26), UPS (22) and Western Global Airlines (3). Following the Louisville crash, UPS Airlines permanently retired its entire MD-11 fleet in January 2026.

Most of the airlines that ordered the MD-11 for their long-haul passenger flights had replaced it with Airbus A330, A340 and Boeing 777s by the end of 2004. Some carriers converted their MD-11s to freighters such as China Eastern Airlines and Korean Air. Korean Air announced as early as December 1994 its intention to convert its five passenger MD-11s to freighters for medium-range cargo routes. In 1995, American Airlines agreed to sell its 19 aircraft to FedEx, transferring the first MD-11 in 1996. Japan Airlines (JAL) announced the replacement of its 10 MD-11s in 2000; these aircraft were being converted into freighters and sold to UPS in 2004.

In February 2007, TAM Linhas Aéreas began operating the first of three leased passenger MD-11s, in a deal arranged by Boeing as an interim solution for TAM to quickly be able to operate newly granted intercontinental routes while waiting for four Boeing 777-300ERs to be delivered from late 2008. The last MD-11 was retired from TAM's fleet in July 2009, which ended its use by Brazilian airlines (Varig, VASP, and TAM).

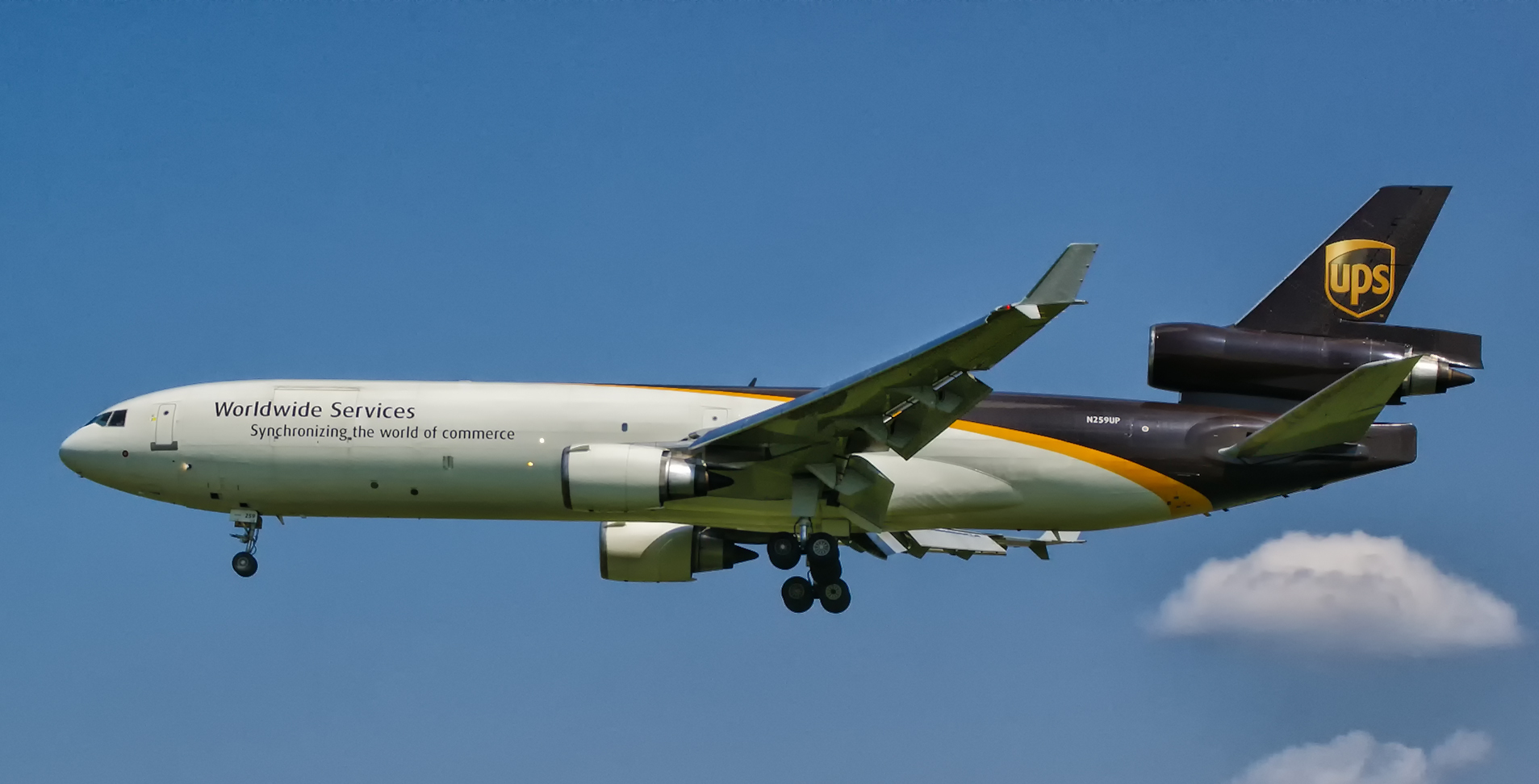
An MD-11 owned by UPS, formerly the second-largest operator of the type. This aircraft later crashed as UPS Airlines Flight 2976.

In May 2007, Finnair announced the sale of their last two MD-11s to Aeroflot-Cargo to become part of the Russian airline cargo fleet in 2008 and 2009. KLM was the last airline to operate scheduled passenger flights with the passenger version of the MD-11. The final scheduled flight took place on October 26, 2014, from Montréal to Amsterdam, followed by three special roundtrip flights on November 11, 2014. Lufthansa Cargo retired its last MD-11 on October 17, 2021.

Two MD-11s were also operated in a VIP configuration, one by Saudia Royal Flight for members of the Royal family, and one by Mid East Jet for ASACO Aviation; both are now stored.

=== Retirements ===
In March 2025, FedEx announced plans to delay the retirement of its MD-11 fleet until 2032.

On November 8, 2025, days after the crash of a UPS Airlines MD-11 in Louisville, Kentucky, the FAA issued an Emergency Airworthiness Directive grounding all MD-11 aircraft. UPS Airlines announced in January 2026 the permanent retirement of its entire MD-11 fleet following the Louisville crash. The grounding order was lifted on May 11, 2026, enabling FedEx and Western Global to progressively return its MD-11s to service.

== Accidents and incidents ==
As of November 2025, the MD-11 has been involved in 50 aviation incidents, including 11 hull-loss accidents with 261 fatalities (245 passengers and crew + 16 ground fatalities).

=== Notable accidents and incidents ===
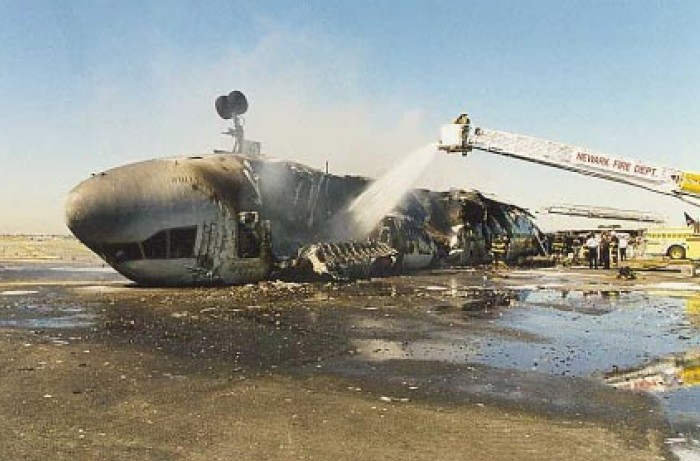
The wreckage of FedEx Express Flight 14 after the fire was extinguished

- April 6, 1993 – China Eastern Airlines Flight 583: An MD-11 (registration B-2171) en route over the Pacific Ocean near the Aleutian Islands experienced severe oscillations after a crew member accidentally deployed the slats while cruising. Two passengers were seriously injured and later died.
- July 31, 1997 – FedEx Express Flight 14: An MD-11 (registration N611FE) crashed during landing at Newark Liberty International Airport, New Jersey. The aircraft flipped onto its back and burned following an unstabilized flare. All five occupants survived with injuries, but the aircraft was damaged beyond repair.
- September 2, 1998 – Swissair Flight 111: An MD-11 (registration HB-IWF) crashed into the Atlantic Ocean near Halifax, Nova Scotia, while en route from New York City to Geneva, Switzerland. All 229 passengers and crew were killed. The cause was traced to a fire originating from improper wiring of an in-flight entertainment system, which spread rapidly due to the poor flame-retardant properties of metalized mylar insulation.
- September 10, 1998, China Eastern Airlines Flight 586: An MD-11 (registration B-2173) suffered from a nose gear failure and returned back to Shanghai Hongqiao International Airport safely. All 137 occupants survived though 9 were injured during the evacuation.
- April 15, 1999 – Korean Air Cargo Flight 6316: An MD-11F (registration HL7373) crashed shortly after takeoff from Shanghai Hongqiao International Airport. The flight crew mistakenly believed they were too high and initiated a rapid descent from which recovery was impossible. All three occupants and five people on the ground were killed.
- August 22, 1999 – China Airlines Flight 642: An MD-11 (registration B-150) operated by China Airlines crashed while landing at Hong Kong International Airport during Tropical Storm Sam in high crosswinds. The aircraft overturned and burned, killing three passengers.
- October 17, 1999 – FedEx Express Flight 087: An MD-11F (registration N581FE) crashed after landing at Subic Bay International Airport, Philippines. The accident was attributed to the flight crew's failure to respond correctly to an erroneous airspeed indication. Both pilots survived with minor injuries, but the aircraft was written off.
- March 23, 2009 – FedEx Express Flight 80: An MD-11F (registration N526FE) crashed while landing at Narita International Airport, Tokyo, Japan, during strong winds. The aircraft bounced upon landing, impacted nose-first, flipped onto its side, and caught fire. Both flight crew members were killed.
- November 28, 2009 – Avient Aviation Flight 324: An MD-11F (registration Z-BAV) crashed during takeoff from Shanghai Pudong International Airport. Three of the seven occupants were killed, and the aircraft was written off.
- July 27, 2010 – Lufthansa Cargo Flight 8460: An MD-11F (registration D-ALCQ) crash-landed at King Khalid International Airport, Riyadh, Saudi Arabia. The aircraft broke apart and caught fire. Both pilots survived with injuries.
- October 13, 2012 – Centurion Cargo Flight 425: An MD-11F (registration N988AR) lost the left main landing gear while landing on runway 15 at Viracopos International Airport in São Paulo, Brazil. No injuries and deaths were reported.
- June 6, 2016 – UPS Airlines Flight 61: An MD-11F (registration N277UP) suffered a runway excursion and nose gear collapse following an aborted takeoff at Seoul–Incheon International Airport. All four crew members survived uninjured; the aircraft was written off.

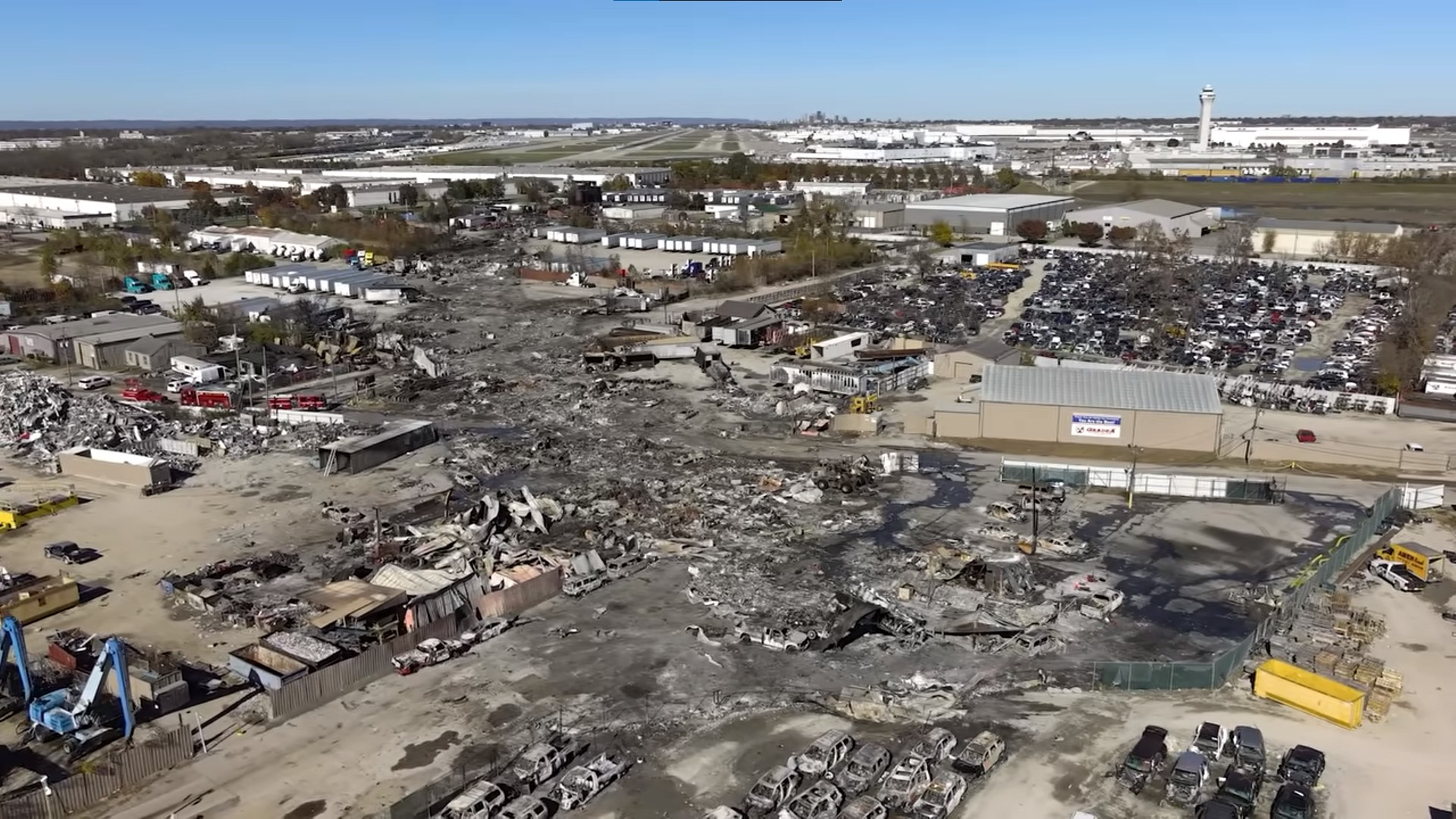
Aftermath of the crash of Flight 2976 in Knopp, Louisville

- November 4, 2025 – UPS Airlines Flight 2976: An MD-11F (registration N259UP) crashed shortly after takeoff from Louisville Muhammad Ali International Airport, Kentucky, going to Daniel K. Inouye International Airport of Honolulu, Hawaii. The preliminary report indicates that the left engine and pylon separated from the aircraft and ignited a fire in the left wing during rotation. The three occupants, all flight crew members, were killed, in addition to twelve ground fatalities.

=== Handling concerns ===
The MD-11's unique handling characteristics and flight control systems have contributed in several accidents and incidents since the aircraft's introduction. The initial design of the slat/flap lever in the cockpit left it prone to being accidentally dislodged by a crew in flight. The defect has been corrected since 1992. In the early 2000s, Boeing improved the flight control software at the urging of the FAA to reduce the possibility of violent unintentional pitch movements.

To improve fuel efficiency, McDonnell Douglas designed the MD-11's center of gravity to be farther aft in cruise than that of other commercial aircraft by utilizing a fuel-ballast tank in the horizontal stabilizer. The tank would empty, shifting the center of gravity forward before landing. The design enabled a significantly smaller tailplane than the DC-10's to improve fuel efficiency, but this was found to inhibit the MD-11's stability during crosswind landings due to the reduced pitch damping. Furthermore, the MD-11's wings have one of the highest wing loadings of any airliner, further reducing drag and making it more comfortable during cruise. However, these design features, which contribute to standard landing speeds 10–20 knots (20–35 km/h) faster than those of comparable aircraft, reduce the MD-11's margin for error during the takeoff and landing phases, making it more difficult to handle than the smaller DC-10. On several occasions, pilots tended to overcontrol the aircraft in a phenomenon known as pilot-induced oscillation as a result of the MD-11's slower but greater response to flight control inputs when compared to the DC-10. Several operators have introduced special training to assist crews in safely handling the MD-11's critical phases of flight.

As of the end of 2024, the MD-11 has a hull rate of 3.12 per million departures. The MD-11 has the highest hull loss rate and second highest fatal loss rate of any wide-body commercial jet airliner manufactured outside of the former Soviet Union or People's Republic of China, behind the A310.

== Specifications ==
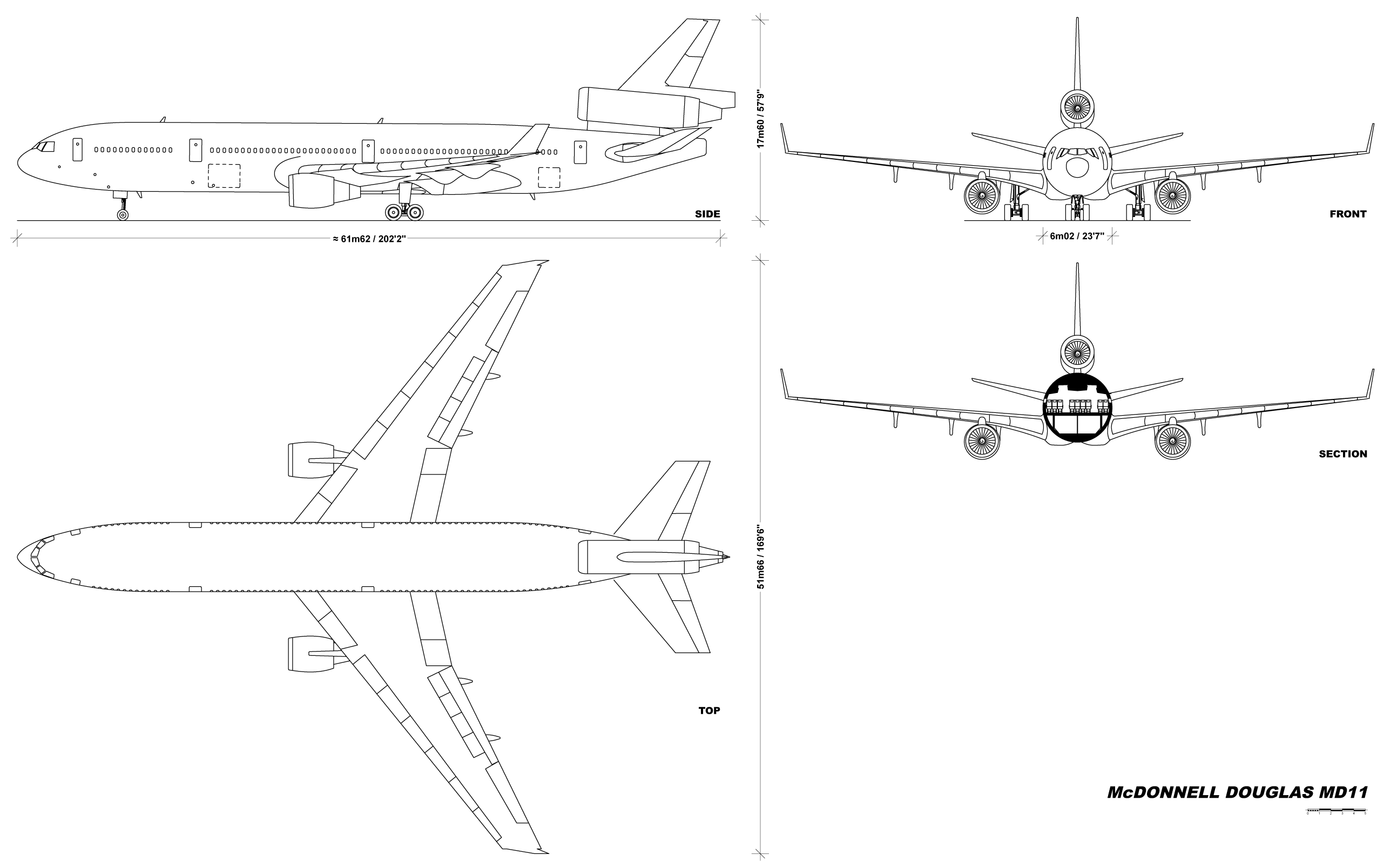
MD-11 multi-view

MD-11 airplane characteristics
Variant	MD-11	MD-11F
Cockpit crew	Two	
Main deck	298: 16F + 56J + 226Y or 323: 34J + 289Y or 410Y, 10-abreast	26 96 × 125" pallets or 34 88 × 108" pallets 21,530 cu.ft / 609.7 m^{3}
Lower deck	32 LD3	
Length	GE: 202 ft 2 in / 61.6 m, PW: 200 ft 11 in / 61.2 m	
Width	19 ft 9 in / 6.0 m fuselage, 225 in (572 cm) cabin	
Wing	170 ft 6 in / 51.97 m span, 3,648 sq ft (338.9 m^{2}) area (Note: Excluding winglets)	
Height	57 ft 11 in (17.65 m)	
MTOW	602,500 to 625,500 lb / 273,294 to 283,722 kg, ER: 630,500 lb / 285,988 kg	
Max. payload	116,025 lb / 52,632 kg	201,025 lb / 91,185 kg
Fuel capacity	38,615 US gal / 32,153 imp gal / 146,173 L, 258,721 lb / 117,356 kg (Note: 278,821 lb (126,471 kg) with optional 3,000 US gal (2,498 imp gal; 11,356 L) tank in 2 LD3 positions.)	
OEW	283,975 lb / 128,808 kg	260,275 lb / 118,061 kg
Engines (×3)	PW4460/62 / General Electric CF6-80C2D1F	
Maximum thrust (×3)	62,000 lbf (280 kN) / 61,500 lbf (274 kN)	
Speed	Mach 0.83 (479 kn; 886 km/h; 551 mph) cruise Mach 0.88 (507 kn; 940 km/h; 584 mph) MMo	
Range	6,725 nmi (12,455 km; 7,739 mi) (Note: 298 pax. and bags, ER: 7,130 nmi (13,200 km; 8,210 mi).)	3,533 nmi (6,543 km; 4,066 mi) (Note: ER, 200,309 lb / 91,185 kg payload.)
Ceiling	43,200 ft (13,200 m)	
Takeoff distance at MTOW	9,725 ft (2,964 m), ER: 10,800 ft (3,292 m)	

== Deliveries ==
1990	1991	1992	1993	1994	1995	1996	1997	1998	1999	2000	2001	Total
3	31	42	36	17	18	15	12	12	8	4	2	200

McDonnell Douglas MD-11 deliveries (by year):

Deliveries

== See also ==
External image
- McDonnell Douglas MD-11 cutaway
- McDonnell Douglas MD-11 cutaway from Flightglobal.com via web.archive.org

Related development

- McDonnell Douglas DC-10 – Wide-body three-engine airliner
- McDonnell Douglas MD-12 – Planned double-deck wide-body airliner, never produced

Aircraft of comparable role, configuration, and era

- Airbus A340 – Four-engined twin-aisle airliner family
- Boeing 777 – Large twin-aisle airliner family
- Ilyushin Il-96 – Russian four-engined long-range wide-body jet airliner

Related lists

- List of aircraft
- List of civil aircraft
- List of jet airliners
