= Western Global Airlines =

American cargo airline

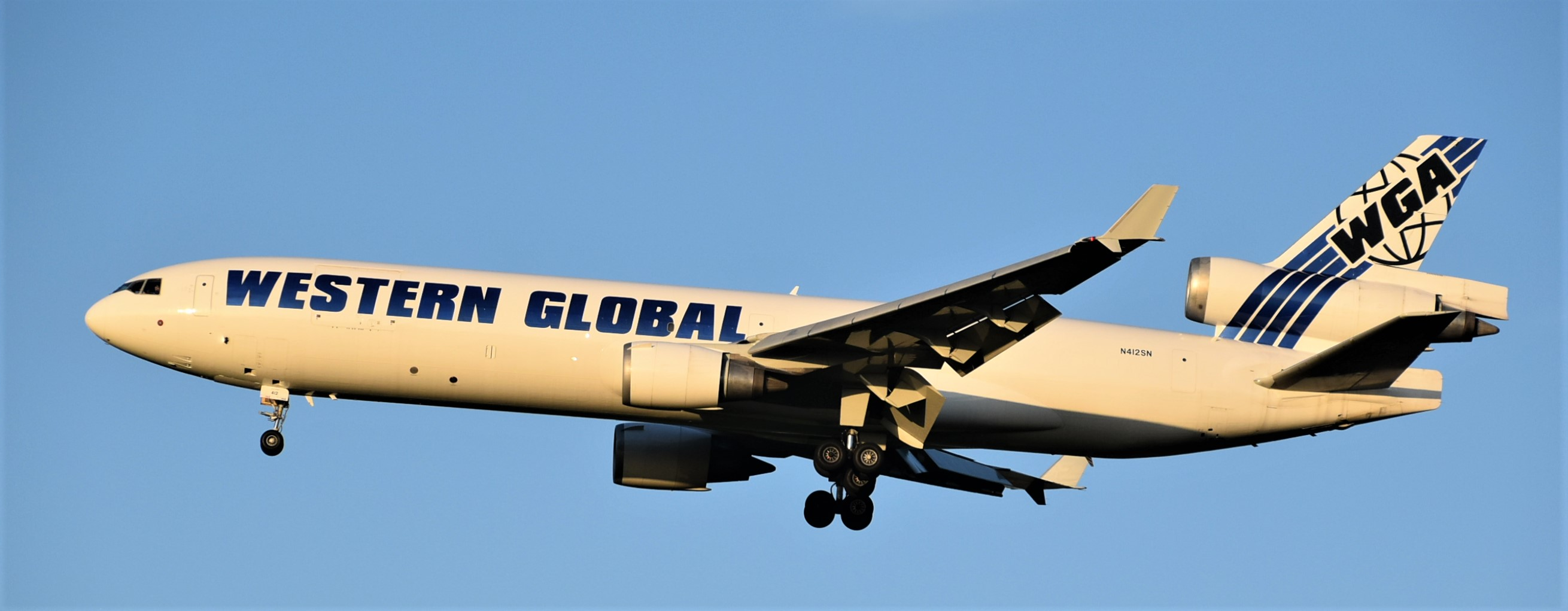
- A Western Global Airlines McDonnell Douglas MD-11F
IATA	ICAO	Call sign
KD	WGN	WESTERN GLOBAL
- Founded: March 6, 2013
- Commenced operations: August 1, 2014
- AOC #: 9WGA495N
- Hubs: Fort Myers
- Secondary hubs: Anchorage; Hong Kong; Liege; Los Angeles; Miami; Seoul–Incheon; Shreveport
- Fleet size: 19
- Parent company: Western Global Holdings
- Headquarters: Estero, Florida, United States
- Key people: Jim Neff (President and CEO)
- Website: www.westernglobalairlines.com

Western Global Airlines, LLC is an American cargo airline based in Estero, Florida. The company's services include aircraft leasing, commercial charters, and military charters. Its main hub is located at Southwest Florida International Airport in Fort Myers, Florida. In July 2018, the company established a 160,000 sq ft (15,000 m^{2}) aircraft maintenance facility in Shreveport, Louisiana, capable of housing three wide-body aircraft simultaneously.

The company filed for Chapter 11 bankruptcy on August 7, 2023, and exited in December 2023.

== History ==
Western Global Airlines was founded on March 6, 2013, by Jim Neff. It was certified by the United States Department of Transportation on February 24, 2014, with FAA approval being granted on August 1, 2014, for operations using the McDonnell Douglas MD-11F. Boeing 747-400 freighter operations were approved by the FAA on November 16, 2015, and Department of Transportation approval was granted on May 25, 2016.

In June 2019, Flexport filed a complaint against Western Global Airlines, claiming that the airline failed to meet the reliability rate mandated by their contract. On June 7, 2019, Western Global Airlines ceased operations for Flexport, which then switched to Atlas Air. On August 7, 2023, Western Global filed for Chapter 11 bankruptcy. On December 5, 2023, Western Global announced that they exited Chapter 11 bankruptcy with less than US$100 Million in debt.

On May 8, 2018, Western Global Airlines announced that the company will establish an aircraft maintenance facility at Shreveport Regional Airport. Western Global made a capital investment of $3 million for tooling and equipment to support the 152,000 square feet (14,100 m^{2}) Hangar 40, formerly leased by ExpressJet Airlines. The company selected Shreveport as a conveniently located and well-qualified hub for maintaining its fleet of Boeing 747-400 and McDonnell Douglas MD-11 wide-body freighter aircraft. The Shreveport Facility would close following the 2023 chapter 11 bankruptcy filing, with Shreveport Regional Airport being listed as an unpaid third party, citing unpaid hangar rent to the sum of $292,573. This facility has since been taken up by Skywest Airlines in 2025.

On November 22, 2025, Western Global announced a large furlough of employees due to the extended grounding of the MD-11 airframe, which makes up the majority of the fleet the airline operates.

== Fleet ==
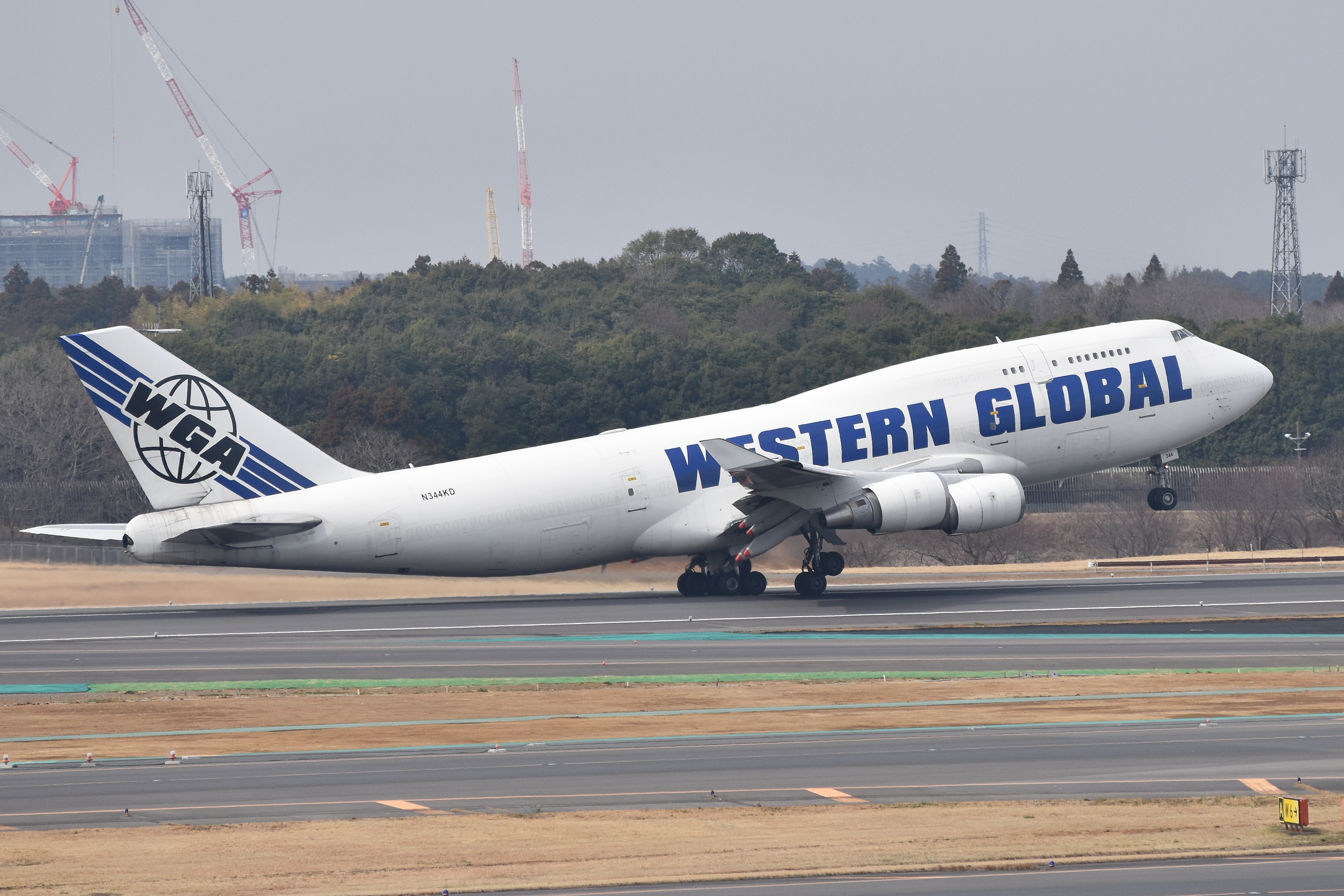
A Western Global Boeing 747-400F

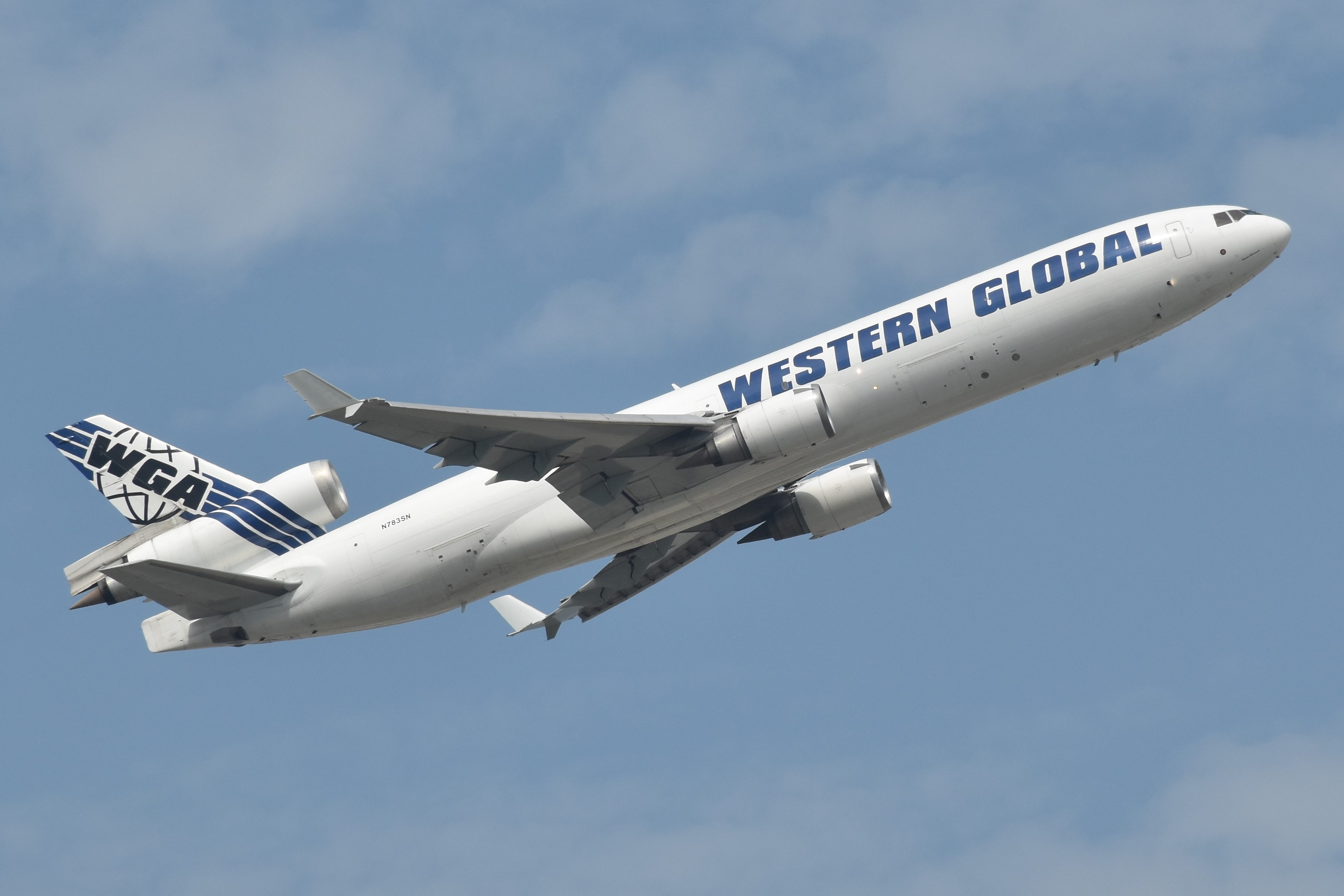
A Western Global McDonnell Douglas MD-11F

As of November 2025, Western Global Airlines operates the following aircraft:

Aircraft	In service	Orders	Notes
Boeing 747-400F	4	—	
McDonnell Douglas MD-11F	15	—	2 in service as of June 2026; 13 remaining aircraft are stored.
Total	19	—	

== Incidents ==
- On February 13, 2016, Western Global Airlines Flight 4425, a McDonnell Douglas MD-11F (registered as N545JN) took off from Munich, Germany on a flight to King Shaka International Airport, South Africa, carrying banknotes intended for the South African Reserve Bank. While making a fuel stop in Harare, Zimbabwe, the aircraft was impounded, and its crew were arrested after ground staff reported seeing blood dripping from the aircraft. A subsequent search found a corpse in the lower compartment. Zimbabwean Police reported the man was likely a stowaway who died from a lack of oxygen. The crew and the aircraft were later released.

== See also ==
- List of airlines of the United States

Media related to Western Global Airlines at Wikimedia Commons
