= UPS Airlines =

Cargo airline based in the United States

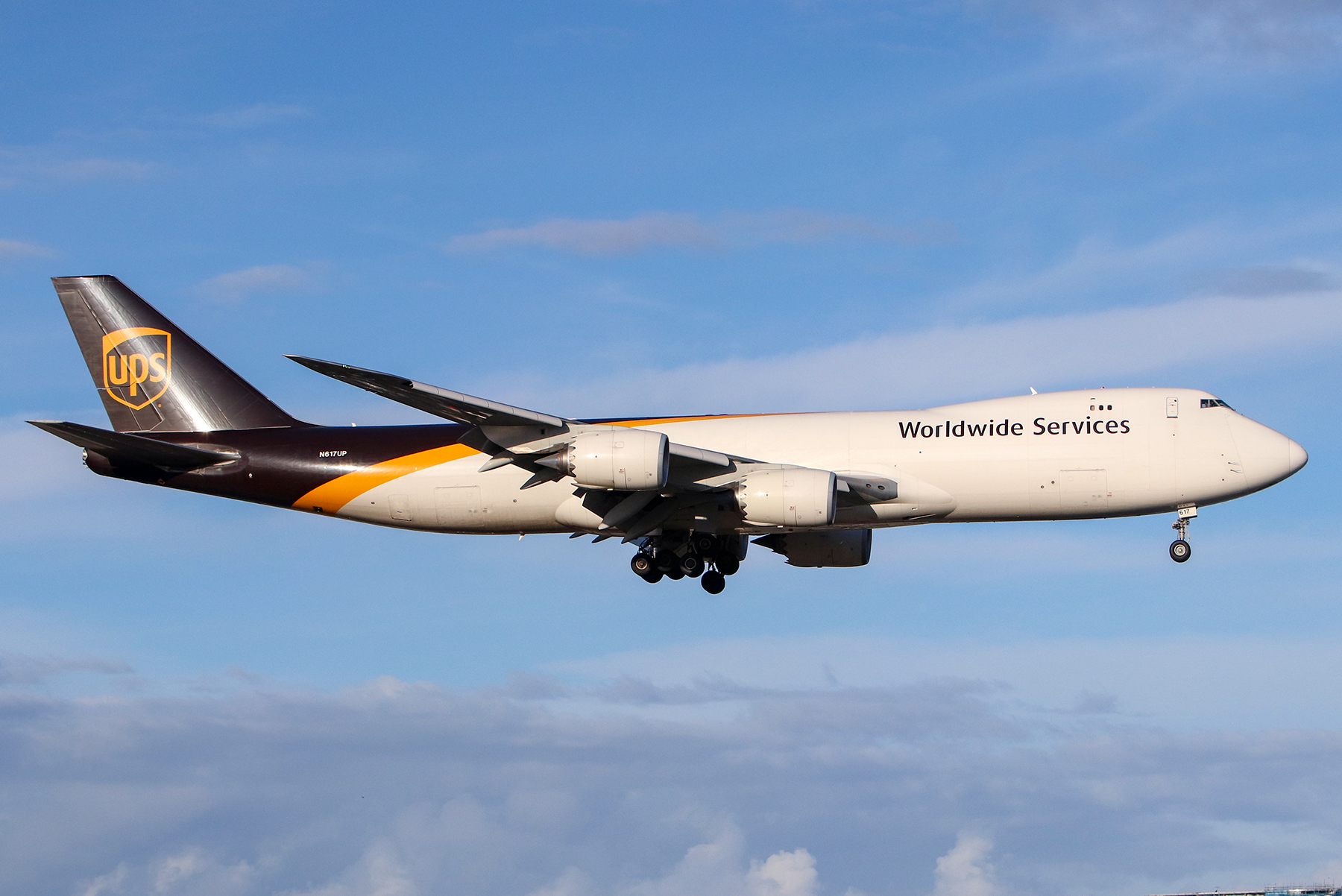
- A UPS Airlines Boeing 747-8F
| IATA | ICAO | Call sign |
|---|---|---|
| 5X | UPS | UPS |
- Founded: July 13, 1988; 38 years ago
- AOC #: IPXA097B
- Hubs: Worldport; Louisville; United States; Anchorage; Columbia (SC); Chicago/Rockford; Dallas/Fort Worth; Miami; Ontario (CA); Philadelphia; Seattle–Boeing; San Juan; International hubs; Clark; Cologne/Bonn; East Midlands; Istanbul; Hamilton (ON); Hong Kong; Kuala Lumpur–International; Shanghai–Pudong; Shenzhen
- Fleet size: 272 (as of March 2026)
- Destinations: 815 (400 domestic, 415 international)
- Parent company: United Parcel Service, Inc.
- Headquarters: Louisville, Kentucky, US
- Key people: Jim Joseph (President)
- Employees: 26,328
- Website: www.ups.com/aircargo/

UPS Airlines is a major American cargo airline based in Louisville, Kentucky. One of the largest cargo airlines worldwide in terms of freight volume flown, UPS Airlines flies to 815 destinations worldwide. It has been a wholly owned subsidiary of United Parcel Service since its launch in 1988.

Like passenger airlines, UPS Airlines operates under the hub-and-spoke model. Its primary hub in the United States is at Louisville Muhammad Ali International Airport, where it built a 5,200,000 square foot facility called UPS Worldport. UPS also has secondary hubs across the United States and international hubs in Canada, China, England, Germany, Malaysia, the Philippines, and Puerto Rico.

The pilots of UPS Airlines are represented by the Independent Pilots Association.

== History ==
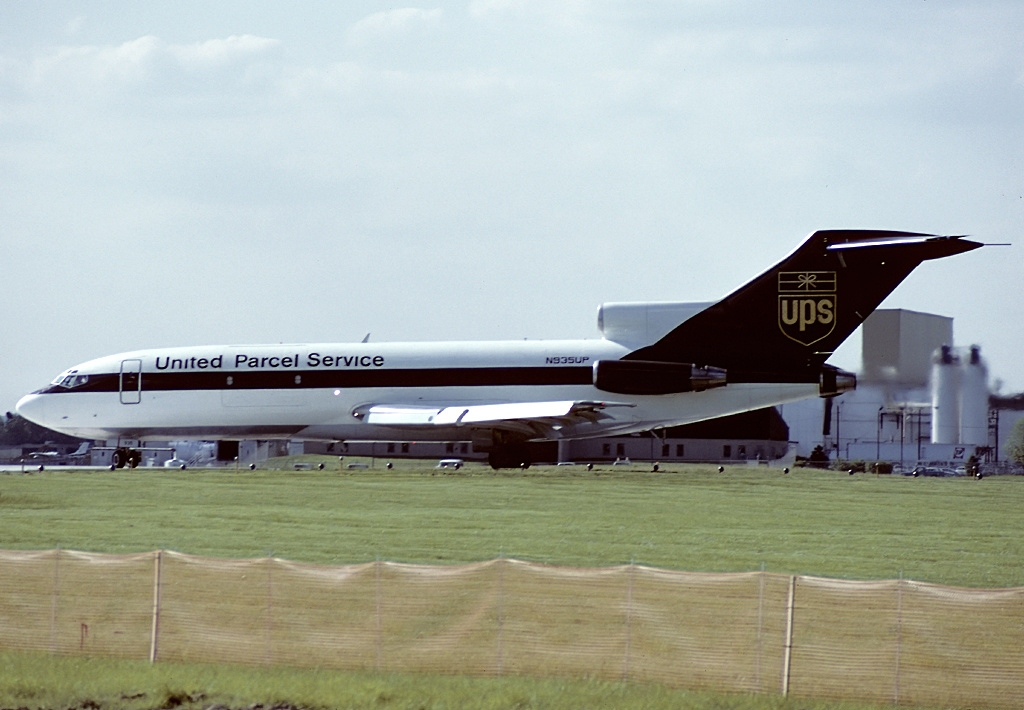
A Boeing 727-100F taxiing in Louisville, Kentucky

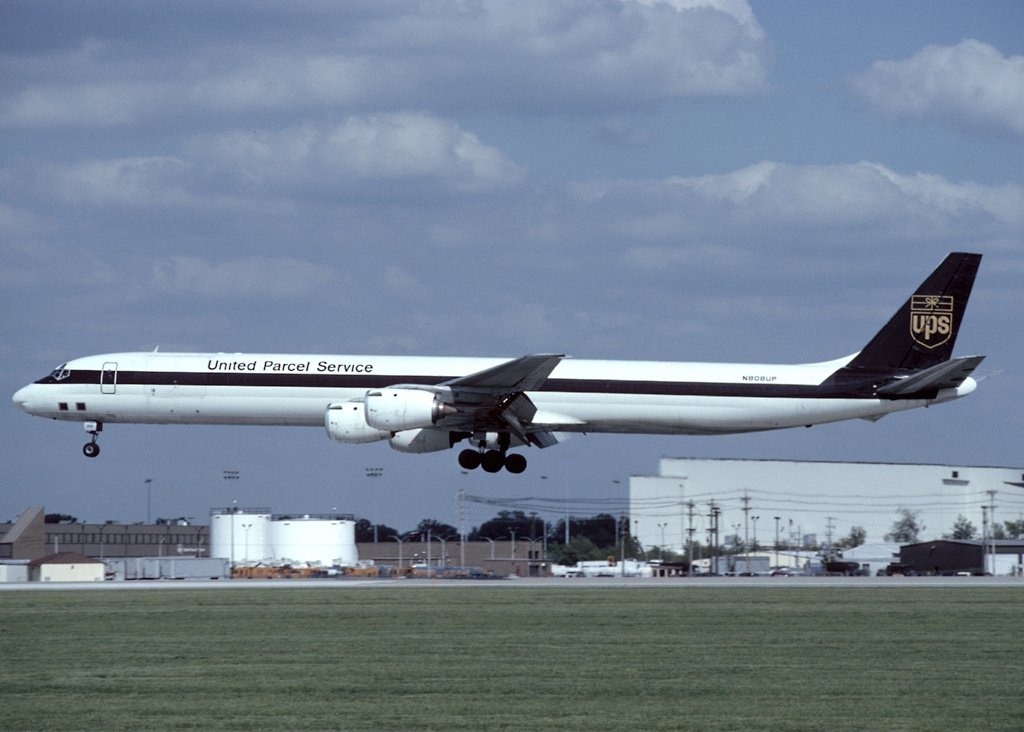
A Douglas DC-8-73F landing at Louisville, Kentucky

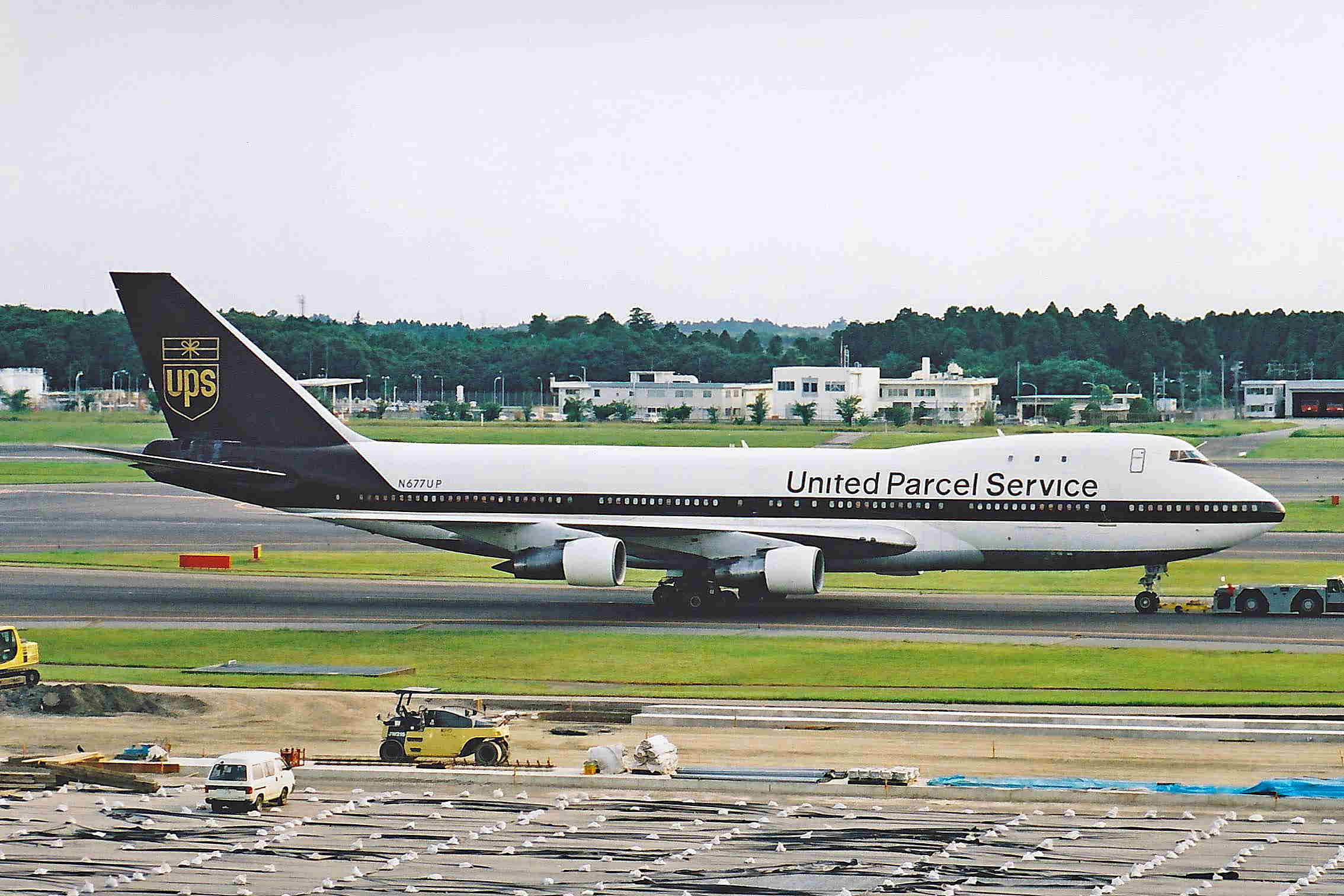
A Boeing 747-100F in Tokyo Narita

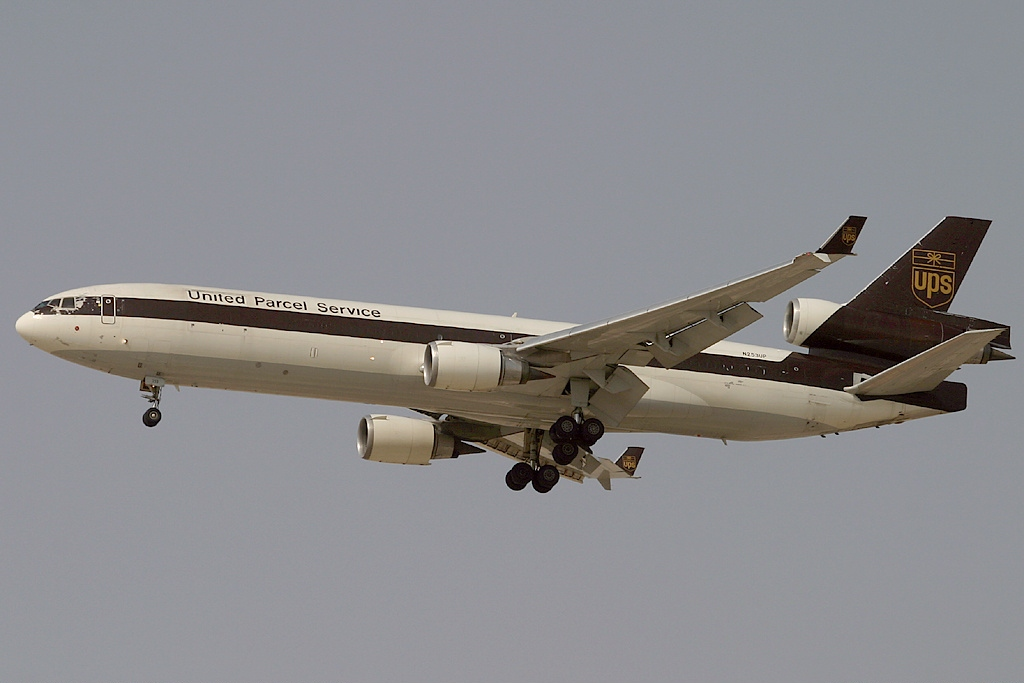
A McDonnell Douglas MD-11

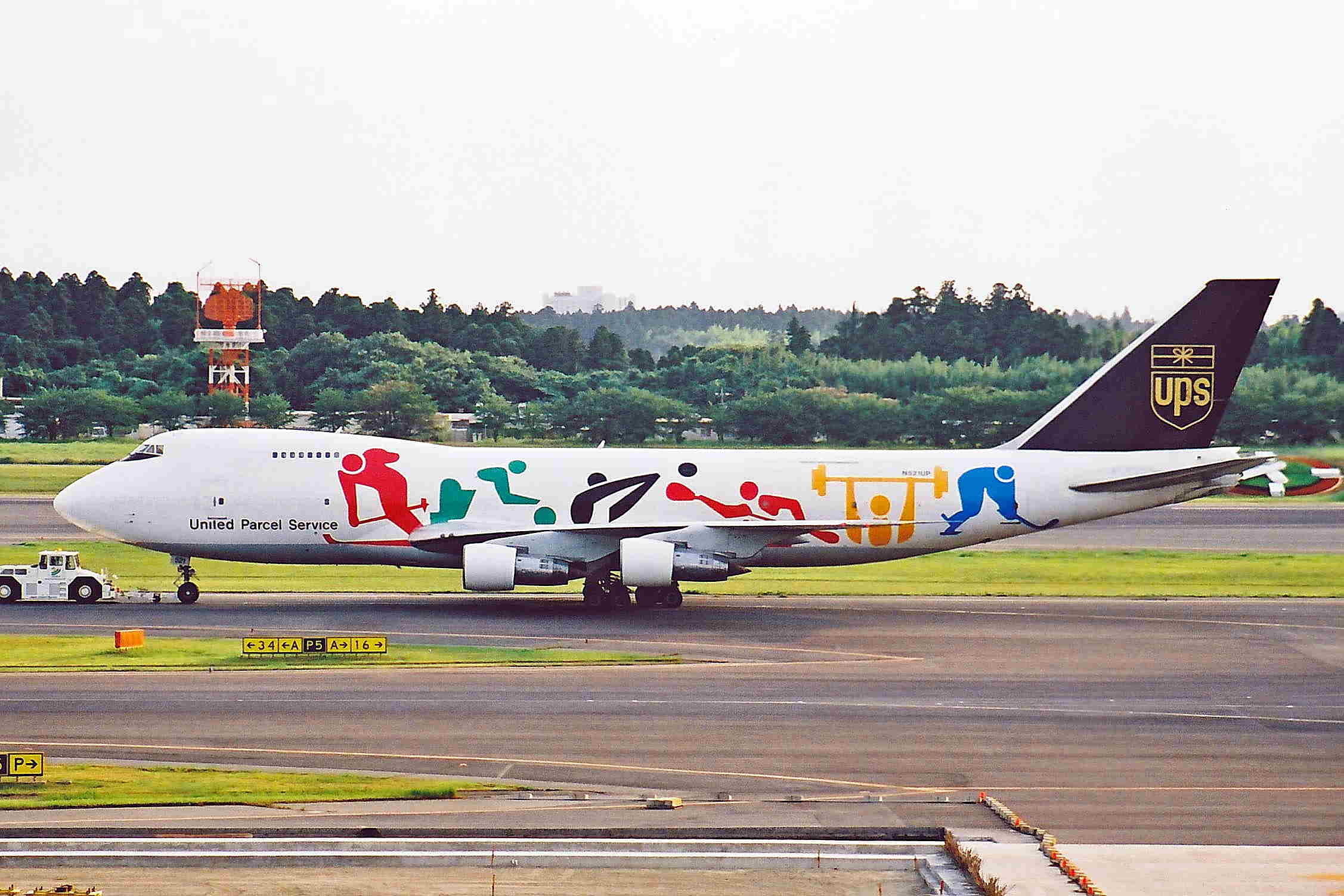
A UPS Boeing 747-200 in the Atlanta 1996 Summer Olympics sponsorship livery taxiing in Tokyo Narita

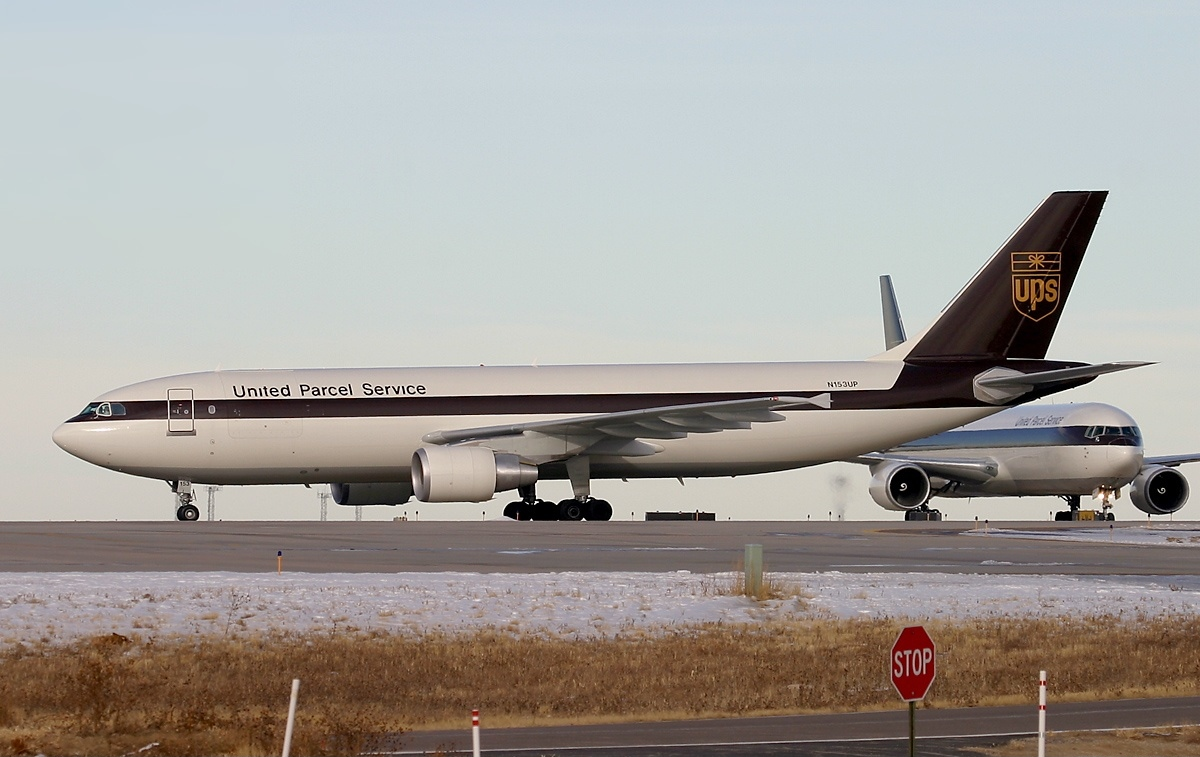
An Airbus A300-600F in the original livery in Denver

=== 1929–1931: First UPS air service ===
The air cargo business of the United Parcel Service began in 1929. At first, UPS shipped packages as baggage on commercial airline flights on the West Coast of the United States. After Black Tuesday and the beginning of the Great Depression, UPS discontinued the air freight service by late 1931.

=== 1950s–1970s: Packages as luggage ===
After World War II, UPS (in the process of acquiring common carrier rights for every address in the United States) revisited the idea of shipping packages by air. Starting in 1953, 2-day delivery was offered on coast-to-coast packages; the service was called Blue Label Air. As before, UPS package volume was transported on commercial airline flights. Initially unprofitable, Blue Label Air became popular as its speed created enough demand to maintain a profit.

In 1975, UPS started its first international operations as it expanded into Canada, with an additional expansion into West Germany a year later.

As UPS had become an international company, access to its own cargo aircraft had become a more apparent issue. In 1976, competitor Federal Express (which owned its own fleet of jet aircraft) had turned a profit, showcasing that package delivery companies did not have to exclusively rely on commercial aircraft to transport their volume.

In 1977, the Air Cargo Deregulation Act gave UPS a significant opportunity: the company could now establish its own airline and flying from city to city would require far fewer legislative hurdles as the federal government now encouraged competition between airlines.

=== 1980s: Establishment of UPS Airlines ===
In 1980, UPS opened its first major hub for sorting packages transported by aircraft, located in Louisville, Kentucky. Located at the westernmost point of the Eastern time zone, Louisville is accessible (by jet aircraft) across the majority of the contiguous United States in less than three hours. In contrast to chief competitor Federal Express (which owned its own aircraft), in the early 1980s, air operations of UPS were undertaken by several contractors, including Evergreen International Airlines, Interstate Airlines, Ryan International Airlines, and Orion Air. Through its contractors, UPS flew its packages using a fleet of commercial aircraft converted to freighters, including Boeing 727-100s, 727-200s, Douglas DC-8s, and Boeing 747-100s.

In 1982, UPS introduced its Next-Day Air service, guaranteeing overnight delivery on certain packages.

To expand its flight network, UPS opened a distribution facility in Anchorage in 1985. Similar to Louisville, Anchorage was chosen for its strategic geographical position, accessible to 90% of the industrialized world in less than 9 1/2 hours flying distance.

In 1986, in an effort to obtain service rights to Japan, UPS entered into a joint venture with DHL, named International Parcel Express (IPX). IPX was rejected for use in Japan, leading UPS to purchase the DHL share of the joint venture in 1987. In August 1987, UPS announced it would take control of its own flying from Evergreen, Interstate, Orion and Ryan. UPS transitioned to its own flying over the course of 1988 in part using a Louisville training facility purchased from Orion. The decision by UPS to insource resulted in substantial dislocation among its contractors. Interstate went bankrupt and later liquidated, and UPS's decision contributed to Ryan becoming moribund for a time. Orion also wound down by the end of 1989.

=== 1990s: Network expansion ===
At the 1988 founding of UPS Airlines, the company operated a route network serving 41 countries connecting the United States and Canada to Asia and Europe. To expand and modernize its jet fleet, at the end of 1987, UPS purchased dedicated freighter variants of the Boeing 757. In 1995, UPS purchased a second aircraft type from Boeing, the Boeing 767 freighter. The launch customer of both aircraft, UPS Airlines would purchase 75 757s and 32 767s, more than doubling the size of its aircraft fleet.

To update the oldest aircraft in its fleet, the 727-100QF conversion was introduced (QF=Quiet Freighter). In place of a hush kit, the QF conversion changed the aircraft from Pratt & Whitney JT8D to Rolls-Royce Tay turbofans.

In 1991, to gain the ability to fly domestic cargo flights within Europe, UPS entered into a partnership with Danish airline Star Air (part of the Maersk conglomerate), leasing several 727 freighters to the airline (later replaced by 757 freighters).

In the early 1990s, to add capacity to its network, UPS Airlines opened additional hubs, with primary hubs in Rockford, Illinois (Chicago) and Philadelphia; secondary hubs were opened in Dallas/Fort Worth; Columbia, South Carolina; and Ontario, California (Los Angeles).

With most of its aircraft flying primarily on weeknights, the airline was eager to find other ways to produce income from its fleet. In the 1990s, eight 727 freighters were converted (at a cost of $2.5 million each) into 727-100QC (QC=Quick Change) freighters with the ability to be re-converted into passenger aircraft for the purpose of chartered flights. After disappointing results, in 2001, UPS ended charter service with quick-change freighters, with the aircraft returned to cargo service.

=== 2000s: Worldport and network diversification ===
Following the addition of primary and secondary hubs to the airline network during the 1990s, for much of the next decade, additional demand led to massive expansion of its central Louisville air hub. From 1999 to 2002, in a $1 billion expansion, the Louisville hub was doubled in size (to 4 million square feet), with the hub adapting the name of the expansion project, Worldport. As part of the 2004 purchase of Menlo Worldwide Forwarding, a second expansion was completed in 2006 to expand heavy-freight operations in the UPS systems; similar expansions were added to the largest UPS hubs in the United States. From 2006 to 2010, a third expansion added over 1 million square feet to the Worldport facility (to 5.2 million square feet) and added additional ramp space for aircraft.

During the 2000s, further efforts were made by UPS to expand its flight network. In 2000, the company acquired Challenge Air Cargo to expand its services in Latin America. In a new concept, UPS introduced several "around the world" flights; originating from Louisville, the long-distance flights have several intermediate stops in Europe, the Middle East, and Asia, before returning to Worldport. In April 2001, UPS Airlines launched its first direct flights to China, providing service six days a week. In 2004, parent company UPS acquired Menlo Worldwide Forwarding (the successor to Emery Worldwide) to expand its heavy-freight operations.

==== Fleet modernization ====
During the 2000s, the makeup of the UPS Airlines fleet underwent considerable change. As part of a $5 billion purchase of 60 aircraft, UPS phased in its first Airbus A300F freighters in 2000 (its first Airbus aircraft). The same year, the airline announced a $2 billion purchase of 13 McDonnell Douglas MD-11F freighters (with an additional option for 22); in contrast to the A300 freighters, the MD-11s were conversions of recently retired passenger aircraft.

As part of the company rebranding from United Parcel Service to UPS in early 2003, the airline redesigned its aircraft livery, featuring the redesigned company "shield" logo on the vertical stabilizer.

In January 2005, UPS Airlines became the second airline (behind FedEx Express) to order the Airbus A380-800F, placing an order for 10 aircraft (with an option for 10 more). Configured to load three decks of freight (one more than a Boeing 747 and other widebody aircraft), the A380 freighter would have entered service from 2009 to 2012. Under the terms of the A380 purchase, UPS reduced its order for A300 aircraft from 90 aircraft to 53. To modernize its existing wide-body fleet, 11 additional MD-11Fs and 8 Boeing 747-400Fs were ordered.

In February 2007, UPS Airlines nearly doubled the size of its 767 fleet, as an order was placed for 27 additional freighters, entering service between 2009 and 2012. Following years of delays by Airbus, in March 2007, UPS ended its purchase of the Airbus A380F. Alongside the cancellation by FedEx Express, the final A380 purchase by an American-owned airline ended.

By 2007, additional MD-11s and 747-400s had entered service, leading the airline to gradually phase out its oldest aircraft from the fleet. Initially, the Boeing 727 freighters (the oldest and lowest-capacity aircraft) were retired, replaced on routes by Boeing 757 freighters. During 2008 and 2009, the 747-100 and 747-200 aircraft were retired, replaced by the 747-400s and MD-11Fs. In 2009, UPS Airlines retired its entire fleet of DC-8 aircraft; at the time, its 44 aircraft represented nearly half of the active DC-8 fleet flying worldwide.

=== 2010s: Flying further ===
On February 8, 2010, UPS announced the plans to furlough at least 300 pilots in 2010 and 2011, cancelling a 2009 agreement between the company and the Independent Pilots Association. The remaining pilots not furloughed demonstrated unprecedented unity by not flying overtime while colleagues were laid off. UPS decided to reduce the furlough to 109 pilots. The final pilot furloughed was in August 2010. UPS decided to recall pilots back to work in December 2011. The furlough officially ended in May 2014 when the first pilot furloughed returned to work. On September 1, 2016, UPS and the IPA agreed to a new 5-year contract. Key components of the agreement were: immediate increases of 14.65% and a signing bonus in place of retroactive pay; 3% annual wage increases through the span of the contract; enhanced pension benefits; crew rest enhancements, including reduced duty period limits for overnight and international flights; additional sleep facilities at major gateways; and sleep modules in UPS Boeing 767 aircraft.

In 2014, the UPS 767 fleet was modified, as all existing aircraft and all aircraft on order were fitted with winglets. While over 10 feet tall, the large winglets were optimized to reduce drag, consequently reducing fuel consumption and emissions. In 2017, 3 767-300ERs were purchased from Japan Airlines, becoming the first converted 767s for UPS.

In October 2016, UPS Airlines announced a $5.2 billion agreement to purchase 14 Boeing 747-8F freighter aircraft (with an option for 14 more). While originally planning to end production of the 747 by 2020, along with the UPS purchase, Boeing cites replacement of older aircraft, e-commerce, and demand for larger aircraft across international routes as justification for retaining the 747. In February 2018, UPS exercised its option to purchase the additional 14 747 freighters, making UPS the largest operator of the 747-8 worldwide. As part of the option, UPS also purchased 4 additional Boeing 767-300F freighters, delivered by 2022.

The introduction of the 747-8F fleet allows UPS to introduce its longest-ever flight, flying nonstop from Louisville (Worldport) to its gateway in Dubai International Airport (nearly 6,700 miles). The flight segment is part of an "around the world flight", stopping at its hub in Shenzhen, China and making another stop at Ted Stevens Anchorage International Airport in Alaska before returning to Louisville.

=== 2020s ===
In December 2021, UPS placed an order for 19 Boeing 767 freighters, exercising an option for 8 more less than 9 months later. Expanding the UPS 767 fleet to 108 (second only to FedEx), the new aircraft are to enter service by 2025. In March 2023, the airline began the acquisition of two Boeing 747-8Fs previously operated by AirBridge Cargo; the aircraft are intended to begin service during 2024.

In early 2023, UPS announced plans to phase out its MD-11F fleet, beginning with the retirement of six aircraft during the year and the replacement of the remaining aircraft with additional Boeing 767 freighters. Although the 767 has lower payload and range, it offers comparable upper-deck container capacity and improved fuel efficiency. Following the crash of Flight 2976 and the subsequent grounding of the MD-11 fleet, UPS accelerated its plans, retiring all aircraft by the end of 2025.

== Hubs ==
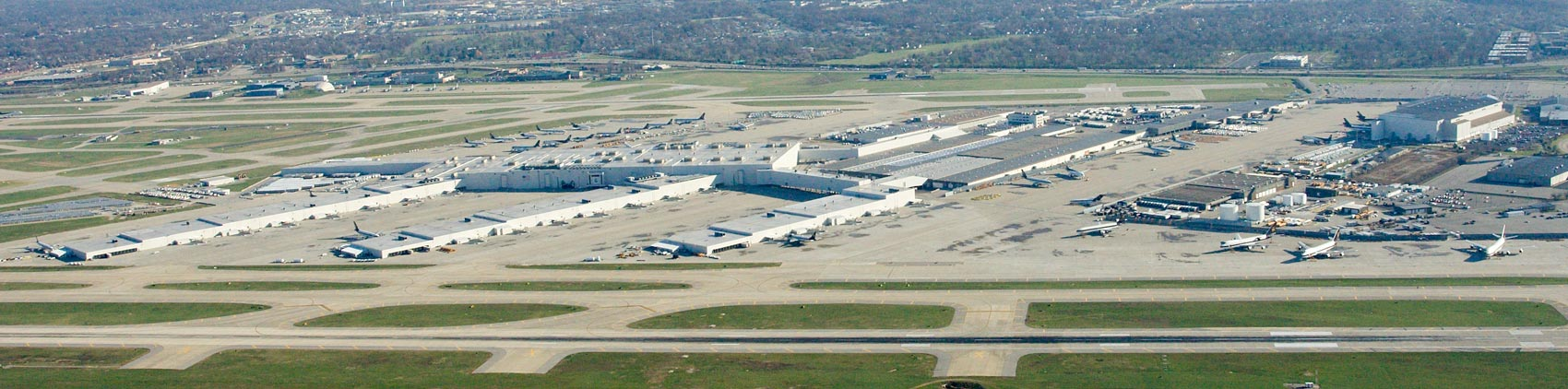
UPS Worldport

Each day, UPS Airlines flies to over 220 countries and territories worldwide, serving 356 airports in the United States with 1,094 flight segments and 311 international airports with 875 flight segments. Using the traditional hub-and-spoke model, UPS Airlines operates through its central facility, Worldport, which is located at Louisville Muhammad Ali International Airport in Louisville, Kentucky. In addition, the company flies through several secondary hubs across the United States, all of which serve smaller facilities.

| Company Location | Airport | | Ramp size | | Building size | | Geographic area served | Notes |
| Company Location | Location | City | Acreage | Parking positions | Square feet | Sort capacity | Geographic area served | Notes |
|---|---|---|---|---|---|---|---|---|
| Worldport (UPS Main Air Hub) | Louisville Muhammad Ali International Airport | Louisville, Kentucky | 300 acres (120 ha) | 125 | 5.2 million square feet | 416,000 packages hourly | Over 200 countries worldwide. | Headquarters of UPS Airlines. |
| East Coast Region Air Hub | Philadelphia International Airport | Philadelphia, Pennsylvania | 49.7 acres (20.1 ha) | 32 | 681,000 square feet | 95,000 packages hourly | Maine, New Hampshire, Vermont, New York, New Jersey, Massachusetts, Connecticut, Rhode Island, Pennsylvania, Maryland, Delaware, Washington DC, Virginia, West Virginia, South Carolina, Georgia, Illinois, Minnesota, Nevada, and California. | |
| West Coast Region Air Hub | Ontario International Airport | Ontario, California | 156 acres (63 ha) | 21 | 779,000 square feet | 67,000 packages hourly | California, Oregon, Washington State, Idaho, Nevada, Montana, Utah, Arizona, New Mexico, Colorado, Wyoming, Kansas and Nebraska. | Also serves Alaska and Hawaii. |
| Southwest Region Air Hub | Dallas Fort Worth International Airport | Dallas/Fort Worth, Texas | 18 acres (7.3 ha) | 17 | 323,000 square feet | 46,000 packages hourly | Texas, Louisiana, Mississippi, Arkansas, Oklahoma, New Mexico, Arizona, Nevada, California, Oregon, Hawaii, New York, Pennsylvania, Maryland, Delaware, Virginia and Washington, D.C. | |
| Rockford Regional Air Hub | Chicago Rockford International Airport | Rockford, Illinois | 50 acres (20 ha) | 40 | 586,000 square feet | 89,000 packages hourly | Massachusetts, Connecticut, Rhode Island, New York, Maryland, Washington D.C., Michigan, Minnesota, Texas, California, Arizona and Washington State. | |

=== International hubs ===
In addition to Worldport, UPS Airlines operates several international hubs worldwide. Its two largest are in North America with an additional location in Europe. In China, the airline operates a system of three facilities that regulate packages for the company across the country. In Germany, the airline utilizes a facility that serves over 200 countries; to do so, many flights chartered by the company originate from here.

| Company Location | Airport | | Ramp size | | Building size | | Geographic area served | Notes |
| Company Location | Location | City | Acreage | Parking positions | Square feet | Sort capacity | Geographic area served | Notes |
|---|---|---|---|---|---|---|---|---|
| Latin America/Caribbean Air Hub | Miami International Airport | Miami-Dade County, Florida | 14.84 acres (6.01 ha) | 9 | 36,000 square feet | 6,500 packages hourly | Central and South America | Also handles domestic packages for Florida and southern U.S. |
| Canada Air Hub | John C. Munro Hamilton International Airport | Hamilton, Ontario | 4.9 acres (2.0 ha) | | 32,000 square feet | 6,000 packages hourly | Canada (all) | |
| European Air Hub | Cologne Bonn Airport | Cologne, North Rhine-Westphalia, Germany | 18.7 acres (7.6 ha) | 64 | 614,000 square feet | 190,000 packages hourly | Europe (all), over 200 countries worldwide. | Second-busiest UPS Airlines facility after Worldport. Source of a large portion of flights chartered by the airline (to serve remote destinations). |
| Asia Pacific Air Hub | Shenzhen Bao'an International Airport | Shenzhen, China | | | 958,000 square feet | 18,000 packages hourly | Asia to Asia, Asia to world, world to Asia | One of the largest facilities, this sorts packages traveling in and out of Asia. |
| Asia Pacific Air Hub | Shanghai Pudong International Airport | Pudong, Shanghai, China. | | | 1 million square feet | 17,000 packages hourly | China to world, world to China | This facility sorts all UPS packages traveling in and out of China. |
| Asia Pacific Air Hub | Hong Kong International Airport | Chek Lap Kok, Hong Kong | | | 45,000 square feet. | 4,800 packages hourly | Asia to Europe, Europe to Asia | Serves as a transfer point of air shipping between Europe and Asia. |

== Fleet ==
=== Current fleet ===
As of March 2026, UPS Airlines has an active fleet of 272 aircraft. Operating an all-jet fleet, the airline does not own any turboprop or short-haul aircraft.

UPS Airlines is the world's largest operator of the Boeing 747-8F, with 30 aircraft in service. It is also the second-largest operator of the Boeing 757 and 767 freighters, as well as the Airbus A300 freighter.

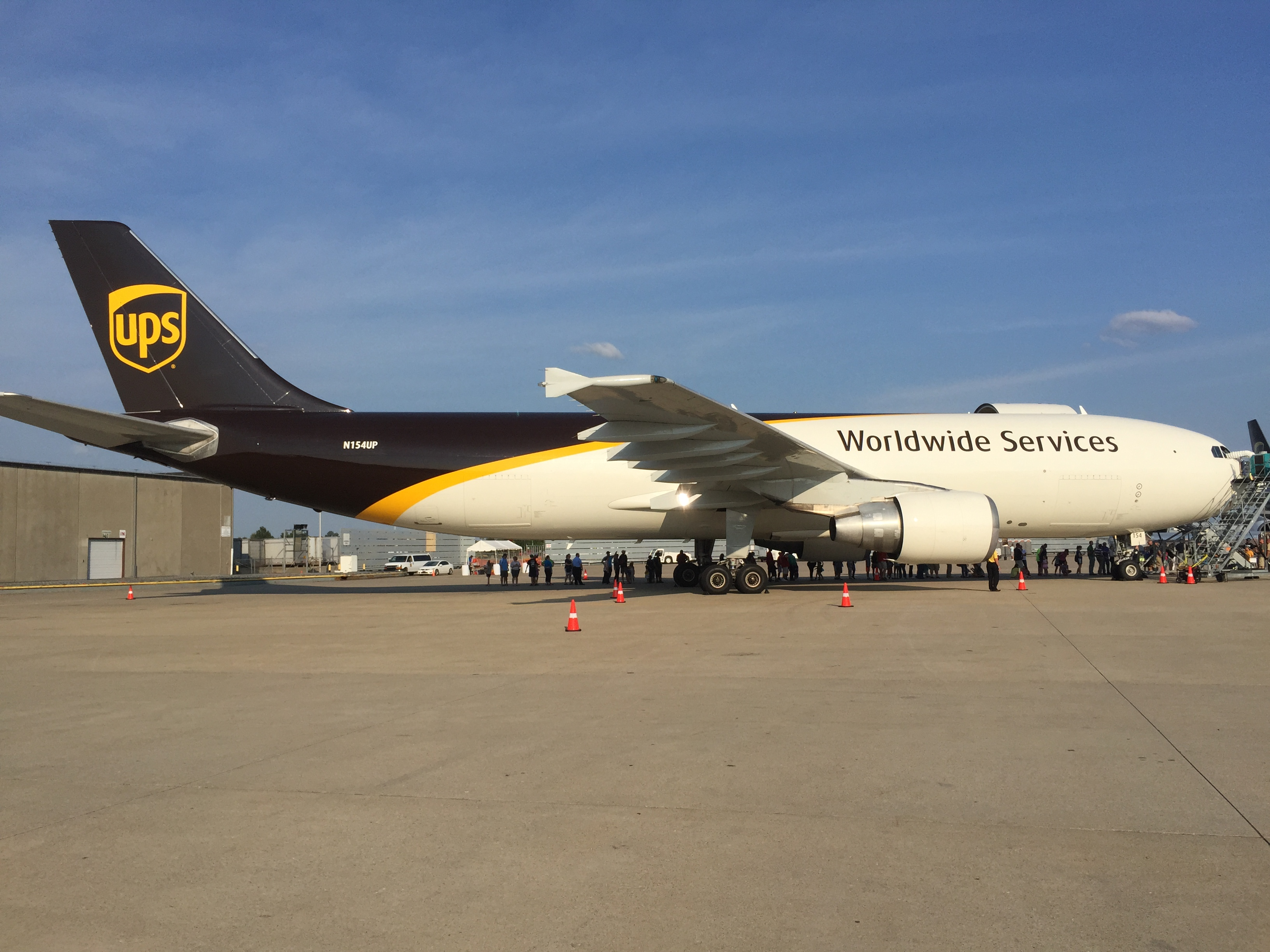
An Airbus A300F in the current livery

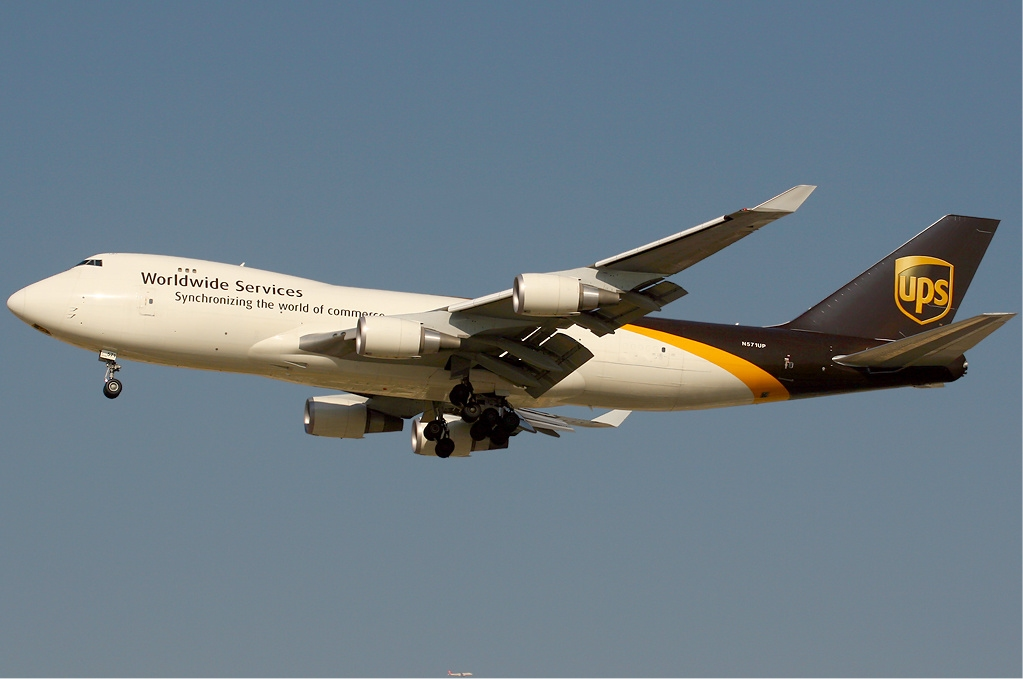
A Boeing 747-400F in the former livery

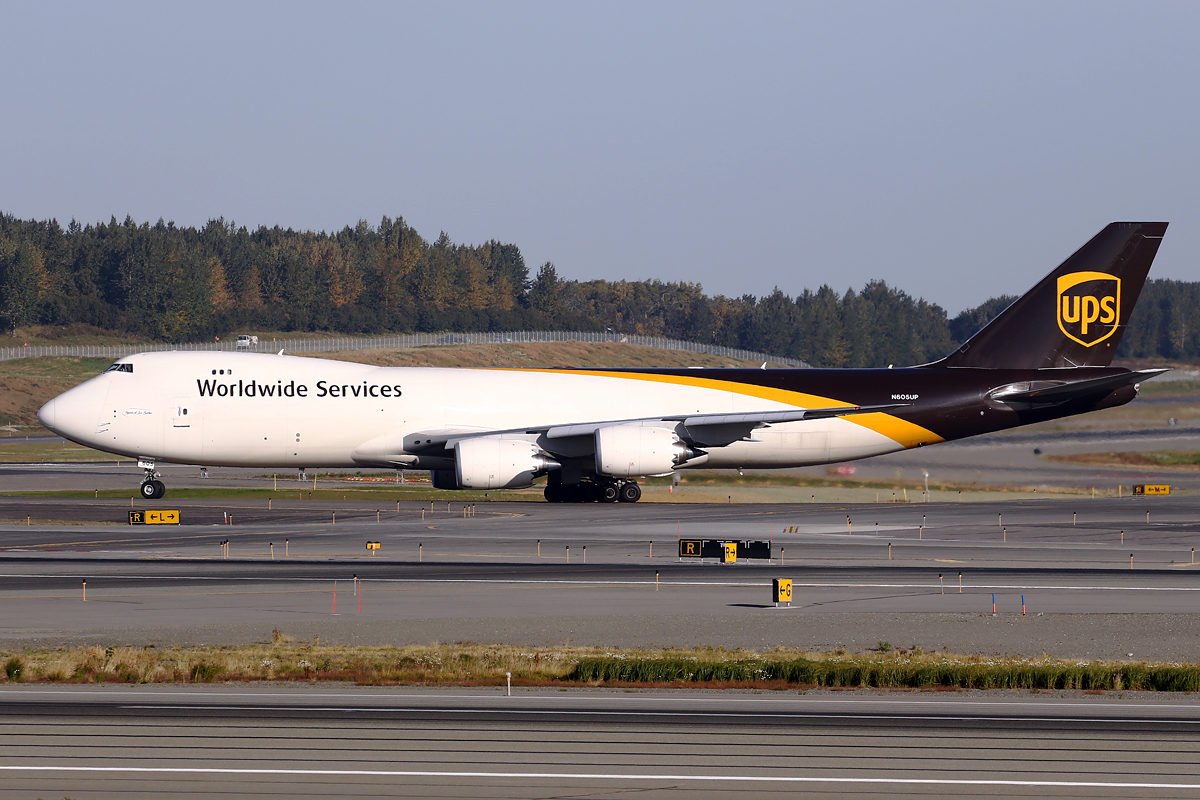
A Boeing 747-8F in the current livery

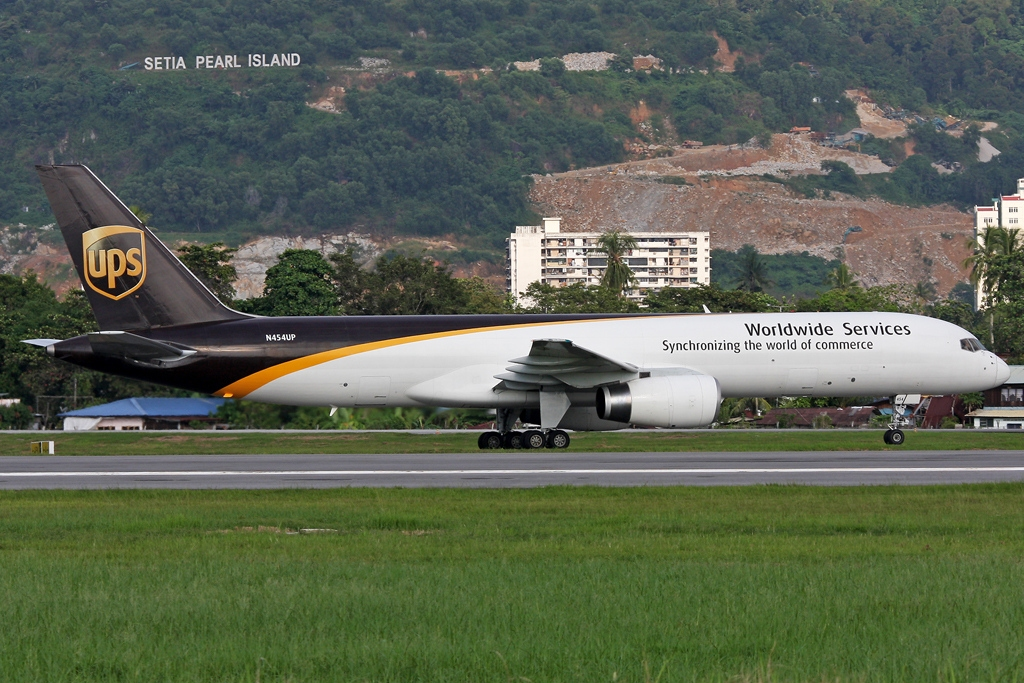
A Boeing 757-200PF in the former livery

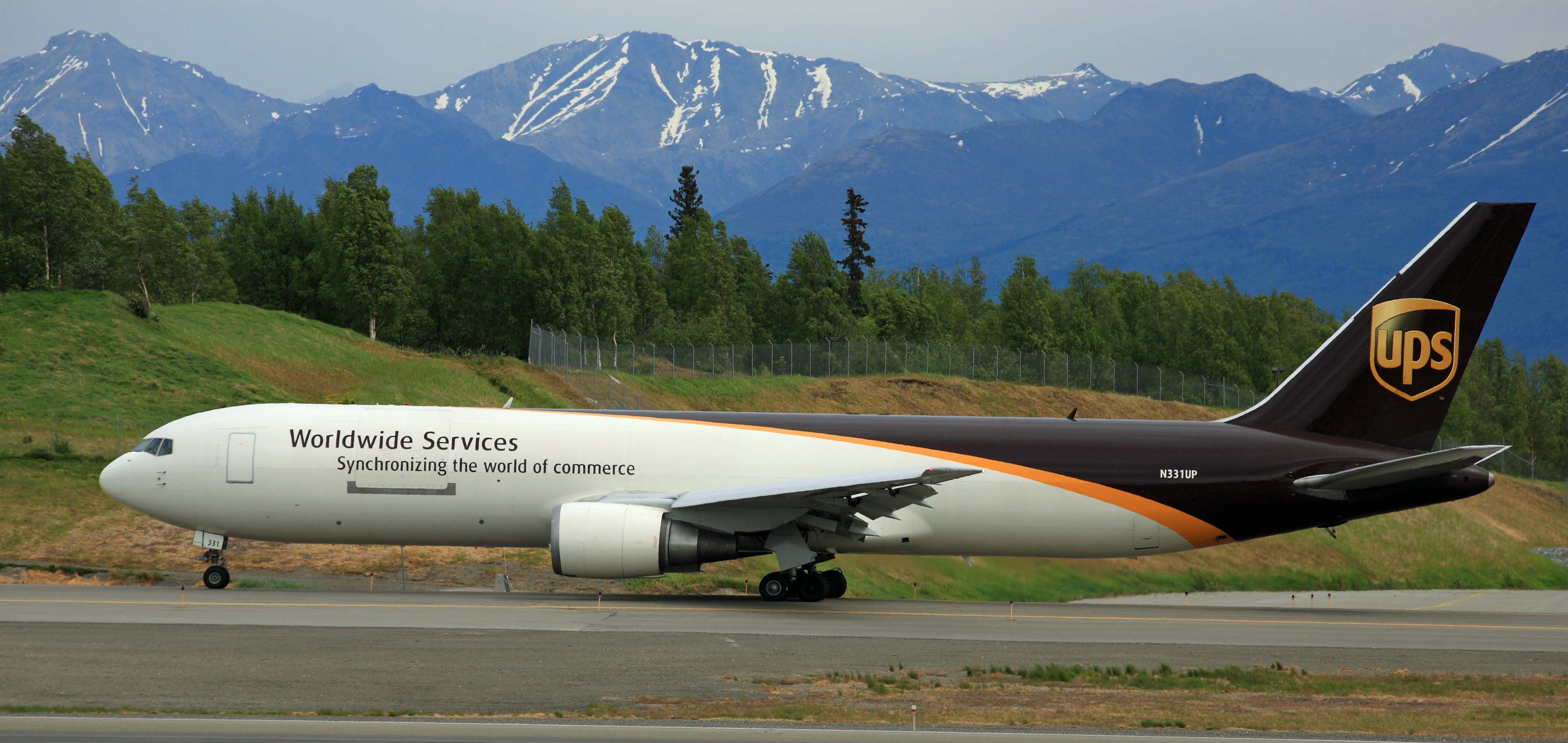
A Boeing 767-300F in the former livery

UPS Airlines fleet
| Aircraft | In service | Orders | Container capacity | | | Notes |
| Aircraft | In service | Orders | Upper | Lower | Total | Notes |
|---|---|---|---|---|---|---|
| Airbus A300-600RF | 52 | — | 22 | 7 | 29 | Retrofitted with new flight-deck avionics. Older aircraft to be retired. |
| Boeing 747-400F | 11 | — | 30 | 9 | 39 | |
| Boeing 747-400BCF | 2 | — | 30 | 9 | 39 | |
| Boeing 747-8F | 30 | — | 34 | 12 | 46 | Largest operator. |
| Boeing 757-200PF | 75 | — | 15 | — | 15 | Launch customer. |
| Boeing 767-300F | 102 | 7 | 24 | 7 | 31 | Launch customer. Deliveries until 2027. |
| Total | 272 | 7 | | | | |

=== Historical fleet ===
| Aircraft | Total | Introduced | Retired | Replaced by | Remarks |
|---|---|---|---|---|---|
| Boeing 727-100/QF | 51 | 1983 | 2007 | Boeing 757-200PF | Last commercial flight was in August 2007. |
| Boeing 727-200C/QC | 8 | 1985 | 2007 | Boeing 757-200PF | Last commercial flight was in August 2007. |
| Boeing 747-100F | 10 | 1984 | 2008 | Boeing 747-400F; McDonnell Douglas MD-11F | |
| Boeing 747-200F | 8 | 1986 | 2009 | Boeing 747-400F; McDonnell Douglas MD-11F | UPS received its first of its type on January 15, 1971. |
| Douglas DC-8-60F/70F | 53 | 1983 | 2009 | Boeing 747-400F; Boeing 757-200PF; McDonnell Douglas MD-11F | Last commercial flight was on May 11, 2009. One destroyed by fire as Flight 1307. |
| McDonnell Douglas MD-11F | 29 | 2001 | 2025 | Boeing 767-300F | All grounded after the crash of Flight 2976 and subsequently retired. |

=== Branding/livery ===
While UPS is distinguished by its UPS Brown delivery vehicles, to reduce heat absorption and save weight, brown has been reduced to a secondary color on UPS Airlines aircraft, with the primary color being Eurowhite. During its existence, the airline has used two liveries on its aircraft fleet. In line with the long-running UPS tradition of not displaying vehicle-manufacturer branding, UPS Airlines aircraft do not have any markings indicating aircraft type.

==== 1988–2003: United Parcel Service ====
From its 1988 formation to 2003, UPS Airlines used a bi-color brown and white livery on its aircraft. Most of the fuselage was painted white with the vertical stabilizer painted the same UPS Brown as its delivery vehicles. On the centerline of the fuselage, a brown cheatline was applied, above which were painted "United Parcel Service" titles.

==== 2003–2014: Worldwide Services: Synchronizing the world of commerce ====
In 2003, to commemorate the official name change of United Parcel Service to UPS, the company logo was given a redesign along with a redesign of the UPS Airlines livery. With nearly the entire fuselage painted white, the brown portion of the tail was changed to sweep above the rear fuselage, coming to a point near the front of the wing; the white and brown portions of the fuselage were separated by a gold stripe. In place of the "United Parcel Service" was painted in two lines: "Worldwide Services: Synchronizing the world of commerce". The only aircraft in the UPS Airlines fleet that did not adopt the "Worldwide Services" livery were the Boeing 747-100 and -200, along with the majority of the Boeing 727 fleet, as these aircraft were in the process of being phased out in the mid-2000s.

==== 2014–present: Worldwide Services ====
In 2014, in line with UPS delivery vehicles, UPS Airlines phased in a revised version of its "Worldwide Services" livery, removing the subtitle "Synchronizing the world of commerce" from the fuselage. The UPS emblem and gold body stripe painted brighter, with the gradient shading removed from the emblem. Along with aircraft entering service, the livery was phased into the airline fleet as aircraft underwent repainting for maintenance, with Dean Baldwin Painting at Grissom Aeroplex in Peru, Indiana (a 40-minute flight from Worldport) updating the exteriors.

== Operations ==
=== Hot-spare program ===
For much of its operating history, UPS Airlines has maintained a "hot-spare" contingency program to mitigate service disruptions caused by weather or mechanical issues. Similar in concept to the scrambling of military aircraft, the program allows a flight crew to depart with an empty aircraft within 30 minutes. At any given time, 14 aircraft are designated as hot spares across seven hubs, with all aircraft types except the Boeing 747 participating. Hot-spare aircraft are preflighted and fueled in advance. In 2014, UPS launched 275 hot-spare flights, keeping approximately 1.5 million packages on schedule and generating nearly $32 million in revenue.

=== Continuous descent approach (CDA) ===
As of 2009, UPS Airlines was experimenting with a Global Positioning System-based landing procedure, called continuous descent approach at the Worldport, replacing the traditional holding pattern and step-wise descent. CDA is used to reduce the time and fuel needed to approach a runway and land by eliminating the need to alternatively reduce and increase throttle to descend and level off. UPS Airlines estimates that this procedure saves an average of 250 to 465 lbs (110 to 210 kilograms) of fuel per flight. CDA is part of the Federal Aviation Administration's long-term "Next-Gen" air traffic control plan.

== Accidents and incidents ==
UPS Airlines has experienced three fatal crashes, which resulted in a total of nineteen fatalities.

| Flight number | Date | Registration | Aircraft type | Fatalities/Occupants | Notes | Ref. |
|---|---|---|---|---|---|---|
| 1307 | February 7, 2006 | N748UP | Douglas DC-8-71F | 0/3 | Destroyed by fire at Philadelphia International Airport. Just before landing, on a flight from Hartsfield-Jackson Atlanta International Airport, the crew reported a smoke detector activated in the cargo hold. After landing, the cargo hold of the aircraft caught fire. The source of the fire was never found. | |
| 6 | September 3, 2010 | N571UP | Boeing 747-44AF | 2/2 | Crashed near the Dubai Silicon Oasis at approximately 7:45 p.m. local time after declaring an emergency fifty minutes after takeoff due to fire in main cargo hold. Both crew members were killed, the first such casualties in UPS Airlines' history. NTSB reports the fire was started from the combustion of lithium-ion batteries on the main cargo deck, which quickly spread to all cargo despite depressurization of the aircraft. | |
| 1354 | August 14, 2013 | N155UP | Airbus A300F4-622R | 2/2 | Crashed in an open field on approach to Birmingham–Shuttlesworth International Airport in Birmingham, Alabama, killing both the captain and first officer. NTSB report cites pilot error as cause to the crash. Neither crew member had received adequate rest before the flight and missed a step in programing the FMC for the approach to the runway. | |
| 61 | June 6, 2016 | N277UP | McDonnell Douglas MD-11F | 0/4 | Suffered a runway excursion and nose gear collapse in a takeoff accident at Seoul-Incheon International Airport (ICN). Takeoff from runway 33L was aborted and the aircraft continued past the end of the runway. The nose gear collapsed and the no. 1 and 3 engines contacted the grass. The flight was bound for Ted Stevens Anchorage International Airport. Aircraft was written off. | |
| 2976 | November 4, 2025 | N259UP | McDonnell Douglas MD-11F | 3/3, plus 12 ground fatalities | Crashed on takeoff on November 4, 2025, at approximately 5:13 p.m. local time due to a separation of the number one (left) engine during the takeoff roll and subsequent inability to gain altitude. The crash occurred about half a mile south of Louisville Muhammad Ali International Airport. | |

== See also ==
- Air cargo – Any property carried or to be carried in an aircraft
- DHL Aviation – Aviation division of DHL Express
- FedEx Express – Cargo airline of the United States
- United Parcel Service (Parent company)
- UPS Flight Forward – Drone delivery subsidiary of UPS
