= UPS Airlines Flight 1354 =

2013 aviation accident in Alabama

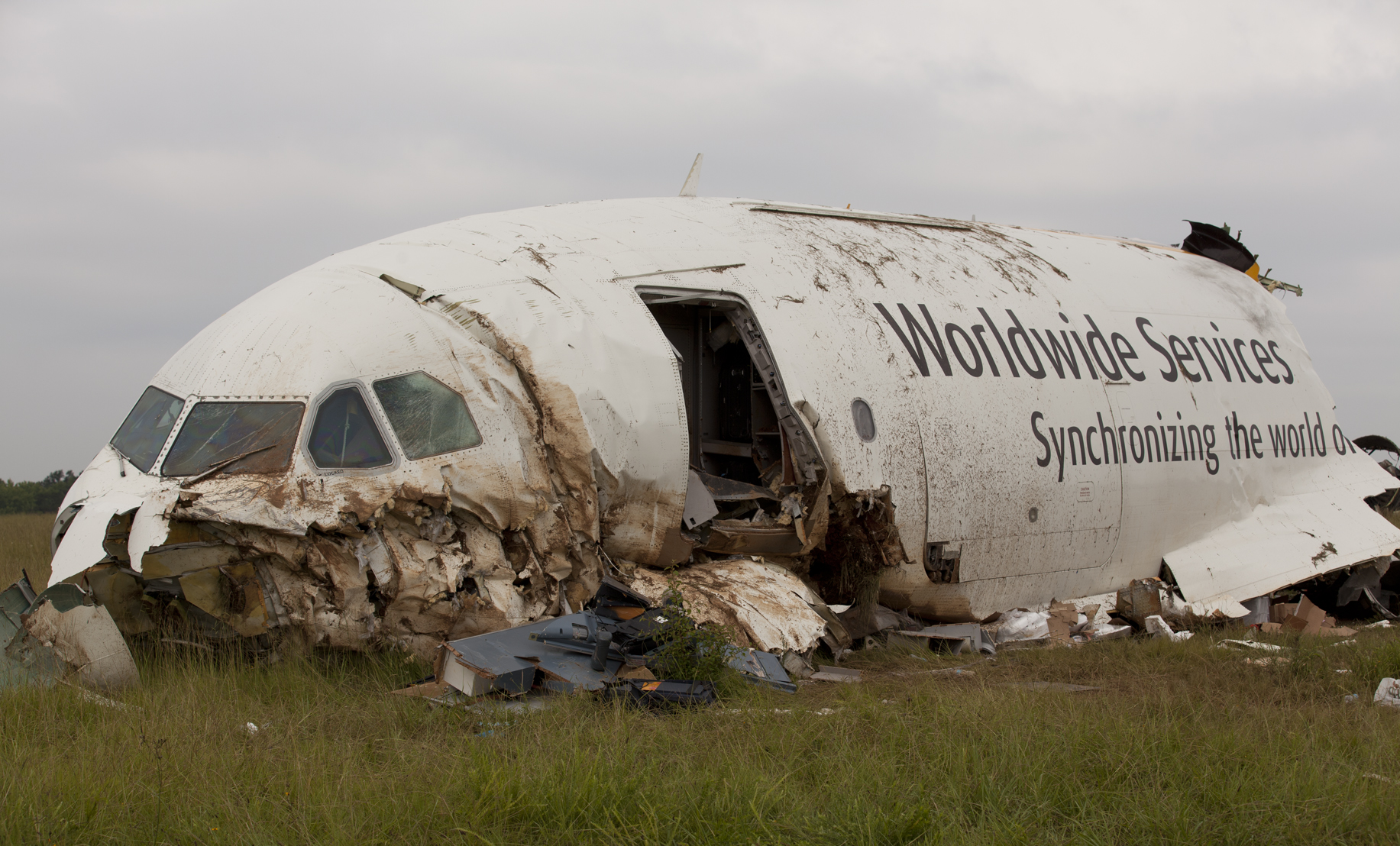
- Wreckage of the aircraft's cockpit section

Accident
- Date: August 14, 2013
- Summary: Controlled flight into terrain due to pilot error and pilot fatigue
- Site: North of Birmingham–Shuttlesworth International Airport, Alabama, United States; 33°35′11.7″N 86°44′49″W

Aircraft
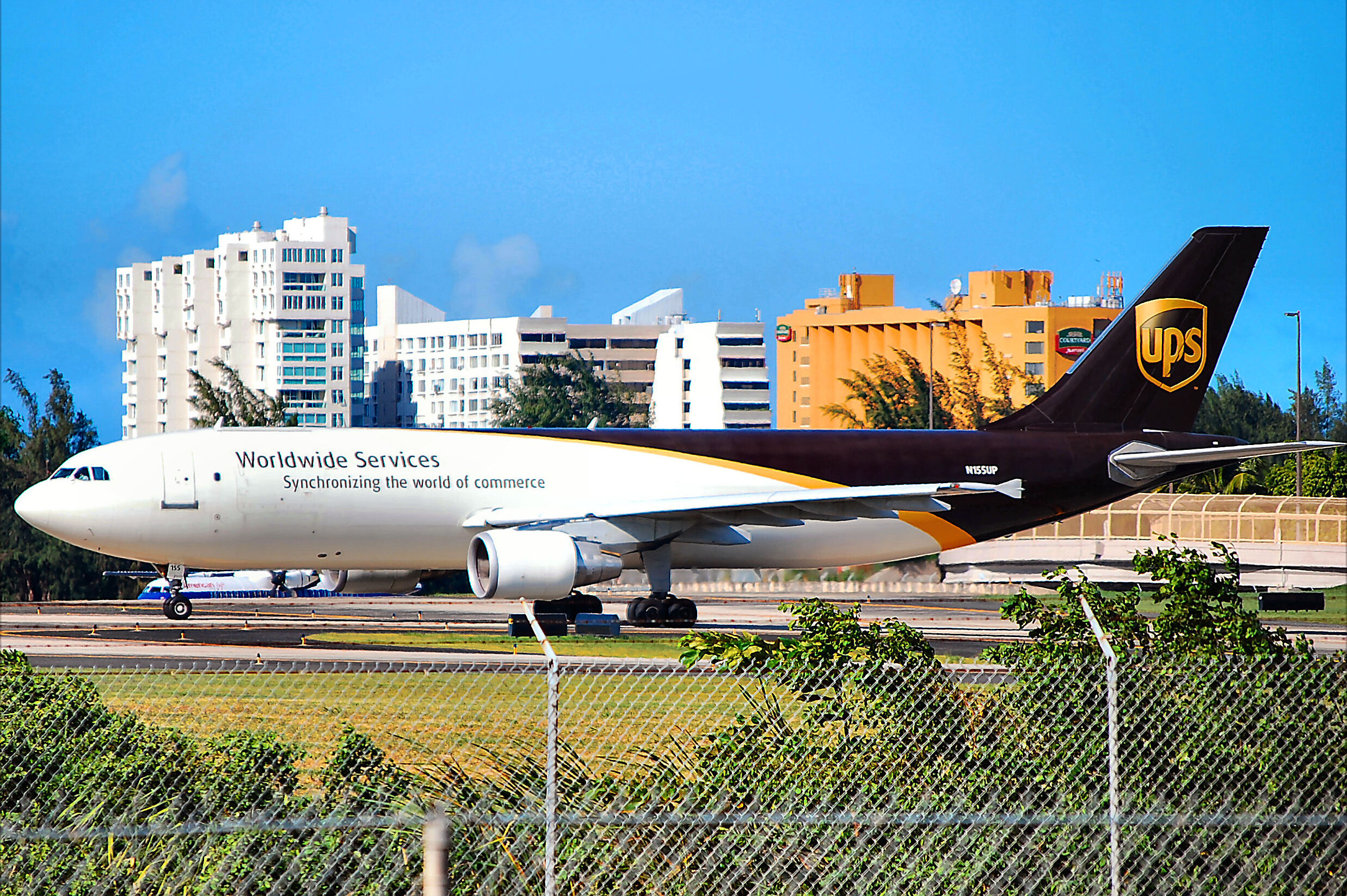
- N155UP, the aircraft involved in the accident, seen in 2009
- Aircraft type: Airbus A300F4-622R
- Operator: UPS Airlines
- IATA flight No.: 5X1354
- ICAO flight No.: UPS1354
- Call sign: UPS 1354
- Registration: N155UP
- Flight origin: Louisville International Airport, Kentucky, United States
- Destination: Birmingham–Shuttlesworth International Airport, Alabama, United States
- Occupants: 2
- Crew: 2
- Fatalities: 2
- Survivors: 0

UPS Airlines Flight 1354 was a scheduled cargo flight from Louisville, Kentucky, to Birmingham, Alabama. On August 14, 2013, the Airbus A300 flying the route crashed and burst into flames short of the runway on approach to Birmingham–Shuttlesworth International Airport. Both pilots were pronounced dead at the scene of the crash. They were the only people aboard the aircraft. It was the second fatal air crash for UPS Airlines.

== Background ==
=== Aircraft ===
The aircraft involved was a nearly 10-year-old Airbus A300F4-622R, registered as N155UP with serial number 841. It was built in 2003 and was delivered to UPS in February 2004. It was powered by two Pratt & Whitney PW4158 engines. At the time of the accident, it had accumulated about 11,000 flight hours in 6,800 flight cycles (a flight cycle is one takeoff and landing).

=== Crew ===
This flight was commanded by 58-year old Captain Cerea Beal, Jr. Prior to being hired by UPS, Beal was employed by TWA as a flight engineer and then first officer on the Boeing 727. He was hired by UPS in October 1990 as a 727 flight engineer and became a 727 first officer in August 1994. Twice, in 2000 and again in 2002, Beal began and then withdrew from training to upgrade to captain on the 757. He transitioned to the A300 as a first officer in 2004 and then as a captain in 2009. At the time of the accident, he had accumulated 6,406 flight hours at UPS, 3,265 of which were on the A300.

The first officer was 37-year-old Shanda Fanning. Fanning was hired by UPS in 2006 as a 727 flight engineer. She became a first officer on the Boeing 757 in 2007, then transitioned to the 747 in 2009. She began flying the A300 in June 2012. At the time of the accident, she had accumulated 4,721 total flight hours, including 403 hours on the A300.

== Accident ==
The aircraft was inbound on a scheduled flight at the time of the crash. Dark night visual flight rules prevailed at the airport, but variable instrument meteorological conditions with a variable ceiling were present north of the airport on the approach course.

A notice to airmen (NOTAM), in effect at the time of the accident, indicated that runway 06/24, the longest runway available at the airport and the only one with an ILS approach, would be closed from 04:00 to 05:00 CDT. Because the flight was scheduled to arrive at Birmingham at 04:51, only the shorter runway 18 with a non-precision approach was available to the pilots.

Forecasted weather at BHM indicated that the low ceilings upon arrival required an alternate airport, but the dispatcher did not discuss the low ceilings, the single-approach option to the airport, or the reopening of runway 06/24 about 05:00 with the flight crew. Further, during the flight, information about variable ceilings at the airport was not provided to the flight crew.

At 04:21:28, the cockpit voice recorder recorded the first officer stating, "they're sayin' six and two-four is closed. They're doin' the localizer to one eight," after the flight crew listened to BHM automatic terminal information service (ATIS) Papa, which included the 06/24 runway closure. The captain responded, "localizer (to) one eight, it figures." Between 04:23 and 04:30, the captain briefed the localizer runway 18 approach using the UPS Profile Briefing Guide from the UPS Aircraft Operating Manual (AFM). The captain then continued to review the localizer 18 approach chart. At no point did the captain or first officer mention that the localizer approach was not available.

At 04:33:33, air traffic control cleared the flight to descend to 11,000 feet (3,400 m) mean sea level (msl), and the captain commented, "They're generous today. Usually they kind'a take you to fifteen and they hold you up high." At 04:41:44, while flying level at 11,000 feet msl, the first officer contacted BHM approach control advising ATIS information and requesting a lower altitude. The BHM approach controller issued a descent clearance to 3,000 feet (910 m) and said, "uhm...runway six is still closed. you want...the localizer one eight?" The flight crew accepted the localizer 18 approach.

At 04:47:10.9, as the airplane passed the IMTOY stepdown fix near the minimum crossing altitude of 1,380 feet (420 m) msl, the captain said "two miles". However the airplane continued to descend at 1,500 feet per minute (460 m/min) and passed through and continued below the desired glidepath. As the airplane approached and then descended through the minimum descent altitude of 1,200 feet (370 m) msl, neither pilot made the required callouts regarding approaching and reaching the minimum descent altitude. At 04:47:19.6 the first officer said, "it wouldn't happen to be actual [chuckle]."

At an altitude of about 1,000 feet (300 m) msl, about 250 feet (76 m) above ground level, an enhanced ground proximity warning system (EGPWS) sink rate caution alert was triggered. About 1 second later, the captain began to reduce the selected vertical speed to about 600 feet per minute (180 m/min). The captain reported the runway in sight about 3.5 seconds after the sink rate caution alert, and the first officer then confirmed that she also had the runway in sight. About 2 seconds after reporting the runway in sight, the captain further reduced the selected vertical speed to 400 feet per minute (120 m/min). At 04:47:31.5, the captain disconnected the autopilot, and a second later, the cockpit voice recorder recorded the sound of rustling, corresponding to the airplane's first contact with trees. The recorder then recorded an EGPWS "too low terrain" caution alert and several additional impact noises until the recording ended.

The aircraft crashed around 04:47 local time (CDT, 09:47 UTC). It clipped trees and struck ground three times uphill. The fuselage broke apart, with the nose coming to rest about 200 yards (600 ft; 180 m) away from the initial point of impact, and the rest of it about 80 yards (240 ft; 70 m) farther down towards the runway and about 0.6 miles (1 km) from its edge and catching fire. Both crew members died in the accident.

== Investigation ==
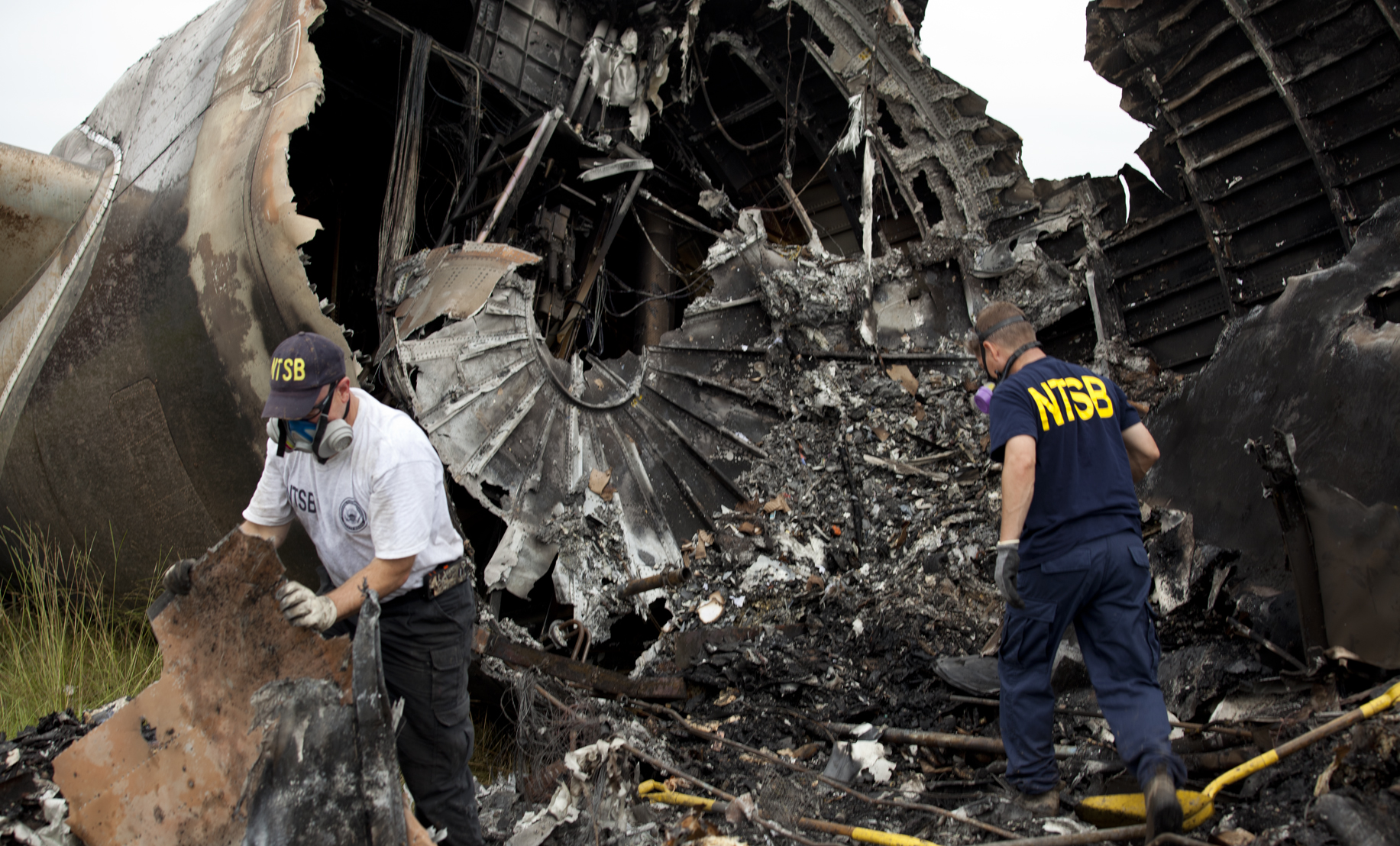
NTSB investigators examine the wreckage at the crash site

The National Transportation Safety Board (NTSB) launched an investigation and sent a 26-member go team to the crash site to collect perishable evidence. The cockpit voice recorder (CVR) and flight data recorder (FDR) were recovered on the following day and sent for analysis.

At their third media briefing on August 16, 2013, the NTSB reported that the crew had briefed the approach to runway 18 and were cleared to land by air traffic control two minutes prior to the end of the recording. At 16 seconds before the end of the recording, the aircraft's ground proximity warning system (GPWS) sounded two "sink rate" alerts, meaning that the aircraft was descending too rapidly. Three seconds later, Captain Beal reported having the runway in sight, which was confirmed by First Officer Fanning. The CVR recorded the sound of the first impact with trees 3 seconds after the pilots reported seeing the runway. A final "too low terrain" alert by the GPWS was then recorded, followed by the final sounds of impact.

To represent the country of manufacture, the French aviation accident investigation agency Bureau of Enquiry and Analysis for Civil Aviation Safety (BEA), assisted by Airbus technical advisors, participated in the investigation. Members of the FBI Evidence Response Team also assisted the NTSB. The NTSB stated in late August that no mechanical anomalies had yet been uncovered, but that the complete investigation would take several months.

On February 20, 2014, the NTSB held a public hearing in connection with its investigation. Excerpts from the CVR were presented, in which both the captain and first officer discussed their lack of sufficient sleep prior to the flight.

During the investigation, the NTSB examined fatigue as a factor in the pilot's decision making during the landing, noting that both pilots had been overly busy during their expected rest period in the hours immediately prior to their flight; conflicting squabbles on rest, between UPS and the Independent Pilots Association, led to the NTSB excluding them from the remainder of the hearing.

On September 9, 2014, the NTSB announced that the probable cause of the accident was that the aircrew had made an unstabilized approach into Birmingham–Shuttlesworth International Airport. They failed to adequately monitor their altitude and descended below the minimum descent altitude when the runway was not yet in sight, resulting in controlled flight into terrain about 3,300 feet (1,100 yd; 1,000 m) short of the runway threshold.

The NTSB also found that contributing factors in the accident were:

1. the flight crew's failure to properly configure and verify the flight management computer for the profile approach
2. the captain's failure to communicate his intentions to the first officer once it became apparent the vertical profile was not captured
3. the flight crew's expectation that they would break out of cloud at 1,000 feet [300 m] above ground level [due to incomplete weather information]
4. the first officer's failure to make the required minimums callouts
5. the captain's performance deficiencies, likely due to factors including, but not limited to, fatigue, distraction, or confusion, consistent with performance deficiencies exhibited during training
6. the first officer's fatigue due to acute sleep loss resulting from her ineffective off-duty time management

== Aftermath ==
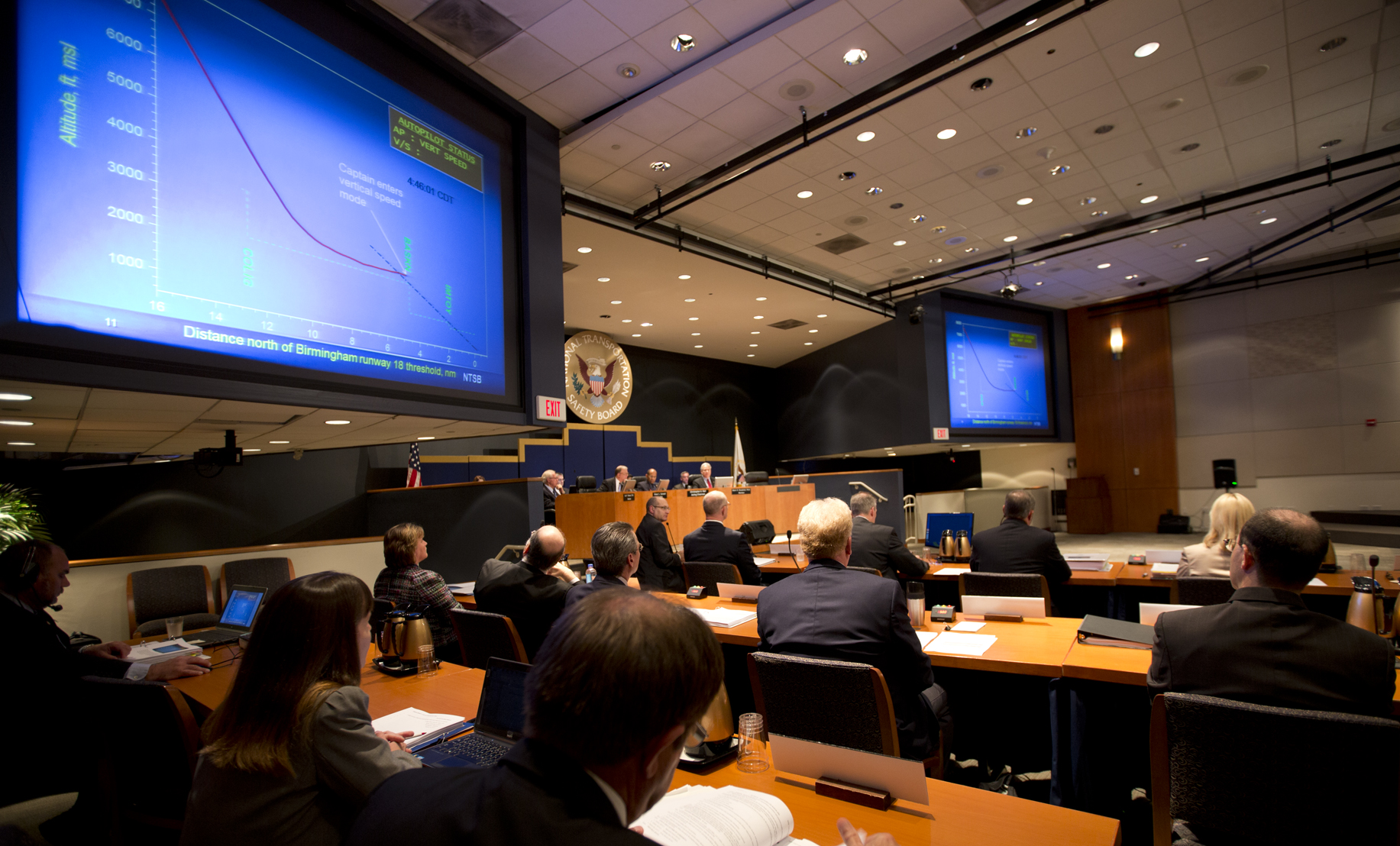
NTSB hearing on September 8, 2014

In 2014, the Independent Pilots Association filed suit against the FAA to end the cargo airplane exemption from the flight crew minimum rest requirements. In 2016, the lawsuit was dismissed by a Washington, DC, court, which determined the FAA had acted reasonably by excluding cargo airlines from the rest requirement based on cost-benefit analysis.

Bret Fanning, husband of First Officer Shanda Fanning, filed a lawsuit against Honeywell Aerospace in 2014, alleging that its GPWS installed on the A300 failed to alert the pilots that their aircraft was dangerously close to the ground. Fanning claimed that the GPWS did not sound an alarm until one second after the aircraft began to clip the tops of trees; however, the NTSB determined from the aircraft's FDR that the GPWS sounded a "sink rate" warning when the aircraft was 250 ft (76 m) above the ground, 8 seconds before the first impact with trees.

== In popular culture ==
The events of UPS Airlines Flight 1354 were featured in the 2021 episode "Deadly Delivery", of the Canadian documentary TV series Mayday.

== See also ==
- Trans-Colorado Airlines Flight 2286 – 1988 aviation accident in Colorado
- Flying Tiger Line Flight 066 – 1989 aviation accident in Malaysia
- Thai Airways International Flight 311 – 1992 aviation accident in Nepal
- Pakistan International Airlines Flight 268 – 1992 aviation accident in Nepal
- 1996 Croatia USAF CT-43 crash – 1996 aviation accident in Croatia
- Korean Air Flight 801 – 1997 aviation accident in Guam
- UPS Airlines Flight 6 – 2010 aviation accident in the United Arab Emirates
- Asiana Airlines Flight 214 – 2013 aircraft accident in California
- Air India Flight 171 – 2025 aviation accident in India
- UPS Airlines Flight 2976 – 2025 aviation accident in Louisville, Kentucky, US
