= Knopp, Louisville =

Neighborhood in Louisville, Kentucky

Coordinates: 38°08′55″N 85°44′08″W

Knopp, also known as Knopp-Melton, is a neighborhood of Louisville, Kentucky located along Grade Lane and Knopp Avenue. The area is mainly home to industrial and logistics businesses, especially that of UPS, whose Worldport is at Louisville Muhammad Ali International Airport to the north of the neighborhood.

The area was the site of the crash of UPS Airlines Flight 2976 on November 4, 2025.
