= UPS Airlines Flight 1307 =

2006 aviation accident involving a DC-8

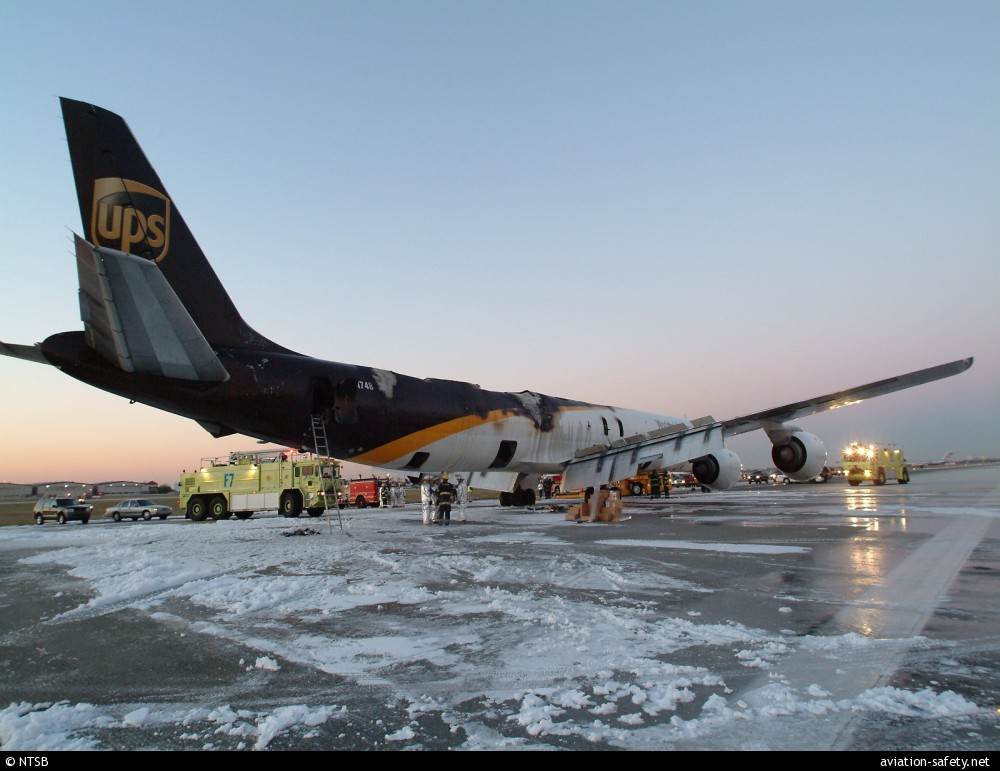
- Flight 1307 on the ground after the extinguishment of the fire.

Accident
- Date: February 7, 2006
- Summary: In-flight fire of undetermined origin in cargo hold
- Site: Philadelphia International Airport, Philadelphia, Pennsylvania

Aircraft
- N748UP, the aircraft involved in the accident in a previous livery
- Aircraft type: McDonnell Douglas DC-8-71F
- Operator: UPS Airlines
- IATA flight No.: 5X1307
- ICAO flight No.: UPS1307
- Call sign: UPS 1307
- Registration: N748UP
- Flight origin: Hartsfield–Jackson Atlanta International Airport, near Atlanta, Georgia
- Destination: Philadelphia International Airport, Philadelphia, Pennsylvania
- Occupants: 3
- Crew: 3
- Fatalities: 0
- Injuries: 3
- Survivors: 3

UPS Airlines Flight 1307 was a scheduled cargo flight from Hartsfield–Jackson Atlanta International Airport near Atlanta, Georgia to Philadelphia International Airport in Philadelphia, Pennsylvania. On the night of 7-8 February 2006, the Douglas DC-8 operating the flight experienced a cargo fire while descending towards Philadelphia; the fire destroyed the aircraft after landing, but only minor injuries, and no fatalities, occurred to the three crew on board.

== Accident ==
The flight proceeded normally until the descent towards Philadelphia. At 23:34 Eastern Standard Time, as the flight descended through flight level 310 southwest of Washington, D.C., the aircraft's cockpit voice recorder (CVR) recorded comments by the flight crew about an odor similar to burning wood. The captain briefly considered diverting the flight, but, as there was no evidence of a problem beyond the unusual odor, the flight crew decided to continue to their destination. (Note: Air cargo flights often experience unusual odors from benign sources (such as from carrying unusual cargo or flying over a forest fire); thus, the odor smelled by Flight 1307's flightcrew did not, in the absence of other indications of trouble, constitute evidence of an emergency situation or warrant a diversion.) Over the next several minutes, the flight crew attempted to troubleshoot the source of the odor, without success. At 23:54:42, with the aircraft on approach into Philadelphia and descending through an altitude of 3,600 feet above mean sea level (AMSL), the crew received a warning of smoke in the main cargo compartment. (Note: Like most freighter versions of passenger aircraft, the DC-8-71F has two types of cargo compartment: four lower cargo compartments, which are the same as the cargo compartments on an ordinary passenger airliner, and the main cargo compartment, which is in the place of the passenger cabin and is at least partially accessible from the cockpit in flight.) The flight was cleared for a visual approach and landing to runway 27R, the captain notified the Philadelphia local controller, who activated the airport's ARFF units to respond to a possible aircraft fire, and the flight crew donned their oxygen masks. Soon afterwards, at 23:55:57, the flight engineer reported a warning of a fire in one of the aircraft's aft lower cargo compartments, (Note: No fire damage was found in any of the four lower cargo compartments; the lower aft cargo fire warning was generated by infiltration of smoke from the fire in the main cargo compartment.) which was rapidly followed by the failure of the captain's EFIS. (Note: Additionally, between 2356:41 and 2357:59, the aircraft's flight data recorder ceased to record valid data for twelve of its seventeen recorded aircraft parameters; by the time the aircraft touched down, the only parameters for which valid data was still being recorded were magnetic heading, vertical and longitudinal acceleration, VHF microphone keying, and autopilot on/off.)

As the aircraft touched down on runway 27R at approximately 23:59, visible smoke began to enter the cockpit and rapidly thickened; by the time the flight crew finished shutting down the aircraft and evacuated on the runway, the smoke inside the cockpit was already so thick that the first officer could not see his hand in front of him while evacuating. At this time, both the flight crew and the responding ARFF personnel reported that there was smoke but no visible fire; the first observation of flames occurred at about 00:40, when firefighters opened the aircraft's right forward overwing hatch and saw fire between the tops of the cargo containers and the fuselage ceiling. ARFF personnel attempted to open the aircraft's main cargo door to allow them to remove cargo containers and attack the fire more directly, but had not been trained in the proper method of operating the door, and accidentally rendered the door inoperative when they attempted to force it open. Despite the firefighters' efforts, the crown of the fuselage burned through at about 02:00; the fire was eventually extinguished through internal and external attack with water and firefighting foam around 04:07.'

The plane's three crew members were taken to the University of Pennsylvania hospital, where they were treated for smoke inhalation. They were released at 4:00. The airport was shut down for firefighting operations until 6:00.

=== After the crash ===
During post-accident interviews, the captain stated that he considered diverting to another airport soon after the odor was first detected, but that he chose to continue to Philadelphia International Airport because there was no evidence of a problem, such as the illumination of the cargo smoke warning lights.

The first officer stated that the odor did not appear to be a threat because the flight engineer did not see any visible smoke; therefore, the first officer did not believe that there was any need to divert. Furthermore, the crew also stated that unusual odors could be common from non-threatening factors (such as flying over forest fires).

== Investigation ==
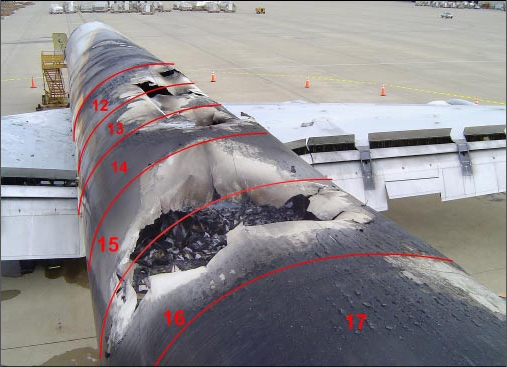
Fire damage to the crown of the aircraft's fuselage; the red markings indicate the areas of the fuselage crown overlying cargo containers 12 through 17.

=== Search for the cause of the fire ===
Once the aircraft was towed clear of the runway, work immediately began with the aim of finding the source of the fire. An electrical fire was quickly ruled out, as none of the aircraft's wiring exhibited damage from electrical arcing, the flightcrew never noticed any electrical burning odor, and no anomalies occurred in the aircraft's electrical systems until well after the start of the fire; as a result, the investigation focused on the aircraft's cargo. The four lower-lobe cargo compartments were intact, with their contents completely undamaged by fire (although the third compartment from the front was sooted behind the cargo compartment liner, and some pieces of melted material had also dripped down from the main deck into the areas behind the cargo liner). It was clear that the seat of the fire had been in the aircraft's main-deck cargo compartment; this had been loaded with seventeen cargo containers and one aluminium cargo pallet (with the pallet occupying the rearmost cargo position), numbered from front to back. Of the five forwardmost cargo containers, the container in position 4 was empty, and none of the contents of the other four containers showed any smoke or fire damage (although all the containers exhibited sooting from the fire, and all except the two forwardmost showed fire damage to the container itself). The contents of the cargo containers in positions 6 and 7 exhibited smoke damage and some singeing. From position 8 rearwards (aft of the aircraft's overwing exit hatches), the contents of all the containers and the pallet exhibited fire damage; the most severe fire damage to the cargo and the interior of the aircraft occurred between positions 12 and 17, with the lowest point of fire damage to the fuselage in the vicinity of position 12. (Note: Fires, including those on aircraft, tend to burn upwards rather than downwards; thus, the area where a fire originated can often be determined by finding where fire damage extends the lowest.)

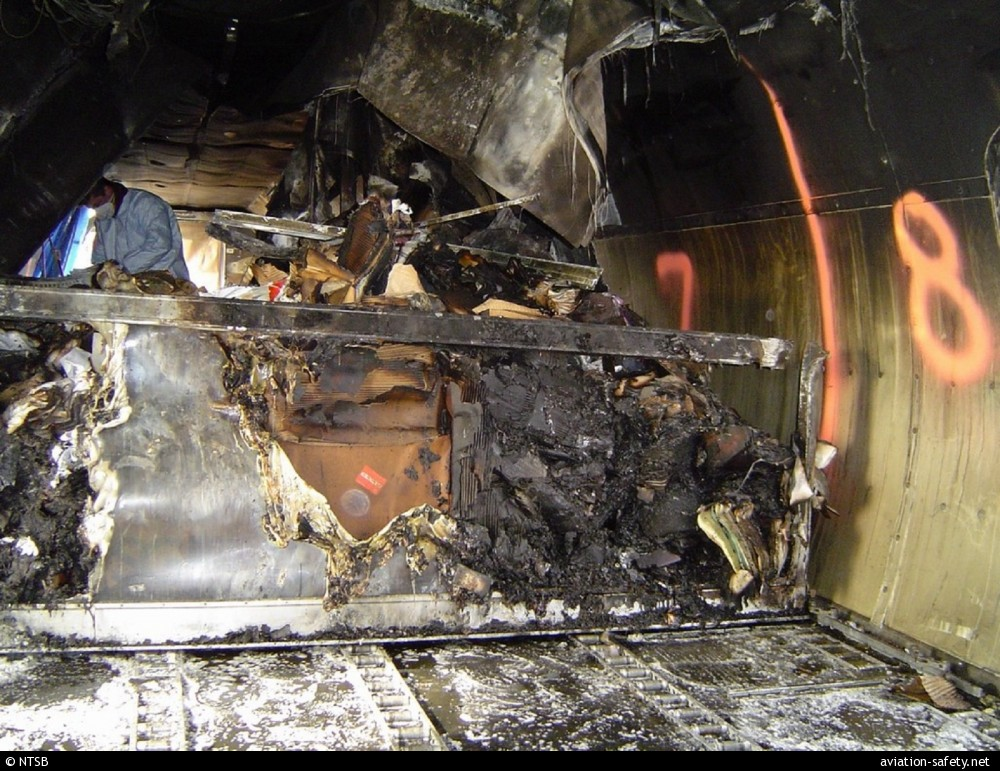
Fire damage to main-deck cargo and the interior of the main-deck cargo compartment.

The NTSB ruled out a fire origin in container 15, as all the container's contents were accounted for after the fire and none showed any signs of having been the source of the fire. Containers 16 and 17 were likewise ruled out, as the firefighters who first gained entry into the aircraft reported seeing no flames this far aft in the cargo compartment, but did report fire further forward, in the vicinity of containers 12 through 14; additionally, this area of the main-deck cargo compartment was directly above the lower-lobe compartment where the first smoke warning occurred during the flight. Numerous fire-damaged items were recovered from the main cargo compartment, including many items containing lithium-ion batteries and a flammable liquid. Lithium-ion batteries have been implicated in numerous instances of fires, both on aircraft and elsewhere; however, none of the items recovered could be definitively linked to the start of the fire.

=== In-flight fire-detection and extinguishment issues ===
The in-flight fire-detection system activated about 20 minutes after fire initiation, failing to meet FAA standards requiring detection within 5 minutes. Certification tests did not account for loaded cargo or cargo containers, which alter airflow and impede smoke movement, delaying detection. As a result, current certification methods do not ensure timely smoke detection under actual cargo-carrying conditions, raising concerns that fires—especially those producing limited smoke in-flightontainers—may not be promptly detected or effectively mitigated in flight.

=== Analysis of the decision to continue to Philadelphia ===
The NTSB considered whether the flightcrew's decision to continue to their destination of Philadelphia was prudent, or whether they should have diverted to a closer airport after they first noticed the burning odor. When the odor first became apparent, Flight 1307 was starting to descend in the vicinity of Washington, D.C.; the investigators concluded that, had the flightcrew immediately diverted the flight at this point, it could, potentially, have landed at Dulles Airport in northern Virginia, or at Baltimore/Washington Airport or Andrews AFB in Maryland, five to ten minutes sooner than at Philadelphia. However, they also noted that the flightcrew, in the absence of any smoke or fire warnings or system failures, would have had no reason to believe that a situation warranting a diversion existed.

== Aftermath ==
On December 17, 2007, concerning the incident, NTSB issued a safety recommendation for the performance requirements of smoke and fire detection systems to respond to the effects of cargo and cargo containers, and the installation of fire suppression systems in the cargo compartments of all cargo airplanes (under 14 Code of Federal Regulations Part 121)

On November 28, 2012, a file for safety recommendations was released in response to this incident and two fatal crashes (UPS Airlines Flight 6 and Asiana Airlines Flight 991)

== See also ==
- FedEx Express Flight 1406 - another inflight cargo fire of unknown origin on board a cargo aircraft
