= UPS Airlines Flight 2976 =

2025 aviation accident in Louisville, Kentucky, US

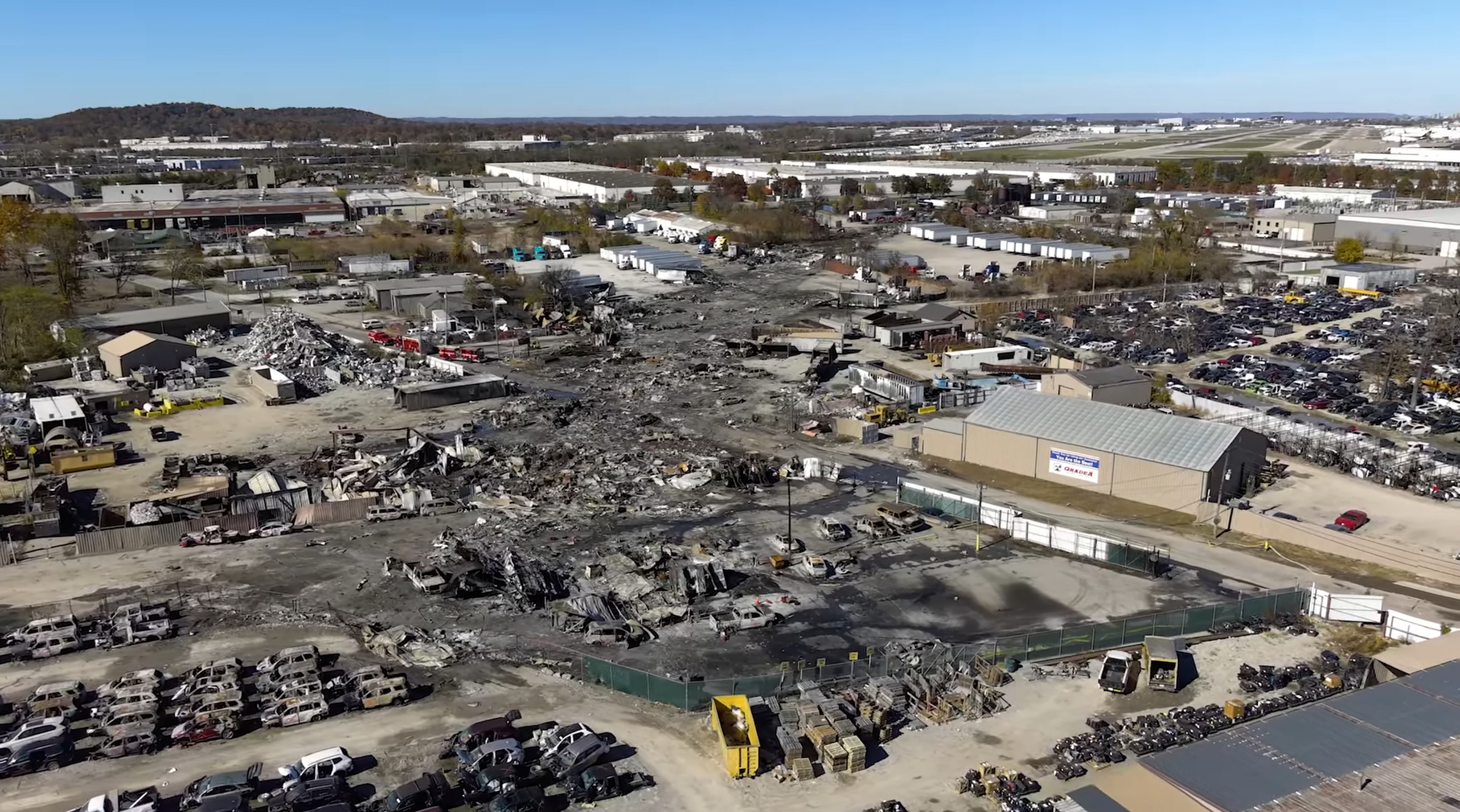
- Aerial view of the crash site

Accident
- Date: November 4, 2025
- Summary: Crashed shortly after takeoff following left engine detachment due to pylon failure, under investigation
- Site: Knopp, Louisville, Kentucky, United States; 38°08′50″N 85°44′04″W
- Total fatalities: 15
- Total injuries: 22

Aircraft
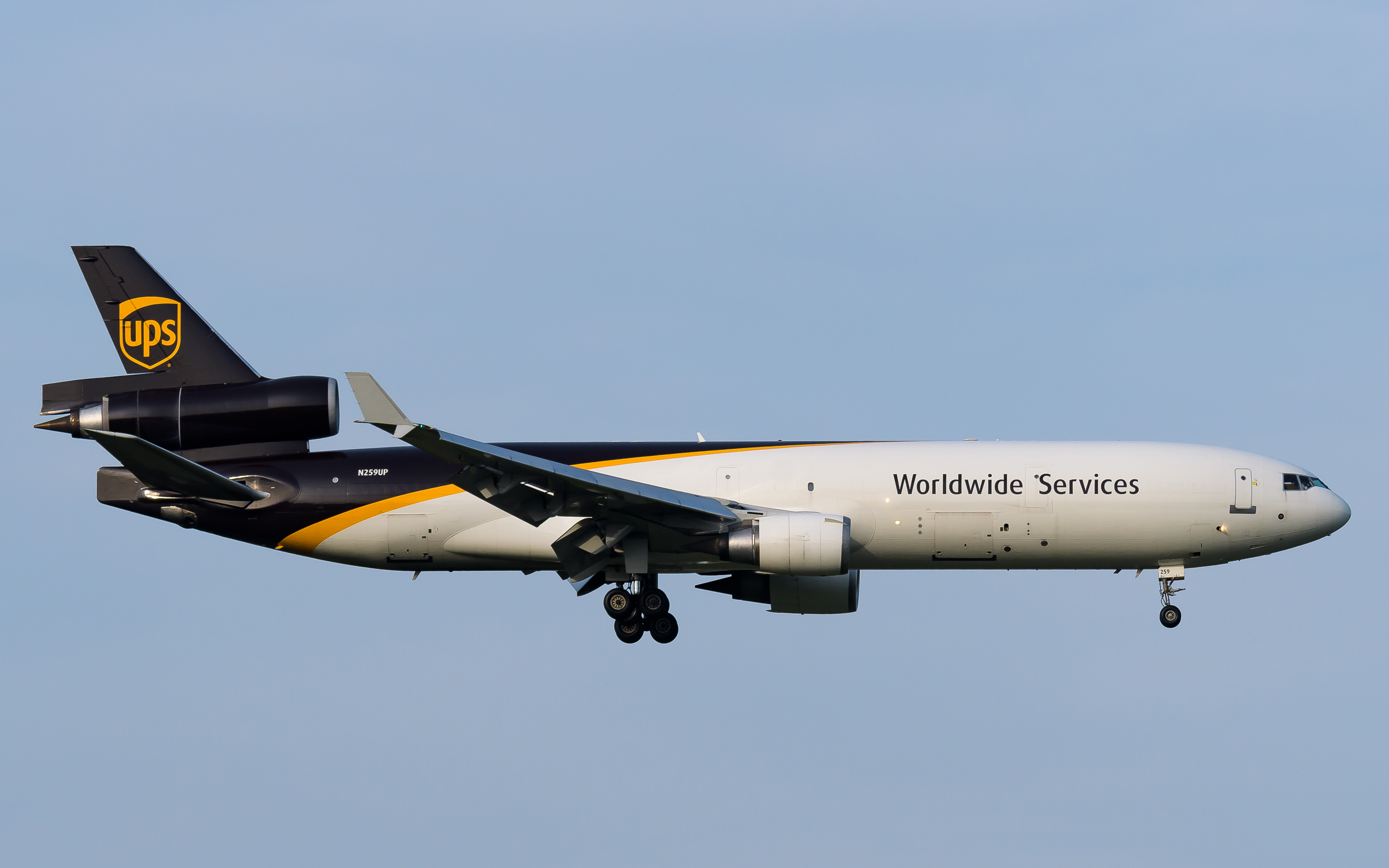
- N259UP, the aircraft involved in the accident, pictured in April 2025
- Aircraft type: McDonnell Douglas MD-11F
- Operator: UPS Airlines
- IATA flight No.: 5X2976
- ICAO flight No.: UPS2976
- Call sign: UPS 2976
- Registration: N259UP
- Flight origin: Louisville Muhammad Ali International Airport, Louisville, Kentucky, U.S.
- Destination: Daniel K. Inouye International Airport, Honolulu, Hawaii, U.S.
- Occupants: 3
- Crew: 3
- Fatalities: 3
- Survivors: 0

Ground casualties
- Ground fatalities: 12
- Ground injuries: 22

UPS Airlines Flight 2976 was a scheduled domestic cargo flight in the United States from Louisville Muhammad Ali International Airport in Louisville, Kentucky, to Daniel K. Inouye International Airport, Honolulu, Hawaii. On November 4, 2025, the McDonnell Douglas MD-11 was taking off from runway 17R when the left engine and engine pylon broke off of the wing. The aircraft then crashed into an industrial area south of the runway seconds after liftoff. The crash killed all three crew members on board the aircraft and twelve people on the ground.

The accident is being investigated by the National Transportation Safety Board. Following the accident, UPS retired its remaining MD-11 fleet in January 2026.

== Background ==
=== Airline ===
UPS Airlines is the United States' second-largest cargo airline (after FedEx Express). Founded in 1988, the company had experienced only two fatal accidents before Flight 2976: UPS Airlines Flight 6 in 2010 and UPS Airlines Flight 1354 in 2013, each of which killed two people (two crew members on board in each case).

Flight 2976 was a scheduled domestic cargo flight, operated by UPS Airlines from its hub in Louisville Muhammad Ali International Airport in Louisville, Kentucky, to Daniel K. Inouye International Airport in Honolulu, Hawaii, an 8.5-hour flight.

=== Aircraft ===
The aircraft involved in the accident, seen in the colors of its previous operator, Thai Airways International in 2004

The aircraft, N259UP, was a 34-year-old McDonnell Douglas MD-11F, first delivered to Thai Airways International in 1991 with the registration HS-TME, after which it was converted to a cargo aircraft and delivered to UPS Airlines in 2006. It had flown 21,043 cycles and for about 92,992 hours, and was equipped with three General Electric CF6-80C2D1F turbofan engines. The last visual inspections of the left pylon aft mount were performed in October 2021. More rigorous "Special Detailed Inspections" for the mount lugs and wing clevis were not yet due, as the aircraft's 21,043 accumulated cycles were well below the 28,000 and 29,200 cycle thresholds required for those checks. NTSB revealed in May 2026 that Boeing asked the FAA to increase the inspection interval for the lugs from 19,900 to 29,200 flight cycles even though it had received five reports of the spherical bearing, which is housed within the lugs, fracturing long before the aircraft hit its designated inspection interval. Two months before the crash, it had been grounded for six weeks to repair a cracked fuel tank, and corrosion was later found along two structural beams in the fuselage. The aircraft re-entered service a few weeks before the crash.

=== Crew ===
The crew consisted of Captain Richard Wartenberg (57), a retired U.S. Air Force lieutenant colonel who served with the 445th Airlift Wing, and was the pilot monitoring. He had accumulated about 8,613 total flight hours, including 4,918 in the MD-11. First officer Lee Truitt (45) was the pilot flying and had accumulated about 9,200 total hours, including 994 in the MD-11. Relief officer Dana Diamond (62) had accumulated about 15,250 total flight hours, including 8,775 in the MD-11.

== Accident ==
The aircraft took off from runway 17R, heading south, at about 5:13 p.m. EST (UTC−5). Weather at the time was clear, with wind at 6 knots (11 km/h; 7 mph) from the southeast with visibility of 10 miles (16 km). According to initial flight tracking data, the aircraft reached an altitude of 175 feet (53 m) and a maximum ground speed of 186 knots (344 km/h; 214 mph).

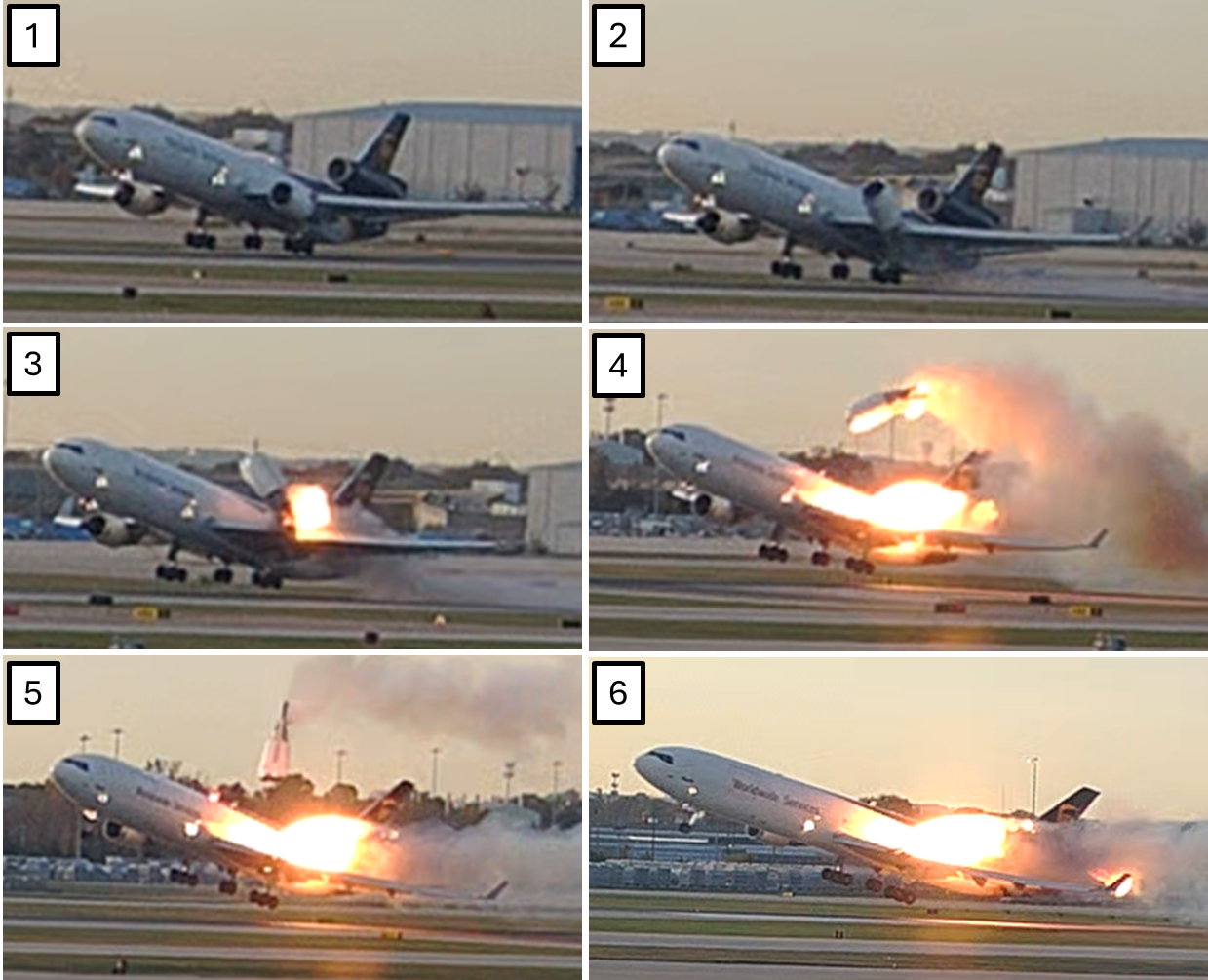
Still images showing the left engine separating from the wing of the aircraft, from surveillance footage obtained by the NTSB

During takeoff, shortly after rotation, the left engine, with most of its pylon still attached, separated from the wing and flipped backwards over the wing's leading edge. As it detached, a fire ignited on the engine, and it tumbled up and over the aircraft, coming to rest on the grass on the right side of runway 17R. A fire also broke out near the left pylon attachment point and continued to burn until impact. The aircraft subsequently entered a descent.

The jet's left main landing gear struck the roof of a UPS Supply Chain warehouse, leaving a 300-foot (90 m) gash. Its already damaged left wing then ignited a stand of approximately 288,000 gallons (around 1,090 cubic meters) of fuel tanks containing recycled heavy fuel oils, motor oil, cutting fluid, and hydraulic fluid at a Kentucky Petroleum Recycling company tanks farm, causing the left wing to immediately disintegrate. Finally, while inverted a full left bank, the aircraft impacted the auto scrapyard section of Grade A Auto Parts and disintegrated upon explosion. The debris and burning industrial oils spread in the impact field stretched approximately 3,000 feet (900 m) south-southeast from the UPS warehouse. The flight was not carrying hazardous cargo.

Video analysis indicates that the tail-mounted engine also experienced a malfunction, with bursts of flame seen from the exhaust. Aviation experts have suggested that debris from the detached engine may have been ingested into the tail engine, inducing a compressor stall and thus causing the engine to surge, but this is yet to be confirmed by the NTSB.

Multiple buildings were set on fire or destroyed, with reports of people trapped inside.

The crash viewed from a surveillance camera

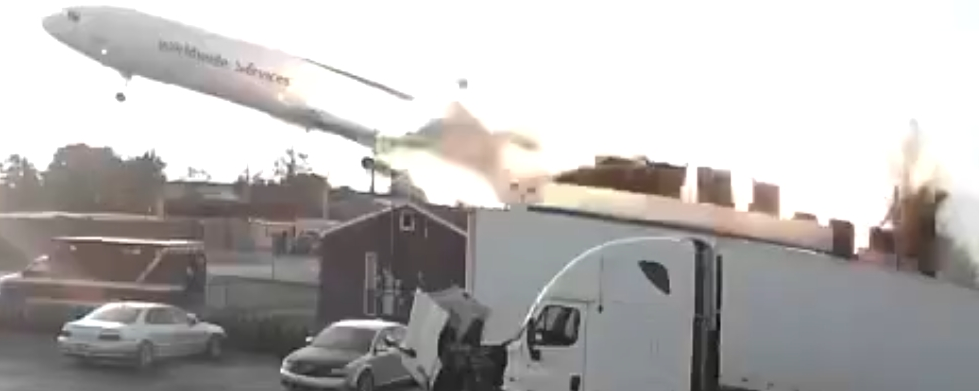
UPS 2976 moments before crashing

== Victims ==
The crash was the deadliest in UPS Airlines history, killing fifteen people: all three crew members on board the aircraft and another twelve on the ground. The dead included a three-year-old child and her grandfather. As of November 20, 2025, twenty-three people were known to have suffered injuries, two of which were described as "serious" and twenty-one as "minor". On December 25, 2025, Mayor Greenberg announced that a man who sustained severe injuries had died, raising the death toll to fifteen.

=== Timeline of identification ===
Two employees of the auto yard were initially reported as unaccounted for, and it was unknown how many customers were on the premises at the time. Fifteen families initially reported missing relatives. On November 6, Louisville Mayor Craig Greenberg reported that six of the missing had been accounted for, leaving nine still missing. Two days later, Greenberg said that the missing people were believed to have been found.

The day after the crash, a spokesperson reported that fifteen people had been treated at UofL Health facilities, all but two of whom had been discharged.

== Aftermath ==
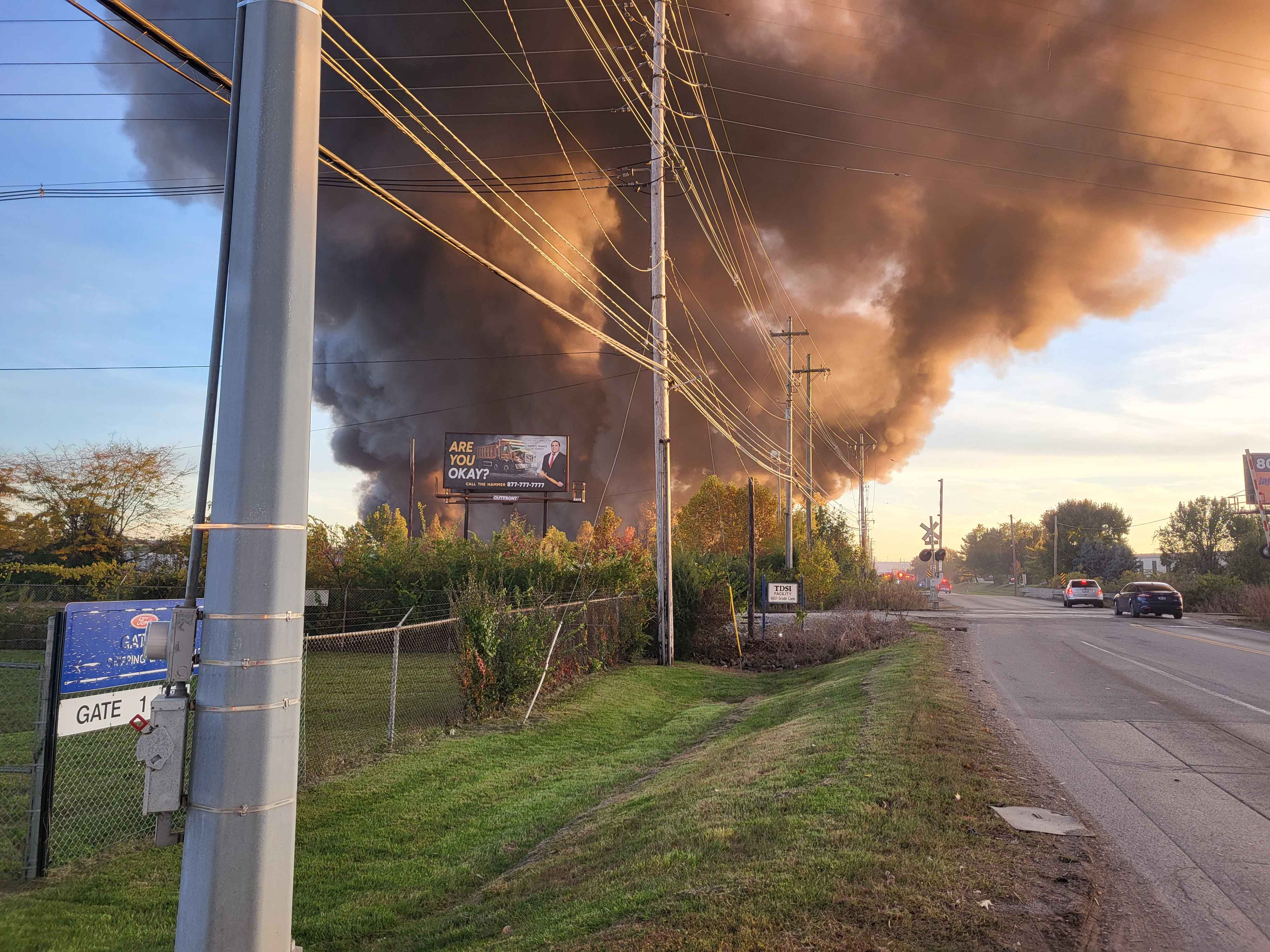
Smoke plume viewed from the ground

All flights to and from the airport were immediately canceled. Louisville-Jefferson County Emergency Management issued a shelter-in-place order centered on the airport with a radius of 5 miles (8 km). This was later reduced to 1 mi (1,600 m). Wireless Emergency Alert messages were issued to those in the shelter-in-place area. At the last briefing of the day, Mayor Greenberg said that more than 100 firefighters were at the scene. Local police officials said families should not seek loved ones at hospitals, to avoid overwhelming them, but to visit a reunification center at the police training academy. UPS temporarily suspended operations at its Worldport air hub. The fire was nearly contained by 10:30 p.m., freeing up first responders to search for victims. All public schools in the Jefferson County School District were closed the day after the crash.

The radius of the shelter-in-place order was reduced a second time, effective at 7:30 a.m. on November 5, centered near 7501 Grade Lane, to 1/4 mi (400 m). The Louisville Metro Government set up a website for people to report and document debris, which they were urged not to touch, and numerous departures were delayed or canceled. At 7:40 a.m., Louisville International Airport announced that Runway 11/29 was open. UPS resumed operations from Louisville later that day. The incident runway, 17R/35L, was reopened around 4:45 p.m. EST on November 6, returning the airfield to full operational status.

On November 8, UPS, FedEx, and Western Global Airlines temporarily grounded their respective MD-11 fleets "out of an abundance of caution" following instructions from their manufacturer, Boeing (inherited from McDonnell Douglas). At the time of the incident, UPS operated 26 MD-11s, a small fraction of its fleet of over 500 aircraft, while FedEx had 28 MD-11s in a fleet of more than 700. The Federal Aviation Administration (FAA) issued an emergency airworthiness directive (EAD) for MD-11 aircraft requiring inspections and any applicable corrective actions before flight. On November 14, the FAA issued an EAD grounding the DC-10, the MD-11's predecessor aircraft, for the same reason.

The temporary grounding of the MD-11 fleet disrupted overnight cargo operations at several major U.S. airports, including Memphis, Dallas–Fort Worth, and Ontario, California, causing short-term delays in supply chains reliant on express freight. The incident occurred during the 2025 federal government shutdown, which strained staffing at aviation agencies and led regulators to impose traffic reductions and operational limits. Observers stated that these conditions complicated logistics and could slow non-urgent investigatory and regulatory work. Industry and government sources urged expedited inspections to minimize economic losses.

On January 27, UPS announced the complete retirement of the MD-11 from its fleet and recorded a charge of $137 million. FedEx retired five MD-11 freighters in its fiscal year ending May 31, 2026.

On May 11, the FAA lifted its grounding order, clearing the MD-11 to return to service.

=== Lawsuits ===
Morgan & Morgan announced the first lawsuit filed by two plaintiffs against UPS, Boeing, and the General Electric Company for negligence in federal court on November 7. The first plaintiff is claimed to have suffered smoke inhalation; the second plaintiff is claimed to have suffered from property damage to two of his businesses.

On December 3, 2025, Clifford Law Offices and Sam Aguiar Injury Lawyers announced lawsuits against UPS, Boeing, General Electric, and VT San Antonio Aerospace, alleging negligence by UPS. On December 12, ST Engineering was added to the lawsuit. On December 17, another lawsuit was filed against UPS on behalf of another victim. On August 17, 2026, Trinidad Chavez's family received compensation from Clear Path Insurance, which represents the defendants in the Clifford and Aguiar lawsuit.

On January 23, 2026, the Clifford Law Firm and attorney Sam Aguiar also announced another lawsuit filed against the same defendants on behalf of the family of Alain Rodriguez Colina, who was injured from the crash and later died on Christmas Day. The lawsuit seeks damages for criminal negligence. Also, Texas law firms filed in the county court a lawsuit on behalf of Carlos Arias Fernandez, against ST Engineering.

The wife of Captain Dana Diamond, the relief officer who died in the UPS air crash, filed a lawsuit against The Boeing Company, General Electric, and ST San Antonio Aerospace through the Lanier Law Firm in Jefferson County on February 25, 2026.

Peterson Law and Whiteford Taylor & Preston represent the vast majority of crash victims, filing fifteen comprehensive lawsuits on May 7, 2026, in Jefferson County Circuit Court on behalf of more than 100 individuals and multiple businesses affected by the crash. The lawsuits name UPS, Boeing Company, General Electric, VT San Antonio Aerospace, multiple insurance companies, and the estate of Captain Richard R. Wartenberg as defendants, alleging negligence and seeking damages for wrongful death, catastrophic injuries, and business destruction.

On July 13, 2026, the Alex R. White Lawyers PLLC law firm sued UPS and others for criminal negligence on behalf of the family of the deceased estate of Matthew Hagan Sweets, which seeks damages for trauma, wrongful death, mental anguish, and loss of consortium.

On October 19, 2026, lawyers met in court conference to discuss potential consolidated cases. On October 21, 2026, the lawsuit against Captain Richard's estates was dropped.

== Investigation ==
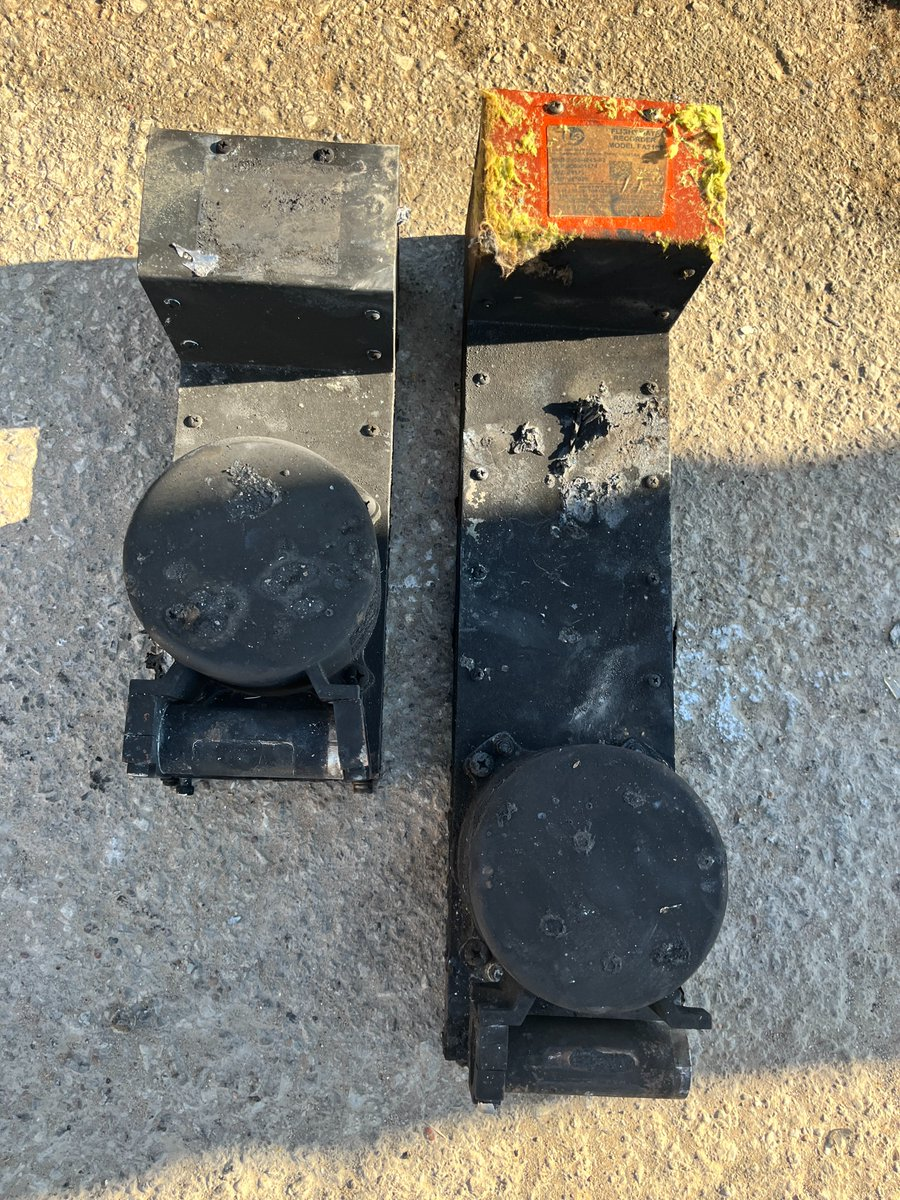
The charred cockpit voice recorder (left) and flight data recorder (right) pictured the day after the crash

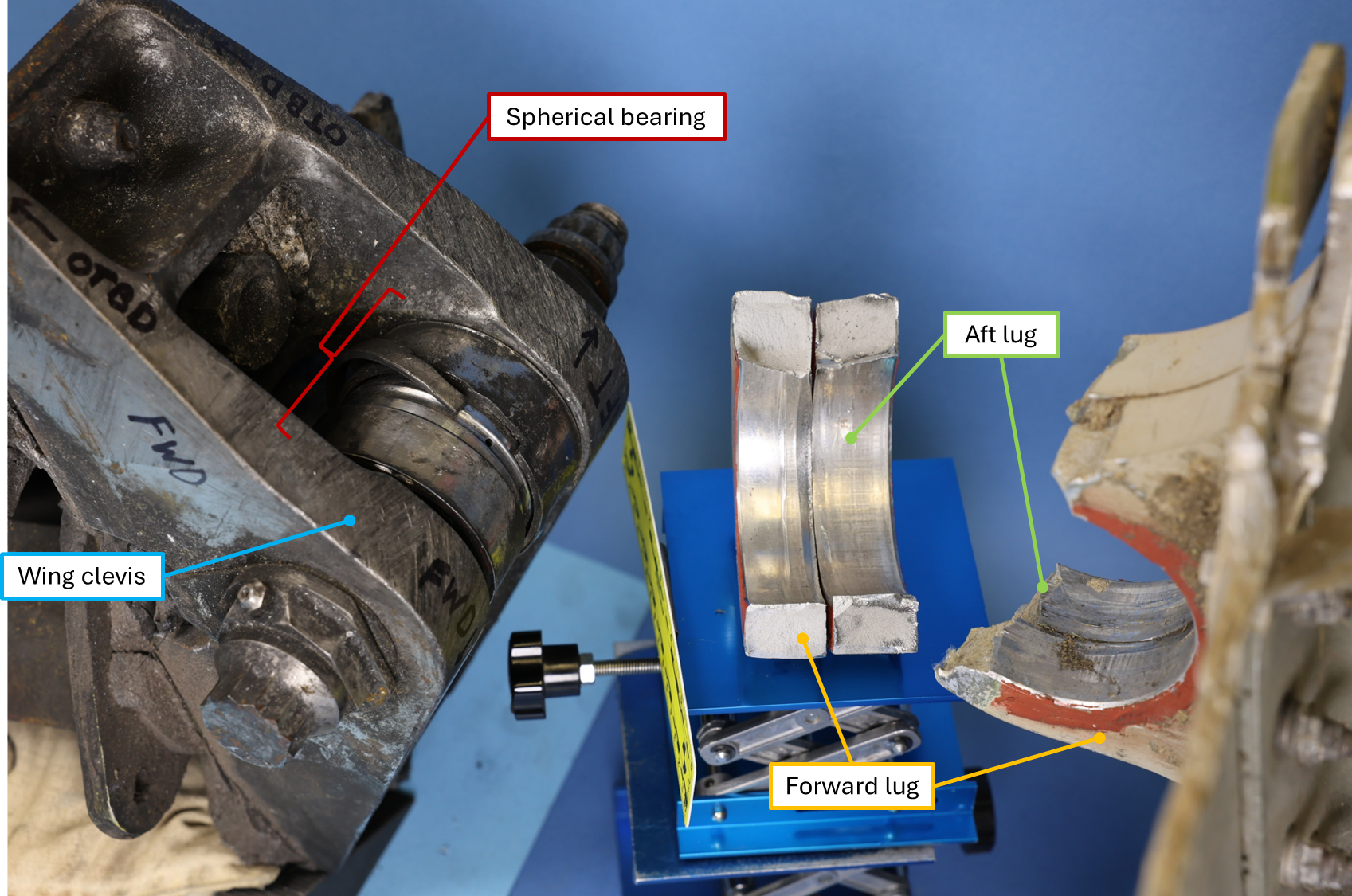
Pieces recovered from the accident: on the left is the fitting where the engine is attached to the wing, on the right are the fractured lugs of the engine pylon

The National Transportation Safety Board (NTSB) investigated the crash along with the Federal Aviation Administration (FAA). The NTSB launched a go-team of 28 personnel. At a media briefing held on November 5, with board member Todd Inman serving as the on-scene spokesperson, they announced the recovery of the cockpit voice recorder (CVR) and flight data recorder. UPS Airlines announced it was in close contact with and cooperating with the NTSB and the FAA.

On November 6, NTSB officials announced that the last ADS-B message, received at 5:13:32 p.m. EST (UTC−5), showed the aircraft had reached a maximum speed of 183 knots (339 km/h; 211 mph) and an altitude of 475 feet (145 m) above sea level, only ten feet (3 m) above ground level. They also said they had downloaded the flight's data from the cockpit voice recorder and flight data recorder. An NTSB spokesman said the CVR audio contained a persistent bell sound.

On November 20, the NTSB released their preliminary report on the accident. The report stated that the cracks had been found in the left pylon resulting from metal fatigue—specifically, inspection of the pylon showed fatigue cracks on both fracture surfaces of the aft mount's aft lug and along the bore of the aft mount forward lug's inboard fracture surface. However, no deformation or pre-existing fractures were found in the forward top flange of the aft mount assembly. The report also noted the crash of American Airlines Flight 191 in 1979 (involving a DC-10 with very similar engine mounts), which had crashed under similar circumstances.

On January 14, 2026, the NTSB released an update stating that all engine data recorded by the FDR was normal until 17:13:11 and fatigue cracks were found in engine no. 1's spherical bearing assembly.

In May 2026, the NTSB revealed that Boeing asked the FAA – in 2014 – to increase the allowed inspection interval for the lugs from 19,900 to 29,200 flight cycles even though it had received five reports of the spherical bearing, which is housed within the lugs, fracturing long before the aircraft hit its designated inspection interval. In two cases, the spherical bearing fractured before reaching 15,000 flight cycles; in the other three, the bearing fractured under 10,000 flight cycles.

== See also ==
- 2025 in aviation
- List of accidents and incidents involving airliners in the United States § Kentucky
- List of aircraft accidents and incidents by number of ground fatalities
