= Independent Pilots Association =

American air pilots' union

IPA
- Independent Pilots Association
- Founded: January 10, 1990
- Headquarters: Louisville, Kentucky.
- Location: United States
- Members: 3200
- Key people: Robert Travis, President
- Affiliations: Coalition of Airline Pilots Associations
- Website: www.ipapilot.org

The Independent Pilots Association (IPA) is the union representing the collective bargaining interests of over 3000 airline pilots employed by United Parcel Service (UPS). The organization was founded in 1990 and is headquartered in Louisville, Kentucky, where UPS's main air hub is located.

== Background and origin ==
The Independent Pilots Association was established on the 10th of January, 1990, with the objective of serving as a mutual interests organization for professional pilots working for the United Parcel Service. Many pilots under UPS shared a consensus in doing so within years beforehand, before it finally arrived at fruition throughout the year before its foundation.

== IPA Foundation ==
During the association's early stages, the IPA leadership felt it was relevant for the membership to be publicly represented in a philanthropic endeavour. This led to the Independent Pilots Association Foundation, or IPA Foundation, being formed in late 1993. The IPA Foundation formally became active in 1994, having functioned as distinguished from the IPA itself, financially sustained via members' donations. As a separate entity, the IPA Foundation conforms to existing labour laws as well as sec. 501(c)(3) of the IRS code. The organization has become tax-exempt in recent years.

== Affairs ==
The IPA outlines its government mission statement as to "promote global aviation safety and security and encourage continued economic growth for the aviation industry". The IPA is a member of The Coalition of Airline Pilots Associations - CAPA.

The IPA has filed suit on December 22, 2011, against the FAA to mandate new rest and duty regulations apply to all cargo airlines as well as passenger airlines.

The IPA operates under §501(c)(5) of the Internal Revenue Code. The organization is tax-exempt.

The IPA has outlined their endorsement of improving airline safety regulation as regards to lithium batteries in their "Safer Skies" programme.

== Historical actions ==
The association honored the picket lines when the Teamsters went on strike in 1997 for 16 days.
