= Los Angeles International Airport =

Airport serving Los Angeles, California, United States

- Aerial view of LAX
- IATA: LAX; ICAO: KLAX; FAA LID: LAX; WMO: 72295

Summary
- Airport type: Public
- Owner/Operator: Los Angeles World Airports
- Serves: Greater Los Angeles
- Location: Westchester, Los Angeles, California, U.S.
- Opened: October 2, 1928; 98 years ago
- Hub for: Alaska Airlines; American Airlines; Atlas Air; Delta Air Lines; Kalitta Air; Polar Air Cargo; United Airlines
- Focus city for: JetBlue
- Operating base for: Southwest Airlines
- Time zone: PST (UTC−08:00)
  - Summer (DST): PDT (UTC−07:00)
- Elevation AMSL: 39 m (128 ft)
- Coordinates: 33°56′33″N 118°24′29″W
- Public transit access: LAX/Metro Transit Center
- Website: www.flylax.com

Maps
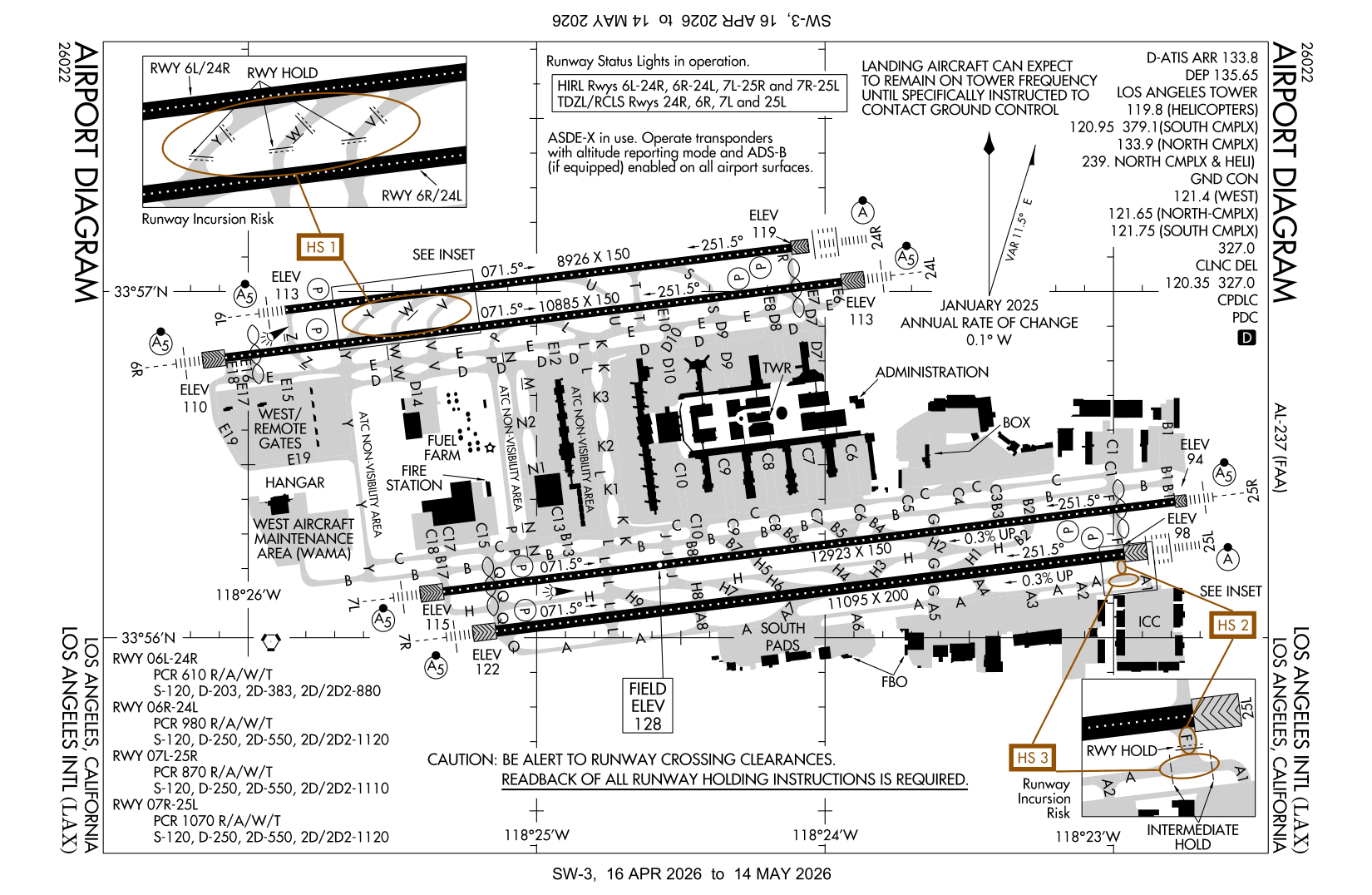
- FAA Airport Diagram

- Location within the Los Angeles metropolitan area Location within California Location within the United States
- Interactive map of Los Angeles International Airport

Runways
Direction	Length		Surface
Direction	m	ft	Surface
06L/24R	2,721	8,926	Concrete
06R/24L	3,318	10,885	Concrete
07L/25R	3,939	12,923	Concrete
07R/25L	3,382	11,095	Concrete

Statistics
- Passengers (2025): 73,709,594 ▼3.76%
- Aircraft operations (2025): 580,996
- Economic impact (2012): US$14.9 billion
- Social impact (2012): 133,900 employed
- Source: Federal Aviation Administration

Los Angeles International Airport (Note: Commonly referred to by its IATA code LAX with each letter pronounced individually.) (IATA: LAX, ICAO: KLAX, FAA LID: LAX) is the primary international airport serving Los Angeles and its surrounding metropolitan area, in the U.S. state of California. LAX is located in the Westchester neighborhood of the City of Los Angeles, 18 miles (29 km; 16 nmi) southwest of downtown Los Angeles, with the commercial and residential areas of Westchester to the north, the city of El Segundo to the south, and the city of Inglewood to the east. LAX is the closest airport to the Westside and the South Bay.

The airport is operated by Los Angeles World Airports (LAWA), a branch of the Los Angeles city government, that also operates the Van Nuys Airport for general aviation. The airport covers 3,500 acres (1,400 ha) of land and has four parallel runways.

In 2023, LAX handled 75,050,875 passengers, making it the world's eleventh-busiest airport, according to the Airports Council International rankings. In 2024, LAX served 76,587,980 passengers, a 2.04% increase from 2023. As the largest and busiest international airport on the West Coast of the United States, LAX is a major international gateway for the country, serving as a connection point for passengers traveling internationally (such as East and Southeast Asia, Australasia, Mexico, and Central America).

The airport holds the record for the world's busiest origin and destination airport, because relative to other airports, many more travelers begin or end their trips in Los Angeles than use it as a connection. In 2019, LAWA reported approximately 88% of travelers at LAX were origination and destination passengers, and 12% were connecting. It is also the only airport to rank among the top five U.S. airports for both passenger and cargo traffic. LAX serves as a hub, focus city, or operating base for more passenger airlines than any other airport in the United States.

Although LAX is the busiest airport in the Greater Los Angeles area, several other airports serve the region including Burbank, John Wayne (Orange County), Long Beach, Ontario, and San Bernardino.

== History ==
In 1926, the Los Angeles City Council and the Chamber of Commerce recognized the need for the city to have its own airport to tap into the fledgling, but quickly growing, aviation industry. Several locations were considered, but the final choice was a 640-acre (1 sq mi; 259 ha) field in the southern part of Westchester. The location had been promoted by real estate agent William W. Mines, and Mines Field as it was known had already been selected to host the 1928 National Air Races. On August 13, 1928 the city leased the land and the newly formed Department of Airports began converting the fields, once used to grow wheat, barley, and lima beans, into dirt landing strips.

The airport opened on October 1, 1928 and the first structure, Hangar No. 1, was erected in 1929. The building still stands at the airport, remaining in active use and listed on the National Register of Historic Places. Over the next year, the airport started to come together: the dirt runway was replaced with an all-weather surface and more hangars, a restaurant, and a control tower were built. On June 7, 1930, the facility was dedicated and renamed Los Angeles Municipal Airport.

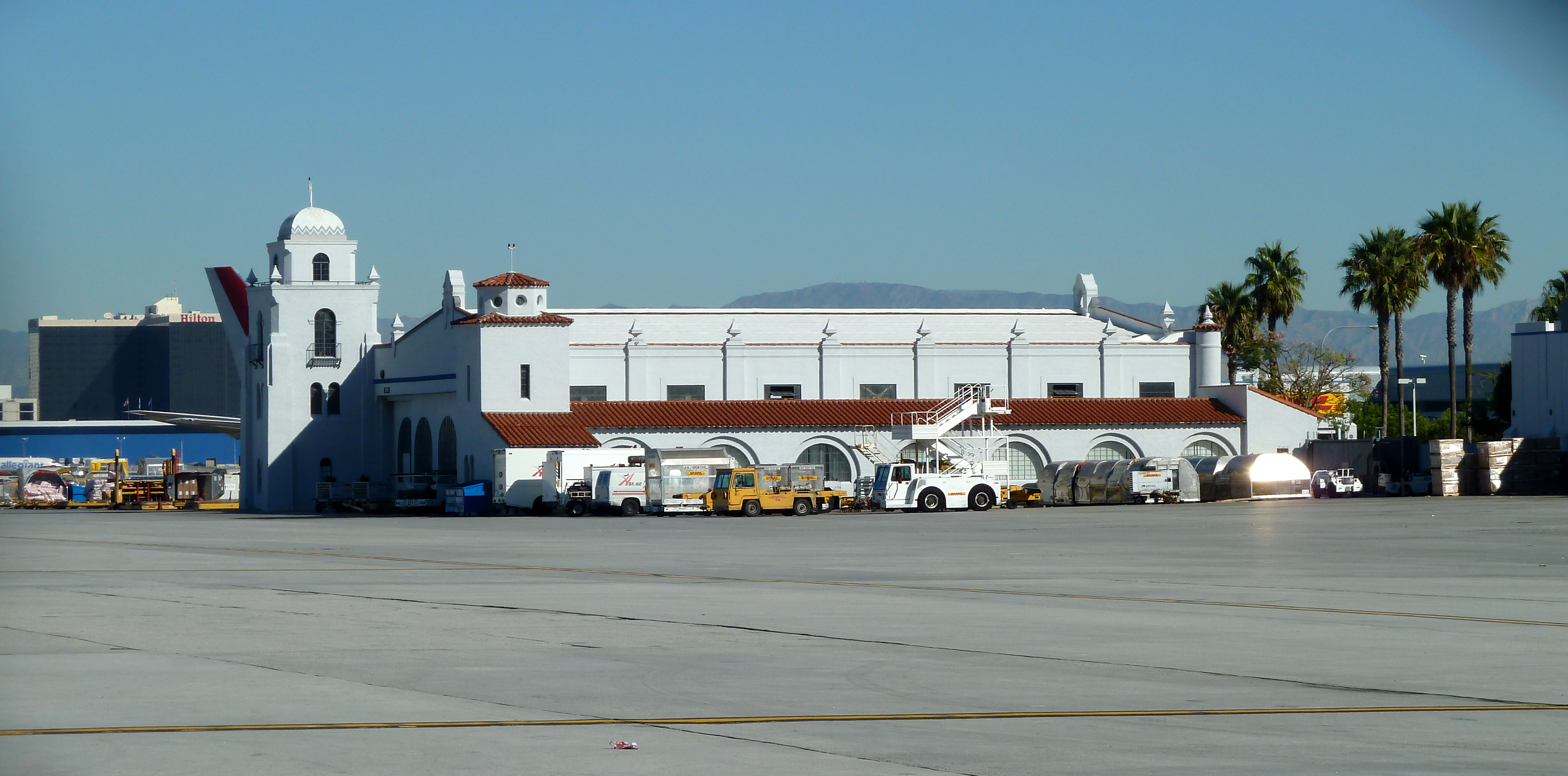
Hangar No. 1 was the first structure at LAX, built in 1929 and restored in 1990. It remains in use.

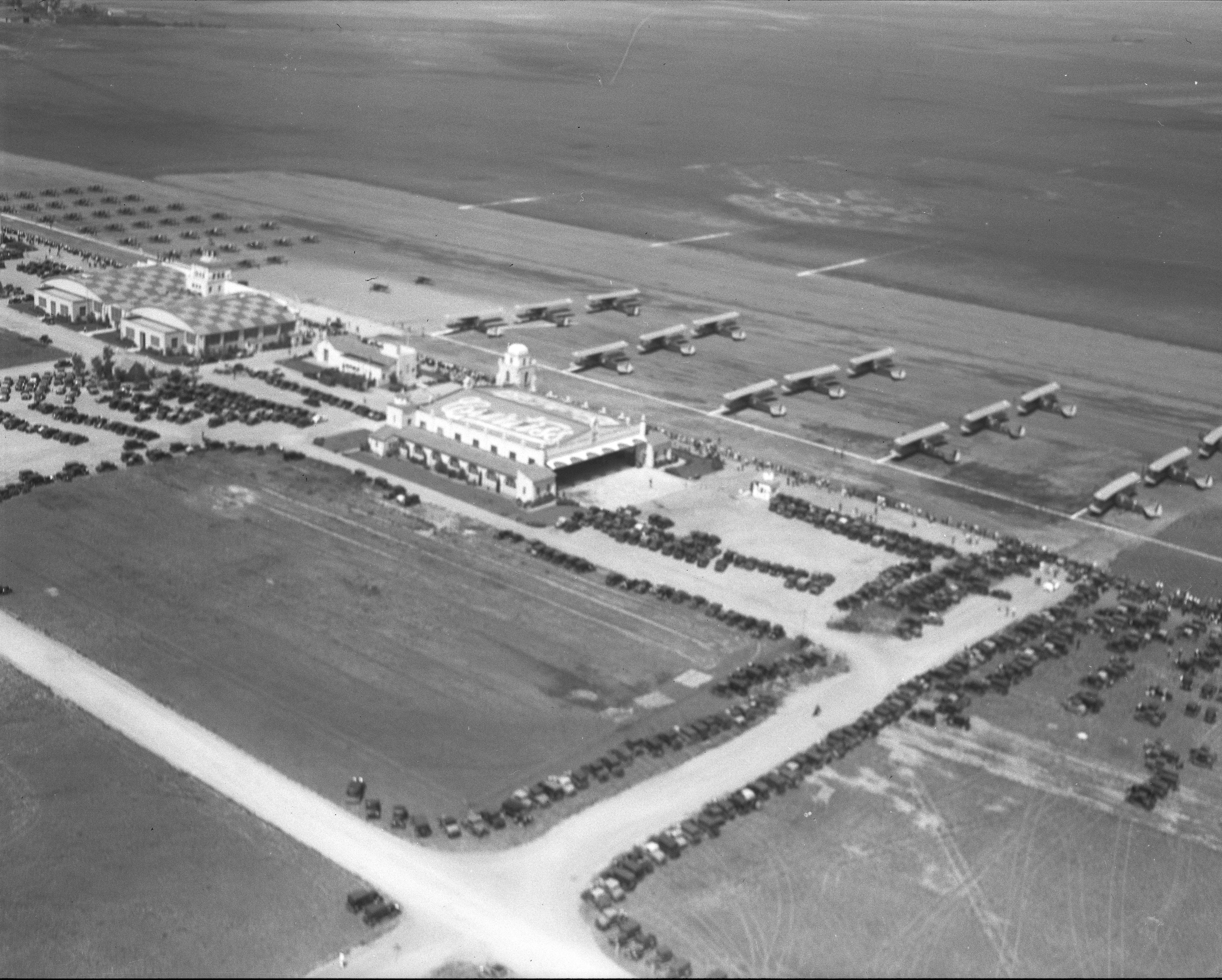
Los Angeles Municipal Airport on Army Day, c. 1931

The airport was used by private pilots and flying schools, but the city’s vision was that Los Angeles would become the main passenger hub for the area. However, the airport failed to entice any carriers away from the established Burbank Airport or the Grand Central Airport in Glendale.

World War II put a pause on any further development of the airport for passenger use. Before the United States entered the war, the aviation manufacturers located around the airport were busy providing aircraft for the Allied powers, while the flying schools found themselves in high demand. In January 1942, the military assumed control of the airport, stationing fighter planes there, and building naval gun batteries in the ocean dunes to the west.

Meanwhile, airport managers published a master plan for the land and, in early 1943, convinced voters to back a $12.5 million bond for airport improvements. With a plan and funding in place, the airlines were finally convinced to make the move.

After the end of the war, four temporary terminals were quickly erected on the north side of the airport and, on December 9, 1946, American Airlines, Trans World Airlines (TWA), United Airlines, Southwest Airways, and Western Airlines began passenger operations at the airport, with Pan American Airways (Pan Am) joining the next month. The airport was renamed Los Angeles International Airport in 1949.

The temporary terminals remained in place for 15 years but quickly became inadequate, especially as air travel entered the "jet age" and other cities invested in modern facilities. Airport leaders once again convinced voters to back a $59 million bond on June 5, 1956.

The current layout of the passenger facilities was established in 1958 with a plan to build a series of terminals and parking facilities, arranged in the shape of the letter U, in the central portion of the property. The original plan called for the terminal buildings to be connected at the center of the property by a huge steel-and-glass dome. The dome was never built, but a smaller Theme Building, constructed in the central area, became a focal point for people coming to the airport. The structure was dedicated on June 25, 1961, by Vice President Lyndon B. Johnson.

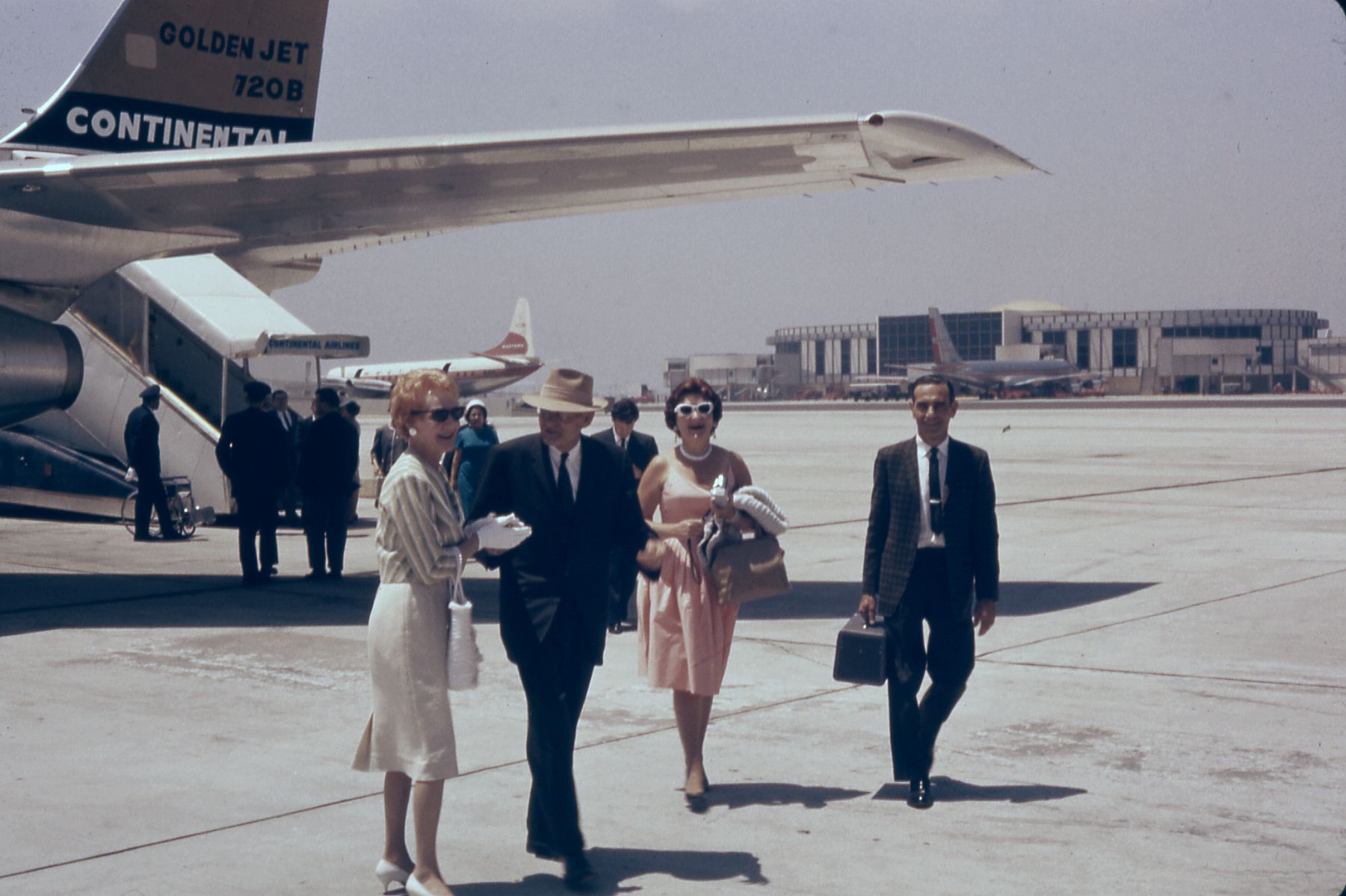
Continental passengers arriving at LAX, 1962

The first of the new passenger buildings, Terminals 7 and 8, were opened for United Airlines on June 25, 1961, following opening festivities that lasted several days. Terminals 2, 3, 4, 5, and 6 opened later that same year.

There was a major expansion of the airport in the early 1980s, ahead of the 1984 Summer Olympic Games. In November 1983, a second-level roadway was added, Terminal 1 opened in January 1984 and the Tom Bradley International Terminal opened in June 1984. The original terminals also received expansions and updates in the 1980s.

Since 2008, the airport has been undergoing another major expansion. All of the terminals are being refurbished, and the Tom Bradley International Terminal was substantially rebuilt, with a West Gates satellite concourse added. Outside of the terminal area, the LAX West Intermodal Transportation Facility with 4,300 parking spaces opened in 2021, replacing the former Lot C. A new LAX/Metro Transit Center and an LAX Rental Car Center (RCC) were built. All will be connected to the terminal area by SkyLink. Altogether, those projects are expected to cost $30 billion and bring LAX's total gates from 146 to 182. Ultra low-cost carriers say project costs have made operations at LAX unsustainable under their low-fare model, with fees hitting around $50 per departing passenger. As a result, Allegiant Air is shutting its LAX crew base and cutting several routes.

=== The "X" in LAX ===
Before the 1930s, US airports used a two-letter abbreviation and "LA" served as the designation for Los Angeles Airport. In 1947, with rapid growth in the aviation industry, the identifiers were expanded to three letters, and "LA" received an extra letter to become "LAX". The "X" does not have any specific meaning. "LAX" is also used for the Port of Los Angeles in San Pedro and by Amtrak for Union Station in Downtown Los Angeles.

== Infrastructure ==
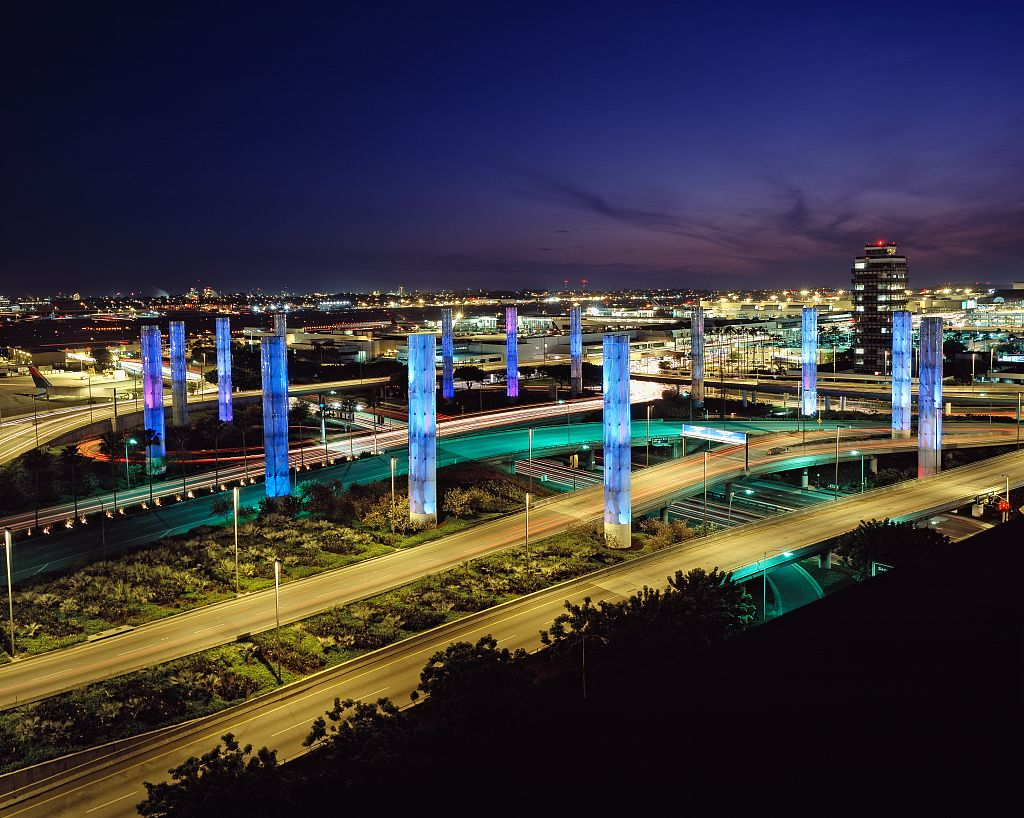
The light towers, first installed in preparation for the Democratic National Convention in 2000, feature a light installation by artist Paul Tzanetopoulos in which the towers change colors throughout the night.

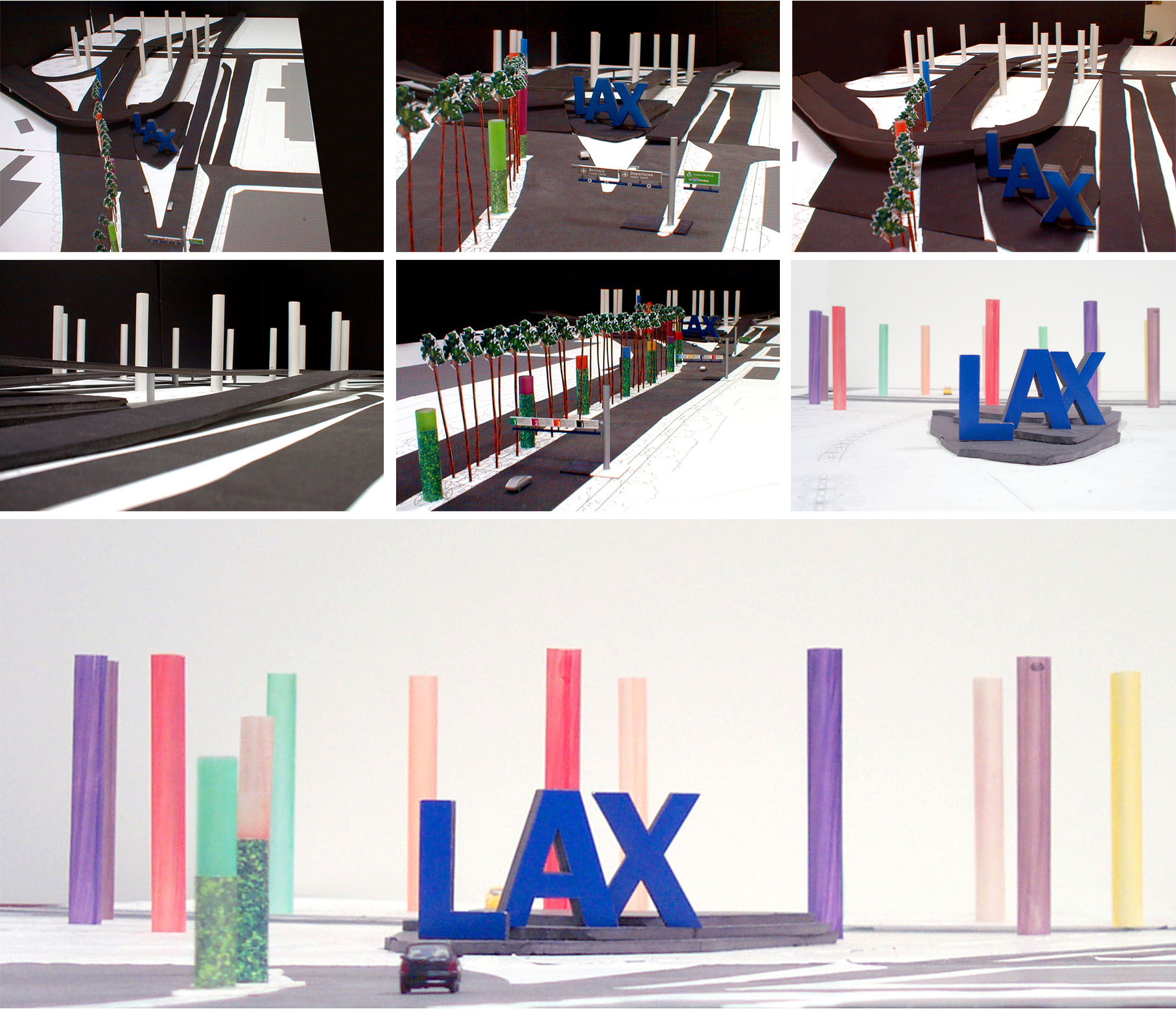
The light towers conceptual model as presented to LAX executives and created by Selbert Perkins Design

=== Airfield ===
Runways 24R/06L and 24L/06R (designated the North Airfield Complex) are north of the airport terminals, while runways 25R/07L and 25L/07R (designated the South Airfield Complex) are south of the airport terminals.

Runways at Los Angeles International
W	Length	Width	E
06L →	8,926 ft 2,721 m	150 ft 46 m	← 24R
06R →	10,885 ft 3,318 m	150 ft 46 m	← 24L
Terminal area
07L →	12,923 ft 3,939 m	150 ft 46 m	← 25R
07R →	11,095 ft 3,382 m	200 ft 61 m	← 25L

LAX is located with the Pacific Ocean to the west and residential communities on all other sides. Since 1972, Los Angeles World Airports has adopted a "Preferential Runway Use Policy" to minimize noise levels in the communities closest to LAX.

Typically, the loudest operations at an airport are from departing aircraft, with engines operating at high power, so during daytime hours (6:30am to midnight), LAX prefers to operate under the "Westerly Operations" air traffic pattern, named for the prevailing west winds. Under "Westerly Operations", departing aircraft take off to the west, over the ocean, and arriving aircraft approach from the east. To reduce noise to areas north and south of the airport, LAX prefers to use the "inboard" runways (06R/24L and 07L/25R) for departures, closest to the central terminal area and further from residential areas, and the "outboard" runways for arrivals. Historically, over 90% of flights have used the "inboard" departures and "outboard" arrivals scheme.

During night-time hours, when there are fewer aircraft operations and residential areas tend to be more noise sensitive, additional changes are made to reduce noise. Between 10pm and 7am, air traffic controllers try to use the "outboard" runways as little as possible and, between midnight and 6:30am, the air traffic pattern shifts to "Over-Ocean Operations", under which departing aircraft continue to take off to the west, but arriving aircraft also approach from the west, over the ocean.

There are times when the Over-Ocean and Westerly operations are not possible, particularly when the winds originate from the east, typically during inclement weather and when Santa Ana winds occur. In those cases, the airport shifts to the non-preferred "Easterly Operations" air traffic pattern, under which departing aircraft take off to the east, and arriving aircraft approach from the west.

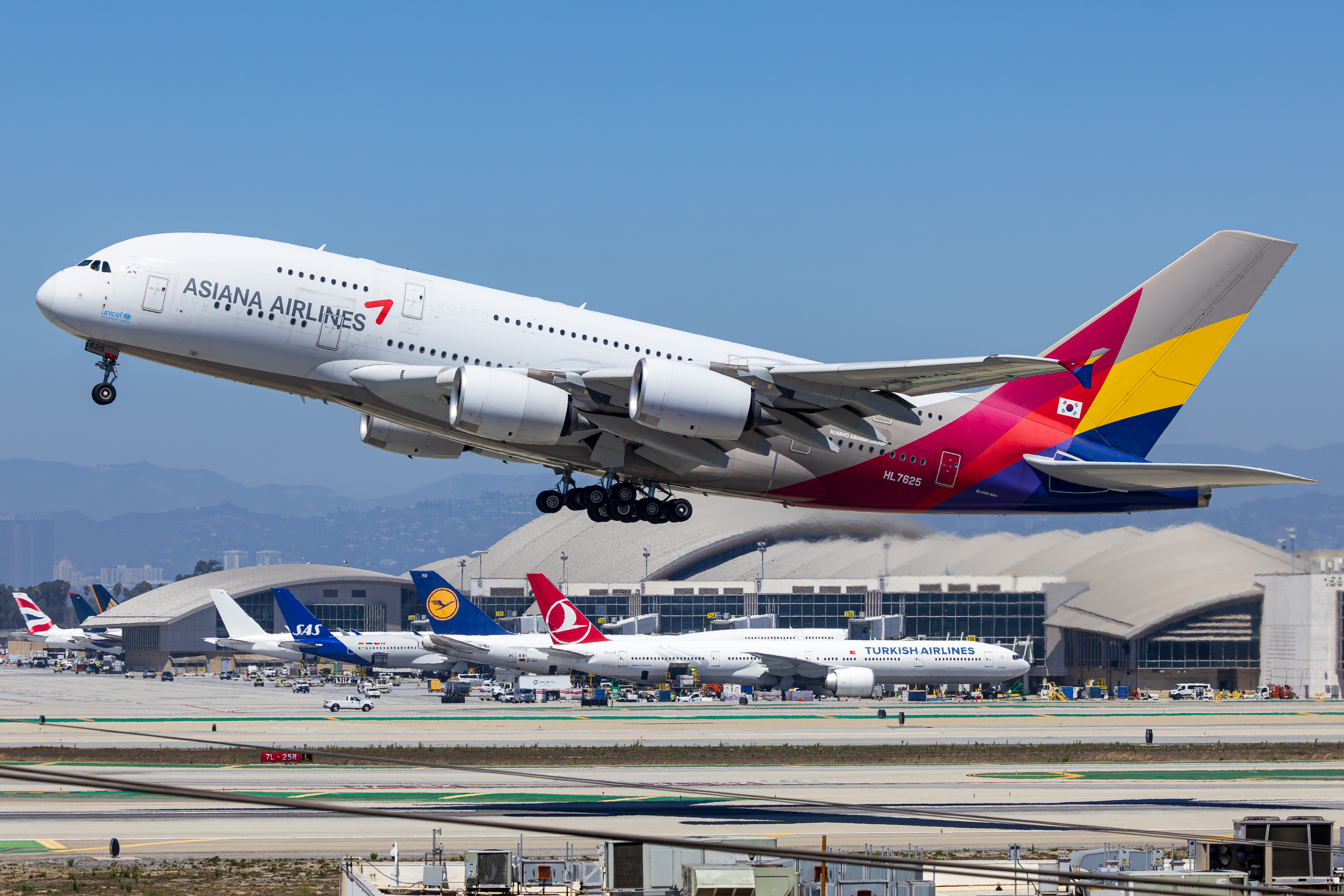
An Airbus A380 departing from runway 25R in the South Airfield Complex, with widebody aircraft at the gates of the Tom Bradley International Terminal behind

The South Airfield Complex tends to see more operations than the North, because there are a larger number of passenger gates and air cargo operations areas on the south side of the airport grounds. In 2007, the southernmost runway (07R/25L) was moved 55 feet (17 m) to the south to accommodate a new central taxiway. Runways in the North Airfield Complex are separated by 700 feet (210 m). There were plans to increase the separation by 260 feet (79 m), which would have allowed a central taxiway between runways to have been built, but faced opposition from residents living north of LAX. These plans were scrapped in 2016, in favor of lifting a gate cap at the airport and building a new park on the airport's north side.

=== Terminals ===
Map of LAX showing Terminals 1 through 8, plus the Tom Bradley International Terminal (B) and the Regional Terminal (R)

Los Angeles International Airport has 161 gates in nine passenger terminals arranged in the shape of the letter U or a horseshoe. On the landside of the airport, LAX Shuttle route A buses allow passengers to move between all terminals. On the airside, various pedestrian corridors allow passengers to move between all terminals on foot without having to exit and reenter airport security. Additionally, the airport will be served by SkyLink, which will connect terminals to one another on the landside, along with providing connections to the LAX Rental Car Center, parking facilities, and the LAX/Metro Transit Center, which is served by the Los Angeles Metro Rail system and public bus routes. In addition to these terminals, there are 2 million square feet (190,000 m^{2}) of cargo facilities.

Tom Bradley International Terminal 2026

=== Theme Building ===
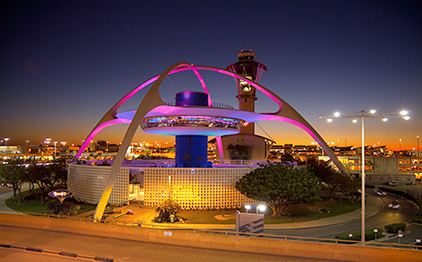
The Theme Building at LAX, built in 1961, is a Los Angeles Historic-Cultural Monument.

The distinctive Theme Building in the Googie style was built in 1961 and resembles a flying saucer that has landed on its four legs. A restaurant with a sweeping view of the airport is suspended beneath two arches that form the legs. The Los Angeles City Council designated the building a Los Angeles Historic-Cultural Monument in 1992. A $4 million renovation, with retro-futuristic interior and electric lighting designed by Walt Disney Imagineering, was completed before the Encounter Restaurant opened there in 1997. The restaurant is no longer in business. Visitors are able to take the elevator up to the observation deck of the "Theme Building", which had previously been closed after the September 11, 2001 attacks for security reasons. A memorial to the victims of the 9/11 attacks is located on the grounds, as three of the four hijacked planes were originally destined for LAX. The Bob Hope USO has operated on the ground floor since 2017.

=== Modernization projects ===
In 2017, LAWA adopted a plan to modernize LAX at a cost of $30 billion. The improvements are included in either the Airfield & Terminal Modernization Project (ATMP) or the Landside Access Modernization Program (LAMP). These include terminal and runway improvements, which will "enhance the passenger experience, reduce overcrowding, and provide airport access to the latest class of very large passenger aircraft"; this will bring the number of LAX's total gates from 146 to 182.

Completed improvements include:

- Renovations of Terminal 1 (completed 2018), Terminals 7 and 8 (completed 2019), and Terminals 2 and 3 (completed 2023)
- Terminal 1.5, a junction building connecting Terminals 1 and 2, with a bus gate to take passengers to boarding gates in the Tom Bradley International Terminal (completed 2021)
- The Midfield Satellite Concourse (West Gates at Tom Bradley International Terminal) adding 15 gates (completed 2021)
- Economy Parking facility, a 4,300-stall parking structure with passenger pick-up/drop-off areas, to later be connected to the terminal area by the APM (completed 2021)
- Replacement Los Angeles Airport Police headquarters (completed 2021)
- Terminal 4.5, a building connecting Terminals 4 and 5 to SkyLink and providing new landside space (completed 2022)
- LAX Rental Car Center, connected to the terminal area by SkyLink (completed 2024)
- LAX/Metro Transit Center, a Metro Rail and bus station, connected to the terminal area by the APM (completed 2025)
- Expansion of the Midfield Satellite Concourse adding 8 gates (completed 2025)
- Renovation of Terminal 6 (completed 2025)

Future improvements include:

- SkyLink (under construction, scheduled completion in February 2027)
- Renovation of Terminals 4 and 5 (under construction, scheduled completion 2028)
- Roadway improvements (ATMP) to improve flow between Sepulveda Boulevard and the Central Terminal Area (under construction, scheduled completion 2030)
- Construction of new Terminals 0 and 9 (ATMP, in planning)

== Airlines and destinations ==
=== Passenger ===
Airlines	Destinations	Refs
Aer Lingus	Dublin	
Aeroméxico	Guadalajara, Mexico City–Benito Juárez	
Air Canada	Montréal–Trudeau, Toronto–Pearson, Vancouver	
Air China	Beijing–Capital, Shenzhen	
Air France	Papeete, Paris–Charles de Gaulle	
Air New Zealand	Auckland	
Air Premia	Seoul–Incheon	
Air Tahiti Nui	Auckland, Papeete, Paris–Charles de Gaulle	
Alaska Airlines	Anchorage, Belize City, Boise, Eugene, Everett, Guadalajara, Guatemala City, Ixtapa/Zihuatanejo, Kailua-Kona, La Paz (MX), Liberia (CR), Loreto, Manzanillo, Mazatlán, Medford, Newark, Portland (OR), Puerto Vallarta, Redmond/Bend, San Francisco, San Jose (CA), San José (CR), San José del Cabo, Santa Rosa, Seattle/Tacoma, Spokane, Tri-Cities (WA), Washington–National; Seasonal: Honolulu	
All Nippon Airways	Tokyo–Haneda, Tokyo–Narita	
American Airlines	Atlanta, Austin, Boston, Charlotte, Chicago–O'Hare, Cleveland, Columbus–Glenn, Dallas/Fort Worth, Honolulu, Indianapolis, Kahului, Kailua-Kona, Las Vegas, Lihue, London–Heathrow, Mexico City–Benito Juárez, Miami, Nashville, New York–JFK, Orlando, Philadelphia, Phoenix–Sky Harbor, Pittsburgh, Raleigh/Durham, St. Louis, San Antonio, San Francisco, San José del Cabo, Sydney–Kingsford Smith, Tokyo–Haneda, Washington–Dulles, Washington–National; Seasonal: Auckland, Cancún, Puerto Vallarta, Vancouver	
American Eagle	Albuquerque, Denver, Des Moines, El Paso, Fayetteville/Bentonville, Houston–Intercontinental, Jackson Hole, Oklahoma City, Omaha, Portland (OR), Sacramento, San Antonio, San Francisco, Santa Fe, Seattle/Tacoma, St. Louis, Tucson, Tulsa; Seasonal: Aspen, Bozeman, Eagle/Vail, Missoula, Phoenix–Sky Harbor, Salt Lake City, Vancouver	
Asiana Airlines	Seoul–Incheon (ends December 17, 2026)	
Austrian Airlines	Seasonal: Vienna	
Avianca El Salvador	Guatemala City, San Salvador	
Breeze Airways	New Orleans; Seasonal: Charleston (SC), Greenville/Spartanburg, Jacksonville (FL), Louisville, Madison, Norfolk, Pittsburgh, Providence, Richmond	
British Airways	London–Heathrow	
Cathay Pacific	Hong Kong	
Cayman Airways	Grand Cayman	
China Airlines	Taipei–Taoyuan	
China Eastern Airlines	Shanghai–Pudong	
China Southern Airlines	Guangzhou	
Condor	Seasonal: Frankfurt	
Copa Airlines	Panama City–Tocumen	
Contour Airlines	Merced	
Delta Air Lines	Atlanta, Austin, Boston, Cancún, Chicago–O'Hare, Cincinnati, Dallas/Fort Worth, Denver, Detroit, Fort Lauderdale, Hong Kong, Honolulu, Houston–Intercontinental, Indianapolis, Kahului, Kailua-Kona, Kansas City, Las Vegas, Lihue, Manila (begins March 28, 2027), Melbourne, Memphis, Miami, Minneapolis/St. Paul, Nashville, New Orleans, New York–JFK, Newark (begins April 12, 2027), Orlando, Paris–Charles de Gaulle, Philadelphia (begins June 7, 2027), Portland (OR), Puerto Vallarta, Raleigh/Durham, Salt Lake City, San Antonio, San Francisco, San Jose (CA), San José del Cabo, Seattle/Tacoma, Shanghai–Pudong, Sydney–Kingsford Smith, Tampa, Tokyo–Haneda, Vancouver, Washington–National; Seasonal: Auckland, Brisbane, Liberia (CR), Mexico City–Benito Juárez, San José (CR), West Palm Beach	
Delta Connection	Albuquerque, Aspen, Boise, Monterey (begins December 19, 2026), Phoenix–Sky Harbor, Reno/Tahoe, Sacramento, San Diego, San Jose (CA), Spokane, Tucson; Seasonal: Bozeman, Eagle/Vail, Jackson Hole, Sun Valley	
EgyptAir	Cairo	
El Al	Tel Aviv	
Emirates	Dubai–International	
EVA Air	Taipei–Taoyuan	
Fiji Airways	Nadi	
Finnair	Helsinki	
Flair Airlines	Vancouver	
French Bee	Seasonal: Paris–Orly	
Frontier Airlines	Atlanta, Chicago–O'Hare, Dallas/Fort Worth, Denver, Detroit, Houston–Intercontinental, Las Vegas, Orlando, Phoenix–Sky Harbor, Portland (OR), Sacramento, Salt Lake City, San Francisco, San Jose (CA), Seattle/Tacoma	
Hawaiian Airlines	Honolulu, Kahului, Lihue	
Iberia	Madrid	
ITA Airways	Rome–Fiumicino	
Japan Airlines	Osaka–Kansai, Tokyo–Haneda, Tokyo–Narita	
JetBlue	Boston, Fort Lauderdale, New York–JFK; Seasonal: Buffalo, West Palm Beach	
JSX	Cabo San Lucas, Las Vegas	
KLM	Amsterdam	
Korean Air	Seoul–Incheon	
LATAM Brasil	São Paulo–Guarulhos	
LATAM Chile	Lima, Santiago de Chile	
LATAM Perú	Lima	
Level	Seasonal: Barcelona	
LOT Polish Airlines	Warsaw–Chopin	
Lufthansa	Frankfurt, Munich	
Parata Air	Seoul–Incheon (begins May 1, 2027)	
Philippine Airlines	Manila	
Porter Airlines	Toronto–Pearson	
Qantas	Brisbane, Melbourne, Sydney–Kingsford Smith	
Qatar Airways	Doha	
Royal Air Maroc	Casablanca	
Scandinavian Airlines	Copenhagen	
Sichuan Airlines	Chengdu–Tianfu	
Singapore Airlines	Singapore, Tokyo–Narita	
Southwest Airlines	Albuquerque, Austin, Baltimore, Boise (begins March 11, 2027), Chicago–Midway, Dallas–Love, Denver, El Paso, Honolulu, Houston–Hobby, Indianapolis, Kansas City, Las Vegas, Nashville, New Orleans, Oakland, Orlando, Phoenix–Sky Harbor, Reno/Tahoe, Sacramento, St. Louis, Salt Lake City, San Antonio, San Francisco, San Jose (CA), Tucson; Seasonal: Kahului, Kailua-Kona, Lihue, Tampa	
Starlux Airlines	Taipei–Taoyuan	
Sun Country Airlines	Minneapolis/St. Paul	
Swiss International Air Lines	Zurich	
TAP Air Portugal	Lisbon	
Turkish Airlines	Istanbul	
United Airlines	Austin, Baltimore, Bangkok–Suvarnabhumi, Beijing–Capital, Boston, Bozeman, Cancún, Chicago–O'Hare, Cleveland, Columbus–Glenn, Denver, Fort Lauderdale, Fresno, Guatemala City, Ho Chi Minh City, Hong Kong, Honolulu, Houston–Intercontinental, Kahului, Kailua-Kona, Las Vegas, Lihue, London–Heathrow, Melbourne, Newark, Orlando, Osaka–Kansai (resumes March 27, 2027), Phoenix–Sky Harbor, Pittsburgh, Puerto Vallarta, Reno/Tahoe, San Francisco, San José del Cabo, San Salvador, Seattle/Tacoma, Shanghai–Pudong, Sydney–Kingsford Smith, Tampa, Tokyo–Haneda, Tokyo–Narita, Vancouver, Washington–Dulles; Seasonal: Fort Myers, Jackson Hole, Liberia (CR), Portland (ME), San José (CR), Traverse City (begins June 19, 2027)	
United Express	Aspen, Austin, Bakersfield, Eureka, Fresno, Kansas City, Monterey, Palm Springs, Phoenix–Sky Harbor, Prescott, Redding, Redmond/Bend, Reno/Tahoe, Sacramento, St. George (UT), Salt Lake City, San Diego, San Luis Obispo, Santa Barbara; Seasonal: Bozeman, Eagle/Vail, Glacier Park/Kalispell, Hayden/Steamboat Springs, Jackson Hole, Montrose, Sun Valley	
Virgin Atlantic	London–Heathrow	
Viva	Guadalajara, Mexico City–Benito Juárez; Seasonal: Monterrey	
Volaris	Aguascalientes, Guadalajara, León/Del Bajío, Mexico City–Benito Juárez, Morelia, Oaxaca, Puebla, Querétaro, Tepic, Uruapan, Zacatecas	
Volaris Costa Rica	Guatemala City, San José (CR)	
Volaris El Salvador	San Salvador	
WestJet	Calgary, Edmonton, Vancouver	
XiamenAir	Xiamen	
Zipair Tokyo	Tokyo–Narita	

=== Cargo ===
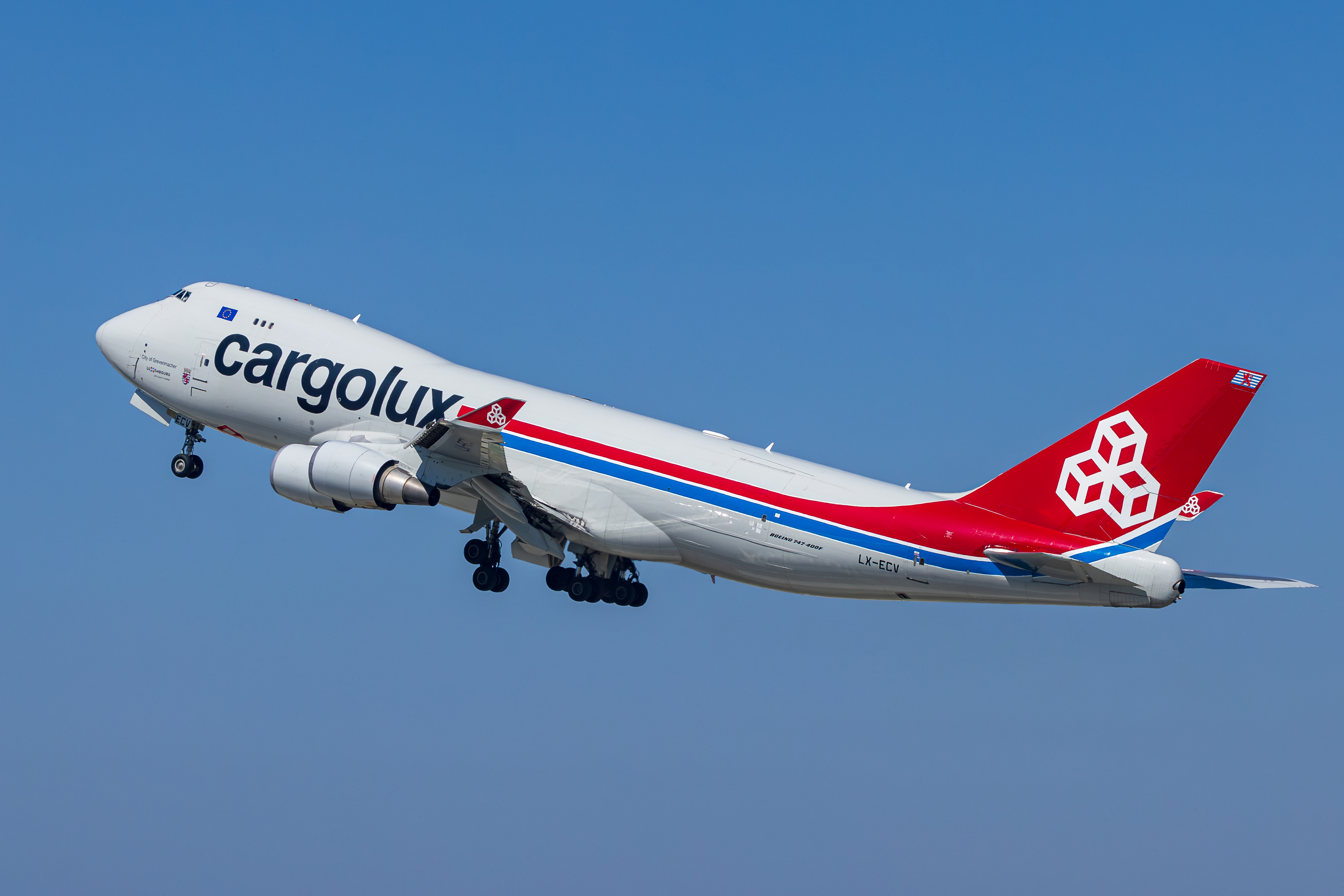
A Cargolux Boeing 747-400F departing LAX. Cargolux is one of the freight carriers serving the airport.

Airlines	Destinations	Refs
AeroLogic	Frankfurt	
Air China Cargo	Beijing–Capital, Shanghai–Pudong	
AirZeta	Anchorage, San Francisco, Seoul–Incheon	
Aloha Air Cargo	Honolulu, Seattle/Tacoma	
Amazon Air	Cincinnati	
ANA Cargo	Tokyo–Narita	
Atlas Air	Anchorage, Chicago–O'Hare, Cincinnati, Guadalajara, Hong Kong, Honolulu, Leipzig, Miami, New York–JFK, Seoul–Incheon, Shanghai–Pudong, Taipei–Taoyuan, Tokyo–Narita	
Avianca Cargo México	Guadalajara, León/Del Bajío, Mexico City–Felipe Ángeles, Monterrey	
Awesome Cargo	Zhengzhou	
Cargolux	Anchorage, Calgary, Glasgow–Prestwick, Guadalajara, Hong Kong, Luxembourg, Mexico City–Felipe Ángeles, Milan–Malpensa, Seattle/Tacoma, Singapore	
Cathay Cargo	Anchorage, Dallas/Fort Worth, Hong Kong, Mexico City–AIFA, Portland (OR)	
China Airlines Cargo	Anchorage, Osaka–Kansai, San Francisco, Taipei–Taoyuan	
China Cargo Airlines	Santiago de Chile, Shanghai–Pudong, Shenzhen	
China Southern Cargo	Anchorage, Guangzhou, Hefei, Shanghai–Pudong, Tianjin, Zhengzhou	
DHL Aviation	Anchorage, Calgary, Cincinnati, Guadalajara, East Midlands, Hong Kong, Honolulu, Huatulco, Leipzig/Halle, Mexico City–Felipe Ángeles, Phoenix–Sky Harbor, Portland (OR), San Francisco, San Jose (CA), San José (CR), Seattle/Tacoma, Seoul–Incheon, Singapore, Sydney–Kingsford Smith, Tokyo–Narita, Reno/Tahoe, Tucson, Vancouver	
Emirates SkyCargo	Copenhagen, Dubai–Al Maktoum, Frankfurt, Mexico City–Felipe Ángeles, Zaragoza	
EVA Air Cargo	Dallas/Fort Worth, San Francisco, Taipei–Taoyuan	
FedEx Express	Fort Worth/Alliance, Indianapolis, Memphis, Newark, Oakland	
Icelandair Cargo	Reykjavík–Keflavík	
Kalitta Air	Anchorage, Honolulu	
Korean Air Cargo	Anchorage, Chicago–O'Hare, Lima, San Francisco, Seoul–Incheon, Tokyo–Narita	
Lufthansa Cargo	Frankfurt	
Mas Air	Guadalajara, Miami, Mérida, Mexico City–Felipe Ángeles, Quito	
National Airlines	Anchorage	
Nippon Cargo Airlines	San Francisco, Tokyo–Narita	
Qantas Freight	Auckland, Chicago–O'Hare, Chongqing, Honolulu, Melbourne, Sydney–Kingsford Smith	
Qatar Airways Cargo	Amsterdam, Brussels, Chicago–O'Hare, Doha, Liège, Luxembourg, Mexico City–Felipe Ángeles, Ostend/Bruges	
SF Airlines	Anchorage, Ezhou, Hangzhou, Shenzhen	
Silk Way West Airlines	Baku	
Singapore Airlines Cargo	Amsterdam, Anchorage, Brussels, Chicago–O'Hare, Hong Kong, Singapore	
UPS Airlines	Dallas/Fort Worth, Louisville	
Western Global Airlines	Anchorage	
WestJet Cargo	Calgary, Vancouver	

== Statistics ==
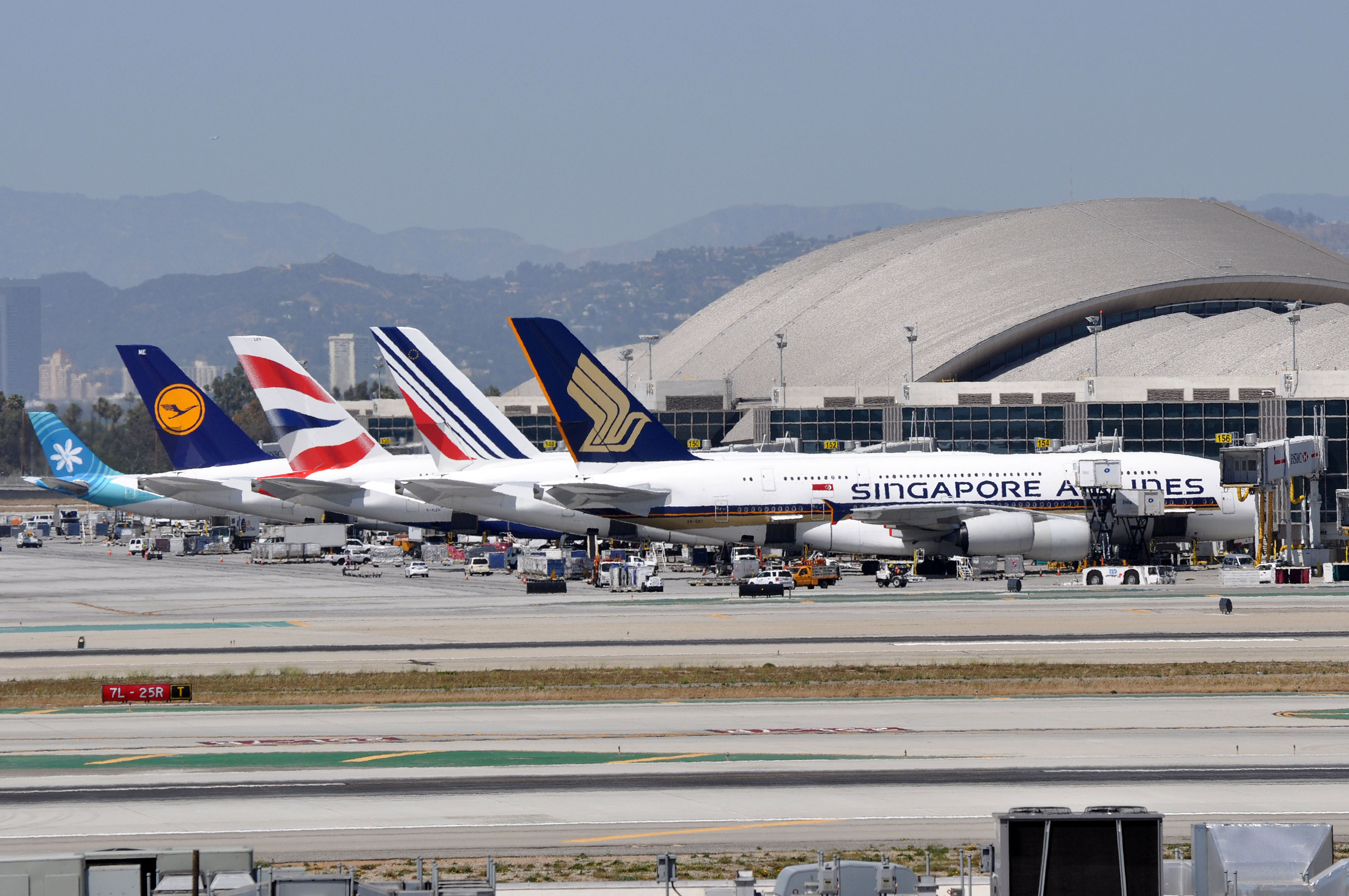
An Air Tahiti Nui Airbus A340-300 and four Airbus A380-800s from Lufthansa, British Airways, Air France and Singapore Airlines parked at Tom Bradley International Terminal in 2015.

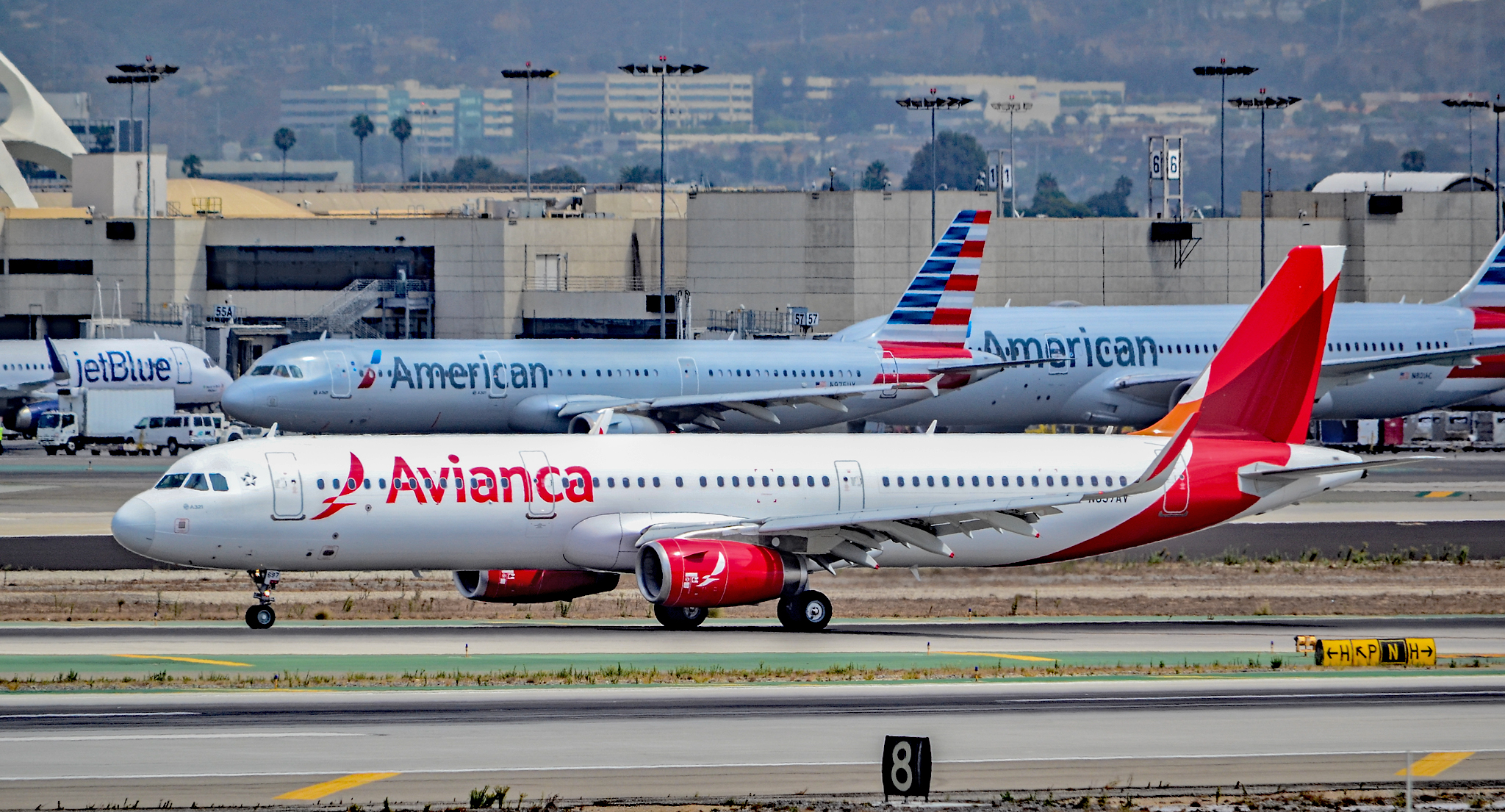
An Avianca Airbus A321 with two American Airlines and one JetBlue aircraft in the background in 2017

It is the world's eighth-busiest airport by passenger traffic and eleventh-busiest by cargo traffic, serving over 87 million passengers and 2 million tons of freight and mail in 2018. It is the busiest airport in the state of California, and the fifth-busiest (2022) airport by passenger boardings in the United States. In terms of international passengers, the second busiest airport for international traffic in the United States, behind only JFK in New York City. The number of aircraft movements (landings and takeoffs) was 700,362 in 2017, the third most of any airport in the world.

Traffic by calendar year
	Passenger volume	Aircraft movements	Freight (tons)	Mail (tons)
1994	51,050,275	689,888	1,516,567	186,878
1995	53,909,223	732,639	1,567,248	193,747
1996	57,974,559	763,866	1,696,663	194,091
1997	60,142,588	781,492	1,852,487	212,410
1998	61,215,712	773,569	1,787,400	264,473
1999	64,279,571	779,150	1,884,526	253,695
2000	67,303,182	783,433	2,002,614	246,538
2001	61,606,204	738,433	1,779,065	162,629
2002	56,223,843	645,424	1,869,932	92,422
2003	54,982,838	622,378	1,924,883	97,193
2004	60,704,568	655,097	2,022,911	92,402
2005	61,489,398	650,629	2,048,817	88,371
2006	61,041,066	656,842	2,022,687	80,395
2007	62,438,583	680,954	2,010,820	66,707
2008	59,815,646	622,506	1,723,038	73,505
2009	56,520,843	544,833	1,599,782	64,073
2010	59,069,409	575,835	1,852,791	74,034
2011	61,862,052	603,912	1,789,204	80,442
2012	63,688,121	605,480	1,867,155	88,438
2013	66,667,619	614,917	1,848,764	77,286
2014	70,662,212	636,706	1,921,302	79,850
2015	74,936,256	655,564	2,047,197	94,299
2016	80,921,527	697,138	2,105,941	99,394
2017	84,557,968	700,362	2,279,878	109,596
2018	87,534,384	707,833	2,338,642	109,694
2019	88,068,013	691,257	2,182,711	130,536
2020	28,779,527	379,364	2,329,348	135,498
2021	48,007,284	506,769	2,851,941	124,732
2022	65,924,298	556,913	2,632,536	122,034
2023	75,050,851	575,097	2,288,726	79,422
2024	76,443,490	581,779	2,404,426	52,176
2025	73,381,321	580,996	2,293,049	63,151
Source: Los Angeles World Airports

=== Top domestic destinations ===
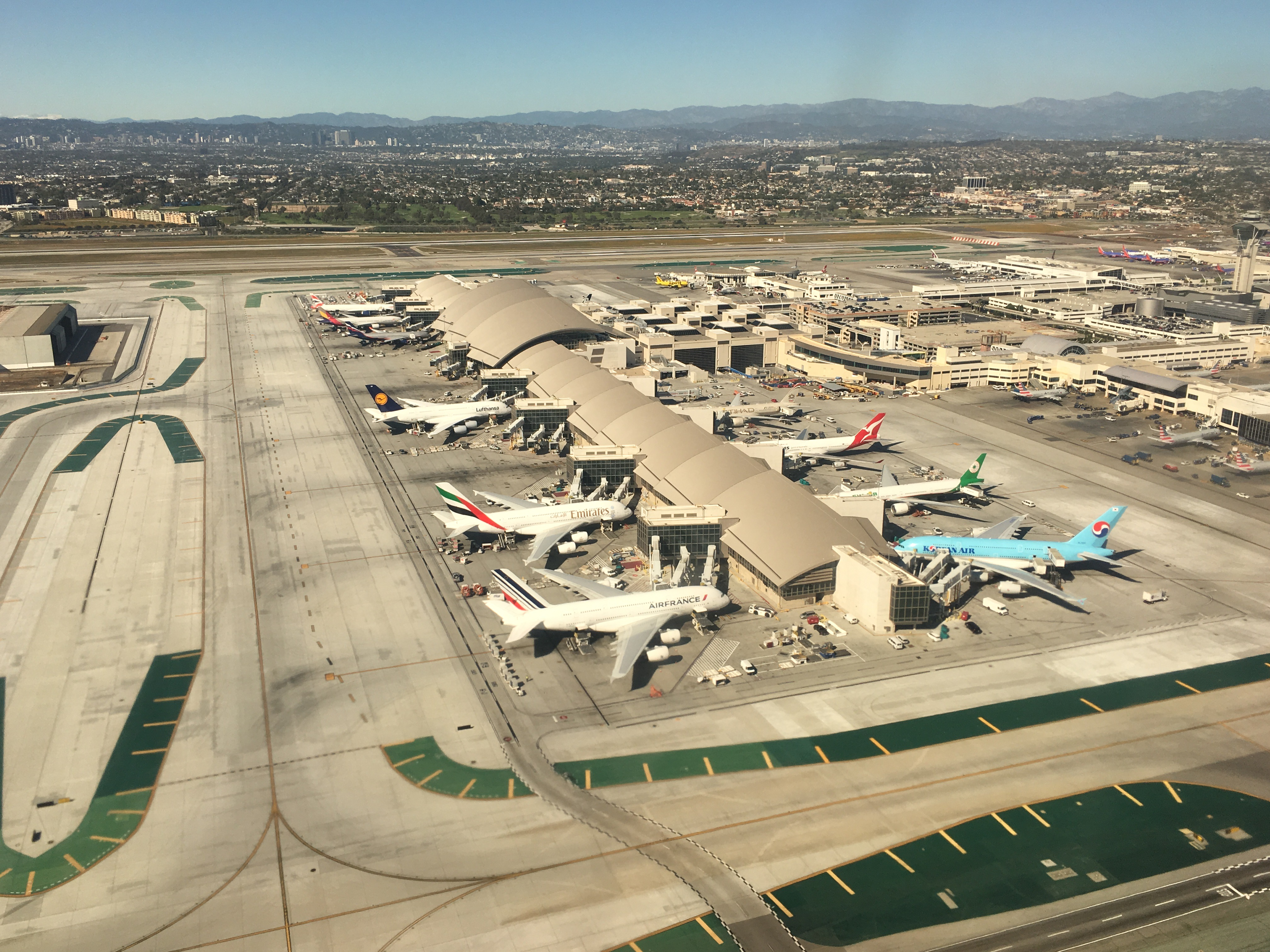
International carriers at Tom Bradley International Terminal, 2016

Busiest domestic routes from LAX (September 2025 – August 2026)
Rank	Airport	Passengers	Carriers
1	New York–JFK, New York	1,516,831	American, Delta, Frontier, JetBlue
2	San Francisco, California	1,441,412	Alaska, American, Delta, Frontier, Southwest, United
3	Chicago–O'Hare, Illinois	1,181,330	American, Frontier, Spirit, United
4	Honolulu, Hawaii	1,113,884	Alaska, American, Delta, Hawaiian, Southwest, United
5	Las Vegas, Nevada	1,068,383	American, Delta, Frontier, Southwest, Spirit, United
6	Denver, Colorado	1,006,387	American, Delta, Frontier, Southwest, United
7	Dallas/Fort Worth, Texas	927,867	American, Delta, Frontier, Spirit
8	Seattle/Tacoma, Washington	909,059	Alaska, American, Delta, Frontier, United
9	Newark, New Jersey	887,848	Alaska, JetBlue, Spirit, United
10	Atlanta, Georgia	879,702	American, Delta, Frontier, Spirit

=== Top international destinations ===
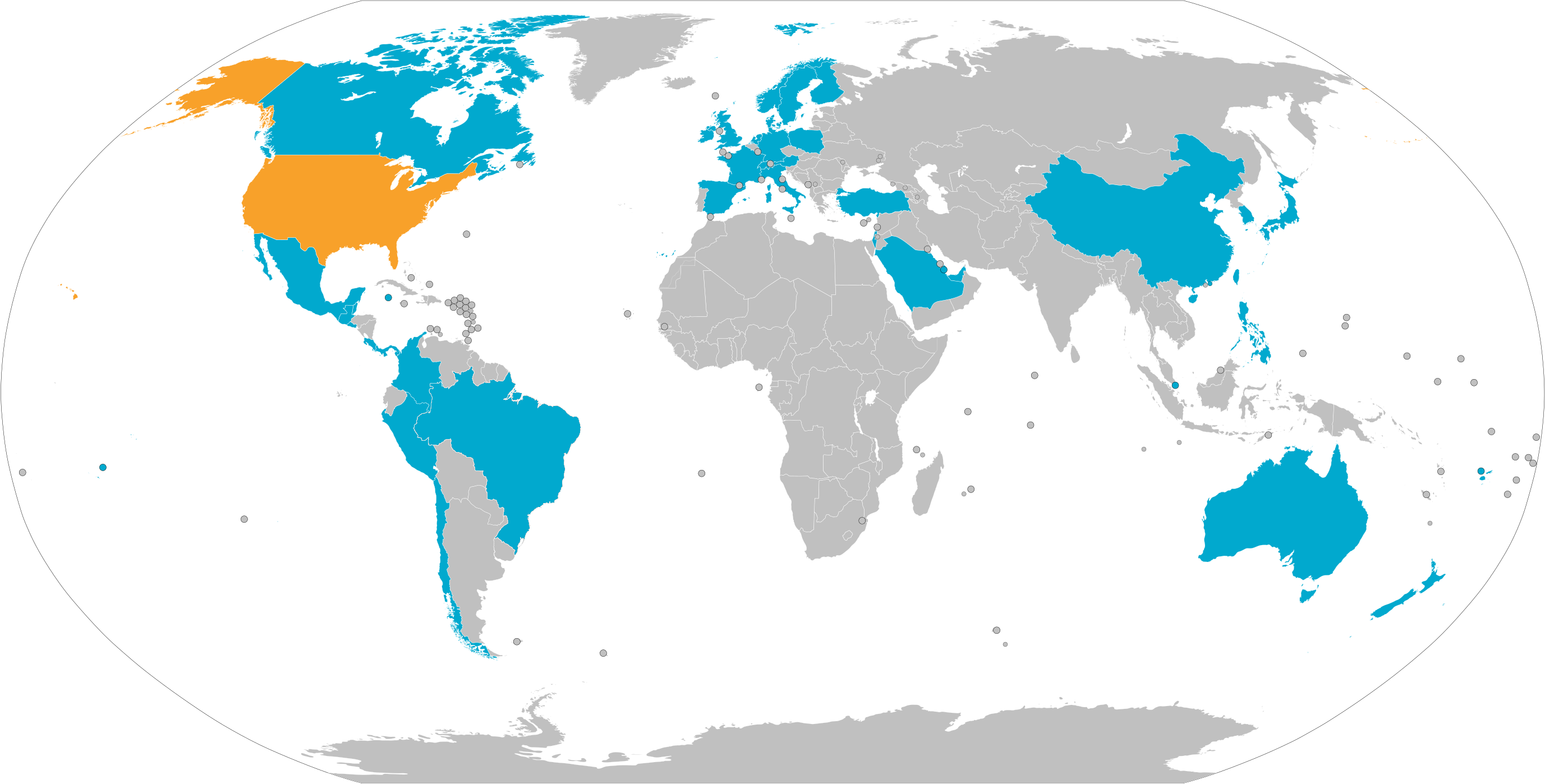
A world map showing all countries airlines which fly to and from the Los Angeles International Airport in blue

Busiest international routes from LAX (September 2025 – August 2026)
Rank	Airport	Passengers	Carriers
1	London–Heathrow, United Kingdom	1,410,056	American Airlines, British Airways, United Airlines, Virgin Atlantic
2	Tokyo–Haneda, Japan	1,159,257	All Nippon Airways, American Airlines, Delta Air Lines, Japan Airlines, United Airlines
3	Seoul–Incheon, South Korea	1,102,123	Air Premia, Asiana Airlines, Korean Air
4	Guadalajara, Mexico	1,042,291	Aeroméxico, Alaska Airlines, Viva, Volaris
5	Taipei–Taoyuan, Taiwan	935,147	China Airlines, EVA Air, Starlux Airlines
6	Hong Kong, Hong Kong	929,439	Cathay Pacific, United Airlines
7	Mexico City–Benito Juárez, Mexico	889,467	Aeroméxico, American Airlines, Delta Air Lines, Viva, Volaris
8	Paris–Charles de Gaulle, France	899,073	Air France, Air Tahiti Nui, Delta Air Lines, Norse Atlantic Airways
9	Tokyo–Narita, Japan	760,208	All Nippon Airways, Japan Airlines, Singapore Airlines, United Airlines, ZIPAIR Tokyo
10	Sydney, Australia	737,346	American Airlines, Delta Air Lines, Qantas, United Airlines

=== Airline market share ===
Largest airlines at LAX (September 2025 – August 2026)
Rank	Airline	Passengers	Share
1	Delta Air Lines (Note: Includes Delta Connection flights operated by SkyWest Airlines.)	13,683,691	19.1%
2	United Airlines (Note: Includes United Express flights operated by CommuteAir, Mesa Airlines and SkyWest Airlines.)	12,706,515	17.8%
3	American Airlines (Note: Includes American Eagle flights operated by Envoy Air and SkyWest Airlines.)	11,491,558	16.1%
4	Southwest Airlines	6,272,034	8.8%
5	Alaska Airlines (Note: Includes flights operated by Horizon Air and SkyWest Airlines.)	4,834,481	6.8%
–	Other Airlines	22,600,000	31.5%

== Ground transportation and access ==
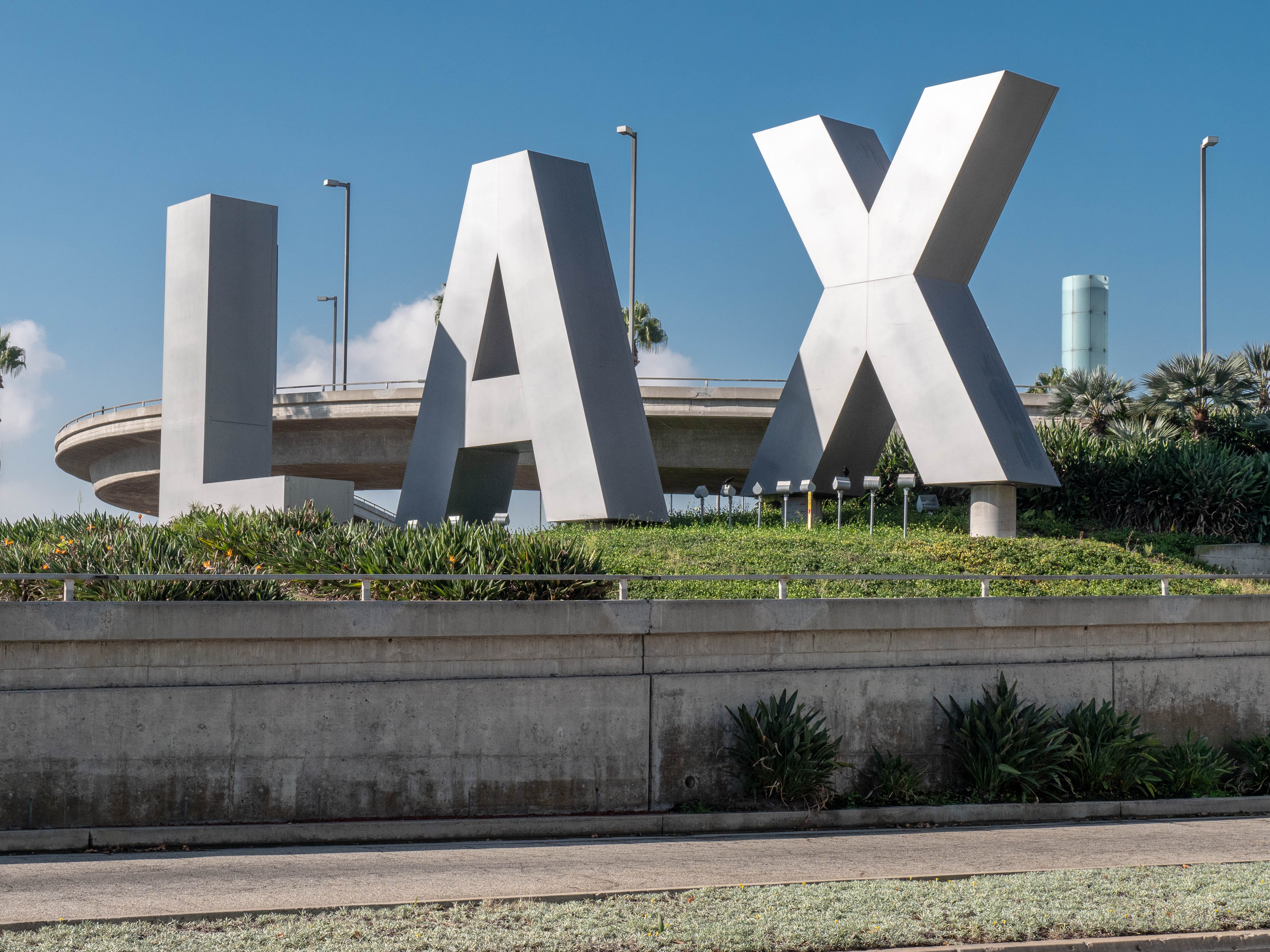
LAX sign as seen near the entrance of the airport

=== Transiting between terminals ===
In the secure area of the airport, tunnels or above-ground connectors link all the terminals except for the regional terminal.

LAX Shuttle route A operates in a counter-clockwise loop around the Central Terminal Area, providing frequent service for connecting passengers. However, connecting passengers who use these shuttles must leave and then later re-enter security.

=== LAX Shuttle routes ===
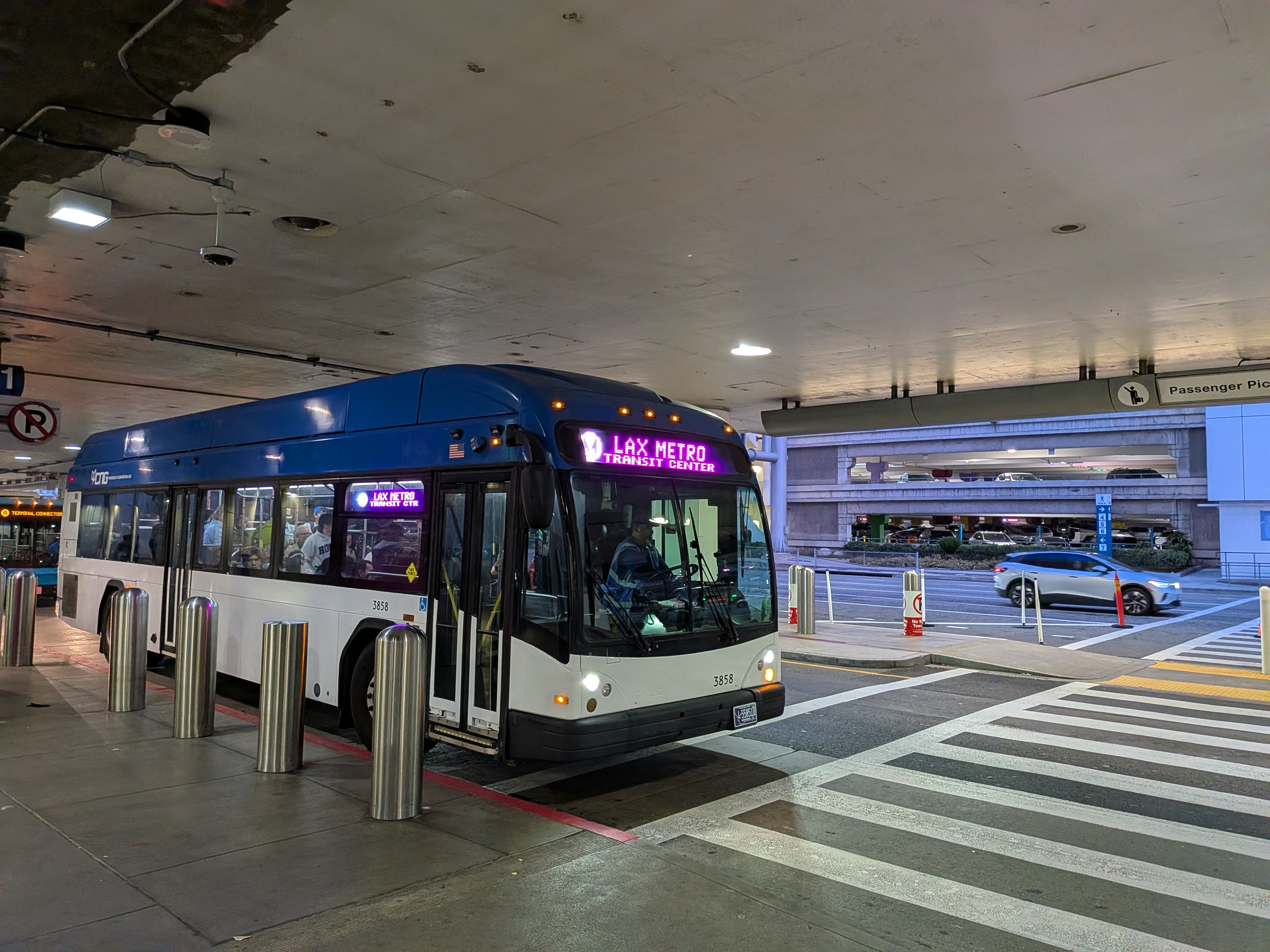
Shuttle Route M bus to LAX/Metro Transit Center at Terminal 1

LAX operates several shuttle routes to connect passengers and employees around the airport area:

Route A – Terminal Connector operates in a counter-clockwise loop around the Central Terminal Area, providing frequent service for connecting passengers. However, connecting passengers who use these shuttles must leave and then later re-enter security.

Route E – Economy Parking connects the Central Terminal Area and the West Intermodal Transportation Facility, the airport's economy parking garage.

Route M – Metro Connector connects the Central Terminal Area with the LAX/Metro Transit Center on the Metro C and K lines.

Route X – LAX Employee Lots connects the Central Terminal Area and the Employee Parking Lots. The route has three service patterns: the East Lot route only stops at Terminals 1, 2, 3, and B; the West Lot route only stops at Terminals 4, 5, 6, and 7; and the South Lot route stops at all terminals.

Several of these routes are expected to be discontinued following the opening of SkyLink, which will provide access to economy parking, the Metro station, and a relocated LAX employee parking lot on the LAX Rental Car Center rooftop.

=== FlyAway Bus ===
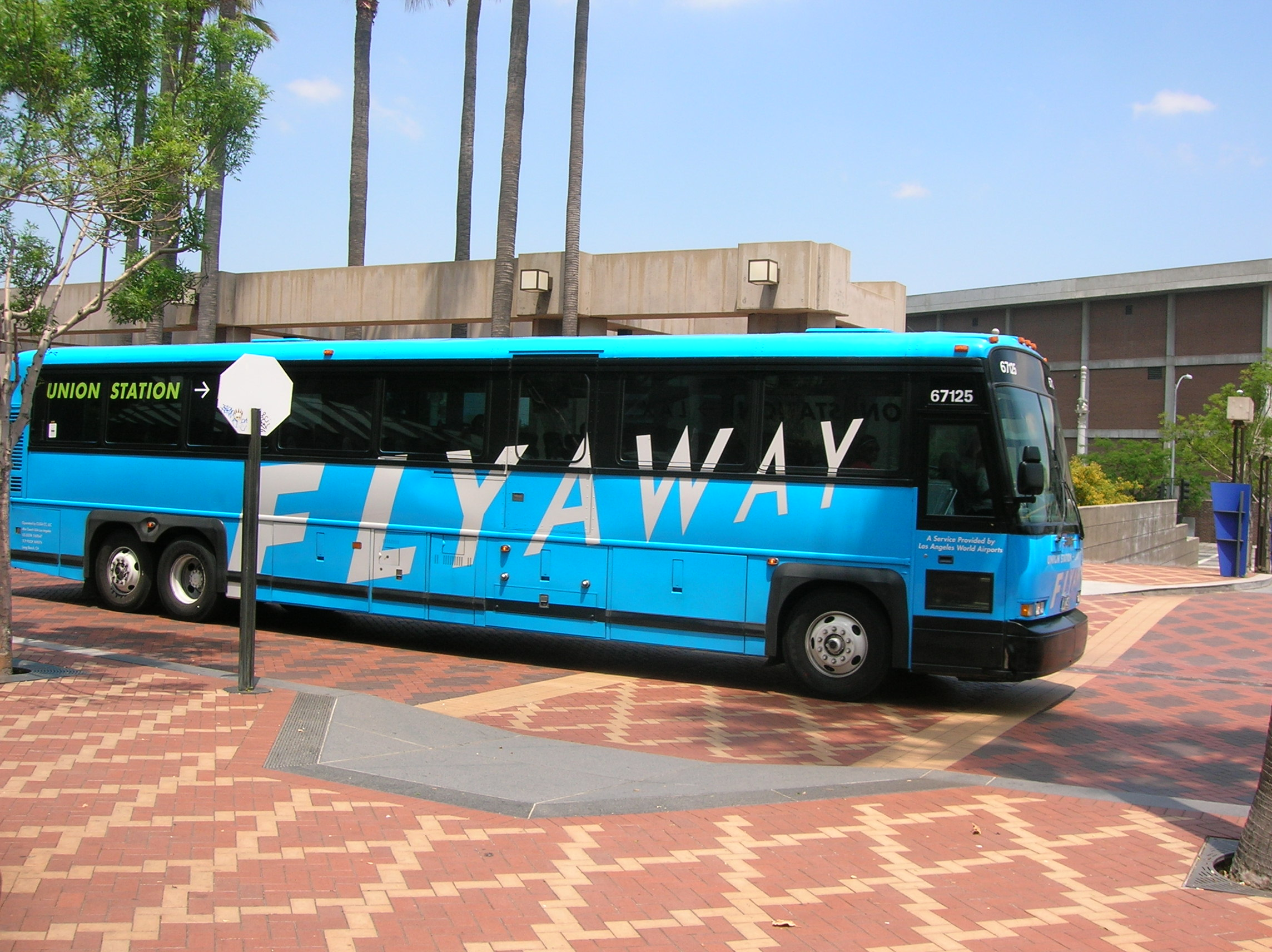
FlyAway bus at Los Angeles Union Station

The FlyAway bus is a nonstop motorcoach/shuttle service run by LAWA, which provides scheduled service between LAX and Union Station in Downtown LA or the FlyAway terminal at the Van Nuys Airport in the San Fernando Valley.

FlyAway buses stop at every LAX terminal in a counter-clockwise direction, starting at terminal 1. The service hours vary based on the line, with most leaving on or near the top of the hour. Buses use the regional system of high-occupancy vehicle lanes and high-occupancy toll lanes (Metro ExpressLanes) to expedite their trips.

=== Metro Rail and SkyLink ===
LAX does not currently have a direct connection to the Los Angeles Metro Rail system. LAX Shuttle route M offers free connections between the Central Terminal Area and the LAX/Metro Transit Center on the C and K, about 1 1/2 miles (2.4 km) away.

SkyLink, currently under construction by LAWA, is a 2 1/4-mile (3.6 km) rail line that will connect the terminal area with long- and short-term parking facilities, a connection to the Los Angeles Metro Rail and other transit at the LAX/Metro Transit Center, and a consolidated facility for all airport rental car agencies.

The APM project is estimated to cost $5.5 billion and is scheduled to begin operation in 2027.

=== Freeways and roads ===
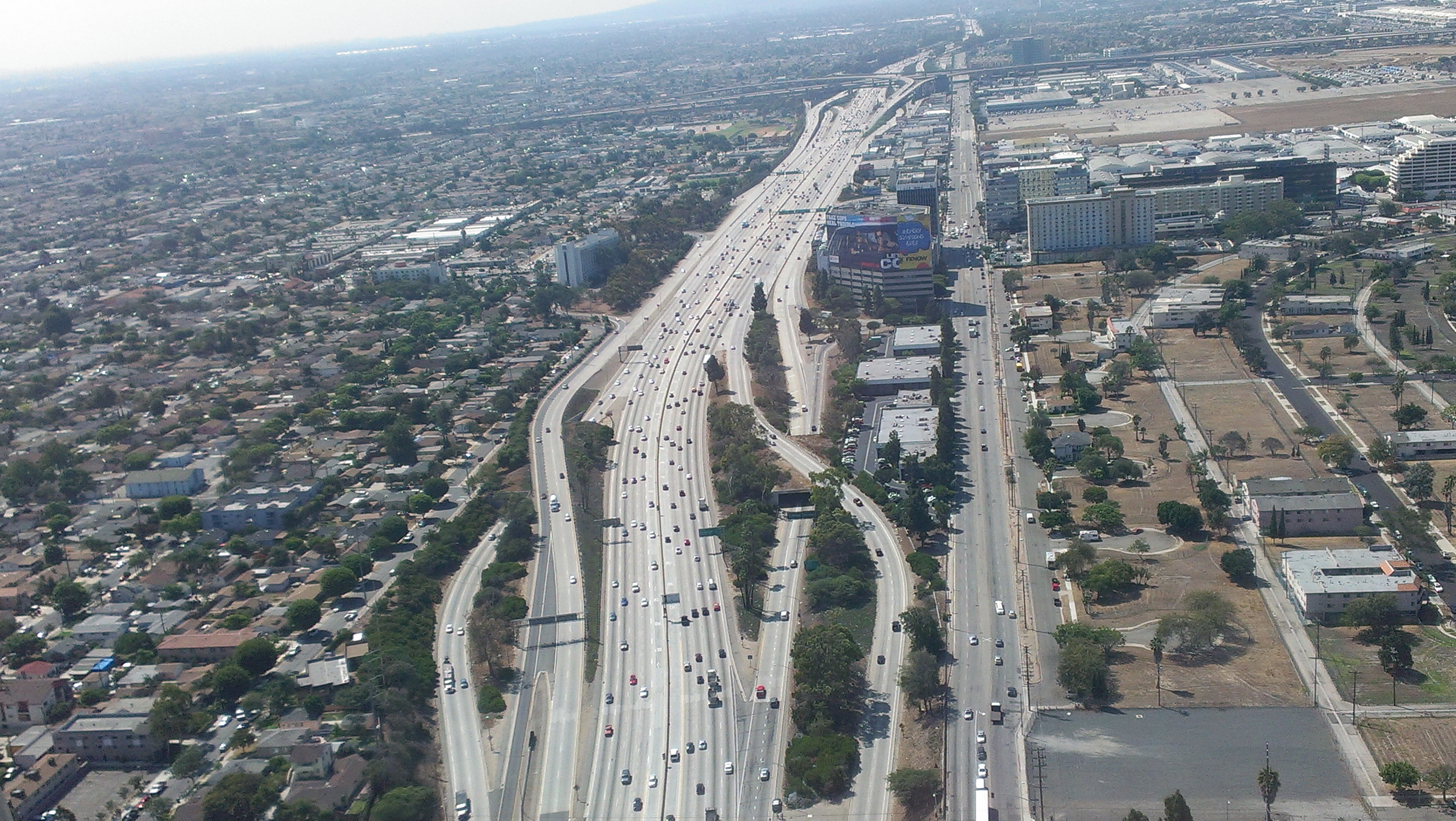
The 405 freeway near LAX

LAX's terminals are immediately west of the interchange between Century Boulevard and Sepulveda Boulevard (State Route 1). Interstate 405 can be reached to the east via Century Boulevard. Interstate 105 is to the south via Sepulveda Boulevard, through the Airport Tunnel that crosses under the airport runways.

=== Taxis, ride-share and private shuttles ===
Arriving passengers take a shuttle or walk to the LAXit waiting area east of Terminal 1 for taxi or ride-share pickups. Taxi services are operated by nine city-authorized taxi companies and regulated by Authorized Taxicab Supervision Inc. (ATS). ATS queues up taxis at the LAXit waiting area. LAX imposes a commercial access fee. A number of private shuttle companies also offer limousine and bus services to LAX.

== Other facilities ==
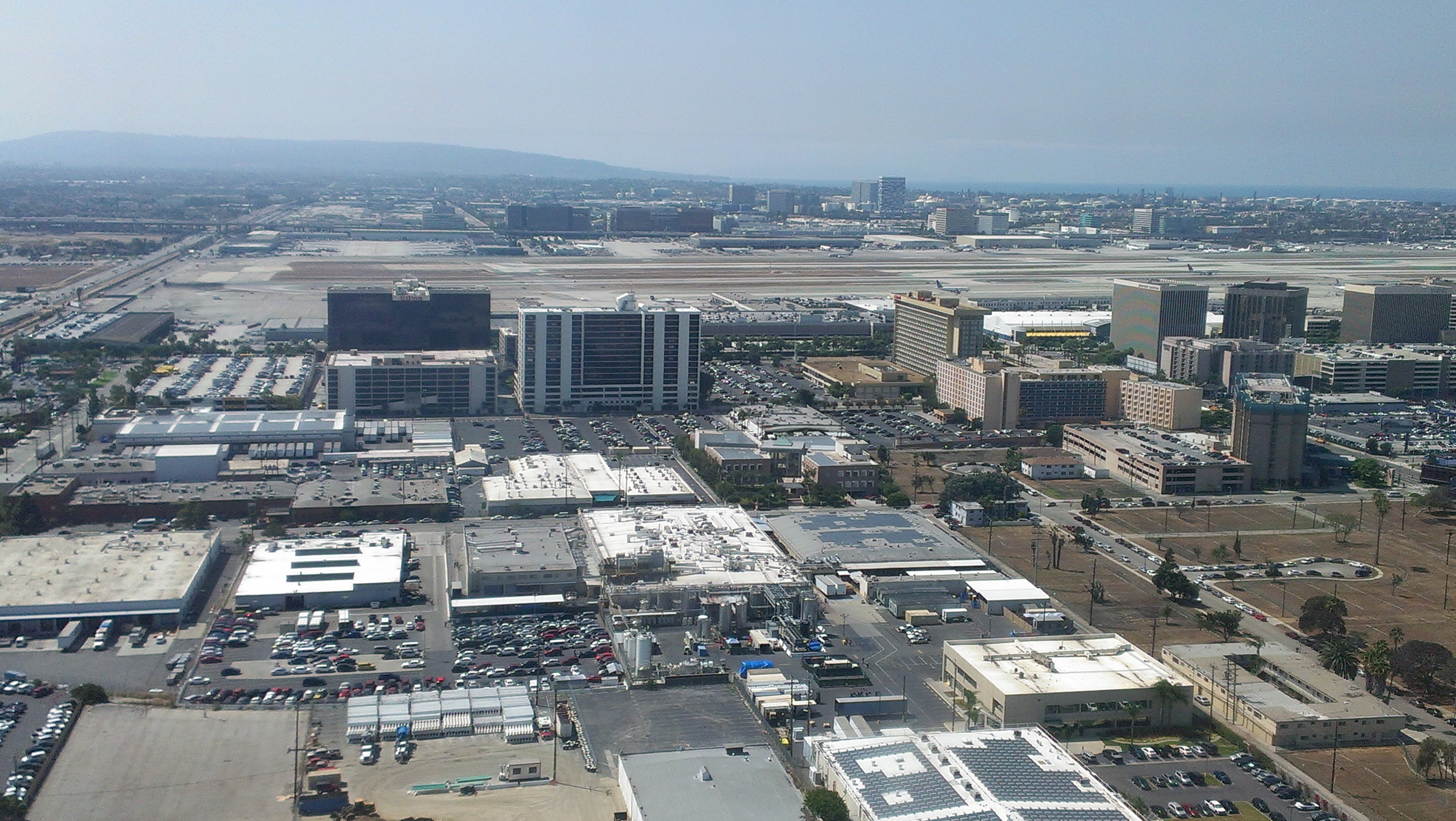
Hotels next to LAX

The airport has the administrative offices of Los Angeles World Airports.

Continental Airlines once had its corporate headquarters on the airport property. At a 1962 press conference in the office of Mayor of Los Angeles Sam Yorty, Continental Airlines announced that it planned to move its headquarters to Los Angeles in July 1963. In 1963 Continental Airlines headquarters moved to a two-story, $2.3 million building on the grounds of the airport. The July 2009 Continental Magazine issue stated that the move "underlined Continental Airlines western and Pacific orientation". On July 1, 1983 the airline's headquarters were relocated to the America Tower in the Neartown area of Houston.

In addition to Continental Airlines, Western Airlines and Flying Tiger Line also had their headquarters at LAX.

=== Flight Path Museum LAX ===
The Flight Path Museum LAX, formerly known as the Flight Path Learning Center, is a museum located at 6661 Imperial Highway and was formerly known as the "West Imperial Terminal". This building used to house some charter flights. It sat empty for 10 years until it was re-opened as a learning center for LAX.

The center contains information on the history of aviation, several pictures of the airport, as well as aircraft scale models, flight attendant uniforms, and general airline memorabilia such as playing cards, china, magazines, signs, and a TWA gate information sign.

The museum's library contains an extensive collection of rare items such as aircraft manufacturer company newsletters/magazines, technical manuals for both military and civilian aircraft, industry magazines dating back to World War II and before, historic photographs and other invaluable references on aircraft operation and manufacturing.

The museum has on display "The Spirit of Seventy-Six," a DC-3 that flew in commercial airline service, before serving as a corporate aircraft for Union 76 Oil Company for 32 years. The plane was built in the Douglas Aircraft Company plant in Santa Monica in January 1941, which was a major producer of both commercial and military aircraft.

== Accidents and incidents ==
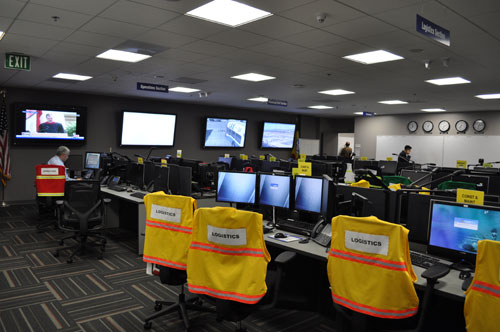
LAX Airport Response Coordination Center, used to coordinate emergency response

During its history there have been numerous incidents, but only the most notable are summarized below:

=== 1930s ===
- On January 23, 1939, the sole prototype Douglas 7B twin-engine attack bomber, designed and built as a company project, suffered a loss of the vertical fin and rudder during a demonstration flight over Mines Field, flat spun into the parking lot of North American Aviation, and burned. Another source states that the test pilot, in an attempt to impress the Gallic passenger, attempted a snap roll at low altitude with one engine feathered, resulting in a fatal spin. Douglas test pilot Johnny Cable bailed out at 300 feet, his chute unfurled but did not have time to deploy, he was killed on impact, the flight engineer John Parks rode in the airframe and died, but 33-year-old French Air Force Capt. Paul Chemidlin, riding in the aft fuselage near the top turret, survived with a broken leg, severe back injuries, and a slight concussion. The presence of Chemidlin, a representative of a foreign purchasing mission, caused a furor in Congress by isolationists over neutrality and export laws. The type was developed as the Douglas DB-7.

=== 1940s ===
- On June 1, 1940, the first Douglas R3D-1 for the U.S. Navy, BuNo 1901, crashed at Mines Field, before delivery. The Navy later acquired the privately owned DC-5 prototype, from William E. Boeing as a replacement.
- On November 20, 1940, the prototype NA-73X Mustang, NX19998, first flown October 26, 1940, by test pilot Vance Breese, crashed. According to P-51 designer Edgar Schmued, the NA-73 was lost because test pilot Paul Balfour refused, before a high-speed test run, to go through the takeoff and flight test procedure with Schmued while the aircraft was on the ground, claiming "one airplane was like another". After making two high speed passes over Mines Field, he forgot to put the fuel valve on "reserve" and during the third pass ran out of fuel. An emergency landing in a freshly plowed field caused the wheels to dig in, the aircraft flipped over, the airframe was not rebuilt, the second aircraft being used for subsequent testing.
- On October 26, 1944, WASP pilot Gertrude Tompkins Silver of the 601st Ferrying Squadron, fifth Ferrying Group, Love Field, Dallas, Texas, departed Los Angeles Airport, in a North American P-51D Mustang, 44-15669, at 1600 hrs PWT, headed for the East Coast. She took off into the wind, into an offshore fog bank, and was expected that night at Palm Springs. She never arrived. Owing to a paperwork foul-up, a search did not get under way for several days, and while the eventual search of land and sea was massive, it failed to find a trace of Silver or her plane. She is the only missing WASP pilot. She had married Sgt. Henry Silver one month before her disappearance.

=== 1960s ===
- On January 13, 1969, Scandinavian Airlines System Flight 933, a Douglas DC-8-62, crashed into Santa Monica Bay, approximately 6 nautical miles (11 km) west of LAX at 7:21 pm, local time. The aircraft was operating as flight SK933, nearing the completion of a flight from Seattle. Of nine crewmembers, three drowned, while 12 of the 36 passengers also drowned.
- On January 18, 1969, United Airlines Flight 266, a Boeing 727-100 bearing the registration number N7434U, crashed into Santa Monica Bay approximately 11.3 miles (18.2 km) west of LAX at 6:21 pm local time. The aircraft was destroyed, resulting in the death of all 32 passengers and six crew members aboard.

=== 1970s ===
- On the evening of June 6, 1971, Hughes Airwest Flight 706, a Douglas DC-9 jetliner that had departed LAX on a flight to Salt Lake City, Utah, was struck nine minutes after takeoff by a U.S. Marine Corps McDonnell Douglas F-4 Phantom II fighter jet over the San Gabriel Mountains. The midair collision killed all 44 passengers and five crew members aboard the DC-9 airliner and one of two crewmen aboard the military jet.
- On August 4, 1971, Continental Airlines Flight 712, a Boeing 707, collided in midair with a Cessna 150 over Compton. Although the Cessna was destroyed upon landing, there were no fatalities.
- On August 6, 1974, a bomb exploded near the Pan Am ticketing area at Terminal 2; three people were killed and 35 were injured.
- On March 1, 1978, two tires burst in succession on a McDonnell Douglas DC-10-10 on Continental Airlines Flight 603 during its takeoff roll at LAX and the plane, bound for Honolulu, veered off the runway. A third tire burst and the DC-10's left landing gear collapsed, causing a fuel tank to rupture. Following the aborted takeoff, spilled fuel ignited and enveloped the center portion of the aircraft in flames. During the ensuing emergency evacuation, a husband and wife died when they exited the passenger cabin onto the wing and dropped down directly into the flames. Two additional passengers died of their injuries approximately three months after the accident; 74 others aboard the plane were injured, as were 11 firemen battling the fire.
- On the evening of March 10, 1979, Swift Aire Flight 235, a twin-engine Aerospatiale Nord 262A-33 turboprop en route to Santa Maria, was forced to ditch in Santa Monica Bay after experiencing engine problems upon takeoff from LAX. The pilot, co-pilot, and a female passenger drowned when they were unable to exit the aircraft after the ditching. The female flight attendant and the three remaining passengers—two men and a pregnant woman—survived and were rescued by several pleasure boats and other watercraft in the vicinity.

=== 1980s ===
- In January 1985, a woman was found dead in a suitcase that was lying on the baggage carousel for a while. The suitcase had arrived on a Lufthansa flight. The woman was later discovered to have been an Iranian citizen who had recently married another Iranian with UGreen card status. She had been denied a US visa in West Germany and therefore decided to enter the US in this way.
- On August 31, 1986, Aeroméxico Flight 498, a DC-9 en route from Mexico City, Mexico, to Los Angeles, began its descent into LAX when a Piper Cherokee collided with the DC-9's left horizontal stabilizer over Cerritos, causing the DC-9 to crash into a residential neighborhood. All 67 people on the two aircraft were killed, in addition to 15 people on the ground. 5 homes were destroyed and an additional 7 were damaged by the crash and resulting fire. The Piper went down in a nearby schoolyard and caused no further injuries on the ground. As a result of this incident, the FAA required all commercial aircraft to be equipped with Traffic Collision Avoidance System (TCAS).

=== 1990s ===
- On February 1, 1991, USAir Flight 1493 (arriving from Columbus, Ohio), a Boeing 737-300, landing on runway 24L at LAX, collided on touchdown with SkyWest Airlines Flight 5569, a Fairchild Metroliner, preparing to depart to Palmdale. The collision was caused by a controller who told the SkyWest plane to wait on the runway for takeoff, then later gave the USAir plane clearance to land on the same runway, forgetting that the SkyWest plane was there. The collision killed all 12 occupants of the SkyWest plane and 23 of the 89 people aboard the USAir 737.

=== 2000s ===
- Al-Qaeda attempted to bomb LAX on New Year's Eve 1999/2000. The bomber, Algerian Ahmed Ressam, was captured in Port Angeles, Washington, the U.S. port of entry, with a cache of explosives that could have produced a blast 40 times greater than that of a car bomb hidden in the trunk of the rented car in which he had traveled from Canada. He had planned to leave one or two suitcases filled with explosives in an LAX passenger waiting area. He was initially sentenced to 22 years in prison, but in February 2010 an appellate court ordered that his sentence be extended.
- On January 31, 2000, Alaska Airlines Flight 261, attempted to land at LAX after experiencing problems with its tail-mounted horizontal stabilizer. Before the plane could divert to Los Angeles, it suddenly plummeted into the Pacific Ocean approximately 2.7 miles (4.3 km) north of Anacapa Island of the California coast, killing all 88 people aboard.
- During the September 11 attacks, American Airlines Flight 11, United Airlines Flight 175 and American Airlines Flight 77 were destined for LAX before they were hijacked mid-flight by Al-Qaeda terrorists. Flight 11 and Flight 175 deliberately crashed into the Twin Towers of World Trade Center and Flight 77 deliberately crashed into The Pentagon.
- In the 2002 Los Angeles International Airport shooting of July 4, 2002, Hesham Mohamed Hadayet killed two Israelis at the ticket counter of El Al Airlines at LAX. Although the gunman was not linked to any terrorist group, the man was upset at U.S. support for Israel, and therefore was motivated by political disagreement. This led the FBI to classify this shooting as a terrorist act, one of the first on U.S. soil since the September 11 attacks.
- On September 21, 2005, JetBlue Flight 292, an Airbus A320 discovered a problem with its landing gear as it took off from Bob Hope Airport in Burbank. It flew in circles for three hours to burn off fuel, then landed safely at Los Angeles International Airport on runway 25L, balancing on its back wheels as it rolled down the center of the runway. Passengers were able to watch their own coverage live from the satellite broadcast on JetBlue in-flight TV seat displays of their plane as it made an emergency landing with the front landing gear visibly becoming damaged. Because JetBlue did not serve LAX at the time, the aircraft was evaluated and repaired at a Continental Airlines hangar.
- On 19 December 2005, Air India flight 136, a Boeing 747-400M (registered as VT-AIM) flying from Los Angeles to Delhi via Frankfurt, suffered a tire blowout after take-off. The plane dumped fuel and returned to Los Angeles after conducting an emergency landing. There were no injuries among 267 passengers and crew, however a woman passenger was hospitalized after fainting on landing.
- On June 2, 2006, an American Airlines Boeing 767 was about to complete a flight from John F. Kennedy International Airport in New York City when the plane's pilots noted that the number 1 engine lagged the number 2 one by 2 percent. The plane landed safely and passengers disembarked, but when maintenance personnel retarded its throttle to idle, the number one engine, which had been put to maximum power, suffered an uncontained rupture of the high pressure turbine stage 1 disk, causing the engine to explode. There were no injuries among the three people on board the aircraft at the time (all of them maintenance workers), but the airplane was written off.
- On July 29, 2006, after America West Express Flight 6008, a Canadair Regional Jet operated by Mesa Airlines from Phoenix, Arizona, landed on runway 25L, controllers instructed the pilot to leave the runway on a taxiway known as "Mike" and stop short of runway 25R. Even though the pilot read back the instructions correctly, he accidentally taxied onto 25R and into the path of a departing SkyWest Airlines Embraer EMB-120 operating United Express Flight 6037 to Monterey. They cleared each other by 50 feet (15 m) and nobody was hurt.
- On August 16, 2007, a runway incursion occurred between WestJet Flight 900 and Northwest Airlines Flight 180 on runways 24R and 24L, respectively, with the aircraft coming within 37 feet (11 m) of each other. The planes were carrying a combined total of 296 people, none of whom were injured. The NTSB concluded that the incursion was the result of controller error. In September 2007, FAA Administrator Marion Blakey stressed the need for LAX to increase lateral separation between its pair of north runways in order to preserve the safety and efficiency of the airport.

=== 2010s ===
- On October 13 and 14, 2013, two incidents of dry ice bomb explosions occurred at the airport. The first dry ice bomb exploded at 7:00 p.m. in an employee restroom in Terminal 2, with no injuries. Terminal 2 was briefly shut down as a result. On the next day at 8:30 p.m., a dry ice bomb exploded on the ramp area near the Tom Bradley International Terminal, also without injuries. Two other plastic bottles containing dry ice were found at the scene during the second explosion. On October 15, a 28-year-old airport employee was arrested in connection with the explosions and was booked on charges of possession of an explosive or destructive device near an aircraft. On October 18, a 41-year-old airport employee was arrested in connection with the second explosion, and was booked on suspicion of possessing a destructive device near an aircraft. Authorities believe that the incidents were not linked to terrorism. Both men subsequently pleaded no contest and were each sentenced to three years' probation. The airport workers had removed dry ice from a cargo hold into which a dog was to be loaded, because of fears that the dry ice could harm the animal.
- In the 2013 Los Angeles International Airport shooting of November 1, 2013, at around 9:31 a.m. PDT, a lone gunman entered Terminal 3 and opened fire with a semi-automatic rifle, killing a Transportation Security Administration (TSA) officer and wounding three other people. The gunman was later apprehended and taken into custody. Until the situation was clarified and under control, a few terminals at the airport were evacuated, all inbound flights were diverted and all outbound flights were grounded until the airport began returning to normal operation at around 2:30 p.m.
- On August 28, 2016, there was a false report of shots fired throughout the airport, causing a temporary lock down and about 3 hours of flight delays.
- On May 20, 2017, Aeroméxico Flight 642, a Boeing 737-800, collided with a utility truck on a taxiway near Runway 25R, injuring 8 people, two of them seriously.
- On July 25, 2018, jetblast from a Dash 8 caused some dollies to crash into a United 737.
- On November 21, 2019, Philippine Airlines Flight 113, operated by a Boeing 777-300ER suffered an engine compressor stall shortly after take off from the airport's Runway 25R, forcing the flight to return. The flight made a successful emergency landing just 13 minutes after departure. There were 342 passengers and 18 crew on board the flight, with no injuries reported.

=== 2020s ===
- On August 19, 2020, FedEx Express Flight 1026, a Boeing 767, made an emergency landing when its left main landing gear failed to extend. One of the pilots was injured while leaving the aircraft.
- On July 8, 2024, a Boeing 757-200 of United Airlines, registration N14107, was in the initial climb out of runway 25R bound for Denver when one of the main wheels detached. The aircraft continued to Denver and landed safely with no casualties.
- On July 18, 2025, a Delta Air Lines Boeing 767-400ER under registration N836MH returned to LAX after suffering an engine fire that caused the flight to be delayed 6 hours.
- On March 2, 2026, a Boeing 787-9 of United Airlines, with registration N24972, made an emergency landing after its left engine burst into flames 13 minutes after departing from LAX. The plane landed back safely.

== Aircraft spotting ==
The "Imperial Hill" area of El Segundo is a prime location for aircraft spotting, especially for takeoffs. Part of the Imperial Hill area has been set aside as a city park, Clutter's Park.

Another popular spotting location sits under the final approach for runways 24 L&R on a lawn next to the Westchester In-N-Out Burger on Sepulveda Boulevard. This is one of the few remaining locations in Southern California from which spotters may watch such a wide variety of low-flying commercial airliners from directly underneath a flight path.

Another aircraft spotting location is at a small park in the take-off pattern that normally goes out over the Pacific. The park is on the east side of the street Vista Del Mar, from which it takes its name, Vista Del Mar Park.

=== Space Shuttle Endeavour ===
At 12:51 p.m. on Friday, September 21, 2012, a Shuttle Carrier Aircraft carrying the Space Shuttle Endeavour landed at LAX on runway 25L. An estimated 10,000 people saw the shuttle land. Interstate 105 was backed up for miles at a standstill. Imperial Highway was shut down for spectators. It was quickly taken off the Shuttle Carrier Aircraft, a modified Boeing 747, and was moved to a United Airlines hangar. The shuttle spent about a month in the hangar while it was prepared to be transported to the California Science Center.

== In popular culture ==
Numerous films and television shows have been set or filmed partially at LAX, at least partly due to the airport's proximity to Hollywood studios and Los Angeles. Film shoots at the Los Angeles airports, including LAX, produced $590 million for the Los Angeles region from 2002 to 2005.

== See also ==
- Busiest airports in the United States by international passenger traffic
- Busiest airports in the United States by total passenger boardings
- List of airports in California
- List of airports in the Los Angeles area
- List of airports with triple takeoff/landing capability
- California World War II Army airfields
- Peirson Mitchell Hall
- Transportation in Los Angeles
