= Mary Bethune Park =

Public park in South Los Angeles, California, United States

Coordinates: 33.984°N 118.253°W

Mary M. Bethune Park is a public park located in South Los Angeles, California. The park is located at 1244 East 61st Street, near the intersection of Central and Gage Avenues. It is managed by the County of Los Angeles Department of Parks and Recreation. The Newton Division of the Los Angeles Police Department is responsible for law enforcement in Bethune Park.

Bethune Park is named in honor of Mary Jane McLeod Bethune, who was an African-American political activist, education reformer, and advisor to President Franklin D. Roosevelt.

== Artwork ==
Different Strokes is a tile mural by artist Paul Tzanetopoulos on the back wall surrounding the pool at the park: 90 ft × 5 ft (27.4 m × 1.5 m) with graphic images of swimmers, celebrating diversity, showing people in harmony, intended to highlight the pool as a gathering place where people come together ro play and work unite to play and work together. The artwork is made of 1 in (2.5 cm) porcelain and molded glass tiles.
