= West Hollywood Gateway =

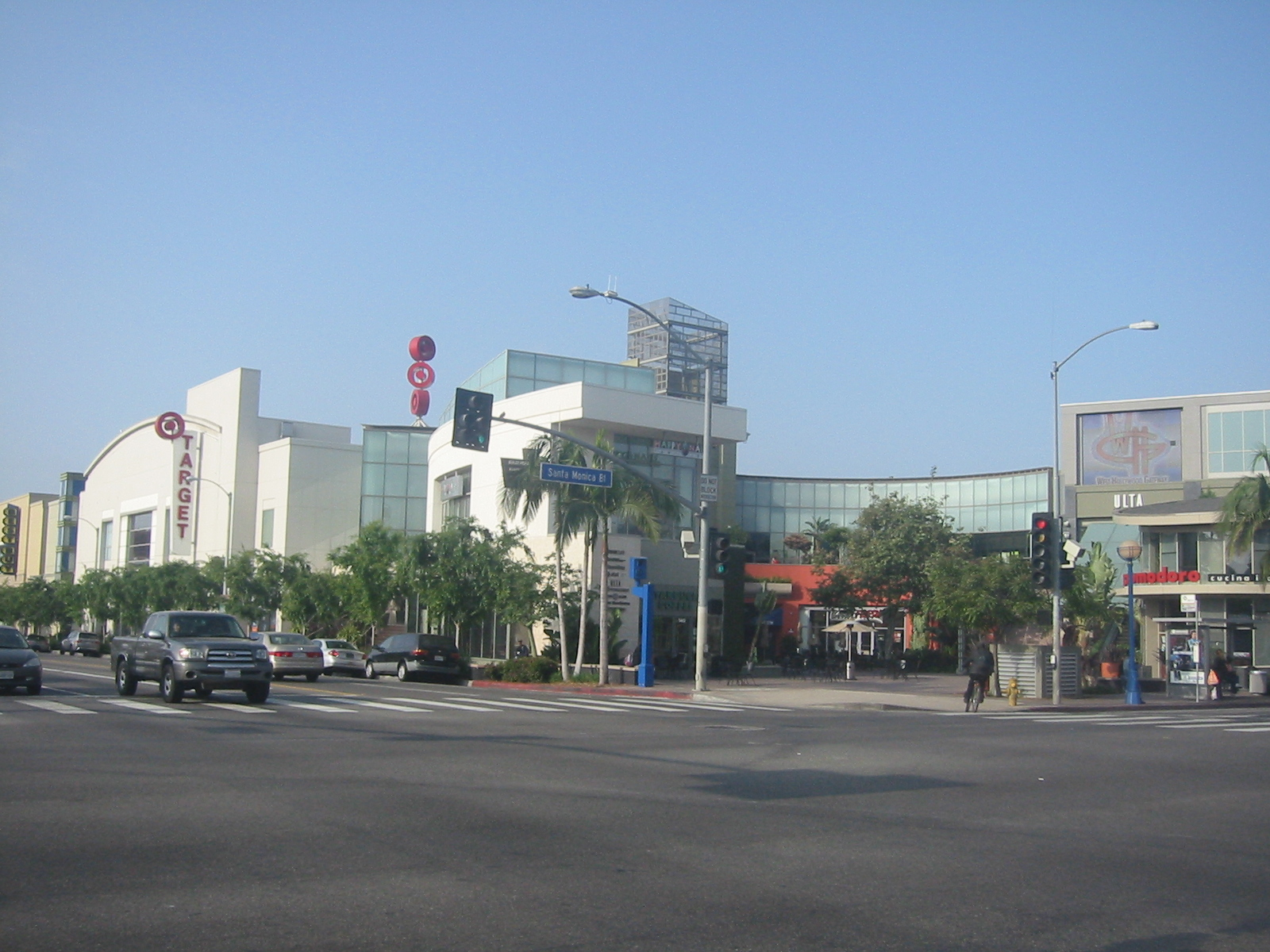
- West Hollywood Gateway exterior
- Location: 7100 Santa Monica Boulevard, West Hollywood, California
- Coordinates: 34.09°N 118.3447°W
- Opened: March 2004
- Developer: J.H. Snyder Company
- Manager: Colliers International
- Owner: Clarion Partners
- Architect: Jerde Partnership
- Num. of stores: 18
- Num. of anchor tenants: 2
- Floors: 2
- Website: wehogateway.com

The West Hollywood Gateway is a 248,000 sq ft (23,000 m^{2}) two-level urban vertical retail power center in West Hollywood, California. It was developed by the JH Snyder Company and designed by architect Jon Jerde, located on the southwest corner Santa Monica Blvd. and La Brea Avenue at the border of West Hollywood and Los Angeles. The structure features two subterranean parking levels and two above-ground retail levels.

The mall is anchored by the first big box retailers in the city, Target and Best Buy, and it also features eight restaurants as well as several retail stores.

Occupying a total of 257,000 square feet (23,900 m^{2}), construction on the West Hollywood Gateway began in September 2002 as part of the City of West Hollywood's Santa Monica Blvd. Redevelopment project. The West Hollywood Gateway opened to the public in March 2004. The site includes the free-standing famous Hollywood landmark, the Formosa Cafe.

The center "features a large outdoor plaza that functions as a civic square, inviting pedestrian activity through the use of outdoor eating areas, fountains, public art, retail kiosks and lush landscaping."

== e/MotioN video art work ==
The center is also home to the e/MotioN (2003), an artwork by video artist Paul Tzanetopoulos that uses projection technology, located above the main courtyard. e/MotioN features dynamic video projections on a large facade at a key intersection. Using vibrant colors, these projections form a constantly shifting light mural. An adjacent LED display updates hourly with real-time site images to enhance the overall visual. The artwork consists of three such projections that blend into an evolving montage, combining color, motion, and patterns to create a kinetic painting reflective of the surrounding area.

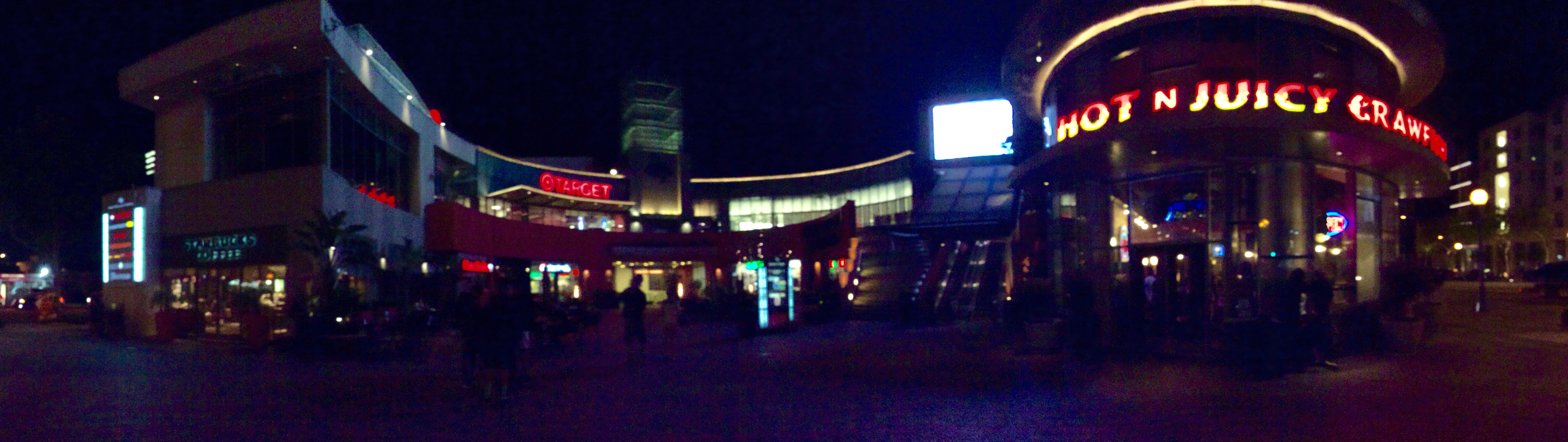
The night panorama view of the plaza.
