= Formosa Cafe =

Coordinates: 34°05′26″N 118°20′45″W

- Interactive map of Formosa Cafe

Restaurant information
- Established: 1925; 101 years ago
- Food type: American Chinese cuisine
- Location: 7156 Santa Monica Blvd., West Hollywood, California, 90046, United States
- Website: theformosacafe.com

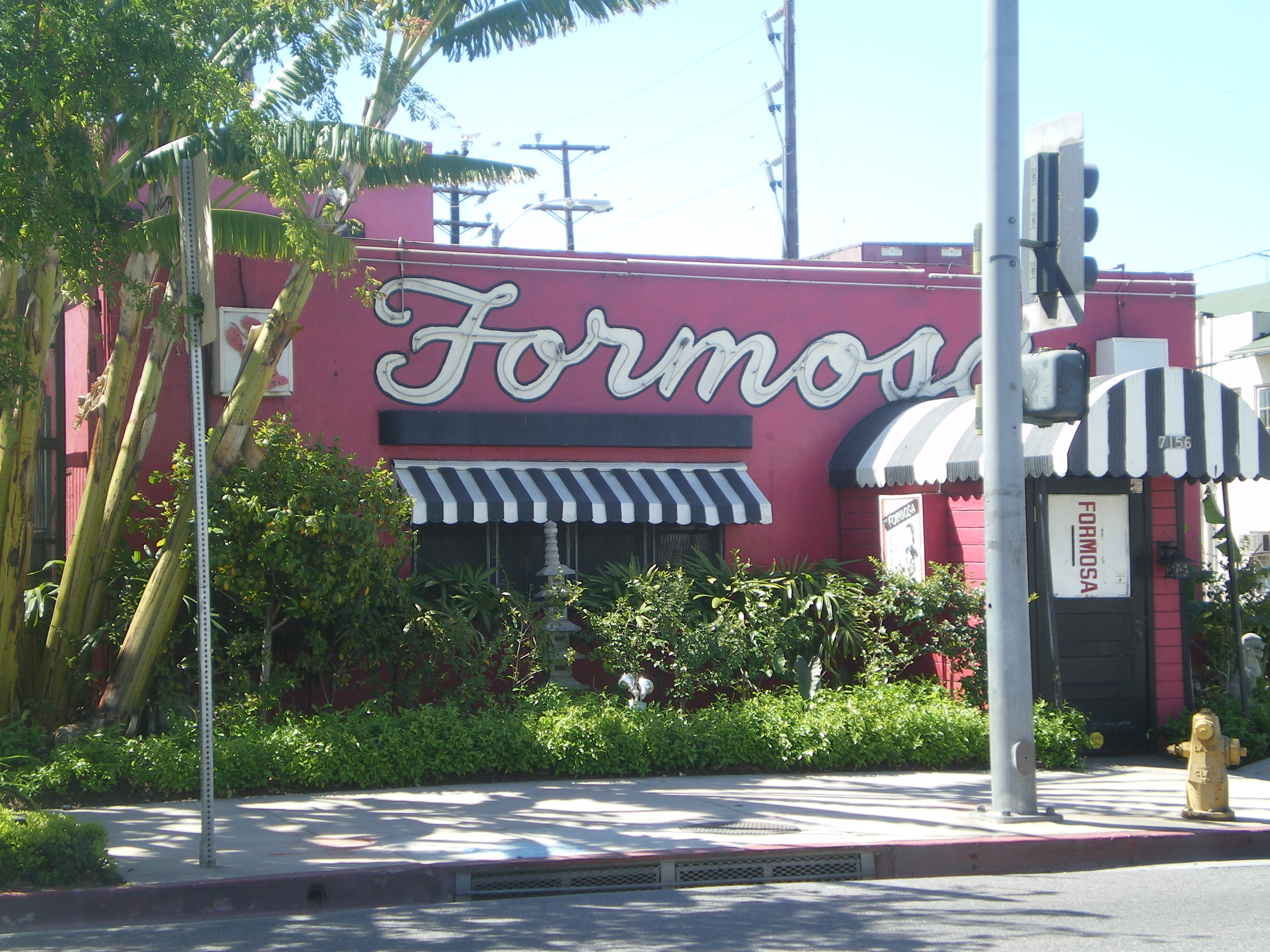
Formosa Cafe in West Hollywood, California, in 2008

The Formosa Cafe is a restaurant and bar founded in 1925 and located at 7156 Santa Monica Boulevard at the intersection with North Formosa Avenue, in West Hollywood, California.

The Formosa was founded in 1925 by 1920s prize-fighter Jimmy Bernstein. Bernstein operated his establishment initially in a Red Car trolley located just east of The United Artists studio lot. In 1945, Lem Quon went into partnership with Bernstein, taking full ownership in 1976 when Bernstein died. The restaurant remained in the family with Quon's grandson, Vince Jung, managing it. Several long-term employees worked for decades at the Formosa Cafe, including bartender Lindy Bremerton who worked there for almost 50 years, waitresses Mary Kay Moore (over 40 years), bartender Nick Pappas (over 30 years) and Catherine (Cass) Marples (over 25 years).

The restaurant has a long history of movie star and film industry patronage due to its proximity to studio lot across the street, which began as the United Artists lot and was later owned by Warner Bros. Generations of movie stars such as Humphrey Bogart, David Janssen and Clark Gable have eaten meals at The Formosa. Frank Sinatra is reputed to have spent many nights at the Formosa in the 1950s, pining over Ava Gardner.

In 1991, the restaurant was threatened with demolition when its lease expired as plans evolved for The Lot, the soon-to-be renamed Warner Hollywood studio parking lot, and what later would become the West Hollywood Gateway shopping center. Due to concerted citizen and preservationist efforts, the restaurant was preserved in its present location as a landmark. The cuisine served at Formosa is predominantly Chinese-influenced, with Beijing Chicken, Mongolian beef, wasabi mashed potatoes, bok choy and mushrooms, pork belly skewers, Formosa Caesar salad, etc. Celebrities continued to frequent the establishment throughout its history.

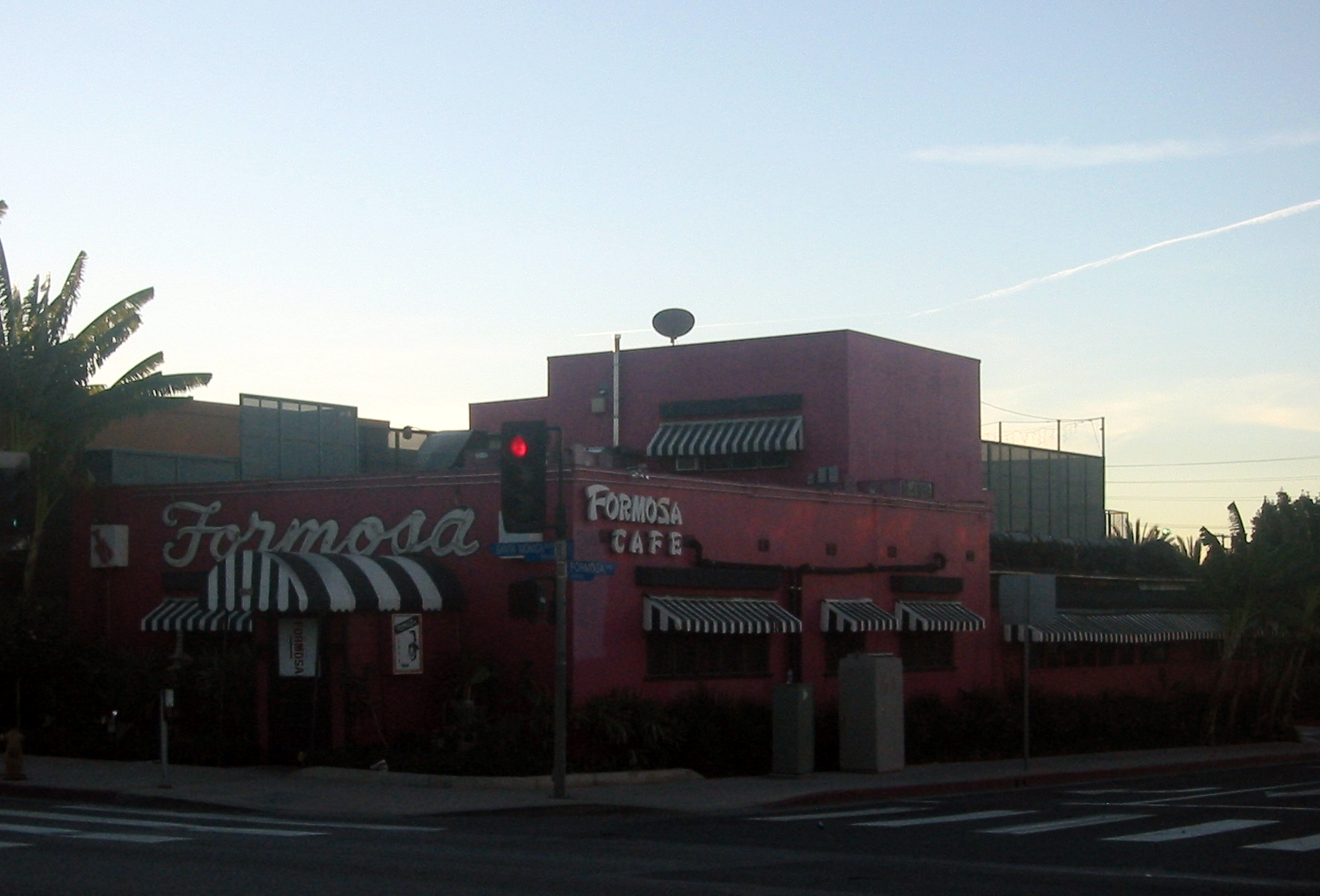
Formosa Cafe

In 2004, the historic restaurant was dwarfed by the West Hollywood Gateway shopping mall which was built to its immediate east, occupying the entire southeast corner of Santa Monica Boulevard and North La Brea Avenue.

In 2015, the restaurant's original red-and-black 1940s interiors were gutted and a "modern" interior was installed, despite clientele who enjoyed the nostalgic ambience. After negative reactions to the change, much of the original interior was rebuilt. Less than 18 months after the gutting, just before Christmas of 2016, the Formosa Cafe closed without advance notice.

In June 2017, The Los Angeles Times announced that the café would reopen with a new operator, the 1933 Group.

As of July 2021, Formosa is open again for drinks and dining.

== In popular culture ==
The interior and exterior of the Formosa Cafe can be seen in two key sequences in the 1997 movie L.A. Confidential, set in early 1950s Los Angeles. Other productions that have used the café include Swingers (1996), Nurse Betty (2000), Still Breathing (1998), The Majestic (2001), and episodes of the television series Bosch, "Blood Under the Bridge", Euphoria, "A Thousand Little Trees of Blood", and Bling Empire, "What's in Anna's Shower?" (2021).
