= The Lot at Formosa =

Studio backlot in West Hollywood

Coordinates: 34°05′22″N 118°20′47″W

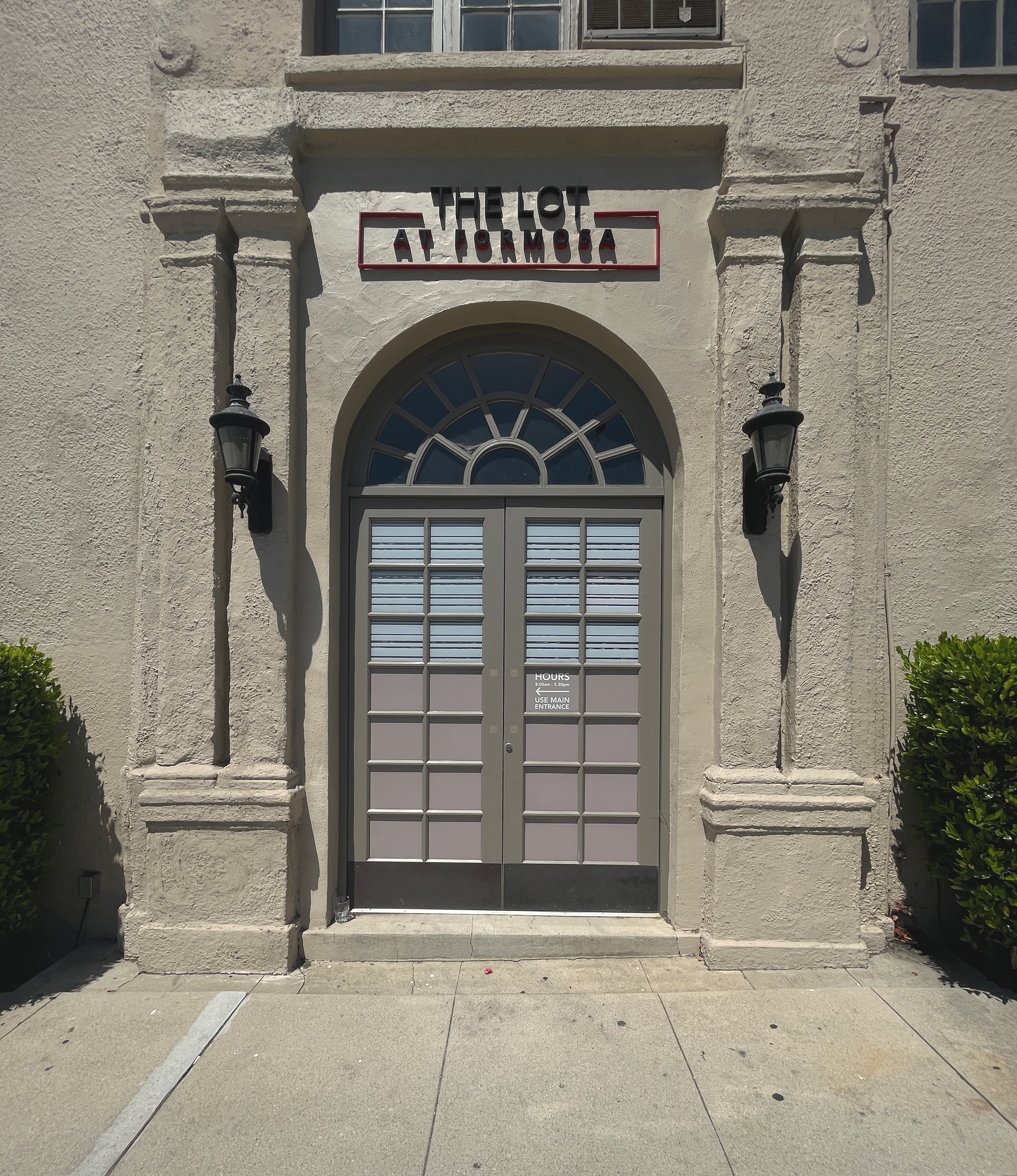
- Entrance to The Lot at Formosa
- Type: Film studio
- Predecessor: United Artists
- Fate: Folded into Warner Bros. and Metro-Goldwyn-Mayer
- Successor: Metro-Goldwyn-Mayer
- Headquarters: 1041 N Formosa Ave, West Hollywood, California
- Key people: Mary Pickford; Douglas Fairbanks; Samuel Goldwyn

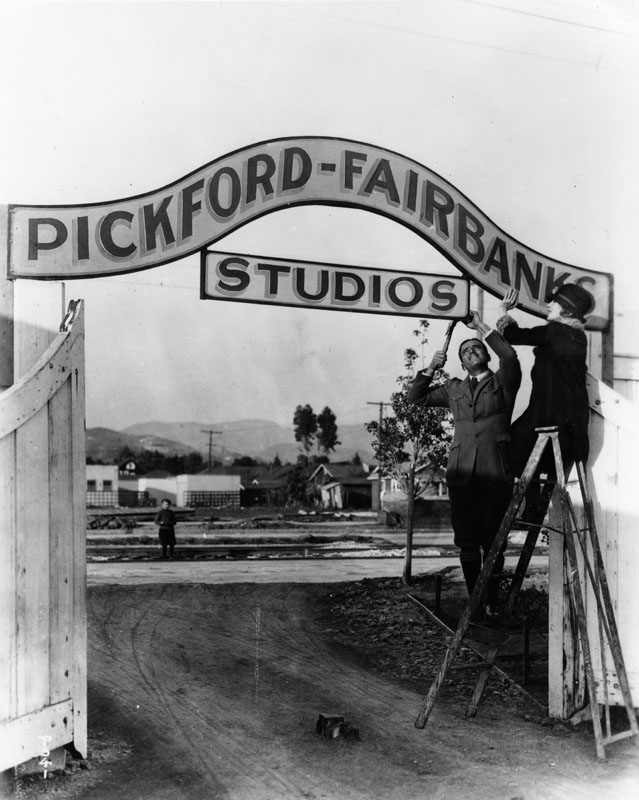
Mary Pickford and Douglas Fairbanks hang the entrance signs for their Pickford–Fairbanks Studios in Hollywood.

The Lot at Formosa is a television and movie studio lot located at the corner of Santa Monica Boulevard and Formosa Avenue in West Hollywood, California. Originally, the location was the home to the Pickford–Fairbanks Studios, and has had several names throughout the years: United Artists Studio, Samuel Goldwyn Studio, Warner Hollywood Studios, and with its name since 2007 being The Lot at Formosa.

== History ==
Originally built in 1912 and controlled by independent producer Jesse D. Hampton by 1918, the site was acquired by Mary Pickford and Douglas Fairbanks and dubbed Pickford–Fairbanks Studios on February 15, 1919, creating blockbusters such as Robin Hood (1922) and The Thief of Bagdad (1924). Along with Charlie Chaplin and D.W. Griffith, Pickford and Fairbanks founded United Artists Corporation (UA) and renamed the property United Artists Studio, where independent films such as The Gold Rush (1925) and Scarface (1932) were filmed. The lot was being used by several independent producers, including Samuel Goldwyn, that distributed through United Artists. Although Goldwyn did not control the deed for the land, he and Joseph Schenck built many of the facilities on the lot.

Schenck left United Artists in 1935, leaving his share of the deed to Goldwyn, and Fairbanks died in 1939, leaving his share to Pickford. When Goldwyn left United Artists in 1940, he sought to rename the lot Samuel Goldwyn Studio, as Samuel Goldwyn Productions was a major tenant. Pickford and Goldwyn fought over the name and ownership of the property until a court ordered that the lot be auctioned in 1955. The studio changed its name from United Artists Studio to Samuel Goldwyn Studio, where were filmed hits like Wuthering Heights (1939), The Little Foxes (1941), Guys and Dolls (1955), Some Like It Hot (1959), and West Side Story (1961).

Frank Sinatra (long-term tenant) recorded several albums, four feature films, and his own variety show, The Frank Sinatra Show at the studio. His bungalow remains standing in the remains of the studio's backlot, now home of the Los Angeles Department of Water and Power.

James Mulvey, Goldwyn's most trusted business confidant and president of Samuel Goldwyn Inc., outbid Pickford for the property. The lot officially became Samuel Goldwyn Studio and remained so until Warner Bros. purchased the site in 1980, naming it Warner Hollywood Studios.

Warner Brothers sold the studio in 1999 to private investors, who renamed it "The Lot" and continued to run the operations independently. In 2007, The Lot was acquired by CIM Group. In 2017, without being landmarked by the City of West Hollywood, several buildings were demolished and three LEED Gold, Class A Office buildings were developed at the Property. In 2021, The Lot was changed to "The Lot at Formosa" and former management company Skye Partners was removed and CIM Group began management, and HBO signs 10-year lease at the Property, occupying all seven sound stages.

On January 7, 2025, Miramax moved to The Lot at Formosa as their new headquarters, buying a selected library of United Artists films from 1919 to 1940, and Samuel Goldwyn films from 1940 to 1980.

== Awards ==
The sound department of the studio was awarded with the Academy Award for Best Sound for the film In the Heat of the Night (1967).

== See also ==
- Formosa Cafe
- Goldwyn Pictures
- Metro-Goldwyn-Mayer
- United Artists
- Samuel Goldwyn Productions
- The Samuel Goldwyn Company
- Samuel Goldwyn Films
- Samuel Goldwyn Television
