= Paul Tzanetopoulos =

Greek-American digital and video artist

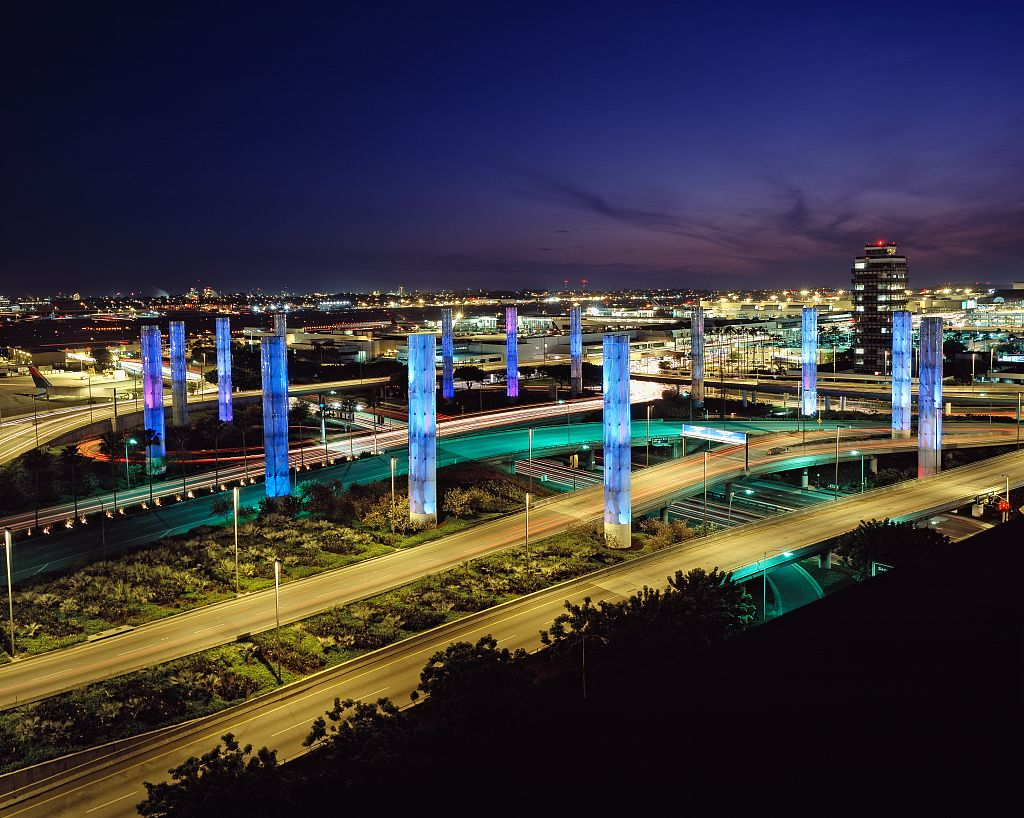
The Los Angeles International Airport light towers change colors throughout the night

Paul Tzanetopoulos (born in Athens, Greece), is a Greek-American inter-media artist known for his work with digital, video, and electronic mediums. Moving to Los Angeles over 25 years ago, Tzanetopoulos has become a prominent figure in the city's art scene. He first gained attention in 1974 when he presented a video installation and computer-driven inter-media piece at the Ruth Schaffner Gallery in Los Angeles. Since then, his work has continued to focus on social and ecological issues, often incorporating interactive elements.

Tzanetopoulos's art is part of various public and private collections, including the Los Angeles County Museum of Art (LACMA). He has also exhibited internationally and collaborated with other artists. In late October 2004, he showcased a collaborative sound and light exhibition with Daniel Rothman at Weserburg, a museum of contemporary art in Bremen in northwestern Germany.

Tzanetopoulos's art often revolves around the interaction between technology and society. His work spans different forms of media, including video, sound, and digital installations. In particular, his art highlights complex social themes, such as environmental concerns and diversity, while exploring the boundaries of light, motion, and interactivity. The artist creates works across a range of mediums, such as video, light, painting, and sculpture, and his public projects include tile murals for the US State Department's consular office in Ho Chi Minh City, Vietnam, integrated art at a Greater Los Angeles park pool, shopping center, parking garage and elsewhere. He told the Los Angeles Times that he believes "public art should be tailored to its surroundings and engage with its environment." His most recognized work is the lighting design for the pylons at Los Angeles International Airport (LAX).

== Works ==
=== LAX kinetic lighting installation ===
One of the artist's most well-known public commissions is the Kinetic Lighting Installation for the LAX Gateway Pylon Project in Los Angeles. This large-scale light display uses shifting colors to represent the city's cultural diversity. It forms the public art component of the LAX Gateway Beautification Project. Finished on August 8, 2000 by Los Angeles World Airports (LAWA), this artwork stands as the biggest permanent public art lighting setup in the world. At night, visitors can see the Kinetic Light Installation shining from within 26 large, see-through glass pylons. LAWA teamed up with the City of Los Angeles's Cultural Affairs Department to hire Tzanetopoulos. His main job was to make a large-scale public artwork using light and movement, and second, to help design a system for creative lighting in the pylons. This system had to make sure the lights fit the goal of the artwork and could be controlled easily. The pylons along Century Boulevard glow in a way that draws visitors toward the airport. The pylons at the roundabout where Sepulveda Boulevard and Century meet take their colors and motion from the flow, the intent of which is to welcome visitors.

=== e/motion 3 ===
One of Tzanetopoulos’s notable pieces is e/motion 3 (2002), a kinetic light painting created as part of West Hollywood’s Urban Art Program. e/motion 3 features dynamic video projections on a large facade at a key intersection. Using vibrant colors, these projections form a constantly shifting light mural. An adjacent LED display updates hourly with real-time site images to enhance the overall visual. The artwork consists of three such projections that blend into an evolving montage, combining color, motion, and patterns to create a kinetic painting reflective of the surrounding area. Installed at the West Hollywood Gateway shopping center on the corner of La Brea Avenue and Santa Monica Boulevard, this piece integrates six live camera feeds, projected onto a translucent building façade. The work combines real-time video, light, and movement to reflect the constant flow of life in the urban environment. The installation, a video projection triptych, transforms the façade into a living mural of changing light, color, and motion.

=== Which Green is Our Bush? ===
Premiering in 2004 at the Los Angeles Rectangle Gallery, *Which Green is Our Bush?* is a politically charged three-dimensional composition reflecting George W. Bush's stance on environmental and corporate issues. Using local broadcast television and video projections, Tzanetopoulos overlays images that critique the relative neglect of ecological imperatives. The installation blends visuals to create a dynamic commentary on contemporary concerns around environmental responsibility.

=== Solar Luna Reflections ===
Solar Luna Reflections honors a time of visionary artists. It features a reflective, 10-foot triangular prism made of embossed glass, dichroic glass, and full-color imaged glass. The sculpture includes color-changing light pavers, which work in a coordinated display. Best viewed at night, it stands at Werk Paseo, 122 W. Green Street, Pasadena, California. According to the artist, "Solar Luna Reflections celebrates Pasadena’s lesser-known but key role in the rise of experimental video, film, and avant-garde art from the 1960s to the 1980s. In the old Fair Oaks/Colorado area, dozens of artists worked in studios and lofts, creating a lively exchange of ideas during that time. The sculpture’s three sides recreate art-making, while the lights show graphic elements tied to specific Pasadena spots, my art projections, and important art venues. ‘Solar’ and ‘Luna’ refer to the sun and moon, which bring the piece to life, and ‘Reflections’ stands for the viewer’s thoughts on Pasadena’s past and how the artwork mirrors its surroundings. Solar Luna Reflections pays tribute to that era and Pasadena’s ongoing impact on art."

== Other works ==
Tzanetopoulos's other works include:

- Different Strokes a tile mural for the back wall surrounding the pool at Mary Bethune Park in South Los Angeles: 90 ft × 5 ft (27.4 m × 1.5 m) with graphic images of swimmers, celebrating diversity, showing people in harmony, intended to highlight the pool as a gathering place where people come together ro play and work unite to play and work together. The artwork is made of 1 in (2.5 cm) porcelain and molded glass tiles.
- Floraform, Kings Road Municipal Parking Structure, West Hollywood: series of mosaic floors placed in front of the lifts on four levels of a parking building, each of which has a design that looks like a pixelated leaf pattern, made from 1-inch square commercial tiles that are fit for outdoor use. Each floor uses a different color set: The first floor has three colors—white, black, and gray; the second floor has blue and black; the third floor has black and yellow; and the top floor has black and green, designed to assist users in remembering which level they parked their car on.
- Sidewalks in Time, wall of Ralph's grocery store, 1233 N. La Brea Avenue, West Hollywood: Four 4 ft × 8 ft (1.2 m × 2.4 m) brightly colored, geometrically arranged porcelain-on-metal panels that incorporate images of the community over time.
