= Marquette Sawyer Regional Airport =

Airport in Michigan, United States

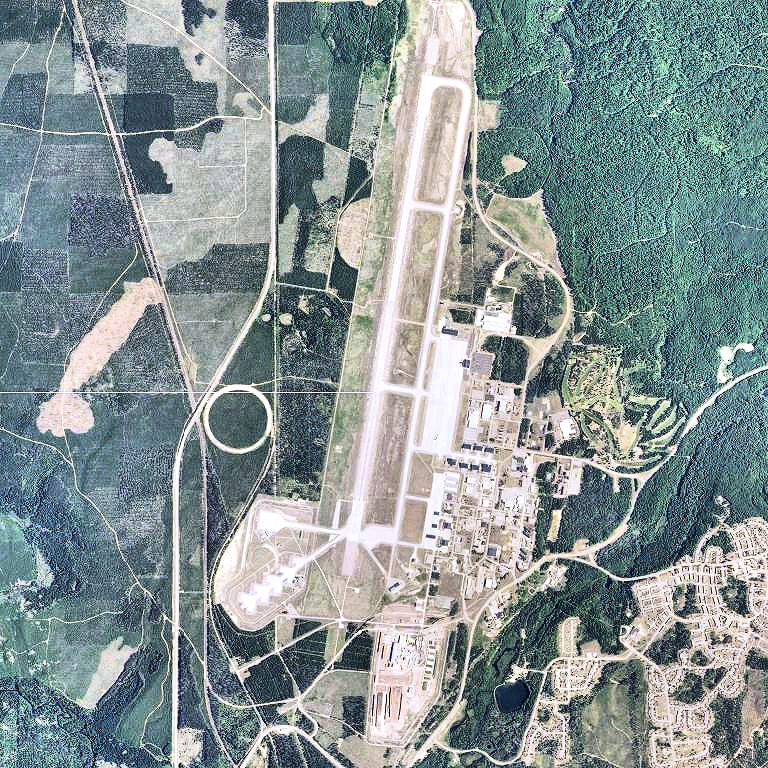
- USGS 2006 orthophoto
- IATA: MQT; ICAO: KSAW; FAA LID: SAW

Summary
- Airport type: Public
- Owner: Marquette County
- Serves: Marquette, Michigan
- Location: Gwinn, Michigan
- Opened: 1999; 27 years ago
- Elevation AMSL: 1,204 ft (367 m)
- Coordinates: 46°21′13″N 087°23′43″W
- Website: www.sawyerairport.com

Map
- Location of airport in Michigan MQT/SAW (the United States)

Runways
Direction	Length		Surface
Direction	ft	m	Surface
1/19	9,072	2,765	Asphalt/concrete

Statistics (12 months ending August 2026 ^{except where noted})
- Passenger volume: 122,610
- Departing passengers: 61,820
- Scheduled flights: 1,609
- Cargo (lb.): 811k
- Aircraft operations (2022): 17,889
- Based aircraft (2023): 41
- Sources: FAA, MDOT

Marquette Sawyer Regional Airport (IATA: MQT, ICAO: KSAW, FAA LID: SAW) — previously named Sawyer International Airport — is a county-owned, public-use airport in Marquette County, Michigan, United States. Located 17 nautical miles (20 mi; 31 km) south of Marquette, it is included in the Federal Aviation Administration (FAA) National Plan of Integrated Airport Systems for 2021–2025, in which it is categorized as a nonhub primary commercial service and general aviation facility.

Although many U.S. airports use the same three-letter location identifier for the Federal Aviation Administration (FAA) and International Air Transport Association (IATA), Marquette Sawyer Regional Airport is assigned SAW by the FAA and MQT by IATA (which assigned SAW to Sabiha Gökçen International Airport in Istanbul, Turkey).

== Facilities and aircraft ==
=== Facilities ===
The airport is located near Gwinn on a portion of the former K. I. Sawyer Air Force Base, which closed in September 1995. The airport opened for passenger service in 1999. It replaced the former Marquette County Airport, which closed the same year. Although many U.S. airports use the same three-letter location identifier for the FAA and IATA, Marquette Sawyer Regional Airport is assigned SAW by the FAA and MQT by IATA (which assigned SAW to Sabiha Gökçen International Airport in Istanbul, Turkey).

In 2022, the airport distributed a survey asking for public input in a rebranding effort. Despite public effort to include local native and renowned aeronautical engineer Kelly Johnson's name in the rebranding, the Marquette County Board of Commissioners instead voted to rename the airport to Marquette Sawyer Regional Airport as part of the $20 million renovation and re-imaging initiatives.

Telkite Technology Park is adjacent to the airport, with 1,000 acres (400 ha) of land and 1,500,000 square feet (140,000 m^{2}) of space in a Michigan Renaissance Zone, which exempts the tenant or owner from the majority of state and local taxes. The airport is home to the Marquette County Aviation Wall of Honor, which features many influential pilots and engineers.

=== Aircraft statistics ===
Marquette Sawyer Regional Airport covers an area of 2,100 acres (850 ha). It has a single asphalt/concrete runway, numbered 1 and 19, 9,072 by 150 feet (2,765 by 46 m), originally constructed in 1959 to accommodate B-52 bombers and KC-135 tankers. The airport is capable of handling aircraft as large as a Boeing 747-8 or a 777-200.

For the 12-month period ending December 31, 2022, the airport had 17,889 aircraft operations, an average of 49 per day: 56% general aviation, 35% air taxi, 1% scheduled commercial service and 8% military. In November 2023, there were 41 aircraft based at the airport: 36 single-engine, 4 multi-engine and 1 jet.

=== Upgrades ===
The airport received $18 million from the US Department of Transportation in 2020 as part of the CARES Act, which was intended to help mitigate the effects of the COVID-19 pandemic by providing funds earmarked for immediate spending to sustain operational expenses, generate loans, tax credits and paycheck protection to small businesses, along with additional protections and benefits to individuals. The airport instead opted to use those funds for airport rebranding, consulting services, art installations, hangar renovations and fire suppression system upgrades, terminal expansion, demolition of multiple buildings not currently part of airport operations and other initiatives not related to COVID-19 impacts, which will continue years after the end of the pandemic.

In 2022, the airport received a $2.7 million grant from the U.S. Department of Transportation to repair hangars. The airport is undergoing significant renovation which began in 2023. $20 million in funds are being allocated toward the project which includes a new fire suppression system in an aircraft hangar, expansion of the terminal building, and new taxiway asphalt. The air traffic control tower was recently upgraded, along with additional aircraft parking spaces and security upgrades to allow for larger commercial aircraft.

Terminal upgrades will include an upgraded entrance and facility expansion as well as new art installations. The FAA will fund part of the project and will include money from the federal CARES Act from the Covid-19 pandemic. Several buildings are being razed as part of the project.

== Airlines and destinations ==
=== Passenger ===
Airlines	Destinations
American Eagle	Chicago–O'Hare
Delta Connection	Minneapolis/St. Paul

Destinations map
Destinations from Sawyer International Airport
Red = Year-round destination
Green = Seasonal destination
Blue = Future destination
Purple = Route ending

== Statistics ==
Carrier shares (September 2025 – August 2026)
Carrier	Passengers (arriving and departing)
Envoy Air	70,020(57.58%)
SkyWest	51,590(42.42%)

Top destinations from SAW (September 2025 – August 2026)
Rank	Airport	Passengers	Carriers
1	Chicago, IL (ORD)	35,380	American
2	Detroit, MI (DTW)	14,760	Delta
3	Minneapolis/St. Paul, MN (MSP)	11,680	Delta

== Accidents and incidents ==
- On January 5, 2015, a Cessna 172 Skyhawk veered off the runway while attempting a takeoff. The plane was substantially damaged, but the pilot was uninjured.
- On September 3, 2019, a small plane impacted trees while attempting an emergency landing. After an engine failure, the aircraft overshot a field it was aiming for and landed on a nearby road before veering into trees. The pilot and his son were uninjured.

== See also ==
- List of airports in Michigan
