= Flagship Airlines =

American regional airline

| IATA | ICAO | Call sign |
|---|---|---|
| 8N | FLG | FLAGSHIP |
- Founded: June 1, 1991; 34 years ago (amalgamation)
- Ceased operations: May 15, 1998; 28 years ago (merged with Wings West Airlines and Simmons Airlines to form American Eagle Airlines)
- Hubs: Miami; Nashville; New York–JFK; Raleigh/Durham
- Headquarters: Nashville International Airport, Nashville, Tennessee, United States

Flagship Airlines was an American regional airline headquartered on the grounds of Nashville International Airport in Nashville, Tennessee, United States.

== History ==
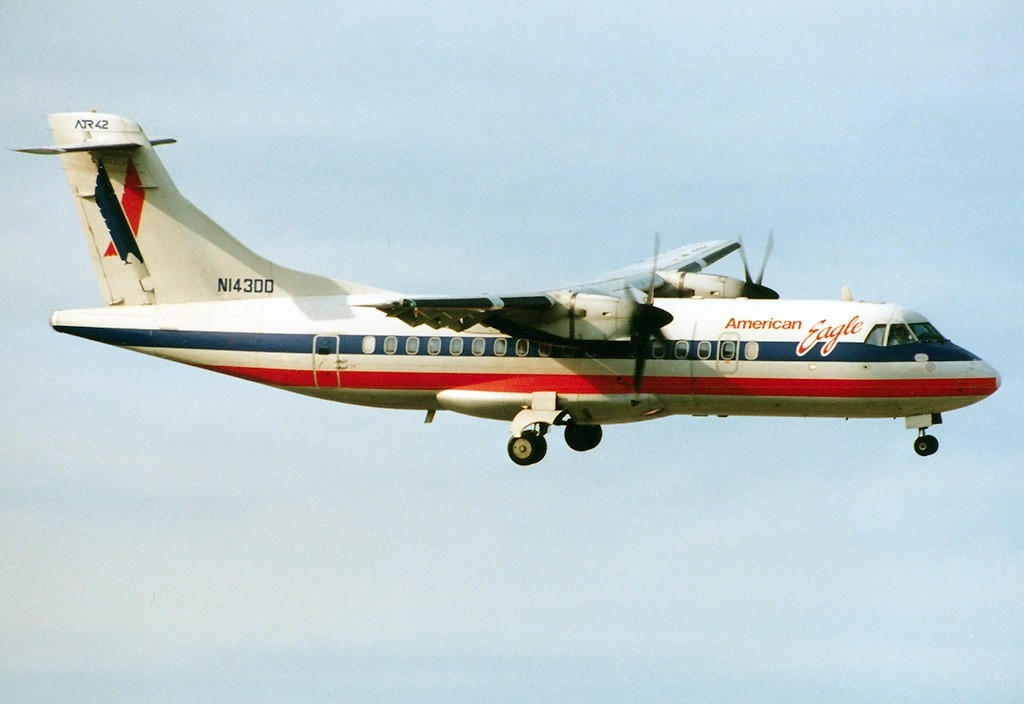
ATR 42-300 in full American Eagle livery

Flagship Airlines traced its origins to Air Virginia, a commuter and regional feeder air carrier, which later changed names to AVAir. AVAir had rapidly declined into bankruptcy following the AVAir Flight 3378 tragedy. AMR Corporation founded Nashville Eagle out of the assets of AVAir and Air Midwest. Flagship Airlines was formed by the merger of Command Airways into Nashville Eagle on June 1, 1991.

Flagship operated code sharing flights for American Airlines under the American Eagle brand name. The airline served the East Coast and the Bahamas from hubs at Miami, Nashville, New York-JFK, and Raleigh/Durham. The Raleigh/Durham based closed on December 28, 1994.

Ultimately, Flagship Airlines merged with Simmons Airlines and Wings West Airlines to form American Eagle Airlines in 1998. The former Simmons IATA two letter code of MQ became the surviving identifier for the unified airlines. In 2014, the airline was renamed Envoy Air.

== Fleet ==
Flagship Airlines fleet in 1994
| Aircraft | Total | Passengers |
|---|---|---|
| ATR-42 | 14 | 46 |
| BAe Jetstream 32 | 48 | 19 |
| Saab 340 | 53 | 34 |
| Shorts 360 | 20 | 36 |

== Accident ==
On 13 December 1994, Flagship Airlines Flight 3379, operating for American Eagle, entered an aerodynamic stall when the flight's captain failed to follow any of the procedures for a single-engine go-around while aborting an approach to Raleigh–Durham International Airport in North Carolina, crashing into a wooded area. The two pilots and 13 of the 18 passengers were killed.

== See also ==
- List of defunct airlines of the United States
