= Oxnard Airport =

General aviation airport in Oxnard, California

Oxnard Airport Ventura County Army Airfield
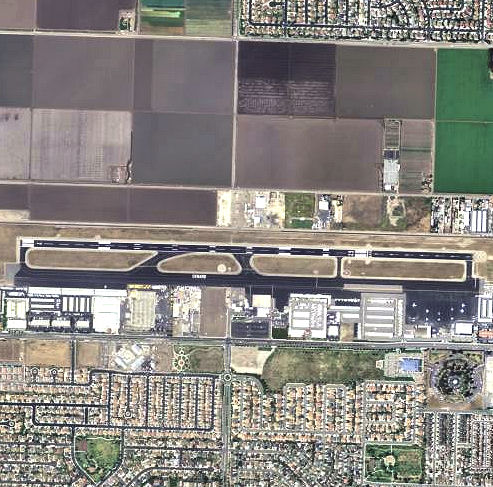
- USGS 2006 orthophoto
- IATA: OXR; ICAO: KOXR; FAA LID: OXR

Summary
- Airport type: Public
- Owner: County of Ventura
- Serves: Oxnard, California
- Elevation AMSL: 45 ft / 14 m
- Coordinates: 34°12′03″N 119°12′26″W

Maps
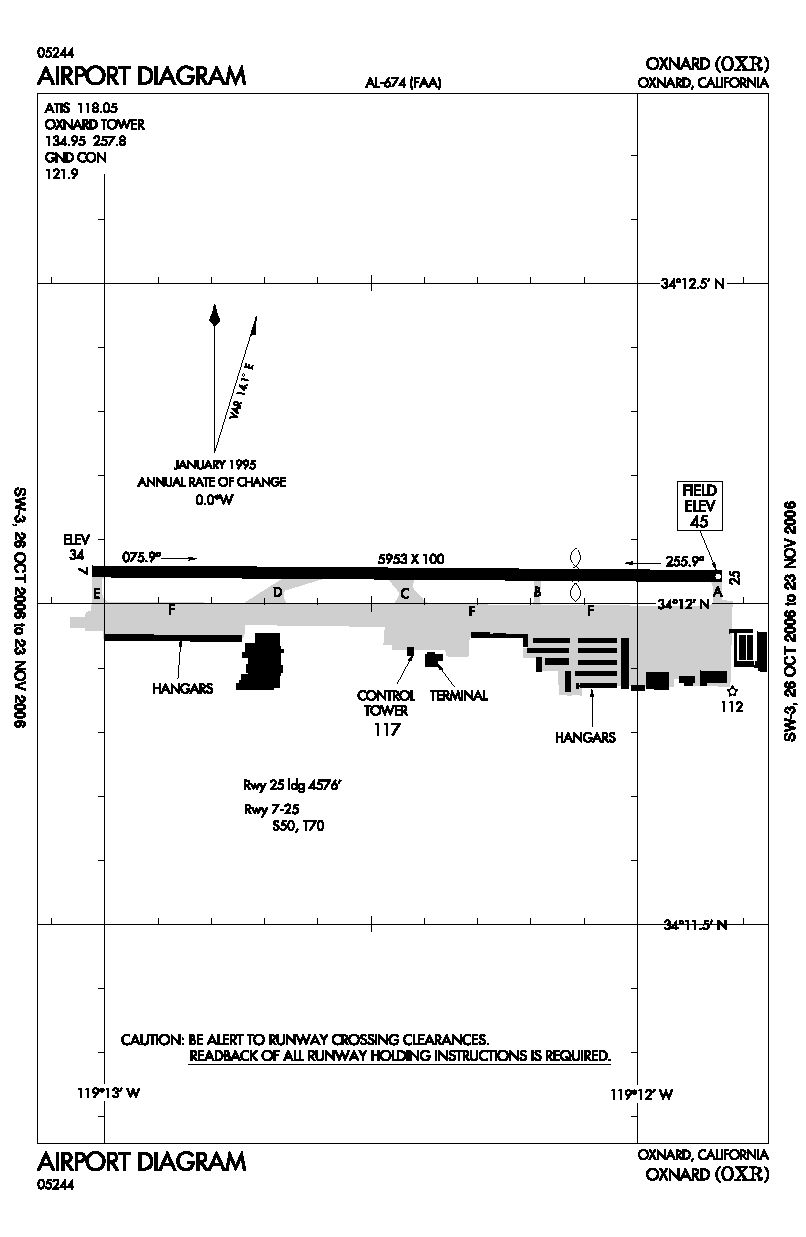
- FAA airport diagram

- Location of airport in California

Runways
| Direction | Length | | Surface |
| Direction | ft | m | Surface |
|---|---|---|---|
| 7/25 | 5,953 | 1,814 | Asphalt |

Statistics (2010)
- Aircraft operations: 55,323
- Based aircraft: 157
- Source: Federal Aviation Administration

Oxnard Airport (IATA: OXR, ICAO: KOXR, FAA LID: OXR) is a county-owned, public airport a mile west of downtown Oxnard, in Ventura County, California. The airport has not had scheduled passenger service since June 8, 2010, when United Express (operated via a code sharing agreement with United Airlines by SkyWest Airlines) ended flights to Los Angeles International Airport. America West Express also served the airport with nonstop flights to Phoenix in the early-2000s via a code sharing agreement with America West Airlines.

Federal Aviation Administration records say the airport had 15,961 passenger boardings (enplanements) in calendar year 2008, 12,060 in 2009 and 4,074 in 2010. The National Plan of Integrated Airport Systems for 2011–2015 called it a primary commercial service airport based on enplanements in 2008 (over 10,000 per year). By the time of the next NPIAS report, for 2015–2019, Oxnard Airport had been downgraded to a regional general aviation airport with only 19 enplanements.

== History ==
Ventura County opened Oxnard Airport in 1934 by clearing a 3,500 ft dirt runway. In the 1930s aviator Howard Hughes erected a tent at the airport to shelter his famous H-1 monoplane racer, which he tested from the dirt strip. In 1938 Ventura County paved the dirt runway and built a large hangar. In 1939 James McLean opened the Oxnard Flying School with a Piper J-3 Cub and a Kinner 2-seat airplane. Housing was built nearby for instructors and students at the school.

In late 1941, the airport was assigned to the U.S. Navy until the Naval Air Station at Point Mugu could be completed. The Navy moved to NAS Point Mugu in 1945 and the Oxnard Flying School returned to the airport. Ventura County regained control of the airport in 1948, receiving a final quitclaim deed. The state of California issued the airport an operating permit in 1949.

In 2025, AXIS Air began operating at Oxnard Airport as a full-service fixed-base operator (FBO). The company occupies the former Golden West Jet Center facility, continuing the site’s long history of serving general aviation at the airport. AXIS Air provides fueling, aircraft parking, hangar space, and pilot services for a variety of aircraft types. AXIS Air also introduced a notable aviation landmark, hosting a beautifully restored 1945 Douglas DC-3 in its hangar, which has contributed to both the airport’s character and visibility within the aviation community.

== Past airline service ==
Scheduled airline service started in 1946 with Southwest Airways flying Douglas DC-3s on a multi-stop route between Los Angeles and San Francisco. Southwest then changed its name to Pacific Air Lines which in turn began operating Martin 4-0-4 prop aircraft followed by Fairchild F-27 turboprops into the airport. In 1968 Pacific merged with Bonanza Air Lines and West Coast Airlines to form Air West which was subsequently renamed Hughes Airwest which in turn continued to serve Oxnard with F-27s. Also in 1968, Cable Commuter Airlines was operating de Havilland Canada DHC-6 Twin Otter service to LAX.

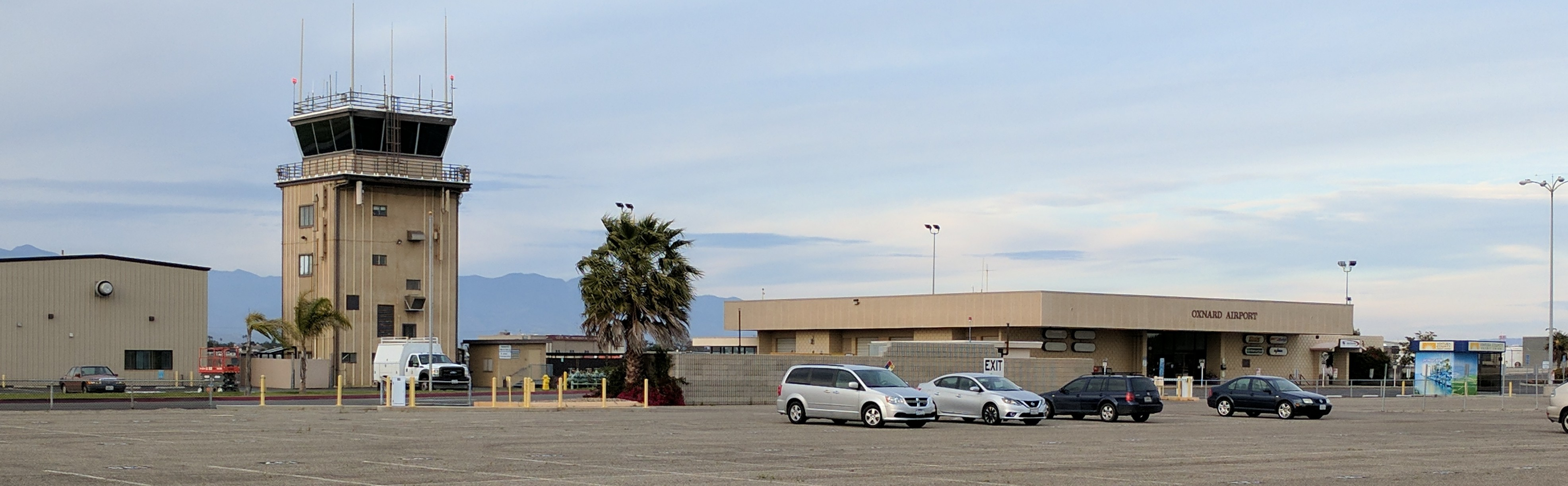
Oxnard Airport

Hughes Airwest ended all service to Oxnard in the early 1970s and was then replaced by Golden West Airlines and other commuter air carriers. Golden West operated de Havilland Canada DHC-6 Twin Otter and Short 330 turboprops nonstop to Los Angeles (LAX), San Diego and Santa Barbara. According to the Official Airline Guide (OAG), in the fall of 1979 Golden West was operating shuttle service from LAX to the airport with 15 nonstop flights operated every weekday with Twin Otter commuter turboprops. Other service included Wings West with Beech 99 turboprops to Los Angeles and Desert Pacific Airlines flying Piper twin prop aircraft nonstop to San Francisco, Sacramento and Las Vegas. By 1980, Golden Gate Airlines was operating nonstop service to Bakersfield, Las Vegas, Monterey, and Santa Barbara with direct service to San Francisco. Also in 1980, Santa Barbara-based Apollo Airways was operating nine nonstop flights every weekday with Handley Page Jetstream commuter propjets from Santa Barbara (SBA) with direct connecting service from Bakersfield (BFL), Fresno (FAT), Las Vegas (LAS), Monterey (MRY), Oakland (OAK), Sacramento (SMF), San Francisco (SFO) and San Jose (SJC) via Santa Barbara. In 1981, two airlines were serving the airport according to the Official Airline Guide (OAG): Golden West Airlines with ten nonstop flights every weekday from Los Angeles (LAX) plus two nonstop flights every weekday from San Diego (SAN) primarily flown with Twin Otter aircraft with some flights being operated with the Short 330, and Apollo Airways operating Handley Page Jetstreams with five nonstop flights every weekday from Santa Barbara (SBA) with this Apollo service featuring connecting flights via Santa Barbara from the California cities of Bakersfield (BFL), Fresno (FAT), Monterey (MRY), Oakland (OAK), Sacramento (SMF), San Francisco (SFO) and San Jose (SJC).

Oxnard never received scheduled jet service; however, the airport did have Embraer EMB-120 Brasilia propjet service operated by WestAir as United Express nonstop to San Francisco (SFO) in the 1990s. By 2001, America West Express operated by Mesa Airlines via a code sharing agreement with America West Airlines was flying nonstop service to Phoenix (PHX) with de Havilland Canada DHC-8 Dash 8 propjets. Most service was operated to LAX with a few flights to Santa Barbara, Santa Maria and other cities at this time. In 1985, Evergreen Airspur, a division of Evergreen International Airlines, was operating de Havilland Canada DHC-6 Twin Otters to LAX. In 1987 Resort Commuter Airlines was operating nonstop service to LAX as a Trans World Express air carrier on behalf of Trans World Airlines (TWA). By 1988 Qwest Air was flying nonstop service to San Diego (SAN) and Sacramento (SMF) with Dornier 228 commuter turboprops. Also during the late 1980s into the mid-1990s, two airlines were flying Oxnard-LAX service: American Eagle operated by Wings West flying Fairchild Swearingen Metroliner propjets and United Express operated by WestAir flying British Aerospace BAe Jetstream 31 propjets. The United Express service would later be taken over by SkyWest Airlines with this airline operating Embraer EMB-120 Brasilias. United Express subsequently ended all scheduled passenger flights at the airport and Oxnard no longer has passenger airline service but is served by two cargo airlines.

California Air Shuttle was a commuter airline based at the Oxnard Airport. In 1990, it briefly operated nonstop service with a Swearingen Metro II propjet aircraft between the airport and Las Vegas, San Francisco, San Jose and Sacramento. This new start-up air carrier quickly went out of business.

== Facilities and aircraft ==
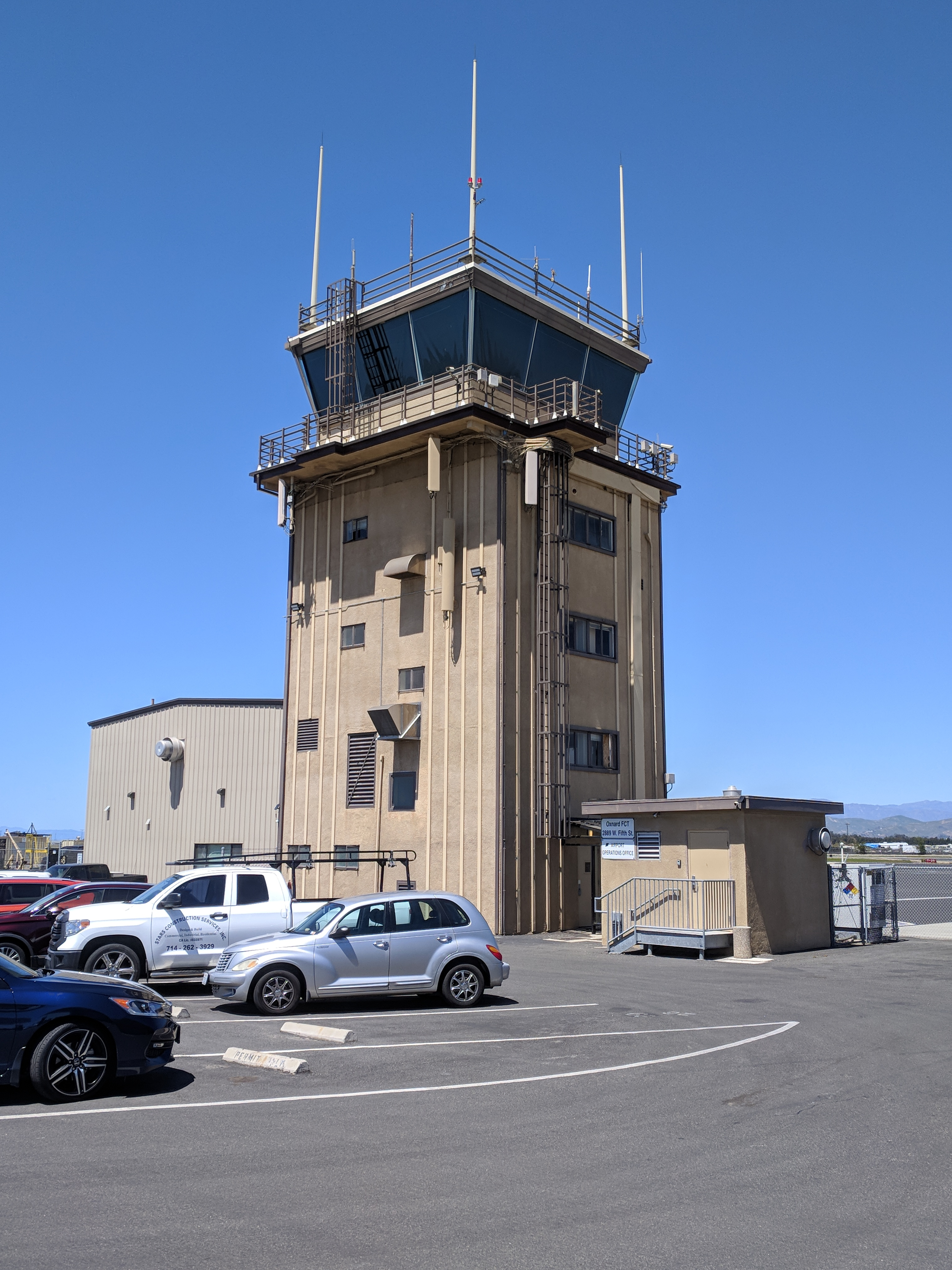
Oxnard Airport control tower

Oxnard Airport covers 230 acres (93 ha) at an elevation of 45 feet (14 m) above mean sea level. Its one runway, 7/25, is 5,953 by 100 feet (1,814 x 30 m) asphalt. Fuel, parking and hangar space is available from private vendors at the airport.

In 2010 the airport had 55,323 aircraft operations, average 151 per day: 92% general aviation, 8% air taxi, and <1% military. 157 aircraft were then based at this airport: 79% single-engine, 17% multi-engine, and 5% helicopter.

In 2025, iSkydive, a recreational skydiving company began offering tandem jumps with five- to seven-minute fall within sight of the Pacific Ocean. Formerly based at the Camarillo Airport, the move allowed take off and touchdown to occur at the airport. A landing zone in Somis was used when taking off from the Camarillo Airport which was retained for use when the marine layer is thick in Oxnard.

=== Fixed-Base Operators ===
AXIS Air is a full-service FBO that offers premium hangar leasing, aircraft parking, fueling, ground handling, and concierge services. Located on the Oxnard Airport ramp, AXIS Air’s facility also includes the historic DC-3 Mainliner, adding both heritage and inspiration to the airport experience.

== Airlines and destinations ==
=== Cargo ===
| Airlines | Destinations |
|---|---|
| Ameriflight | Seasonal: Burbank |

== Incidents ==
A single-engine Mooney M20C private plane crashed on July 10, 2022, into the airport fence along South Ventura Road during final approach while attempting to land. The pilot had minor injuries and the road was closed until the damaged plane could be removed. The fire department reported that the pilot got out of the aircraft on his own and that a fuel spill had occurred.

== See also ==
- California World War II Army Airfields
