= AVAir Flight 3378 =

1988 aviation accident

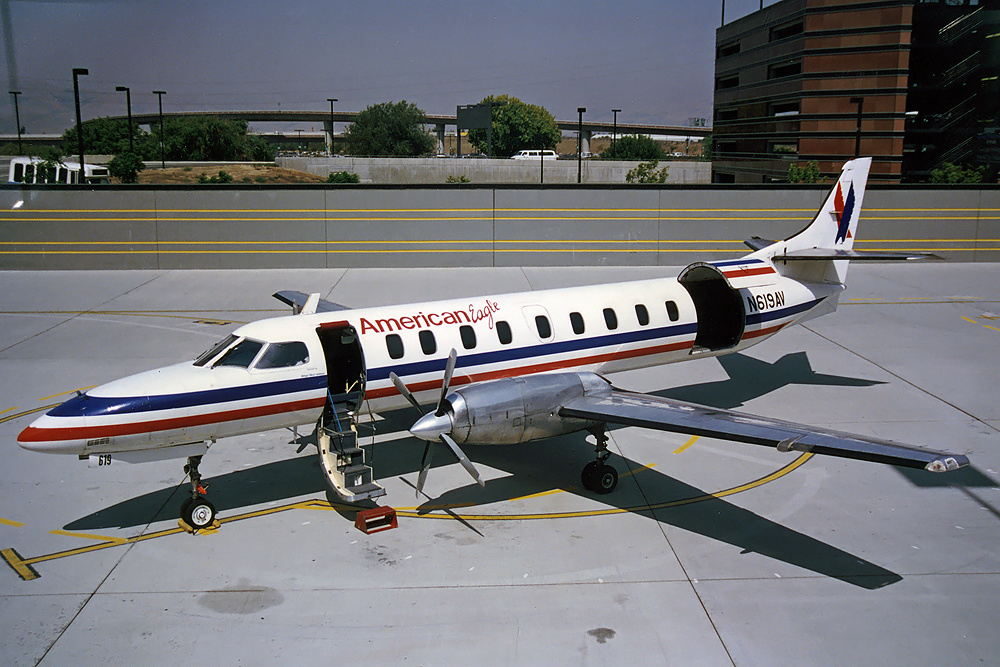
- An Air Virginia Fairchild Metroliner at that time operated by American Eagle similar to the one involved.

Accident
- Date: February 19, 1988
- Summary: Controlled flight into terrain due to pilot error
- Site: Cary, North Carolina, United States of America; 35°52′08″N 78°48′36″W

Aircraft
- Aircraft type: Fairchild Swearingen Metroliner
- Operator: AVAir (Air Virginia) dba American Eagle
- ICAO flight No.: FVA378
- Call sign: AIR VIRGINIA 378
- Registration: N622AV
- Flight origin: Raleigh-Durham Airport
- Destination: Richmond International Airport
- Occupants: 12
- Passengers: 10
- Crew: 2
- Fatalities: 12
- Survivors: 0

AVAir Flight 3378 was a scheduled flight from Raleigh–Durham International Airport to Richmond International Airport operated by Air Virginia that crashed after takeoff from Raleigh-Durham International Airport late on the night of February 19, 1988. All 12 people on board were killed in the accident.

== Accident sequence ==
The weather at the time of the accident included a low ceiling and low visibility. The flight crew consisted of Captain Walter R. Cole Jr., 38, and First Officer Kathleen P. Digan, 28. The aircraft did not carry a cockpit voice recorder (CVR) or a flight data recorder (FDR) and was not required to at the time.

AVAir Flight 3378 took off from Raleigh–Durham International Airport at 21:25 local time and climbed to a height of 300 feet (91 m). Shortly after, the last transmission from the aircraft to the air traffic control was heard. The aircraft maintained an appropriate climb speed but at an excessive rate of turn, 40 to 45 degrees; a standard turn rate would have been 22 degrees. Due to the turn, the plane started to descend. The aircraft then struck the water in a reservoir 100 feet (30 m) from the shoreline, at a point 5100 feet west of runway 23R. The wreckage then continued onto land and into a forest. Some post-crash fires also were seen at the crash site, but were quickly extinguished.

According to the local controller, he heard but could not see the immediate previous plane, an American MD-80, depart. He saw the MD-80 on radar and cleared AVAir 3378 for departure. He briefly saw AVAir 3378 in the air, observed it on radar, and then cleared a Piedmont airplane to depart. In the next 3 minutes, he cleared a Cessna to land, coordinated with the departure controller, and attempted to locate AVAir 3378. At 2131:45, the RDU local controller alerted the emergency systems.

This accident was rated as unsurvivable by the NTSB due to extreme destruction of the aircraft.

== Investigation ==
The NTSB published its report into the disaster on December 13, 1988. They found that the preliminary cause of the accident was the failure of the flight crew to maintain a proper flight path because of the improper instrument scanning by the first officer and the flight crew's response to a perceived fault in the stall warning system. Contributing features were the lack of company response to documented indications of difficulties in the first officer's piloting, and the lack of FAA surveillance of AVAir.

In 1993, the Air Line Pilots Association (ALPA) filed a petition against the findings of the investigation and asked it to be reconsidered. The NTSB accepted the petition in part. The causes of the crash were changed to: "The probable cause of this accident was the failure of flight crew to maintain a proper flightpath. Contributing factors were the ineffective management and supervision of flight crew training and operations and inappropriate FAA surveillance of AVAir."

== Memorial ==
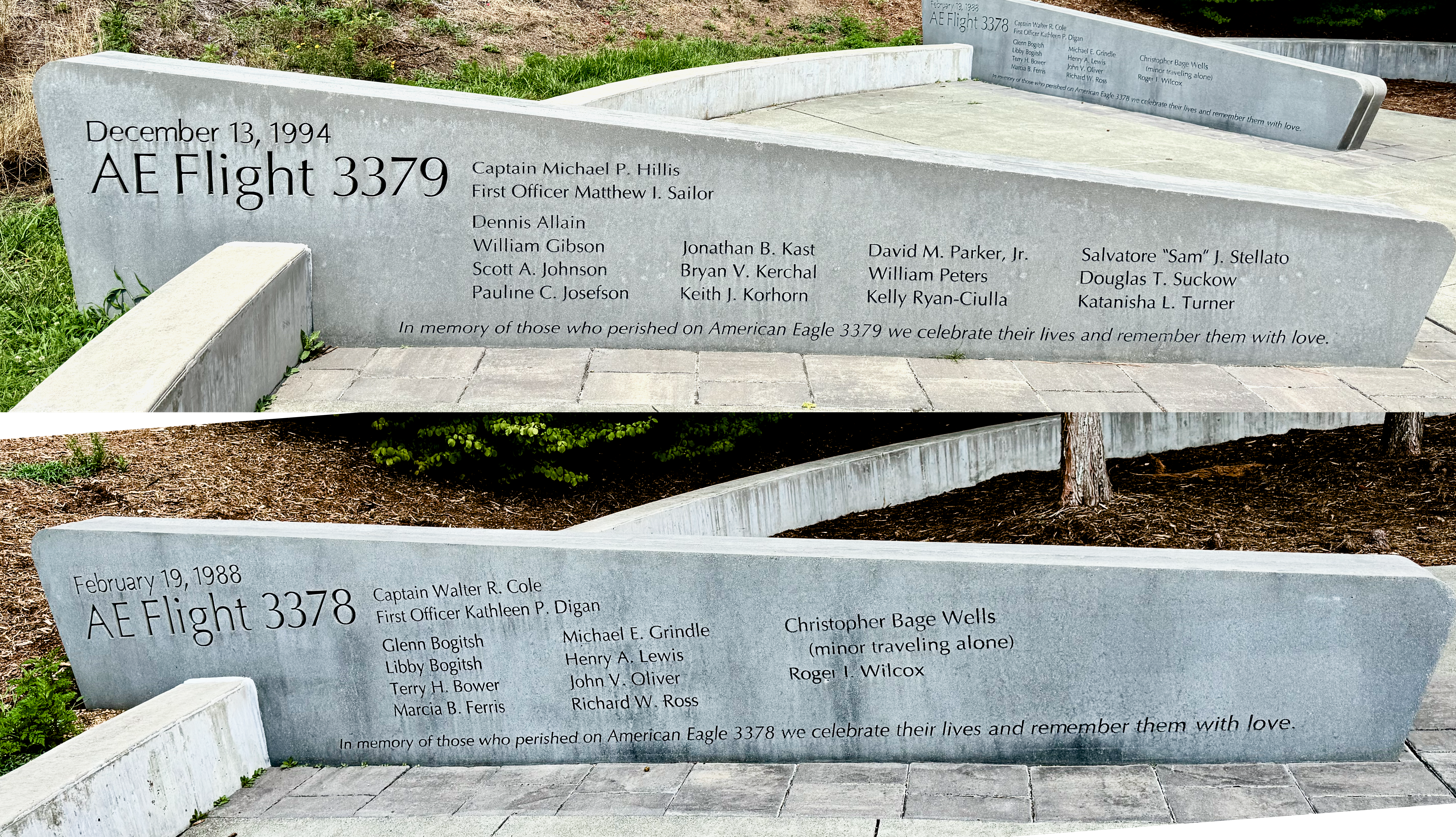

In May 2016, a memorial was dedicated at Carpenter Park in Cary, NC, USA to the passengers, crew, families, and responders of both Flight 3378 and Flagship Airlines Flight 3379, which crashed near RDU Airport in 1994. The memorial garden includes 27 shrubs representing the lives lost in both accidents, and five evergreen trees representing the five survivors of flight 3379.
