= Command Airways =

US regional airline (1966–1988)

IATA	ICAO	Call sign
DD	CMD	—
- Founded: 1965; 61 years ago
- Ceased operations: 1988; 38 years ago
- Hubs: Dutchess County Airport
- Focus cities: New York City
- Alliance: American Airlines
- Fleet size: 15
- Destinations: 13
- Headquarters: Poughkeepsie, New York, U.S.
- Key people: Kingsley G. Morse (founder / CEO)

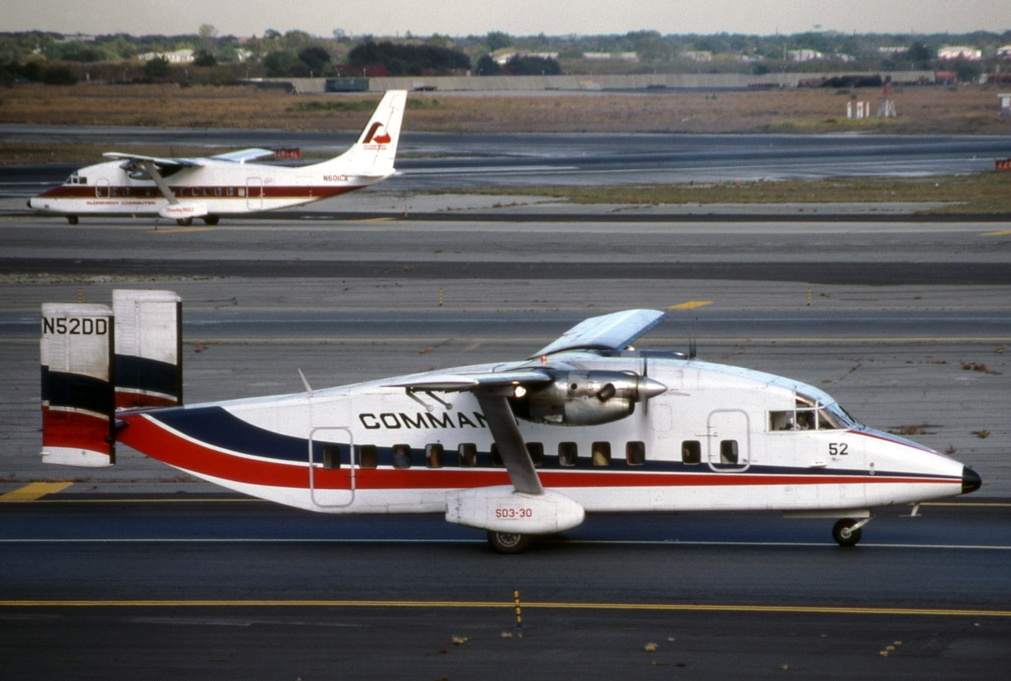
A Command Airways Shorts 330 taxiing at John F. Kennedy International Airport in 1984

Command Airways (IATA: DD) was a United States regional airline based at the Dutchess County Airport in Wappinger, New York, just outside Poughkeepsie, which was operational from 1966 to 1988.

== History ==
The airline was founded by Kingsley G. Morse (1931–1993), who was the airline's sole CEO during its entire existence.

The company was established as Mid-Hudson Airlines in 1951. At its peak in 1988, Command Airways had 538 employees and 15 aircraft serving 13 airports.

In 1984 it began transitioning into operating in affiliation with American Airlines, much like AmericanConnection did. By maintaining independent management and separate ownership, it continued to do business in its own colors as Command Airways, although its fleet was primarily dedicated for American Airlines operations. This permitted Command to gain marketing presence associated only usually with much larger airline carriers.

Command was one of the first regional airlines to carry the American Eagle brand when it became a part of the American Eagle system which included repainting their entire fleet under the American Eagle banner. This rebranding process of regional airlines commenced circa 1985 and accelerated when American Airlines parent company began purchasing a number of smaller regional carriers after the bankruptcy (December 1987) of one of its affiliate partners named AVAir, which was operating similarly to Command Airways.

AMR Corporation the parent company of American Airlines, purchased Command Airways in 1988 and renamed it AMR Eagle/Command Airways. This and other AMR affiliate and subsidiary airlines and Flagship Airlines flew under the American Eagle banner before all parties began being referred to more simply as American Eagle in 1991.

AMR Eagle/Command Airways was operated separately until all AMR subsidiary regional carriers excluding Executive Airlines were merged into AMR Simmons Airlines, in late 1998. The new company formed from Simmons Airlines was called American Eagle Airlines (utilizing the former Simmons Airlines two letter IATA Code "MQ").

During its existence, Command Airways operated the Beech 99, de Havilland Canada DHC-6 Twin Otter, Short 330, Short 360-300 and ATR-42 turboprop airliners. Command was the first U.S. airline to operate both the Short 330 starting in 1976 and the ATR-42 beginning in 1986.

Its hub was at the Dutchess County Airport near Poughkeepsie, which CEO Kingsley Morse strongly supported in the 1970s, in preference to Stewart Airport west of Newburgh. Dutchess County Airport no longer has scheduled commercial airline service.

== Destinations ==
- New York
  - Poughkeepsie (Dutchess County Airport)* Hub
  - Albany (Albany International Airport)
  - Binghamton (Broome County Airport)
  - Ithaca (Tompkins County Airport)
  - New York (John F. Kennedy International Airport)
  - New York (LaGuardia Airport)
  - White Plains (Westchester County Airport)
- Massachusetts
  - Boston (Logan International Airport)
  - Pittsfield (Pittsfield Municipal Airport)*
- New Hampshire
  - Lebanon (Lebanon Municipal Airport)
- Vermont
  - Burlington (Burlington International Airport)
- Virginia
  - Manassas (Manassas Regional Airport)*
- Those articles marked with an asterisk (*) are no longer served by commercial airline service.

== See also ==
- List of defunct airlines of the United States
