= Wings West Airlines =

American regional airline (1979–1998)

Wings West
IATA	ICAO	Call sign
RM	WWM	WINGS WEST
- Founded: 1979; 47 years ago
- Ceased operations: May 15, 1998; 28 years ago (merged with Flagship Airlines and Simmons Airlines to form American Eagle Airlines)
- Hubs: Los Angeles; San Francisco; San Jose
- Headquarters: McChesney Field, San Luis Obispo County, California, United States

Wings West Airlines was an American regional airline headquartered at McChesney Field (SBP), unincorporated San Luis Obispo County, California. The airline initially began scheduled passenger service as an independent commuter air carrier and then subsequently became an American Eagle affiliate of American Airlines operating turboprop aircraft on code sharing flights on behalf of American.

== History ==
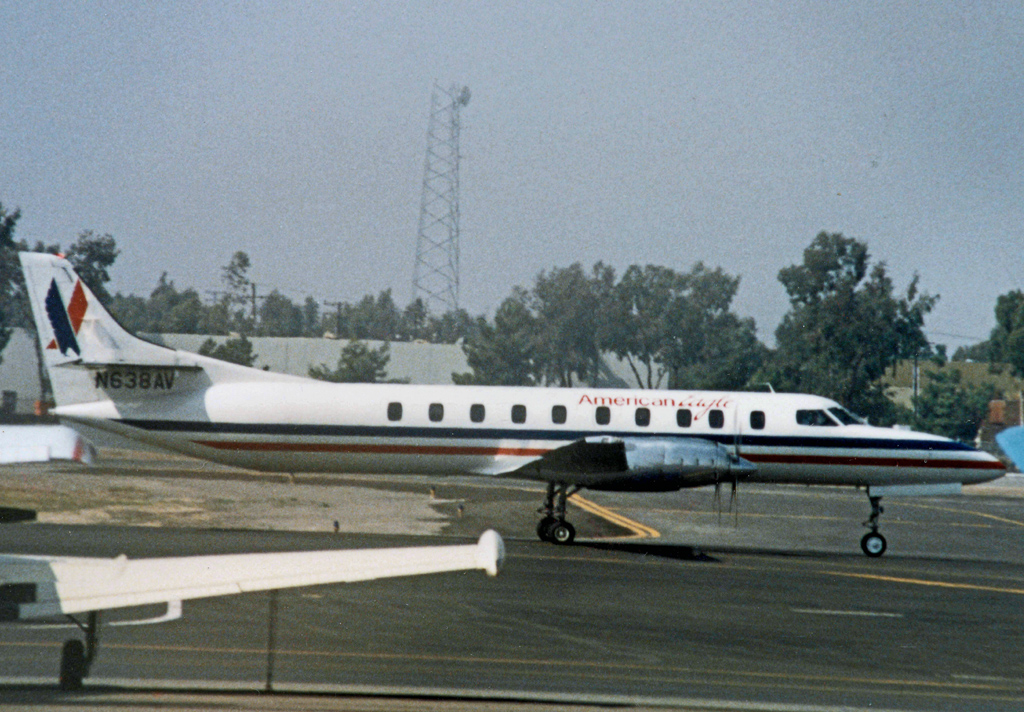
Wings West Swearingen Metro operating in American Eagle colours at John Wayne Airport California in 1986

Wings West was founded by Mark Morro and William Hirsch and began service in 1979 as a commuter air carrier flying Cessna 402 twin prop aircraft to destinations in California. Their first flight was from Santa Monica, California to Mammoth Lakes, California on 11 November 1979. In 1981, Wings West was operating service linking Mammoth Lakes and Bishop, California with Oakland, Sacramento and Santa Monica. In 1982, the airline was operating weekend nonstop service between Phoenix and Aspen, CO with Swearingen Metro propjets. Wings West became a publicly traded company in 1983.

By early 1985, Wings West had significantly expanded its route network in California as an independent commuter airline with the addition of Fairchild Swearingen Metroliner (Metro II and Metro III models) and Beechcraft C99 turboprops to their fleet and was serving Eureka/Arcata, Los Angeles (LAX), Merced, Modesto, Monterey, Oxnard, Redding, Sacramento, San Francisco (SFO), San Jose, San Luis Obispo, Santa Barbara, Santa Maria and Visalia. Service was also then expanded to Arizona. Founder Mark Morro was elected as chairman of the Regional Airline Association (RAA) in 1985.

In 1986 Wings West began flying under the American Eagle brand name via a code sharing agreement with American Airlines, feeding passengers to American and a year later was purchased by AMR Corp. In 1988, the airline was operating American Eagle service with Convair 580 turboprops on behalf of American primarily between Hollywood Burbank Airport (BUR) and the American hub in San Jose, CA (SJC). During 1991 Wings West began taking delivery of new Saab 340B turboprop aircraft. That same year, the airline was continuing to support the American Airlines hub located at San Jose International Airport in northern California with nonstop feeder service between SJC and Chico, Concord, Eureka/Arcata, Fresno, Lake Tahoe, Modesto, Monterey, Palm Springs, Redding, Sacramento, San Francisco (SFO), San Luis Obispo, Santa Barbara, Santa Rosa and Stockton in California with these flights being operated by Fairchild Swearingen Metroliner and new Saab 340B commuter propjets. Also in 1991, Wings West was operating American Eagle service into Los Angeles International Airport (LAX) with British Aerospace BAe Jetstream 31, Saab 340B and Fairchild Swearingen Metroliner turboprops nonstop from Bakersfield, Carlsbad, Fresno, Inyokern, Orange County, Oxnard, Palm Springs, San Diego, San Luis Obispo, Santa Barbara and Santa Maria in California as well as American Eagle service into San Francisco International Airport (SFO) with Fairchild Swearingen Metroliner turboprops nonstop from Lake Tahoe, Monterey, Redding, Reno, Sacramento and San Jose.

In 1996, Mary B. Jordan was named president of the airline. In 1998, Wings West was merged with two other regional air carriers, Simmons Airlines and Flagship Airlines (with both airlines also operating American Eagle service at this same time), into AMR Eagle Holdings Corporation to form American Eagle Airlines which is currently known as Envoy Air.

== Destinations ==
Wings West served the following destinations during its existence as an independent commuter airline and later as an American Eagle air carrier on behalf of American Airlines with not all of these destinations being served at the same time:

- Arizona
  - Flagstaff, Arizona (Flagstaff Pulliam Airport)
  - Phoenix (Sky Harbor International Airport)
  - Yuma (Yuma International Airport)
- California
  - Arcata (Arcata-Eureka Airport)
  - Bakersfield (Meadows Field Airport)
  - Bishop (Eastern Sierra Regional Airport)
  - Burbank (Hollywood Burbank Airport)
  - Carlsbad (McClellan-Palomar Airport)
  - Chico (Chico Municipal Airport]
  - Concord (Buchanan Field Airport)
  - Fresno (Fresno Air Terminal)
  - Inyokern (Inyokern Airport)
  - Lake Tahoe, California (South Lake Tahoe Airport)
  - Los Angeles (Los Angeles International Airport) – Hub
  - Long Beach (Long Beach Airport)
  - Hawthorne (Hawthorne Municipal Airport)
  - Mammoth Lakes (Mammoth Yosemite Airport)
  - Merced (Merced Municipal Airport)
  - Modesto (Modesto City-County Airport)
  - Monterey (Monterey Peninsula Airport)
  - Oakland (Oakland International Airport)
  - Orange County (John Wayne Airport)
  - Oxnard (Oxnard Airport)
  - Palm Springs (Palm Springs International Airport)
  - Redding (Redding Municipal Airport)
  - San Diego (San Diego International Airport)
  - San Jose (San Jose International Airport) – Hub
  - San Luis Obispo (McChesney Field) – Headquarters
  - San Francisco (San Francisco International Airport) – Hub
  - Sacramento (Sacramento International Airport)
  - Santa Barbara (Santa Barbara Municipal Airport)
  - Santa Maria (Santa Maria Public Airport)
  - Santa Monica (Santa Monica Airport)
  - Santa Rosa (Sonoma County Airport
  - Stockton (Stockton Metropolitan Airport)
  - Visalia (Visalia Municipal Airport)
- Colorado
  - Aspen (Aspen-Pitkin County Airport)
- Nevada
  - Las Vegas (McCarran International Airport
  - Reno (Reno-Cannon International Airport)
- New Mexico
  - Farmington (Four Corners Regional Airport)
- Oregon
  - Klamath Falls (Klamath Falls Airport)
- Texas
  - Amarillo
  - Lubbock
  - Dallas/Ft. Worth (DFW)

== Fleet ==
Wings West operated the following turboprop aircraft in the livery of American Eagle:

- Beechcraft C99
- British Aerospace BAe Jetstream 31 and 32
- Convair 580
- Fairchild Swearingen Metroliner (Metro III)
- Saab 340B

Wings West also operated Cessna 402 twin prop aircraft and Swearingen Metro II turboprop aircraft as an independent air carrier. As an American Eagle carrier, the airline had ordered the British Aerospace BAe ATP; however, this large turboprop aircraft was not delivered to nor operated by Wings West.

== Accidents and incidents ==
- August 24, 1984: Wings West Airlines Flight 628 midair collision. Shortly after departing the San Luis Obispo County Regional Airport on a commuter flight to San Francisco International Airport, a Wings West twin-engine Beechcraft Model 99 (N6399U) collided head-on with a private Rockwell Commander 112TC aircraft (N112SM) that was descending for a landing at the same airport; all 17 on both aircraft died. The National Transportation Safety Board attributed the crash to inadequate visual lookout on the part of both pilots, and their failure to heed the recommended communications and traffic advisory practices for uncontrolled airports.

== See also ==
- List of defunct airlines of the United States
