= Flagship Airlines Flight 3379 =

1994 aviation accident in North Carolina

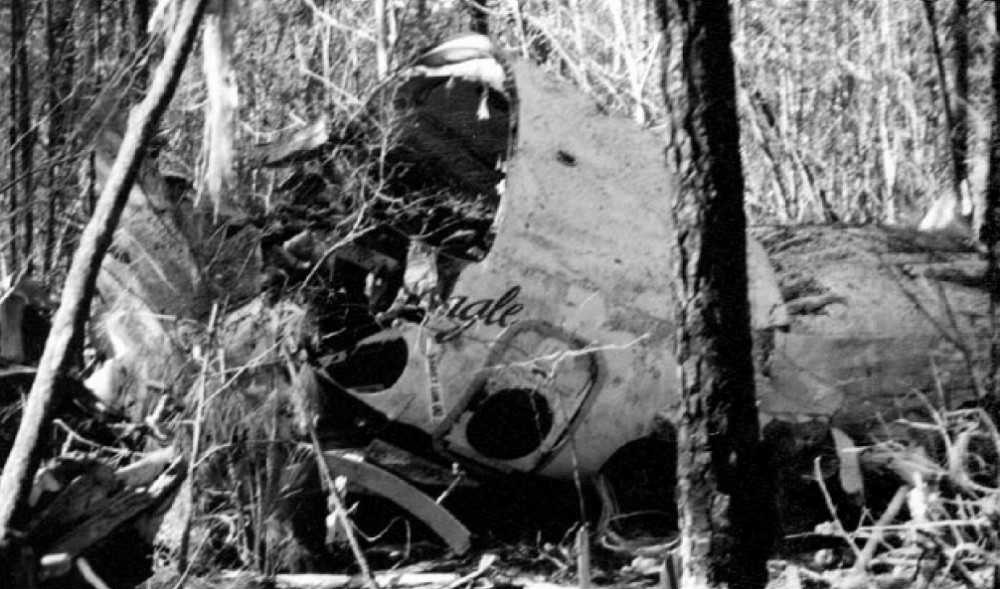
- Wreckage of the aircraft

Accident
- Date: December 13, 1994
- Summary: Loss of control following stall during go-around due to pilot error
- Site: Morrisville, near Raleigh–Durham International Airport, North Carolina, United States; 35°50′05″N 78°52′01″W

Aircraft
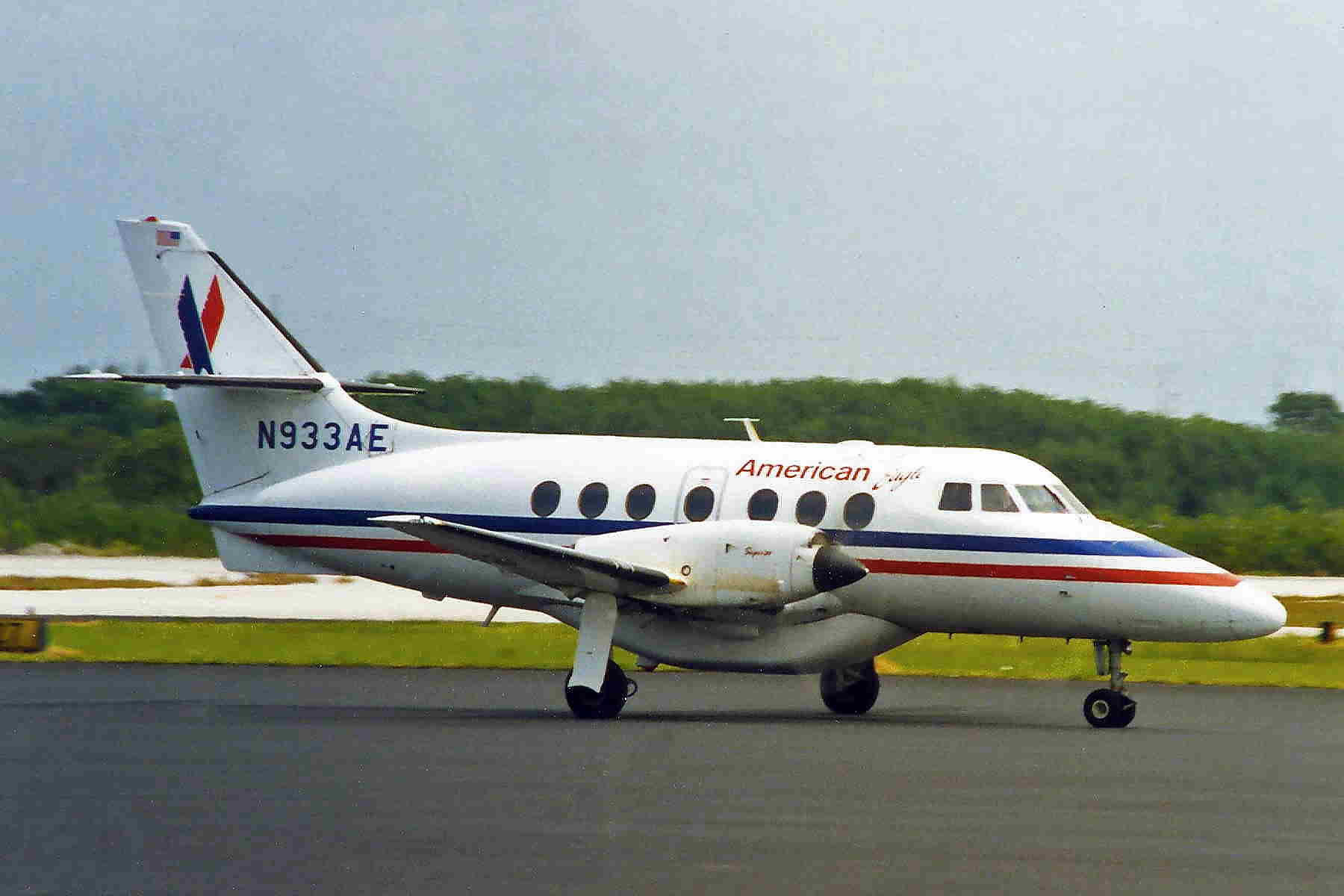
- A Flagship Airlines British Aerospace Jetstream 32, similar to the one involved in the accident
- Aircraft type: British Aerospace Jetstream 32
- Operator: Flagship Airlines on behalf of American Eagle
- Call sign: EAGLE FLIGHT 379
- Registration: N918AE
- Flight origin: Piedmont Triad International Airport, Greensboro, North Carolina
- Destination: Raleigh–Durham International Airport, Raleigh, North Carolina
- Occupants: 20
- Passengers: 18
- Crew: 2
- Fatalities: 15
- Injuries: 5
- Survivors: 5

Flagship Airlines Flight 3379 (on behalf of American Eagle) was a regularly scheduled passenger flight from Greensboro to Raleigh, North Carolina. On December 13, 1994, the aircraft operating the flight entered a stall on approach to Raleigh-Durham International Airport and crashed 4 miles southwest of the runway threshold, killing both pilots and 13 of the 18 passengers. The remaining occupants suffered injuries. The investigation found that the aircraft had executed a go-around on approach which was mishandled, leading to a midair stall and impact with the ground.

== Aircraft and crew ==
The crew consisted of captain Michael Hillis, 29, who had accumulated 3,499 total flight hours (of which 457 were in the Jetstream 32) and first officer Matthew Sailor, 25, who had accumulated a total of 3,452 flight hours, of which 677 were in the Jetstream 32.

The aircraft involved was a Flagship Airlines British Aerospace Jetstream 32, registration N918AE (serial no. 918), manufactured in 1991. It had logged 6,577 flying hours and was powered by two Honeywell TPE-331-12UHR turboprop engines.

== Accident ==
Weather along the flight route of flight 3379 was reported to be foggy with sleet and slush covering the ground at Raleigh-Durham Airport with an average temperature of 37 °F (3 °C) with steady drizzle. The flight took off from Greensboro at 18:03 local time. The flight to Raleigh was relatively uneventful. On approach to Raleigh Airport, the crew decided to perform an ILS approach to runway 5L. The aircraft descended from 9,000 feet to 3,000 feet while reducing speed. At 18:32, the flight was cleared to land to which the crew acknowledged. This was the final transmission received from the aircraft. Moments later, the CVR recorded an increase in engine power and two simultaneous stall warnings go off. The airspeed continued to decrease and the aircraft entered a rapid descent of up to 10,000 feet per minute before impacting the ground 4 miles southwest of the runway threshold, bursting into flames and killing both pilots as well as 13 of the 18 passengers. The aircraft was written off.

== Investigation ==
The National Transportation Safety Board (NTSB) opened an investigation into the cause of the crash. The analysis found that during the approach to runway 5L, the captain became distracted by a warning light going off in the cockpit and assumed that an engine had failed. In response, the captain called for a go-around and try the landing again. However, the captain mishandled the go-around procedure, allowing the aircraft's speed to decrease to the point where flight was no longer possible and the aircraft subsequently entered a stall condition. The captain also mishandled this. Despite the first officer following the captain's command to push the nose down, there was insufficient altitude for the aircraft to gain speed and recover from the stall. On October 24, 1995, the National Transportation Safety Board (NTSB) released their report on the crash. The crash was blamed on Captain Hillis incorrectly assuming that an engine had failed and decided to conduct a go-around. The captain (who was cited for failing to follow cockpit procedures at previous airlines he had flown before being hired by Flagship Airlines) failed to follow the proper procedures for a single-engine go-around. Hillis also failed to follow approved procedures for a single-engine approach, go-around, as well as proper stall recovery techniques. Flagship Airlines management was blamed for failing to identify, document, monitor, and remedy deficiencies in pilot performance and training.

== Memorial ==
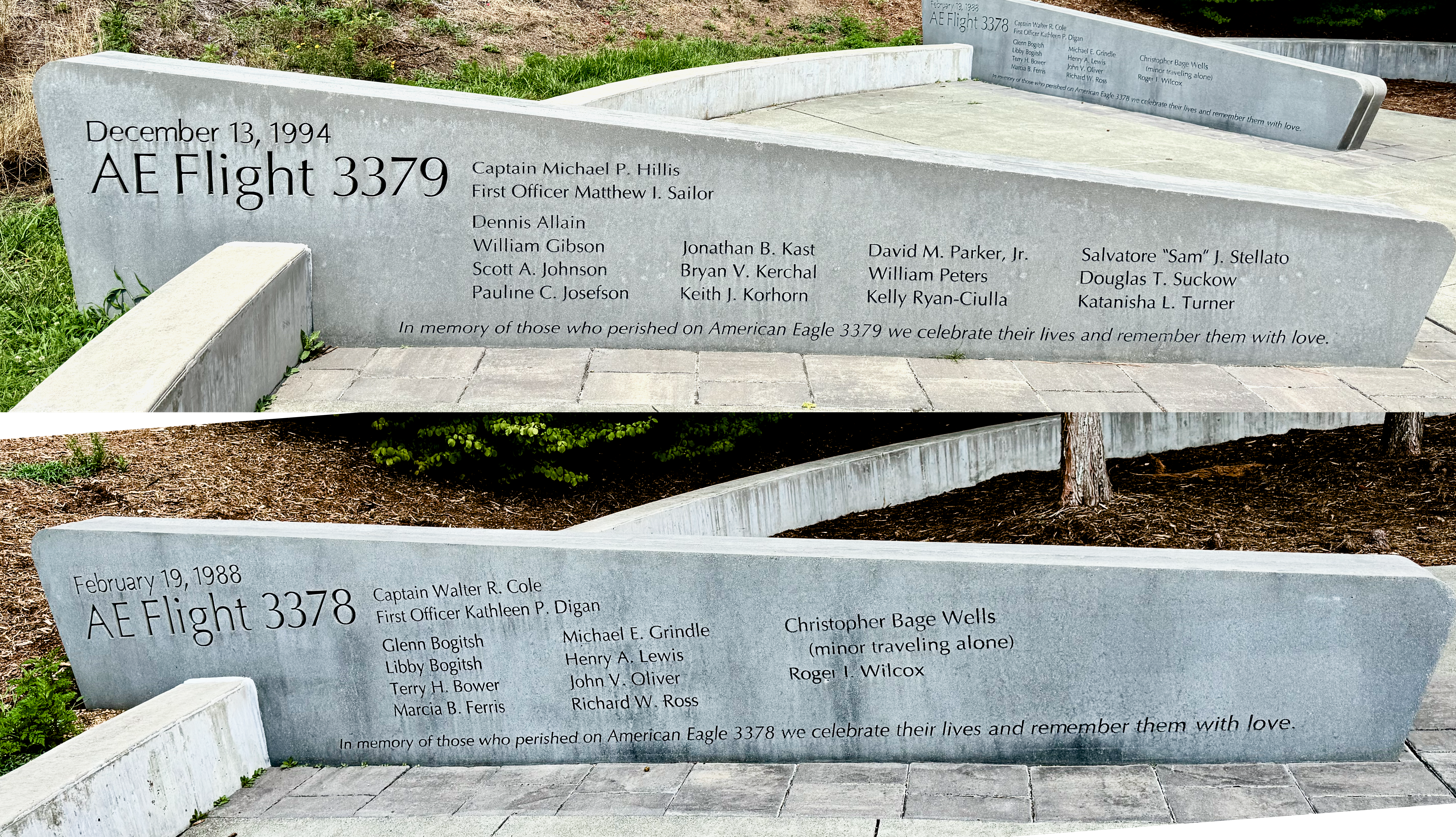

In May 2016, a memorial was dedicated at Carpenter Park in Cary, NC, USA to the passengers, crew, families, and responders of both Flight 3379 and AVAir Flight 3378, which crashed near RDU Airport in 1988.The memorial garden includes 27 shrubs representing the lives lost in both accidents, and five evergreen trees representing the five survivors of flight 3379.

== In popular culture ==
The crash was featured in the ninth episode of season 22 of the Canadian documentary series Mayday titled "Turboprop Terror".
