= Simmons Airlines =

American regional airline (1978–1998)

IATA	ICAO	Call sign
MQ	SYM	SIMMONS
- Founded: 1978; 48 years ago
- Commenced operations: 1978; 48 years ago
- Ceased operations: May 15, 1998; 28 years ago (merged with Wings West Airlines and Flagship Airlines to form American Eagle Airlines)
- Hubs: Chicago–O'Hare; Dallas/Fort Worth; Miami
- Parent company: AMR Corporation
- Headquarters: Marquette County Airport, Negaunee Township, Michigan (earlier); Near North Side, Chicago, Illinois (later)

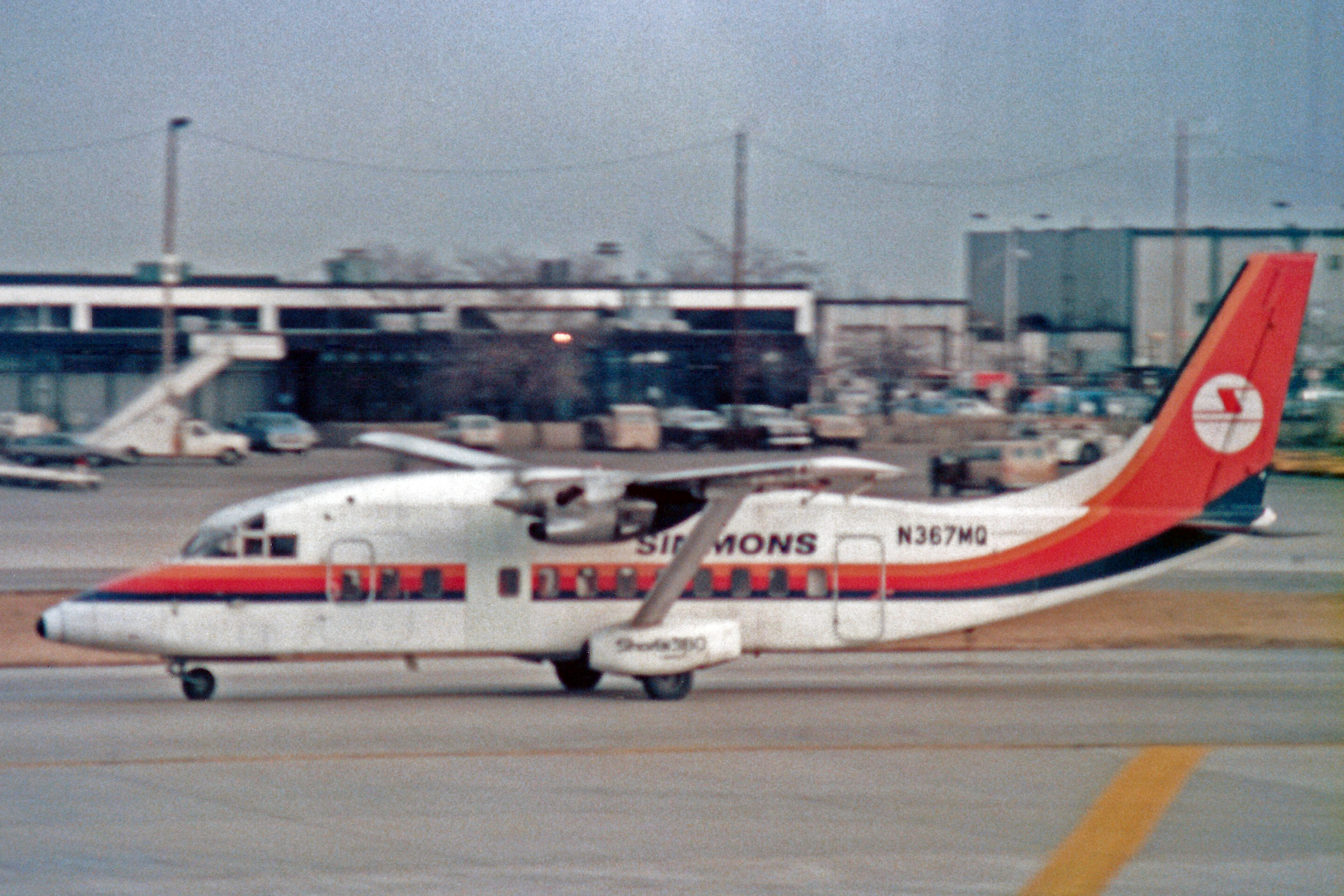
Simmons Airlines Shorts SD-360-100

Simmons Airlines was an American regional airline. It was the predecessor to American Eagle Airlines. Its headquarters were originally near Marquette, Michigan, at the Marquette County Airport in Negaunee Township, and were eventually moved to the Near North Side of Chicago, Illinois.

== History ==
Simmons Airlines, Inc. began operations in 1978 between Marquette and Lansing using a Piper Navajo. Operations expanded in the 1980s to link multiple points in Michigan to Chicago and Detroit, and its fleet expanded with Embraer EMB 110 Bandeirante, Shorts 360s, and YS-11s. It began operating as a Republic Express-branded carrier on April 28, 1985, (later Northwest Airlink) serving markets from Detroit, and as an American Eagle-branded carrier on October 1, 1985, serving markets from Chicago.

Simmons was acquired by AMR Corp. on August 8, 1988, and ended Northwest Airlink flights soon after. On May 28, 1993, it acquired certain assets of the holdings of Metro Airlines. Metro and its holdings Metro Airlines Leasing (d/b/a Metroflight), operated American Eagle flights from Dallas/Fort Worth International Airport and had recently acquired Chaparral Airlines just prior the asset acquisition by AMR Simmons.

In 1998 the remaining certificated regional airline carriers Wings West Airlines and Flagship Airlines, which were both wholly owned by the AMR Corporation and operating under the American Eagle banner and brand, were merged under the surviving Simmons Airlines IATA designator 'MQ', thus forming a certificated airline named American Eagle Airlines (rather than just an Airlink, Connect, Connection, Eagle, or Express airline codeshare brand).

== Incidents and accidents ==
- January 19, 1979: A Simmons Piper Aerostar flying from Lansing to Marquette diverted to Kent County International Airport during freezing rain on January 19, 1979. The plane crashed as the pilot attempted to land, killing the pilot and three passengers and seriously injuring two passengers.
- March 13, 1986: Simmons Airlines flight 1746, an EMB-110P1, operating as a regularly scheduled flight, departed the Detroit Metropolitan Airport en route to Sault Ste. Marie, Michigan, with a stop in Alpena, Michigan. The en route portion of the flight to Alpena was uneventful. However, due to the prevailing instrument meteorological conditions, the crew was unable to complete the instrument landing system (ILS) approach and land and they declared a missed approach at 2142. At 2153, the flight was cleared for a second ILS approach to Alpena. At 2156, the crew acknowledged that radar services were being terminated.’ This was the last transmission from the airplane. About 2215, a motorist reported that the airplane had crashed. The airplane was found in a wooded area about 300 feet (91 m) to the left of the extended centerline, and 1 1/2 miles (2.4 km) short of the threshold of runway 1 at Alpena County Regional Airport. The airplane was destroyed and two of the seven passengers and one of the two crewmembers on board were killed.
- October 31, 1994: American Eagle Flight 4184, an ATR 72 operated by Simmons Airlines, crashed near Roselawn, Indiana. The aircraft inverted, dived, and crashed from a holding pattern at 10,000 feet (3050 m) "after a ridge of ice accreted beyond the deice boots" resulting in an unexpected aileron hinge moment reversal that subsequently resulted in the loss of control. The four crew and 64 passengers were all killed. In the months following the accident, American Eagle redeployed its ATR fleet to Miami and the Caribbean where icing is not an issue. The aircraft manufacturer, ATR, has since improved the anti-ice boots.
- July 9, 1995: American Eagle Flight 4127, an ATR 72 operated by Simmons Airlines, experienced a loss of the rear cabin entry door during its climb after taking off from O'Hare International Airport in Chicago. The cabin door opened shortly after the first officer began to pressurize the cabin; therefore, only a slight pressure differential existed between the cabin pressure and the atmospheric pressure. Lack of damage indicates the door was unlocked/unlatched when it opened. The airplane was one of fifteen aircraft equipped with a new handrail and door handle design which was different than the majority of the ATR 72 fleet. The old handle was pulled down to latch/lock the door and pushed up to unlatch/unlock the door. The direction of motion was reversed so that the handle was pushed up to latch/lock the door and pulled down to unlatch/unlock the door. A private citizen located the separated door in approximately two feet of water in the Des Plaines River on July 10, 1995. Following this incident, ATR designed another new door handle design which returns the handle motion to push up to unlatch/unlock, and pull down to latch/lock.

== See also ==
- List of defunct airlines of the United States
