= Marquette County Airport =

Former airport in Negaunee, Michigan, United States

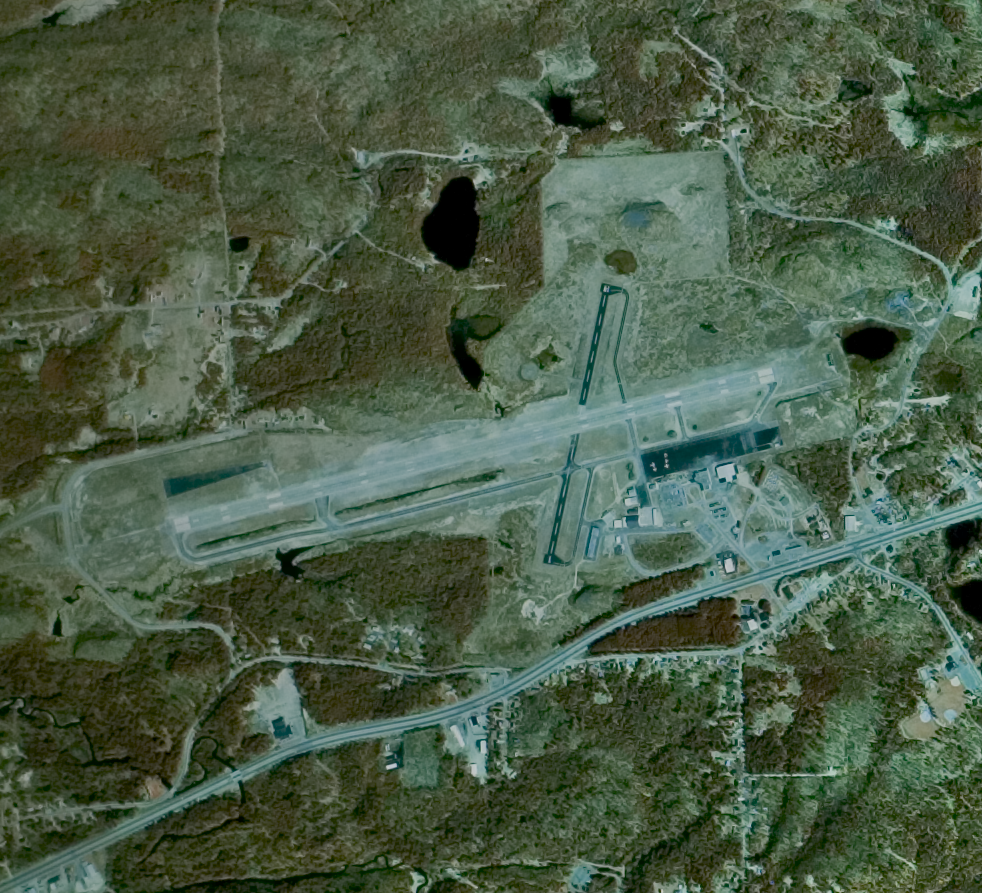
- Orthoimagery of the airport in 1999
- IATA: MQT; ICAO: KMQT; FAA LID: MQT

Summary
- Airport type: Public
- Owner: Marquette County
- Serves: Marquette, Michigan
- Location: Negaunee Township, Michigan, U.S.
- Opened: 1932
- Closed: 1999
- Elevation AMSL: 1,412 ft / 430 m
- Coordinates: 46°32′1.98″N 87°33′45.20″W

Map
- Location in the United States Location in Michigan

Runways
Direction	Length		Surface
Direction	ft	m	Surface
1/19	3,000	914	Asphalt
8/26	7,000	2,134	Asphalt

Marquette County Airport (IATA: MQT, ICAO: KMQT, FAA LID: MQT) was an airport in the Upper Peninsula of Michigan, located in Negaunee Township in Marquette County, several miles west of the city of Marquette. Following the closure of K. I. Sawyer Air Force Base in 1995, commercial air service was relocated to the newly established Sawyer International Airport (now Marquette Sawyer Regional Airport), which opened in 1999 on the former base site.

In 2006, the Keweenaw Bay Indian Community proposed moving its Ojibwa II casino from Chocolay Township to the airport site, where it would build a 135,000-square-foot (12,540 m^{2}) facility. The proposal was rejected by Governor Rick Snyder, unless a broader agreement could be reached.
