= Envoy Air =

American regional airline

Envoy Air Inc.

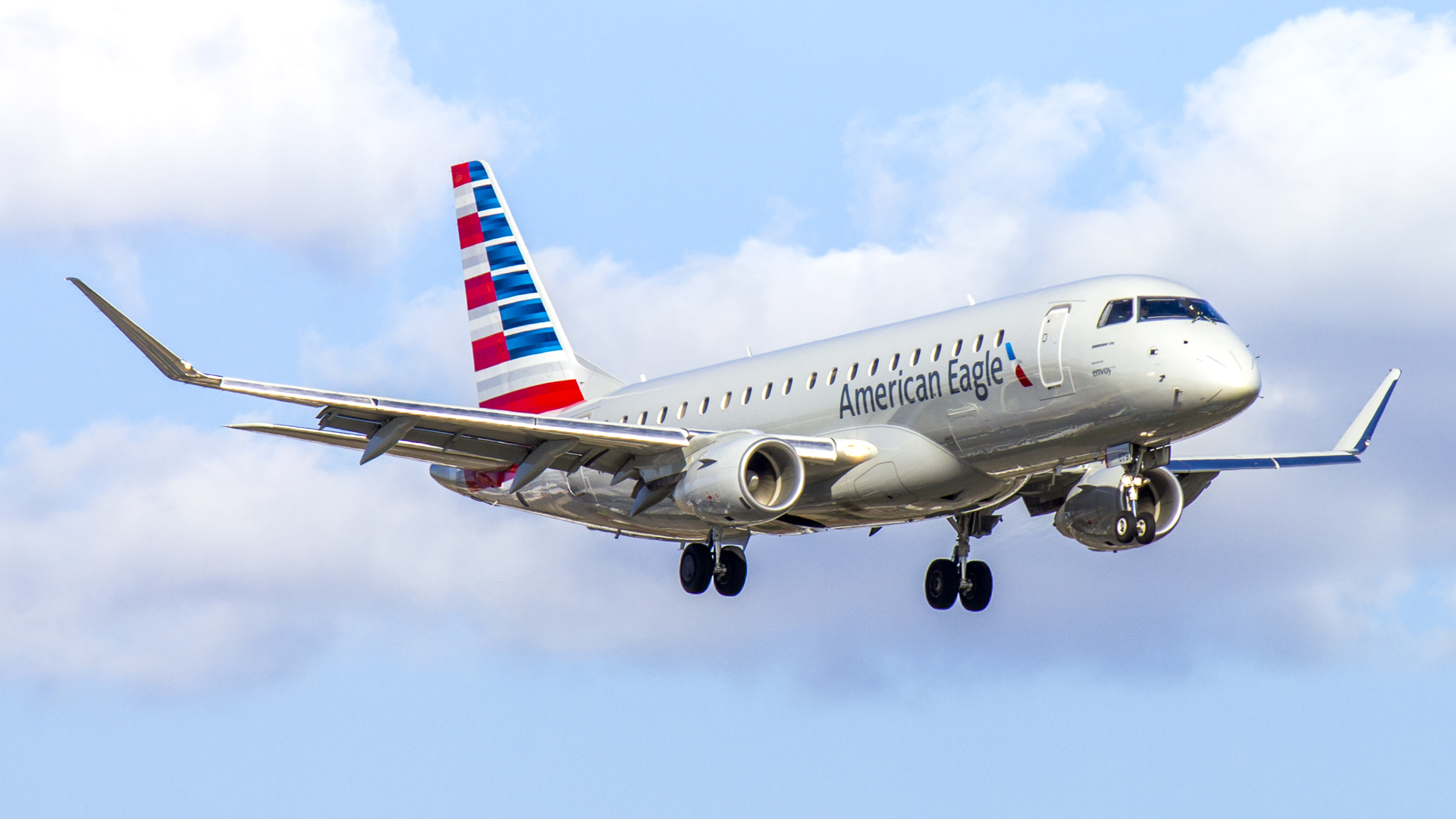
- Embraer 175 in American Eagle livery
IATA	ICAO	Call sign
MQ	ENY	ENVOY
- Founded: 1984; 42 years ago (as American Eagle Airlines)
- Commenced operations: May 15, 1998; 28 years ago
- AOC #: SIMA586A
- Hubs: Chicago–O'Hare; Dallas/Fort Worth; Miami; Phoenix–Sky Harbor
- Frequent-flyer program: AAdvantage
- Alliance: Oneworld (affiliate)
- Fleet size: 179
- Destinations: 170
- Parent company: American Airlines Group
- Headquarters: Irving, Texas, U.S.
- Key people: Pedro Fábregas (President & CEO); Robert Isom (American Airlines Group CEO)
- Employees: 20,000 (2024)
- Website: www.envoyair.com

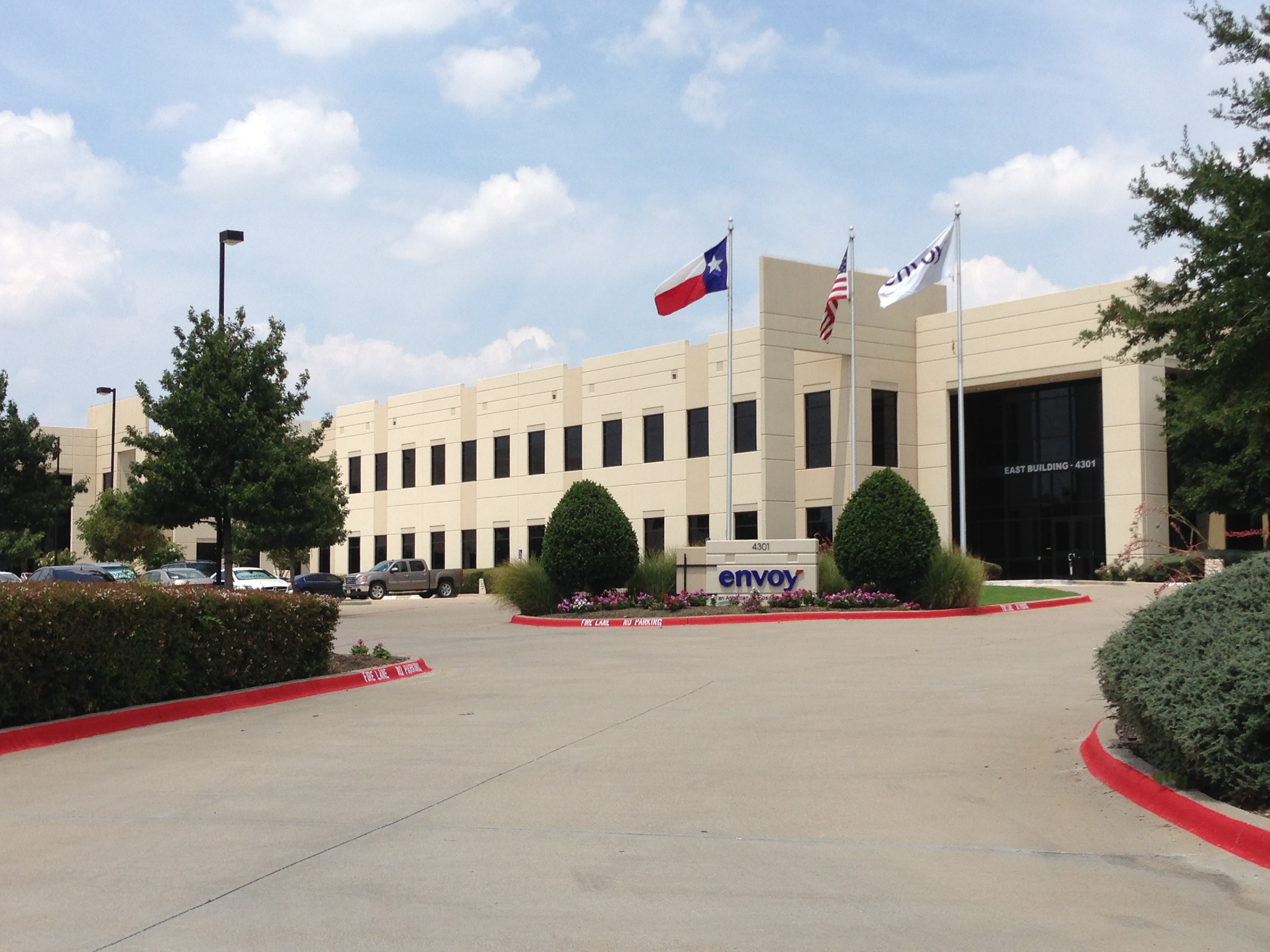
The headquarters for Envoy Air located at 4301 Regent Blvd. in Irving, Texas (2014)

Envoy Air Inc. is an American regional airline headquartered in Irving, Texas, in the Dallas–Fort Worth metroplex. It is a wholly owned subsidiary of the American Airlines Group and it is paid by fellow group member American Airlines to staff, operate and maintain aircraft used on American Eagle flights that are scheduled, marketed and sold by American Airlines.

Envoy Air operates a fleet consisting of exclusively Embraer regional jet aircraft. The company has a team of more than 18,000 employees, operating more than 1,000 daily flights to over 150 destinations in the United States, Canada, Mexico, Caribbean and South America.

Envoy was formerly known as American Eagle Airlines and was formed when American's parent company merged several airlines owned by the group and operating regional flights. The name was changed to avoid confusion with other regional carriers that operate on behalf of American Eagle. The name "American Eagle Airlines" was also used between April 1980 and April 1981 by an unrelated air charter service that suspended operations and filed bankruptcy before flying any scheduled operations.

== History ==
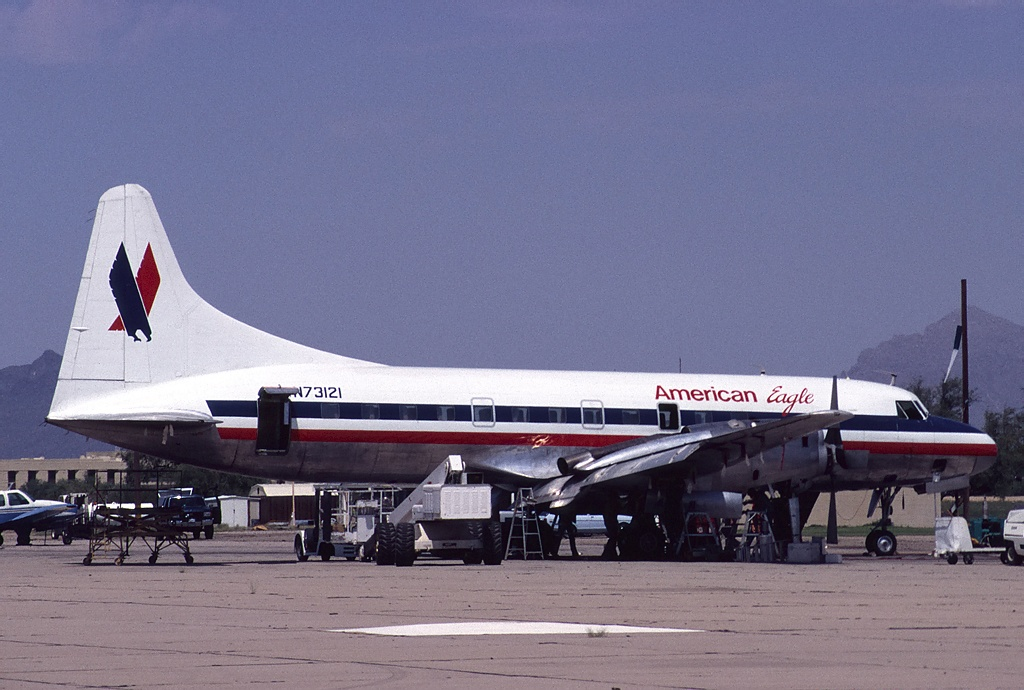
A Convair 580 operated by American Eagle in the Caribbeans

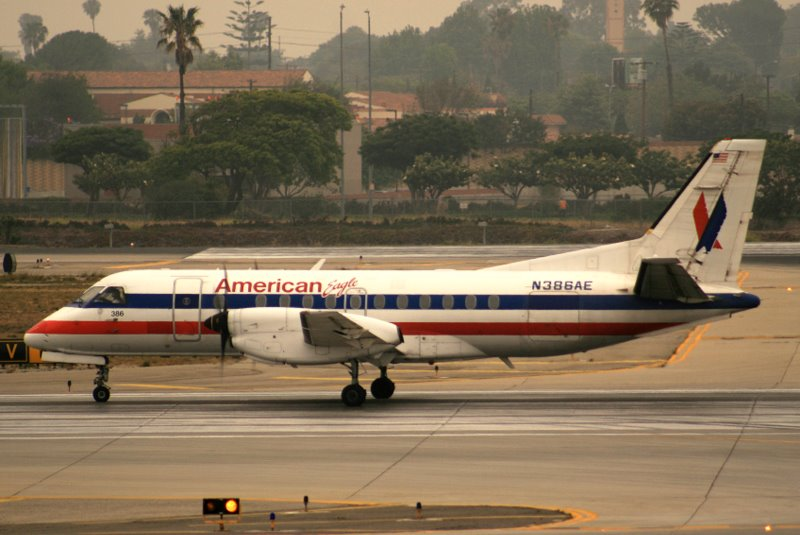
A Saab 340BPlus at Los Angeles International Airport (2007)

Envoy began as a collection of regional carriers with contracts to carry the American Eagle brand name. The first American Eagle flight was operated by Metroflight Airlines, which was a wholly owned subsidiary of Metro Airlines (formerly Houston Metro Airlines), on 1 November 1984, from Fayetteville, Arkansas, and Fort Smith, Arkansas, to Dallas/Fort Worth International Airport. Metroflight utilized Convair 580 turboprop aircraft that had been formerly operated by Frontier Airlines.

Other carriers that have flown in American Eagle livery include Executive Airlines, Command Airways, Air Virginia, Simmons Airlines, Chaparral Airlines and Wings West Airlines. Among other aircraft in its fleet, Chaparral flew Grumman I-C turboprops which were stretched, 37 passenger regional airliner versions of Grumman's successful propjet business aircraft and was one of only a few air carriers to ever operate the type in scheduled passenger service.

Until 1987 these third-party carriers flew under contract with American Airlines to provide regional feed to its hubs. During 1987 and 1988 AMR Corp. acquired its regional carriers, starting with Simmons Airlines. AMR's final airline d.b.a. American Eagle acquisition was Executive Airlines in 1989.

By mid-1991 AMR had consolidated the number of carriers to four. The May 15, 1998, merger of Wings West and Flagship into Simmons (and the name change of Simmons Airlines to American Eagle Airlines) reduced the number of carriers flying as American Eagle under separate operating certificates to two: American Eagle Airlines and Executive Airlines.

American Eagle Airlines launched its regional jet service in May 1998 using Embraer ERJ 145 aircraft.

AMR struck a codesharing deal with Trans World Airlines (TWA), allowing TWA to sell American Eagle Airlines flights feeding into Los Angeles and later New York's JFK Airports. These services were branded by TWA as Trans World Connection flights. These American Eagle Airlines/Trans World agreements were forged well in advance of AMR's acquisition of TWA in 2001.

During 2007, AMR began studying ways to spin American Eagle Airlines off into a separate company, including, but not limited to, the possibility of selling the company to stockholders or an unaffiliated third party. In 2008, AMR said any plans had been put on hold until the airline industry stabilized after the 2008 financial crisis. In July 2011, AMR announced the spin-off of American Eagle Airlines, but those plans were again shelved when AMR filed for bankruptcy in November 2011.

On 14 January 2014, American Airlines Group officially announced the rebranding of its American Eagle subsidiary as Envoy. Aircraft operated by American Eagle continued to operate under the current American Eagle branding, but an "Operated by Envoy Air" label was added, similar to the label used by other contract airlines that fly aircraft with American Eagle livery. This name change was created to avoid confusion when American Airlines announced that other regional carriers would operate on behalf of American. The term 'Envoy' is a reincarnation of the now deprecated Envoy Class of seating on US Airways aircraft.

American Eagle carriers
Carrier	Eagle service began	Acquired by AMR	Eagle service ended	Notes
Metroflight Airlines (formerly Metro Airlines)	November 1, 1984	May 28, 1993	May 28, 1993	Bankrupt; assets acquired by Simmons Airlines
AVAir (formerly Air Virginia)	May 15, 1985	May 1988	May 1988	Bankrupt; assets acquired by Nashville Eagle
Simmons Airlines	October 1, 1985	August 1, 1987	May 15, 1998	Merged with Flagship and Wings West to form American Eagle Airlines
Command Airways	April 27, 1986	September 28, 1988	June 1, 1991	Merged into Nashville Eagle to form Flagship Airlines
Wings West	June 1986	August 9, 1987	May 15, 1998	Merged into Simmons to form American Eagle Airlines, Inc.
Executive Airlines	November 1, 1986	1990	March 31, 2013	San Juan (SJU) American Eagle hub shut down with ATR-72 turboprop aircraft phased out of fleet
Nashville Eagle	January 1988	January 1988	June 1, 1991	AMR Corp.’s first and only start-up airline, using equipment acquired from Air Midwest. Merged with Command Airways to form Flagship Airlines<
Flagship Airlines	June 1, 1991	June 1, 1991	May 15, 1998	Formed by the merger of Command Airways into Nashville Eagle; merged into Simmons to form American Eagle Airlines, Inc.
American Eagle Airlines	May 15, 1998	May 15, 1998	Apr 15, 2014	Formed by the merger of Wings West and Flagship into Simmons
Envoy Air	Apr 15, 2014	May 15, 1998	Still Operating	American Eagle Airlines rebranded to Envoy
Business Express Airlines	—	March 1999	—	Never flew under the American Eagle brand before being fully integrated into American Eagle Airlines, Inc. in December 2000.

Envoy merger tree

AVAir	Metroflight Airlines
Command Airways	Nashville Eagle
Flagship Airlines	Simmons Airlines	Wings West Airlines
Business Express Airlines	American Eagle Airlines	Executive Airlines
Envoy

== Corporate affairs ==
Envoy Air's headquarters are in Irving, Texas, in two buildings located north of the northeast portion of DFW Airport. American Eagle was previously headquartered at the American Airlines headquarters in Fort Worth, Texas, and had employees in several buildings: HDQ1, HDQ2, the Systems Operations Control (SOC) center, the DFW American Eagle hangar, the DFW-area warehouse CP-28, the Flight Academy, and the Flagship University. It was scheduled to consolidate operations and move 600 employees from the headquarters, SOC, and training divisions into the Irving offices in July 2014, which were formerly occupied by Epsilon.

== Crew bases ==
- Chicago, Illinois – (O'Hare International Airport)
- Dallas/Fort Worth, Texas – (Dallas/Fort Worth International Airport)
- Miami, Florida – (Miami International Airport)
- Phoenix, Arizona – (Phoenix Sky Harbor International Airport)

Future base (Announced in May 2026, opening date to be determined):

- Washington, D.C. – (Ronald Reagan Washington National Airport)

There were previously bases in Boston, Los Angeles, Nashville, New York, Raleigh/Durham, and San Juan.

== Fleet ==
As of August 2025, Envoy Air operates the following aircraft:

Envoy is expected to grow their total fleet to 214 aircraft by the end of 2027.

Aircraft	In service	Orders	Passengers				Notes
Aircraft	In service	Orders	F	Y+	Y	Total	Notes
Embraer 170	43	—	12	20	33	65	Equipped with 66 seats, one in main cabin blocked
Embraer 175	136	35	12	20	44	76	
Total	179	35					

In September 2009, AMR Corporation announced plans to add a First Class cabin to its fleet of 25 Bombardier CRJ700 regional jets and also signed a letter of intent with Bombardier, Inc. to exercise options for the purchase of 22 additional CRJ700 aircraft for delivery beginning in the middle of 2010.

In January 2014, American Eagle's pilots' union reached an agreement with the regional carrier's management that guaranteed 60 of the 90 new Embraer 175 aircraft that American Airlines ordered in December were to be operated by Eagle. The deal included options for 90 other aircraft to be operated by the regional carrier. Delivery of the aircraft would begin in the first quarter of 2015. This deal was voted down by the pilots' union, the Air Line Pilots Association (ALPA).

Envoy was awarded 40 new Embraer 175 aircraft with 90 options. Deliveries began on November 13, 2015.

In October 2016, Envoy announced that they had taken delivery of two additional Embraer 175 aircraft.

In May 2018, Envoy announced that they had taken delivery of fifteen additional Embraer 175 aircraft between March and November 2019 bringing the total of E175's to 69 by the end of 2019.

In November 2018, Envoy announced that they had taken delivery of an additional fifteen Embraer 175 aircraft totaling 84 by mid-2020.

In December 2019, Envoy transferred all of the remaining Bombardier CRJ700 aircraft to PSA Airlines.

In March 2020, it was announced that all twenty of the Embraer 175 aircraft operated by Compass Airlines would be transferred to Envoy upon their closure in April 2020.

In February 2021, American Airlines announced that the remaining ERJ140 fleet belonging to Envoy would end service on May 5, 2021.

On March 1, 2021, Envoy ordered six Embraer 170 jets, expected to enter the fleet in 2021.

On June 20, 2023, at the Paris Air Show, the American Airlines Group ordered seven Embraer 175 jets, on behalf of Envoy Air.

On June 9, 2025, Envoy announced the further awarding of 33 additional E175s to be delivered in 2026 and 2027.

=== Historical turboprop fleet ===
The American Eagle brand operated a variety of twin turboprop aircraft over the years via its various regional and commuter airline partners, including the ATR 42 and ATR 72; Beechcraft Model 99; British Aerospace Jetstream 31 and 32 models; CASA C-212 Aviocar; Convair 580; Fairchild Swearingen Metroliner; Grumman Gulfstream I (stretched G-IC model); NAMC YS-11; Short 330 and Short 360; and the Saab 340.

== Incidents and accidents ==
- January 2006: American Eagle Flight 3008 from San Luis Obispo to Los Angeles, a Saab 340B+ operated by American Eagle Airlines, encountered icing at 11,000 feet and regained control only at 6,500 feet, after some 50 seconds' descent. During the incident, in which no one was injured, the autopilot disconnected, the stall alarm/clacker sounded, and the plane rolled sharply left and right, experienced vibration, and pitched down. Manual deice boots were activated and ice could be heard shedding off and striking the fuselage. After this incident, the National Transportation Safety Board (NTSB) issued a safety recommendation which referenced other Saab 340 icing incidents, including the American Eagle Flight 4184 accident.
- On November 11, 2019, American Eagle Flight 4125 slid off the taxiway at Chicago O’Hare Airport after landing on runway 10L in icy conditions. The Embraer 145LR was taken out of the snow later. None of the 41 occupants were injured.
- On October 24, 2020, an American Eagle ERJ-145LR (N674RJ) operating as Envoy Air Flight 4194 from Miami to Freeport, Bahamas had a runway excursion upon landing. Nobody was injured in the crash. The aircraft had suffered main gear damage and the left main broke off.
- On December 31, 2022, a baggage handler employed by Piedmont Airlines, an American Airlines regional carrier, was killed on the ramp at Montgomery Regional Airport when sucked into the jet engine of an Envoy Embraer 175 which was scheduled to fly as American Airlines Flight 3408.

== See also ==
- AAdvantage
- American Eagle (airline brand)
- Aviation in the United States
