= American Eagle (airline brand) =

Regional airline brand of the US

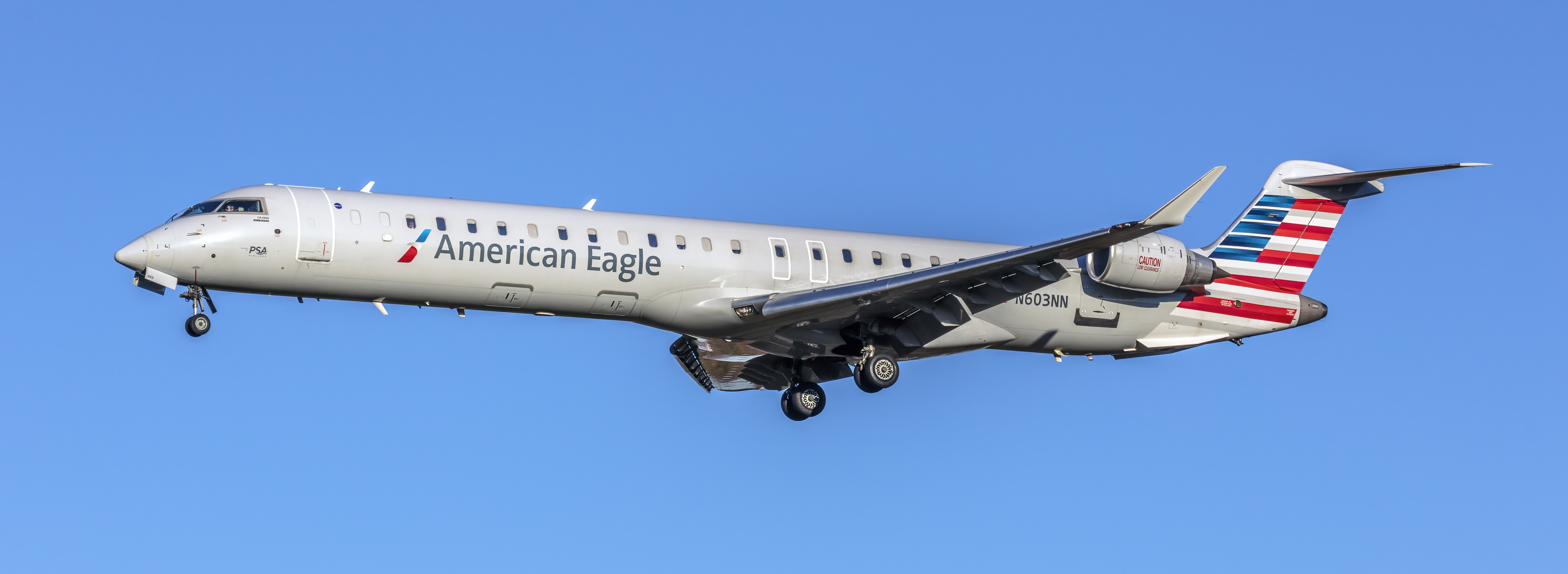
- American Eagle Bombardier CRJ-900 operated by PSA Airlines
- Founded: 1984; 42 years ago in Fort Worth, Texas; 1998; 28 years ago (second incarnation from Simmons Airlines)
- Hubs: Charlotte; Chicago–O'Hare; Dallas/Fort Worth; Los Angeles; Miami; New York–JFK; New York–LaGuardia; Philadelphia; Phoenix–Sky Harbor; Washington–National
- Frequent-flyer program: AAdvantage
- Alliance: Oneworld (affiliate)
- Fleet size: 577
- Parent company: American Airlines Group
- Headquarters: Skyview, Fort Worth, Texas, United States
- Key people: Derek Kerr (president)
- Website: www.aa.com

American Eagle is the brand for regional airline flights operated for American Airlines, encompassing flights by wholly owned affiliates Envoy Air, PSA Airlines, and Piedmont Airlines, as well as third-party carriers Republic Airways and SkyWest Airlines. These regional carriers serve smaller markets, facilitating connections to American Airlines hubs, and supporting operations in mainline markets. All American Eagle carriers share similar logos, uniforms, and aircraft paint schemes as American Airlines’ mainline operations. In 2023, 46 million passengers flew on American Eagle regional flights, with about 45% connecting to or from mainline flights. These flights operate under capacity purchase agreements with both third-party and wholly owned regional carriers, controlling all aspects of marketing, scheduling, ticketing, pricing, and seat inventories. American Airlines pays fixed fees for operating specified aircraft and covering certain variable costs, such as fuel, landing fees, and insurance.

== Airlines and fleet ==
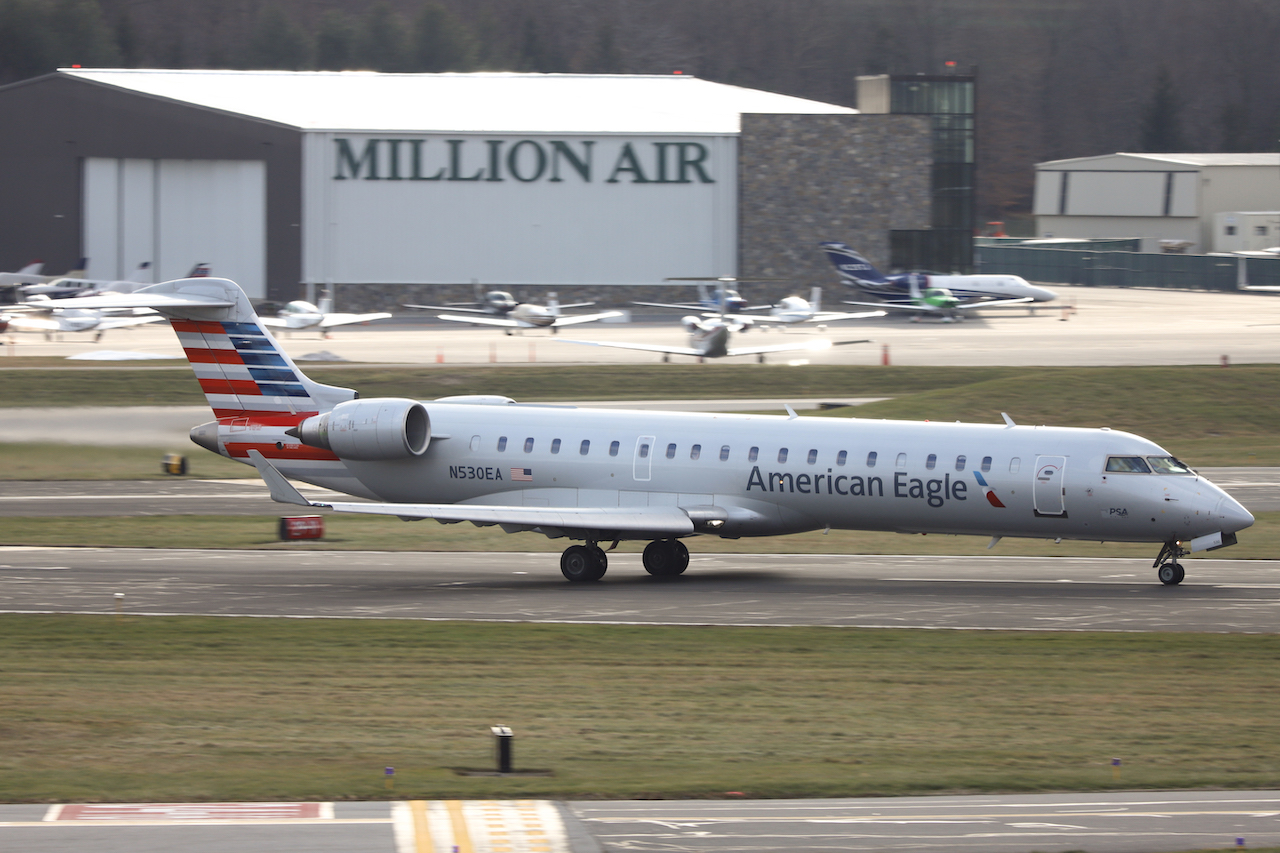
Bombardier CRJ700

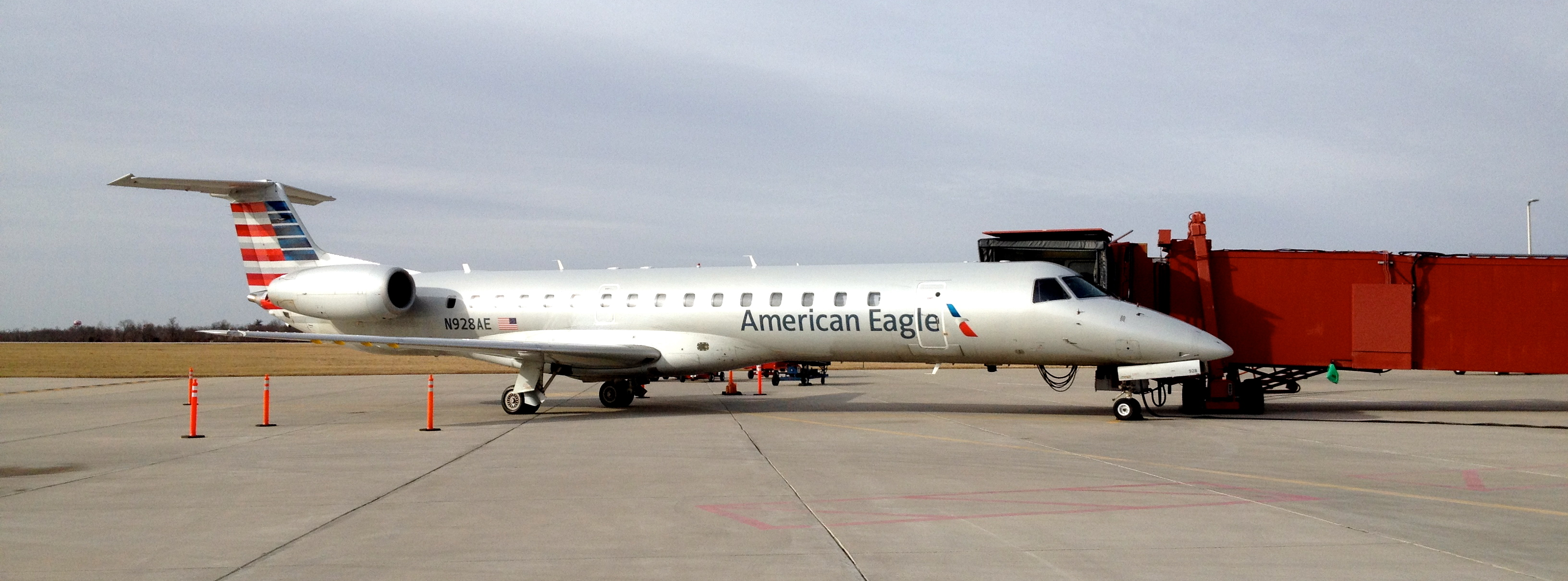
Embraer ERJ 145

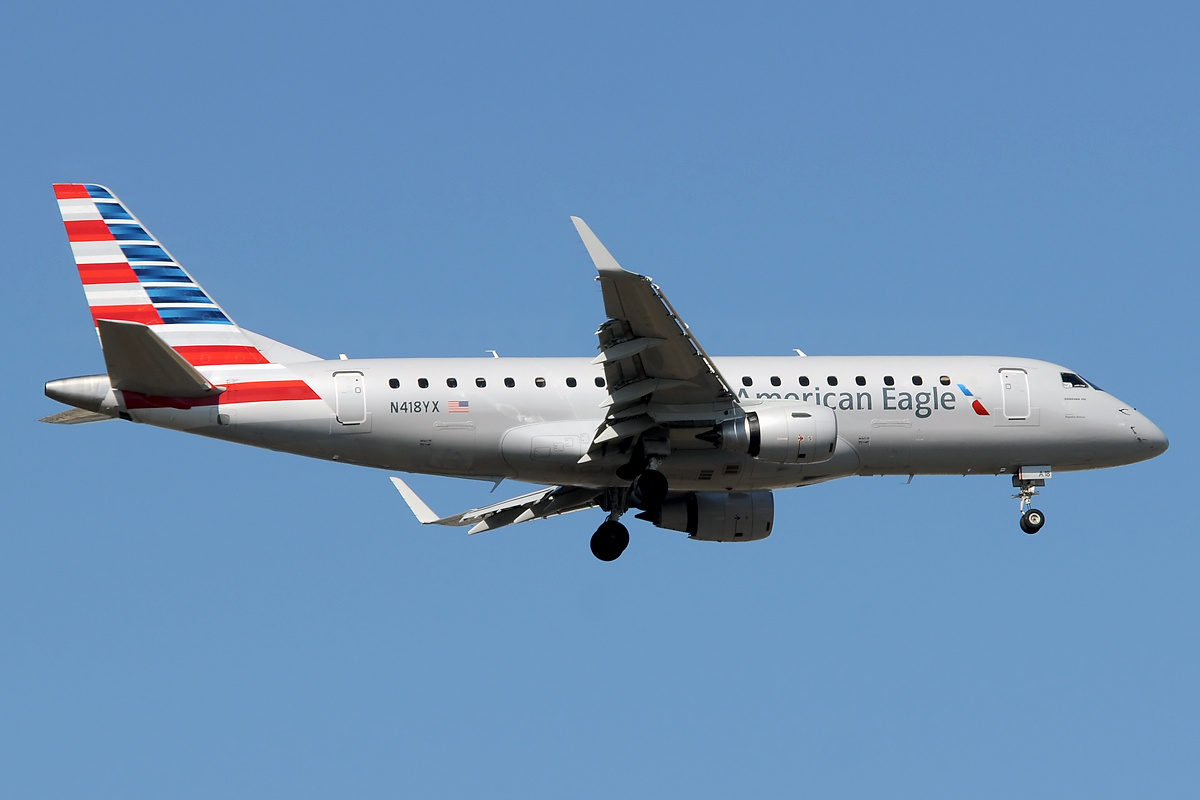
Embraer 175

As of January 2025, the combined American Eagle-branded fleet consists of the following regional jet aircraft:

Airline	Aircraft	In fleet	Orders	Passengers				Notes
Airline	Aircraft	In fleet	Orders	F	Y+	Y	Total	Notes
American Airlines Group subsidiaries
Envoy Air	Embraer 170	43	36	12	20	34	65	One seat blocked. Orders are for used aircraft.
Envoy Air	Embraer 175	124	33	12	20	44	76	
Piedmont Airlines	Embraer ERJ 145	67	—	—	3	47	50	
Piedmont Airlines	Embraer 175	—	45	12	20	44	76	
PSA Airlines	Bombardier CRJ700	60	—	9	12	44	65	One crashed in American Eagle Flight 5342 on January 29, 2025.
PSA Airlines	Bombardier CRJ900	94	—	12	24	40	76	One seat blocked on 35 aircraft.
Third-party contractors
Republic Airways	Embraer 170	13	—	12	20	34	65	One seat blocked. To be transferred to Envoy Air.
Republic Airways	Embraer 175	76	—	12	20	44	76	
SkyWest Airlines	Bombardier CRJ700	71	—	9	16	40	65	
SkyWest Airlines	Bombardier CRJ900	9	—	12	24	40	76	
SkyWest Airlines	Embraer 175	20	—	12	20	44	76	
Total		577	114					

In addition to the orders listed above, American Airlines also placed an order for 90 Embraer 175 aircraft back in 2024. Envoy announced it was to receive 33 of those shortly after. In June of 2025, it was announced that Piedmont Airlines was to take half of that order and acquire 45 units of the type. This is a new aircraft to operate for the airline.

== History ==
Former logo

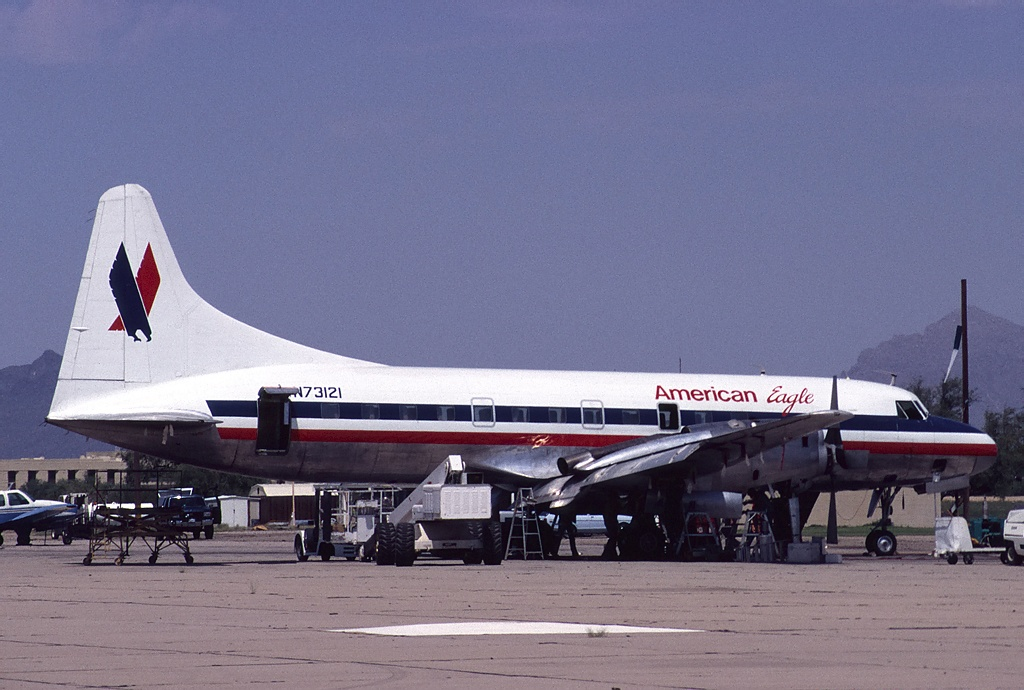
A Convair 580, similar to the one operating the inaugural American Eagle flight

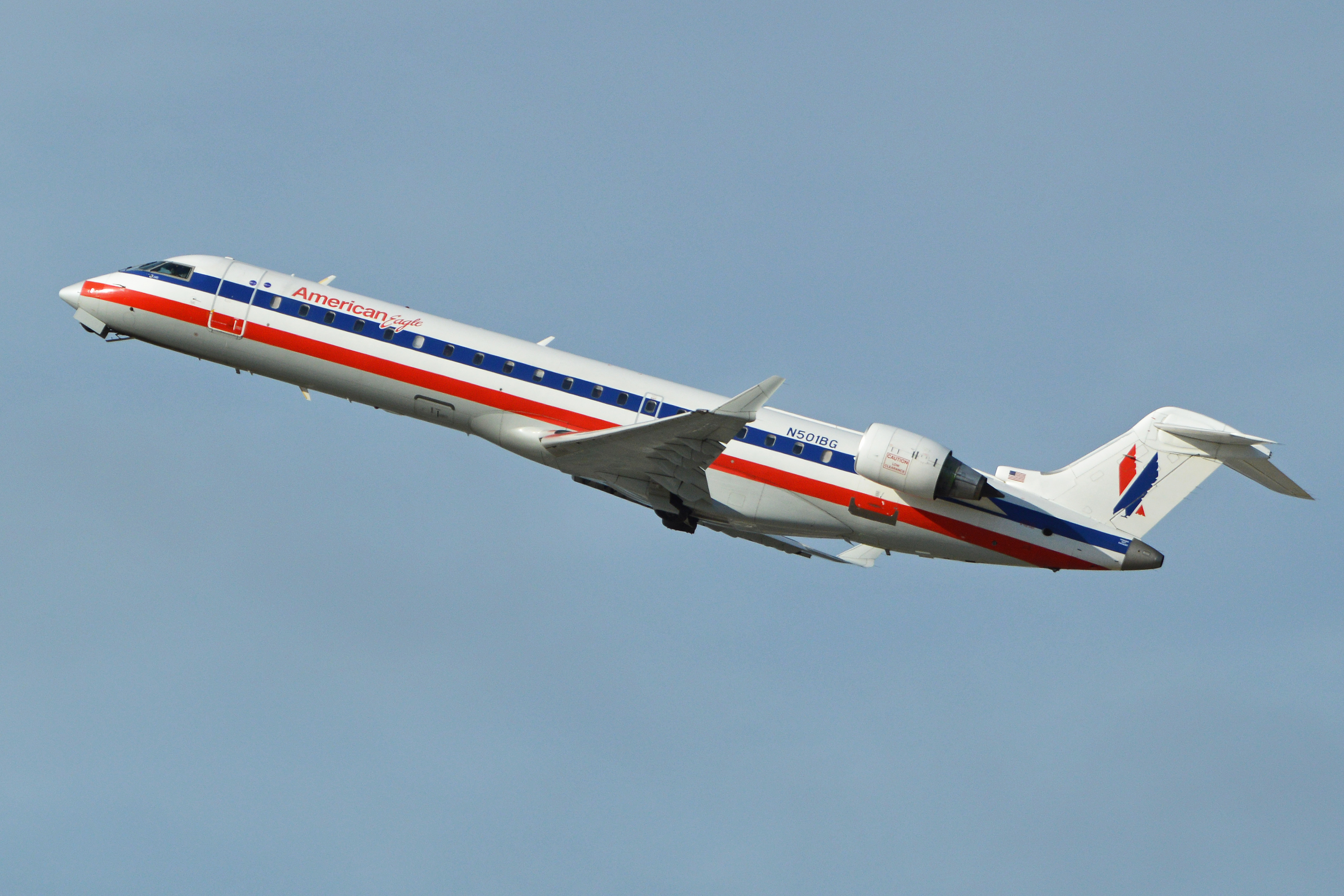
American Eagle Bombardier CRJ700 in the airline's previous livery

Before the Airline Deregulation Act in 1978, most major US air carriers maintained close relationships with independent regional carriers to feed passengers from smaller markets into larger cities, and, in turn, onto larger legacy carriers. In the post-regulation era, the hub-and-spoke system gained prominence, and to feed traffic from smaller markets to these newly established hubs, the major carriers outsourced regional operations to these smaller carriers. These relationships included the use of code sharing, shared branding, and listing regional partners in the computer reservations systems of the mainline carrier.

American Eagle commenced service on November 1, 1984, when Metroflight Airlines (a wholly owned subsidiary of Metro Airlines) became the first operator to join the network. The first American Eagle-branded flight was operated by Metro that day from Fayetteville, Arkansas, to Dallas/Fort Worth International Airport (DFW), using a Convair 580 turboprop aircraft. Metroflight also operated de Havilland Canada DHC-6 commuter turboprop aircraft on American Eagle flights serving DFW. Chaparral Airlines was the second operator to join the network, beginning American Eagle flights on December 1, 1984. Other operators later contracted by American Airlines to fly the American Eagle banner during this time included Air Midwest, Air Virginia (later AVAir), Command Airways, Simmons Airlines, and Wings West.

On September 15, 1986, Executive Airlines joined the American Eagle system. With hub operations at Luis Muñoz Marín International Airport in San Juan, Puerto Rico, the addition of Executive Airways to the American Eagle family opened an extensive inter-island network throughout the Caribbean.

Between 1987 and 1989, AMR Corp. (parent corporation of American Airlines) gradually acquired most of its regional carriers, starting with Simmons Airlines. By 1991, AMR had consolidated its wholly owned regional carriers into four entities: Executive Airlines, Flagship Airlines, Simmons Airlines, and Wings West. AMR would later purchase the assets of bankrupt Metro Airlines in 1993. At this point, AMR owned all of the airlines that were operating for American Eagle.

On May 15, 1998, Flagship Airlines and Wings West merged into Simmons Airlines, with the new entity named American Eagle Airlines. Along with Executive Airlines, these would be the only operators using the American Eagle brand name for the next fourteen years.

After American Airlines acquired Trans World Airlines (TWA) in 2001, it retained contracts with the carriers that operated under the Trans World Express banner, which included Chautauqua Airlines, Corporate Airlines, and Trans States Airlines. However, instead of being integrated into the American Eagle brand, these carriers operated under a separate regional brand known as AmericanConnection. This brand name was used for thirteen years before being discontinued in 2014.

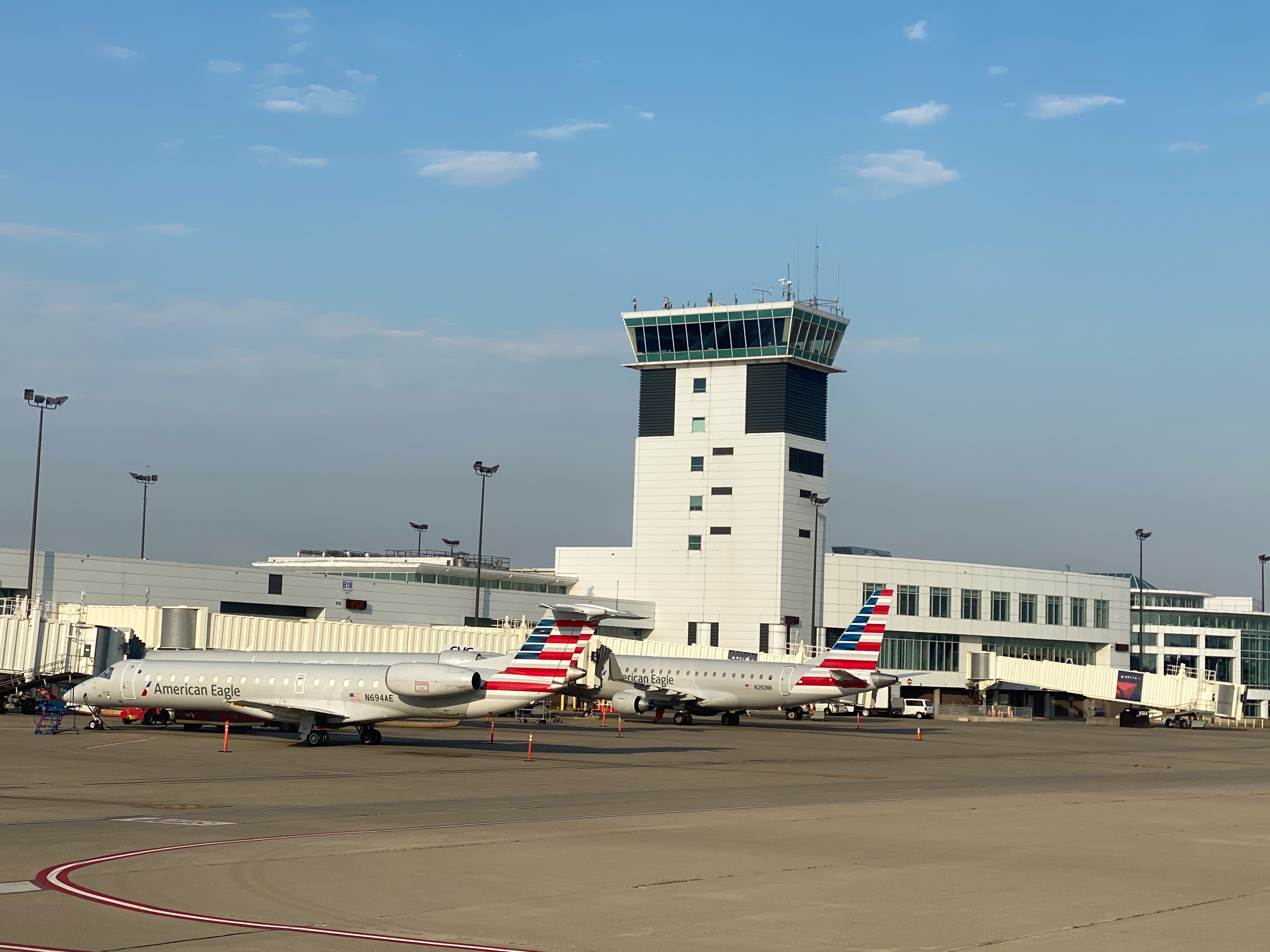
American Eagle aircraft parked at Cincinnati/Northern Kentucky International Airport in June 2020.

=== 2010s developments ===
As part of its restructuring and emergence from chapter 11 bankruptcy, AMR announced it would contract American Eagle flying to carriers outside its wholly owned subsidiaries. On November 15, 2012, SkyWest Airlines and ExpressJet Airlines—both subsidiaries of SkyWest, Inc.—began operations for American Eagle. On August 1, 2013, Republic Airways, a subsidiary of Republic Airways Holdings, commenced flying operations under the American Eagle branding as part of a 12-year capacity purchase agreement to operate Embraer 175 aircraft for American Eagle.

On September 12, 2012, AMR announced the discontinuation of the AmericanConnection brand, and the integration of all operations into the American Eagle brand. However, Chautauqua Airlines, a subsidiary of Republic Airways Holdings, and the only operator of AmericanConnection flights at the time of the announcement, opted not to renew its contract. All AmericanConnection flights ended on August 19, 2014.

American Eagle service operated by Executive Airlines ceased operations on March 31, 2013. At the same time, its base at San Juan was dehubbed.

Because an increasing number of other carriers were contracting to fly under the American Eagle brand, it was announced on January 15, 2014, that American Eagle Airlines would change its name to Envoy Air effective on April 15, 2014.

Compass Airlines, a subsidiary of Trans States Holdings, began American Eagle operations on March 27, 2015, as part of a deal to operate 20 new Embraer 175 aircraft on behalf of American. These aircraft were based at American's Los Angeles hub. Compass ceased operations after April 5, 2020, as a result of the COVID-19 pandemic reducing demand.

Air Wisconsin had announced it would exclusively fly as United Express which commenced in March 2018, ending its involvement in operating flights under the American Eagle brand.

In May 2018, American Airlines announced the termination of its partnerships with ExpressJet and Trans States Airlines as of 2019, meaning the end of those operators conducting American Eagle flights.

In September 2020, Envoy Air, a subsidiary of American Eagle, announced a permanent closure at its two New York City bases at LaGuardia Airport and John F. Kennedy International Airport, due to a new codeshare agreement between American Airlines and JetBlue.

On January 10, 2025, Air Wisconsin announced it was terminating CRJ-200 operations for American Eagle to pursue its own Essential Air Service operations. It is anticipated that American and Air Wisconsin will continue an interline and codeshare relationship with American.

=== Former operators ===
Airline	Years of operation	Notes
Air Midwest	1985–1988	Assets acquired by AMR and integrated into Nashville Eagle.
Air Wisconsin	2005–2018; 2023–2025	Transitioned to exclusively flying charter and Essential Air Service subsidized flights.
American Eagle Airlines	1998–2014	Rebranded as Envoy Air.
AVAir (formerly Air Virginia)	1985–1988	Declared Bankruptcy; Assets acquired by AMR and integrated into Nashville Eagle.
Chaparral Airlines	1984–1990	Acquired by AMR in 1992. Merged with Metroflight Airlines.
Command Airways	1986–1991	Acquired by AMR in 1988. Merged with Nashville Eagle to form Flagship Airlines.
Compass Airlines	2015–2020	Ceased operations in April 2020. Assets transferred to Envoy Air.
Executive Airlines	1986–2013	Acquired by AMR in 1989.
ExpressJet	2013–2018	Transferred exclusively to United Express.
Flagship Airlines	1991–1998	Merged with Simmons Airlines and Wings West Airlines to form American Eagle Airlines.
Mesa Airlines	2014–2023	Transferred exclusively to United Express.
Metroflight Airlines, a division of Metro Airlines	1984–1993	Declared Bankruptcy: Assets acquired by AMR and integrated into Simmons Airlines.
Nashville Eagle	1988–1991	Merged with Command Airways to form Flagship Airlines.
Simmons Airlines	1985–1998	Acquired by AMR in 1987. Merged with Flagship Airlines and Wings West Airlines to form American Eagle Airlines.
Trans States Airlines	1985–2018	Originally flew as Trans World Express. Transferred exclusively to United Express.
Wings West Airlines	1986–1998	Acquired by AMR in 1987. Merged with Flagship Airlines and Simmons Airlines to form American Eagle Airlines.

• In January 1988, Nashville Eagle became AMR Corp.’s first and only start-up airline, using equipment acquired from Air Midwest.
• Business Express was acquired by AMR Eagle Holdings Corporation in March 1999, although it never flew under the American Eagle brand before being fully integrated into American Eagle Airlines, Inc. in December 2000.

=== Historical regional jet fleet ===
The American Eagle brand, through its various regional and commuter airline partners, operated a variety of twinjet aircraft over the years including the following types:

Aircraft	Total	Introduced	Retired	Replacement	Notes
Bombardier CRJ200	142	2012	2025	Bombardier CRJ900 and Embraer 175	Operated by PSA Airlines, Air Wisconsin, SkyWest Airlines, and ExpressJet
Embraer ERJ 135	40	1999	2019	Embraer ERJ 145	Operated by American Eagle
Embraer ERJ 140	59	2014	2021	Embraer ERJ 145	Operated by Envoy Air

=== Historical turboprop fleet ===
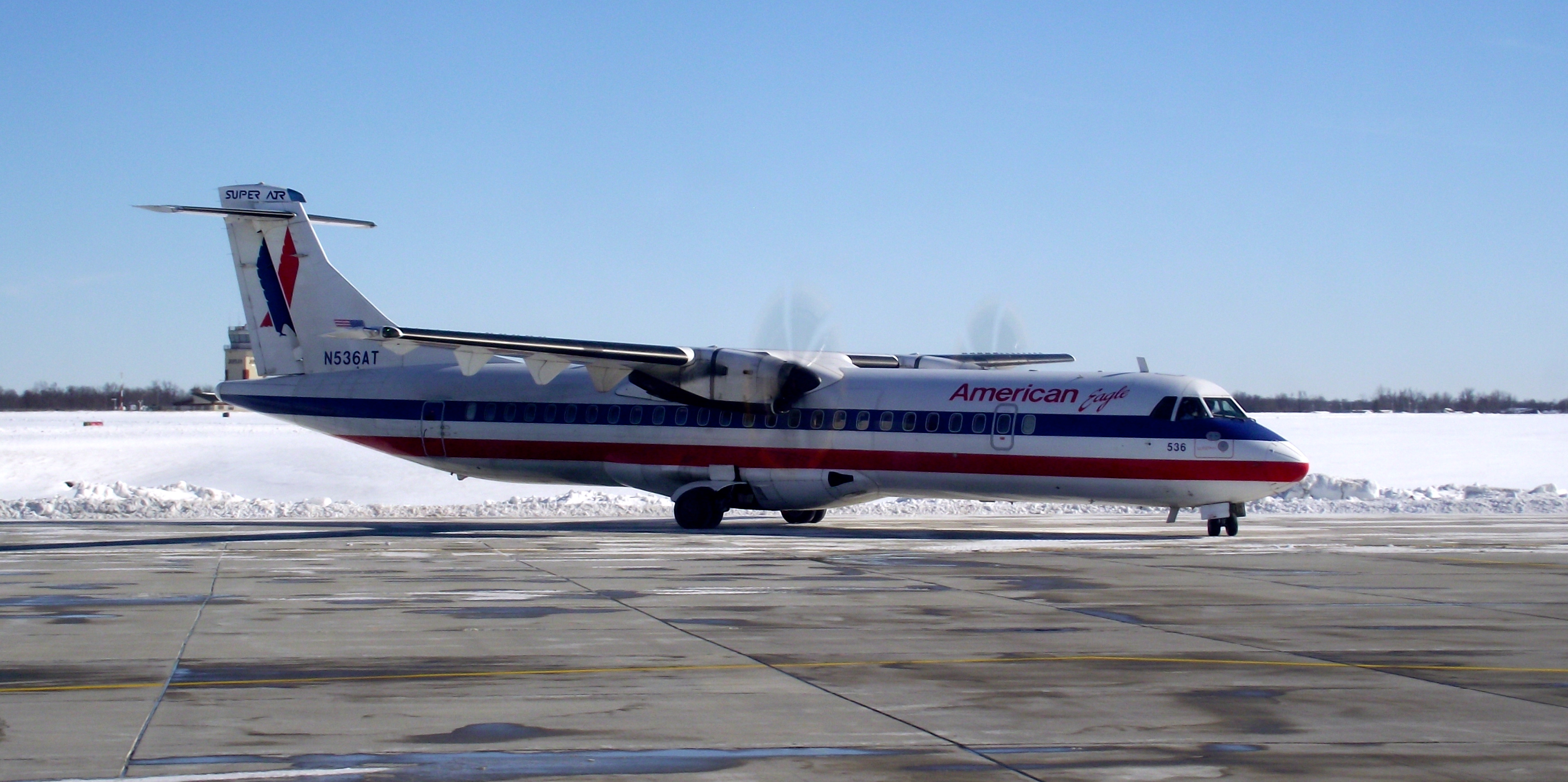
American Eagle ATR 72 operated by Executive Airlines at Joplin Regional Airport. (February 2011)

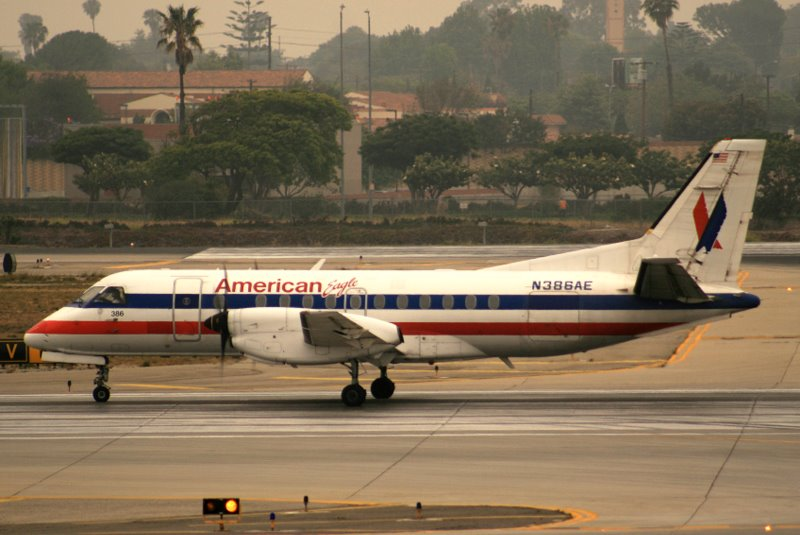
A Saab 340 formerly operated by American Eagle at Los Angeles International Airport. (June 2007)

The American Eagle brand, through its various regional and commuter airline partners, operated a variety of twin-turboprop aircraft over the years including the following types:

Aircraft	Total	Introduced	Retired	Replacement	Notes
ATR 42	51	1991	2004	ATR 72	Operated by Executive Airlines
ATR 72	46	1991	2013	Embraer ERJ 145	Operated by Executive Airlines
BAe Jetstream 31	15	1991	1994	Saab 340	Operated by Wings West Airlines
BAe Jetstream 32	48	1991	1994	Saab 340	Operated by Wings West Airlines
Beechcraft Model 99	2+	1985	1994	None	Operated by Wings West Airlines
Bombardier Dash 8-100	30	2013	2018	Embraer ERJ 145	Operated by Piedmont Airlines
Bombardier Dash 8-300	11	2013	2018	Embraer ERJ 145	Operated by Piedmont Airlines
CASA C-212	12+	1986	1993	ATR 42, and ATR 72	Operated by Chaparral Airlines and Executive Airlines
Convair 580	14	1984	1993	Saab 340	Operated by Metro Airlines
Embraer EMB 120 Brasilia	4	1986	1988	Fairchild Metroliner	Operated by Air Midwest
Fairchild Metroliner	101+	1985	1998	ATR 42, ATR 72, and Saab 340	Operated by Wings West Airlines and Air Midwest
Grumman Gulfstream I-C (G-159C)	5	1984	1990	None	Operated by Chaparral Airlines
NAMC YS-11	21	1985	1993	Saab 340	Operated by Simmons Airlines
Saab 340	143	1993	2008	Embraer ERJ 145 and Bombardier CRJ700	Operated by Simmons Airlines and Envoy Air
Short 330	20	1985	1990	None	Operated by Command Airways and Metro Airlines
Short 360	20	1991	1994	Saab 340	Operated by Simmons Airlines and Flagship Airlines

== Accidents and incidents ==
- May 8, 1987: American Eagle Flight 5452, operated by regional airline Executive Airlines, a CASA 212-200, was on a domestic passenger flight between San Juan, Puerto Rico-Mayaguez, Puerto Rico when it crashed short of Runway 09 while landing at Mayaguez. After impact, the plane continued through a chain-link fence and ditch. Two of six occupants (four passengers and two crew) were killed. The cause of the crash was determined to be improper maintenance in setting the flight idle propeller and engine fuel flow.
- February 19, 1988: American Eagle Flight 3378, a Fairchild Swearingen Metroliner operated by Air Virginia, was on a regularly scheduled flight between Raleigh-Richmond when it crashed into a reservoir about a mile from Raleigh-Durham International Airport, from where it had departed, in the vicinity of Cary, North Carolina. The aircraft departed during low-ceiling, low-visibility, and night conditions. Analysis of radar data indicated the aircraft was in a 45-degree descending turn. Both crew members and all 10 passengers were killed.
- June 7, 1992: American Eagle Flight 5456, operated by regional airline Executive Airlines, was on a regular flight between San Juan, Puerto Rico and Mayaguez, Puerto Rico when it lost control and crashed nose-down about 3/4 mile from the Mayaguez, Puerto Rico airport. Both crew and all three passengers were killed. The aircraft involved was a CASA 212-200.
- February 1, 1994: American Eagle Flight 3641, a Saab 340 operated by Simmons Airlines, crash landed at False River Air Park in New Roads, Louisiana; only one minor injury was reported.
- October 31, 1994: American Eagle Flight 4184, an ATR 72 operated by AMR's regional airline Simmons Airlines, crashed near Roselawn, Indiana. The aircraft inverted, dived, and crashed from a holding pattern at 10,000 feet (3050 m) "after a ridge of ice accreted beyond the deice boots" resulting in an unexpected aileron hinge moment reversal that subsequently resulted in the loss of control. The four crew and 64 passengers were all killed. In the months following the accident, American Eagle redeployed its ATR fleet to Miami and the Caribbean where icing is not an issue. The aircraft manufacturer, ATR, has since improved the anti-ice boots. The American Eagle aircraft were modified with the updated deicing system. All ATR 72s were retired from American Eagle's fleet in 2013.
- December 13, 1994: American Eagle Flight 3379, operated by AMR's regional airline Flagship Airlines, a Jetstream 31, was on a regularly scheduled Raleigh-Greensboro-Raleigh service when it crashed into a wooded area about four miles southwest of the Raleigh-Durham International Airport in the vicinity of Morrisville, NC. Of the 20 onboard (18 passengers and two crewmembers) 15 were killed while the five survivors received serious injuries. The probable cause of the crash was the pilot not following proper procedure in an engine-failure situation.
- July 9, 1995: American Eagle Flight 4127, an ATR 72 operated by Simmons Airlines, experienced loss of the rear cabin entry door during its climb after taking off from O'Hare International Airport in Chicago. The cabin door opened shortly after the first officer began to pressurize the cabin; therefore, only a slight pressure differential existed between the cabin and atmospheric pressures. Lack of damage indicates the door was unlocked/unlatched when it opened. The airplane was one of fifteen aircraft equipped with a new handrail and door handle design different from the majority of the ATR 72 fleet. The old handle was pulled down to latch/lock the door and pushed up to unlatch/unlock the door. The direction of motion was reversed, requiring the handle to be pushed up to latch/lock the door, and pulled down to unlatch/unlock it. On July 10, 1995, a private citizen discovered the separated door submerged in approximately two feet of water in the Des Plaines River. In response to this incident, ATR developed a new door handle design that reinstated the original motion, where pushing up unlatches/unlocks the door, and pulling down latches/locks it.
- May 8, 1999: American Eagle Flight 4925, a Saab 340B, registered N232AE, crashed on approach to JFK airport after being held in a holding pattern due to the visibility on the ground being below minimums. The flight descended too rapidly; however, because the flight crew were sleep deprived, they believed they were descending normally, even though there were cockpit alarms going off telling that they were not, in fact radar data revealed that they were descending at 2,950 ft/min. Later, when the flight was over the runway, the pilot descended and touched down 7,000 feet past the touch down point, and even though they used full brakes and reverse thrust, the plane departed the runway at 75 knots and traveled 248 feet past the threshold before stopping. As a result, there was only one serious injury; everyone else was unharmed. The NTSB determined that pilot fatigue was a culprit in the accident.

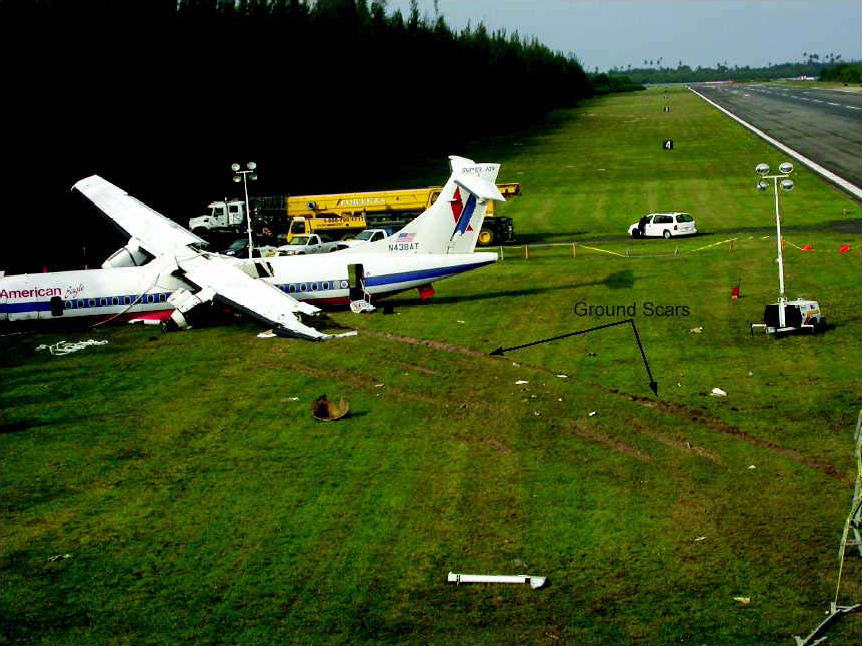
NTSB photo of Flight 5401 at the crash site

- May 9, 2004: American Eagle Flight 5401, an ATR 72 operated by Executive Airlines, crashed in San Juan, Puerto Rico after the captain lost control of the aircraft while landing. Seventeen people were injured, but there were no fatalities.
- January 2006: American Eagle Flight 3008 from San Luis Obispo to Los Angeles, a Saab 340 operated by American Eagle Airlines, encountered icing at 11,000 feet and regained control only at 6,500 feet, after some 50 seconds' descent. During the incident, in which no one was injured, the autopilot disconnected, the stall alarm/clacker sounded, and the plane rolled sharply left and right, experienced vibration, and pitched down. Manual deice boots were activated and ice could be heard shedding off and striking the fuselage. The NTSB report on this incident referenced three other Saab 340 icing incidents, as well as the Flight 4184 incident referenced above. The three were November 11, 1998, in Eildon Weir, Victoria, Australia; June 28, 2002, in Bathurst, New South Wales, Australia; and June 18, 2004, in Albury, New South Wales, Australia.
- February 15, 2017: American Eagle Flight 5320 from Charlotte Douglas International Airport to Gulfport–Biloxi International Airport struck a deer while taking off from runway 36C. The CRJ-700 was forced to turn around and abort the flight. The plane could be seen trailing a vapor stream from the right-wing as it circled back to land. Officials said there was a fuel leak, and crews sprayed the plane with foam. There were no injuries. The aircraft would later crash as Flight 5342.
- November 11, 2019: American Eagle Flight 4125 from Greensboro, North Carolina, to Chicago O'Hare International Airport, an Embraer ERJ-145 operated by Envoy Air, slid off the runway while landing in icy conditions. All 38 passengers and three crew were uninjured.
- January 29, 2025: American Eagle Flight 5342 from Wichita Dwight D. Eisenhower National Airport to Ronald Reagan Washington National Airport, a Bombardier CRJ701ER, operated by PSA Airlines, collided with a United States Army Sikorsky UH-60 Black Hawk helicopter on final approach to Reagan Airport when the Blackhawk flew into the path of the CRJ701ER, causing both to crash into the Potomac River, killing all 60 passengers and 4 crew on board along with all 3 crew on board the helicopter. This was the first hull loss and fatal accident involving the Bombardier CRJ700 series.
