= Meadows Field Airport =

Regional airport in Oildale, California, United States

Meadows Field AFB Kern County Airport No. 1
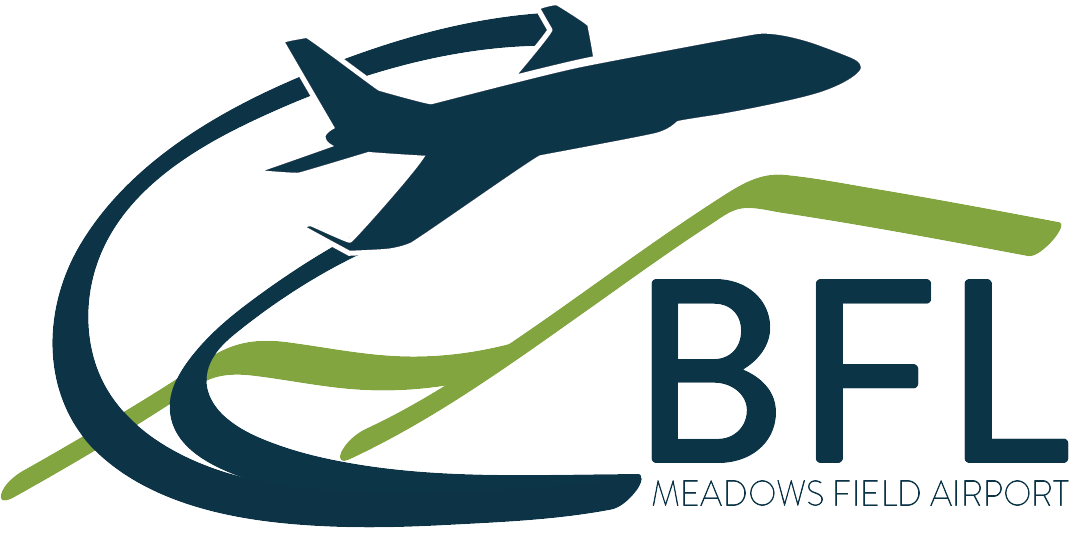

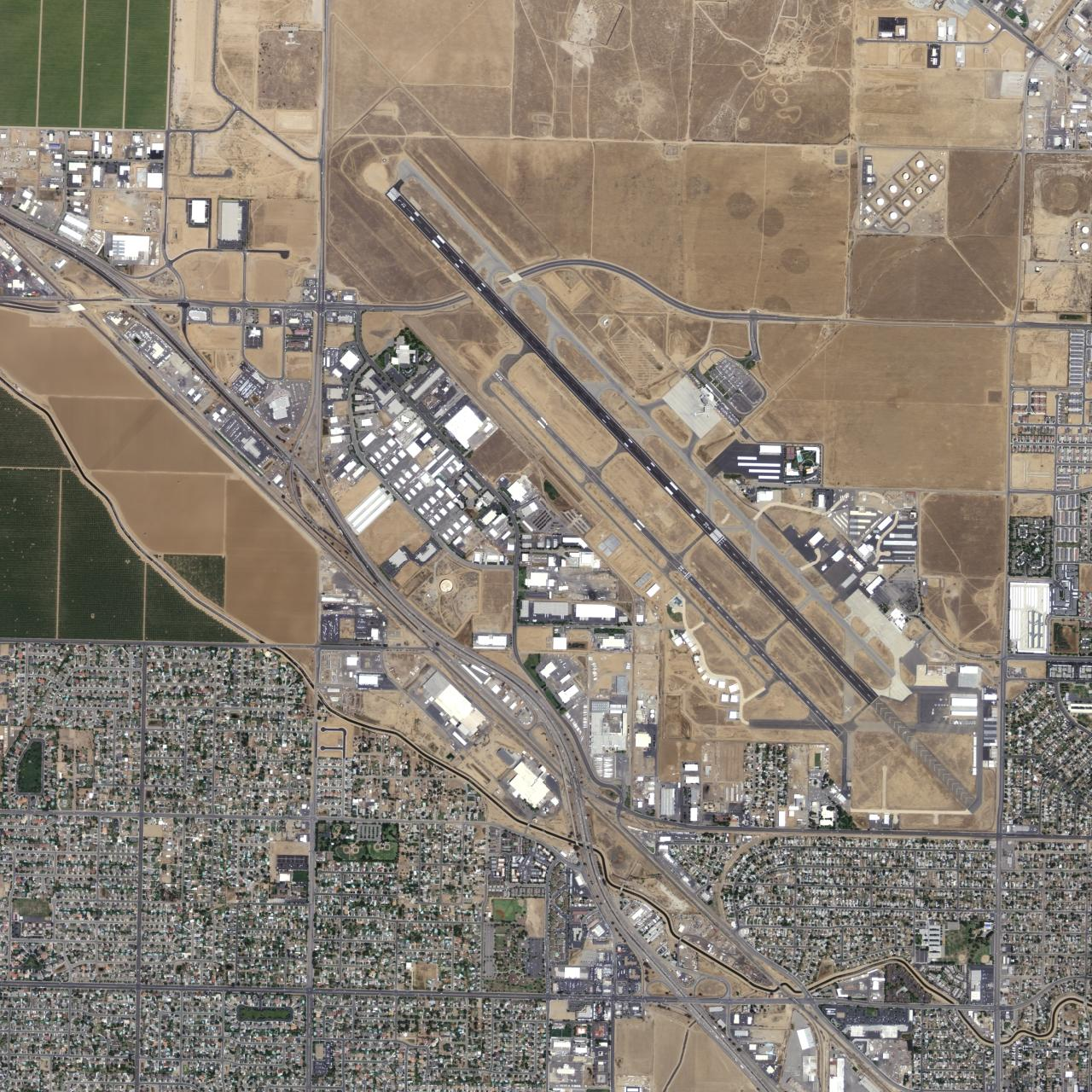
- USGS 2006 orthophoto
- IATA: BFL; ICAO: KBFL; FAA LID: BFL

Summary
- Airport type: Public
- Owner: Kern County
- Operator: Kern County Department of Airports
- Serves: Greater Bakersfield metropolitan area
- Location: Oildale, California
- Time zone: PST (UTC−08:00)
  - Summer (DST): PDT (UTC−07:00)
- Elevation AMSL: 510 ft (160 m)
- Coordinates: 35°26′02″N 119°03′28″W
- Website: meadowsfield.com

Maps
- FAA airport diagram
- Interactive map of Meadows Field AFB

Runways
Direction	Length		Surface
Direction	ft	m	Surface
12L/30R	10,849	3,307	Asphalt
12R/30L	7,700	2,347	Asphalt

Statistics (2025)
- Total Passengers: 435,000
- Aircraft operations: 103,929
- Based aircraft (2021): 194
- Source: Federal Aviation Administration, BTS

Meadows Field (IATA: BFL, ICAO: KBFL, FAA LID: BFL) is a public airport in Kern County, California, United States, three miles northwest of downtown Bakersfield. It is the main airport for the Bakersfield area, and one of two airports in the San Joaquin Valley, the other being Fresno Yosemite International Airport. Also known as Kern County Airport #1, it is located in an area of unincorporated Kern County adjacent to Oildale, California.

Federal Aviation Administration records show 141,847 passenger boardings (enplanements) in calendar year 2008, 103,067 in 2009 and 111,699 in 2010. It is included in the Federal Aviation Administration (FAA) National Plan of Integrated Airport Systems for 2021–2025, in which it is categorized as a non-hub primary commercial service facility.

== History ==
Aviation has been linked to Kern County for almost as long as the existence of the industry. In 1891, Charles Howard ascended in a hot air balloon to 1,000 feet (300 m). He jumped and landed safely with a parachute he designed and constructed. By 1910, only seven years after the Wright Brothers' first airplane flight, aircraft began arriving in the county. They were brought in by Glenn Curtiss (in conjunction with the Kern County Board of Trade). The first flight in the area was flown by Charles Hamilton.

Bakersfield then had two airfields. The more prominent field was at Sacramento and Monterey streets in East Bakersfield (at the time, mostly empty fields). It was named Bernard Field and was run by the Pacific Aero Club. The field would be a stop for US Air Mail from 1923 to 1926 (when that moved to Meadows Field). Another airfield was on the Panorama Bluffs in Northeast Bakersfield where Greenlawn Mortuary is today.

With the development of commercial air service, Bakersfield needed a purpose-built commercial airport. In 1926, the Kern County Chamber of Commerce constructed and operated a new airport called Kern County Airport No. 1. Originally at the intersection of U.S. Route 99 and Norris Road, the following year it was moved one mile east to its current location. The original facility had one runway, one terminal building, and a few hangars and other buildings. In 1935, Kern County bought the airport from the Chamber of Commerce. It was the first county-owned airport in the nation.

=== United States Army Air Force use ===
In September 1939, war broke out in Europe, prompting Congress to appropriate $40 million for the Development of Landing Areas for National Defense (DLAND). Under DLAND, the secretaries of War, Commerce, and the Navy approved expenditures for airports. By 1941, the Army Air Corps had begun directing aid to Meadows Field for improvements to include the operation of airport towers.

In late 1943, the United States Army Air Forces acquired usage rights to Meadows Field. It was placed under the jurisdiction of the IV Fighter Command. The 481st Night Fighter Operational Training Group (NFOTG) used the facility as part of the Army Air Forces Night Fighter School, which had transferred from Florida to Hammer Field, California. Meadows Field was used as an auxiliary training airfield and the school operated a combination of modified Douglas A-20 Havocs for night fighter operations, designated P-70, and brand-new prototype YP-61 Black Widow night fighters.

Between May 1 and July 12, 1944, the 427th Night Fighter Squadron trained at Meadows Field; the 549th Night Fighter Squadron trained there between July and October 1944. In addition, flights of P-61s from the 426th, 547th, 548th, and 550th Night Fighter squadrons moved in and out of Meadows Field during 1944 as part of their training prior to being deployed to combat units, primarily in the Pacific and CBI theaters.

In December 1944, the 481st NFOTG was inactivated as part of an AAF reorganization. Meadows Field was placed on standby status and the airport was only used for emergency purposes, being under the control of Hammer Field.

A Republic XF-84H Thunderscreech, an experimental fighter powered by a turboprop engine, was on display at the entrance to the former air terminal at Skyway Drive and Hanger Way until 1992 when it was reclaimed and moved to the National Museum of the United States Air Force. It was subsequently replaced by a U.S. Air Force T-38 Talon supersonic jet trainer. The T-38 was donated and was moved to the Minter Field Air Museum at Shafter Airport in 2015.

=== Return to civil control and expansion ===
After the war, Meadows Field would return to being a commercial airport. In the mid-1950s, Kern County would modernize the airport. The land was purchased and new facilities were built; in 1957, a new terminal and control tower was built east of the runway. That year, the county renamed the airport Meadows Field (by a board of minute order on August 6, 1957), after Cecil Meadows. He was the county's Director of Airports from 1935 to 1957, except during World War II when he was a pilot in the armed forces. He was also responsible for the county purchasing the airport and modernization efforts.

=== Historical airline service ===
Commercial airline service to Bakersfield dates back to 1927 when Pacific Air Transport operated a route from Los Angeles to Seattle stopping at Bakersfield, Fresno, San Francisco, Medford, and Portland. By 1934, Pacific Air Transport merged with three other carriers to become United Airlines. United flew Boeing 727s and Boeing 737-200s to Los Angeles and to San Francisco from the late 1960s until 1979 and again from 1984 to 1987. For a short time in 1933 and 1934, Transcontinental and Western Air (TWA) served the city on a San Francisco-Fresno-Bakersfield-Los Angeles route. Other carriers include Southwest Airways and successors Pacific Air Lines, Air West, and Hughes Airwest that served the airport from 1956 until 1979 with Fairchild F-27 and DC-9-10s. In 1966, Pacific Air Lines operated Boeing 727-100s nonstop to Los Angeles and Fresno and one-stop to San Francisco; this was the airport's first jet service. Pacific Express served the airport with BAC One-Elevens nonstop to San Francisco and Santa Barbara during the 1980s. Continental Airlines flew Douglas DC-9s on a Las Vegas-Houston route in 1982 and flew Boeing 737-200s to Denver from 1987–1988. America West Airlines operated mainline service to Las Vegas from 1990–1991 using the De Havilland Dash 8 turboprop. From 1984 until 1999, American Airlines operated Dallas/Fort Worth service using the McDonnell Douglas MD-80 which initially included a Santa Barbara stopover. From September 1994 through April 1995, American operated a Boeing 757-200 to John Wayne Airport and one-stop to Chicago-O'Hare which is believed to be the largest commercial jetliner to serve Bakersfield. Allegiant Air operated to Las Vegas from 2010–2011 using the McDonnell Douglas MD-80, and Frontier Airlines briefly flew Airbus A319s to Denver in 2014.

From 2007 until 2008, Mexicana flew Airbus A318s non-stop to Guadalajara.

A number of commuter and regional carriers have served the airport including Air Pacific, Air L.A., American Eagle Airlines, Apollo Airways, Aspen Airways, Cal-State Air Lines, ExpressJet Airlines (initially operating as Continental Express and later independently), Imperial Airlines, Golden Gate Airlines, Golden West Airlines, Laughlin Express, Mesa Airlines (initially operating independently and later as America West Express and successor US Airways Express), Pacific Coast Airlines, SkyWest (initially operating independently and later as Western Express, Delta Connection and US Airways Express), Sun Aire, StatesWest Airlines (operating as USAir Express), Swift Aire Lines, WestAir (operating as United Express), and Wings West Airlines.

=== Deregulation and decline ===
The airport saw increased air service during the 1950s and 1960s; in 1975, annual enplanements would reach 97,000. The growth ended with airline deregulation in 1978. While other cities saw a decrease of prices and increase in service, almost all air service was eliminated from Meadows Field in favor of other airports such as LAX (about 120 miles (190 km) south). The City of Bakersfield and the County of Kern attempted to prevent a reduction in service by filing a joint lawsuit; however, the court sided with the federal government. Annual enplanements fell 59%, from 147,866 in 1978 to 60,958 in 1981 (although the next year it would rebound to 90,000). Air service would eventually average 120,000 enplanements between 1980 and 2000.

Service was expensive compared to nearby airports and normally ran during inconvenient times. Service was also inconsistent, with airlines frequently starting and ending routes. During the same time period, the region also saw a large growth in population. While the City of Bakersfield grew 134%, and the County of Kern grew 64%, the airport did not see an increase in service to match. Except for the lengthening of the main runway in 1987 to accommodate wide-body jets, few improvements were done at Meadows Field during that period.

=== Rebirth and rise to international airport ===
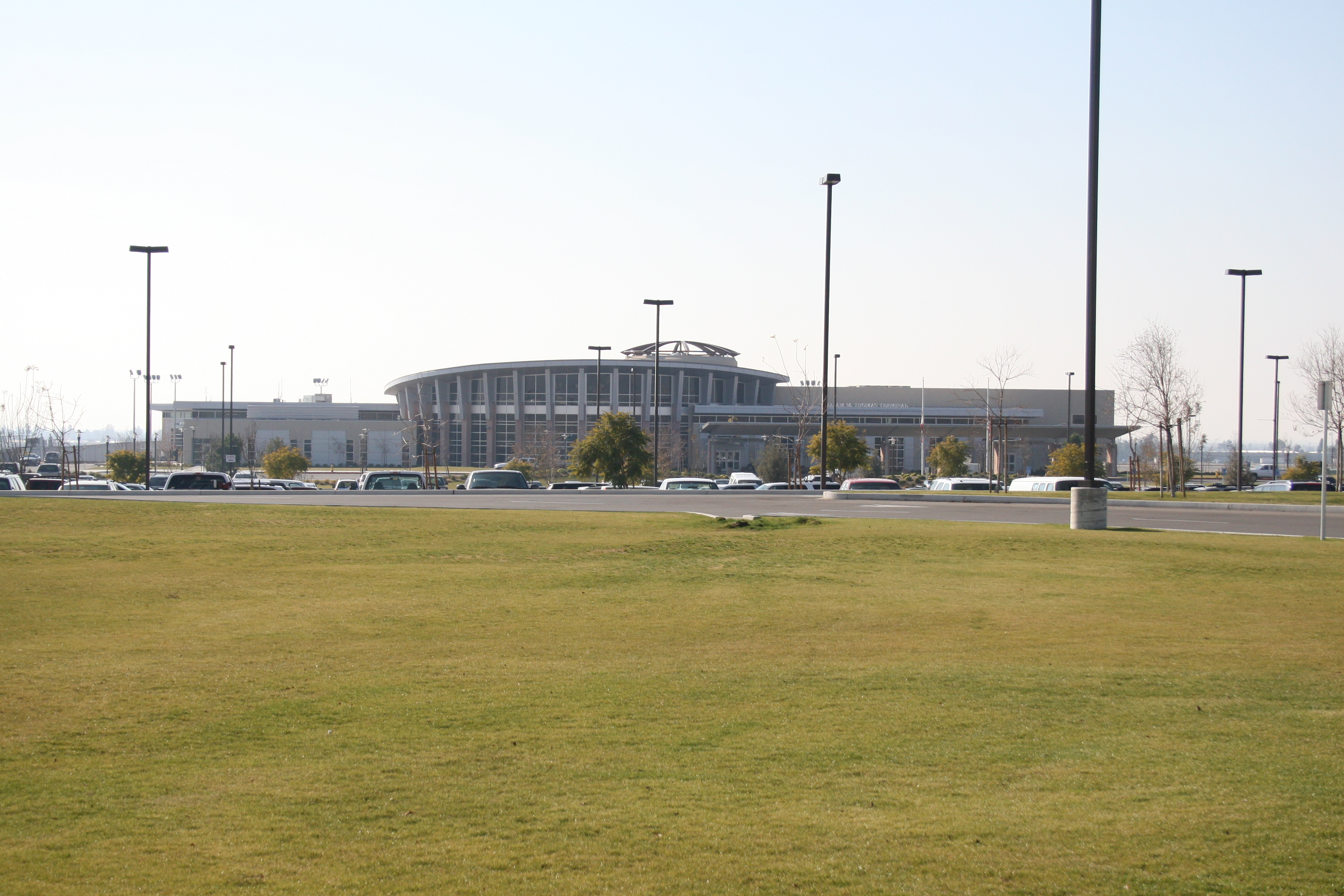
Terminal at Meadows Field

In the early 2000s, the county started an initiative to address the problems in air service. In 2002, it was estimated that about 400,000 people who lived in the service area of the airport chose to fly from a different location; 25% of those flew to destinations in Mexico. Kern County started multiple projects to address the reluctance of airlines to use the airport. They included: installing centerline landing lights on the main runway, extending the second runway to 7,700 feet (the length most airplanes that use the airport would need), construction of a new terminal with jet bridges and inside baggage claim, and remodeling the existing terminal to accommodate international flights. Most improvements were completed by 2006, with the international terminal completed in 2007.

Initial response was favorable. Four new airlines would start service at the airport, including international service to Mexico operated by Mexicana. This would also increase enplanements above the levels set in 1978. However, high gas prices and the subsequent recession of 2008 would reduce service to 2002 levels, including the loss of the airport's international carrier. However, the US Customs house would remain open. In addition to serving international charter and unscheduled flights, it would process international cargo. Both the Tejon Industrial Complex (south of Bakersfield) and the International Trade and Transportation Center (in Shafter, west of Bakersfield) would lease warehouse space at the airport for use by their clients.

== Facilities ==
Meadows Field covers 1,357 acres (549 ha) at an elevation of 510 feet (155 m). It has two asphalt runways: 12L/30R is 10,849 by 150 feet (3,307 x 46 m) and 12R/30L is 7,700 by 100 feet (2,347 x 30 m).

The main runway, 12L-30R, is the longest in the San Joaquin Valley. It is classified as a commercial D-IV runway, but can handle Boeing 747s. The other runway, 12R-30L, is a general aviation B-II runway. Although only 75 feet of width is required for this classification, the runway is 25 feet wider to allow it to serve as an alternate runway for turboprop and regional jets.

In the year ending May 31, 2018, the airport had 61,229 aircraft operations, average 168 per day: 76% general aviation, 20% air taxi, 4% airline, and <1% military. In November 2021, 194 aircraft were based at the airport: 108 single-engine, 52 multi-engine, 32 jet, 1 ultralight, and 1 helicopter.

== Terminals ==
=== William M. Thomas Terminal ===
William M. Thomas Terminal has six gates numbered 2 through 6. Gate 1 is inoperational due to the lack of a jet bridge, and Gate 6 is at ground level. The terminal also contains an Omni Goods gift shop and a Blimpie sandwich restaurant. Features of the terminal include a rotunda with compass point floor design and a scaled model of Spaceship One (which flew out of Mojave about 50 miles (80 km) east of Bakersfield). It is also constructed on a hill, which allows for all passenger services to be on the second level, while airport services are on the first. The terminal was constructed in 2006 at a cost of $33.8 million and designed by Odell Associates.

=== International Air Terminal ===
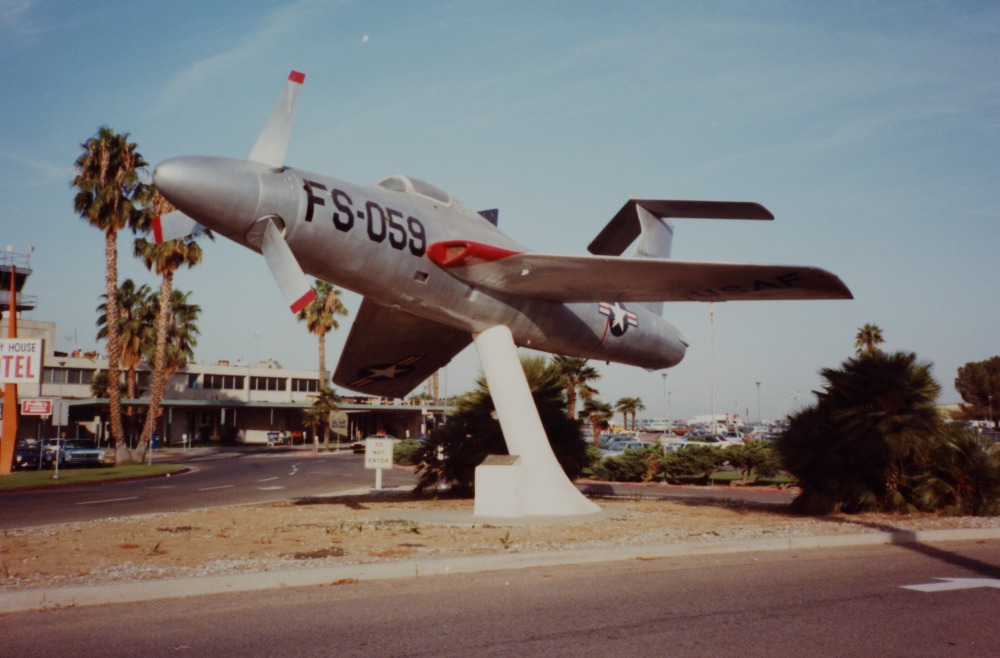
Republic XF-84H Thunderscreech on display with the old terminal in the background, 1982

Kern County Air Terminal was built in 1957 and had three gates: 4, 5, 5A. It handled all commercial flights until the William M. Thomas Terminal opened in 2006.

In 2006, the terminal underwent a $1 million renovation and an adjacent $7 million US Customs & Immigration facility was built. The terminal was reopened in 2007 and renamed "International Air Terminal at Meadows Field" to handle both international departures and arrivals.

The terminal closed again in 2008 when its only air carrier, Mexicana, suspended service. As of December 2020, the terminal remains mothballed and all of its signage has been covered up or removed.

The terminal had an adjacent motel known as Skyway Inn, and a restaurant which in its existence was known as Freddie's at the Skyway House, Anton's Airport Bar & Grille, Milano's, and Skyway Steakhouse. Both the motel and the restaurant were closed in 2001 due to the decline in passenger traffic following the September 11 attacks and were later demolished in 2005.

== Airlines and destinations ==
=== Passenger ===
Airlines	Destinations
American Airlines	Dallas/Fort Worth, Phoenix–Sky Harbor
American Eagle	Phoenix–Sky Harbor
United Airlines	Seasonal: Denver
United Express	Denver, Los Angeles, San Francisco

=== Cargo ===
Airlines	Destinations
Ameriflight	Burbank, Ontario, San Luis Obispo
FedEx Feeder operated by West Air	Ontario

== Statistics ==
=== Top destinations ===
Busiest domestic routes from BFL (August 2025 – July 2026)
Rank	Airport	Passengers	Carriers
1	Phoenix-Sky Harbor, Arizona	84,480	American
2	Denver, Colorado	49,230	United
3	Dallas/Ft. Worth, Texas	41,080	American
4	San Francisco, California	30,630	United

=== Airline Market Share ===
Largest airlines at BFL (August 2025 – July 2026)
Rank	Airline	Passengers	Market Share
1	SkyWest Airlines	236,000	57.72%
2	American Airlines	148,000	36.36%
3	United Airlines	13,510	3.31%
4	Envoy Air	10,650	2.61%

== Terminal connections ==
Although the International Terminal is currently closed (the US Customhouse remains open), when the terminal was open there was no airport transportation between it and the Domestic Terminal. There is also no road connection or pedestrian access between the two terminals. For passengers to transfer (from the international terminal to the domestic terminal), they would leave the airport and turn left on Airport Drive. They would then turn left on Merle Haggard Drive. Passengers would then re-enter the airport at Wings Way, a distance of approximately 2.5 miles (4.0 km). There is a long-term plan to extend Wings Way through the airport, which would provide a more direct connection, but there is no date for construction.

== Ground transportation ==
=== Road ===
The airport is located at the intersection of Merle Haggard Drive and Airport Drive, in Oildale (also called North Bakersfield). Access to the Domestic Terminal is from Merle Haggard Drive while access to the International Terminal is from Airport Drive. The primary signed route to the airport is via SR 99 (Golden State Freeway). Drivers traveling north exit at Porterville Highway (SR 65) while drivers traveling south exit at 7th Standard Road/Merle Haggard Drive. In both cases, drivers then turn east on Merle Haggard Drive, which leads to the airport. There is an alternate signed route via Golden State Highway (SR 204 Freeway). Drivers exit at Airport Drive, and travel north to the airport.

The Domestic Terminal provides fee parking for both short-term, and long-term parking. People can also park for free in the short term parking for a limited amount of time. The International Terminal provides free parking for both short term, and long term parking.

=== Public transportation ===
Public transportation to the airport was provided exclusively by Golden Empire Transit. Routes 22 and 45 stop close to the airport, but not inside. There are no scheduled bus routes to the Domestic Terminal.

=== Rental car/taxi ===
Rental cars are only available at the Domestic Terminal. Currently four companies are located at the airport. Rental car counter space is on the east side of the terminal, with the car lots directly outside the east exit.

Taxi stands are located outside the north entrance to the terminal, across the street. Taxis are sometimes available when flights are arriving at the airport. Meadows Field also lists two taxi companies on their website, which provide 24-hour pickup, if no taxis are available.

As of July 1, 2025 the airport is serviced by Lyft and Uber.

== Future ==
Kern County has planned several improvements to the airport over the next 20 years, all of which are based on future demand.

=== Passenger ===
The domestic terminal was constructed in anticipation of future expansion. Currently, it has four jet bridges to connect passengers to aircraft. Without any new construction, an additional jet bridge can be added. The existing gate area can then be extended towards the runway for an additional seven gates. After that, a new concourse can be constructed on the west side of the terminal for 12 more gates. That puts the ultimate capacity for the terminal at 24 gates.

Other facilities are planned to expand with these future changes to the terminal. The existing parking lot will grow both east and west. The rental car parking lots will be consolidated and relocated east of the terminal. Wings Way, the road that connects to the airport, will be extend to Airport Drive and connect to Day Avenue.

=== Cargo ===
Currently, all cargo operations are conducted out of a small facility, east of the international terminal. A new, expanded cargo facility is planned west of Merle Haggard Drive, north of the runway. Ultimate build out will contain 12 sortation buildings, 30,000 square feet (2,800 m^{2}) each. A road will connect them to trucking/warehouse/distribution facilities west of the airport. That road will terminate at Porterville Highway (SR 65) and Merle Haggard Drive (at Wings Way). Other aviation-related structures are planned in the area.

In addition, there is a long-term plan to construct a third parallel runway. Designated 13–31, it will be located north of the cargo facilities, as well as Merle Haggard Drive. The runway is planned to be 8,000 feet (2,400 m) long and 150 feet (46 m) wide. It will be widely spaced, which will allow for simultaneous Instrument Flight Rule (IFR).

== See also ==
- California World War II Army Airfields
- Army Air Force School of Applied Tactics
- List of airports in Kern County, California

== Gallery ==
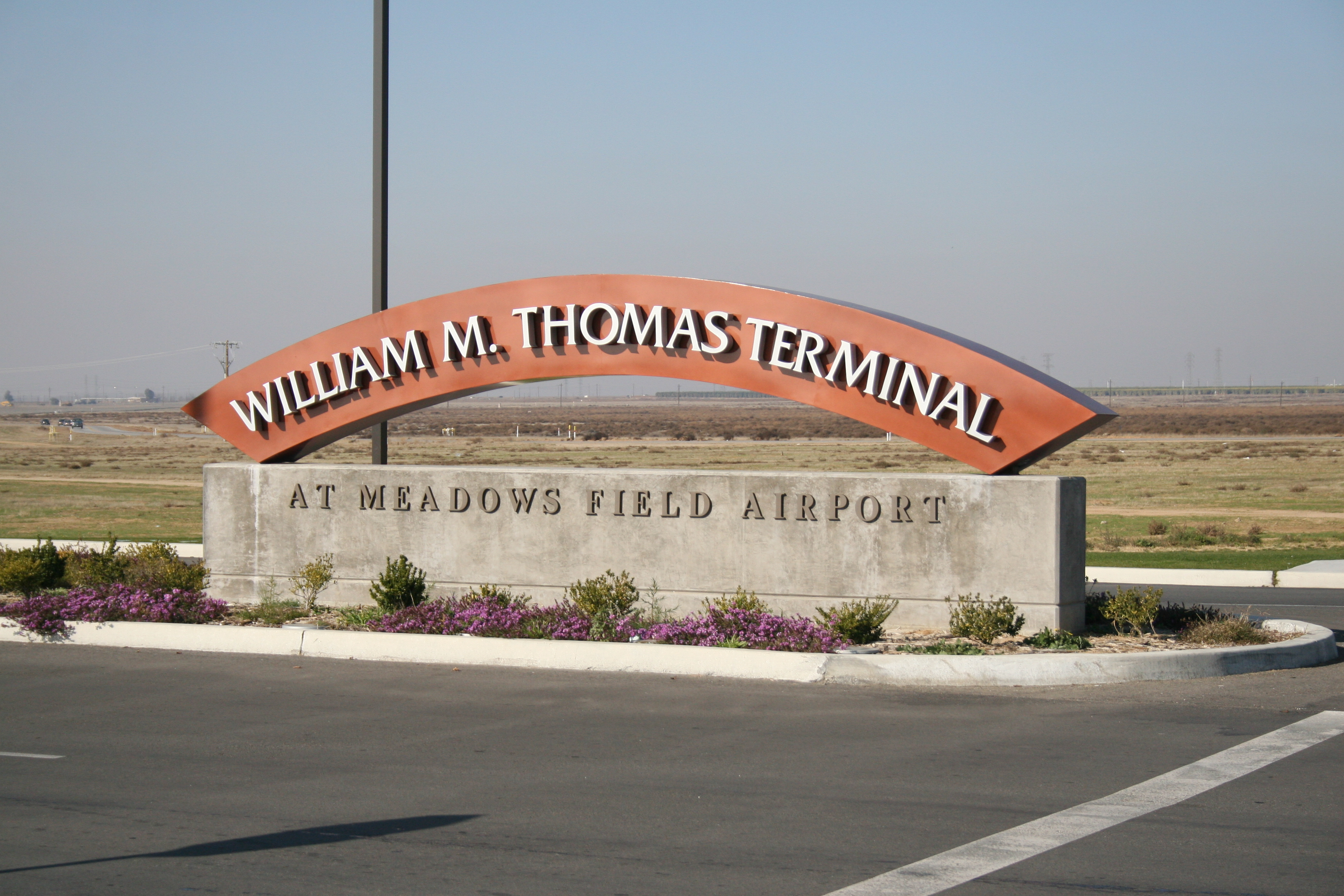
Entrance sign of the William M. Thomas Terminal at Meadows Field-BFL

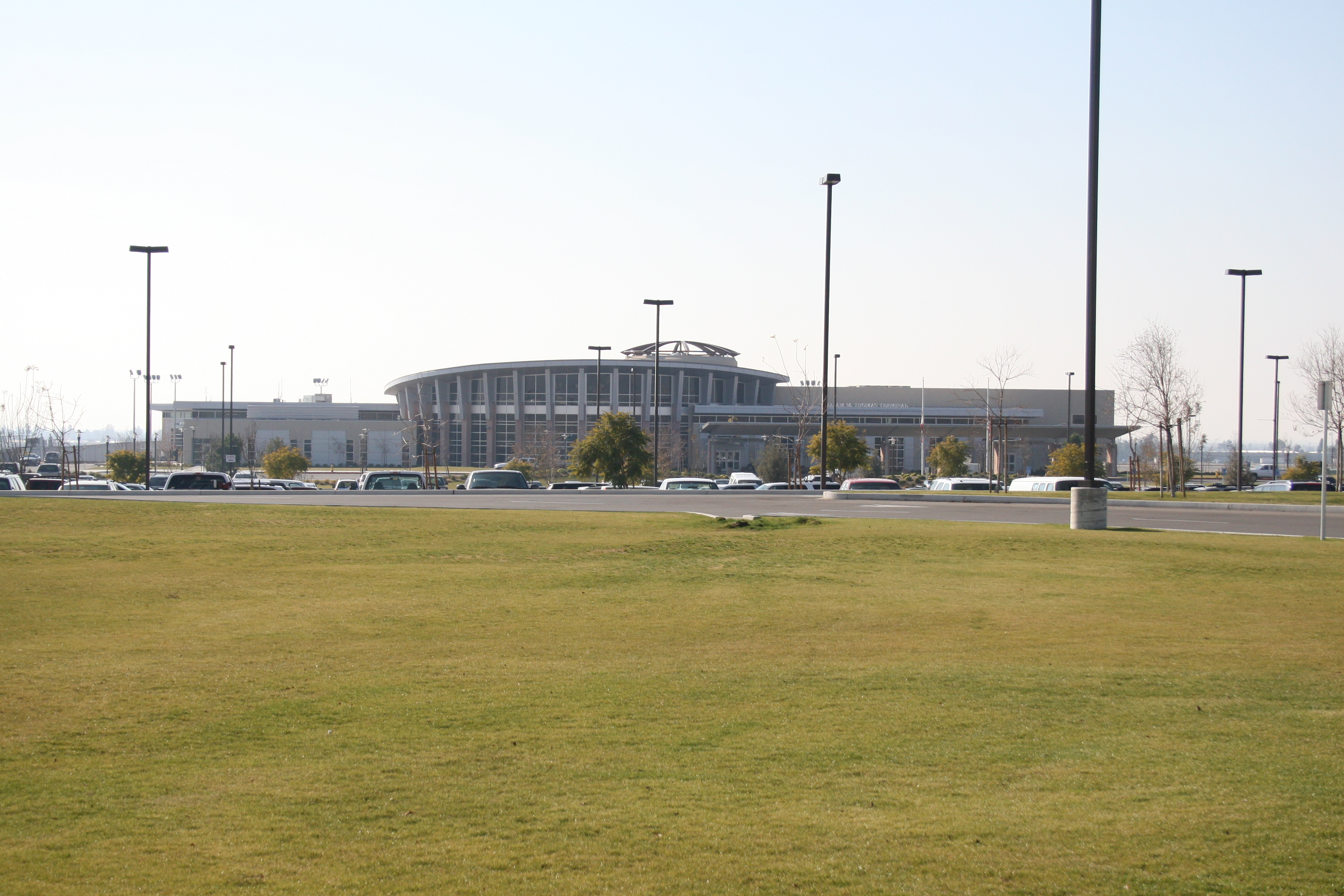
Exterior shot of the domestic terminal

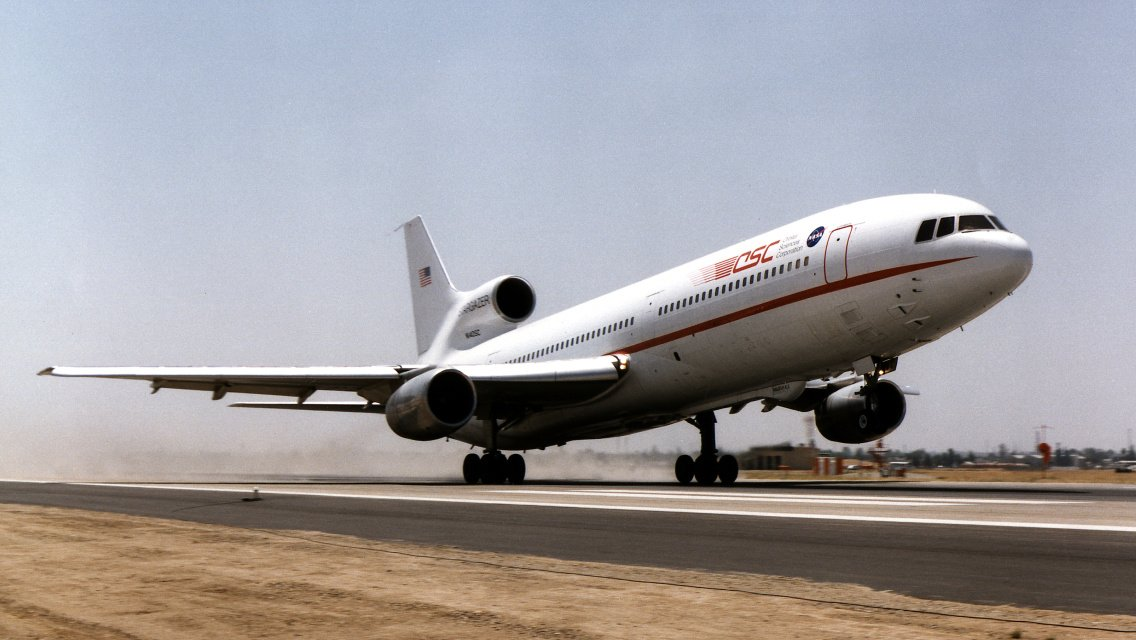
Orbital Sciences Corporation Stargazer lifting off from the runway
