= Santa Maria Public Airport =

Municipal airport in Santa Maria, California, United States

Santa Maria Public Airport Capt. G. Allan Hancock Field Santa Maria Army Airfield

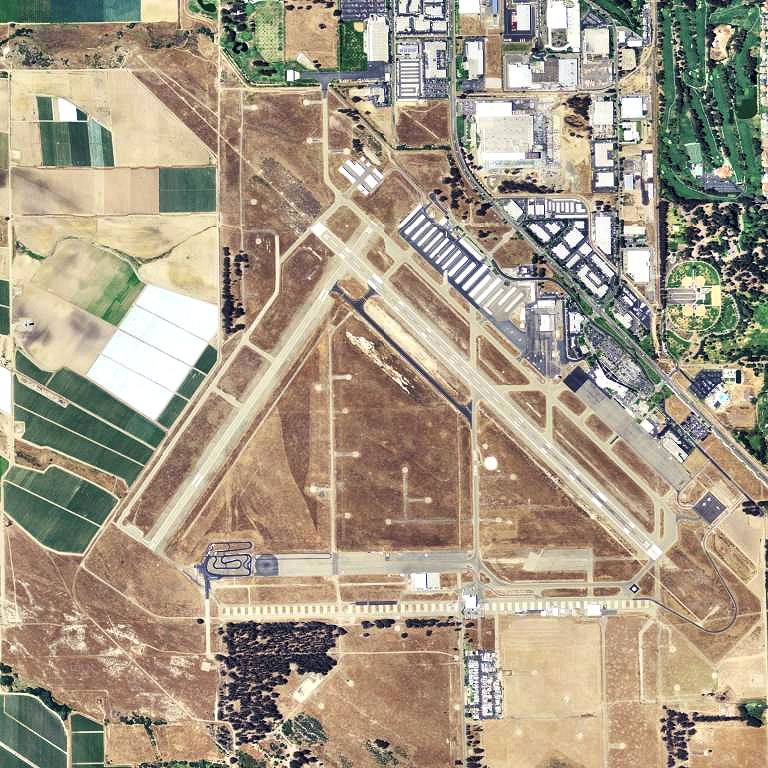
- 2006 USGS photo
- IATA: SMX; ICAO: KSMX; FAA LID: SMX; WMO: 72394

Summary
- Airport type: Public
- Owner: Santa Maria Public Airport District
- Serves: Santa Maria, California
- Elevation AMSL: 261 ft (80 m)
- Coordinates: 34°53′56″N 120°27′27″W
- Website: SantaMariaAirport.com

Maps
- FAA airport diagram
- Interactive map of Santa Maria Public Airport

Runways
Direction	Length		Surface
Direction	ft	m	Surface
12/30	8,004	2,440	Asphalt
2/20	5,189	1,582	Asphalt

Statistics (2024)
- Aircraft operations: 29,153
- Total passengers: 26,000
- Source: FAA, airport website

Santa Maria Public Airport (Capt. G. Allan Hancock Field) (IATA: SMX, ICAO: KSMX, FAA LID: SMX) is three miles (5 km) south of Santa Maria, in northern Santa Barbara County, California, United States.

== History ==
The airport was built by the United States Army during World War II, known as Santa Maria Army Air Field. Its primary mission was to provide training for B-25 bomber pilots, however flight training was abandoned by December 1942. The field fell into a state of disuse until the arrival of the Lockheed P-38 twin engine fighter in September 1943.

During its use by the military Santa Maria AAF also controlled Estrella Army Airfield, near Paso Robles as an auxiliary airfield to support the pilot training activity.

After the war Santa Barbara County and the city of Santa Maria acquired the land and facilities through two grants in 1948. In 1964 the Army Air Field was renamed Santa Maria Public Airport.

The Santa Maria Museum of Flight opened at the airport in 1988.

In 2020, the airport was again used for training by a fleet of military jets while Naval Air Station Point Mugu was performing maintenance on its airfield. The fleet consisted of six 1960 Hawker Hunters multi-role fighters and two 1970 IAI Kfir interceptors.

The Planes of Fame Air Museum announced plans to open a new location at the airport in 2023.

=== Past airline service ===
The first airline at Santa Maria was Pacific Seaboard Air Lines. In 1933 Pacific Seaboard scheduled two daily Bellanca CH-300s Los Angeles - Santa Barbara - Santa Maria - San Luis Obispo - Paso Robles - Monterey - Salinas - San Jose - San Francisco. After receiving a mail contract, Pacific Seaboard moved its entire operation to the eastern U.S. in 1934, be renamed Chicago and Southern Air Lines, and in 1953 was acquired by and merged into Delta Air Lines. Southwest Airways Douglas DC-3s began service during the 1940s. The June 1, 1947 timetable lists three daily round trips Los Angeles-Oxnard-Santa Barbara-Santa Maria-San Luis Obispo-Coalinga-Monterey-Santa Cruz/Watsonville-San Jose/Moffett Field-San Francisco. Southwest changed its name to Pacific Air Lines and operated Martin 4-0-4s and Fairchild F-27s to Santa Maria in the 1960s. Pacific merged with Bonanza Air Lines and West Coast Airlines to form Air West in 1968, which became Hughes Airwest in 1970. Hughes Airwest then served Santa Maria with McDonnell Douglas DC-9-30s and Fairchild F-27s. In 1974 and 1975 Hughes Airwest operated McDonnell Douglas DC-9 Series 30 jets to Los Angeles and San Francisco. This was the only time Santa Maria had nonstop mainline jets to LAX and SFO at the same time. DC-9 jet flights ended in 1976 and Hughes Airwest F-27 flights to Santa Maria ended in 1979.

A number of commuter airlines served the airport. In 1968 Cable Commuter Airlines was flying de Havilland Canada DHC-6 Twin Otters to LAX. Cable Commuter was later merged into Golden West Airlines but service to Santa Maria ended in the early 1970s. Golden West briefly returned to the airport in 1982 using Short 330 aircraft. Santa Barbara-based Apollo Airways (which later changed its name to Pacific Coast Airlines) flying Handley Page HP.137 Jetstreams served Santa Maria during the latter 1970's.

Swift Aire Lines, based at nearby San Luis Obispo Airport, served Santa Maria through most of the 1970s decade with flights to Los Angeles, San Francisco, and San Jose, mainly with new Fokker F27 Friendships. Swift Aire also previously operated Nord 262s and de Havilland Herons to the airport and then ended service in 1981.

Wings West Airlines began service as an independent commuter air carrier in 1982 and then began operating as American Eagle on behalf of American Airlines in 1986. The San Luis Obispo-based carrier flew to Los Angeles and San Francisco with Beechcraft C99s, Fairchild Swearingen Metroliners, BAe Jetstream 31s, and Saab 340s operated as code sharing flights for American. Service was discontinued service in 1996.

West Air began flying as United Express on behalf of United Airlines in 1986 to San Francisco and later to Los Angeles. West Air flew BAe Jetstream 31s and Embraer EMB-110 Bandeirantes. Mesa Airlines bought out West Air in 1992 and continued service as United Express until 1997. From 1993 through 1995 Mesa operated as CalPac using Beechcraft 1900Cs on its United Express service.

SkyWest Airlines began flights to Santa Maria in 1985 when it acquired Sun Aire Lines which had begun serving the airport in 1982. In 1986 SkyWest began a code sharing agreement with Western Airlines and began flying as Western Express. One year later Western Airlines merged into Delta Air Lines and SkyWest's flights then began operating as Delta Connection. The carrier flew Fairchild Swearingen Metroliners and Embraer EMB-120 Brasilias, mainly to Los Angeles. In 1997 SkyWest changed its service from operating as Delta Connection to operate as United Express on behalf of United Airlines (replacing Mesa Airlines) still with service nonstop to Los Angeles using Embraer EMB-120 Brasilias. Flights to LAX were discontinued in 2015 in favor of nonstop flights to SFO using Canadair regional jets; however, SkyWest operating as United Express ceased all operations at Santa Maria on October 5, 2016.

Mokulele Airlines Cessna 208 Caravans replaced the SkyWest/United Express service to Los Angeles (LAX). In 2016, Mokulele moved its flights to the Los Angeles area from LAX to the Hollywood Burbank Airport but then dropped Santa Maria on November 30, 2017.

During the peak of its airline service from 1986 through 1996, Santa Maria saw service by American Eagle, Delta Connection, and United Express simultaneously and all three air carriers were operating a combined total of up to 22 flights per day to Los Angeles plus several flights to San Francisco with turboprop commuter aircraft. From 1997 until 2006 United Express was the only carrier at Santa Maria. Since United Express left Santa Maria in 2016, the city has had no service by an IATA carrier.

=== Current airline service ===
Allegiant Air began serving Santa Maria in 2006. The carrier currently flies Airbus A319 and Airbus A320 mainline jets nonstop to Las Vegas twice a week each way. Allegiant Air previously operated nonstop service to Phoenix via the Phoenix-Mesa Gateway Airport and Portland, OR. On November 17, 2012, Allegiant Air briefly operated Boeing 757-200 mainline jets from Santa Maria nonstop to Honolulu once a week until August 14, 2013. Allegiant also previously operated McDonnell Douglas MD-80 mainline jets on its nonstop flights to Las Vegas and Phoenix-Mesa Gateway Airport.

United Express operated by SkyWest Airlines was planning to resume service on September 30, 2021, with a daily flight to Denver as well as a daily flight to San Francisco. Both flights were planned to be operated with Bombardier CRJ100/200 regional jets. The service was scheduled to begin on June 4, 2020, but was postponed several times.

American Eagle began serving Santa Maria in October 2025 with daily flights to Phoenix–Sky Harbor. After 5 months at the airport, American Airlines discontinued service to Santa Maria on May 7, 2026.

== Facilities ==
The airport covers 2,516 acres (1,018 ha) and has two asphalt runways: 12/30, 8,004 x 150 ft (2,439 x 46 m) and 2/20, 5,189 x 75 ft (1,582 x 23 m).

In 2007 the airport had 62,480 aircraft operations, average 171 per day: 79% general aviation, 19% air taxi, 2% military and <1% airline. 243 aircraft are based at the airport: 83% single-engine, 7% multi-engine, 6% helicopter, 3% jet, <1% glider and <1% ultralight.

A new baggage claim facility opened in 2007. It was one of the first airports on the Central Coast to use a state of the art baggage carousel, on a small scale.

A new terminal holding room opened in February 2008. The old area had room for 30 passengers. Designed for the Allegiant Air flights, the new holding room accommodates 200 passengers and has room for a cafe.

A runway extension was completed on May 3, 2012, from 6,304 ft. to 8,004 ft. The extended runway at Santa Maria gives the airport the longest civil runway between Los Angeles and San Jose on the central coast (Bakersfield's primary runway at Meadows Field in the Central Valley (10855 x 150 ft.) and Vandenberg AFB's runway (15000 x 200 ft.) are longer).

RLC - "Above And Beyond" uses a fleet of Sikorsky S-76 helicopters to transport oil rig workers to Platform Irene, Platform Hidalgo, Platform Harvest and Platform Hermosa from its operating base next to Central Coast Jet Center in Santa Maria.

=== Aerial firefighting air tanker base ===
The Santa Maria Airport serves as an aerial firefighting air tanker base for the U.S. Forest Service as well as for state and local firefighting agencies in California. Aerial firefighting air tanker aircraft operating from the airport have included the McDonnell Douglas DC-10-30 wide body jet flown by 10 Tanker Air Carrier, the McDonnell Douglas MD-87 jet flown by Erickson Aero Tanker, the Lockheed C-130 Hercules turboprop and the Boeing 737-300 flown by Coulson Flying Tankers, and the Grumman S-2 Tracker (S-2T version) turboprop operated by the California Department of Forestry and Fire Protection (CAL FIRE).

== Airlines and destinations ==
=== Passenger ===
Airlines	Destinations
Allegiant Air	Las Vegas

=== Cargo ===
Airlines	Destinations
Ameriflight	Burbank
FedEx Feeder	Ontario

== Statistics ==
Busiest domestic routes from SMX (January 2025 – December 2025)
Rank	City	Passengers	Carriers
1	Las Vegas, Nevada	11,700	Allegiant
2	Phoenix, Arizona	4,700	American

=== Annual traffic ===
Annual passenger traffic at SMX
Year	Passengers	Year	Passengers	Year	Passengers
2016	78,000	2019	48,000	2022	31,000
2017	47,000	2020	31,000	2023	27,000
2018	45,000	2021	53,000	2024	26,000

== Ground transportation ==
The airport is located south of Santa Maria along Skyway Drive at Terminal Drive. Both US 101 and State Route 135 (Broadway) can be reached from the airport by heading north on Skyway Drive and then turning east onto Betteravia Road. Short and long-term parking is available, but passenger vehicles left more than 14 days must obtain prior approval by the Airport Administration.

The airport is served by Santa Maria Area Transit routes 4 and the Breeze, the Santa Maria Cab Company, Lyft, Uber, and other local services.

== Allan Hancock Field ==
The original Allan Hancock Field was established in 1927 at another location, between Jones Street to the north, Stowell Road to the south, Bradley Road to the east and Miller Street to the west. The airport housed the Allan Hancock College of Aeronautics operated by the Hancock Foundation of Aeronautics. Before World War II, it was one of eight civil training military aviation cadets. After the war the field was used by the University of Southern California for their four-year Aeronautics Degree program. In 1958 a bond was passed allowing Santa Maria Junior College to purchase the land, much of which would become the campus of what is now known as Allan Hancock College. The name of the original Santa Maria Airport and Hancock's name then transferred to the other, now public airport in town.

== See also ==
- California World War II Army Airfields
- 35th Flying Training Wing (World War II)
