= List of Fairchild Swearingen Metroliner operators =

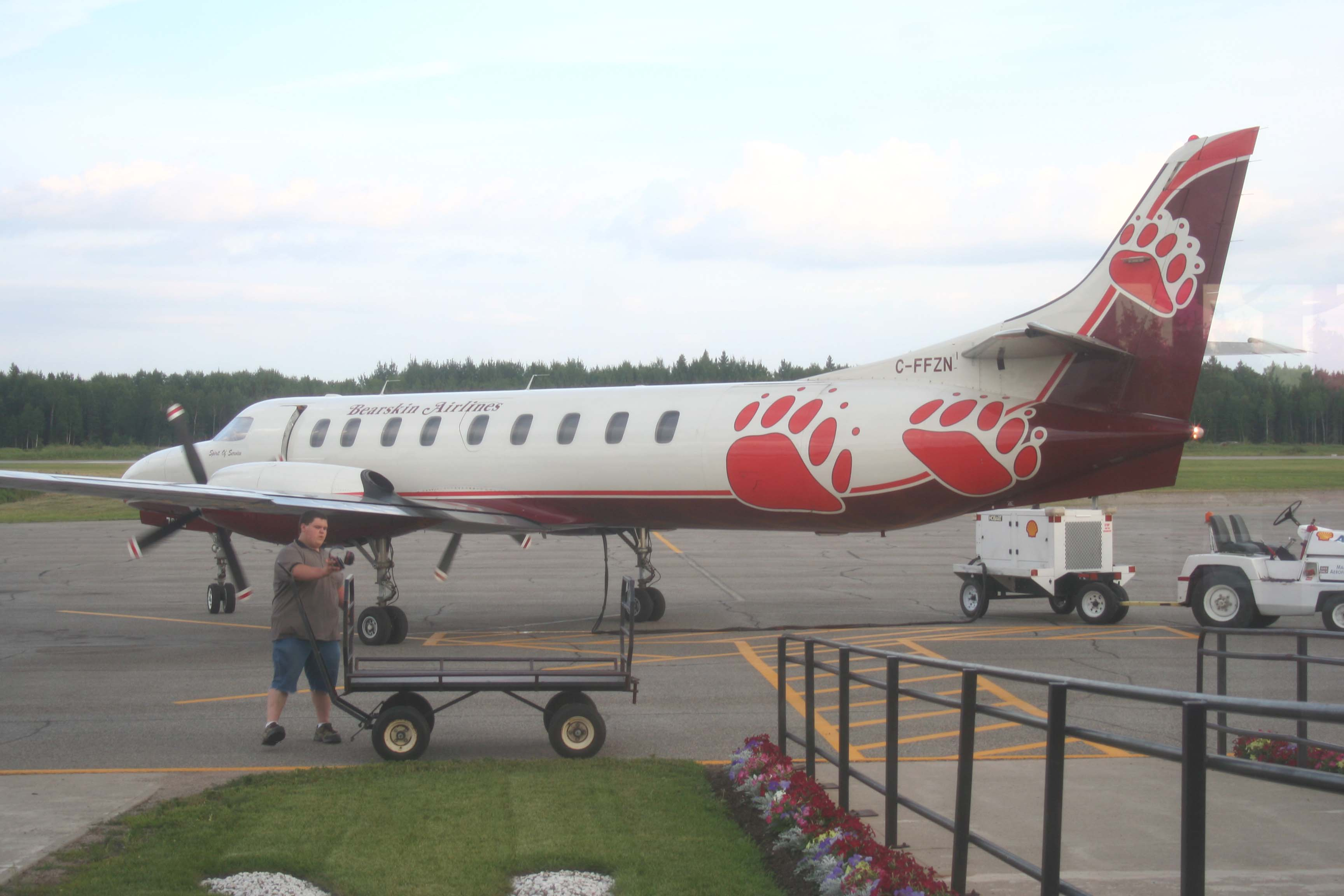
Bearskin Airlines C-FFZN SA227-AC Metroliner operating out of Red Lake, Ontario, c. 2007

In July 2016, 225 Fairchild Swearingen Metroliners were in airline service: 170 in Americas, 28 in Asia Pacific & Middle East and 27 in Europe. Its airline operators with six or more aircraft were :

- 30: Ameriflight
- 25: Aeronaves TSM
- 20: Key Lime Air
- 20: Perimeter Aviation
- 16: Bearskin Airlines
- 12: Encore Air Cargo
- 10: Sierra West Airlines
- 9: Bemidji Airlines
- 3: Berry Aviation
- 8: SkyCare Air Ambulance
- 7: Toll Priority
- 7: Sunwest Aviation
- 6: Sharp Airlines
- 5: Denver Air Connection

== Former and current Australian and New Zealand passenger airline operators ==
Australian Operators:

- Airnorth
- Australian airExpress
- Hardy Aviation
- Hazelton Airlines
- Kendell Airlines
- Link Airways (formerly known as Fly Corporate Air)
- MacAir Airlines
- Regional Express
- Sharp Airlines
- Skippers Aviation
- Toll

New Zealand operator:

- Air Chathams
- Air New Zealand Link

== Former U.S. and Canadian passenger airline operators ==
=== U.S. operators ===
A considerable number of commuter and regional air carriers previously operated Metro, Metro II, Metro III and/or Metro IV/Metro 23 aircraft primarily in scheduled passenger service in the U.S. and Canada. According to the Official Airline Guide (OAG), these airlines included:

- Air LA
- Air Link
- Air Midwest
- Air Oregon
- AirPac (Alaska-based air carrier)
- AirVantage Airlines
- Air Virginia (AVAir) (operated independently and also as American Eagle)
- Air Wisconsin
- Allegheny Commuter
- American Eagle
- Atlantic Express
- Atlantis Airlines
- Austin Express
- Big Sky Airlines
- Britt Airways
- California Air Shuttle
- Cascade Airways
- Cochise Airlines
- Comair (operated independently and later as Delta Connection)
- Commuter Airlines
- Conquest Airlines
- Continental Connection
- Delta Connection (operated by Comair and SkyWest Airlines)
- Denver Air Connection
- Empire Airlines (1976-1985) - acquired by Piedmont Airlines (1948-1989)
- Empire Airlines (based in Idaho)
- Freedom Airlines
- Gem State Airlines
- Golden Gate Airlines
- Horizon Air
- Imperial Airlines
- Inland Empire Airlines
- Landmark Aviation Air Cargo
- Lone Star Airlines
- Mesa Airlines
- Mesaba Airlines (operated as Northwest Airlink)
- Mid Continent Airlines (1980s - formerly AAA Airlines)
- Midstate Airlines
- Midway Connection (feeder service for Midway Airlines)
- Mississippi Valley Airlines (MVA)
- Northeast Express Regional Airlines
- Northwest Airlink
- Pacific Cal Air
- Peninsula Airlines (PenAir)
- Pioneer Airlines (1980s commuter air carrier)
- Resort Air (operated as Trans World Express)
- Rio Airways
- Scenic Airlines
- Scheduled Skyways (renamed Skyways)
- SkyWest Airlines (operated independently and later as Western Express and then Delta Connection)
- Sierra West Airlines
- Star Airways
- Sun Aire Lines
- Tejas Airlines
- Trans-Central Airlines
- Trans-Colorado Airlines (operated independently and also as Continental Connection)
- Transwestern Airlines
- Trans World Express (operated by Resort Air)
- Western Express (operated by SkyWest on behalf of Western Airlines)
- Wings West Airlines (initially operated independently and then as American Eagle)

Other small air carriers operated Metroliners as well.

In addition, Southern Airways, a local service airline that primarily operated McDonnell Douglas DC-9 jetliners before it merged with North Central Airlines to form Republic Airlines (1979-1986), operated the Metro II as a replacement aircraft type for its retired Martin 4-0-4 prop aircraft.

=== Canadian operators ===
In addition to current operators Bearskin Airlines and Perimeter Aviation, previous Metro operators in Canada included:

- Air Montreal
- Air Toronto
- Alta Flights
- Canadian Western Airlines
- Carson Air
- Jetall
- Intair
- Inter-Canadien
- Provincial Airlines
- Quebecair (Quebecair Inter commuter division)
- Skylink Airlines
- Skycare Air Ambulance
- Soundair
- Sunwest Aviation.
- Southwest Air
- Tempus Air

== Military operators ==
Colombia

- Colombian Air Force - 1 × Metro 23

Mexico

- Mexican Air Force - 4 × Metroliner III

Peru

- Peruvian Air Force - 3 × Metro 23

Trinidad and Tobago

- Trinidad and Tobago Air Guard (TTAG) - 2 × Metro 23

Venezuela

- Venezuelan Air Force - 2

Oman

- Royal Oman Police

== Former military operators ==
Argentina

- Argentine Air Force
- Argentine National Gendarmerie - At least one aircraft confiscated from drug smugglers operated in late 1990s

Australia. (Note: Several Metro IIs are used as training aids for instructing aircraft technicians serving in the Australian Defence Forces. They are owned by the RAAF but did not fly in ADF service)
South Africa

- South African Air Force
  - No. 21 Squadron SAAF

Sweden

- Swedish Air Force - 2 x Metro III and 1 x Metro-Merlin IVC

Thailand

- Royal Thai Air Force
