= San Luis Obispo County Regional Airport =

Regional airport serving the city of San Luis Obispo, California, United States

SLO County Airport

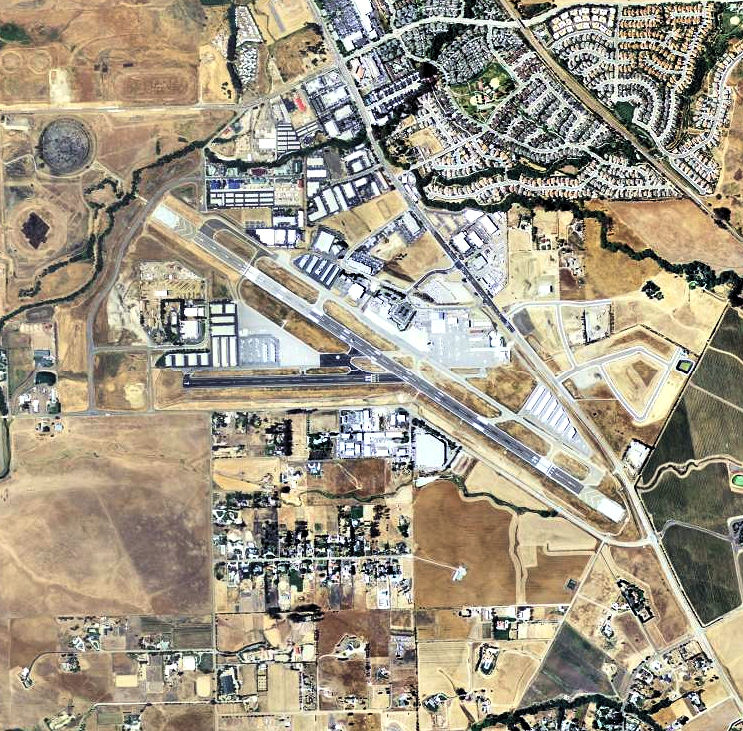
- 2006 USGS airphoto
- IATA: SBP; ICAO: KSBP; FAA LID: SBP

Summary
- Airport type: Public
- Operator: San Luis Obispo County
- Location: San Luis Obispo, California
- Elevation AMSL: 212 ft (65 m)
- Coordinates: 35°14′13″N 120°38′31″W
- Website: sloairport.com

Maps
- FAA airport diagram
- Interactive map of SLO County Airport

Runways
Direction	Length		Surface
Direction	ft	m	Surface
11/29	6,100	1,859	Asphalt
7/25	2,500	762	Asphalt

Statistics (2025)
- Total passengers: 811,905
- Aircraft operations: 72,268
- Source: San Luis Obispo County Regional Airport Statistics Reports

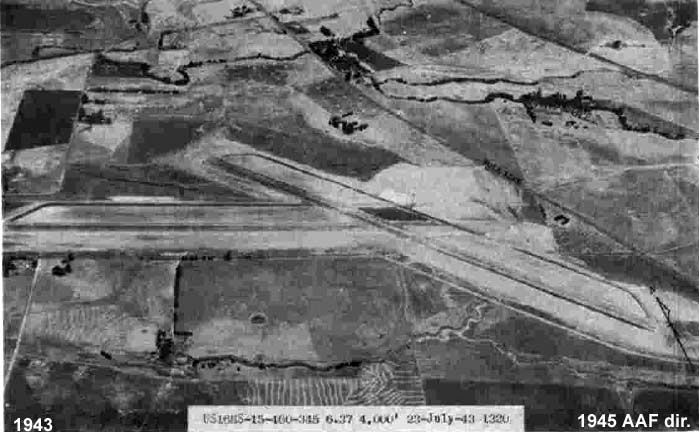
San Luis Obispo County Regional Airport, as Naval Auxiliary Air Station San Luis Obispo in 1943 in a US Army photo

San Luis Obispo County Regional Airport (IATA: SBP, ICAO: KSBP, FAA LID: SBP), McChesney Field is a civil airport near San Luis Obispo, California, United States. Five passenger airlines serve the airport. The airport was established in 1939 and used by the U.S. military between 1939 and 1945.

== History ==
In 1933 Pacific Seaboard Air Lines' single engine Bellanca CH-300s flew twice daily each way: Los Angeles - Santa Barbara - Santa Maria - San Luis Obispo - Paso Robles - Monterey - Salinas - San Jose - San Francisco. Pacific Seaboard later moved its operation to the eastern U.S., was renamed Chicago and Southern Air Lines, and became a large domestic and international airline that in 1953 was acquired by and merged into Delta Air Lines.

Earl Thomson, along with his brothers-in-law, William "Chris" and David Hoover, talked county officials into leasing them the land for an airport. By April 1939 it opened with an 88-by-100-foot (27 by 30 m) hangar and dirt runways.

During World War II the federal government took over the airport: From 1938 until 1941, the U.S. Army Air Corps and the California National Guard used 218 acres as an aerial observation training center; In 1940 the War Department added hard surface runways and lights, barracks, hangars, and mechanic shops. In 1940 and 1941, 183 private pilots and 20 advanced students were trained here though a federally sponsored Civilian Pilot Training Program for armed services fliers. In 1943, the Navy began using the airport as a training center for the Pacific Fleet, calling the airport Naval Outlying Field, San Luis Obispo and the Naval Auxiliary Air Station, San Luis Obispo.

The federal government turned the airport back to the county in 1946. Southwest Airways started passenger flights with Douglas DC-3s that year.

Southwest's flights to San Luis Obispo ended in 1956 when the airline moved to Paso Robles Municipal Airport in northern San Luis Obispo County due to the 4000-ft runway at San Luis Obispo being too short for larger aircraft such as the Martin 4-0-4 and Fairchild F-27. Pacific Air Lines, Air West and Hughes Airwest, successors to Southwest Airways, listed San Luis Obispo in their timetables but actually served Paso Robles with F-27s until 1974.

In 1947 county supervisors contracted for another hangar, ramp, and eventually an administration building. The supervisors named Chris Hoover full-time airport manager in 1953.

San Luis Obispo Airport had no scheduled airline service from 1956 until 1969 when locally based Swift Aire Lines began scheduled flights with Piper Navajos. Swift Aire's headquarters were at San Luis Obispo; it eventually operated Fokker F27 Friendships bought new from Fokker as well as Nord 262s and de Havilland Herons.

In 1975, after ending service to Paso Robles the year before, Hughes Airwest was operating McDonnell Douglas DC-9-30s to nearby Santa Maria Public Airport to serve the San Luis Obispo area; these nonstops to Los Angeles and San Francisco soon ended.

After the 1981 demise of Swift Aire after a merger with Golden Gate Airlines, Wings West Airlines established its headquarters in San Luis Obispo and flew several turboprop types, as an independent commuter carrier and then as American Eagle on behalf of American Airlines via a code sharing agreement. Propjets flown by Wings West to San Luis Obispo included the British Aerospace BAe Jetstream 31 and Jetstream 32, the Beechcraft C99, the Fairchild Swearingen Metroliner (Metro III models) and the Saab 340.

In 1987 the San Luis Obispo County Regional Airport was dedicated as McChesney Field, in honor of Leroy E. McChesney for his leadership and dedication to aviation. McChesney lived in the county since 1920 and had been a pilot since 1949. He was a longtime member of the California Aviation Council, a member of the California Aeronautics Board, and the Grand Marshal of the first Airport Day in 1984.

In 1988 a Federal Aviation Administration (FAA) control tower opened and SkyWest Airlines, WestAir operating as United Express and Wings West (later merged into American Eagle) were flying commuter turboprops, WestAir operating the Embraer EMB-110 Bandeirante and later the BAe Jetstream 31.

Several other commuter airlines served San Luis Obispo with turboprop flights to Los Angeles (LAX) including Delta Connection service by SkyWest with Fairchild Swearingen Metroliners (Metro II and Metro III models) and Embraer EMB-120 Brasilias, Imperial Airlines with Embraer EMB-110 Bandeirantes, Mesa Airlines flying as United Express with Beechcraft 1900Cs and USAir Express operated by Trans States Airlines with BAe Jetstream 32s. As of 1996 only American Eagle and United Express remained, Delta Connection and US Air Express having left the year prior.

America West Express (Mesa Airlines) began flying de Havilland Canada DHC-8 Dash 8s to Phoenix in April 1999. Within a few years they had expanded to Las Vegas, and became the first airline to operate regional jets to the airport with the Canadair CRJ-200. The Las Vegas route was dropped shortly after the US Airways/America West merger.

In 2007, Delta Connection (Skywest) returned to San Luis Obispo, flying a CRJ-200 to Salt Lake City. The route ended in 2008. American Eagle left the airport in November 2008 as they retired their Saab 340s as part of a 12% reduction in services, and closed its base at the airport.

On August 27, 2008, US Airways Express flown by Mesa Airlines announced an expansion of service at San Luis Obispo. Beginning on October 2, 2008, the Bombardier Canadair Regional Jet 900 (CRJ-900) replaced the smaller CRJ-200 on the Phoenix flights with 36 more seats on these twice-daily flights, and continues today as American Eagle service. SkyWest (United Express) now has Canadair CRJ-200s on most nonstops to Los Angeles, San Francisco, and Denver with a planned change to larger Embraer ERJ-175 regional jets for one daily flight each to Los Angeles and San Francisco, and all flights to Denver. United Airlines has now added mainline Airbus A319 jet service nonstop between Denver and the airport. Allegiant Air considered the airport for nonstop McDonnell Douglas MD-80 jet service to Las Vegas, but the short runway at the time at SBP resulted in their flights being operated from the Santa Maria Airport.

In January 2009, a charter Alaska Airlines Boeing 737-400 arrived at SBP from Chico and was the largest aircraft ever to land at San Luis. The flight carried 125 members of the San Francisco Symphony arriving to perform at Cal Poly's Performing Arts Center. From April 1 to 4, 2009 charter Alaska Airlines Boeing 737-700s, Frontier Airlines Airbus A319s, and Southwest Airlines Boeing 737s arrived at San Luis Obispo County carrying Oregon National Guard military troops. The mainline A319 operated by both American Airlines and United Airlines is currently the largest jet aircraft type to serve San Luis Obispo in scheduled passenger service. Currently, there are no military charter operations at San Luis Obispo; however, C-130 Hercules aircraft do occasionally stop at the airport. Allegiant Air has operated charters from the airport for the Cal Poly Football team.

In October 2015, ground was broken on a new passenger terminal; it was expected that increases in the regional population and tourism would attract more service to the airport.

On April 13, 2017, Alaska Airlines (Horizon Air) began a daily Embraer ERJ-175 jet service to Seattle. Alaska Airlines is currently operating mainline Boeing 737-800 jetliners nonstop between San Luis Obispo and Seattle.

On December 13, 2018, American Airlines announced daily nonstop flights to Dallas/Fort Worth which began on April 2, 2019. The flights were being operated with American Eagle CRJ-700 and Embraer E-175 regional jets and are currently being operated with mainline Boeing 737-800 jetliners.

On June 26, 2019, Contour Airlines announced flights to Las Vegas which began October 17, 2019 with Embraer ERJ-135s. In March 2020, due to COVID-19, the airline ended service to the airport.

On September 4, 2019, Alaska Airlines announced daily flights with the ERJ-175 to Portland, Oregon (starting on June 17, 2021), and San Diego.

== Environmental contamination ==
In 2015, the airport was suspected as a possible source of trichloroethylene or TCE, which was found in nearby water wells. However, an investigation ordered by the Central Coast Regional Water Quality Control Board and conducted by a third-party engineering firm found that the airport was not the source of contamination. Water Board staff oversaw the county's field investigation activities. An estimated 48 residents had already filed claims against the county for negligence, even though the investigation concluded that the San Luis Obispo Regional Airport was not the source.

In 2019, the Central Coast Regional Water Quality Control Board confirmed that the source of TCE contamination in the Buckley Road Area was emanating from 4665 Thread Lane, which is located across Buckley Road from the airport.

== Facilities ==
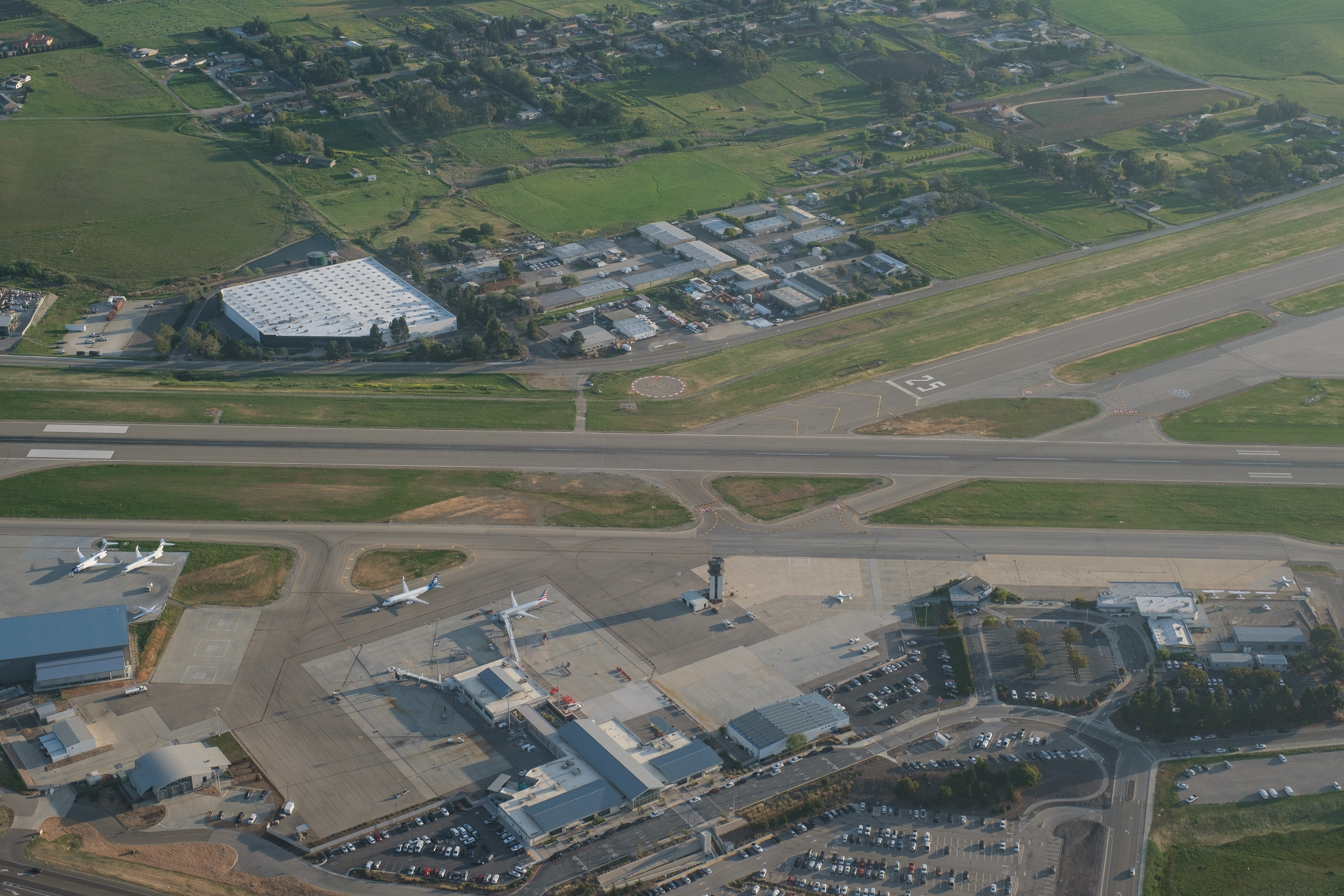
View of San Luis Obispo Airport with the new terminal on the left and the old terminal on the right

The airport covers 340 acres (138 ha) and has two runways:

- 11/29: 6,100 x 150 ft (1,859 x 46 m): asphalt
- 7/25: 2,500 x 100 ft (762 x 30 m): asphalt

A new passenger terminal replaced the older, smaller facility towards the north end of the airfield. A ground-breaking ceremony was held on October 8, 2015, and opened on November 1, 2017. The new terminal features modern check-in counters and security screening, a pet relief area in a central courtyard, a post-security food stand, multiple gates with waiting areas, and two all-glass jet bridges in addition to the ground level gates. Artwork in the lobby includes tail sections and an engine nacelle from a Boeing 747. The airport is designed to accommodate up to 1.2 million passengers per year, well above the 450,000 seen by the airport at the time of construction.

The airport also has the Spirit of San Luis Restaurant, in the original terminal from the 1950s. It has outdoor seating for patrons to watch planes take off and land, and is popular with private pilots to fly in for "$100 hamburgers".

The 1980s built terminal covers 16,000 square feet, and is currently home to a flight school.

There are numerous parking spots for general aviation aircraft, and multiple FBOs, including Air San Luis and ACI Jet Center, as well as aircraft rentals and flight schools.

== Airlines and destinations ==
=== Passenger ===
Airlines	Destinations	Refs
Alaska Airlines	Portland (OR), San Diego, Seattle/Tacoma	
American Airlines	Dallas/Fort Worth; Seasonal: Phoenix–Sky Harbor	
American Eagle	Phoenix–Sky Harbor	
United Airlines	Denver, San Francisco	
United Express	Denver, Los Angeles, San Francisco	

=== Cargo ===
Airlines	Destinations
Ameriflight	Burbank, Santa Barbara
FedEx Feeder operated by West Air	Ontario

- Ameriflight for UPS
- West Air Inc. for FedEx Express

Destinations map
Destinations from San Luis Obispo County Regional Airport
Red = Year-round destination
Blue = Future destination

On July 17, 2013, US Airways Express operated by Mesa Airlines resumed Bombardier Canadair Regional Jet 900 (CRJ-900) nonstop service to San Luis Obispo from Phoenix. US Airways was then merged into American Airlines and these nonstop flights are now operated by American Airlines mainline jets in addition to American Eagle regional jets flown by both Envoy Air and SkyWest Airlines.

On April 7, 2015, SkyWest Airlines operating as United Express began flying Canadair CRJ-200s on all flights to Los Angeles and San Francisco, replacing Embraer EMB-120 Brasilias as they moved the type into retirement, so all scheduled passenger airline flights at San Luis Obispo are now operated with regional jets for the first time. The daily flights to Denver, as well as two of the flights to Los Angeles and one flight to San Francisco, are operated with the Embraer 175 regional jet.

Alaska Airlines announced new nonstop service between Seattle and San Luis Obispo which began on April 13, 2017, and was originally flown by SkyWest Airlines with Embraer 175s. Alaska Airlines subsidiary Horizon Air took over this code share service on June 9, 2017. On June 17, 2021, the airline launched nonstop flights to San Diego and Portland, Oregon. Alaska Airlines currently operates mainline Boeing 737-800 jetliners nonstop between San Luis Obispo and Seattle.

Delta briefly operated a CRJ-200 between San Luis Obispo and Salt Lake City International Airport between 2007 and 2008, until shelving the flights due to the national recession.

American Airlines is currently operating mainline Boeing 737-800 jetliners on nonstop service between San Luis Obispo and its hub in Dallas/Fort Worth while both American and its affiliate American Eagle operate nonstop services between the airport and Phoenix–Sky Harbor with mainline service being flown with Airbus A319 jets and American Eagle flights being operated by both Envoy Air with Embraer 175 regional jets and SkyWest Airlines with Canadair CRJ-700 regional jets.

== Statistics ==
=== Top destinations ===
Busiest domestic routes from SBP (January 2025 – December 2025)
Rank	City	Passengers	Carriers
1	Phoenix—Sky Harbor, Arizona	90,570	American
2	Denver, Colorado	64,250	United
3	San Francisco, California	58,040	United
4	Dallas/Fort Worth, Texas	45,200	American
5	Seattle/Tacoma, Washington	40,070	Alaska
6	San Diego, California	38,740	Alaska
7	Los Angeles, California	32,240	United
8	Portland, Oregon	18,630	Alaska
9	Las Vegas, Nevada	10,020	Alaska

=== Airline market share ===
Largest airlines at SBP (January 2025 – December 2025)
Rank	Airline	Passengers	Share
1	SkyWest	380,000	48.15%
2	American Airlines	171,000	21.70%
3	Alaska Airlines	82,150	10.40%
4	United Airlines	77,310	9.79%
5	Envoy Air	46,480	5.88%
	Other	32,290	4.09%

=== Annual traffic ===
Annual passenger traffic at SBP (enplaned + deplaned) 1998 through 2023
Year	Passengers	Change
1998	298,279	-
1999	310,571	▲4.12%
2000	311,041	▲0.15%
2001	310,076	▼0.31%
2002	307,132	▼0.95%
2003	295,076	▼3.93%
2004	321,278	▲8.88%
2005	358,428	▲11.6%
2006	354,998	▼0.96%
2007	368,423	▲3.78%
2008	312,172	▼15.3%
2009	241,061	▼22.8%
2010	264,732	▲9.82%
2011	272,420	▲2.90%
2012	259,505	▼4.74%
2013	272,268	▲4.92%
2014	302,652	▲11.2%
2015	292,462	▼3.37%
2016	330,231	▲12.9%
2017	407,646	▲23.4%
2018	485,911	▲19.2%
2019	544,575	▲12.1%
2020	269,491	▼49.5%
2021	406,230	▲50.7%
2022	553,425	▲36.2%
2023	660,745	▲19.4%
2024	746,764	▲13.0%
2025	811,905	▲8.7%

== Fixed-base operators ==
- ACI Jet offers a complete aircraft management program, which eliminates the frustrations and hassles involved with owning one's own aircraft.
- Air San Luis is a local Cessna parts dealer and maintenance shop.
- SunWest Aviation was founded in 1987 as a family operation providing flight management services, and has grown to become an executive air charter specialist, aircraft rental service, flight school, and maintenance shop. SunWest Aviation closed in 2024.
- Aerocademy was founded in 2007 to give future and current SLO area pilots a place to further their aviation education. Aerocademy closed in 2023.
- AKS Aviation was founded in 2024 and offers flight instruction and aircraft rental.

== Ground transportation ==
The airport is located along Broad Street (State Route 227) at Aero Drive, southeast of Downtown San Luis Obispo. Parking is available across four parking lots within walking distance of the terminal. Parking is charged either hourly or daily; there are no separate long-term, short-term, or economy parking lots like many other major airports.

SLO Transit is the public transportation system that serves the airport. Taxis, Lyft, and Uber also provide service.

== Accidents ==
- August 24, 1984 - Wings West Airlines Flight 628 had a midair collision. Shortly after departing the San Luis Obispo County Regional Airport on a commuter flight to San Francisco International Airport, a Wings West Airlines twin-engine Beechcraft C99 (N6399U) collided head-on with a private Rockwell Commander 112TC aircraft (N112SM) that was descending for a landing at the same airport.
- August 1, 2005 - A Piper Cherokee flew into the side of Islay Hill shortly after takeoff in dense fog. The newly licensed pilot was not instrument rated and was killed in the crash. A fire on top of the hill burned 1/8th of an acre before being contained. The 700 foot tall Islay Hill lies 1 mile east of the airport boundary, but a red warning beacon was removed many years before the accident and has never been replaced.
- January 8, 2009 - A Beechcraft Bonanza (BE36-A36) landed with its gear up causing runway 29/11 to be closed for about an hour. The pilot was the only person aboard and was not injured. The runway closure caused a SkyWest flight from San Francisco to divert to Southern California.
- March 17, 2009 - At 3:00pm a Piper Comanche (PA-24) missed the runway on landing, apparently catching a wind gust. The wind caused the aircraft to veer off the runway, down a grass side embankment and through a fence. The incident caused the runway to be closed for 10 to 15 minutes but no aircraft were delayed. The one occupant of the aircraft, the pilot, was not injured.
- June 24, 2013 - A Cessna Skymaster crashed into a FedEx truck and a building about 1.5 miles northwest of the airport after takeoff, killing the pilot. The pilot had reportedly made a mayday call shortly before the crash.
- December 15, 2015 - A Cessna 210 landed with its gear up and caused the closure of runway 29/11. There were no injuries to any of the three passengers, and the runway was reopened the same day. It is unknown why the landing gear failed to extend.
- February 6, 2018 - An Ameriflight Fairchild Metroliner experienced a runway excursion without injury. There were minor delays for commercial flights.

== See also ==
- California World War II Army Airfields
