= Air Pacific =

Air Pacific may refer to:

- Air Pacific (United States)
- Fiji Airways, traded as Air Pacific until 2012
