= Imre E. Quastler =

American geographer

Imre E. Quastler (born December 26, 1940) is an American historical transportation geographer and an authority on aspects of regional transportation systems in the United States. He is Emeritus Professor of Geography in the Department of Geography at San Diego State University. He writes professionally under the name I. E. Quastler.

== Early life ==
In mid-1939, Quastler's parents and sister moved from Germany to Japan, taking one of the last passenger ships that left an Italian port for East Asia before World War II broke out. They were among those fleeing Germany as non-Aryans were being forced out of their jobs and some were being sent off to concentration camps. Before departing Germany, Quastler's father had found a job with a German engineering company in Japan.

Quastler was born in Tokyo on December 26, 1940. As the Allies advanced on Japan in 1944, Quastler and his mother and sister were relocated to the mountain village of Karuizawa, about 80 miles west of Tokyo, which served as a detention area for foreigners. His father, employed in the war industry, remained in Tokyo. After the war, Quastler's father worked for the American occupation administration. The family relocated to the United States in 1951, eventually settling in Detroit where Quastler's father began a new career with Excello Corporation and eventually with General Motors.

== Education and career ==
Quastler obtained a B.A. degree from Wayne State University in Detroit in 1962. He earned an M.A. degree from Northwestern University in 1964, where he studied under William Garrison, a transportation geographer and a leader of the "quantitative revolution" that swept geography and other fields in the mid-twentieth century. While at Northwestern, he began specializing in transportation geography, but of the non-quantitative variety. In 1971, he received his Ph.D. in geography from the University of Kansas, writing a dissertation on an historical geography topic.

While in the doctoral program at the University of Kansas, Quastler found that the history of railroad networks was under-studied, leaving an important part of the nation's economy poorly understood in terms of operations, equipment, and network expansion and contraction. Research eventually led to publication of The Railroads of Lawrence, Kansas, 1854-1900 in 1979, followed by eight other books on railroad historical geography.

Quastler joined the faculty of San Diego State University in 1968, remaining there until his retirement in 2002. Over the course of his academic career, he developed undergraduate and graduate level courses in transportation, urban and historical geography. His research interests included the history and development of both regional railroads and commuter (regional) airlines. Since his retirement he has continued writing and publishing on those subjects.

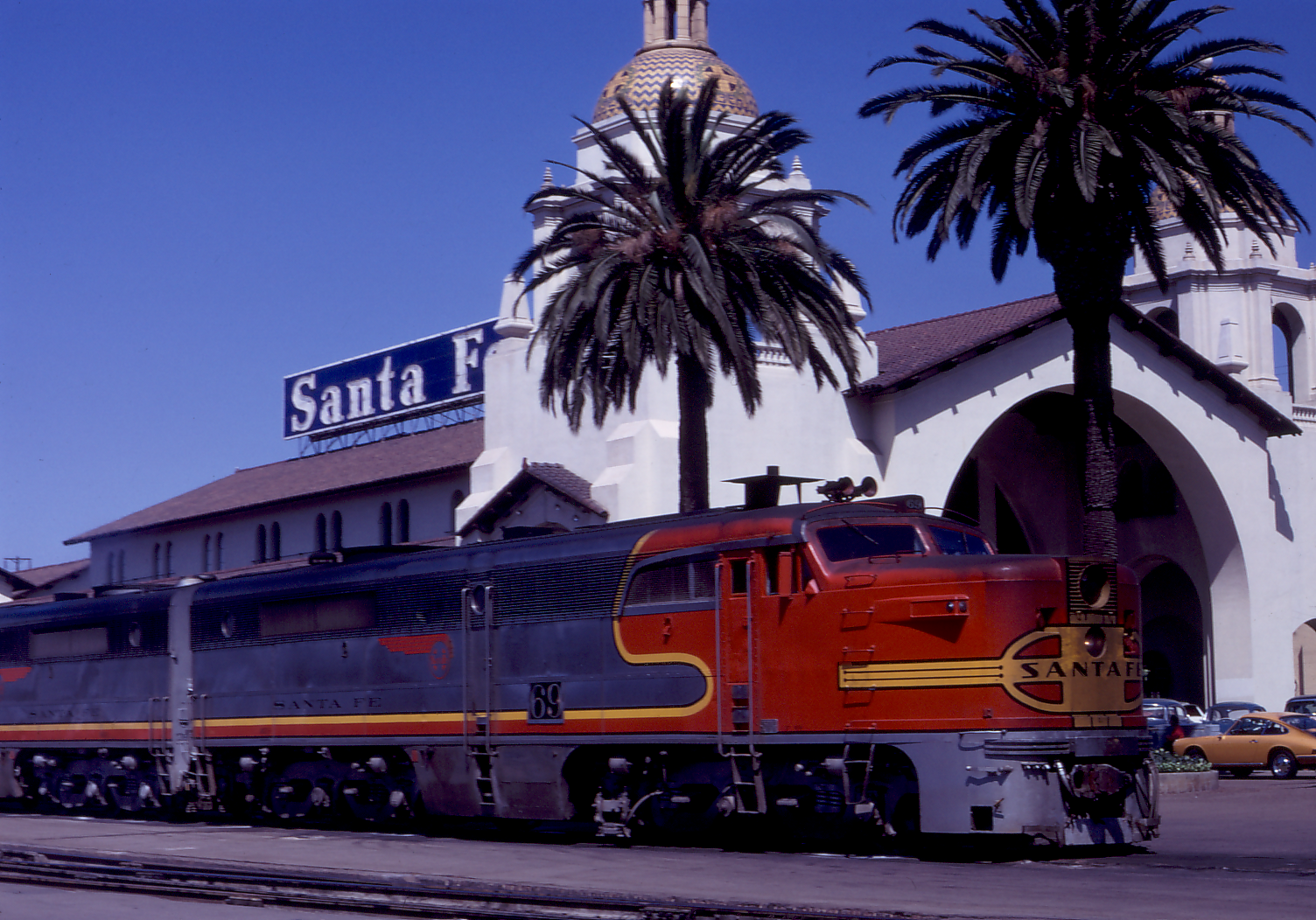
Atchison, Topeka, and Santa Fe Train upon Arrival in San Diego, 1967

Quastler was a popular teacher who mentored many students over the course of his career. He received the Outstanding Teacher Award at San Diego State University in 1987, and he was twice selected as Exemplary Academic Advisor at the university.

== Contribution to historical transportation geography ==
Quastler is one of the few academic geographers to extensively study the historical development of railroad and airline transportation networks. Much of the work in the field has been accomplished by non-academic writers and railroad or airline aficionados. Quastler's career has centered on documentation of the development and operation of regional transportation systems, an area generally without rigorous academic work. Besides writing about those forms of transportation, he also photographed them for historical purposes, starting in the late 1950s. He has photographed hundreds of railroads and airlines, producing one of the largest collection of images of this type from the late 1960s to the present. Additionally, he has mapped the networks of the railroads and airlines he has studied, illustrating and explaining their changes over time. In 2010 San Diego Aerospace Museum scanned 355 images from among of his extensive collection of airliner slides, making them available to the public through Flicker.

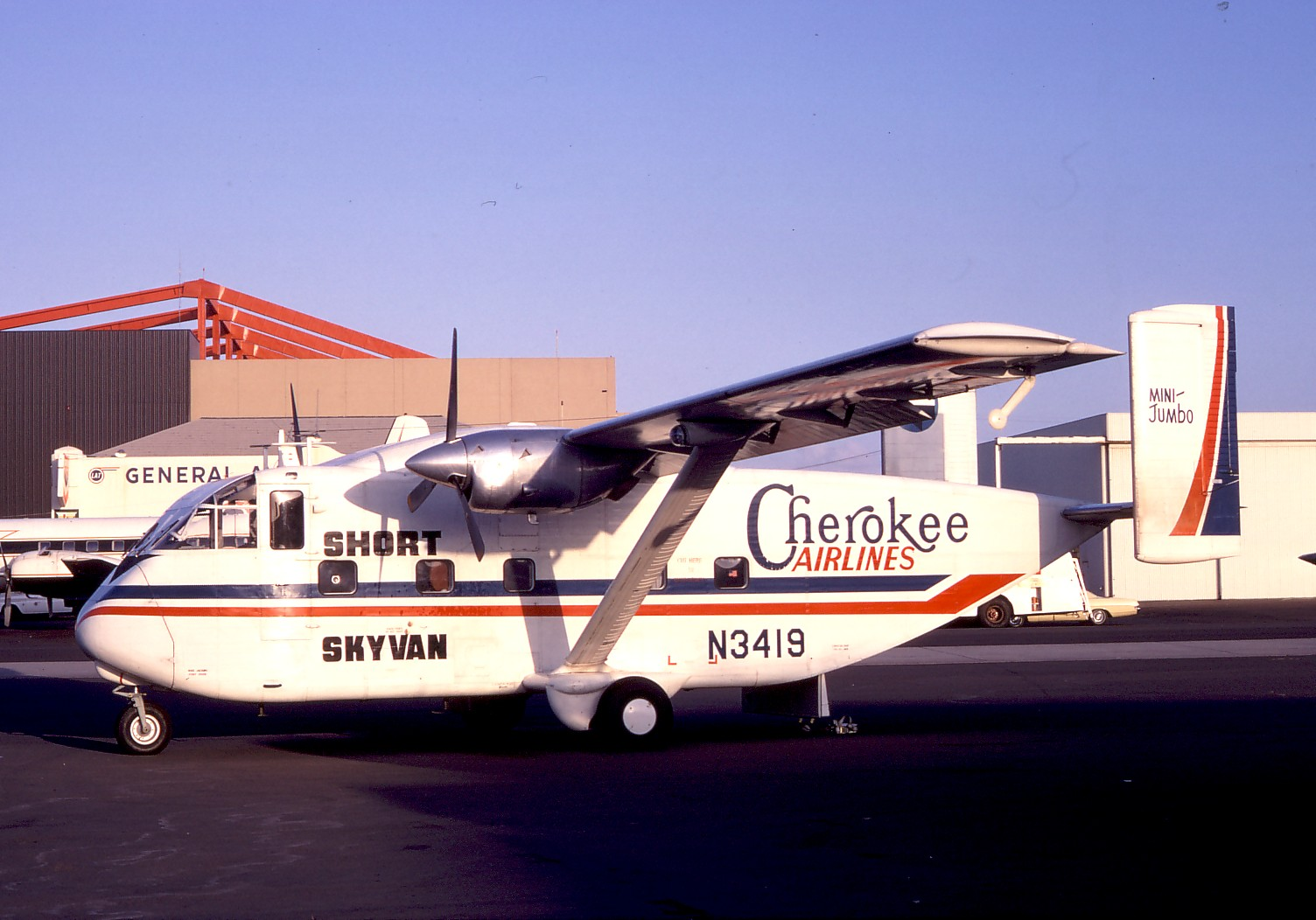
Cherokee Airline Skyvan N3419 in San Diego, 1969

Quastler's study of regional transportation systems expanded to include commuter and regional airlines in 1968, shortly after he arrived at San Diego State College (later San Diego State University). His first book documented the rise of Swift Aire Lines, which at the time served such cities as San Luis Obispo, Santa Maria, Los Angeles, San Francisco and Sacramento. This was the first in depth study of such airlines. During the 1970s and 1980s, Quastler documented the rise of several other commuter and regional airline networks, including Air Midwest and Scheduled Skyways. Quastler is currently conducting research for a book about the history and historical geography of Pacific Southwest Airlines, the California firm that was one of the most successful intrastate airlines in the history of the industry.

In 1994, Quastler completed Commuter Airlines of the United States, co-authored with R. E. G. Davies (1921–2011), a well-known writer of airline history. The book was sponsored and published by the Smithsonian Institution, and it remains the only comprehensive history written on the commuter airline industry.

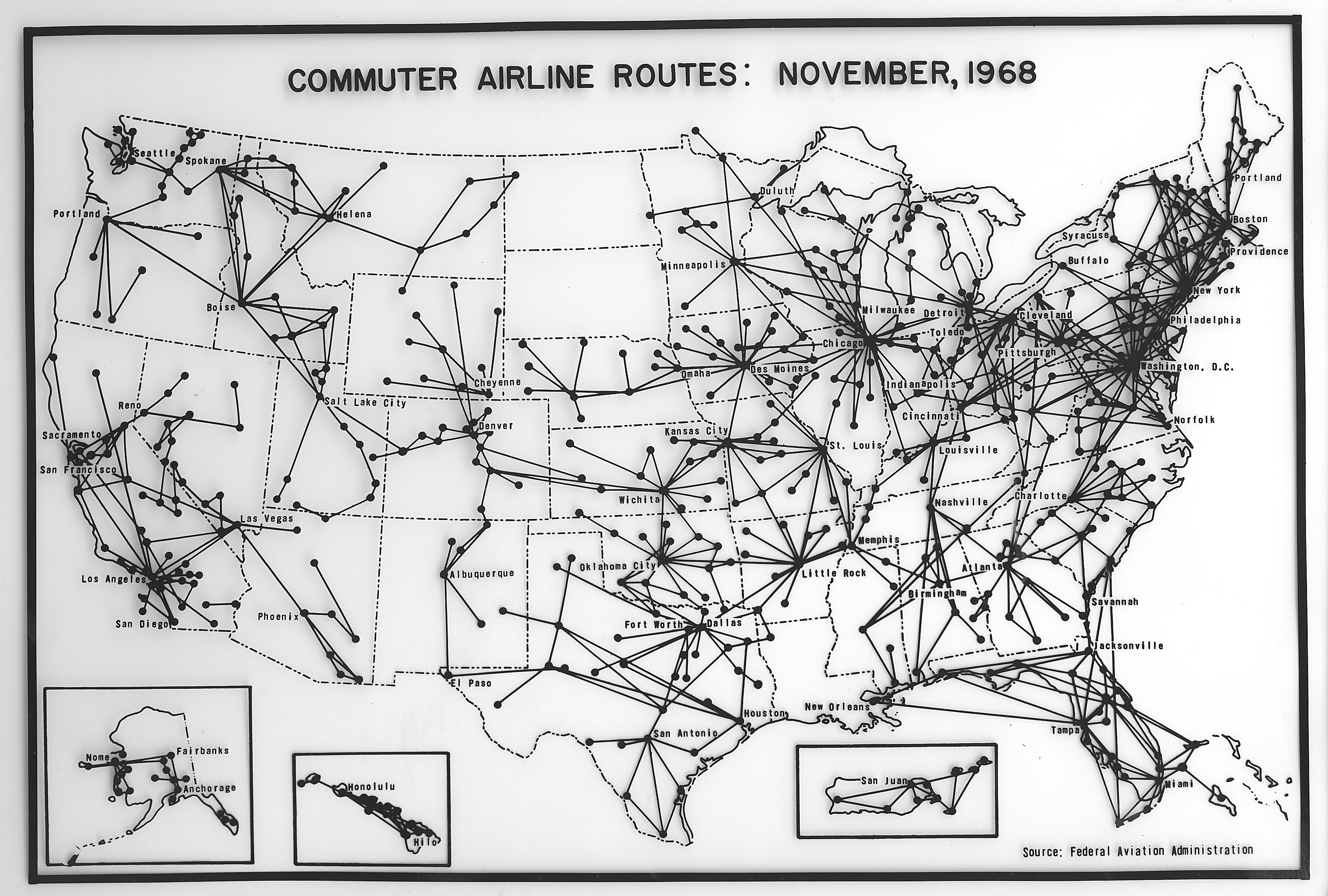
U. S. Commuter Airline Network in 1968

== Publications ==
Imre E. Quastler has published seventeen books and monographs and he has written twenty professional articles, reviews, and book chapters. Among his articles, he feels that those published by the journal Kansas History are his most important. Quastler's latest book is Unusual Airlines and Airliners: A Photo Journal. The author describes the book as consisting “primarily of more than 200 unusual airline and airliner photos taken by the author since 1969. The subjects range from commuter airliners, often photographed at unusual locations, to jumbo jets. They also range from airlines and services that lasted only a matter of months, to those of longer standing but which are probably unfamiliar to the average reader, whether in the United States, Canada, or elsewhere. Short essays describe the content and setting of each photograph.”

- Unusual Airlines and Airliners: A Photo Journal. San Diego, CA,: R&I Publishing, 2017.
- The Town that Loved Katy: Parsons, Kansas, and the M-K-T Railroad, with James J. Reisdorff. David City, NE: South Platte Press, 2012.
- Remembering the Grand Trunk Western: A Photographic Look At Its Last Decades, with C. P. Whipp. San Diego, CA,: R&I Publishing, 2010.
- Grand Trunk Western Railroad: An Illustrated History. San Diego, CA, R&I Publishing, 2009.
- Rock Island Lines in Focus: The Railroad Photographs (1898-1925) of Jules A. Bourquin. Dallas, Texas, DeGolyer Library and San Diego, CA: R&I Publishing, 2007.
- Where the Rails Cross: A Railroad History of Durand, Michigan. San Diego: R&I Press, 2005.
- Prairie Railroad Town: The Rock Island Railroad Shops at Horton, Kansas. David City, NE: South Platte Press, 2003.
- Editor (with Arthur and Judy Getis). The United States and Canada: The Land and the People, 2nd edition. Dubuque, IA: McGraw-Hill, 2000.
- Union Pacific West from Leavenworth. David City, NE: South Platte Press, 1999.
- Kansas Central Narrow Gauge. David City, NE: South Platte Press, 1999.
- Missouri Pacific Northwest: A History of the Kansas City Northwestern Railroad. David City, NE: South Platte Press, 1994.
- Commuter Airlines of the United States, with R.E.G. Davies Washington, DC: Smithsonian Institution Press, 1994.
- Air Midwest: The First Twenty Years. San Diego; Airline Press of California, 1985.
- Pioneer of the Third Level: A History of Air Midwest. (San Diego: Commuter Airlines Press, 1980.
- Swift Aire Lines, 1969-1979: The History of an American Commuter Airline. San Diego: Commuter Airlines Press, 1979.
- The Railroads of Lawrence, Kansas, 1854-1900: A Case Study in the Causes and Consequences of an Unsuccessful American Urban Railroad Program. Lawrence: Coronado Press, 1979.
- Editor, Geographic Perspectives in the Future of American Railroads. San Diego: Department of Geography, Occasional Publications No. 1, 1973. Papers by Harold M. Mayer, William Wallace, Ronald Hatchett and Richard Francaviglia.
