= Westair de Mexico =

Westair de México S.A de C.V. was a Mexican airline that operated cargo flights on behalf of FedEx Express.

== History ==
Westair de México was established in 1957 (69 years ago) as Transportes Aéreos del Centro de México (TACMSA), but several technical problems delayed the start of operations to August 1978, operating with two Cessna 404, a Cessna 152 and a Fuji FA200. In May 1987, TACMSA declared the end of their service, leaving their planes grounded in Toluca airport, their hub base; the airline remained inactive for more than three years, until July 1990 when it was acquired and rescued by the U.S airline West Air. It was renamed Westair de México and restarted service with two Fairchild Metroliner, and although one Cessna 404 was kept it was used only as a crew trainer; the airline operated West Air flights (on behalf of FedEx) between Mexico City (their new hub from March 1991) and San Diego, receiving one additional Metroliner and one Cessna 441 in August 1995; three of the Metroliners were painted in FedEx livery.

On 16 March 2003, Westair de México filed for bankruptcy, although it still operated night-time cargo flights between Mexico City and Cancun (10:30 P.M - 3:16 A.M, 8:45 P.M - 10:28 P.M) with one of their aircraft from March 18, 2003; the airline's operation effectively ceased when their last airworthy aircraft crashed in Mexico City due to heavy fog and their grounded aircraft were returned to the lessor; West Air retired the certificate of Westair de México in May 2003 (23 years ago), and only FedEx operates flights between San Diego and Mexico City.

== Fleet ==
=== Upon the closure ===
- 3 Fairchild Metroliner Cargo Version (3 tons capability, painted with FedEx scheme)
- 1 Fairchild Metroliner Passenger Version (26 seats, painted in white scheme)
- 1 Cessna 404 (used only as crew trainer)
- 1 Cessna 441 (used only as crew trainer)

=== Historic ===
- 1 Cessna 152
- 1 Cessna 404
- 1 Fuji FA200 (used only as crew trainer)

== See also ==
- West Air (the parent company of Westair de México)
