= Air Pacific (United States) =

American commuter airline, 1979–1981

- Commenced operations: 1970; 56 years ago (as Eureka Aero)
- Ceased operations: 1981; 45 years ago
- Fleet size: ?
- Destinations: See below
- Headquarters: Oakland; International Airport, Oakland, California

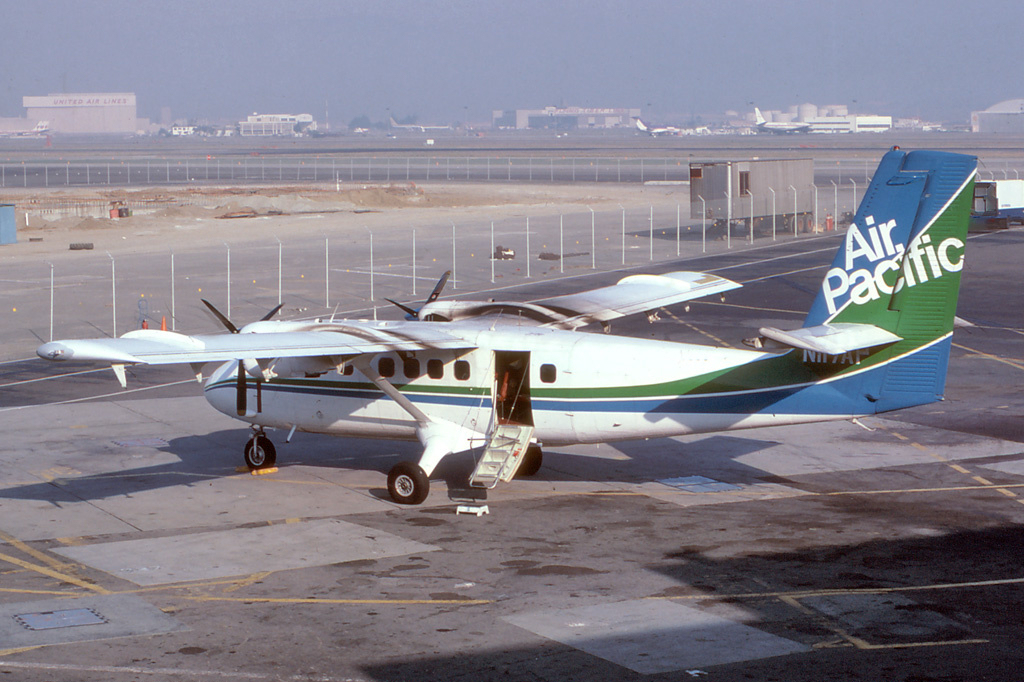
Air Pacific DHC-6 Twin Otter

Air Pacific was a commuter airline based in the United States that operated regional flights wholly within the state of California. Founded as Eureka Aero in 1970, it was renamed Air Pacific in 1979. Its de Havilland Canada DHC-6 Twin Otter and DHC-7 Dash 7 turboprop aircraft were capable of STOL (short takeoff and landing) operations.

Air Pacific merged with Gem State Airlines in 1980 to form Golden Gate Airlines, which merged again in 1981 with Swift Aire Lines, but service was discontinued shortly thereafter.

== Destinations ==
Air Pacific served the following destinations in California during its existence, with some of these destinations being served at different times:

- Bakersfield, California (BFL)
- Chico, California (CIC)
- Los Angeles, California (LAX)
- Merced, California (MCE)
- Modesto, California (MOD)
- Oakland, California (OAK)
- Redding, California (RDD)
- Sacramento, California (SMF)
- San Francisco, California (SFO)
- Santa Rosa, California (STS)
- South Lake Tahoe, California (TVL)
- Stockton, California (SCK)

== Historical fleet ==
- de Havilland Canada DHC-6 Twin Otter
- de Havilland Canada DHC-7 Dash 7

== See also ==
- List of defunct airlines of the United States
