= Gem State Airlines =

United States airline

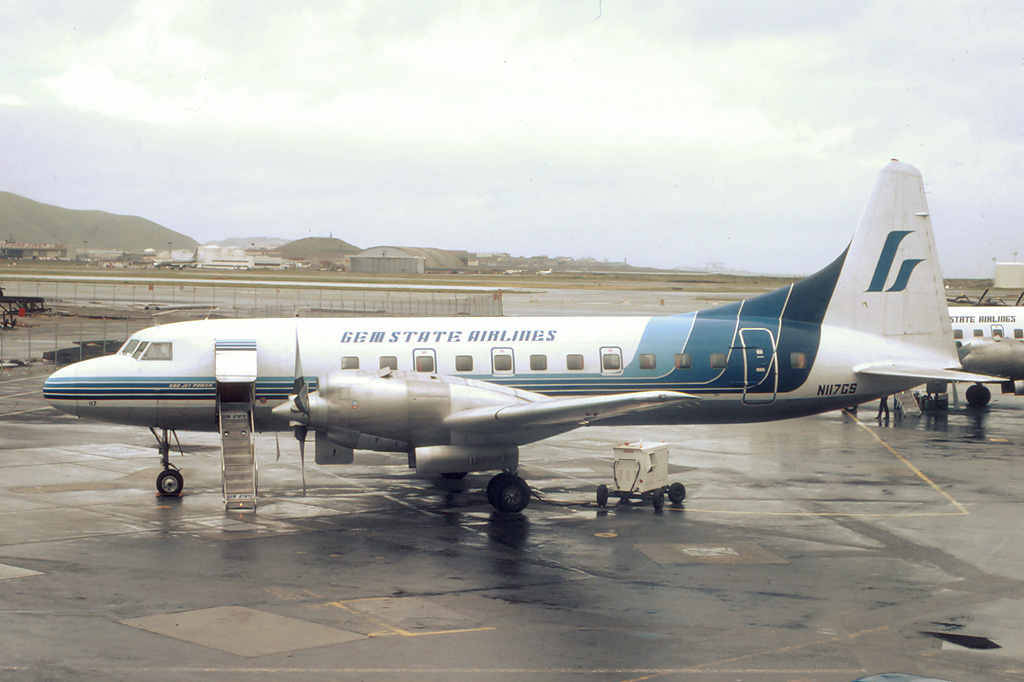
- Convair 580 in 1980
IATA	ICAO	Call sign
GS	–	–
- Founded: 1978; 48 years ago
- Ceased operations: 1980; 46 years ago
- Focus cities: Boise, Idaho, Coeur d'Alene, Idaho
- Fleet size: 9
- Destinations: 12
- Headquarters: Coeur d'Alene, Idaho, U.S.
- Key people: Tom Soumas, Jr. Justin S. Colin (1924–2012)

Gem State Airlines was a United States airline founded in 1978 in Coeur d'Alene, Idaho. It carried passengers for 11 months, from December 1978 to November 1979, and merged in January 1980 with Air Pacific to become Golden Gate Airlines.

Founded by Thomas D. "Tom" Soumas Jr. (b. 1953) of Coeur d'Alene, its primary investor was Justin S. Colin (1924–2012), a New York financier.

Idaho's nickname is the Gem State, with origins back to its territorial years.

== Cities served ==
- Boise, Idaho
- Coeur d'Alene, Idaho
- Idaho Falls, Idaho
- Lewiston, Idaho
- Pocatello, Idaho
- Pullman, Washington (& Moscow, Idaho)
- Reno, Nevada
- Salt Lake City, Utah
- Seattle, Washington
- Spokane, Washington
- Sun Valley, Idaho
- Twin Falls, Idaho

== Fleet ==
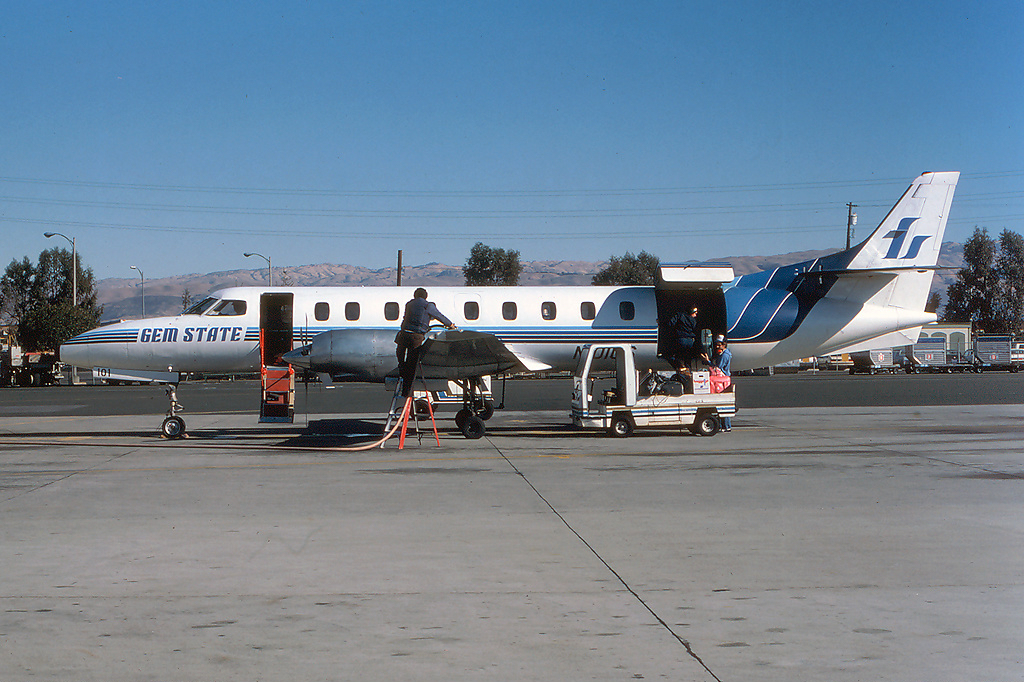
Gem State Airlines Swearingen SA-226TC Metro II

Gem State operated the following turboprop aircraft:

- 6 Fairchild Swearingen Metroliner
- 3 Convair 580

== See also ==
- List of defunct airlines of the United States
