= Swift Aire Lines =

United States regional airline, 1969–1981

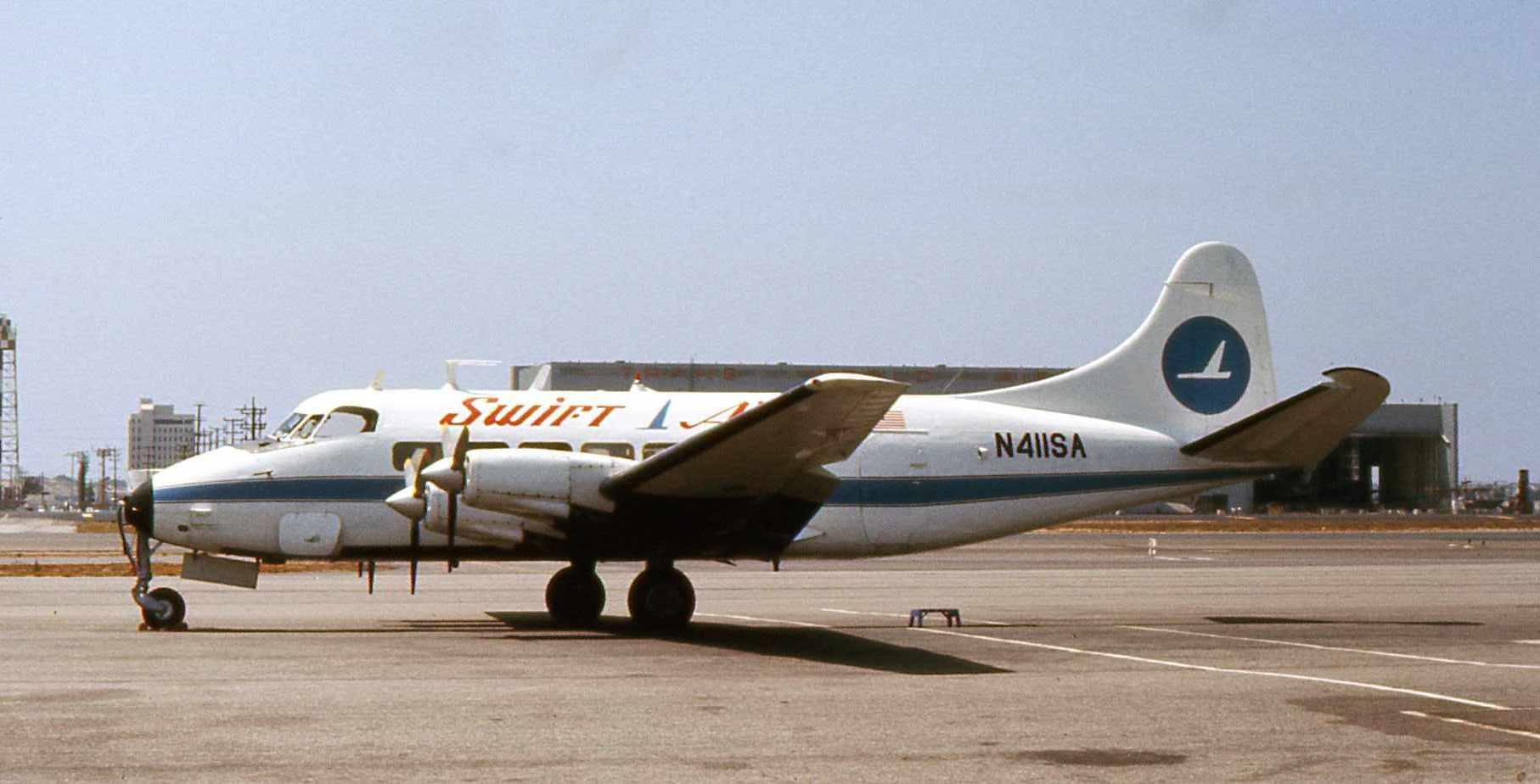
- Riley Turbo Skyliner at San Francisco in 1974.
IATA	ICAO	Call sign
WI	IY	—
- Commenced operations: 1969; 57 years ago
- Ceased operations: 1981; 45 years ago
- Operating bases: San Luis Obispo, California
- Focus cities: San Francisco; Sacramento; Los Angeles
- Headquarters: San Luis Obispo, California
- Key people: Charles Wiswell, founder
- Employees: 300

Swift Aire Lines was a U.S. commuter air carrier that was based in San Luis Obispo, California. The airline's two letter code was "WI". Swift Aire provided scheduled passenger air service wholly within California from the late 1960s until 1981 when it merged with Golden Gate Airlines. Shortly thereafter, Golden Gate experienced financial challenges and ceased all operations.

Swift Aire served as the unofficial hometown airline of San Luis Obispo as the air carrier was founded in 1969 in this small city located on the scenic central coast of California. Swift Aire identified a niche which was the lack of passenger air service at San Luis Obispo at the time. Southwest Airways had previously served San Luis Obispo with Douglas DC-3 aircraft. However, this airline then introduced more modern Martin 4-0-4 prop airliners into its fleet which were too large to operate from the relatively short runway at the San Luis Obispo Airport. During the mid-1950s, Southwest Airways moved its passenger service for all of San Luis Obispo County to the Paso Robles Airport which is located approximately 25 miles north of the city of San Luis Obispo. Southwest Airways subsequently changed its name to Pacific Air Lines which in turn introduced new Fairchild F-27 turboprops into its fleet. Pacific operated F-27 propjet service from Paso Robles to Los Angeles, San Francisco and other California cities. Pacific Air Lines then merged with Bonanza Air Lines and West Coast Airlines to form Air West which continued to serve Paso Robles. Air West was then renamed Hughes Airwest. All three airlines listed San Luis Obispo in their respective system timetables even though their services were actually operated from Paso Robles with Fairchild F-27 propjets. Swift Aire was responsible for the return of air service to San Luis Obispo in 1969 while Hughes Airwest eventually ceased all service to Paso Robles in 1974. Building on its success in San Luis Obispo, Swift Aire then expanded its service to other California cities.

Swift Aire was also responsible for significantly improving air service into San Luis Obispo as well as other cities served by the carrier when it introduced new Fokker F.27-600 turboprop aircraft into its fleet. Swift Aire purchased these 48-seat twin turboprops from the manufacturer. The primary runway at the San Luis Obispo Airport had been lengthened thus facilitating expanded service provided by larger aircraft. The Fokker F.27 propjet was the largest aircraft to operate into San Luis Obispo Airport at the time and greatly enhanced passenger comfort for Swift Aire's customers.

A book on the history of Swift Aire Lines was written in 1979 by an authority on commuter airlines, Dr. Imre E. Quastler of San Diego State University.

== Accident history ==
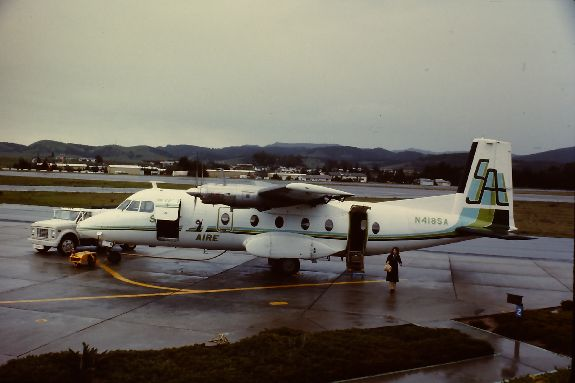
Nord 262 turboprop, registration N418SA

On March 10, 1979, Swift Aire flight number 235 operated by a Nord 262 twin turboprop aircraft (registration N418SA, pictured) flying from Los Angeles International Airport to Santa Maria with continuing service to San Luis Obispo crashed into the Pacific Ocean off Santa Monica shortly after departing from LAX. The report on the crash determined the right engine failed during takeoff and the flight crew responded to the alarms by shutting off the left engine rendering the plane powerless. Two crew members and one passenger died while one crew member and three passengers survived. This was the only fatal accident experienced by the airline.

== Destinations ==
Swift Aire served the following destinations during its existence. Those cities appearing in bold were being served by the airline in April 1981 shortly before Swift Aire was merged into Golden Gate Airlines:

- **Bakersfield, California** (BFL)
- Fresno, California (FAT)
- **Los Angeles, California** (LAX)
- Modesto, California (MOD)
- **Palm Springs, California** (PSP)
- Paso Robles, California (PRB)
- **Sacramento, California** (SMF)
- **San Francisco, California** (SFO)
- **San Jose, California** (SJC)
- **San Luis Obispo, California** (SBP) - Swift Aire home base
- **Santa Maria, California** (SMX)
- Visalia, California (VIS)

Following the merger with Golden Gate Airlines, Swift Aire began serving San Diego, California via Lindbergh Field (SAN).

== Fleet ==
- Aérospatiale N 262 (Nord 262)
- Fokker F.27 Friendship (New build series 600 models. Following the merger of Swift Aire with Golden Gate Airlines and the subsequent failure of the merged carriers, the F.27s were sold to Air North, a regional airline based in the northeast U.S. which subsequently changed its name to Brockway Air. Air North then adopted Swift Aire's green and white paint scheme for their aircraft.)
- Riley Turbo Skyliner (modified de Havilland Heron)
- de Havilland Heron
- Piper PA-31 Navajo

== See also ==
- List of defunct airlines of the United States
