= Paso Robles Municipal Airport =

Airport in San Luis Obispo County, California, United States

Paso Robles Municipal Airport Estrella Army Airfield
- KPRB, July 2007
- IATA: PRB; ICAO: KPRB; FAA LID: PRB

Summary
- Airport type: Public
- Owner: City of Paso Robles
- Operator: City of Paso Robles & FAA
- Serves: Paso Robles Regional Area
- Location: Paso Robles, California
- Elevation AMSL: 839 ft (256 m)
- Coordinates: 35°40′22″N 120°37′37″W
- Website: www.prcity.com/...

Map
- Location within California

Runways
Direction	Length		Surface
Direction	ft	m	Surface
01/19	6,008	1,831	Asphalt
13/31	4,701	1,433	Asphalt

Helipads
Number	Length		Surface
Number	ft	m	Surface
H1	100	30	Asphalt

Statistics (2022)
- Aircraft operations (year ending 4/13/2022): 36,250
- Based aircraft: 157
- Source: Federal Aviation Administration

Paso Robles Municipal Airport (IATA: PRB, ICAO: KPRB, FAA LID: PRB) is four miles (6.4 km) northeast of downtown Paso Robles, in San Luis Obispo County, California, United States.

== Facilities ==
The airport covers 1,300 acres (5.3 km^{2}) and has two runways and one helipad:

- 1/19: 6,008 ft × 150 ft (1,831 m × 46 m), asphalt
- 13/31: 4,701 ft × 100 ft (1,433 m × 30 m), asphalt
- Helipad H1: 100 ft × 100 ft (30 m × 30 m), asphalt

== History ==
On September 3, 1942, construction began on the Airfield, to be used as a Marine Corps Bomber Base. On April 8, 1943, the field was dedicated as Estrella Army Airfield to be used by the Army Air Corps. Estrella Army Airfield had 1259 acres of land, two 4,700-foot-long (1,400 m) runways, an operations building and a three-bay fire station. The Marine Corps Units occupied buildings to the west, across Airport Road in what is now the California Youth Authority. On August 29, 1947, the Federal Government transferred 1,057 acres (4.28 km^{2}) to the County of San Luis Obispo to be used as a commercial airport, and 202 acres (0.82 km^{2}) and buildings to the State of California to be used as a correctional facility.

Pacific Seaboard Air Lines was the first airline at Paso Robles. In 1933 Pacific Seaboard had two daily round trip Bellanca CH-300s Los Angeles – Santa Barbara – Santa Maria – San Luis Obispo – Paso Robles – Monterey – Salinas – San Jose – San Francisco. Pacific Seaboard would later move its entire operation to the eastern U.S., be renamed Chicago and Southern Air Lines, and in 1953 be acquired by and merged into Delta Air Lines.

After the county's acquisition of the airfield, the County of San Luis Obispo extended runway 01/19 from 4,700 to 6,009 feet (1,433 to 1,832 m); installed high intensity lights; and built a large hangar, ten T-hangars and a terminal building between 1949 and 1952. In 1956 flights by Southwest Airways commenced with Martin 4-0-4s. Southwest Airways changed its name to Pacific Air Lines which later served Paso Robles with Fairchild F-27s to Los Angeles, San Francisco and other California cities. In 1968 Pacific Air Lines merged with Bonanza Air Lines and West Coast Airlines to form Air West which continued to serve the airport with F-27s. In 1970 Air West was renamed Hughes Airwest which continued to serve Paso Robles with F-27s until 1974. Pacific, Air West and Hughes Airwest all listed San Luis Obispo in their timetables as being served via the Paso Robles Airport. Following the cessation of service by Hughes Airwest, San Luis Obispo-based Swift Aire Lines was the only airline serving Paso Robles in 1976, with nonstop flights from San Francisco (SFO) and San Jose (SJC) as well as direct flights from Los Angeles (LAX), with these latter flights making intermediate stops in both Santa Maria and San Luis Obispo, with all service operated with de Havilland Heron commuter prop aircraft.

Passenger flights returned to Paso Robles when SkyWest Airlines (Delta Connection) established a base at the airfield flying Embraer EMB-120 Brasilias and Fairchild Swearingen Metroliners to several California cities including Los Angeles, San Francisco and Fresno. This business plan proved not to be viable and SkyWest withdrew from Paso Robles. Several commuter airlines, such as Golden Carriage Air and Eagle Airlines, served Paso Robles in the late 1970s, but none proved successful.

After the end of airline flights by Hughes Airwest at the airport in 1974, the county sold the airport to the City of Paso Robles. The City of Paso Robles subdivided unused land into 81 parcels for commercial development. The city formed an all-volunteer Fire, Crash and Rescue Department to serve the airport and the surrounding area. The city took over the water wells and the sewer treatment plant from the state to serve both the airport and the Youth Authority.

== Current operations ==
There are no passenger airline flights at the airport, but there are charter flights. The California Department of Forestry (CalFire) has an Air Attack Base at the airport for major fire protection for three counties (San Luis Obispo, Kern and Monterey) and the 5,800,000 acres (23,000 km^{2}) of wildland area in this part of Central California. At the base, aircraft are loaded with fire retardant chemicals, such as Phos chek, which are dropped on brush and forest fires. The California Highway Patrol (CHP) Air Operations Division house a fixed wing aircraft, used for speed enforcement, as well as a helicopter, used for search and rescue missions. This local Air Operations Division also provides a variety of search, patrol and enforcement services for the local communities. In addition to these fixed operators, occasional military, air charter, corporate, air ambulance, and other flying services operate from the airport.

On June 8, 2014, the US Air Force landed a C-17 Globemaster III at the field, proving that it can support military transport to and from Camp Roberts, some 15 miles (24 km) away.

The area around the Paso Robles Airport, known as Airport Road Industrial Park, is home to many aviation maintenance providers and facilities, as well as many aviation parts manufacturers and other related businesses. Under the city's direction, sections of the industrial park have been developed with utilities and infrastructure improvements. Aircraft hangar and aviation service facilities have been constructed. In 1973, there were just four businesses employing 22 people at the airport. Today, there is just over 500,000 square feet (46,000 m^{2}) of industrial building space in operation at the airport, now housing nearly 50 individual businesses, and providing over 700 jobs in the community. The number of aircraft based at the airport has grown from 55 at the time of city acquisition in 1973, to around 220 today. Being halfway between Los Angeles and San Francisco the airport has a service area of over 2,000 square miles (5,200 km^{2}) in northern San Luis Obispo and southern Monterey counties.

== Fixed-base operators ==
- Loyd's Aviation

=== Other airport businesses ===
- Flight Environments
- Genuine Aircraft Hardware Co.
- Del Rio Aviation
- Joe's One-Niner Diner (inside terminal building)

== Image gallery ==
Paso Robles air terminal, 2008

Terminal

PRB in 2009

== See also ==
- California World War II Army Airfields
- Paso Robles
