= West Air (United States) =

Airline of the United States

West Air, Inc.
| IATA | ICAO | Call sign |
|---|---|---|
| - | PCM | PAC VALLEY |
- Founded: 1988; 38 years ago
- Hubs: Las Vegas; Oakland; Ontario; Sacramento; San Diego
- Fleet size: 33
- Destinations: 22
- Headquarters: Fresno, California, United States
- Key people: Tom Jordan (President)
- Website: westair.net

West Air, Inc. is an American airline based in Fresno, California, owned by Empire Airlines. It provides feeder service on behalf of FedEx Express throughout California and parts of Nevada and Utah.

== History ==
The airline also operated from Mexico through its associate company Westair de Mexico (now defunct) with Fairchild Metro III aircraft. On 31 December 2021, West Air was acquired by Empire Airlines.

== Fleet ==
As of September 2015 the West Air fleet includes:

West Air fleet
| Aircraft | In fleet | Notes |
|---|---|---|
| Cessna 208B Caravan-675 | 33 | |
| Total | 33 | |
