= Golden Gate Airlines =

United States regional airline

- Founded: 1980; 45 years ago
- Ceased operations: 1981; 44 years ago
- Headquarters: Monterey, California, United States

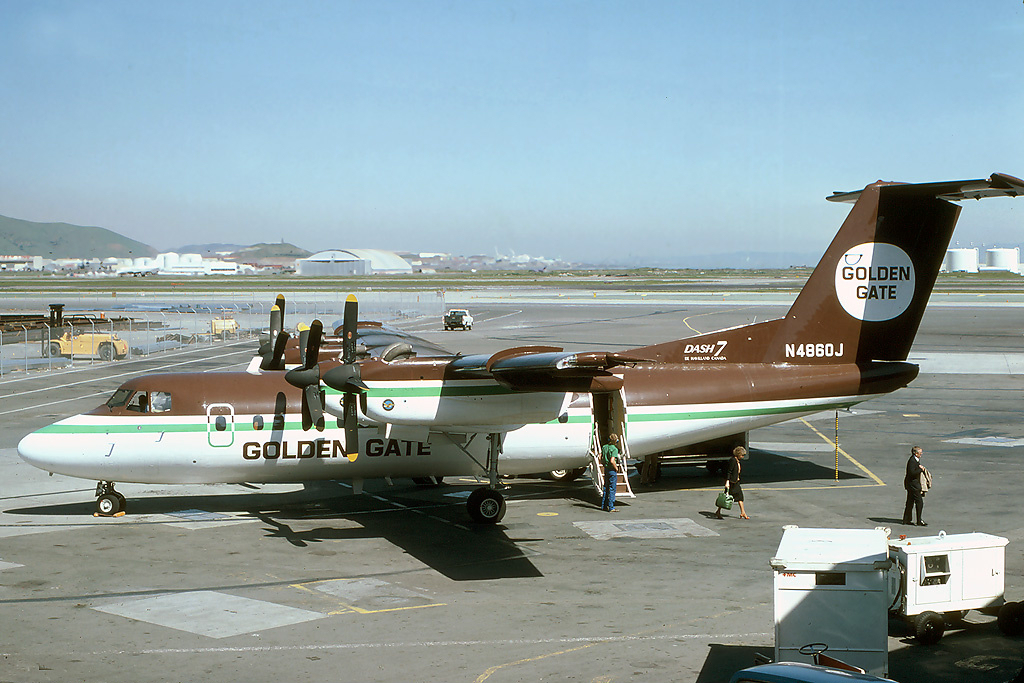
Golden Gate Airlines Dash 7

Golden Gate Airlines was a United States regional airline founded in 1980 in Monterey, California after the merger of Gem State Airlines and Air Pacific (USA) in 1979. It merged again in 1981, this time with Swift Aire Lines, but discontinued service shortly thereafter and then went out of business.

== Cities served ==
Golden Gate Airlines served the following destinations during its existence. In July 1981 Golden Gate Airlines and merger partner Swift Aire Lines were serving a number of destinations either separately or jointly together.

- Bakersfield, California (BFL) – served by Golden Gate and Swift Aire
- Boise, Idaho (BOI)
- Elko, Nevada (EKO)
- Ely, Nevada (ELY)
- Fresno, California (FAT)
- Grand Junction, Colorado (GJT)
- Lake Tahoe, California (TVL)
- Las Vegas, Nevada (LAS)
- Los Angeles, California (LAX) – Hub - served by Golden Gate and Swift Aire
- Merced, California (MCE)
- Modesto, California (MOD)
- Monterey, California (MRY) – Golden Gate Airlines home base
- Oxnard, California (OXR)
- Oakland, California (OAK)
- Palm Springs, California (PSP) – served by Swift Aire
- Pendleton, Oregon (PDT)
- Reno, Nevada (RNO)
- Sacramento, California (SMF)
- Salt Lake City, Utah (SLC) - Hub
- San Francisco, California (SFO) – Hub - served by Golden Gate and Swift Aire
- San Diego, California (SAN) – served by Swift Aire
- San Jose, California (SJC) – served by Golden Gate and Swift Aire
- San Luis Obispo, California (SBP) – served by Swift Aire
- Santa Barbara, California (SBA) – served by Swift Aire
- Santa Maria, California (SMX) – served by Swift Aire
- Stockton, California (SCK)
- Sun Valley, Idaho (SUN)

== Fleet ==
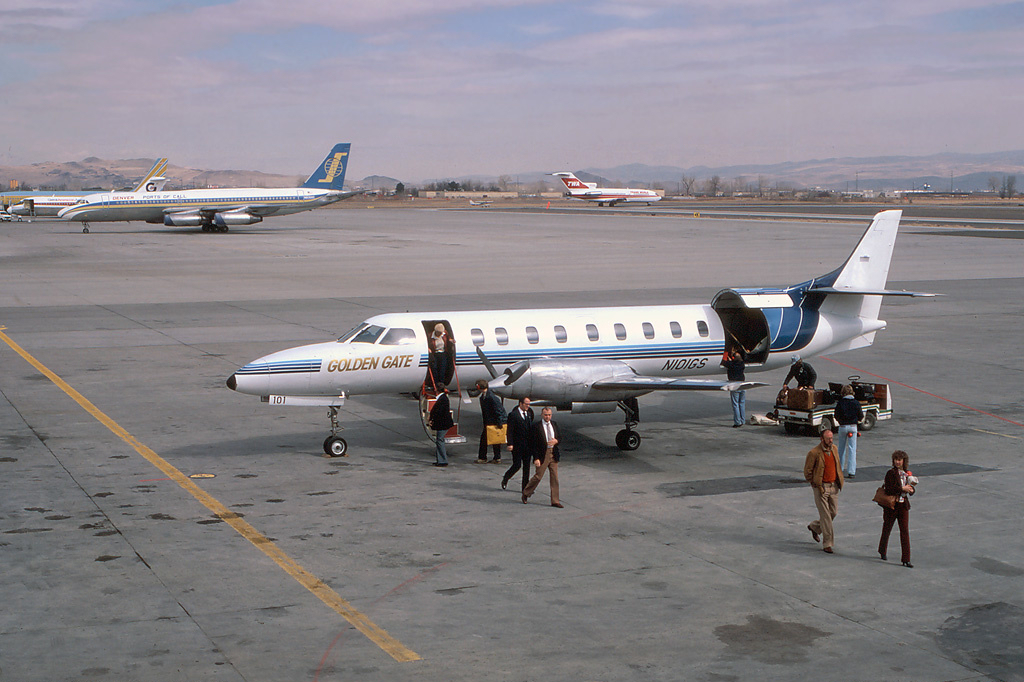
Golden Gate Airlines Swearingen SA-226TC Metro II

Following the merger of Golden Gate Airlines and Swift Aire, the following turboprop aircraft types were being operated by the combined air carriers:

- de Havilland Canada DHC-7 Dash 7
- Convair 580
- Fairchild Swearingen Metroliner
- Aérospatiale N 262 (Nord 262) (via merger with Swift Aire Lines)
- Fokker F27 Friendship (via merger with Swift Aire Lines)

== See also ==
- List of defunct airlines of the United States
