= KIPL =

KIPL may refer to:

- KIPL (FM), a radio station (89.9 FM) licensed to serve Lihue, Hawaii, United States
- Imperial County Airport (ICAO code KIPL)
