= List of the busiest airports in California =

List of the busiest airports in California In Calendar year 2022 (FAA data) by 'passenger boardings, not total passengers, except for Tijuana.

== Airport list ==
Rank 2022	Airport	IATA Code	City	2023	2022	2021	2018	2017	2016	2015	2014	2013
1	Los Angeles International Airport	LAX	Los Angeles	40,956,673	32,326,616	23,663,410	42,624,050	41,232,432	39,636,042	36,351,272	34,314,197	32,425,892
2	San Francisco International Airport	SFO	San Francisco	24,191,159	20,411,420	11,725,347	27,790,717	26,900,048	25,707,101	24,190,560	22,756,008	21,704,626
3	San Diego International Airport	SAN	San Diego	12,190,183	11,162,224	7,836,360	12,174,224	11,139,933	10,340,164	9,985,763	9,333,152	8,878,772
–	Tijuana International Airport (Note: Tijuana airport is equipped to allow boarding from the California side via the Cross Border Xpress since the end of 2015, figures for this airport are in italics. It is Mexico's 5th busiest airport by departure seats offered.)	TIJ	Tijuana and San Diego		12,308,370	9,677,900	7,823,744	7,089,219	6,318,826		4,387,865	
4	Sacramento International Airport	SMF	Sacramento	6,371,910	6,040,824	4,760,275	5,907,629	5,341,595	4,969,366	4,714,729	4,384,616	4,255,145
5	San Jose International Airport	SJC	San Jose	5,958,855	5,590,137	3,619,690	7,032,851	6,130,878	5,321,603	4,822,480	4,621,003	4,315,839
6	John Wayne Airport	SNA	Santa Ana	5,706,332	5,536,313	3,807,205	5,201,642	5,082,716	5,217,242	4,945,209	4,584,147	4,540,628
7	Oakland San Francisco Bay Airport	OAK	Oakland	5,520,812	5,506,232	4,011,953	6,686,603	6,413,832	5,934,639	5,506,687	5,069,257	4,770,716
8	Ontario International Airport	ONT	Ontario	3,181,161	2,840,758	2,201,528	2,498,993	2,247,645	2,104,625	2,089,801	2,037,346	1,970,538
9	Hollywood Burbank Airport	BUR	Burbank	3,132,029	3,054,729	1,942,417	2,680,240	2,402,106	2,077,892	1,973,897	1,928,491	1,918,011
10	Long Beach Airport	LGB	Long Beach	1,837,634	1,600,987	1,039,432	1,908,635	1,830,745	1,386,357	1,220,937	1,368,923	1,438,756
11	Palm Springs International Airport	PSP	Palm Springs	1,625,327	1,499,987	1,044,045	1,163,883	1,055,970	995,801	947,728	953,607	875,699
12	Fresno Yosemite International Airport	FAT	Fresno	1,201,789	1,077,710	960,594	853,538	755,140	761,298	695,008	710,353	684,849
13	Santa Barbara Municipal Airport	SBA	Santa Barbara	638,802	610,916	440,229	403,745	356,608	329,751	316,511	355,049	364,360
14	San Luis Obispo County Regional Airport	SBP	San Luis Obispo	324,925	273,690							
15	Charles M. Schulz–Sonoma County Airport	STS	Santa Rosa	318,197	304,053							
16	Monterey Regional Airport	MRY	Monterey	259,778	230,669							
17	Meadows Field Airport	BFL	Bakersfield	174,891	141,352							
18	Arcata–Eureka Airport	ACV	Arcata	117,972	118,924							
19	Redding Regional Airport	RDD	Redding	87,670	98,725							
20	Stockton Metropolitan Airport	SCK	Stockton	67,688	74,529							
21	San Bernardino International Airport	SBD	San Bernardino	27,349	10,142							
22	Santa Maria Public Airport	SMX	Santa Maria	14,409	15,911							
23	Eastern Sierra Regional Airport	BIH	Bishop	10,007	10,754							
24	Del Norte County Airport	CEC	Crescent City	7,879	8,218							
25	Imperial County Airport	IPL	Imperial	7,100	9,180							
26	Hawthorne Municipal Airport	HHR	Hawthorne	5,100	5,001							
27	McClellan–Palomar Airport	CRQ	Carlsbad	4,329	3,715							
28	Mammoth Yosemite Airport	MMH	Mammoth Lakes	3,966	4,056							
29	Merced Regional Airport	MCE	Merced	3,798	3,431							
