= Palm Springs International Airport =

International airport in Palm Springs, California, United States

Palm Springs International Airport Palm Springs Army Airfield

- IATA: PSP; ICAO: KPSP; FAA LID: PSP

Summary
- Airport type: Public
- Owner: City of Palm Springs
- Operator: City of Palm Springs Aviation Department
- Location: Palm Springs, California
- Elevation AMSL: 476 ft (145 m)
- Coordinates: 33°49′47″N 116°30′24″W
- Website: flypsp.com

Maps
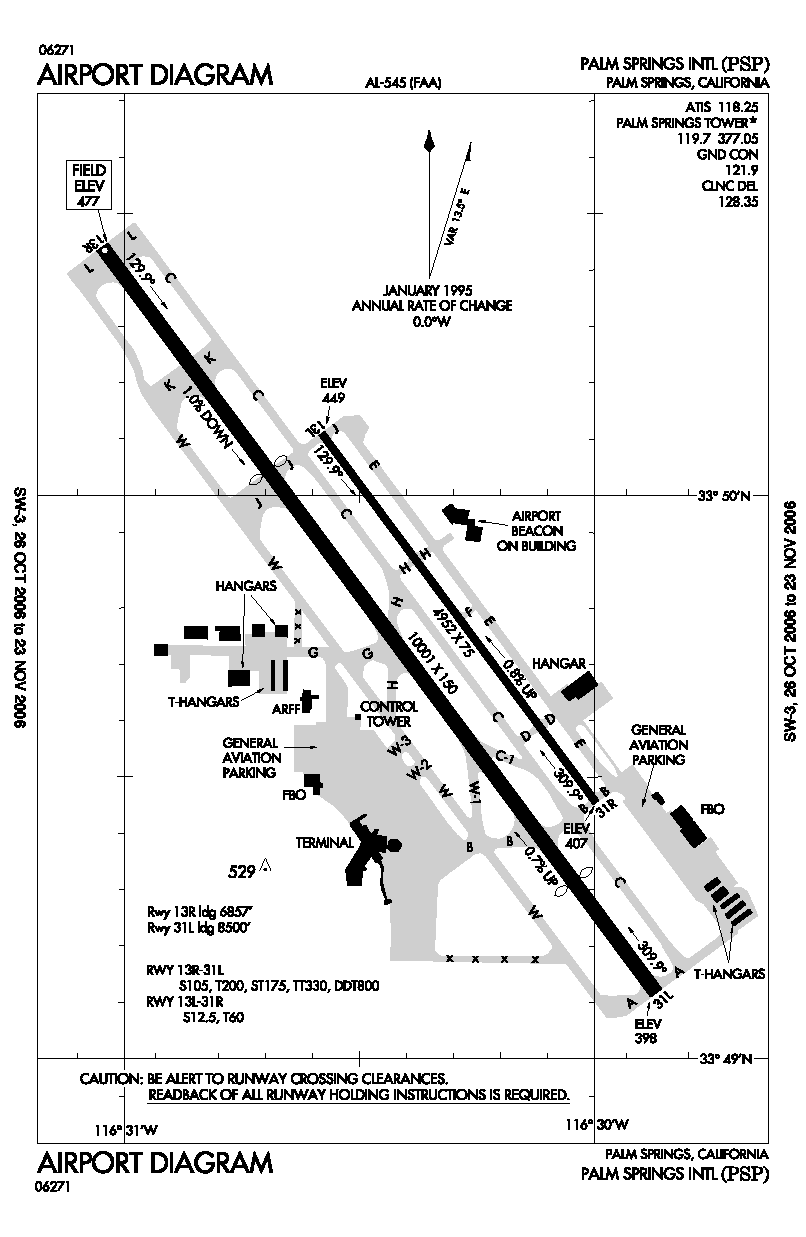
- FAA airport diagram (2006)
- Interactive map of Palm Springs International Airport; Palm Springs Army Airfield

Runways
Direction	Length		Surface
Direction	ft	m	Surface
13R/31L	10,000	3,048	Asphalt
13L/31R	4,953	1,510	Asphalt

Statistics (2025)
- Total Passengers: 3,307,140
- Aircraft operations (local+intinerant): 111,080
- Source: FAA

Palm Springs International Airport (IATA: PSP, ICAO: KPSP, FAA LID: PSP), formerly Palm Springs Municipal Airport, is an airport two miles east of downtown Palm Springs, California, United States. The airport covers 940 acres and has two runways. The facility operates year-round, with most flights occurring in the fall, winter, and spring.

The airport was named as number 3 in a 2011 list of "America's Most Stress-Free Airports" by Smarter Travel.

== History ==
=== Military use ===
PSP was built as a United States Army Air Corps emergency landing field in 1939 on land owned by the Agua Caliente Band of Cahuilla Indians due to its clear weather and its proximity to March Field and the Los Angeles area.

In March 1941, the War Department certified improvements to the existing airport in Palm Springs as essential to national defense. The airport was approved to serve as a staging field by the Air Corps Ferrying Command 21st Ferrying Group in November 1941. Land was acquired to build a major airfield a half mile from the old airfield site. The new airfield, Palm Springs Army Airfield, was completed in early 1942, and the old air field was then used only as a backup.

On June 1, 1944, training moved to Brownsville Army Airfield, Texas, and the airfield was used for Army and Navy transport flights until the end of April 1945. The auxiliary field or backup field was declared surplus on May 12, 1945, and the main airfield was declared excess and transferred to the War Assets Administration for disposal in 1946 and it was sold to private buyers. The City of Palm Springs purchased the land in 1961 and converted it to Palm Springs Municipal Airport.

=== Historical airline service ===
Palm Springs had scheduled passenger service in 1934 operated by Palm Springs Air Lines with Ford Trimotor aircraft with flights to the Union Air Terminal (now the Hollywood Burbank Airport) in Burbank. Western Airlines flights began by 1943 followed by Bonanza Air Lines by 1955. Service was operated through the Thermal, California Airport. Bonanza reportedly moved to the Palm Springs Airport on December 15, 1957. In 1964, Western Lockheed L-188 Electras flew nonstop to Las Vegas, Los Angeles and San Diego. Bonanza and successors Air West and Hughes Airwest served Palm Springs for many years with the Fairchild F-27 followed by Douglas DC-9s. American Airlines Boeing 707s appeared in winter 1967–68. By 1969, American had four Boeing 707 departures a day from the airport, two nonstops to Los Angeles and two nonstops to Phoenix and on to Chicago. Trans World Airlines Boeing 707s arrived in 1978, flying to Chicago via Phoenix.

Scheduled nonstops did not reach beyond California, Las Vegas, and Phoenix until winter 1969–70, when American Airlines started a nonstop to Chicago O'Hare Airport. In the 1970s, American McDonnell Douglas DC-10s appeared, the largest aircraft ever scheduled to PSP. In 1976, American was flying the DC-10 to New York LaGuardia Airport via Chicago O'Hare Airport as well as Boeing 727-100s to Dallas/Fort Worth, Phoenix and Los Angeles. In 1976 Western Boeing 727-200s and Boeing 737-200s flew nonstop to Las Vegas, Los Angeles and San Francisco. In 1987, Western was merged into Delta Air Lines which continues to serve PSP with year-round service to Salt Lake City (via Delta Connection) and seasonal service to Atlanta, Minneapolis-St. Paul, and Seattle. Other jet service to Palm Springs in the past included flights operated by Air21, Air California and successor Air Cal, America West Airlines, CP Air, the original Frontier Airlines (1950–1986), Hughes Airwest, Morris Air, Pacific Express, Pacific Southwest Airlines (PSA), Pan Am, Reno Air, Republic Airlines (1979–1986) and USAir.

Commuter and regional airlines at Palm Springs from the late 1970s to the 1990s included Air Bahia, Air Nevada, American Eagle operated by Wings West Airlines, America West Express operated by Mesa Airlines, Cable Commuter Airlines, California Seaboard Airlines, Dash Air, Delta Connection operated by SkyWest Airlines, Imperial Airlines, Inland Empire Airlines, Scenic Airlines, SkyWest Airlines (operating independently), Sun Aire Lines, Swift Aire Lines, Trans World Express operated by Alpha Air, United Express operated by WestAir and later by SkyWest Airlines, and USAir Express followed by US Airways Express operated by Trans States Airlines and StatesWest Airlines.

=== 1990–2020: Growth and expansion ===
During the 1990s, the airport transformed from a single runway into a dual-runway airport with the completion of a nearly 5,000 foot general runway in 1993 and the expansion of the existing runway to 10,000 feet as part of a 1994 master plan. Simultaneously, the airport grew with the addition of the Sonny Bono Concourse in 1999, outdoor courtyard in 2007, and renovated South Concourse by 2007. The airport installed Wi-Fi in December 2004.

In 2010, WestJet launched flights to PSP with service to Calgary, Edmonton, and Vancouver. In 2011, the airline added service to Toronto, and upgraded Calgary to year-round service. The airline has since dropped Toronto, but has since added seasonal service to Winnipeg and upgraded Vancouver to year-round. In November 2011, Frontier Airlines launched service to PSP with seasonal service to Denver. The airline served PSP from 2011 to 2021, when it pulled out in favor of expanding flights at Ontario. In December 2011, low-cost carrier Virgin America launched seasonal service to PSP from San Francisco, and in 2012, launched the airport's first ever service to New York's JFK Airport. The airline upgraded service to year-round in 2016.

In 2013, a new Air Traffic Control Tower opened at the airport, replacing the airport's old tower (which had been in operation since 1967) while giving controllers a better view of planes on the airfield and at the airport. The airport also boosted perimeter security with a radar-based system to better detect airport intrusions.

Delta Air Lines began flights to Seattle in December 2014 with the Embraer E175. JetBlue launched flights to New York-JFK in 2016 and Boston in 2019. In December 2016, Air Canada Rouge launched service between PSP and Toronto using the Airbus A319. In December 2018, Delta launched seasonal flights to Atlanta.

However, in 2020, as a result of the onset of the COVID-19 pandemic, airlines suspended most seasonal and some year-round destinations as traffic plummeted during the month of March,

=== 2020-present: Record-breaking growth ===
In September 2020, Southwest Airlines announced plans to serve Palm Springs, year-round. Flights to Oakland, Phoenix, and Denver launched in November 2020, and to Las Vegas in May 2021.

In December 2020, Delta resumed service to Atlanta and Minneapolis-St. Paul with the Boeing 737 and Seattle with the Embraer E175. Also, Alaska added flights to San Jose, Reno, and Boise using the Embraer E175. Simultaneously, American and JetBlue announced flights to Philadelphia and Fort Lauderdale, respectively.

In August 2021, the airport renovated and expanded the ticketing area. It also installed a new baggage handling system to cope with increased passenger growth and demand.

In October 2021, Southwest Airlines launched daily, year-round flights to Sacramento. In November, the airline inaugurated flights to Chicago-Midway, Dallas-Love Field, and Portland, Oregon. Simultaneously, Allegiant launched seasonal flights to Nashville, Tennessee and Des Moines. On November 19, Alaska Airlines launched flights to Austin, Texas and later expanded its seasonal PDX service into June (using the Embraer E175 from April through June). With the reopening of the Canada-United States Border, Canadian service was restored with the return of Air Canada on November 4, 2021, and the entrance of Canadian ultra-low cost carriers Swoop and Flair in December.

In January 2022, AHA! Airlines launched flights to Reno using the Embraer E145 operated by ExpressJet.

In March, PSP launched a new incentive program to attract more year-round domestic and international service (from cities with U.S. Border Preclearance), along with nonstop flights to Hawaii.

An Avelo Airlines Boeing 737-700 on approach to Palm Springs in 2023

In September, American and Alaska relaunched their respective seasonal services to Chicago O'Hare and Portland one month early. In November, Air Canada Rouge began flying the Airbus A321 on select frequencies to Toronto, while American upgraded Chicago O'Hare to double-daily service on select days, filling the void left by the discontinuation of its PSP-Philadelphia flight. Southwest Airlines launched daily flights to San Jose, California, making the airline the largest in terms of destinations served. Avelo Airlines launched seasonal flights to Eugene, Santa Rosa, and Redmond/Bend, with PSP becoming Avelo's 30th destination.

In December 2022, PSP announced it will be doubling the number of restaurants and renovating the airport's current shops, along with adding duty-free shopping for the first time in the airport's history. The multi-phase project began in 2023. In February 2023, PSP was awarded $5.7 million to renovate and expand the baggage claim area. That same month, the airport launched a master plan process in an attempt to expand the airport while maintaining the mid-century aesthetic.

In 2024, JetBlue ended service to PSP, citing underperformance and lack of demand. Simultaneously, United Airlines launched its own seasonal transcontinental flights between PSP and Washington-Dulles. In addition, Frontier returned to PSP with flights to Denver and San Francisco, while Porter Airlines launched new service to Toronto-Pearson. That same year, PSP launched a "Stay and Play" program, allowing non-travelers to greet loved ones at the gate, visit shops and restaurants, or plane spot from the outdoor courtyard.

In 2025, Alaska Airlines upgraded its long-running Portland flights from seasonal to year-round to meet increased demand during summer, bringing the total number of year-round destinations to 14.

== Terminals ==
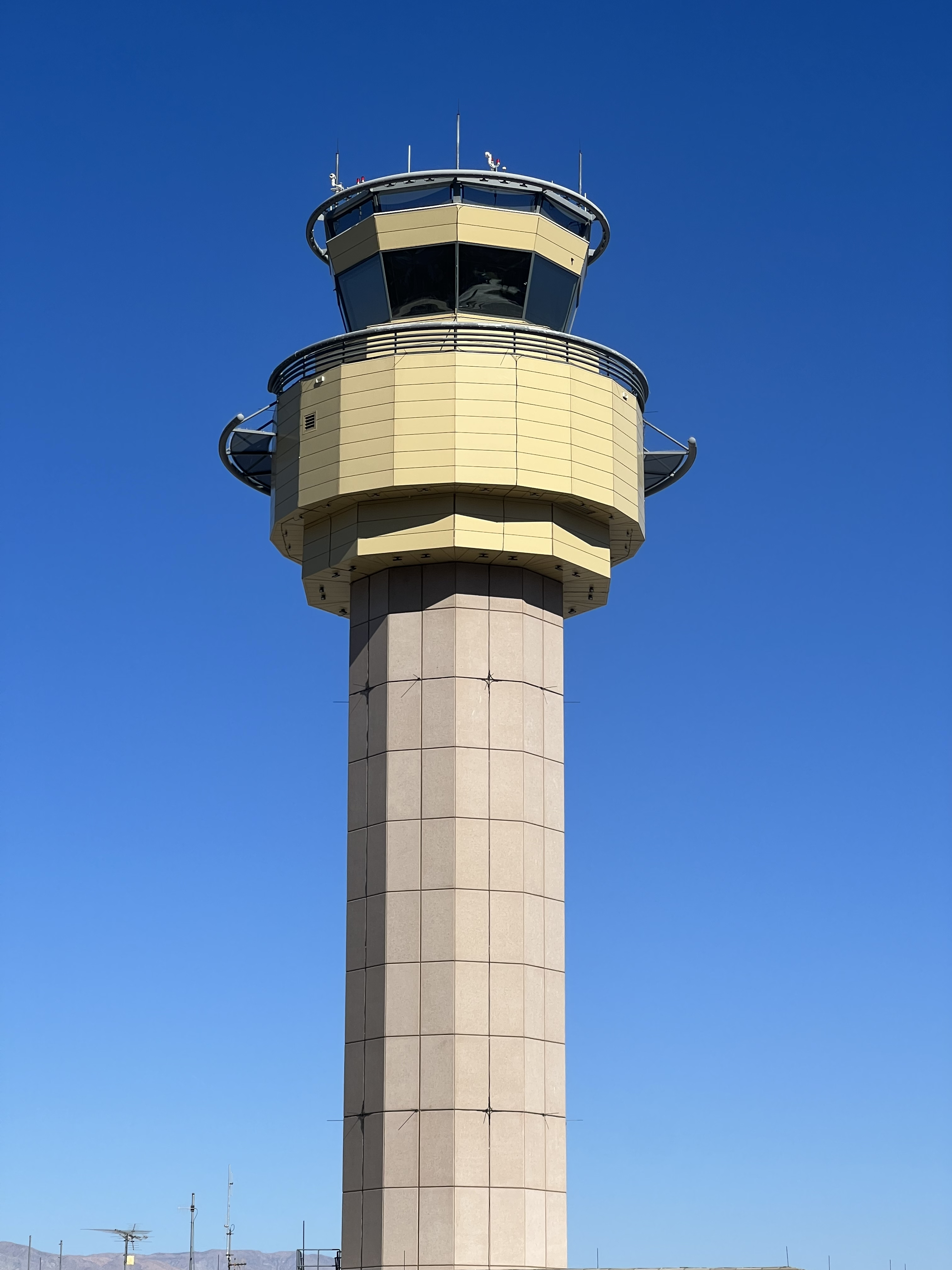
Palm Springs International Airport Tower (2021)

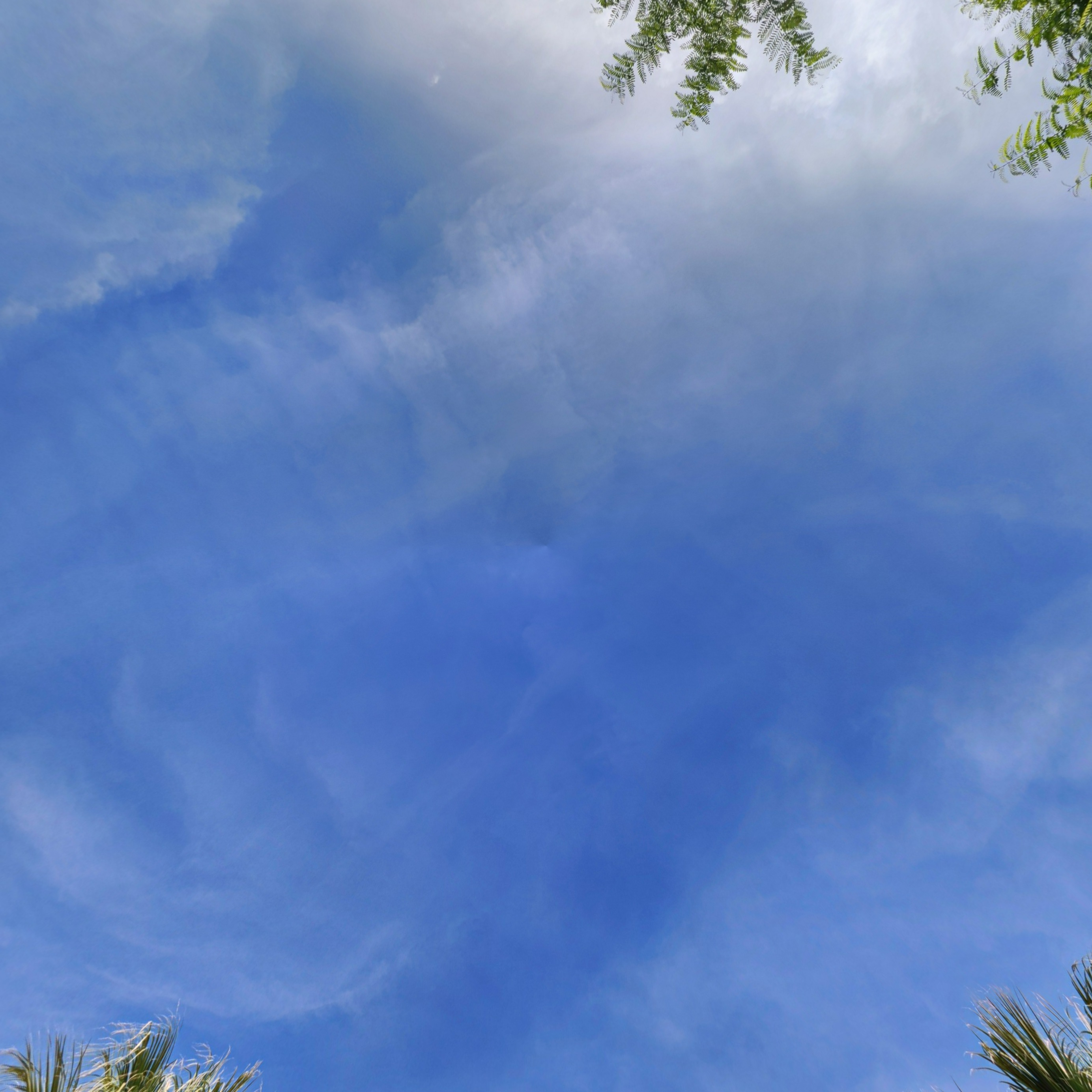
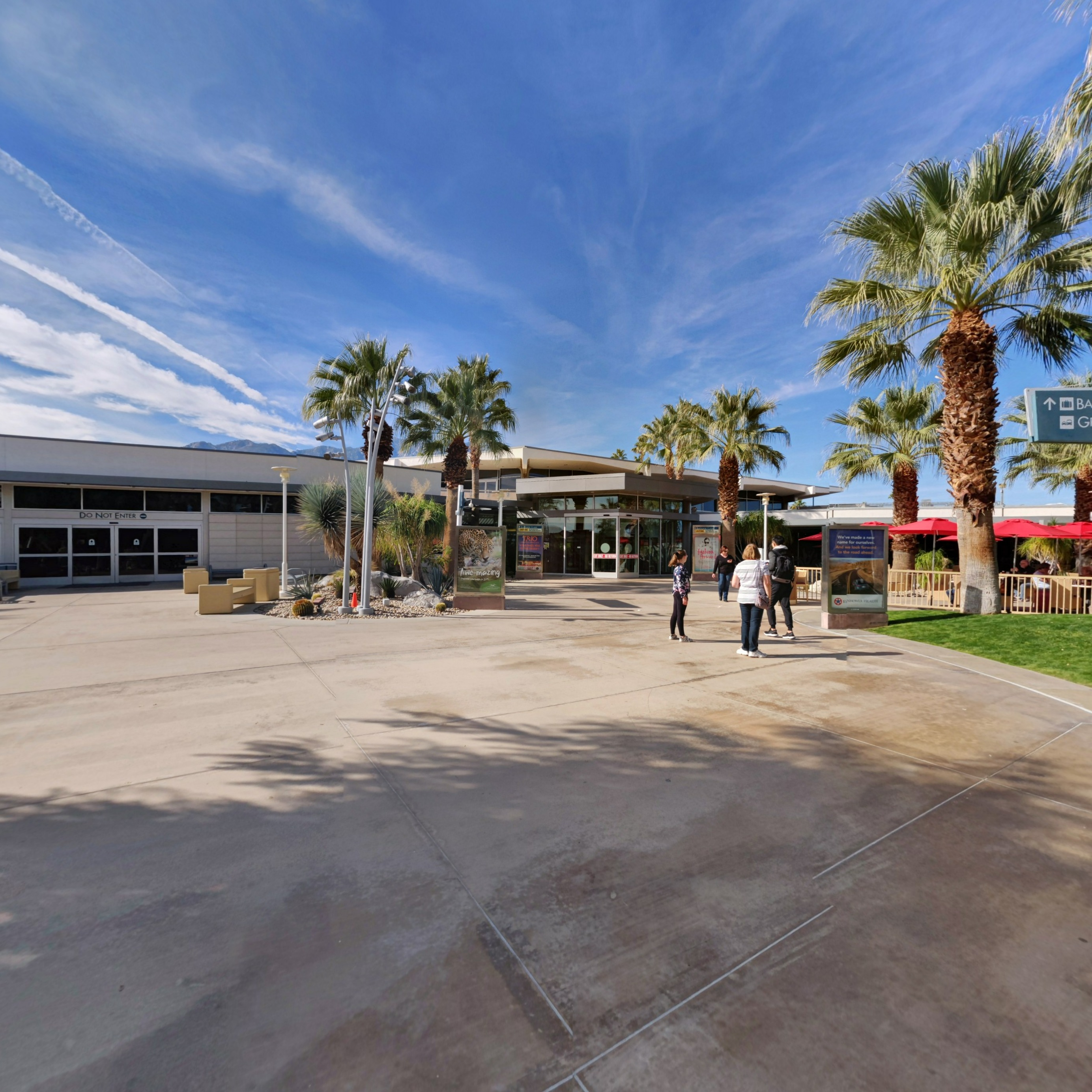
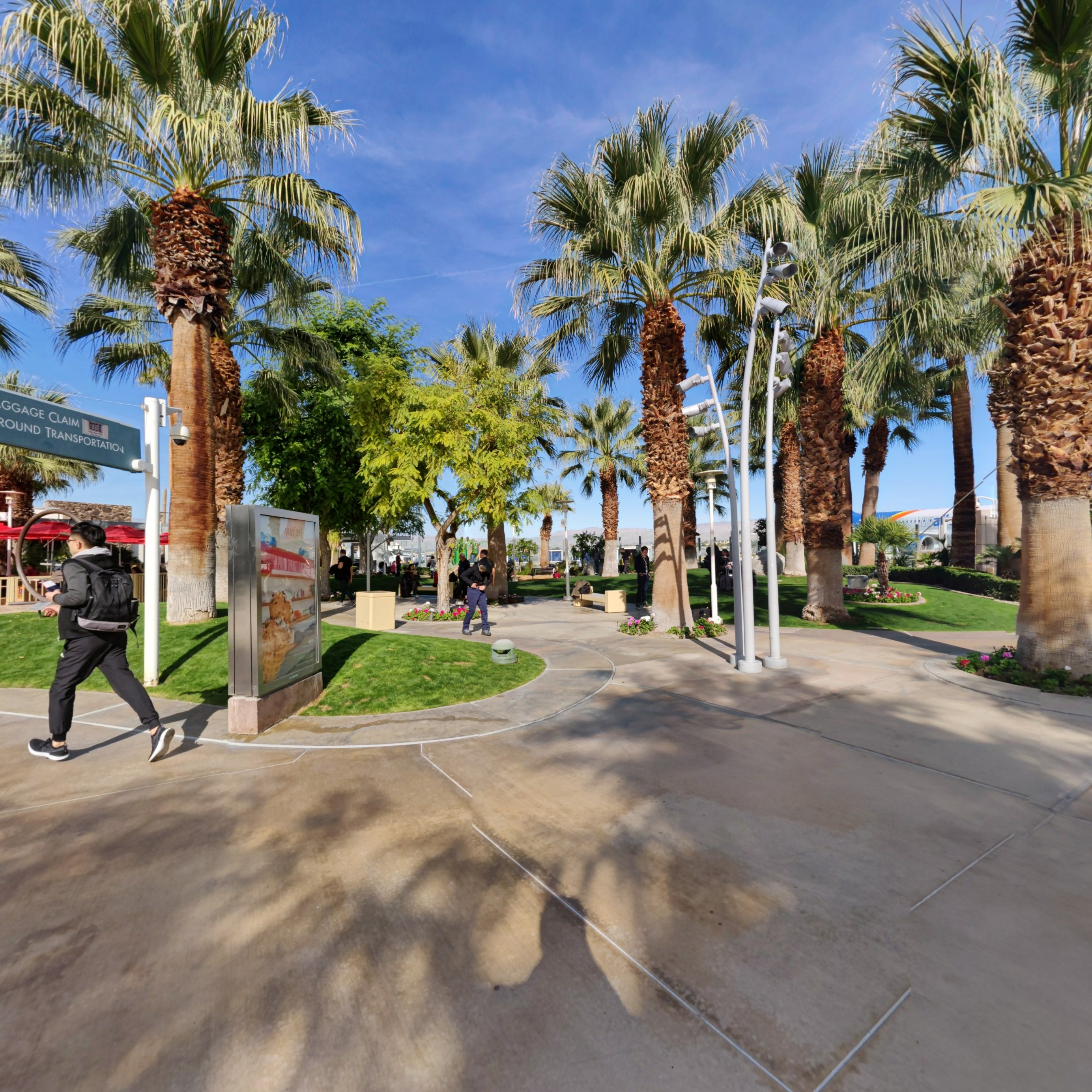
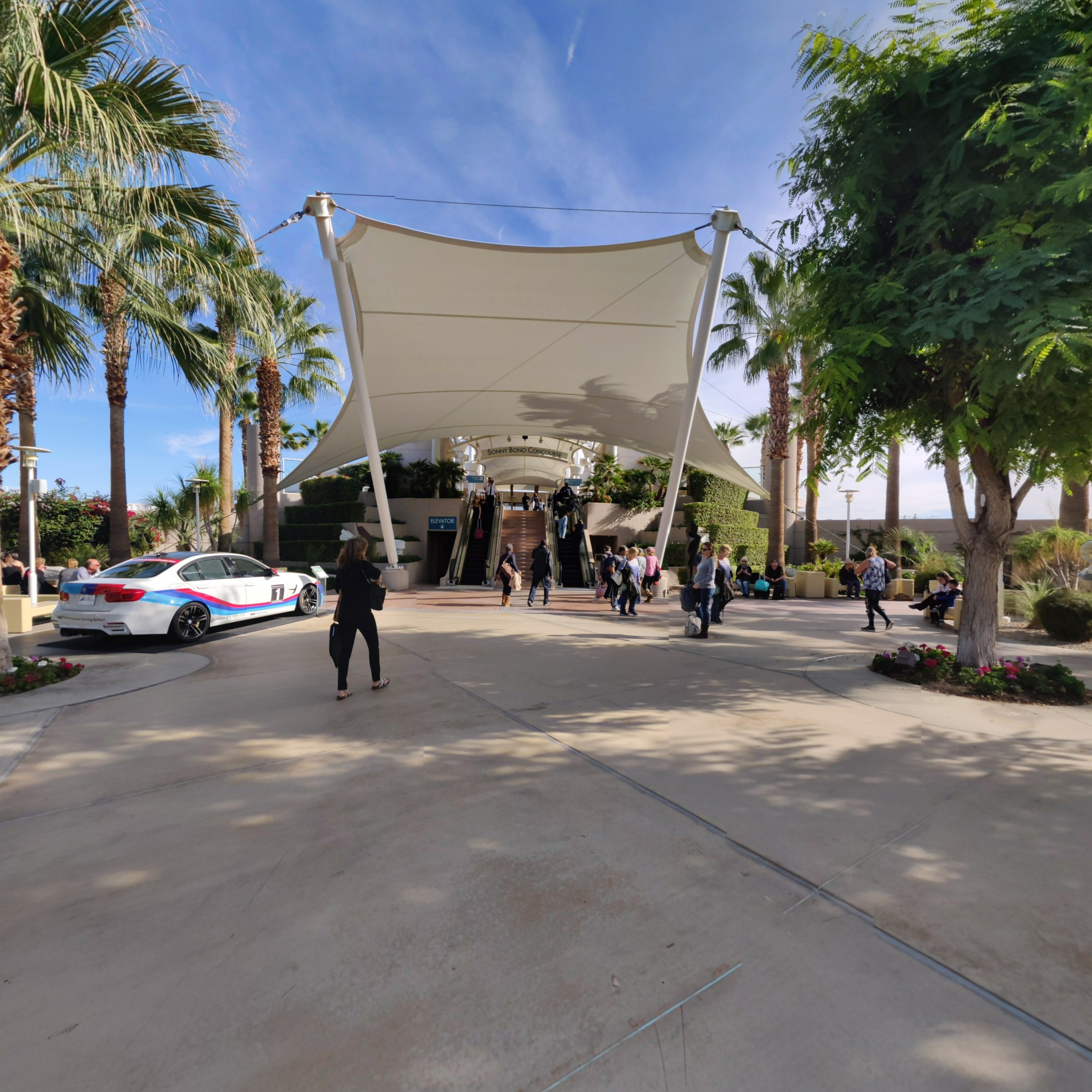
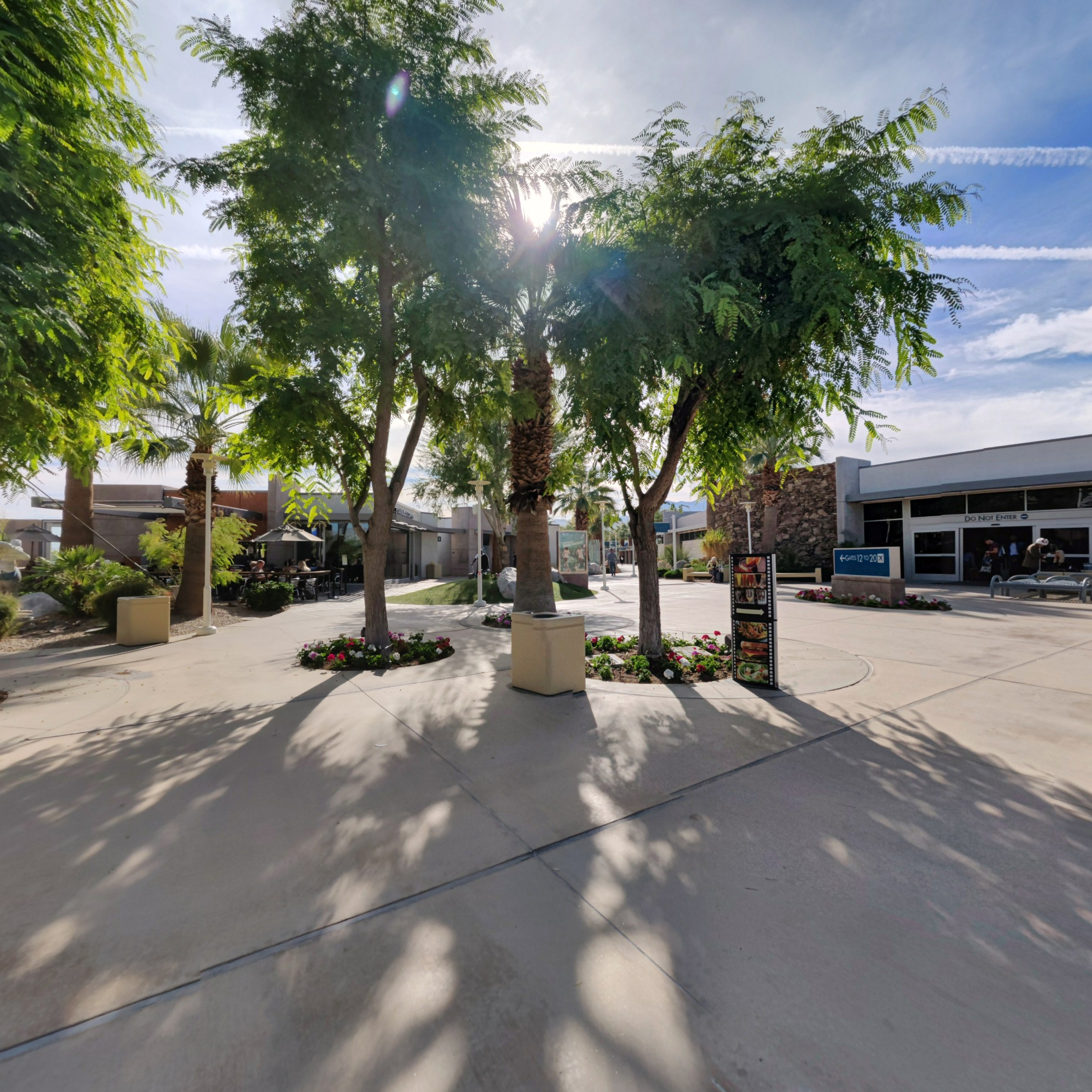
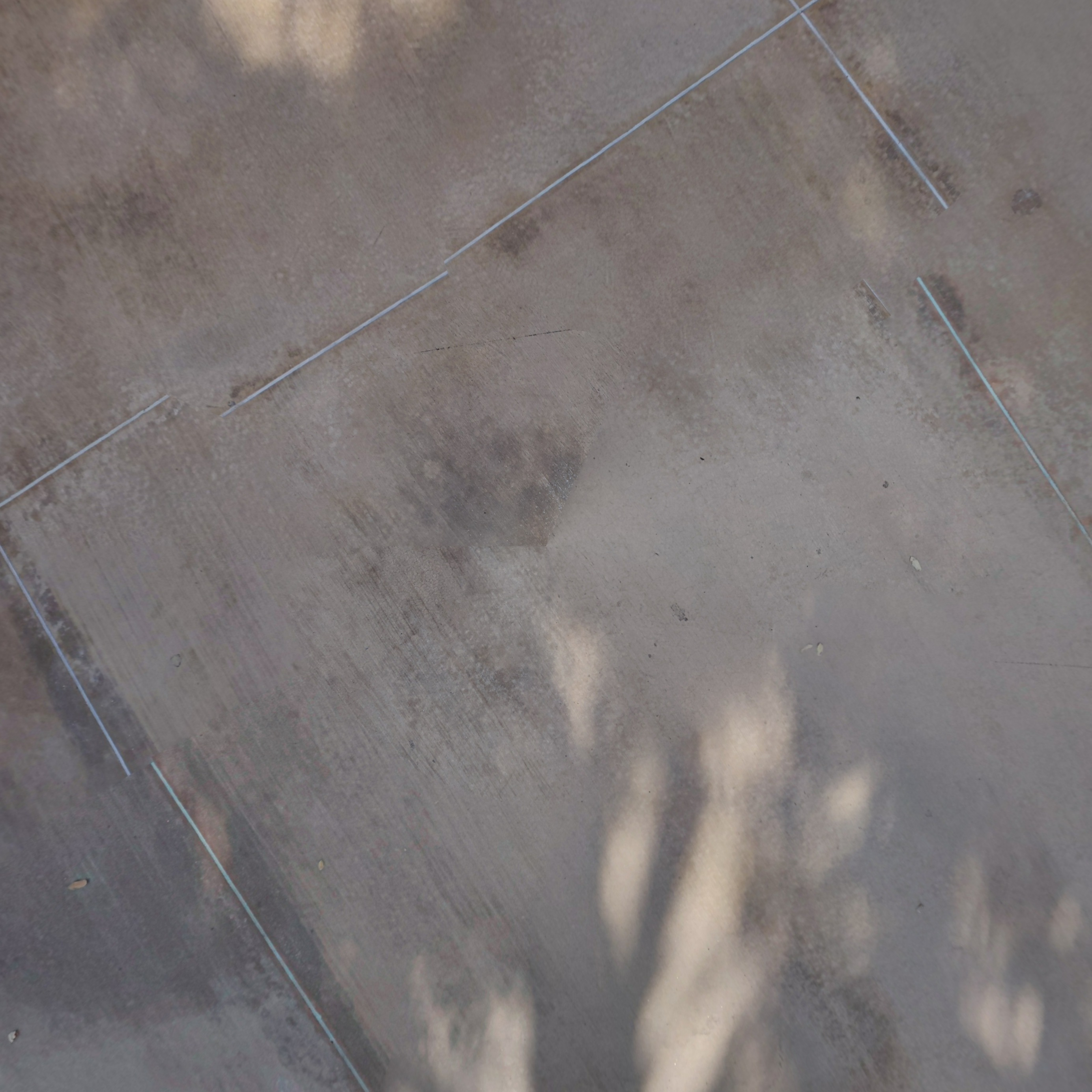
The main courtyard

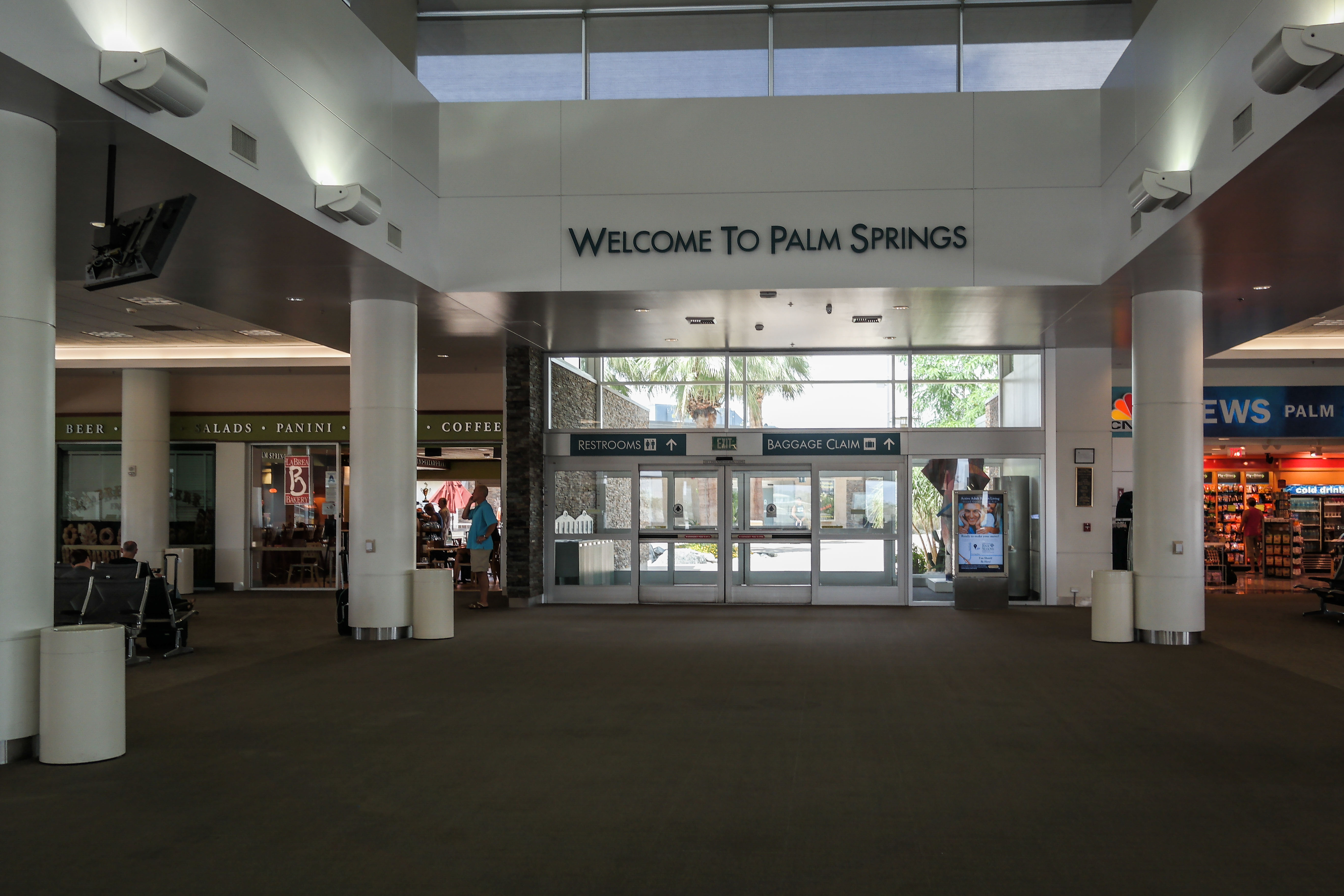
Courtyard

PSP's passenger terminal consists of three parts—the main building, the elevated Sonny Bono Concourse to the north, and the Agua Caliente Concourse to the south. The airport has 19 total gates. Airside, it has a unique open-air layout in that all passenger walkways connecting these structures are roofless.

=== Main Building ===
The main building is the land side of the airport. Road traffic accesses the airport directly off of Tahquitz Canyon Way (from downtown) or Kirk Douglas Way (from points east). Uncovered parking areas are directly in front of the building. The center section houses the security screening area and automatic doors to/from the open-air walkways airside. Ticketing is on the right (south) wing, while baggage claim and car rental counters are on the left (north). The main building opened in 1966 and was designed by Donald Wrexler.

=== Sonny Bono Concourse (Gates 4–11) ===
On November 4, 1999, the new Sonny Bono Concourse opened as part of the 1994–2000 expansion. Named in honor of the late singer, congressman and former mayor of the city, this concourse has 8 gates (all with jet bridges) and is the elevated one of the two. It is designed to handle larger aircraft (such as the Boeing 737 and the Airbus A320 family) because of its jet bridges. Although it is capable of handling aircraft as large as the Boeing 767, it is commonly used by the Boeing 737, Airbus A320 family, and the Embraer E175. SB's outdoor escalator and walkway are shaded by a designer roofline similar to that of the Denver International Airport.

=== Agua Caliente Concourse (Gates 12–20) ===
The older concourse on the south side, known as the Agua Caliente Concourse, or "Gates 12–20" on airport signage, is at the tarmac level and hosts smaller aircraft such as the Embraer ERJ and Bombardier CRJ. There are 11 gates, which are all hardstands, 6 of which are capable of handling larger aircraft (up to the Airbus A321) should the need arise. It also contains the airport's only hardstands for the Airbus A220. Boarding uses ramps or airstairs.

== Airlines and destinations ==
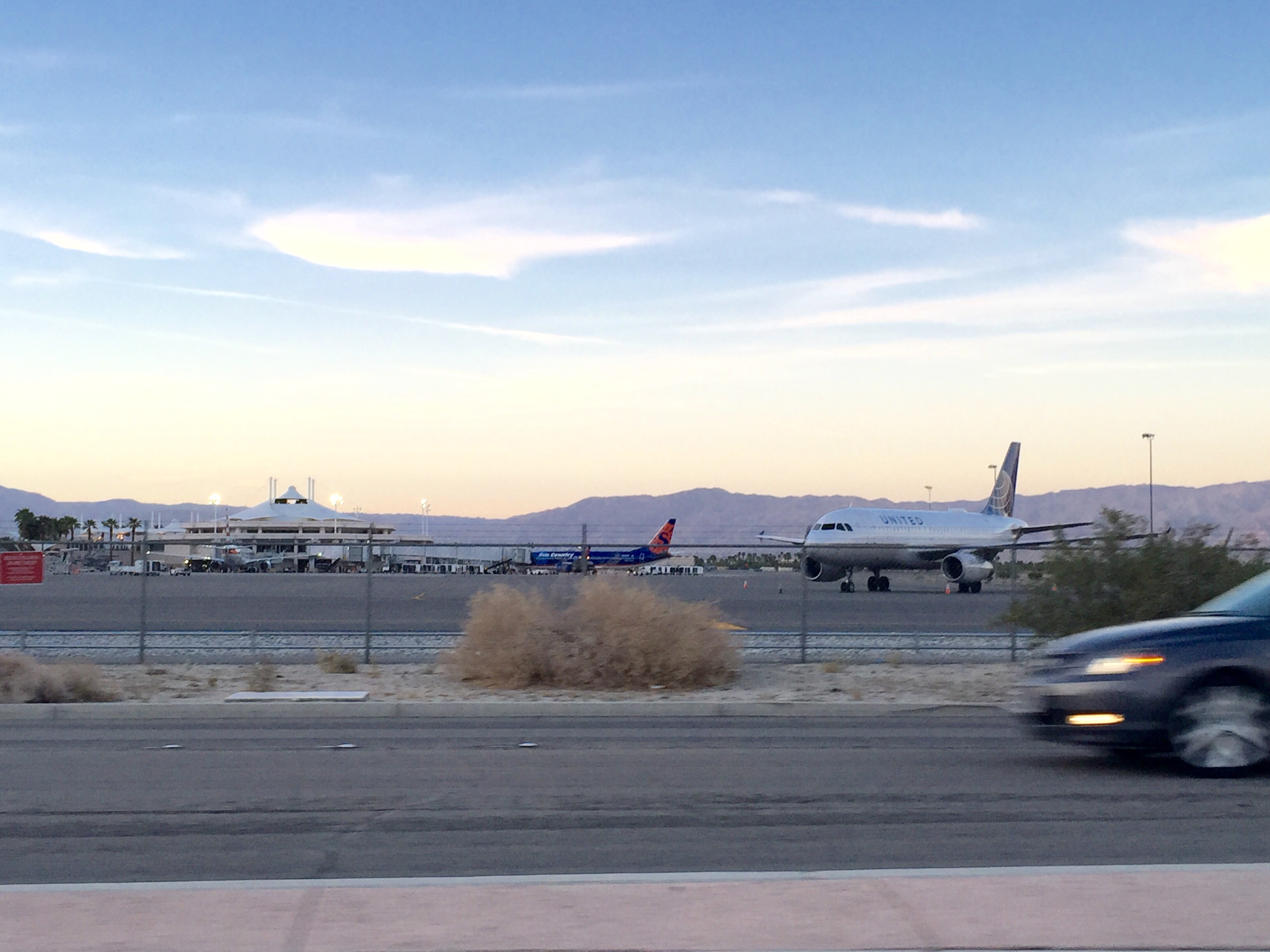
Sun Country and United Airlines jets at the airport

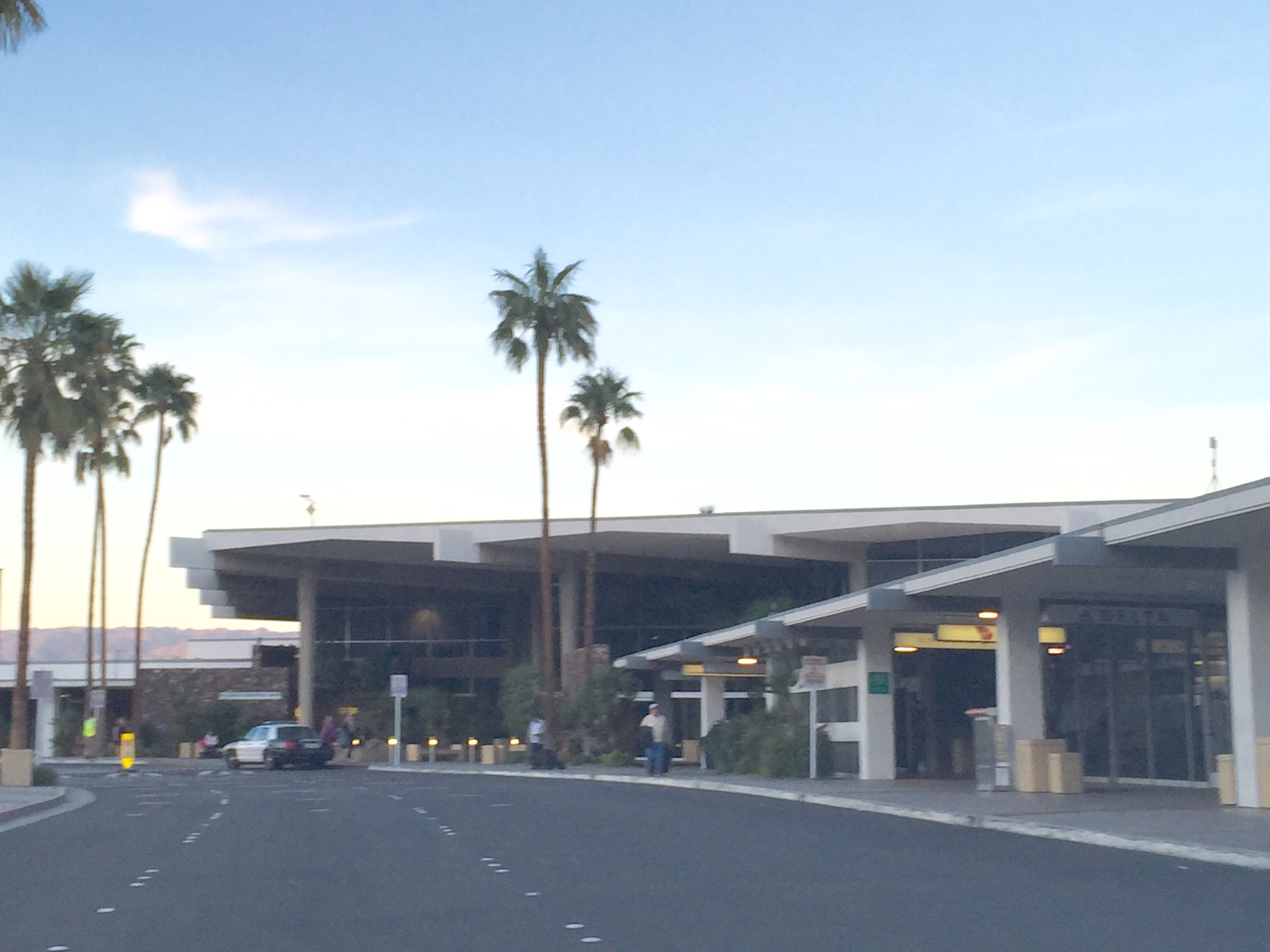
Sonny Bono Concourse

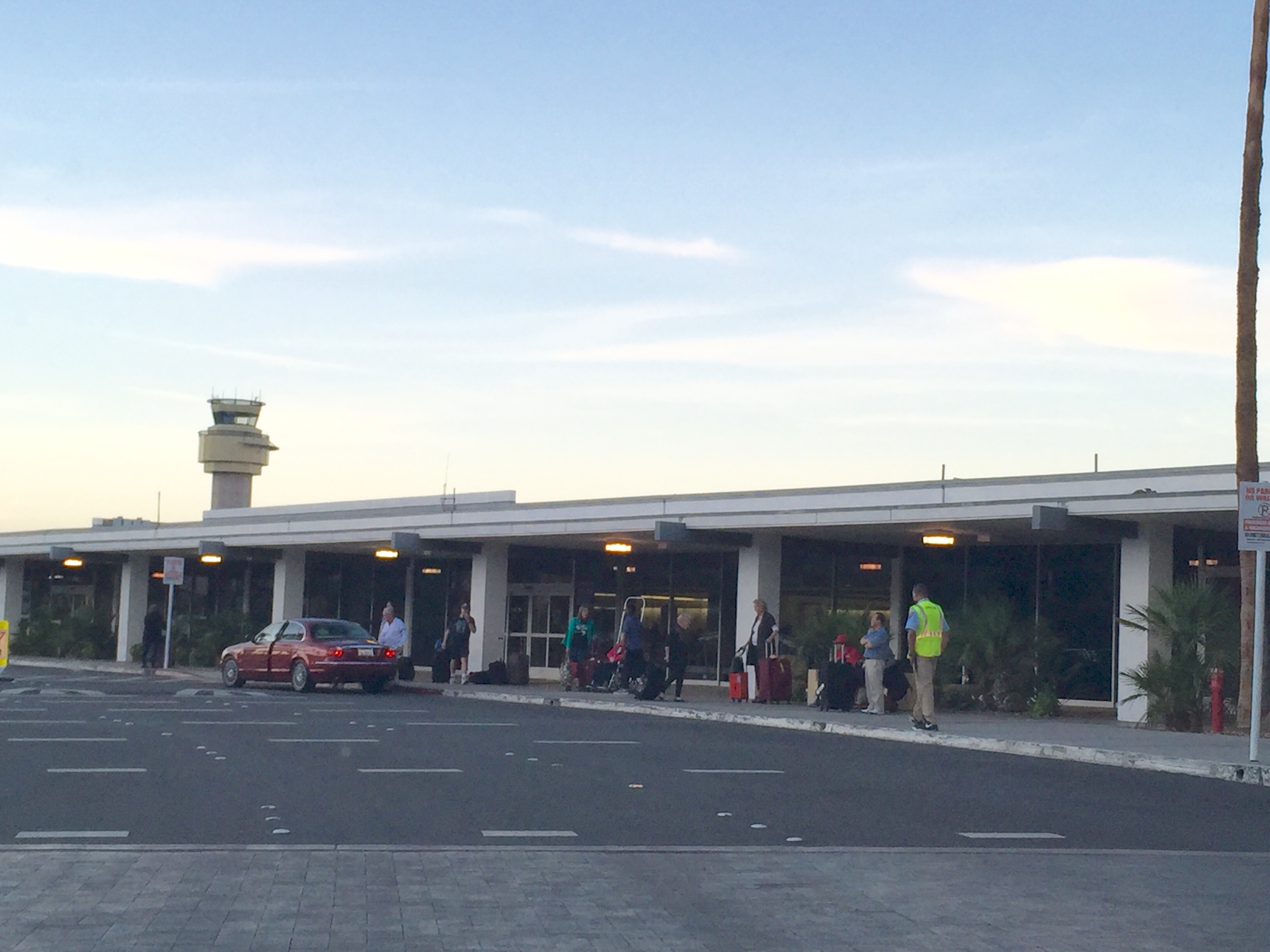
Palm Springs International Airport

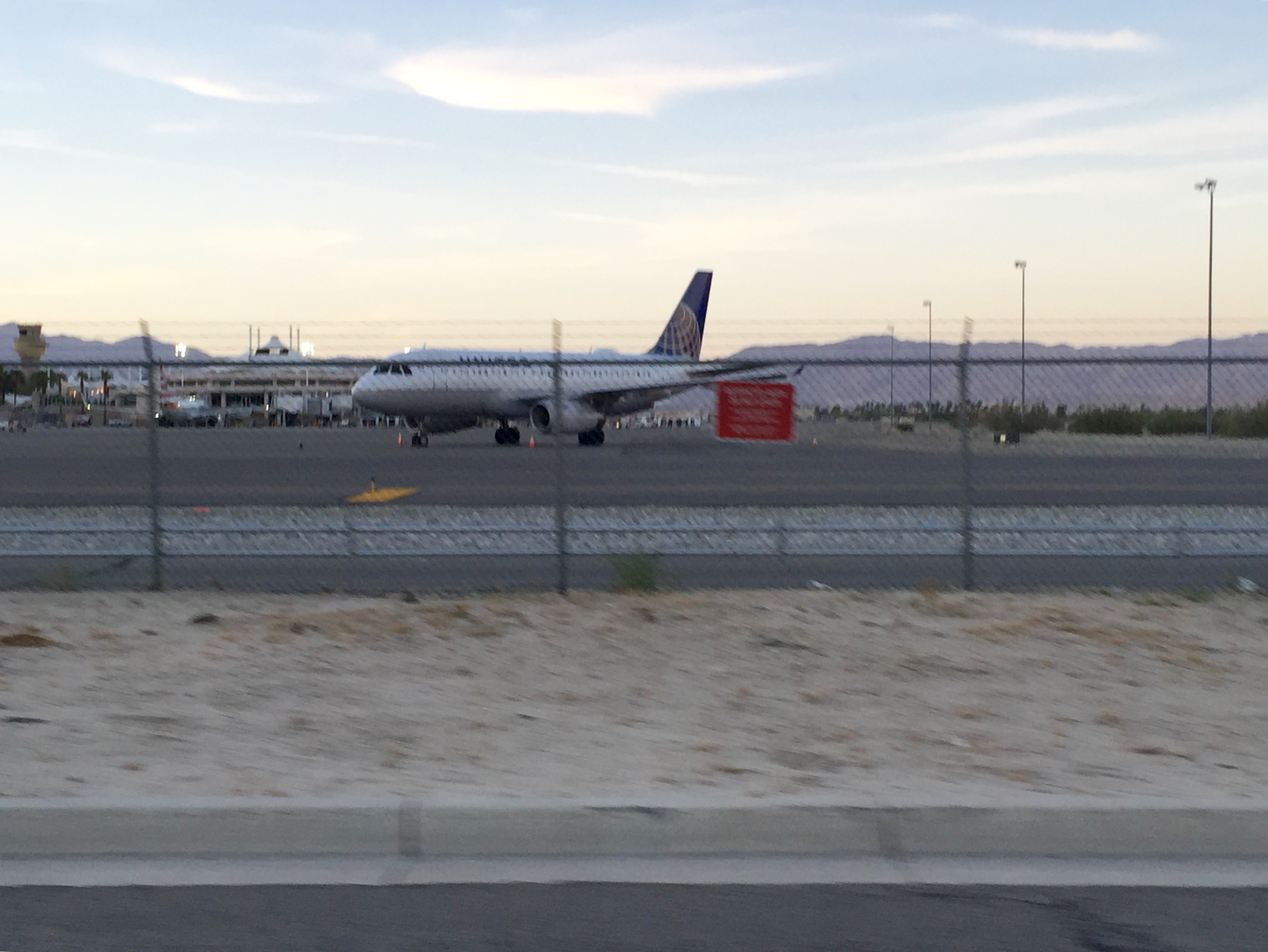
United Airlines Airbus A319 at the airport

=== Passenger ===
Airlines	Destinations
Air Canada	Seasonal: Vancouver
Air Canada Rouge	Seasonal: Toronto–Pearson
Alaska Airlines	Portland (OR), San Francisco, Seattle/Tacoma; Seasonal: Boise, Everett, New York–JFK, Santa Rosa
Allegiant Air	Bellingham; Seasonal: Des Moines
American Airlines	Dallas/Fort Worth, Phoenix–Sky Harbor; Seasonal: Charlotte, Chicago–O'Hare
American Eagle	Phoenix–Sky Harbor
Delta Air Lines	Seasonal: Atlanta, Minneapolis/St. Paul, New York–JFK (ends December 19, 2026), Salt Lake City, Seattle/Tacoma
Delta Connection	Salt Lake City; Seasonal: Austin
Flair Airlines	Seasonal: Vancouver
Porter Airlines	Seasonal: Toronto–Pearson
Southwest Airlines	Denver, Oakland, San Jose (CA)
United Airlines	Denver, San Francisco; Seasonal: Chicago–O'Hare, Newark, Washington–Dulles
United Express	Denver, San Francisco; Seasonal: Houston–Intercontinental, Los Angeles
WestJet	Calgary, Edmonton, Vancouver; Seasonal: Winnipeg

== Statistics ==
In the year ending December 31, 2018, the airport had 57,512 aircraft operations, average 158 per day: 41% general aviation, 37% airline, 19% air taxi, and 3% military. 81 aircraft at the time were based at the airport: 62 single-engine, 8 multi-engine, 10 jet, and 1 helicopter.

=== Annual traffic ===
PSP Airport Annual Passengers 2014–Present
Year	Passengers	% Change
2014	1,914,402	—
2015	1,888,657	▼1.3%
2016	1,998,206	▲5.8%
2017	2,100,072	▲5.1%
2018	2,327,018	▲10.8%
2019	2,563,955	▲10.2%
2020	1,252,094	▼51.2%
2021	2,092,943	▲67.2%
2022	2,981,844	▲42.5%
2023	3,237,325	▲8.6%
2024	3,230,914	▼0.2%
2025	3,307,140	▲2.4%

=== Top destinations ===
Busiest domestic routes from PSP (May 2025 – April 2026)
Rank	City	Passengers	Carriers
1	Denver, Colorado	195,450	Southwest, United
2	Seattle/Tacoma, Washington	187,910	Alaska, Delta
3	San Francisco, California	167,130	Alaska, United
4	Dallas/Fort Worth, Texas	148,500	American
5	Phoenix–Sky Harbor, Arizona	108,140	American, Southwest
6	Chicago–O'Hare, Illinois	101,860	American, United
7	Portland, Oregon	81,620	Alaska, Southwest
8	Las Vegas, Nevada	79,690	Southwest
9	Minneapolis/St. Paul, Minnesota	69,640	Delta, Sun Country
10	Salt Lake City, Utah	67,340	Delta

=== Airline Market Share ===
Largest airlines at PSP (May 2025 – April 2026)
Rank	Airline	Passengers	Share
1	SkyWest Airlines	650,000	22.09%
2	American Airlines	538,000	18.26%
3	Southwest Airlines	510,000	17.31%
4	Alaska Airlines	461,000	15.67%
5	United Airlines	397,000	13.50%
--	Other	388,000	13.18%

== Ground transportation ==
PSP is served by both municipal and regional routes. Sunline's SunBus routes 2 and 4 provide direct service to downtown Palm Springs via the bus stops at El Cielo/Kirk Douglas and Tahquitz/Civic. Morongo Basin Transit Authority provides service to Twentynine Palms. An Amtrak Thruway bus stop is located just outside the baggage claim area, with service to Cabazon (Morongo Casino), Riverside, and Fullerton Transportation Center, which is a one stop train ride from Los Angeles Union Station. The Idyllwild Shuttle provides weekly connections to Mountain Center and Idyllwild–Pine Cove.

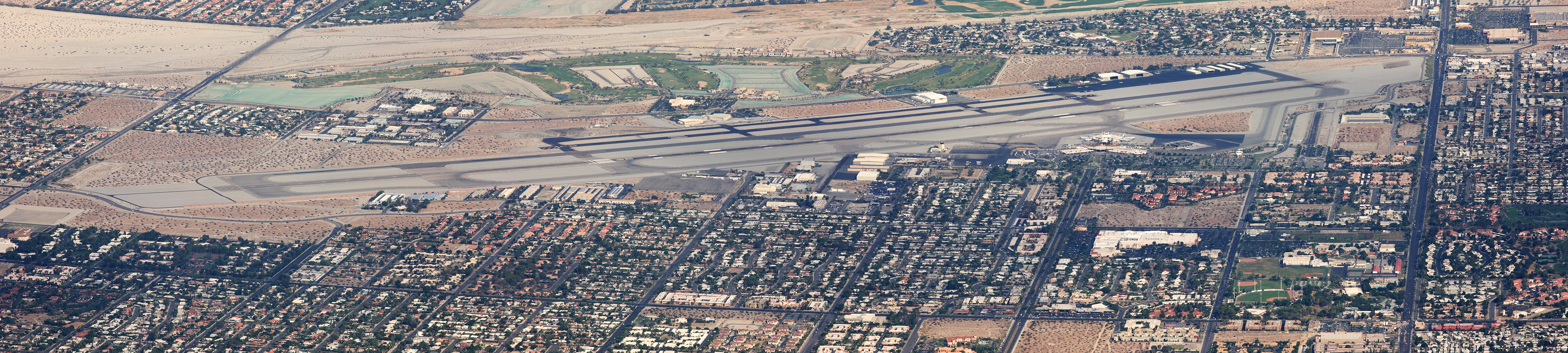
Palm Springs International Airport

== Accidents and incidents at or near PSP ==
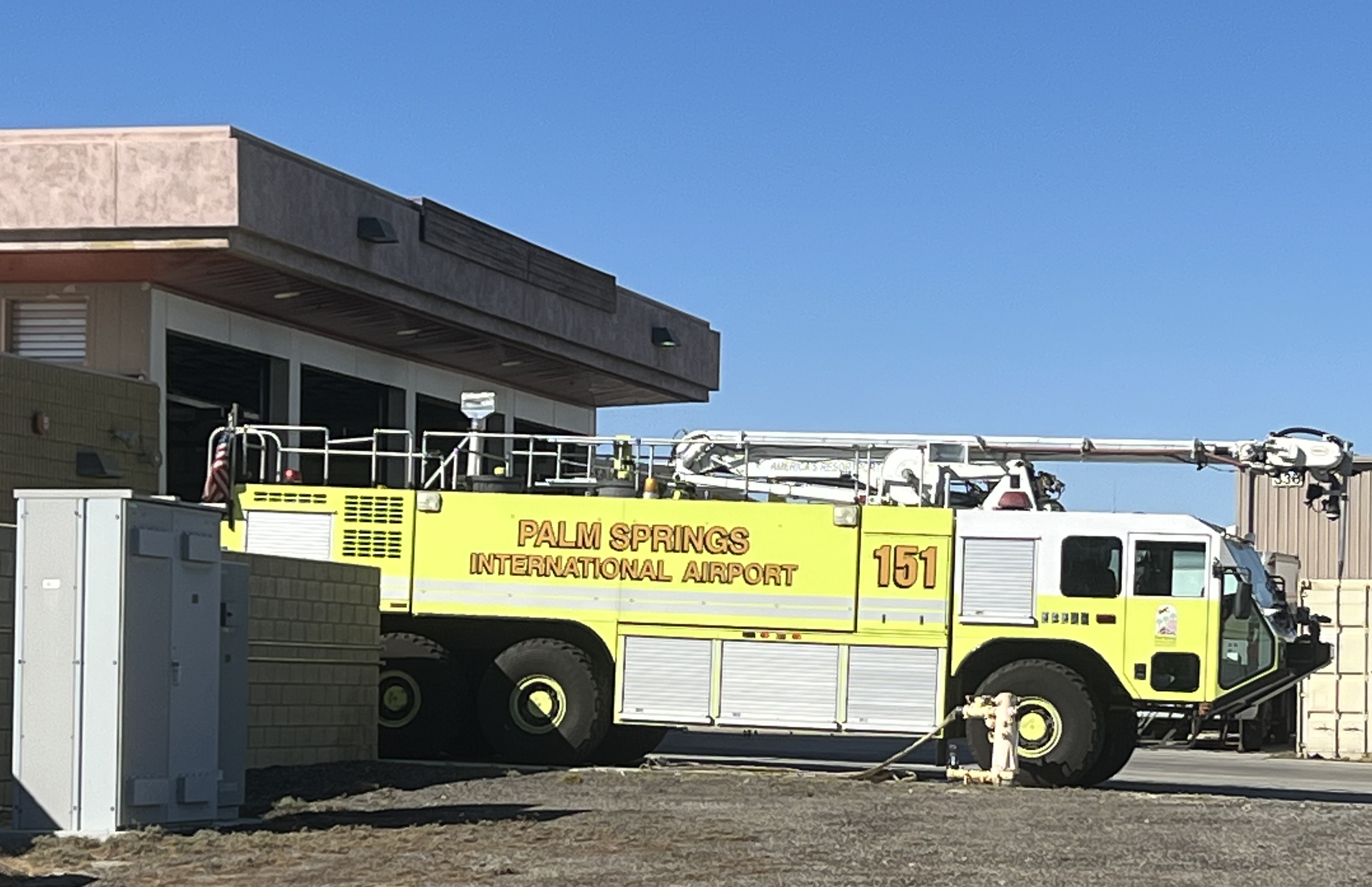
ARFF Vehicle at Palm Springs International Airport (2021)

- On October 23, 1942, American Airlines Flight 28, a Douglas DC-3 (reg. NC16017) en route to New York City, crashed in Chino Canyon, 3.1 miles (5 km) north of then Palm Springs Municipal Airport after being clipped by a United States Army Air Force Lockheed B-34 Ventura II bomber. All nine passengers and three crew were killed on the DC-3. The bomber (reg. 41–38116) landed safely at Palm Springs Municipal Airport with minor damage.
- On February 13, 1958, Western Airlines Flight 19, a Convair CV-240 crash-landed and was destroyed after striking boulders and large mounds of drifted sand on desert terrain 4.1 miles NNW of PSP due to separation of the right wing leading edge in flight. Of the 18 passengers and three crew, there were no fatalities, but five passengers were seriously injured, and most of the rest had minor injuries. The aircraft was heavily damaged and written off.
- On November 14, 1965, a Paul Kelly Flying Service Learjet 23 crashed 13.1 miles east of PSP at night when the aircraft lost control and crashed in a 55-degree nose-down vertical left bank attitude due to spatial disorientation of the pilot. Both crew and all six passengers died.
- On September 23, 1967, a Bird Corp. Oakland Centaurus, a modified Lockheed Ventura, crashed in the initial climb after the right engine failed. Both occupants survived, but the aircraft was written off.
- On January 6, 1977, a Jet Avia Learjet 24B impacted a mountain at 9,700 feet 21.9 miles NW of PSP en route to Las Vegas. The crew misinterpreted instrument flight rules clearance and air traffic control instructions, and maintained the runway heading. All four occupants (two crew, two passengers, one of them being Frank Sinatra's mother Dolly) were killed.
- On December 4, 2020, a Cessna 172N Skyhawk crashed nose-first onto the main runway during an emergency landing. The sole occupant, the pilot, was seriously injured and was rushed to a nearby hospital.

== See also ==
- California World War II Army Airfields
- Air Transport Command
- Palm Springs Air Museum
