= List of the busiest airports in the United States =

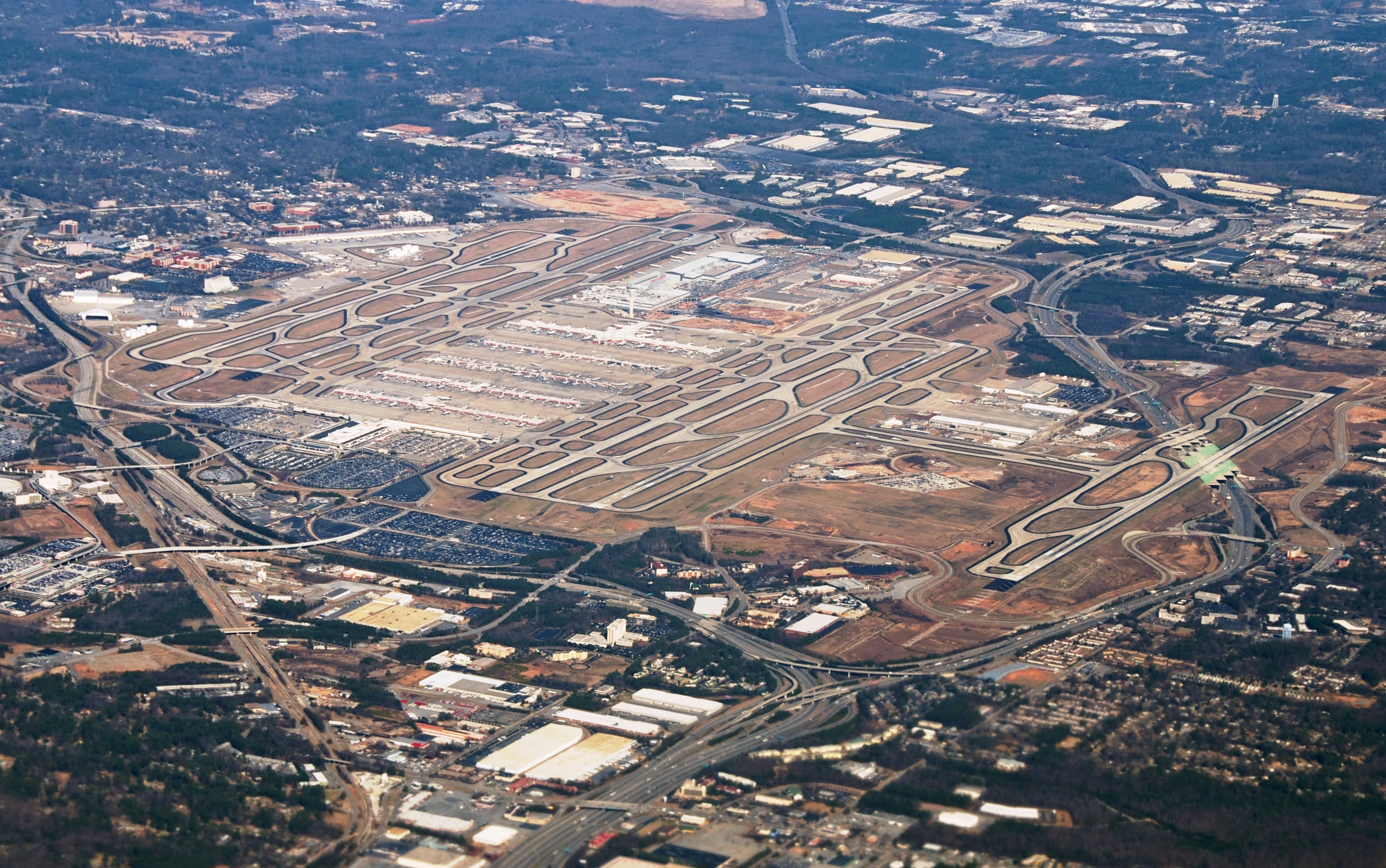
Hartsfield–Jackson Atlanta International Airport in the Atlanta metropolitan area, the world's and nation's busiest airport.

These are lists of the busiest airports in the United States, based on various ranking criteria.

== Busiest U.S. airports by total commercial aircraft enplanements ==
The FAA uses passenger boarding for a half calendar year to determine Airport Improvement Program (AIP) entitlements. The term "hub" is used by the FAA to identify busy commercial service airports (which are not necessarily considered airline hubs by the airlines serving them). Large hubs are the airports that each account for at least 1 percent of total U.S. passenger enplanements. Medium hubs are defined as airports that each account for between 0.25 percent and 1 percent of the total passenger enplanements.

=== Large hubs ===
Rank (2025)	Airports (large)	IATA Code	Major cities served	Metro area	State	2025	2024	2023	2022	2021	2020	2019	2018	2017	2016
1	Hartsfield–Jackson Atlanta International Airport	ATL	Atlanta	Metro Atlanta	GA	51,459,786	52,511,402	50,950,068	45,396,001	36,676,010	20,559,866	53,505,795	51,865,797	50,251,964	50,501,858
2	Dallas/Fort Worth International Airport	DFW	Dallas and Fort Worth	Dallas–Fort Worth	TX	41,297,009	42,351,316	39,246,212	35,345,138	30,005,266	18,593,421	35,778,573	32,821,799	31,816,933	31,283,579
3	O'Hare International Airport	ORD	Chicago	Chicago	IL	40,680,735	38,575,693	35,843,104	33,120,474	26,350,976	14,606,034	40,871,223	39,873,927	38,593,028	37,589,899
4	Denver International Airport	DEN	Denver	Greater Denver	CO	39,976,695	40,012,895	37,863,967	33,773,832	28,645,527	16,243,216	33,592,945	31,362,941	29,809,097	28,267,394
5	Los Angeles International Airport	LAX	Los Angeles	Greater Los Angeles	CA	36,497,303	37,760,834	40,956,673	32,326,616	23,663,410	14,055,777	42,939,104	42,624,050	41,232,432	39,636,042
6	John F. Kennedy International Airport	JFK	New York City	New York Metro	NY	30,792,806	31,466,102	30,804,355	27,154,885	15,273,342	8,269,819	31,036,655	30,620,769	29,533,154	29,239,151
7	Orlando International Airport	MCO	Orlando	Greater Orlando	FL	27,999,709	27,859,783	28,033,205	24,469,733	19,618,838	10,467,728	24,562,271	23,202,480	21,565,448	20,283,541
8	Harry Reid International Airport	LAS	Las Vegas	Las Vegas Valley	NV	26,531,765	28,244,966	27,896,199	25,480,500	19,160,342	10,584,059	24,728,361	23,795,012	23,364,393	22,833,267
9	Miami International Airport	MIA	Miami	Miami Metro	FL	26,450,972	26,588,002	24,717,048	23,949,892	17,500,096	8,786,007	21,421,031	21,021,640	20,709,225	20,875,813
10	San Francisco International Airport	SFO	San Francisco	San Francisco Bay Area	CA	26,251,850	25,078,968	24,191,159	20,411,420	11,725,347	7,745,057	27,779,230	27,790,717	26,900,048	25,707,101
11	Charlotte Douglas International Airport	CLT	Charlotte	Greater Charlotte	NC	25,873,555	28,523,822	25,896,224	23,100,300	20,900,875	12,952,869	24,199,688	22,281,949	22,011,251	21,511,880
12	Seattle–Tacoma International Airport	SEA	Seattle and Tacoma	Seattle Metro	WA	25,417,071	25,414,592	24,594,210	22,157,862	17,430,195	9,462,411	25,001,762	24,024,908	22,639,124	21,887,110
13	Phoenix Sky Harbor International Airport	PHX	Phoenix	Metro Phoenix	AZ	25,094,817	25,595,723	23,880,504	21,852,586	18,940,287	10,531,436	22,433,552	21,622,580	21,185,458	20,896,265
14	Newark Liberty International Airport	EWR	Newark and New York City	New York Metro	NJ	23,464,492	24,544,320	24,575,320	21,774,690	14,514,049	7,985,474	23,160,763	22,797,602	21,571,198	19,923,009
15	George Bush Intercontinental Airport	IAH	Houston	Greater Houston	TX	23,265,028	23,349,157	22,228,844	19,814,052	16,242,821	8,682,558	21,905,309	21,157,398	19,603,731	20,062,072
16	Logan International Airport	BOS	Boston	Greater Boston	MA	21,021,153	21,090,721	19,962,678	17,443,775	10,909,817	6,035,452	20,699,377	20,006,521	18,759,742	17,759,044
17	Minneapolis–Saint Paul International Airport	MSP	Minneapolis and Saint Paul	Minneapolis–Saint Paul	MN	17,488,261	18,054,481	17,019,128	15,242,089	12,211,409	7,069,720	19,192,917	18,361,942	18,409,704	18,123,844
18	Detroit Metropolitan Airport	DTW	Detroit	Detroit Metro	MI	16,294,768	16,110,696	15,378,601	13,751,197	11,517,696	6,822,324	18,143,040	17,436,837	17,036,092	16,847,135
19	LaGuardia Airport	LGA	New York City	New York Metro	NY	16,278,532	16,715,567	16,173,073	14,367,463	7,827,307	4,147,116	15,393,601	15,058,501	14,614,802	14,762,593
20	Fort Lauderdale–Hollywood International Airport	FLL	Fort Lauderdale and Hollywood	Miami Metro	FL	15,646,752	17,096,131	17,063,063	15,370,165	13,598,994	8,015,744	17,950,989	17,612,331	15,817,043	14,263,270
21	Philadelphia International Airport	PHL	Philadelphia	Philadelphia Metro	PA	14,779,849	15,102,261	13,656,189	12,421,168	9,820,222	5,753,239	16,006,389	15,292,670	14,271,243	14,564,419
22	Dulles International Airport	IAD	Washington, D.C.	Washington Metro	VA	13,859,569	13,003,234	12,073,571	10,266,324	7,227,875	3,862,658	11,884,117	11,621,623	11,024,306	10,596,942
23	Salt Lake City International Airport	SLC	Salt Lake City	Wasatch Front	UT	13,429,096	13,543,570	12,905,368	12,383,843	10,795,906	5,753,239	12,840,841	12,226,730	11,615,954	11,143,738
24	San Diego International Airport	SAN	San Diego	Greater San Diego	CA	12,675,684	12,780,013	12,190,183	11,162,224	7,836,360	4,637,856	12,648,692	12,174,224	11,139,933	10,340,164
25	Nashville International Airport	BNA	Nashville	Greater Nashville	TN	12,549,304	12,058,688	11,227,243	9,829,062	7,594,049	4,013,995	8,935,654	8,017,347	6,902,771	6,338,517
26	Baltimore/Washington International Airport	BWI	Baltimore and Washington, D.C.	Baltimore metropolitan area	MD	12,274,134	13,221,461	12,849,721	11,151,169	9,253,561	5,451,355	13,284,687	13,371,816	12,976,554	12,340,972
27	Tampa International Airport	TPA	Tampa	Tampa Bay area	FL	12,110,427	12,075,591	11,677,632	10,539,459	8,847,197	4,966,775	10,978,756	10,368,514	9,548,580	9,194,994
28	Ronald Reagan Washington National Airport	DCA	Washington, D.C.	Washington Metro	VA	12,003,594	12,750,892	12,365,030	11,553,850	6,731,737	3,573,489	11,595,454	11,367,176	11,506,310	11,470,854
29	Austin–Bergstrom International Airport	AUS	Austin	Greater Austin	TX	10,651,727	10,678,073	10,833,443	10,382,573	6,666,215	3,141,505	8,683,711	7,921,797	6,973,115	6,095,545
30	Daniel K. Inouye International Airport	HNL	Honolulu	Oahu	HI	10,430,353	10,449,022	10,149,761	8,828,395	5,830,928	3,126,391	9,988,678	9,578,505	9,743,989	9,656,340

=== Medium hubs ===
Rank (2025)	Airports (medium hubs)	IATA Code	City served	Metro Area	State	2025	2024	2023	2022	2021	2020	2019	2018	2017	2016
31	Midway International Airport	MDW	Chicago	Chicago	IL	9,367,712	10,360,093	10,659,520	9,650,281	7,680,617	4,236,603	10,081,781	10,678,018	10,912,074	11,044,387
32	Portland International Airport	PDX	Portland	Portland	OR	9,054,394	8,639,088	8,123,054	7,241,882	5,759,879	3,455,877	9,797,408	9,940,866	9,435,473	9,071,154
33	Dallas Love Field	DAL	Dallas	Dallas–Fort Worth	TX	8,151,354	8,654,991	8,559,052	7,819,129	6,487,563	3,669,930	8,408,457	8,134,848	7,876,769	7,554,596
34	Raleigh–Durham International Airport	RDU	Raleigh	Research Triangle	NC	7,670,956	7,584,394	7,119,040	5,849,665	4,311,049	2,337,496	6,919,429	6,416,822	5,851,004	5,401,714
35	St. Louis Lambert International Airport	STL	St. Louis	St. Louis	MO	7,483,526	7,807,362	7,307,561	6,709,080	5,070,471	3,041,765	7,946,986	7,822,274	7,372,805	6,793,076
36	Sacramento International Airport	SMF	Sacramento	Sacramento	CA	6,805,910	6,679,426	6,371,910	6,040,824	4,760,275	2,710,342	6,454,413	6,031,630	5,460,526	4,969,366
37	William P. Hobby Airport	HOU	Houston	Houston	TX	6,790,274	7,116,967	6,800,329	6,462,948	5,560,780	3,127,178	7,069,614	6,937,061	6,741,870	6,285,181
38	Luis Muñoz Marín International Airport	SJU	San Juan	San Juan	PR	6,658,037	6,490,669	5,985,001	5,039,771	4,738,725	2,362,851	4,590,117	4,033,412	4,163,587	4,343,354
39	Louis Armstrong New Orleans International Airport	MSY	New Orleans	New Orleans	LA	6,221,146	6,537,092	6,309,212	5,931,899	4,017,147	2,632,606	6,717,105	6,565,482	6,005,527	5,569,705
40	Kansas City International Airport	MCI	Kansas City	Kansas City	MO	5,613,974	5,915,078	5,654,068	4,796,476	3,795,290	2,167,616	5,759,419	5,935,131	5,744,918	5,391,557
41	John Wayne Airport	SNA	Santa Ana	Greater Los Angeles	CA	5,521,729	5,370,273	5,706,332	5,536,313	3,807,205	1,824,836	5,153,276	5,317,149	5,195,047	5,217,242
42	Southwest Florida International Airport	RSW	Fort Myers	Southwest Florida	FL	5,504,420	5,425,293	4,963,269	5,132,694	5,080,805	2,947,139	5,144,467	4,719,568	4,461,304	4,350,650
43	Norman Y. Mineta San José International Airport	SJC	San Jose	San Francisco Bay Area	CA	5,257,421	5,822,019	5,958,855	5,590,137	3,619,690	2,283,186	7,828,885	7,140,616	6,225,148	5,321,603
44	San Antonio International Airport	SAT	San Antonio	San Antonio	TX	5,237,816	5,466,684	5,336,684	4,751,610	3,677,643	1,919,958	5,022,980	4,844,427	4,521,611	4,179,994
45	Indianapolis International Airport	IND	Indianapolis	Indianapolis	IN	5,221,447	5,181,947	4,788,376	4,209,416	3,487,100	1,989,126	4,709,183	4,695,040	4,376,432	4,216,766
46	Cleveland Hopkins International Airport	CLE	Cleveland	Cleveland	OH	4,855,943	4,950,345	4,803,822	4,237,795	3,552,402	1,990,156	4,894,541	4,836,580	4,562,740	4,205,739
47	Pittsburgh International Airport	PIT	Pittsburgh	Pittsburgh	PA	4,792,035	4,862,376	4,493,052	3,918,968	3,069,259	1,742,406	4,715,947	4,670,033	4,327,431	3,986,114
48	Oakland San Francisco Bay Airport	OAK	Oakland	San Francisco Bay Area	CA	4,532,494	5,292,736	5,520,812	5,506,232	4,011,953	2,271,294	6,560,230	6,798,321	6,530,308	5,934,639
49	John Glenn Columbus International Airport	CMH	Columbus	Columbus	OH	4,396,625	4,387,395	4,095,189	3,618,555	2,825,259	1,577,596	4,172,067	4,054,572	3,765,007	3,567,864
50	Cincinnati/Northern Kentucky International Airport	CVG	Cincinnati	Cincinnati	KY	4,366,865	4,500,414	4,287,722	3,702,997	3,050,597	1,729,395	4,413,457	4,269,258	3,926,158	3,269,979
51	President Donald J. Trump International Airport	DJT	West Palm Beach	Miami Metro	FL	4,257,185	4,127,211	3,815,977	3,257,730	2,567,897	1,518,732	3,460,429	3,263,042	3,166,532	3,100,624
52	Jacksonville International Airport	JAX	Jacksonville	Jacksonville	FL	3,719,723	3,749,791	3,619,739	3,177,393	2,425,685	1,367,501	3,479,923	3,118,540	2,759,067	2,799,587
53	Ontario International Airport	ONT	Ontario	Greater Los Angeles	CA	3,473,874	3,494,554	3,181,161	2,840,758	2,201,528	1,237,946	2,723,002	2,499,171	2,247,645	2,127,387
54	Kahului Airport	OGG	Kahului	Maui	HI	3,450,472	3,415,615	3,745,866	4,125,311	2,933,315	1,135,141	3,791,807	3,572,133	3,442,189	3,352,813
55	Bradley International Airport	BDL	Hartford	Hartford	CT	3,283,397	3,285,194	3,122,212	2,844,713	2,273,259	1,150,033	3,323,614	3,330,734	3,214,976	2,982,194
56	Hollywood Burbank Airport	BUR	Burbank	Greater Los Angeles	CA	3,218,222	3,383,237	3,132,029	3,054,729	1,942,417	1,056,838	2,988,720	2,680,240	2,402,106	2,077,892
57	Charleston International Airport	CHS	Charleston	Charleston	SC	3,142,402	3,115,194	3,032,768	2,608,497	2,015,277	944,660	2,375,868	2,192,893	1,945,699	1,811,695
58	Milwaukee Mitchell International Airport	MKE	Milwaukee	Milwaukee	WI	2,889,040	3,104,054	2,959,840	2,671,281	2,231,010	1,263,385	3,374,073	3,548,817	3,452,544	3,383,271
59	Ted Stevens Anchorage International Airport	ANC	Anchorage	Anchorage	AK	2,729,285	2,767,856	2,681,818	2,604,308	2,184,959	1,157,301	2,713,843	2,642,901	2,556,188	2,563,524
60	Boise Airport	BOI	Boise	Boise	ID	2,579,647	2,475,370	2,369,164	2,230,467	1,809,000	991,241	2,057,750	1,943,181	1,777,642	1,633,507
61	Eppley Airfield	OMA	Omaha	Omaha	NE	2,565,135	2,583,212	2,464,418	2,204,395	1,829,912	1,036,245	2,455,274	2,457,087	2,303,223	2,127,387
62	Albuquerque International Sunport	ABQ	Albuquerque	Albuquerque	NM	2,562,028	2,690,218	2,605,163	2,317,836	1,688,646	868,922	2,641,450	2,647,269	2,412,328	2,341,719
63	Buffalo Niagara International Airport	BUF	Buffalo	Buffalo–Niagara Falls	NY	2,533,180	2,499,295	2,291,995	2,007,508	1,427,891	703,401	2,459,199	2,523,158	2,348,512	2,313,724
64	Richmond International Airport	RIC	Richmond	Greater Richmond Region	VA	2,481,863	2,456,422	2,399,239	2,042,834	1,603,149	847,811	2,190,907	2,048,691	1,822,486	1,777,648
65	Norfolk International Airport	ORF	Norfolk	Norfolk	VA	2,466,474	2,444,897	2,307,899	2,065,116	1,658,024	884,882	1,990,864	1,846,031	1,694,329	1,602,631

== Busiest U.S. airports by international passenger traffic ==
Rank	Airport name	Location	IATA Code	2025	2024	2023	2022	2021	2020	2019
1	John F. Kennedy International Airport	Queens, New York	JFK	33,967,985	34,765,387	32,481,057	25,178,878	12,466,165	8,219,317	33,432,159
2	Los Angeles International Airport	Los Angeles, California	LAX	23,524,781	23,438,418	21,503,227	15,940,358	7,862,532	6,246,602	25,210,140
3	Miami International Airport	Miami, Florida	MIA	22,919,714	23,202,731	21,382,328	18,985,551	11,592,445	6,565,834	20,735,658
4	San Francisco International Airport	South San Francisco, California	SFO	15,383,418	15,083,931	13,224,356	9,298,781	3,139,041	3,210,024	14,357,960
5	Newark Liberty International Airport	Newark, New Jersey	EWR	15,105,361	14,690,370	14,080,779	11,344,732	6,250,880	3,688,541	14,087,622
6	O'Hare International Airport	Chicago, Illinois	ORD	14,384,436	13,865,434	13,152,578	10,746,991	5,148,494	3,481,860	13,412,885
7	Hartsfield–Jackson Atlanta International Airport	College Park, Georgia	ATL	14,283,462	13,813,088	12,088,444	9,543,318	5,474,264	3,347,184	12,268,779
8	Dallas/Fort Worth International Airport	Grapevine, Texas	DFW	12,185,973	11,841,330	10,691,190	8,992,922	5,852,397	3,268,822	9,103,438
9	George Bush Intercontinental Airport	Houston, Texas	IAH	12,055,255	11,675,134	11,279,214	9,124,043	6,458,473	3,491,935	10,764,589
10	Washington Dulles International Airport	Dulles, Virginia	IAD	10,228,515	10,060,851	8,963,807	6,690,447	3,230,027	1,917,510	7,990,292
11	Logan International Airport	Boston, Massachusetts	BOS	9,062,437	8,491,518	7,651,625	5,459,853	2,046,561	1,574,712	7,534,504
12	Orlando International Airport	Orlando, Florida	MCO	8,028,582	7,610,776	6,696,949	5,214,203	1,837,706	1,525,177	6,957,048
13	Seattle–Tacoma International Airport	SeaTac, Washington	SEA	6,734,655	6,056,779	5,517,422	4,004,180	1,393,603	1,273,179	5,392,147
14	Fort Lauderdale–Hollywood International Airport	Fort Lauderdale, Florida	FLL	5,873,695	6,897,993	7,430,312	6,125,500	4,016,553	2,839,383	8,524,251
15	Denver International Airport	Denver, Colorado	DEN	4,673,906	4,444,671	3,823,871	3,222,132	1,856,124	934,563	3,037,012
16	Charlotte Douglas International Airport	Charlotte, North Carolina	CLT	4,545,182	4,623,143	4,140,531	3,183,695	1,989,704	1,069,001	3,405,907
17	Philadelphia International Airport	Philadelphia, Pennsylvania	PHL	3,891,292	3,704,176	3,518,548	2,613,240	988,733	682,030	3,847,253
18	Daniel K. Inouye International Airport	Honolulu, Hawaii	HNL	3,613,269	3,533,266	3,134,548	1,565,985	167,502	1,052,697	5,207,875
19	Detroit Metropolitan Wayne County Airport	Romulus, Michigan	DTW	3,523,059	3,353,501	2,835,905	2,092,098	966,375	873,744	3,717,775
20	Minneapolis–Saint Paul International Airport	Fort Snelling, Minnesota	MSP	3,438,125	3,320,850	2,817,694	1,942,385	673,759	835,721	3,144,386
21	Harry Reid International Airport	Paradise, Nevada	LAS	3,383,850	3,592,102	3,133,224	2,439,479	738,257	711,614	3,462,627
22	Phoenix Sky Harbor International Airport	Phoenix, Arizona	PHX	2,714,048	2,821,736	2,481,029	1,957,189	1,223,856	750,138	1,958,468
23	Luis Muñoz Marín International Airport	San Juan, Puerto Rico	SJU	1,618,139	1,458,172	1,158,996	802,613	468,287	253,114	866,088
24	Tampa International Airport	Tampa, Florida	TPA	1,594,254	1,384,192	1,178,288	780,245	167,847	258,738	1,039,740
25	LaGuardia Airport	Queens, New York	LGA	1,542,137	1,686,395	1,793,314	1,334,733	309,217	393,011	2,206,518
26	Antonio B. Won Pat International Airport	Tamuning, Guam	GUM	1,489,480	1,342,793	1,192,615	557,359	98,630	431,890	2,327,930
27	Salt Lake City International Airport	Salt Lake City, Utah	SLC	1,321,407	1,311,617	1,250,372	846,680	578,710	302,640	1,034,704
28	Baltimore/Washington International Airport	Linthicum Heights, Maryland	BWI	1,079,095	1,156,882	1,201,948	1,006,908	651,636	341,035	1,104,208
29	Austin–Bergstrom International Airport	Austin, Texas	AUS	1,058,414	1,064,668	987,214	818,072	230,835	81,433	512,989
30	San Diego International Airport	San Diego, California	SAN	1,003,809	995,537	904,162	538,005	200,233	247,218	1,044,516
31	William P. Hobby Airport	Houston, Texas	HOU	845,070	946,992	955,345	904,546	661,253	321,176	840,786
32	Oakland San Francisco Bay Airport	Oakland, California	OAK	812,917	606,917	473,750	357,265	288,027	217,048	731,025
33	Portland International Airport	Portland, Oregon	PDX	755,603	807,923	752,880	389,052	189,255	213,016	832,203
34	Raleigh–Durham International Airport	Raleigh, North Carolina	RDU	734,826	480,536	418,785	-	-	-	374,396
35	San Antonio International Airport	San Antonio, Texas	SAT	727,972	712,318	625,072	560,331	694,522	172,443	459,211
36	Midway International Airport	Chicago, Illinois	MDW	723,458	708,877	781,781	714,404	548,399	270,060	777,616
37	Nashville International Airport	Nashville, Tennessee	BNA	593,018	509,117	-	-	-	-	-
38	Norman Y. Mineta San José International Airport	San Jose, California	SJC	566,413	634,710	709,090	432,517	380,395	303,666	851,839
39	Ontario International Airport	Ontario, California	ONT	516,135	-	410,859	-	105,666	92,198	-
40	Sacramento International Airport	Sacramento, California	SMF	491,364	-	-	331,846	273,518	174,195	-

== Busiest U.S. airports by total cargo throughput ==
Listed according to data compiled by the Federal Aviation Administration for the United States and ranked according to total cargo throughput in pounds during 2024.

Rank	Airport name	Location	IATA code	Cargo	
Rank	Airport name	Location	IATA code	Ibs.	% chg. 2023/2024
1	Ted Stevens Anchorage International Airport	Anchorage, Alaska	ANC	25,468,126,865	▼-0.365%
2	Memphis International Airport	Memphis, Tennessee	MEM	21,215,155,555	▼-7.57%
3	Louisville Muhammad Ali International Airport	Louisville, Kentucky	SDF	17,985,026,483	▲5.45%
4	Miami International Airport	Miami, Florida	MIA	11,700,251,448	▲2.04%
5	Cincinnati/Northern Kentucky International Airport	Hebron, Kentucky	CVG	9,797,422,964	▼-8.60%
6	Los Angeles International Airport	Los Angeles, California	LAX	8,348,397,632	▼-3.16%
7	O'Hare International Airport	Chicago, Illinois	ORD	8,158,909,140	▲12.38%
8	Ontario International Airport	Ontario, California	ONT	4,825,318,232	▲5.78%
9	John F. Kennedy International Airport	New York, New York	JFK	4,791,225,787	▼-3.14%
10	Indianapolis International Airport	Indianapolis, Indiana	IND	4,489,767,935	▼-12.841%

== See also ==
- List of airports in the United States
- List of the busiest airports in California
- List of busiest airports by passenger traffic
