= Air21 =

Short-lived American airline

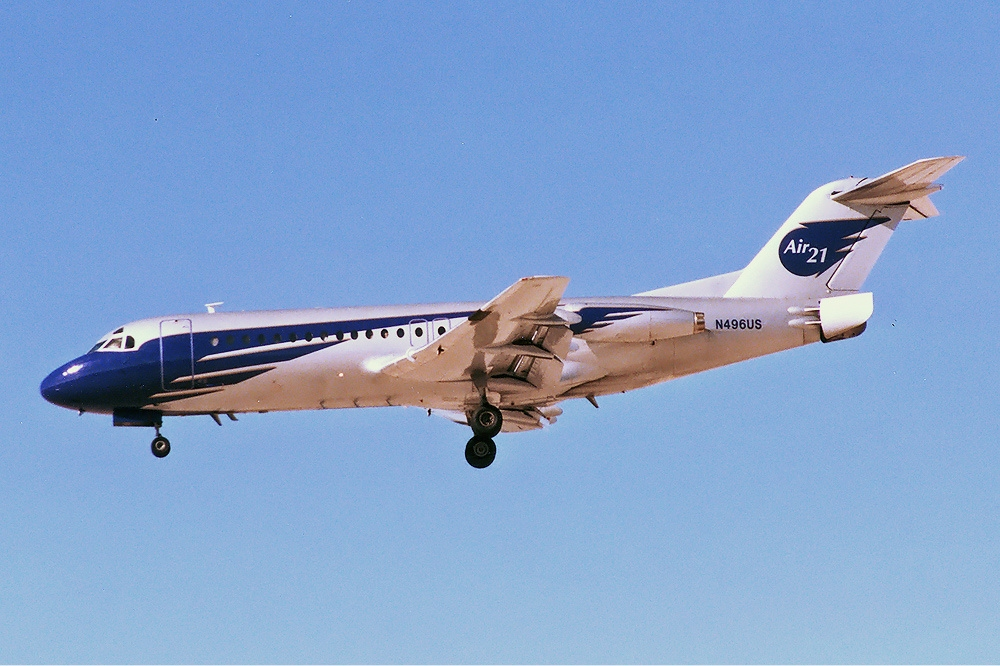
IATA	ICAO	Call sign
A7	UBA	Rocketeer
- Founded: January 1994; 32 years ago
- Ceased operations: January 1997; 29 years ago
- Hubs: Fresno Yosemite International Airport
- Fleet size: 5 Fokker F-28-4000's
- Destinations: Colorado Springs Airport; Grand Junction Regional Airport; McCarran International Airport; Los Angeles International Airport; Palm Springs International Airport; Salt Lake City International Airport; San Francisco International Airport
- Headquarters: Fresno, California
- Key people: Mark Morro David Miller; Joe Levy David J. VanderLugt

Air21 Airlines was a short-lived United States airline based in Fresno, California, led by Mark Morro, founded by David Miller and co-founded by David J. VanderLugt. The airline operated five Fokker F28 Fellowship 64-passenger twin engine jet aircraft.

== History ==
Air21, named through its slogan "Your Low-Cost Carrier and Low-Cost Airline for the Twenty-First Century", was founded by David Miller in January 1994. Miller, a management pilot and executive, partnered with David J. VanderLugt, treasurer of a small startup airline in Visalia, California. In October 1994, Miller and VanderLugt filed necessary paperwork for the certification of operations with the United States Department of Transportation in Washington, D.C. The next year, in March 1995, Miller and VanderLugt along with Mark Morro and Joe Levy, CEO of Gottschalks Department Stores, released their IPO prospectus for the airline. Air21 commenced passenger operations in December 1995.

The crash of ValuJet Airlines Flight 592 in 1996 refocused public attention on the operations of low-cost carriers. With a negative public perception increasing, passenger numbers declined. Air21 ceased operations in January 1997, whereupon it entered Chapter 11 bankruptcy. Two months later in March 1997 a buyout of the company by investment banker David Walsh converted the airline's filing to a Chapter 7 status.

== Destinations ==
According to the Air21 March 1996 system timetable and route map, the airline operated Fokker F28 jet service into the following destinations:

City	Airport
Colorado Springs, CO	Colorado Springs Airport
Fresno, CA	Fresno Yosemite International Airport
Grand Junction, CO	Grand Junction Regional Airport
Las Vegas, NV	McCarran International Airport
Los Angeles, CA	Los Angeles International Airport
Monterey, CA	Monterey Regional Airport
Palm Springs, CA	Palm Springs International Airport
Salt Lake City, UT	Salt Lake City International Airport
San Francisco, CA	San Francisco International Airport

== See also ==
- List of defunct airlines of the United States
