= Imperial Airlines =

1964–1986 American commuter airline

IATA	ICAO	Call sign
II	—	—
- Founded: 1964; 62 years ago
- Ceased operations: 1986; 40 years ago
- Headquarters: El Centro, California, then Carlsbad, California, United States

Imperial Airlines was a United States commuter airline that operated from 1964 to 1986. Imperial served a number of cities in Southern California and for a brief period several cities in Arizona.

== History ==
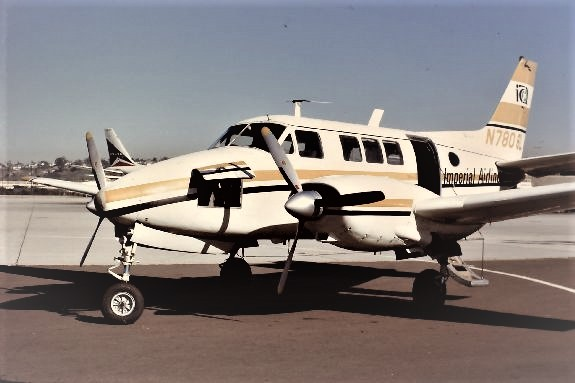
Imperial Airlines Beech Model 65

Imperial was founded as Visco Flying Service in 1964, but later the scheduled passenger service portion of the company changed its name to Imperial Airlines. Visco Flying Service continued to operate as a crop dusting service in the Imperial Valley, for a number of years utilizing Stearman bi-wing biplane aircraft and later added helicopter aerial application as well as a turboprop powered mono-wing crop dusting aircraft. Imperial's passenger carrying operations were operated under FAR135 that initially focused on services from its home base at Imperial County Airport (IPL) in El Centro, CA to San Diego's Lindbergh Field (SAN).

On January 8, 1968, at 10:40 a.m. an Imperial Beech E18S flown by a single pilot with three passengers aboard crashed shortly after take-off from Lindbergh Field when an engine failed and the pilot was unable to control the aircraft. One passenger survived the accident with serious injuries, according to the NTSB report, LAX68A0065.

Imperial acquired a Beechcraft Queen Air 65-B80, carrying passengers between the Imperial Valley and San Diego in daily, frequent service. Up to eleven passengers could be accommodated in modest seating that included the co-pilot seat, as the airline operated with a single-pilot only, at that time permitted by the FARs.

In a brief alliance with Borrego Springs, CA based Sun Aire Lines in the mid-1970s a Swearingen Metroliner "Metro II" turboprop was placed on the route. The arrangement proved problematic and the two lines went their separate ways, with the high-time Queen Air pressed back into service between Imperial and San Diego. By 1976 there were five or six round trips flown Monday through Friday, none on the weekends, the first departing Imperial at 6 a.m. on the 36-minute flight, with service ending each night just before 8 p.m. back in the "Valley."

In mid-1978 discussions resulted in the airline being sold by James K Vedder to a group of investors from the San Diego area who believed that the deregulated airline environment would provide opportunities not before possible. Soon the lone Queen Air was retired, replaced by four twin engine Cessna 402 prop aircraft and a single twin engine Cessna 404. The route system immediately expanded to Yuma and Phoenix as well as Los Angeles International. About 1980 the airline moved its headquarters to McClellan-Palomar Airport in Carlsbad, California. Later the airline acquired the larger Embraer EMB-110 Bandeirante and Short 360 turboprop aircraft for its routes along the southern California coastal corridor in addition to Swearingen Metroliner turboprops and smaller Cessna prop aircraft. For most of the early 1980s, the airline operated flights between San Diego International Airport and Los Angeles International Airport at thirty minutes intervals throughout the day. By 1986 the airline was suffering the effects of increased competition and it ceased operations in January of that year.

Nonstop service between the Imperial - San Diego city pair no longer exists. For several years circa 2015 SeaPort Airlines utilized the single engine turboprop Cessna Caravan 208 configured with nine seats and provided infrequent service. SeaPort left the market after a short period of operation.

== Destinations in 1979 ==
According to the airline's system timetable, Imperial was serving the following destinations in Arizona and California in September 1979:

- Carlsbad (CLD)
- El Centro (IPL) - Imperial's original home base
- Fullerton (FUL)
- Los Angeles (LAX)
- Phoenix (PHX)
- Riverside (RAL)
- San Diego (SAN)
- Tucson (TUS)
- Yuma (YUM)

Imperial flew between LAX and El Centro in 1967/1978 plus I was the travel manager at Mattel and our execs flew to our plant in Mexico via Imperial Airways.

== Destinations in 1984 ==
According to the airline's route map, Imperial was serving the following destinations in California in September 1984:

- Bakersfield (BFL)
- Carlsbad (CLD) - Imperial's home base
- Los Angeles (LAX)
- Ontario (ONT)
- Palm Springs (PSP)
- San Diego (SAN)
- San Luis Obispo (SBP)
- Santa Ana (SNA, now John Wayne Airport)
- Santa Barbara (SBA)

== Fleet ==
Imperial was operating a mix of Swearingen Metroliner and Embraer EMB-110 Bandeirante turboprops as well as smaller Cessna 402 and Cessna 404 prop aircraft during the early 1980s and had earlier operated Beech 18 prop aircraft. By the mid 1980s, the airline had retired the Metroliner and Cessna aircraft and had standardized its fleet with Bandeirante and Short 360 turboprops. The Short 360 was the largest aircraft ever operated by Imperial.

== See also ==
- List of defunct airlines of the United States
