= Air Bahia =

American regional airline

Air Bahia was an American airline company with flights to Mexico, and which also served Las Vegas and Tucson during its existence, from San Diego, California.

== History ==
The short-lived Air Bahia, based in San Diego, operated its first scheduled service on August 18, 1979 (47 years ago). Its operations included service to Los Angeles (LAX), Long Beach (LGB), San Diego via both Lindbergh Field (SAN) and Gillespie Field (SEE), Santa Ana via Orange County Airport (SNA), Palm Springs (PSP), Carlsbad via McClellan-Palomar Airport (CLD), El Centro (IPL), Calexico (CXL) and various points in Baja California and elsewhere in Mexico. In July 1980, Air Bahia was operating high frequency shuttle service between San Diego Lindbergh Field and Los Angeles (LAX) with twelve round trip flights every weekday and also between San Diego Lindbergh Field and Tijuana, Mexico with thirteen round trip flights every weekday. Its flights arrived and departed from the eastern terminal building at Lindbergh Field which it shared with National Airlines (1934-1980), Pacific Southwest Airlines (PSA) and United Airlines at the time.

The airline operated only a small handful of twin prop commuter aircraft, including the Piper Chieftain, Piper Navajo and the Britten-Norman BN-2 Islander.

Air Bahia operated scheduled international passenger service from Lindbergh Field, McClellan-Palomar Airport and Gillespie Field in San Diego County to several Mexican destinations and also flew nonstop between Tucson (TUS) and Guaymas, Mexico. Its timetables advertised connecting services to and from jet flights operated by Aeromexico and Mexicana de Aviacion in Mexico. Other routes included nonstop service between Las Vegas (LAS) and both Carlsbad and Long Beach. The airline's fleet service center was located at Southern Cal Aircraft Repair at Gillespie Field.

In December 1980 (45 years ago), Air Bahia filed for bankruptcy and all flights ceased. Reorganization under Chapter 11 failed, and the company folded up in 1981 without resuming flights.

== Destinations: 1979-1980 ==
According to Air Bahia route maps from 1979 and 1980, the airline served the following destinations:

Arizona

- Tucson (TUS)

California

- Calexico (CXL)
- Carlsbad via McClellan Palomar Airport (CLD)
- El Centro via the Imperial County Airport (IPL)
- Long Beach (LGB)
- Los Angeles (LAX)
- Palm Springs (PSP)
- San Diego via both Lindbergh Field (SAN) and Gillespie Field (SEE)
- Santa Ana via Orange County Airport (SNA, now John Wayne Airport)

Nevada

- Las Vegas (LAS)

Mexico

- Ensenada (ESE)
- Guaymas (GYM)
- San Felipe (SFH)
- Tijuana (TIJ)

== See also ==
- List of defunct airlines of the United States
