= Imperial County Airport =

Municipal airport in Imperial, California, United States

Imperial County Airport Boley Field
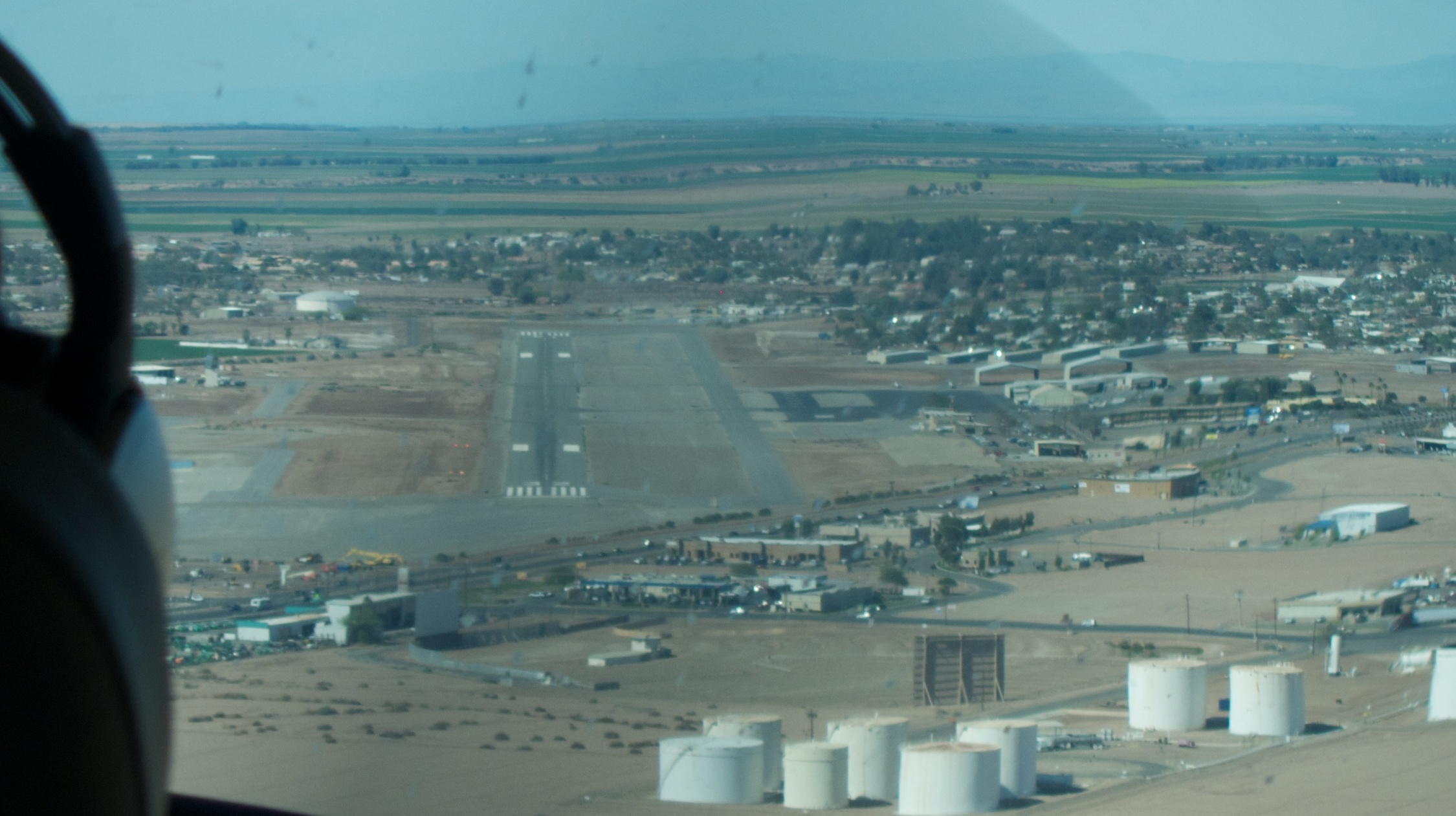
- Airport on approach

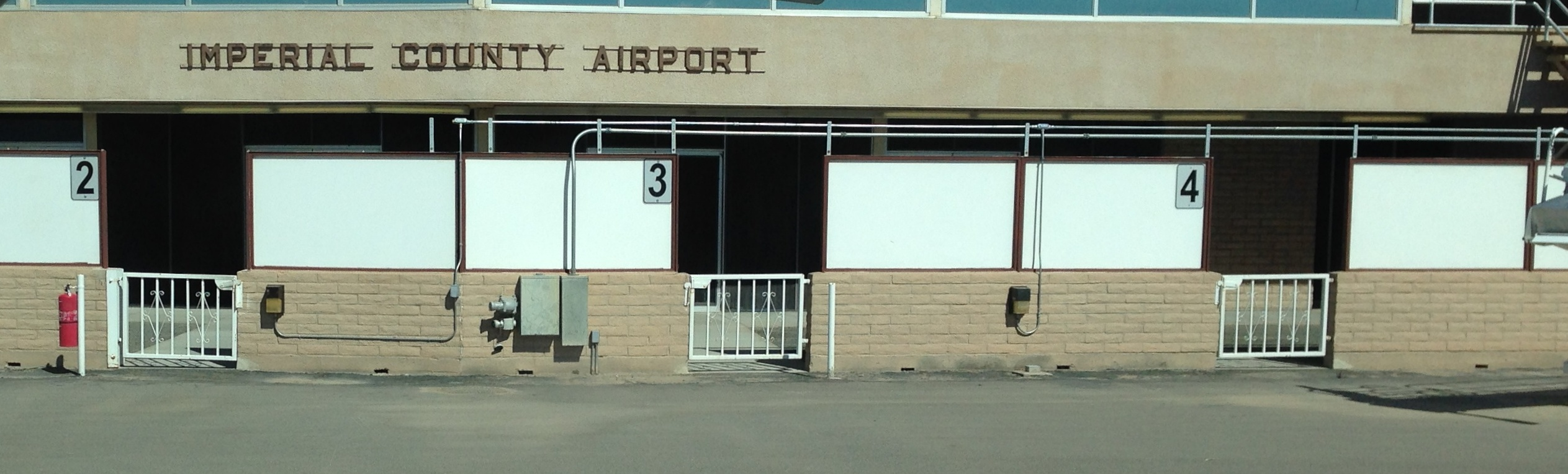
- IATA: IPL; ICAO: KIPL; FAA LID: IPL

Summary
- Airport type: Public
- Owner: Imperial County
- Serves: Imperial / El Centro
- Location: Imperial County, California
- Elevation AMSL: −54 ft (−16 m)
- Coordinates: 32°50′03″N 115°34′43″W
- Website: airport.imperialcounty.org

Map
- Location of airport in California IPL (the United States)

Runways
Direction	Length		Surface
Direction	ft	m	Surface
14/32	5,308	1,618	Asphalt
8/26	4,501	1,372	Asphalt

Statistics (2024)
- Total passengers: 7,373
- Based aircraft (2022): 32
- Source: Federal Aviation Administration

Imperial County Airport (IATA: IPL, ICAO: KIPL, FAA LID: IPL) is a county-owned public-use airport in Imperial County, California, United States. Also known as Boley Field, it is mostly used for general aviation, but has scheduled passenger service from one commercial airline. Service is subsidized by the Essential Air Service program. The airport is located 1 nautical mile (1.9 km; 1.2 mi) south of the central business district of Imperial, California, partially in the city of Imperial and partially in an unincorporated area of Imperial County. It serves nearby communities, including El Centro.

The National Plan of Integrated Airport Systems for 2021–2025 categorized it as a non-primary commercial service airport.

The first scheduled passenger airline flights began in 1943, operated by Western Airlines with Douglas DC-3s. Western's service was replaced by Bonanza Air Lines in 1953 also flying DC-3s. Bonanza was merged into Air West (later Hughes Airwest) in 1968 and was the primary air carrier serving El Centro and the Imperial Valley until 1979.

== Historical airline service ==
Western Airlines began serving Imperial County Airport in 1943 with Douglas DC-3 flights to Los Angeles via stops in San Diego and Long Beach, and was also flying nonstop to Yuma. Western's service ended in 1953.

Bonanza Air Lines, a "local service" air carrier as defined by the federal Civil Aeronautics Board (CAB), began serving the airport in 1953, taking over the route of Western Airlines. According to its March 1, 1953 system timetable, Bonanza listed its flights to the airport as service to El Centro and was operating Douglas DC-3 prop aircraft with a daily westbound routing of Phoenix-Blythe-Yuma-El Centro-San Diego-Santa Ana-Los Angeles. Bonanza was also operating a daily eastbound DC-3 service at this time with routing of Los Angeles-Santa Ana-San Diego-El Centro-Yuma-Blythe-Phoenix-Prescott-Kingman-Las Vegas. By 1963, Bonanza had retired the DC-3 from its fleet and was operating all flights into the airport with new Fairchild F-27 turboprops. In 1964, the airline was operating nonstop F-27 propjet flights to Los Angeles and San Diego with one stop service to Phoenix via an intermediate stop in Yuma.

In 1968, Bonanza merged with Pacific Air Lines and West Coast Airlines to form Air West which continued to serve the airport with the F-27 with nonstops to San Diego and Santa Ana (now John Wayne Airport) as well as direct flights to Los Angeles, Phoenix and Tucson. In late 1970, Air West was serving the airport with Douglas DC-9-10 and McDonnell Douglas DC-9-30 jetliners with four flights a day including two nonstops to Los Angeles (LAX) and two direct flights to Phoenix (PHX) via an intermediate stop in Yuma (YUM). At this same time, one of the DC-9 jet flights to LAX operated continuing, no change of plane service to Fresno, San Francisco, Portland, OR and Seattle via intermediate stops at other Air West destinations. Air West was renamed Hughes Airwest in 1970 following its acquisition by Howard Hughes. The DC-9 jet service was suspended in 1972 but reinstated during 1974 through 1975. By 1976 Hughes Airwest reverted to operating all F-27 propjet service from the airport to Los Angeles and Santa Ana with direct service to Phoenix via a stop in Yuma. All Hughes Airwest service to El Centro ended in 1979 and was replaced by commuter carriers Cochise and Sun Aire Lines.

The following is a list of commuter and regional airlines as well as their respective aircraft types that served Imperial County Airport (IPL) from 1969 through 1999 primarily with nonstop flights to Los Angeles (LAX) and one stop to Phoenix (PHX) by way of Yuma (YUM). All service to Phoenix was discontinued in 1989. Imperial Airlines and Air Bahia flew nonstop to San Diego (SAN), and Scenic Airlines flew nonstop to both Las Vegas (LAS) and Long Beach (LGB). This information was retrieved from various editions of the Official Airline Guide (OAG) over the years:

- Imperial Airlines, 1969-1981 - Beech 18, Beechcraft Queen Air, Cessna 402, Cessna 404, Fairchild Swearingen Metroliner
- Scenic Airlines, 1978 - Fairchild Swearingen Metroliner
- Air Bahia, 1980 - Piper Navajo, Piper Chieftain
- Cochise Airlines, 1979-1982 - Convair 440, Fairchild Swearingen Metroliner
- Sun Aire Lines, 1979-1986 - Fairchild Swearingen Metroliner. Merged into SkyWest Airlines in 1985.
- Western Express operated by SkyWest Airlines on behalf of Western Airlines, 1986-1987 - Fairchild Swearingen Metroliner, Embraer EMB-120 Brasilia (SkyWest then began operating Delta Connection service from the airport following the merger of Western and Delta Air Lines in 1987)
- Delta Connection operated by SkyWest Airlines on behalf of Delta Air Lines, 1987-1997 - Fairchild Swearingen Metroliner, Embraer EMB-120 Brasilia
- Skynet Airways, 1993-1995 - Cessna aircraft, service to Long Beach.
- United Express operated by WestAir on behalf of United Airlines, 1994-1997 - British Aerospace BAe Jetstream 31
- United Express operated by SkyWest Airlines on behalf of United Airlines, 1997-2013 - Embraer EMB-120 Brasilia
- SeaPort Airlines, 2013–2016, - Cessna 208 Caravan. Service to Burbank and San Diego.
- Mokulele Airlines, 2016-current, - Cessna 208 Caravan. Mokulele was merged into Southern Airways Express in 2020.

By 1997, only one airline was serving the airport: SkyWest operating as United Express flying Embraer EMB-120 Brasilia turboprops with nonstop service to LAX as part of a Los Angeles-El Centro/Imperial-Yuma route. United Express continued providing the only service to the airport until 2013. Smaller commuter airlines using single-engine, non-pressurized aircraft now serve El Centro.

== Facilities and aircraft ==
Imperial County Airport covers an area of 370 acres (150 ha) at an elevation of 54 feet (16 m) below mean sea level. It has two asphalt paved runways: 14/32 is 5,308 by 100 feet (1,618 x 30 m) and 8/26 is 4,501 by 75 feet (1,372 x 23 m).

For the 12 month period ending December 31, 2019, the airport had 14,368 aircraft operations, an average of 39 per day: 66% general aviation, 8% scheduled commercial / air taxi and 26% military. In April 2022, there were 32 aircraft based at this airport: 30 single-engine, 1 multi-engine and 1 helicopter.

== Airlines and destinations ==
=== Passenger ===
Airlines	Destinations	Refs
Advanced Air	Los Angeles/Hawthorne, Phoenix–Sky Harbor, San Diego/Carlsbad	

SeaPort Airlines previously operated Cessna 208 Caravan single turboprop engine aircraft on all scheduled flights from the airport. On January 19, 2016, Seaport Airlines announced the cessation of all service within California, citing their inability to find pilots as the reason.

=== Cargo ===
Airlines	Destinations
Ameriflight	Ontario
FedEx Feeder operated by West Air	San Diego

== Statistics ==
Carrier shares: July 2025 – June 2026
Carrier	Passengers (arriving and departing)
Southern Airways Express	6,570(100%)

Top domestic destinations: July 2025 – June 2026
Rank	City	Passengers
1	Los Angeles, CA	2,510
2	Phoenix, AZ	790

== Other sources ==
- Essential Air Service documents (Docket DOT-OST-2008-0299) from the U.S. Department of Transportation:
  - Order 2008-12-26 (December 29, 2008): selecting SkyWest Airlines, Inc., d/b/a United Express, to provide essential air service at El Centro/Imperial, California, at an annual subsidy rate of $662,551 through December 31, 2010. SkyWest to provide 13 nonstop round trips per week to Los Angeles with 30-seat Embraer Brasilia aircraft,
  - Order 2009-5-21 (May 27, 2009): Approving Alternate Service Pattern
  - Order 2010-12-6 (December 3, 2010): selecting SkyWest Airlines, Inc., d/b/a United Express, to provide essential air service at El Centro, California, at an annual subsidy rate of $1,852,091 through December 31, 2012. SkyWest to provide 13 nonstop round trips per week to Los Angeles (LAX) with 30-seat Embraer Brasilia turboprops for $1,852,091 annual subsidy.
  - Order 2013-01-02 (January 2, 2013): selecting SeaPort Airlines, Inc. (SeaPort), to provide Essential Air Service (EAS) at El Centro, California, for $1,943,7511 annually for 29 nonstop round trips per week to San Diego (SAN) on Cessna 208 Caravan aircraft, 9-seat, single engine turboprop.
  - Order 2014-4-26 (April 24, 2014): directing interested persons to show cause as to why the Department should not terminate the eligibility ... under the Essential Air Service (EAS) program based on criteria passed by Congress in the FAA Modernization and Reform Act of 2012 (Public Law No. 112-95). We find that El Centro is within 175 miles of a large or medium hub, San Diego International Airport (SAN), a large hub, and, thus, is subject to the 10-enplanement statutory criterion. We also find that during fiscal year 2013, El Centro generated a total of 5,950 passengers (inbound plus outbound). Consistent with the methodology described above, that results in an average of 9.5 enplanements per day, below the 10-enplanement statutory criterion necessary to remain eligible in the EAS program.
