= Sun Aire Lines =

United States commuter airline

IATA	ICAO	Call sign
OO	—	—
- Founded: 1968; 57 years ago
- Ceased operations: September 25, 1985; 39 years ago
- Operating bases: Palm Springs

Sun Aire Lines was a United States commuter airline that operated from 1968 to 1985. Sun Aire served a number of cities in Southern California and Arizona.

== History ==
Sun Aire Lines was founded as Borrego Springs Airlines in 1968. Its operations initially focused on providing air service into Borrego Springs, California via the Borrego Valley Airport from other destinations in southern California such as San Diego and Palm Springs. The airline later moved its headquarters to Palm Springs, California. Borrego Springs Airlines operated a small fleet of Cessna 402 prop aircraft and Swearingen Metro II turboprops before changing its name to Sun Aire in 1975. Its primary destinations were Palm Springs, San Diego, Los Angeles, Borrego Springs, Phoenix, Yuma, Santa Barbara and Santa Maria. By 1984, the airline was operating a dozen Metro II propjet aircraft and was purchased by SkyWest Airlines. The airline operated its final service on September 28, 1985, at which time it was merged into SkyWest.

== Destinations ==
According to the route map in the Sun Aire system timetable dated January 23, 1984, the airline was serving the following destinations in Arizona and California:

- Bakersfield, CA (BFL)
- Borrego Springs, CA (BXS)
- Burbank, CA (BUR, now Bob Hope Airport)
- El Centro/Imperial, CA (IPL)
- Los Angeles, CA (LAX)
- Ontario, CA (ONT)
- Palm Springs, CA (PSP)
- Phoenix, AZ (PHX)
- San Diego, CA (SAN)
- Santa Barbara, CA (SBA)
- Santa Maria, CA (SMX)
- Yuma, AZ (YUM)

== Fleet ==
At the time of its acquisition by SkyWest Airlines, Sun Aire was operating 19-passenger Fairchild Swearingen Metroliner "Metro II" commuter turboprop aircraft. Predecessor Borrego Springs Airlines had also previously operated smaller Cessna 402 twin prop aircraft.

== See also ==
- List of defunct airlines of the United States
