= SNW =

SNW may refer to:

- Star Trek: Strange New Worlds, TV series
- Super Nintendo World, a theme park
- Storage Networking World, a conference for data storage professionals
- SNW1, a protein
- Strategic nuclear weapon, a nuclear weapon used on strategic targets
- snw, ISO 639-3 code for the Santrokofi language
- SNW, ICAO code for Sun West Airlines
- SNW, IATA airport code for Thandwe Airport, Myanmar
- S. N. W. Hulugalle, Ceylonese colonial-era legislator and headmen
