= Durango–La Plata County Airport =

Airport in Durango, Colorado, USA

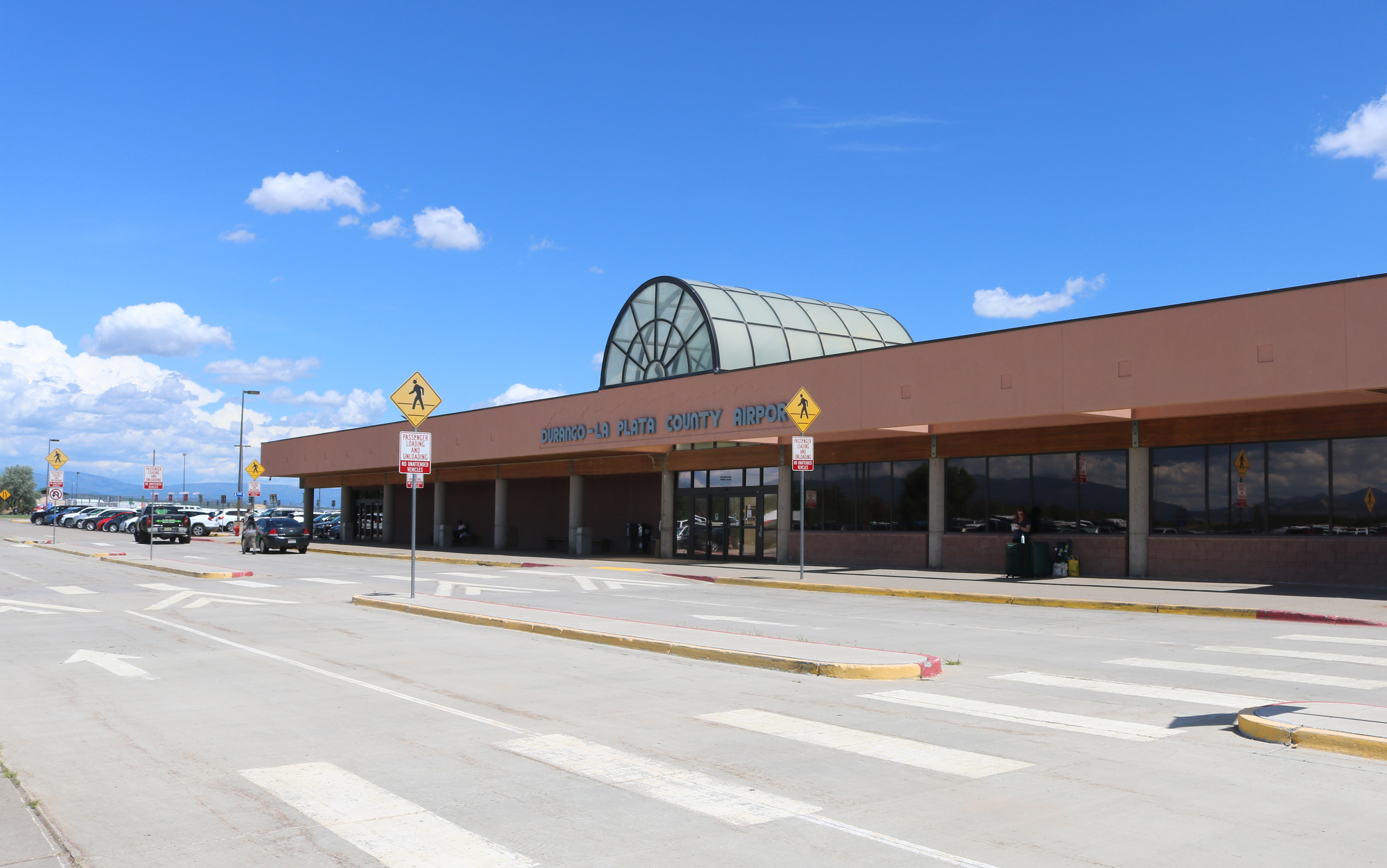
- The terminal building
- IATA: DRO; ICAO: KDRO; FAA LID: DRO

Summary
- Airport type: Public
- Operator: City of Durango & La Plata County
- Serves: Durango, Colorado
- Elevation AMSL: 6,685 ft (2,038 m)
- Coordinates: 37°09′05″N 107°45′14″W
- Website: www.flydurango.com

Map
- Location of airport in Colorado DRO (the United States)

Runways
Direction	Length		Surface
Direction	ft	m	Surface
3/21	9,201	2,804	Asphalt

Statistics
- Passenger volume (12 months ending March 2020): 387,000
- Scheduled flights: 4,887
- Aircraft operations (2019): 38,468
- Based aircraft (2020): 69
- Source: Federal Aviation Administration, BTS

Durango–La Plata County Airport (IATA: DRO, ICAO: KDRO, FAA LID: DRO) – also known as Durango Airport and La Plata County Airport – is a city- and county-owned public airport located approximately 12 miles (19 km) southeast of Durango, in La Plata County, Colorado, United States.

It is included in the Federal Aviation Administration (FAA) National Plan of Integrated Airport Systems for 2019–2023, in which it is categorized as a non-hub primary commercial service facility. Federal Aviation Administration records say it had 134,386 passenger boardings (enplanements) in calendar year 2008, 148,077 in 2009 and 163,611 in 2010.

== History ==
La Plata County Airport opened to commercial airline service in 1946. The first scheduled airline service to the La Plata County Airport began on November 27, 1946, when Monarch Air Lines initiated flights to Denver with stops at Monte Vista, Canon City, Pueblo, and Colorado Springs, Colorado, using Douglas DC-3 aircraft. By April 1, 1947, new routes were added to Albuquerque and Salt Lake City, each making several stops en route. Durango would be the connecting hub for the three routes.

During the summer of 1977, the airport was closed so the terminal building could be expanded and the runway was lengthened to handle jet traffic. Frontier Airlines then began operating Boeing 737 jets to the airport in the fall of 1977. The terminal was greatly expanded again in the 1990s as the airport began seeing a great increase in ski traffic and new service by American Airlines using McDonnell Douglas MD-80 jets. During the 2000s the airport continued to court additional service by new airlines while luring passenger traffic away from the Four Corners Regional Airport serving nearby Farmington, New Mexico.

During the early 2020s, work began on a $28 million terminal expansion project. The project includes, among other things, the construction of two new passenger gates and an expanded passenger hold room, updated security checkpoints, and improved baggage claim facilities. Phase 1A of the project was completed in spring 2024, and work on Phase 1B is expected to be completed by 2026.

== Facilities and aircraft ==
The airport covers 1,281 acres (518 ha) at an elevation of 6,685 feet (2,038 m). Its one runway, 3/21, is 9,201 by 150 feet (2,804 x 46 m) asphalt.

For the twelve-month period ending January 1, 2020, the airport had 38,468 aircraft operations, average 105 per day: 70% general aviation, 15% airline, 13% air taxi, and 1% military. In June 2020, there were 69 aircraft based at this airport: 52 single-engine, 9 multi-engine, 5 jet, 1 helicopter, and 2 glider.

== Airlines and destinations ==
=== Passenger ===
Airlines	Destinations
American Airlines	Dallas/Fort Worth
American Eagle	Dallas/Fort Worth, Phoenix–Sky Harbor
United Airlines	Denver
United Express	Denver; Seasonal: Houston–Intercontinental

The airport has three boarding gates, five plane stands, a pre-security restaurant, and a gift shop. It has free wi-fi internet throughout the passenger terminal.

=== Cargo ===
Airlines	Destinations
FedEx Feeder	Albuquerque

=== Historical airline service ===
The La Plata County Airport's first commercial flight commenced on November 27, 1946, when Monarch Air Lines began flights using Douglas DC-3 aircraft. New routes were added to Albuquerque and Salt Lake City the following year, each making several stops en route. Durango would be the connecting hub for the three routes.

On June 1, 1950, Monarch was merged into Frontier Airlines (1950-1986) and a new route to Phoenix was added making five stops. The flights to Albuquerque and Salt Lake City had ended in the early 1950s as they were redirected through Farmington, New Mexico which then became Frontier's connecting hub for the four corners states. In 1959 Frontier acquired 44-passenger Convair 340 aircraft and new nonstop flights were added from Durango to Denver as well as new flights to Phoenix and Tucson that only stopped in Farmington. By 1966 the Convair 340s had been upgraded to Convair 580 turboprop aircraft and all of the original Douglas DC-3 aircraft had been retired. Direct flights to Albuquerque were reinstated in 1969. During the summer of 1977, the La Plata County Airport was closed so that the main runway could be extended to handle jet traffic. Frontier Airlines then initiated the first jets to the airport in November 1977 with Boeing 737 flights to Denver making one stop in Pueblo, Colorado. Weekend flights were also added to Dallas/Fort Worth for the 1977–78 ski season. The flights to Phoenix, still operating with Convair 580s, were discontinued in 1979 and flights to Albuquerque ended in 1981. On June 1, 1982, Frontier had retired its Convair 580 aircraft fleet and was operating all 737 jets at Durango, now with nonstop flights to Denver and return flights stopping in Farmington. More weekend ski season jet flights were added to Dallas/Fort Worth, Houston, Atlanta, and Los Angeles for the 1982–83, 1983–84, and 1984–85 winter ski seasons. The 737 jets to Denver ended on October 1, 1984, and were replaced with Convair 580s operated by Frontier Commuter. Frontier Commuter ended all service in January 1985 and after Frontier's ski season flights ended by April 1, 1985, all Frontier representation at Durango was discontinued.

Since the beginning of airline deregulation in 1978, many carriers, small and large, have served Durango:

Aspen Airways flew to Denver from late 1978 through 1990 using Convair 580s and in 1985 introduced British Aerospace BAe 146-100 jets. In 1986 Aspen became a United Express feeder carrier for United Airlines at the carriers' Denver hub. Aspen also flew to Albuquerque briefly in 1979 and again for the winter 1989–90 ski season.

Rocky Mountain Airways briefly flew to Denver in January 1979 using de Havilland Canada DHC-7 Dash 7s. The carrier returned from 1987 through 1991 operating as Continental Express again using Dash-7s as well as ATR 42s, and Beechcraft 1900Cs.

Zia Airlines flew commuter flights to Albuquerque in early 1980 using Handley Page Jetstreams.

Desert Pacific Airlines flew to Los Angeles in 1980 making five stops en route and using Piper Navajos.

Sun West Airlines flew to Albuquerque and Phoenix from 1980 through 1984 using Piper Navajos and later upgrading to Beechcraft C99s.

Mesa Airlines operated multiple services at Durango. Flights to Albuquerque began in 1983 with Beechcraft C99s, later upgrading to Beechcraft 1900Ds and the Albuquerque flights were operated on and off through 2005. Service to Denver began in 1990 as United Express and continued into 1998 using Beechcraft 1300s and 1900s and later upgraded with Embraer EMB-120 Brasilias and de Havilland Canada DHC-8 Dash 8s. Service to Phoenix began in 1987 and was changed to America West Express in 1992. Beechcraft 1900s, Embraer Brasilia's and Dash-8's were all used. Canadair CRJ-200 regional jets were introduced in 1999. America West Airlines merged into US Airways in 2007 at which time the Phoenix flights began operating as US Airways Express. Then in 2015 US Airways merged into American Airlines which changed the Phoenix flights to American Eagle. All flights were upgraded with Canadair CRJ-900 aircraft a short time later and continue operating today.

Pioneer Airlines flew to Albuquerque and Denver in 1982 and 1983 using Fairchild Swearingen Metroliners.

Trans-Colorado Airlines began Durango service in mid 1983 with service to Denver and later added flights to Albuquerque and Colorado Springs using Fairchild Swearingen Metroliners. The carrier became a Continental Express feeder in 1986 and continued the Denver flights through 1988 adding the Convair 580 aircraft as well.

America West Airlines operated mainline Boeing 737 jet service to Phoenix from 1984 through 1991. Some flights would stop at Albuquerque or Grand Junction. The 737 jets were replaced with Dash-8 props from 1991 through 1992 then service was contracted out to Mesa Airlines as America West Express.

Britt Airways followed Rocky Mountain Airways by operating Denver flights as Continental Express from 1991 through 1994 using Beechcraft 1900s and ATR 42s.

GP Express then followed Britt Airways by operating Continental Connection service to Denver from 1994 through 1995 using Beechcraft 1900s.

American Airlines began ski season service during the winter of 1994–95 with flights to Dallas/Fort Worth using McDonnell Douglas MD-80 mainline jets. The service continued for seven winter ski seasons, ending with the 2000–01 season.

Reno Air operated one daily flight to Albuquerque which continued on to Los Angeles for the 1996–97 ski season. A McDonnell Douglas MD-80 jet was used.

Air 21 flew a single daily flight to Grand Junction, Las Vegas, Los Angeles, and Fresno for a short time in late 1996 using a Fokker F28 Fellowship jet.

Mountain Air Express operating on behalf of Western Pacific Airlines served Durango from Colorado Springs during the 1996/1997 ski season. The carrier used Dornier 328 prop aircraft.

Rio Grande Air flew commuter flights to Albuquerque from 2000 through 2002 using Cessna 208 Caravan aircraft.

United Express service to Denver was transferred in 1998 from Mesa Airlines to Air Wisconsin, and Great Lakes Airlines. Air Wisconsin flew Dornier 328prop and British Aerospace BAe-146 jets through 2003. Great Lakes flew Beechcraft 1900Ds through 2001. Mesa Airlines returned with Dash-8 flights to Denver from 2003 through 2010. SkyWest Airlines began United Express flights in 2001 with Embraer Brasilia's and service continues today, now with all regional jets. ExpressJet flew Embraer-145's from 2010 through 2015. Republic Airways began flights in 2012 with Dash-8-Q400's and later upgraded with Embraer 170's and 175's. GoJet began in 2014 with CRJ-700's and Trans States Airlines in 2015 with Embraer-145's, all to Denver. New Saturday only flights were added in the summer of 2019 to Chicago and Houston by SkyWest Airlines.

American Eagle began serving Durango from Dallas/Fort Worth from December 2001 through September 2002. The service returned in mid 2011 and has operated year-round since. Embraer EMB-135 and Embraer EMB-145 regional jets were first used. American Eagle service to Phoenix was added in late 2015 operated by both Mesa Airlines and SkyWest after American and US Airways merged. American Eagle service to Dallas/Fort Worth and Phoenix is now solely provided by Mesa Airlines using Canadair CRJ-900 regional jets. Seasonal Saturday only flights during the summer are now flown to Chicago and Los Angeles by SkyWest Airlines.

Continental Express service operated by ExpressJet flew to Houston from December 2001 through September 2002 then again for the winter 2002–03 ski season using Embraer EMB-145 regional jets.

Delta Connection service operated by SkyWest Airlines flew to Salt Lake City from mid-2006 through late 2008 using Canadair CRJ-200 regional jets. This daily service resumed on May 5, 2021, before ending on November 1, 2021, leaving only American, United, and Frontier Airlines flying to Durango–La Plata County Airport.

The new Frontier Airlines provided service to Denver at first by way of its subsidiary company, Lynx Aviation, using de Havilland Canada DHC-8-402 Q400 prop aircraft from April 22, 2008, through 2011. Service was upgraded in 2012 to Embraer EMB-190 regional jets operated by Republic Airways then upgraded again from 2013 through 2014 using Frontier Airlines mainline Airbus A319s. All service ended on October 25, 2014. In June 2021, Frontier returned to Durango with nonstop service to Denver and Las Vegas.

American Eagle, flying for American Airlines, has year round nonstops to Dallas/Fort Worth and Phoenix on Canadair CRJ-900s.United Express flights nonstop to Denver are flown on Canadair CRJ-200, Canadair CRJ-700, Embraer ERJ-145, and Embraer 175 aircraft. On March 26, 2023 United Airlines began non-stop mainline flights to Denver using an Airbus A319

United Express began seasonal service to Houston–Intercontinental on June 24, 2023 utilizing an Embraer 175 aircraft.

== Statistics ==
=== Top destinations ===
Busiest domestic routes from DRO (February 2025 – January 2026)
Rank	City	Passengers	Carriers
1	Denver, Colorado	157,590	United
2	Dallas, Texas	72,710	American
3	Phoenix, Arizona	50,510	American
4	Houston, Texas	3,740	United

=== Carrier shares ===
Airline Market Shares (February 2025 – January 2026)
Rank	Airline	Passengers	Market Share
1	SkyWest	340,000	59.90%
2	United	190,000	33.48%
3	American	29,630	5.22%
4	Mesa	7,950	1.49%

== Accidents and incidents ==
- On December 31, 1981, Sun West Airlines Flight 104, a Piper Navajo Chieftain from Albuquerque, crashed while executing a missed approach in marginal weather to Durango–La Plata County Airport. The pilot and three of the five passengers on board were killed.
- On January 19, 1988, Trans-Colorado Airlines Flight 2286, operating as a Continental Express feeder flight from Denver to Cortez, Colorado with a stop in Durango, crashed while on approach to Durango-La Plata Airport. Nine of the 17 passengers and crew on board were killed in the accident.
- On February 2, 1988, Aspen Airways, operating as United Express flight 3749 from Denver, a Convair 580 aircraft, drifted off a snow-packed runway at night while landing at Durango and crashed into a snowbank. All 38 passengers and crew of three survived.

== See also ==
- List of airports in Colorado
