= Flight 311 =

Flight 311 may refer to:

- Aero Flight 311, plane crash in 1961
- Thai Airways International Flight 311, plane crash in 1992
