= HD Mountains =

Mountain range in Colorado, United States

Coordinates: 37.197°N 107.439°W

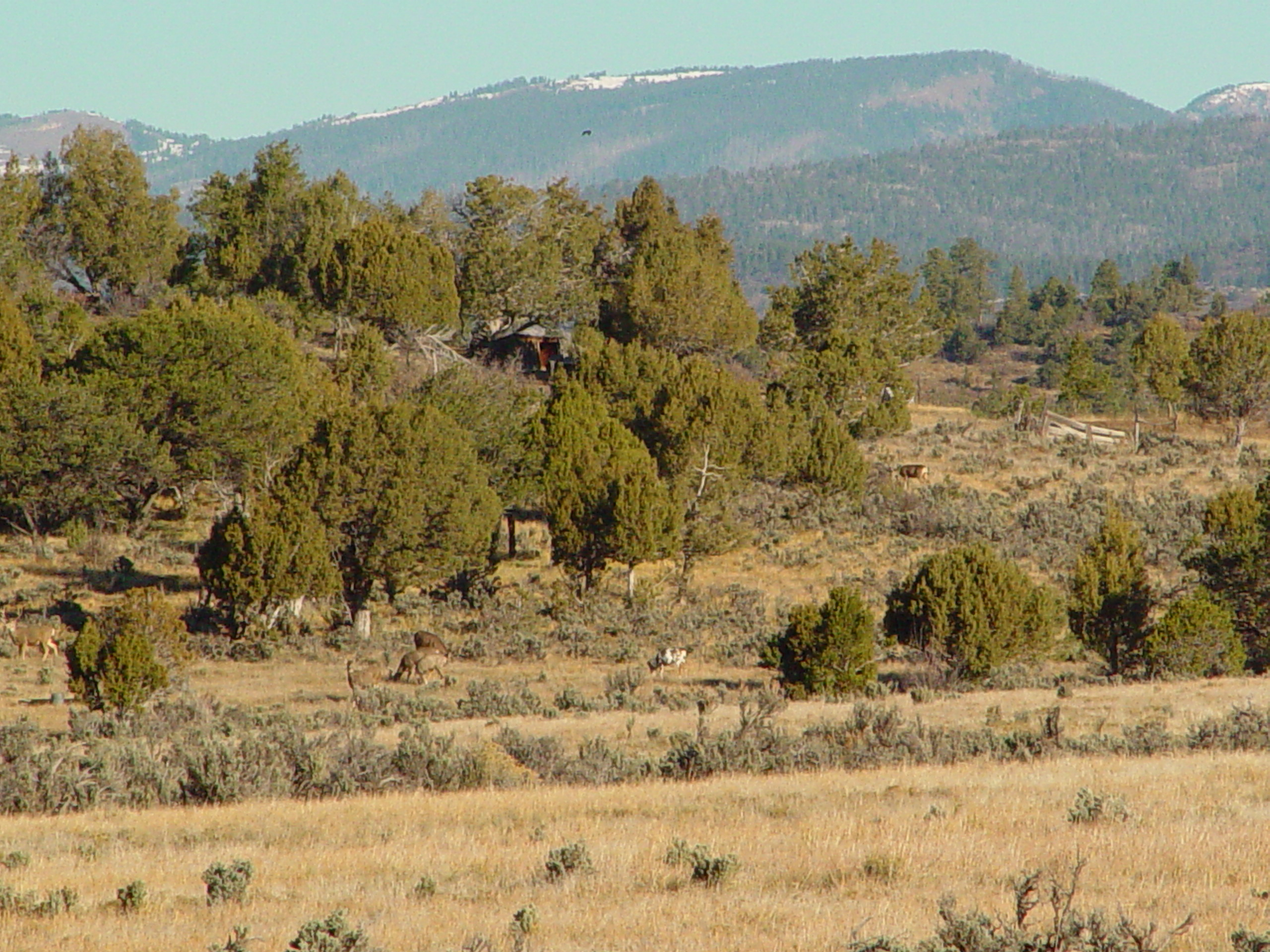
HD mountains looking southeast near Bayfield, Colorado

The HD Mountains are located in southwest Colorado. They are part of the San Juan Mountain range, which are part of the Rocky Mountains.
