= Trans-Colorado Airlines =

US airline, 1980–1988

IATA	ICAO	Call sign
-	TCE	TRANS COLORADO
- Founded: August 25, 1980; 46 years ago
- Commenced operations: December 23, 1980; 45 years ago
- Ceased operations: July 1988; 38 years ago
- Hubs: Stapleton International Airport
- Destinations: 9 (as of August 1, 1985)
- Headquarters: Colorado Springs, Colorado, U.S.

Trans-Colorado Airlines was a United States airline based in Colorado Springs, Colorado. It operated from August 1980 until July 1988. The airline operated flights for Continental Airlines under the Continental Express banner beginning in 1986.

== Early history ==
Trans-Colorado Airlines was incorporated on August 25, 1980, as Commuter Airlines of Colorado. Operations began on December 23, 1980, with one Swearingen Metro II. It served and was based in Gunnison, CO, with scheduled flights to and from Stapleton International Airport in Denver. The name was changed to Trans-Colorado Airlines Inc. by the summer of 1981.

The company inaugurated service to Montrose, CO in May 1981 and acquired a second aircraft, a Metro III, in November 1981. On February 1, 1982, the airline acquired its second Metro III and, one month later, inaugurated service to Cortez, CO.

The company acquired its third Metro III on Monday, May 2, 1983, and service began from Denver to Durango, CO on June 15, 1983. On December 16, 1983, service was extended to Albuquerque, NM with an Albuquerque-Durango-Gunnison route.

On April 15, 1984, Trans-Colorado began service to Colorado Springs, with an Albuquerque-Colorado Springs-Denver route. Its corporate headquarters and all maintenance activities were moved to Colorado Springs later that year.

At the end of 1984, the company operated one Metro II and four Metro III aircraft. One year later, the company operated one Metro II and five Metro III airplanes.

Service to Riverton, WY and Rock Springs, WY from Denver began in 1985, and Trans-Colorado planned to inaugurate new service to Telluride, CO from Albuquerque for the 1985/1986 winter ski season. However, flights were operated through Cortez, CO instead. Service from Denver to Cheyenne, WY was added on April 7, 1986.

On February 3, 1986, Trans-Colorado began service to Farmington, NM and Roswell, NM with routes from Denver to Farmington and from Albuquerque to Farmington and Roswell. All service at Albuquerque and Roswell ended on July 15, 1986, when the company initiated Continental Express service at Denver.

== Continental Express carrier ==
On July 15, 1986, Trans-Colorado became a Continental Express carrier, serving Continental Airlines flights at Denver. Under the terms of the agreement, Trans-Colorado flights were listed under the CO designation in airlines' computer reservation systems. In addition, Continental provided Trans-Colorado with ticketing, baggage handling, and passenger boarding at Denver and Colorado Springs and with all passenger reservations through its own reservation system. Trans-Colorado was responsible for all aspects of the operations and all maintenance on the airplanes. New service began from Denver to Casper, WY, Gillette, WY, and Jackson Hole, WY, as well as to Rapid City, SD and Pierre, SD. Two 50-Passenger Convair 580 aircraft were leased from Sierra Pacific Airlines and painted in full Continental Express colors.

Trans-Colorado revised its schedule to provide feed to Continental at Denver and Colorado Springs.

On January 1, 1987, Trans-Colorado returned to Albuquerque as Continental Express and reinstated its flights to Colorado Springs and Durango. On April 1, 1987, service was reinstated from Albuquerque to Farmington and Roswell and new service was added to Alamogordo, NM, Carlsbad, NM, El Paso, TX, and Tucson, AZ, all as Continental Express. An Albuquerque-Roswell-Carlsbad-El Paso route was started, which was a route that Continental Airlines first operated in 1940. Alamogordo, NM was served from El Paso, and one Convair 580 aircraft was used to provide service from Albuquerque to Tucson. The Convair 580 was also used on two Albuquerque-Farmington flights as well. All Continental Express routes from Denver were transferred to Rocky Mountain Airways on June 5, 1987, leaving only the Albuquerque flights operating as Continental Express. The Alamogordo, El Paso, and Tucson flights were very short lived and discontinued on June 15, 1987, along with the Convair 580. The remaining Albuquerque flights were then discontinued on July 31, 1987.

Trans-Colorado records indicate that its load factor increased as a result of the arrangement, from 36.6% during the first 6 months of 1986, to 55.6% in August of the same year.

== Agreement with Rocky Mountain Airways ==
Continental Airlines later purchased Rocky Mountain Airways, a regional operator considerably larger than Trans-Colorado, and was also based at Denver Stapleton. On May 13, 1987, Trans-Colorado entered into an agreement with Rocky Mountain Airways to provide it with flights under the Continental Express designation.

Under the terms of the contract, which was in effect through February 28, 1988, Trans-Colorado provided Rocky Mountain with airplanes and crews for $400/block hour for flights operated from May 15, 1987, through December 31, 1987, and $357/block hour for flights operated from December 31, 1987, through February 28, 1988. A minimum of 245 block hours per aircraft per month was guaranteed, averaged over the period of the contract. In addition, Rocky Mountain paid Trans-Colorado a fee for its aircraft that were not leased and for aircraft that were not flown due to weather, air traffic control, and related factors. Rocky Mountain provided the flight schedules, ground handling, and support services for the flights. Flights were to be operated in accordance with Trans-Colorado policies and procedures. The contract specified that Trans-Colorado could neither be sold nor control of the voting stock transferred without the approval of Rocky Mountain. However, the contract stated that "Continental's withholding of consent will not be unreasonable....”

== Financial troubles ==
In the early summer of 1987, Trans-Colorado began to experience serious financial difficulties. In a September 30 letter to a financial organization, a company official stated that "...the only cash that is paid out will be only that which is essential to fulfilling the requirements of the Continental contracts."

On December 3, 1987, Trans-Colorado's chief executive, William Mueller, wrote to employees, saying that "We have begun working on our long term restructure plan, which deals with both creditors and revenue sources. Please hang in with us, as great strides have been taken the last few weeks to stabilize the Company, but we still have a lot of work to do."

After the contract with Rocky Mountain expired, Trans-Colorado then moved its operations and maintenance facilities to Houston, TX, in anticipation of a contract to operate as a feeder to Continental Airlines though another wholly owned Continental subsidiary, Britt Airways.

For several months, Trans-Colorado operated flights for Britt; however, no long-term contract materialized. In April 1988, Trans-Colorado filed Chapter 11 bankruptcy protection from its creditors. In July 1988, it ceased operations and voluntarily surrendered its operating certificate to the Federal Aviation Administration. According to Trans-Colorado, the ending of operations happened "as a direct result of economic hardship imposed by Continental Airlines (Britt Airways, Continental Express) when they prematurely terminated our contract with them."

== Destinations ==
According to its timetables between June 1, 1981, and April 1, 1987, Trans-Colorado served the following destinations:

- Alamogordo, NM (Alamogordo-White Sands Regional Airport) (ALM)
- Albuquerque, NM (Hub) (Albuquerque International Sunport) (ABQ)
- Carlsbad, NM (Cavern City Air Terminal) (CNM)
- Cheyenne, WY (Cheyenne Regional Airport) (CYS)
- Colorado Springs, CO (Colorado Springs Municipal Airport) (COS) – Location of company headquarters
- Cortez, CO (Cortez Municipal Airport) (CEZ)
- Denver, CO (Hub) (Stapleton International Airport) (DEN) – Hub
- Durango, CO (Durango-La Plata County Airport) (DRO)
- El Paso, TX (El Paso International Airport) (ELP)
- Farmington, NM (Four Corners Regional Airport) (FMN)
- Gunnison, CO/Crested Butte (Gunnison-Crested Butte Regional Airport) (GUC)
- Montrose, CO (Montrose Regional Airport) (MTJ)
- Riverton, WY (Riverton Regional Airport) (RIW)
- Rock Springs, WY (Sweetwater County Airport) (RKS)
- Roswell, NM (Roswell International Air Center) (ROW)
- Tucson, AZ (Tucson International Airport) (TUS)

The airline also served other destinations during its existence with its feeder service as a Continental Express air carrier.

== Fleet ==
- 2 Convair 580 – painted in the livery of Continental Express
- 10 Fairchild Swearingen Metroliner Metro II and Metro III

== Incidents and accidents ==
- Trans-Colorado Airlines Flight 2286: A Fairchild Metroliner III crashed near Bayfield, Colorado on approach to Durango on January 19, 1988, operated under the Continental Express brand. Both crew members and 7 of 15 passengers died. All but one of the surviving passengers were injured.

== See also ==
- List of defunct airlines of the United States
