= Japan Air Lines Cargo Flight 1045 =

1977 plane flight which crashed in Anchorage, Alaska, U.S.

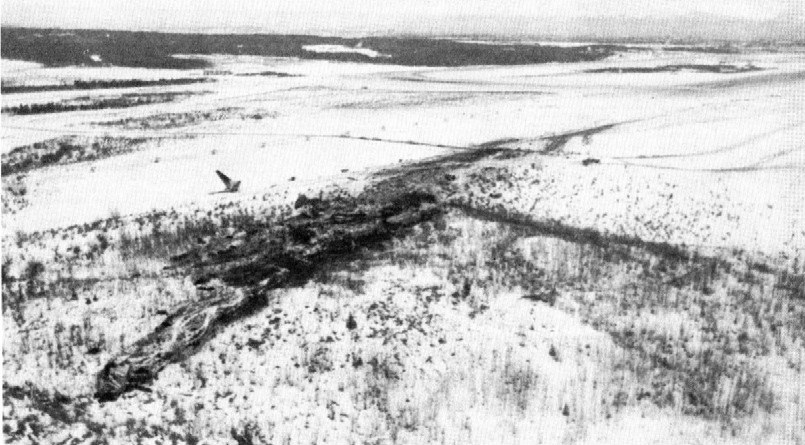
- The crash site of Flight 1045

Accident
- Date: 13 January 1977
- Summary: Stall on takeoff due to pilot error aggravated by intoxication and airframe icing
- Site: Ted Stevens Anchorage International Airport, Anchorage, Alaska, U.S.; 61°10′N 150°2′W

Aircraft
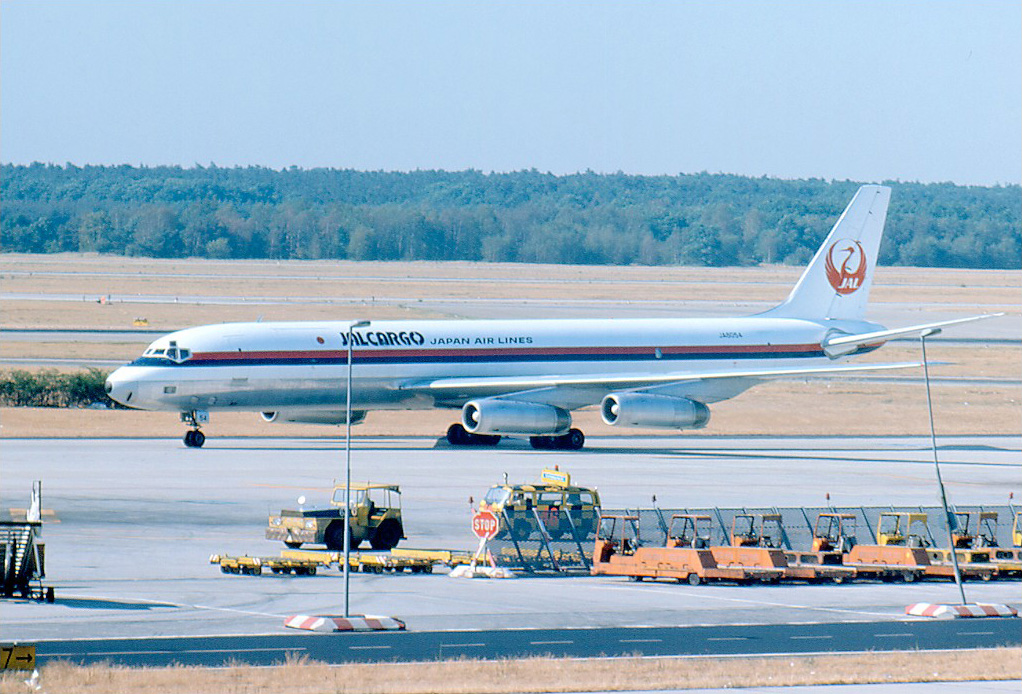
- JA8054, the aircraft involved in the accident, seen in 1976.
- Aircraft type: McDonnell Douglas DC-8-62AF
- Operator: JAL Cargo (Japan Air Lines)
- Call sign: JAPAN AIR 8054
- Registration: JA8054
- Flight origin: Grant County International Airport, Grant County, Washington, U.S.
- Stopover: Ted Stevens Anchorage International Airport, Anchorage, Alaska, U.S.
- Destination: Haneda Airport, Tokyo, Japan
- Occupants: 5
- Passengers: 2
- Crew: 3
- Fatalities: 5
- Survivors: 0

Japan Air Lines Cargo Flight 1045 was a charter flight on January 13, 1977, from Grant County, Washington, to Tokyo, Japan, with a stopover in Anchorage, Alaska. The McDonnell Douglas DC-8-62AF operating the flight crashed during the initial climb shortly after takeoff from Anchorage, in part because the captain, Hugh L. Marsh, was intoxicated as shown by a blood alcohol level of 0.29; the co-pilot and the other crew were not impaired. All of those on board, including three flight crew members, were killed in the crash.

== Aircraft ==
The aircraft involved in the accident was a Douglas DC-8-62AF, equipped with four Pratt & Whitney JT3D engines; registered JA8054 to JAL Cargo, a subsidiary of Japan Air Lines (JAL). The aircraft had a total of 19,744 flight hours, of which 8,708 were since the last major inspection and 45 since the last check. Records showed the aircraft had been maintained within Japanese, American, and ICAO recommendations.

=== Ice on the aircraft ===
Mechanics reported ice present on the inlet guide vanes, engine cowlings and engine bullet noses, but no ice was found on the aircraft surfaces. A mechanic recommended that the engine anti-icing system be used, but no maintenance was performed on the aircraft in Anchorage. Investigators suspected that ice on the airfoil or transducer may have caused the stall warning to fail. The ice present on the surface of the wings and leading edges could have reduced the angle of attack needed to produce a stall.

== Crew ==
On board the aircraft were three flight crew members, two cattle handlers, and live cattle being shipped to Japan as cargo.

The cockpit crew consisted of:

- Captain Hugh L. Marsh, age 53, hired by JAL on June 24, 1969. He was certified to serve as captain of the DC-8 on February 9, 1970; and on October 30, 1969, issued a JCAB airline transport rating, No. 001168, as well as type rated for the DC-8. Due to minor vision impairment he was required to wear corrective glasses for near vision as needed in flight. On September 10, 1970, he was certified as second class navigator. Marsh had logged a total of 23,252 flight hours, including 4,040 hours on the DC-8.
- First officer Kunihika Akitani, age 31, hired by JAL on May 6, 1970, and certified as a copilot on the DC-8 on August 1, 1976. Akitani had 1,603 flight hours, with 1,208 of them on the DC-8.
- Flight engineer Nobumasa Yokokawa, age 35, hired by JAL on April 1, 1960. On November 20, 1960, he received his flight engineer DC-8 type rating. Yokokawa was also certified to serve as flight engineer on Convair 880 and Boeing 747 aircraft. Yokokawa had 4,920 flight hours, including 2,757 hours on the DC-8.

=== Pilot intoxication ===
A taxi driver who drove Captain Marsh to the airport told investigators that he seemed disoriented. At 04:50 local time a taxi dispatcher phoned JAL and warned of an intoxicated pilot. JAL responded by saying there seemed nothing unusual about the flight crew. Autopsies after the crash showed that the captain was heavily intoxicated, with the initial blood alcohol level 298 mg per 100 ml and a vitreous alcohol level of 310 mg per 100 ml taken twelve hours after the crash; the state of Alaska considers 100 mg per 100 ml legally unacceptable for driving. Of the thirteen people questioned who had spoken with Marsh before the flight, six stated he had been drinking or appeared to be drunk.

== Flight synopsis ==
At 05:15 the crew boarded the aircraft; the driver of the crew car stated: "...he was in good condition as far as ways I've seen him sometimes and I made that statement before I ever heard any rumors that he was supposedly drunk or had been partying or whatever" as to whether the pilot appeared intoxicated. Cockpit voice recorder (CVR) data showed that the crew began the prestart checklists at 06:09; CVR data showed the takeoff was normal until the aircraft slowed acceleration from V_{R} to V_{2} speed; the aircraft stalled almost immediately after reaching V_{2} speed. At 06:35:39 AST, JAL Cargo Flight 1045 crashed at Anchorage International Airport shortly after takeoff from runway 24L. A witness reportedly saw the flight climb to approximately 100 feet above the ground, veer to the left, and then slide out of the air. All five people on board the aircraft perished in the crash.

== Cause ==
In January 1979, the National Transportation Safety Board (NTSB) issued their final report, concluding:

The National Transportation Safety Board determines that the probable cause of the accident was a stall that resulted from the pilot's control inputs aggravated by airframe icing while the pilot was under the influence of alcohol. Contributing to the cause of this accident was the failure of the other flightcrew members to prevent the captain from attempting the flight.

== See also ==
- Impact of culture on aviation safety
- Aeroflot Flight 821
- Aero Flight 311
- Trans-Colorado Airlines Flight 2286
