= Aeroflot Flight 821 =

2008 aviation accident in Russia

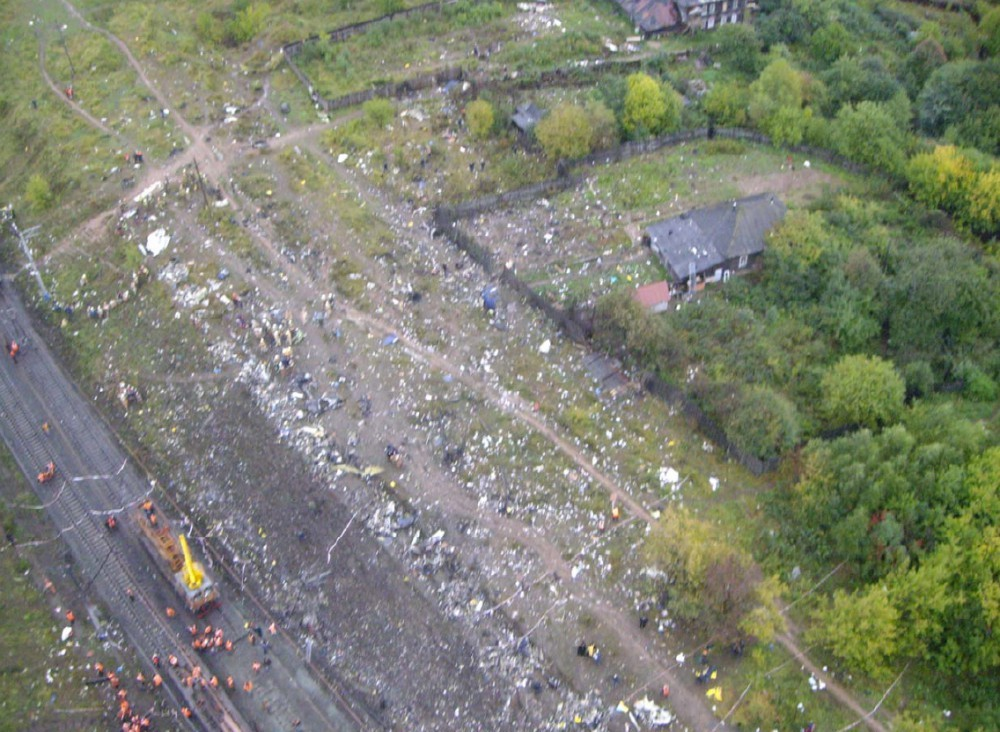
- Aerial view of the crash site

Accident
- Date: 14 September 2008
- Summary: Crashed on approach after instrument confusion, pilot intoxication and loss of situational awareness
- Site: Near Perm International Airport, Perm, Russia; 57°58.255′N 56°12.632′E

Aircraft
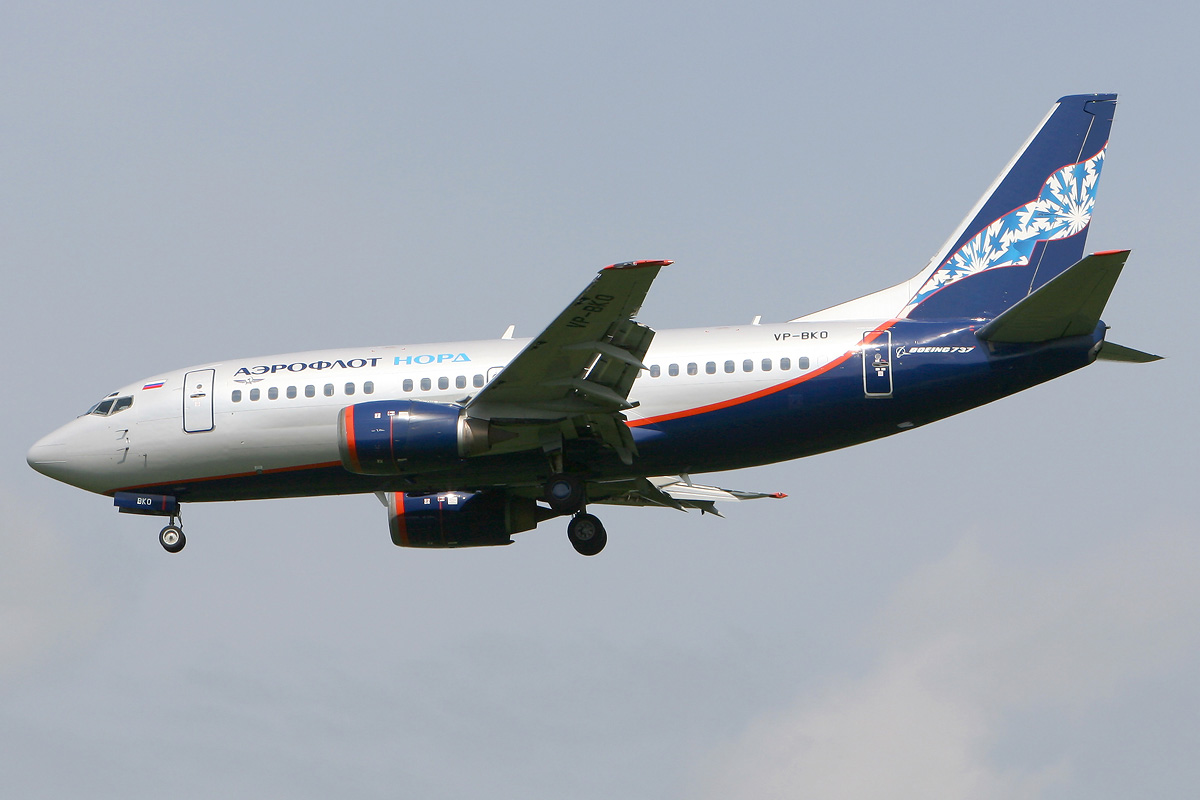
- VP-BKO, the aircraft involved in the accident, seen in July 2008
- Aircraft type: Boeing 737-505
- Operator: Aeroflot-Nord
- IATA flight No.: SU821
- ICAO flight No.: AFL821
- Call sign: AEROFLOT 821
- Registration: VP-BKO
- Flight origin: Sheremetyevo International Airport, Moscow, Russia
- Destination: Perm International Airport, Perm, Russia
- Occupants: 88
- Passengers: 82
- Crew: 6
- Fatalities: 88
- Survivors: 0

Aeroflot Flight 821 was a scheduled domestic passenger flight operated by Aeroflot-Nord, a lease airline by Aeroflot with a service agreement with Aeroflot and as its subsidiary. On 14 September 2008, the Boeing 737-500 operating the flight crashed on approach to Perm International Airport at 05:10 local time (UTC+06). All 82 passengers and six crew members were killed. Among the passengers who were killed was Russian Colonel General Gennady Troshev, an adviser to the President of Russia who had been the commander of the North Caucasus Military District (including Chechnya) during the Second Chechen War. A section of the Trans-Siberian Railway was damaged by the crash. Flight 821 was the deadliest accident involving a Boeing 737-500, surpassing the 1993 crash of Asiana Airlines Flight 733, and was the second-deadliest aviation accident of 2008, behind Spanair Flight 5022.

The primary cause of the crash was that both pilots had lost spatial orientation due to their inexperience with the Western type of attitude indicator on the aircraft. Lack of adequate rest, poor crew resource management, and alcohol consumption by the captain also contributed to the accident.

This air disaster led to Aeroflot-Nord rebranding as Nordavia, effective on 1 December 2009, and later to Smartavia in 2019.

== Accident ==
The Boeing 737-505, registered as VP-BKO, an aircraft belonging to the Aeroflot subsidiary Aeroflot-Nord but operating as Aeroflot flight SU821, was travelling from Moscow's Sheremetyevo International Airport to Perm (Russia). The aircraft crashed into a railway line southwest of Perm at 5:10 am local time (13 September 2008, 23:10 UTC). The area was rainy at time of the accident (unbroken clouds at 240 metres (790 ft), light rain).

According to an interview given by the air traffic controller shortly after the disaster, the crew did not respond correctly to ATC commands: after going around, it turned eastward instead of westward. However, the crew reported no emergency onboard and confirmed all commands given by ATC. At 5:10 am, radio contact with the plane was lost as it crashed on the outskirts of Perm.

Aeroflot-Nord officially stated that: "The Boeing-737 carried 82 passengers on board – including seven children – and six crew. All passengers and crew were killed. As the plane was coming in for landing, it lost communication at a height of 1,100 metres (3,600 ft) and air controllers lost its blip. The airplane was found within Perm's city limits completely destroyed and on fire." Investigator Vladimir Markin said that "there were 82 passengers plus a baby and 5 crew on board, and by preliminary information, they are all dead as the airplane fell into a ravine near the city limits." RIA Novosti however reported that "it was possible that three people who bought a ticket for the ill-fated flight 821 to Perm did not get on board."

Both flight recorders were found and successfully decoded. The airline stated, "it pledged to pay compensation on obligatory accident insurance in full, which would make up to 2 million rubles per victim." The crash damaged and shut down a section of the Trans-Siberian Railway; rail traffic was temporarily re-routed via Chusovaya station and was restored by the evening of 14 September. The aircraft was leased by Aeroflot-Nord from Dublin-based Pinewatch Limited from July 2008 to March 2013.

It was reported that its engines caught fire at an altitude of 1,000 metres (3,300 ft). Eyewitness reports stated that the plane was visibly on fire prior to crashing and hit the ground at a 30–40-degree angle. However, the low clouds (at 240 metres (790 ft)) must have prevented any witnesses from seeing the plane for more than a few seconds and the report was subsequently discounted by the accident enquiry (see below).

The final enquiry report stated that "after the base turn, approaching the landing course at 600 metres (2,000 ft) with both autopilot and autothrottle disengaged, the aircraft started climbing up to 1,300 metres (4,300 ft), rolled 360° over the left wing and collided with the ground".

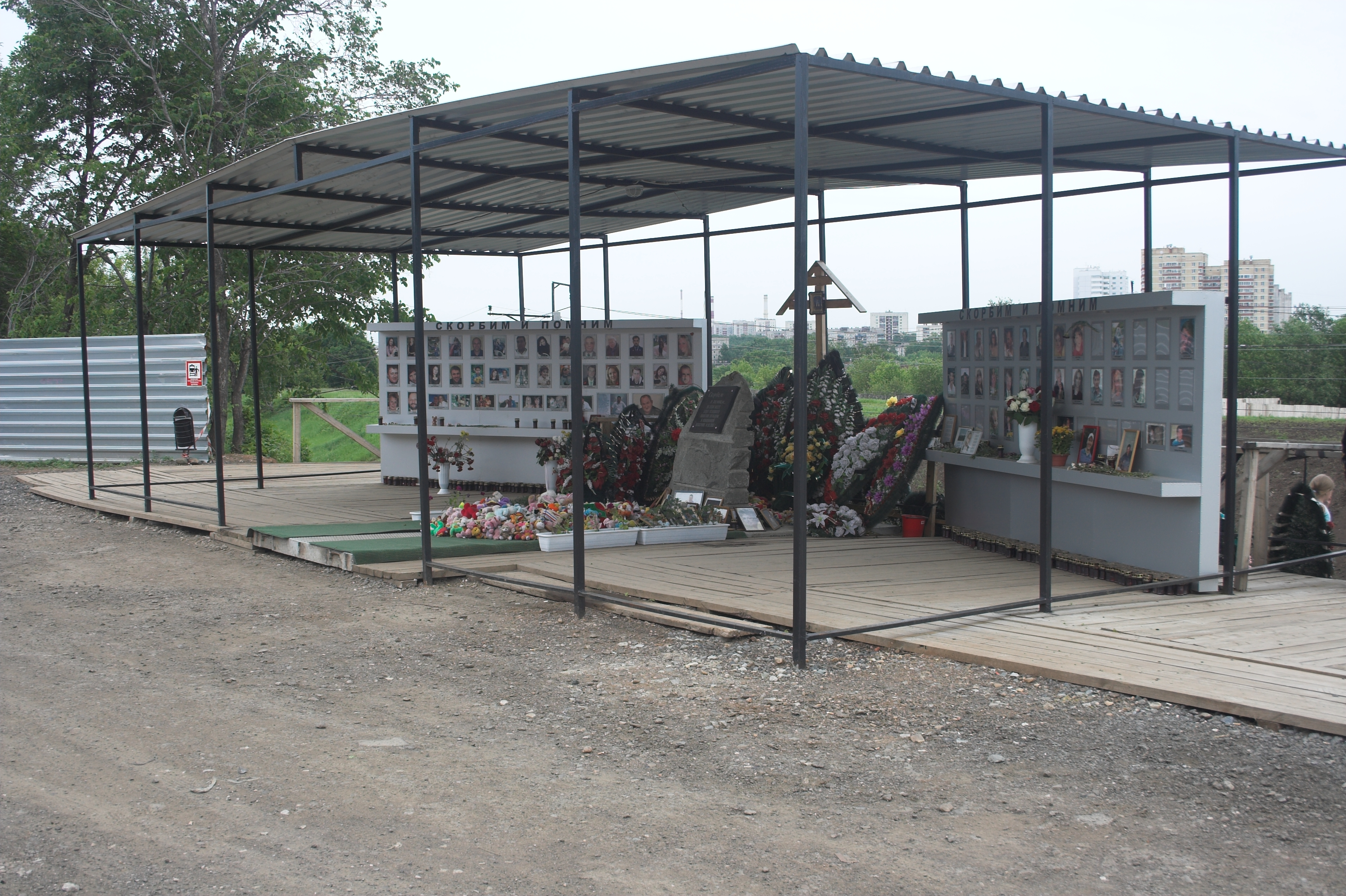
Memorial

== Aircraft ==
The aircraft involved in the crash was originally ordered by Braathens, but never operated by them and was quickly sold shortly after delivery to Xiamen Airlines, who operated it from September 1992 to March 1993. The 737 was then operated by China Southwest Airlines itself until the airline merged with Air China, who operated the aircraft from 2003 until it was stored in March 2008 and was returned to Pinewatch Limited. Aeroflot-Nord then leased the aircraft and had operated the airframe from 29 May 2008 until its hull loss.

== Crew ==
According to early claims of Aeroflot-Nord representatives, the crew was described as very experienced and one of the best in the company. Captain Rodion Mikhailovich Medvedev (Russian: Родион Михайлович Медведев; age 34) had a flight record of 3,689 hours (including 1,190 hours on the Boeing 737) while First Officer Rustem Rafailovich Allaberdin (Russian: Рустем Рафаилович Аллабердин; age 43) had 8,713 hours, though only 219 of them were on the Boeing 737. Later it was revealed that Medvedev's flight record as a captain was 452 hours along with Allaberdin's low experience of piloting the Boeing 737. For the most part of their careers, Medvedev and Allaberdin had piloted the Tupolev Tu-134 and Antonov An-2 respectively. Gennady Kurzenkov, head of the State Aviation Inspection Service, stated that the flight crew submitted falsified documents to the airline showing that they had passed preflight courses.

== Casualties ==
Nationality	Casualties
Russia	66
Azerbaijan	8
Ukraine	5
Belarus	1
China	1
France	2
Germany	1
Italy	1
Latvia	1
Turkey	1
Uzbekistan	1
Total	88

=== Notable deaths ===
- Gennady Troshev, Colonel General in the Russian military, formerly the commander of the North Caucasus Military District (including Chechnya) during the Second Chechen War and adviser to the President of Russia.

== Investigation ==
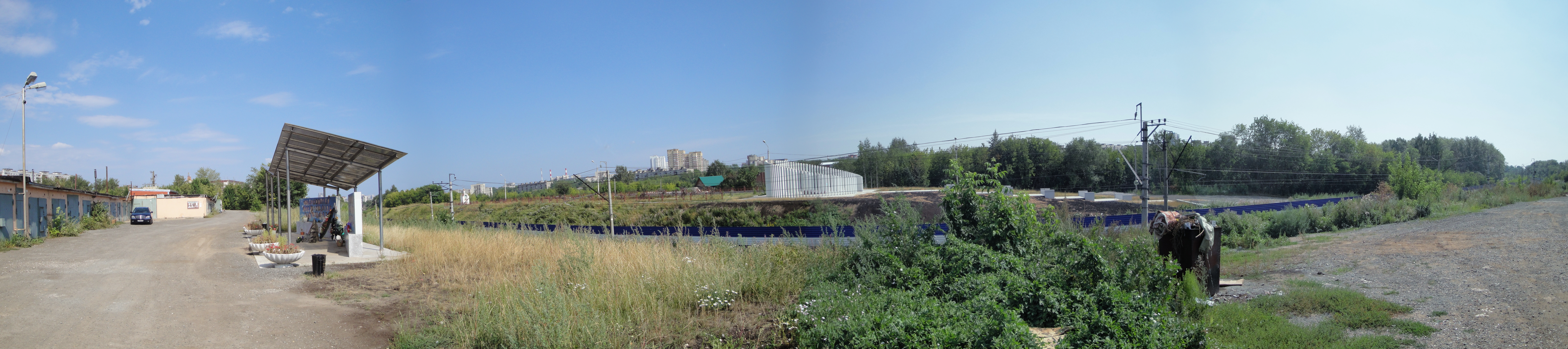
Panorama of the crash site and the memorial.

Russia's Air Accident Investigation Commission of the Interstate Aviation Committee led the investigation, with US assistance from the National Transportation Safety Board, the Federal Aviation Administration, and Boeing. As the aircraft was registered in Bermuda, that government was represented by the UK's Air Accidents Investigation Branch, with two senior inspectors sent to participate under the Memorandum of Agreement. The AAIB team had representatives from the Bermudian Department of Civil Aviation as advisors. The engines were made in France, so that state was represented by the Bureau of Enquiry and Analysis for Civil Aviation Safety (BEA).

According to the data in flight recorders, the engines did not catch fire and continued working until the impact. The latest official reports are published in Russian on the Air Accident Investigation Commission website. An English translation of the final report is available at the United Kingdom Air Accidents Investigation Branch website; the AAIB states that it is not an official English translation.

The final investigation report stated the following reasons for the crash:

- The immediate cause of the accident was the loss of spatial orientation by the crew and chiefly by the captain, who was piloting the aircraft during the landing phase. The plane banked left, overturned and went into a rapid descent. The loss of spatial orientation occurred in the night, while flying in the clouds, with autopilot and autothrottle switched off. Poor crew resource management and insufficient training for using the Western type of attitude indicators contributed to the accident. The pilots had previously flown Tupolev Tu-134 and Antonov An-2 with a different type of attitude indicator (where the bank angle is shown by the movements of an aircraft symbol, and the indicator's background does not turn left or right).
- Inadequate practices by Aeroflot-Nord in managing and operating the Boeing 737 aircraft.
- The aircraft had been flown for a long time with a throttle problem. The pilots had a higher workload because they had to operate the throttle levers for the left and right engines independently.
- Forensic examination found alcohol in the captain's tissue, with different sample groups suggesting a blood alcohol level of either around 0.05% or around 0.11% abv. He also did not have adequate rest before the flight.

== Lawsuit ==
On 1 October 2008, the mother of a 27-year-old female passenger who died in the accident sued Aeroflot and Moskva Insurance Company for 7.7 million rubles (approximately US$300,000) in punitive damages.

== ATC communications before the crash ==
A recording of the conversation between ATC and Flight 821 was published online. According to the final investigation report, the captain, who was making the communications, was 'mildly intoxicated', and this can be heard in the audio.

Irek Birbov, the air traffic controller on duty at the time of the accident, said that on final approach the aircraft was too far right of the localizer. He advised the captain to change heading. Furthermore, instead of descending to land, the plane then went up.

The controller requested Flight 821 to check the altitude: "According to my data, you are climbing. Confirm current altitude 900 meters (3,000 ft)." The aircraft should have been at an altitude of 600 metres (2,000 ft) at that time to descend further 300 metres (980 ft). The pilot replied "Roger, we are descending" and initiated a climb to about 1200 m, at which point he could no longer catch the glideslope. The controller instructed the pilot to turn right and go around. The captain acknowledged but failed to comply. Instead, he turned left and asked to continue his approach. The controller asked whether everything was all right with the crew; the pilots confirmed that it was.

The controller then insisted on a go-around, instructing them to switch to another ATC frequency. The pilots, however, never contacted the other ATC and started to descend quickly. When they were at about 600 metres (2,000 ft), the controller radioed the plane to maintain 600 metres (2,000 ft). In response, the pilots' final radio transmission was "Aaa (expletive)!" A moment later the controller saw an explosion.

== In popular culture ==
The accident was featured in the 19th season of the TV series Mayday. The episode is titled "Lethal Limits".

== See also ==
- Adam Air Flight 574
- Aero Flight 311
- Crossair Flight 498
- Flash Airlines Flight 604
- Indonesia AirAsia Flight 8501
- Japan Air Lines Cargo Flight 1045
- Trans-Colorado Airlines Flight 2286, an accident where a captain impaired by cocaine failed to correct a first officer making multiple pilot errors.
- Flydubai Flight 981, another Boeing 737 which crashed in Russia due to spatial disorientation.
- TAROM Flight 371, another accident involving asymmetrical thrust as well as a pilot becoming confused with a Western style ADI.
- Manx2 Flight 7100, another accident where pilots mishandled an engine power imbalance, leading to a roll.
