= Continental Express =

Regional airline of the United States (1986–2012)

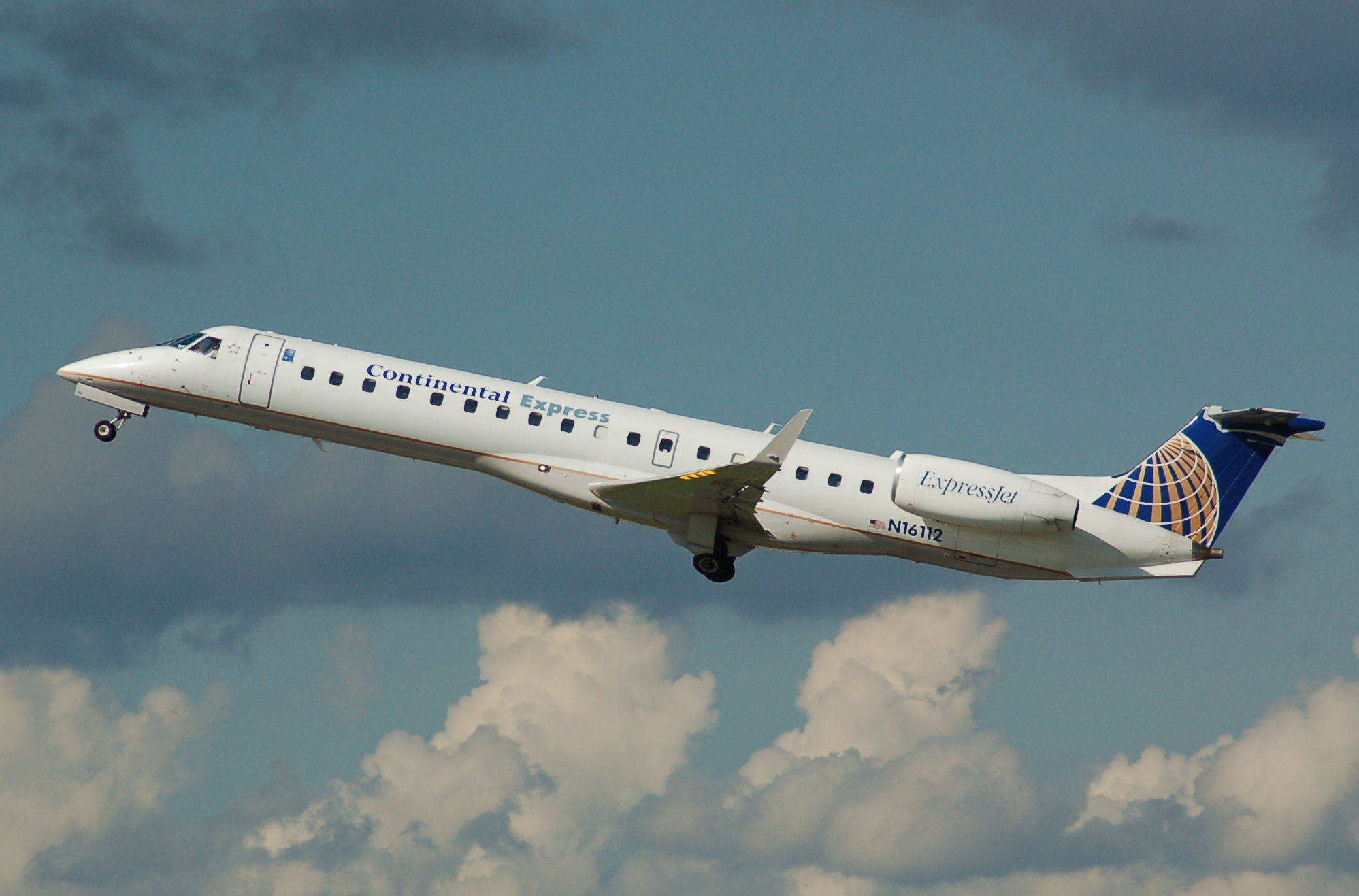
- Embraer 145 operated by ExpressJet in 2010
IATA	ICAO	Call sign
PT; QO; JC; XE; RP	PBA; AJC; RMA; BTA; CHQ	PBA; BAR HARBOR; ROCKY MOUNTAIN; JET LINK; CHAUTAUQUA
- Founded: 1986
- Ceased operations: March 3, 2012 (merged into United Express)
- Hubs: Cleveland; Denver–Stapleton (1986–1995); Houston–Intercontinental; Newark
- Frequent-flyer program: OnePass
- Alliance: SkyTeam (affiliate; 2004–2009); Star Alliance (affiliate; 2009–2012)
- Parent company: Continental Airlines (1986–2010); United Airlines (2010–2012)
- Headquarters: Houston, Texas, U.S.

Continental Express was the brand name used by a number of independently owned regional airlines providing commuter airliner and regional jet feeder service under agreement with Continental Airlines. In 2010 at the time of Continental's merger with United Airlines, two carriers were operating using the Continental Express brand name:

- SkyWest, Inc.' carrier ExpressJet (206 aircraft, more than 90% of Continental Express flights)
- Republic Airways Holdings' carrier Chautauqua Airlines (14 aircraft, just under 10% of Continental Express flights)

Continental Express, operated by ExpressJet and Chautauqua, offered service to approximately 150 destinations in the United States, Canada, Mexico and the Caribbean, from Continental's hubs in Houston, Newark and Cleveland. ExpressJet operated as a Continental Express and United Express carrier, while Chautauqua also operated flights as Delta Connection, US Airways Express, Frontier Airlines, Midwest Connect, Trans World Express, America West Express, and AmericanConnection. Continental Express operated more flights to Mexico more than any other airline from its hub George Bush Intercontinental Airport.

Following the merger of Continental with United, the "Continental Express" brand was discontinued and such flight services were renamed as United Express.

== History ==
Continental Express/ExpressJet was at one time a wholly owned subsidiary of Continental Airlines, Inc. In this previous incarnation before its divestiture various air carriers operating as Continental Express flew turboprop aircraft such as the ATR 42, ATR 72, Beechcraft Model 99, Beechcraft 1900, Convair 580, de Havilland Canada Dash 7, Embraer EMB 110, Embraer EMB 120, Fairchild F-27, Fairchild Metroliner, Grumman Gulfstream I and NAMC YS-11. Continental Express/ExpressJet was formed through the merger of four separate commuter airlines that were wholly owned by Continental: Provincetown-Boston Airlines, of Hyannis, MA, Bar Harbor Airlines, of Bangor, ME, Britt Airways, of Terre Haute, IN, and Rocky Mountain Airways, of Denver, CO. As part of the consolidation of the four commuter operations, the PBA and Rocky Mountain operating certificates were retired. The Bar Harbor certificate went to Eastern Airlines for its Florida Eastern Express division. The combined company that became Continental Express/ExpressJet operated under the Britt Airways operating certificate until November 2011, at which time all ExpressJet operations became part of the Atlantic Southeast Airlines certificate. Continental Express also served Continental's Denver and Guam hubs until the early 1990s.

Continental Express was formed in 1986. Since the 1978 deregulation of the U.S. airline industry, U.S. carriers increasingly contracted flying to smaller destinations with small regional carriers; David Messing, a spokesperson with Continental Airlines Holdings in 1991, said that Continental Express was formed because, from a business standpoint, having one subsidiary airline for Continental was preferable to the previous scenario of numerous agreements with various smaller airlines.

In the 1990s the airline was headquartered in the Gateway II office complex near the grounds of Houston Intercontinental Airport in Houston.

On Thursday, September 4, 1997, Continental Express had its first regional jet flight. On Sunday September 7, 1997 Continental Express moved its operations at Bush Intercontinental Airport from Terminal C to Terminal B.

In the past, Trans-Colorado Airlines of Denver, CO, Royale Airlines of Shreveport, LA, Air New Orleans of Birmingham, AL, Mid Pacific Airlines of Honolulu, HI, City Express of Toronto, Ontario, Colgan Airways of Manassas, VA, Southern Jersey Airways of Atlantic City New Jersey, and Gull Air of Hyannis, MA, have operated non-jet aircraft (primarily turboprops) using the Continental Express brand name. Emerald Air of Austin, TX and Royale Airlines also operated Douglas DC-9-10 jet service while Mid Pacific Air operated Fokker F28 jets and Presidential Airways of Herndon, VA flew British Aerospace BAe 146-200 jets on behalf of Continental.

== Continental Connection and Continental Commuter ==
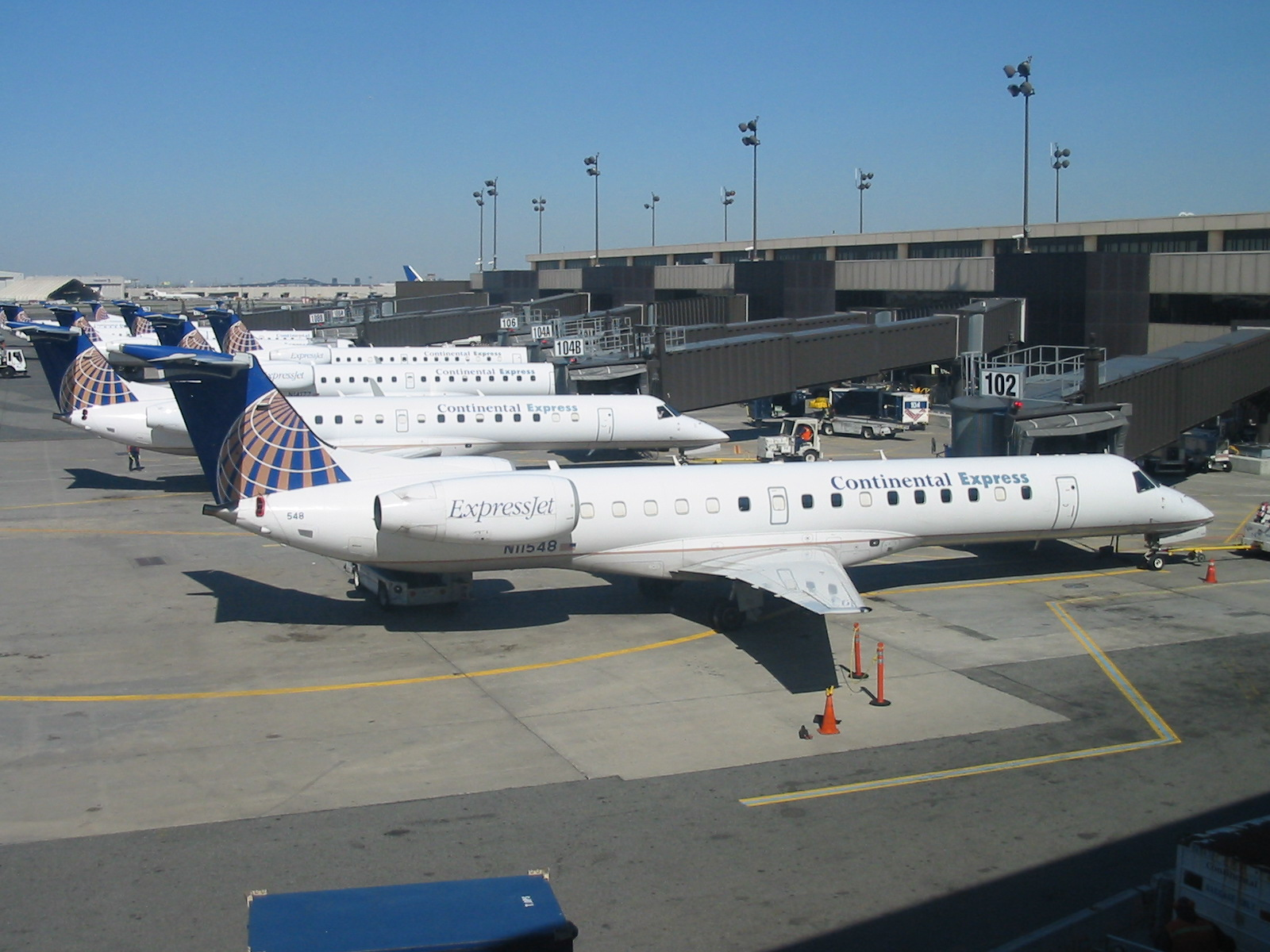
The world's largest operator of ERJs is ExpressJet, under the colors of Continental Express

Continental Airlines had contracted with other airlines such as Cape Air, of Barnstable, MA, Colgan Air, of Manassas, VA, CommutAir, of South Burlington, VT, GP Express Airlines, of Grand Island, NE, Gulfstream International, of Dania Beach, FL, and SkyWest Airlines, of St. George, UT to operate non-jet aircraft as Continental Connection on short-haul routes beginning in the mid 1990s. The "Continental Connection" brand name was used to identify non-jet, hosted codeshare airlines, while "Continental Express" was used as the marketing name for regional jet and some turboprop hosted codeshare operations. For example, ATR 42, ATR 72 and Embraer EMB 120 propjet flights were operated from the Houston hub as "Continental Express".

American Eagle Airlines, of Los Angeles, CA also operated turboprop aircraft as a code-share on behalf of Continental Airlines but was not known as Continental Connection.

Pioneer Airlines of Denver, CO and Royale Airlines of Shreveport, LA operated as Continental Commuter carriers from 1983 through 1986 and were the first code-sharing feeder carrier's on behalf of Continental Airlines. Pioneer was the feeder at Continental's Denver hub but ceased operations in mid-1986. Royale was the feeder at the Houston hub utilizing Douglas DC-9-10 jets as well as Grumman Gulfstream I propjets in addition to other commuter turboprop aircraft types and was reclassified as Continental Express by the fall of 1986.

== Other subsidiary airline operations ==
Two additional airlines worthy of note, which operated in connection with Continental Airlines, were New York Air and Continental West, of Los Angeles, both of which operated mainline jet aircraft. New York Air began operations in 1980 between Boston, New York/LaGuardia, and Washington/National, flying McDonnell Douglas DC-9-30 and MD-80 jetliners, while Continental West – in a sense a predecessor of CALite – started in 1985, operating an hourly shuttle between Los Angeles and San Jose with Boeing 737-300 jets. Both airlines were started by Continental's holding company, Texas Air, in an effort to operate low cost flights, and both were folded into Continental in 1986. In addition, a third independent air carrier, Emerald Air of Austin, TX, operated the "Houston Proud Express" Douglas DC-9-10 jet shuttle service on a short, crosstown route between Houston Intercontinental Airport (IAH) and Houston Hobby Airport (HOU) in the mid 1980s.

== Operators and fleet ==
=== Fleet ===
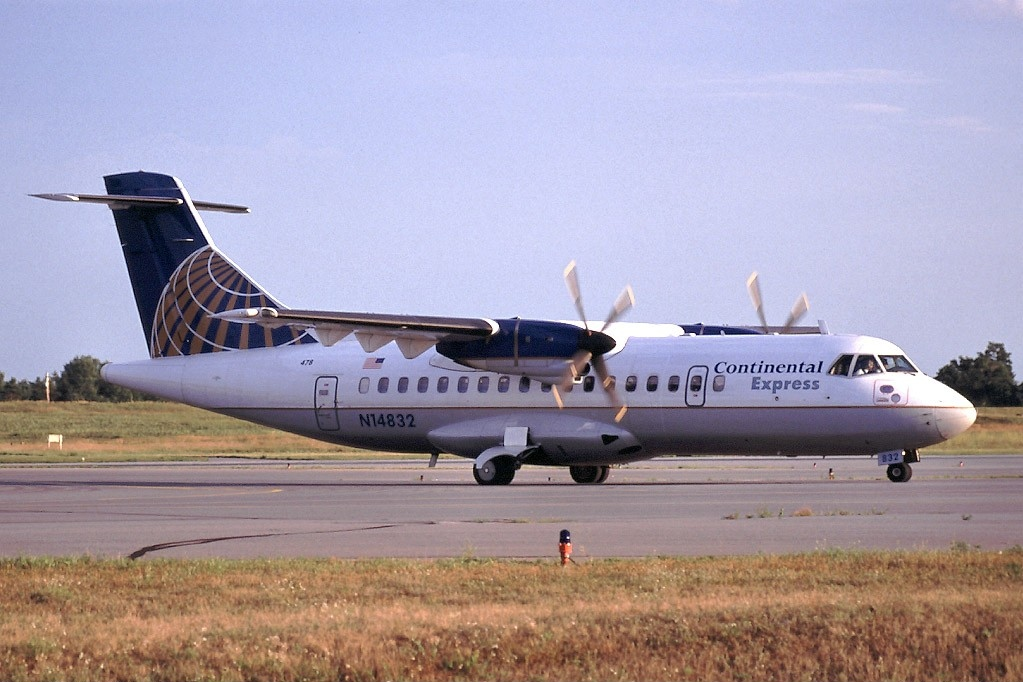
Continental Express ATR 42

ExpressJet Holdings announced on December 28, 2005, that it received notice from Continental Airlines of its intention to reduce by 69 the number of aircraft ExpressJet will operate for Continental under the companies' capacity purchase agreement. Per the agreement, ExpressJet could return the aircraft to Continental, or lease them from Continental at a higher rate and operate as a regional feeder for another airline.

As announced by Continental, the withdrawal of aircraft from the agreement was expected to begin in January 2007 and be completed during summer 2007. Simultaneously, Continental announced its intention to request proposals from other regional carriers to lease and operate the returned aircraft, beginning in January 2007. Continental announced in April 2006 that Chautauqua Airlines had been awarded a contract to operate the 69 aircraft owned by Continental.

ExpressJet later announced its intention to operate the 69 aircraft independently, at increased lease rates. As a result, Chautauqua was forced to add a new fleet type.

In July 2006, Continental Airlines announced a new contract, in which Chautauqua Airlines would provide and operate regional jets as a Continental Express carrier. As of 2009, Continental Express consisted of 214 aircraft operated by ExpressJet Airlines, and 20 aircraft operated by Chautauqua Airlines. All Express flights were then operated with regional jet aircraft; however Continental Connection flights were operated with prop aircraft configured with as few as nine seats.

By 2008 however, ExpressJet then decided to end all of its independent flying and operate all flights once again as a Continental Express carrier until November 30, 2011.

Continental Express fleet
Airline	IATA service	ICAO code	Callsign	Aircraft	Passengers	Parent							
Airline	IATA service	ICAO code	Callsign	Aircraft	Passengers	Parent	Chautauqua Airlines	RP	CHQ	Chautauqua	Embraer ERJ 145	50	Republic Airways Holdings
ExpressJet	EV	ASQ	ACEY	Embraer ERJ 135	37	ManaAir, LLC.							
ExpressJet	EV	ASQ	ACEY	Embraer ERJ 145	50	ManaAir, LLC.							

=== Historical fleet ===
The Continental Express brand, through its various regional and commuter airline partners, operated a variety of aircraft over the years including the following types:

- ATR 42
- ATR 72
- BAe 146-200
- Beechcraft Model 99
- Beechcraft 1900C
- Beechcraft 1900D
- Bombardier CRJ200
- Convair 580
- de Havilland Canada Dash 7
- Embraer EMB 110
- Embraer EMB 120
- Fairchild F-27
- Fairchild Metroliner
- Grumman Gulfstream I
- NAMC YS-11

== Accidents and incidents ==
- On May 26, 1987, Air New Orleans Flight 2962, operating under the Continental Express brand name with a British Aerospace BAe Jetstream 31 commuter propjet (Registration N331CY), crash-landed just after takeoff from New Orleans International Airport. The plane crashed into eight lanes of traffic on U.S. 61 adjacent to the airfield and subsequently injured two persons on the ground. Of the 11 occupants on board, there were zero fatalities. The cause of the crash was attributed to pilot error, including failing to follow checklists.
- On January 19, 1988, Trans-Colorado Airlines Flight 2286, a Fairchild Metro III operated under the Continental Express brand, crashed near Bayfield, Colorado. Both crew members and 7 of 15 passengers died. Of the surviving passengers one received major injuries and six received minor injuries, and one received no injuries.
- On September 11, 1991, Continental Express Flight 2574, flown by Britt Airways, was a scheduled domestic passenger flight from Laredo International Airport in Laredo, Texas to Houston Intercontinental Airport in Houston, Texas. The Embraer EMB 120 Brasilia crashed as it was descending towards Houston, killing all 14 people on board. An investigation by the National Transportation Safety Board found that an improperly-maintained horizontal stabilizer failed during approach, causing a severe nose-down pitchover and breakup of the plane.
- On January 21, 1998, a Continental Express ATR-42, N15827, had an emergency during roll on landing. During the landing roll, a fire erupted in the right engine. The airplane was stopped on the runway, the engines were shut down and the occupants evacuated. The fire handles for both engines were pulled and both fire bottles on the right engine discharged. However, the fire in the right engine continued to burn. The airport fire services attended shortly afterward and extinguished the fire.
- On July 28, 1999, Continental Express Flight 3402, an ATR 42 (also flown by Britt Airways), had just landed at Little Rock National Airport and was taxiing to the ramp when the station manager was struck by the propeller of the left engine and killed.

== Gallery ==
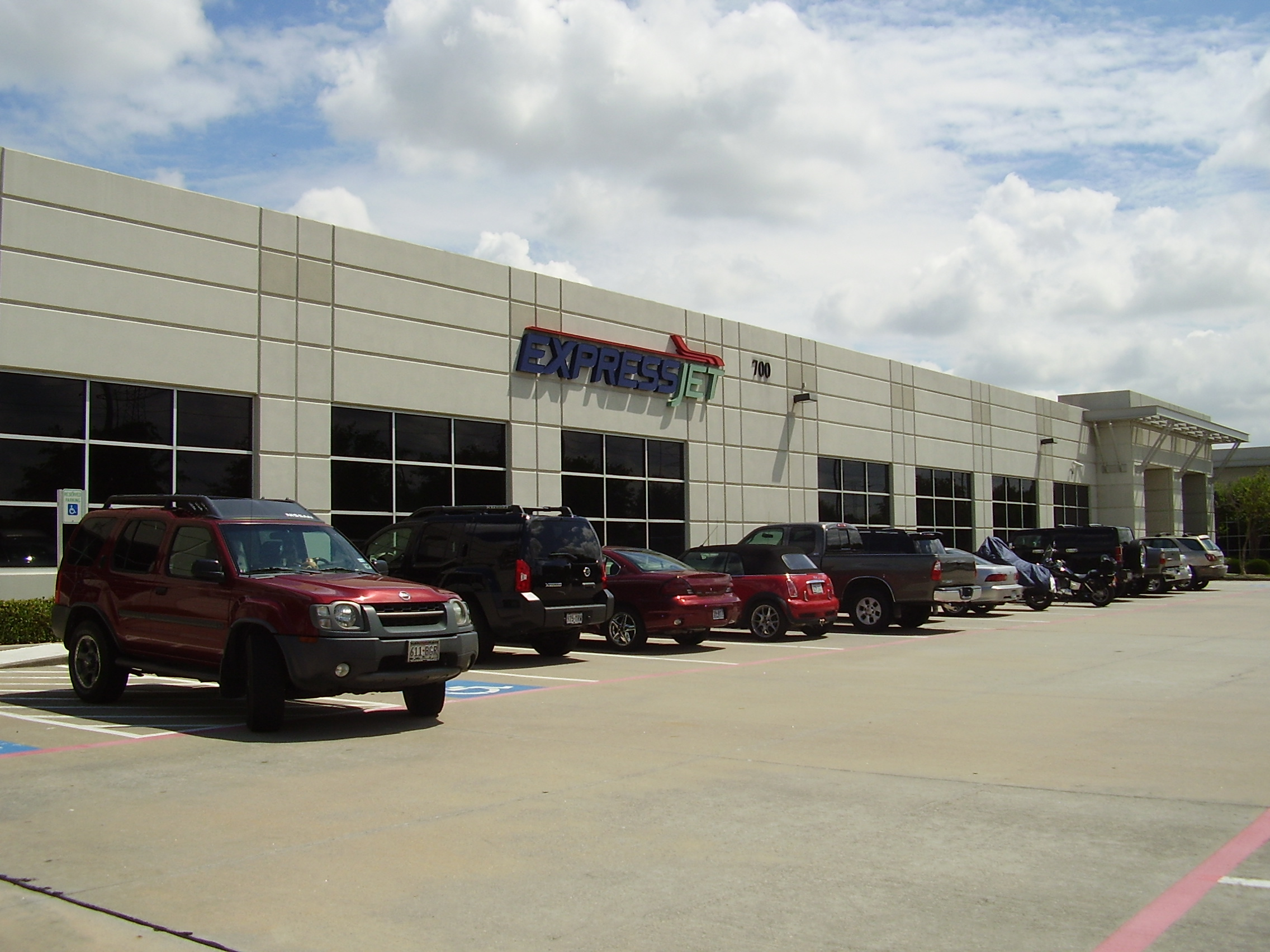
ExpressJet former headquarters in Greenspoint, Houston (ExpressJet is now headquartered in College Park, Georgia.)

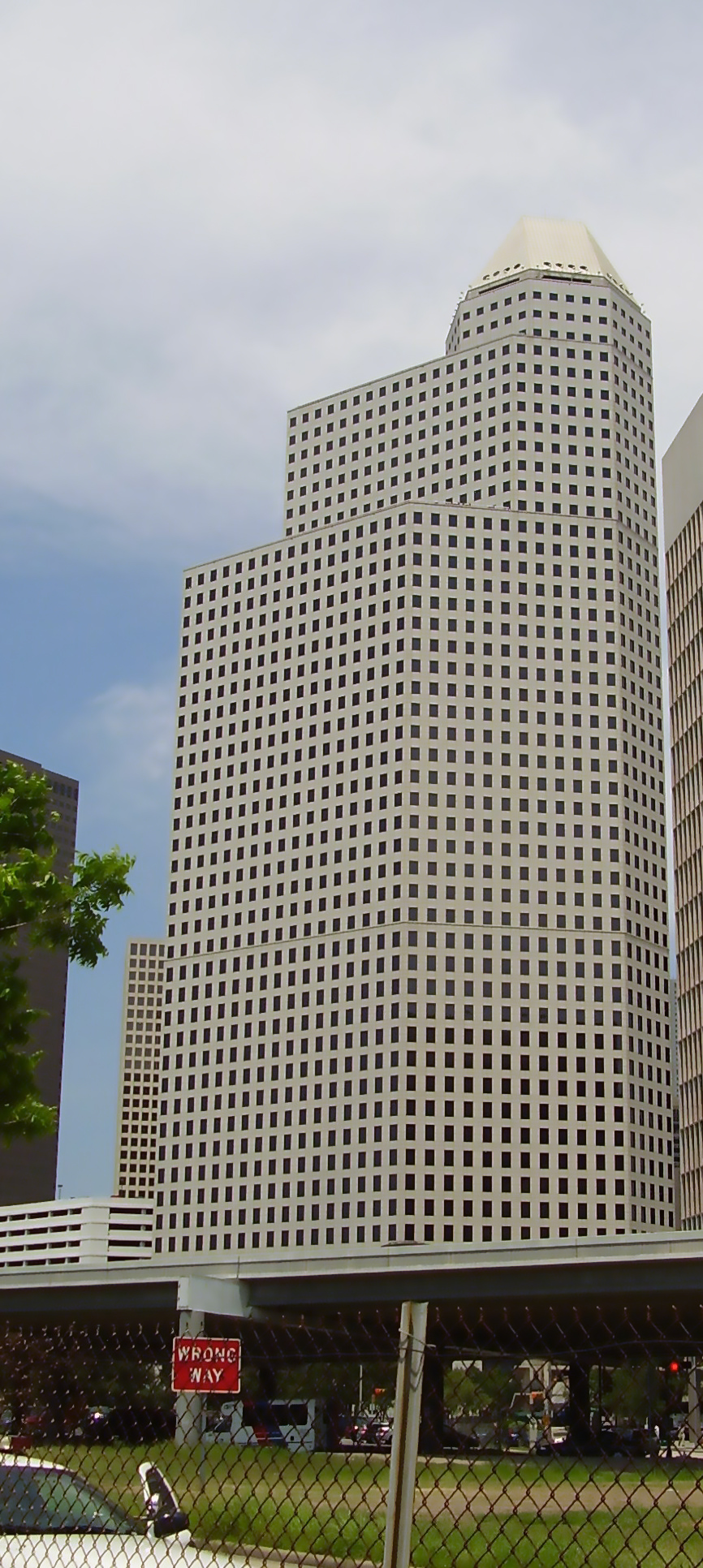
Continental Center I, Continental Airlines's headquarters in Downtown Houston, formerly housed ExpressJet's headquarters.

== See also ==
- List of defunct airlines of the United States
