= Aero Flight 311 =

1961 aviation accident in Kvevlax, Finland

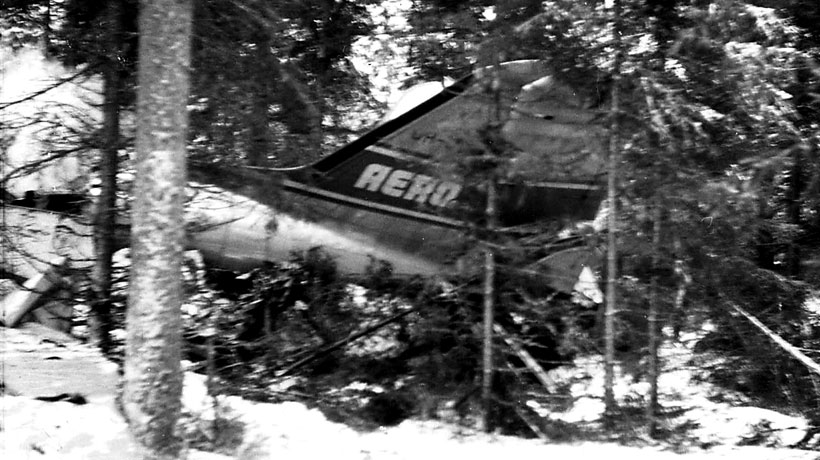
- The tail of OH-LCC at the crash site

Accident
- Date: 3 January 1961
- Summary: Pilot error aggravated by alcohol intoxication, stall
- Site: Kvevlax, Korsholm, Ostrobothnia, Finland; 63°08′25″N 21°49′58″E

Aircraft
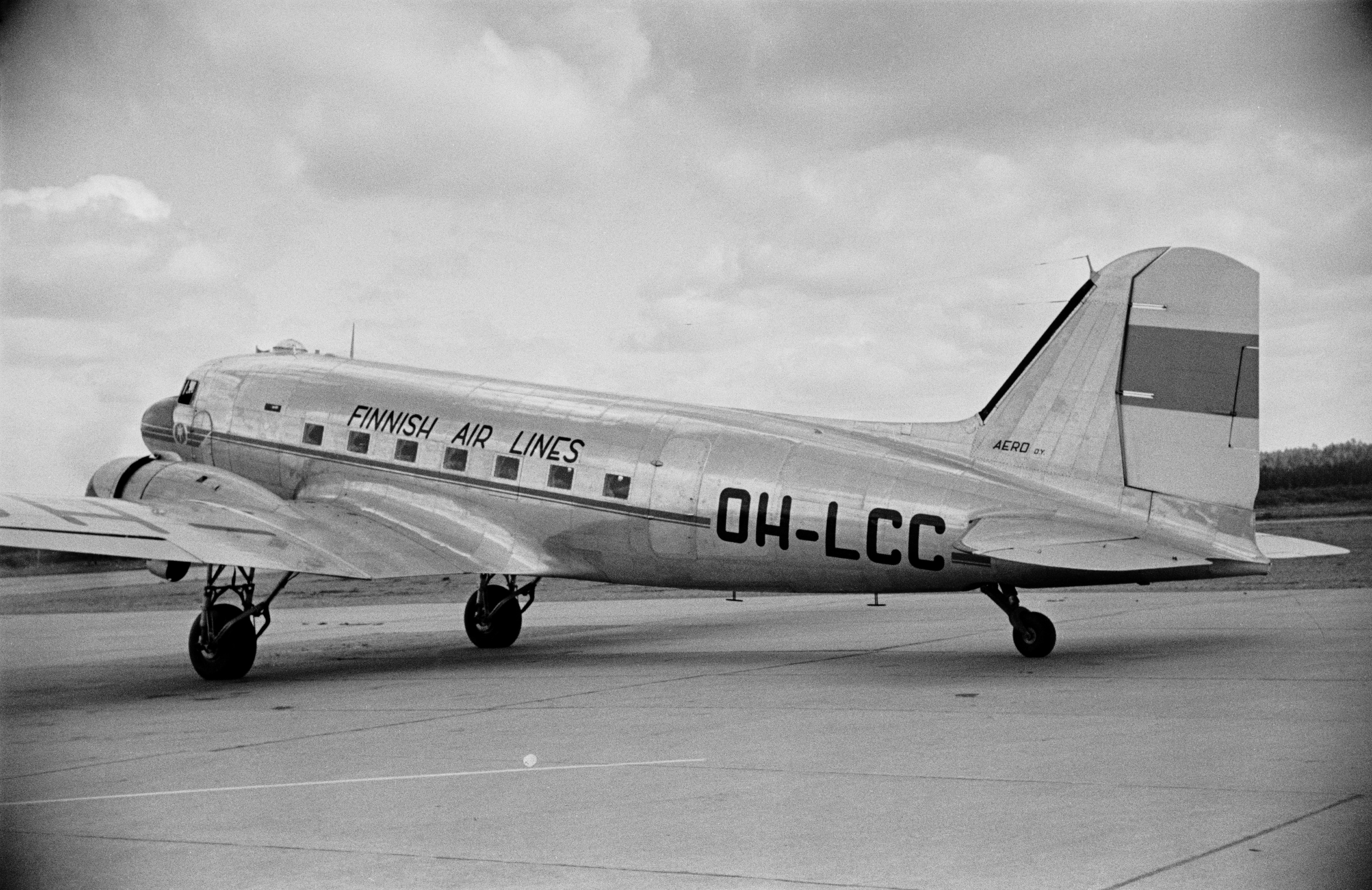
- OH-LCC, the aircraft involved in the accident, seen in 1947 in a previous livery.
- Aircraft type: Douglas DC-3
- Operator: Aero O/Y
- Registration: OH-LCC
- Flight origin: Kronoby Airport
- Destination: Vaasa Airport
- Occupants: 25
- Passengers: 22
- Crew: 3
- Fatalities: 25
- Survivors: 0

Aero Flight 311, often referred to as the Kvevlax air disaster, was a scheduled domestic passenger flight operated by Aero O/Y (now Finnair) between Kronoby and Vaasa in Finland. The aircraft, a Douglas DC-3, crashed in the municipality Kvevlax (Finnish: Koivulahti), nowadays part of Korsholm (Finnish: Mustasaari) on 3 January 1961, killing all twenty-five people on board. The disaster remains the deadliest aviation accident in Finnish history. The investigation revealed that both pilots were intoxicated and should not have been flying.

== Flight chronology ==
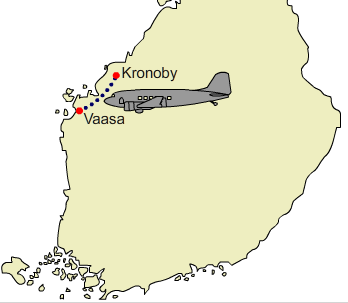
Flight route

The Douglas DC-3, registered OH-LCC, was scheduled for take-off from Kronoby Airport at 07:00, but take-off preparations were late, and the plane departed at 07:16. The co-pilot requested free flying altitude from the air traffic control, which was permitted. This allowed Flight 311 to fly at any altitude above the minimum flight altitude for the Kronoby-Vaasa route, which was 1,500 feet (460 m). The pilots did not follow these regulations for the last 40 kilometres (25 mi), during which they flew below 100 metres (330 ft).

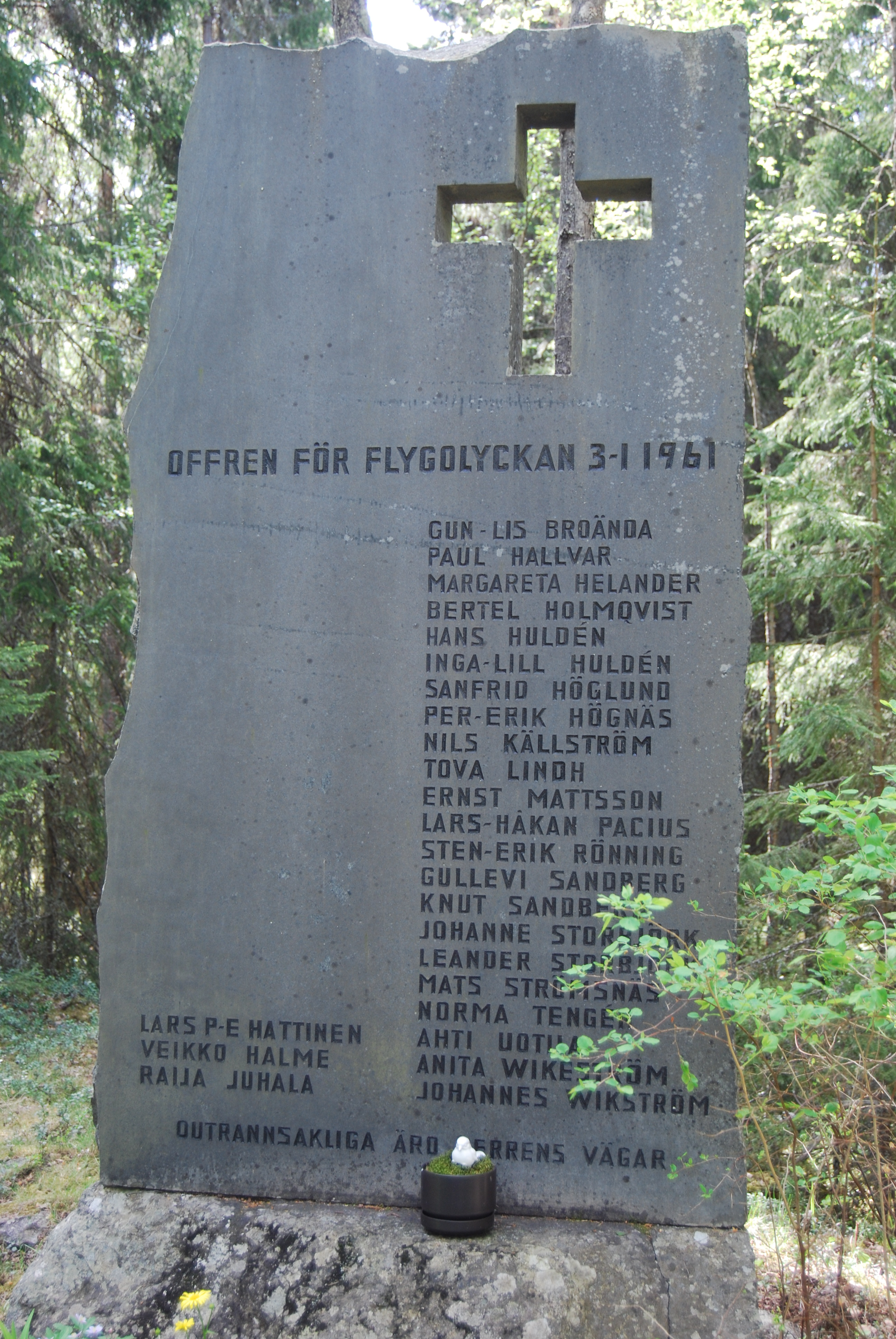
Memorial (in Swedish) to the dead in Kvevlax with the names of the victims

Shortly after the flight's last radio contact with air traffic control, in which the pilots confirmed the weather report and said that they would be at the Seppä non-directional radio beacon in a few minutes, Flight 311 was starting to prepare for landing by descending below 50 metres (160 ft). Suddenly, the plane turned abruptly to the left. This slowed the plane and disrupted airflow significantly. The pilots tried to correct the situation by applying full throttle, but this did not help and the plane went into a spin. The last thing seen by eyewitnesses on the ground was that the pilots had turned the landing lights on before the plane crashed into the woods at 07:40:30 in a steep 70-degree turn.

First responders, reaching the crash site ten minutes after the crash, were unable to rescue anyone due to intense flames which reached over 15 metres (49 ft) in height. The aircraft was extensively destroyed by impact forces and the fire.

== Investigation ==
Officials from Finland's Accident Investigation Board (AIB) concluded that OH-LCC had been airworthy. No evidence was found of any technical malfunction, of the plane hitting trees or of an explosion. It was possible that the plane's controls had been frozen, as it was a cold winter day. The investigation report concluded that this was unlikely in the flying conditions, and an intact wing that had separated from the main wreckage did not have any ice on it. The pilots had not reported any icing on the plane via radio either. The probable cause of the accident was determined to be pilot error when making a left turn. It is possible that one passenger might have been present in the cockpit based on his body location.

According to the report by the AIB, neither the pilot, Captain Lars Hattinen, nor the co-pilot, First Officer Veikko Halme, was in a fit state to fly. They had not slept well the previous night and had been drinking heavily. Autopsies revealed that Hattinen had a blood alcohol content of 0.20 (2 ‰), while Halme had 0.156 (1.56 ‰). In all, Hattinen, Halme, and the possible cockpit visitor had drunk sixteen bottles of beer, seven gin grogs, and 900 grams of cognac from 21:50 to 02:00. Hattinen had thus neglected his responsibility for the plane's and passengers' safety, and neither he nor Halme was in any condition to pilot the plane on the day of the accident.

Both the International Civil Aviation Organization's treaty and the pilots' personal job contracts barred intoxication while in command of a plane—provisions that Hattinen and Halme ignored. In the police interrogation, no one working at Kronoby Airport said they had noticed that the pilots were intoxicated. Only a construction worker, whose brother was one of the victims, said he had noted the possibility based on their behavior but could not have been certain.

== Flight number ==
Although airlines often retire the flight numbers of flights involved in fatal accidents, the successor to Aero O/Y, Finnair, continued to use flight number AY311 on its Helsinki–Vaasa route for some time. The flight number was eventually changed to AY313. The flights are operated mainly with Embraer 190 or ATR 72, but some busy Monday and Friday flights are operated by Airbus A320 family aircraft. As of 2024, the number was again used on the same route.

== See also ==
- Aero Flight 217, Aero O/Y's other fatal DC-3 accident in 1963
- JAL Cargo Flight 1045, a fatal DC-8 accident in 1977 where the captain was intoxicated
- Aeroflot Flight 821, an accident where an intoxicated captain failed to correct a first officer that was challenged by flying with asymmetrical thrust.
- Trans-Colorado Airlines Flight 2286, an accident where a captain intoxicated by cocaine chose a challenging descent to Durango Airport while failing to correct a first officer who was overwhelmed by the challenging approach.
