= Smartavia =

Airline of Russia

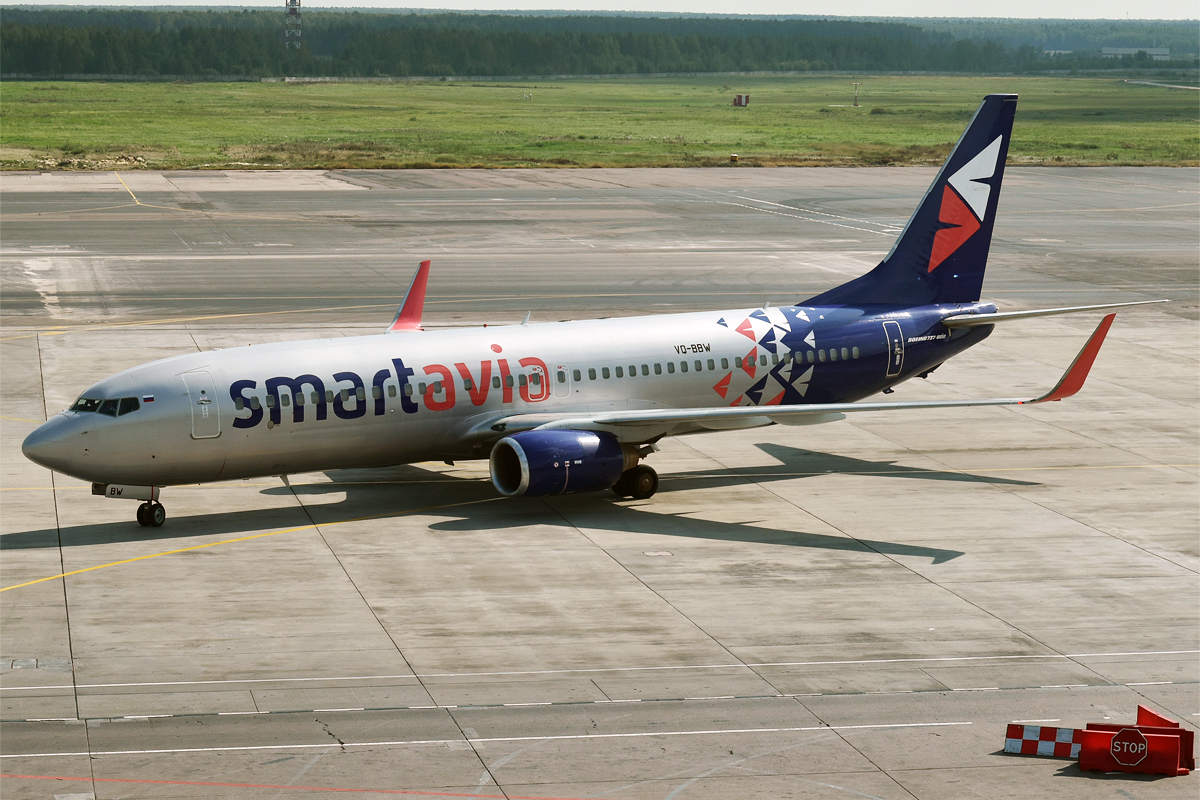
IATA	ICAO	Call sign
5N	AUL	ARCHANGELSK AIR
- Founded: 1963 (as a squadron) 1991 (as an independent airline) 2019 (as Smartavia)
- Hubs: Arkhangelsk; Moscow–Sheremetyevo; Saint Petersburg
- Fleet size: 12
- Destinations: 50
- Parent company: Sky Invest
- Headquarters: Arkhangelsk, Russian Federation
- Website: flysmartavia.com

Smartavia, formerly known as Aeroflot Nord (until December 2009), and Nordavia (until March 2019), is a Russian low-cost airline with its head office in Arkhangelsk, Russia. It mainly operates scheduled domestic and regional services. Its main bases are Arkhangelsk Airport, Pulkovo Airport (Saint Petersburg), and Sheremetyevo International Airport, serving Moscow. Smartavia is a joint-stock company.

As of February 2025, it is on the List of airlines banned in the European Union.

== History ==
Aeroflot-Nord logo, 2004-2009

Nordavia logo, 2009–2019

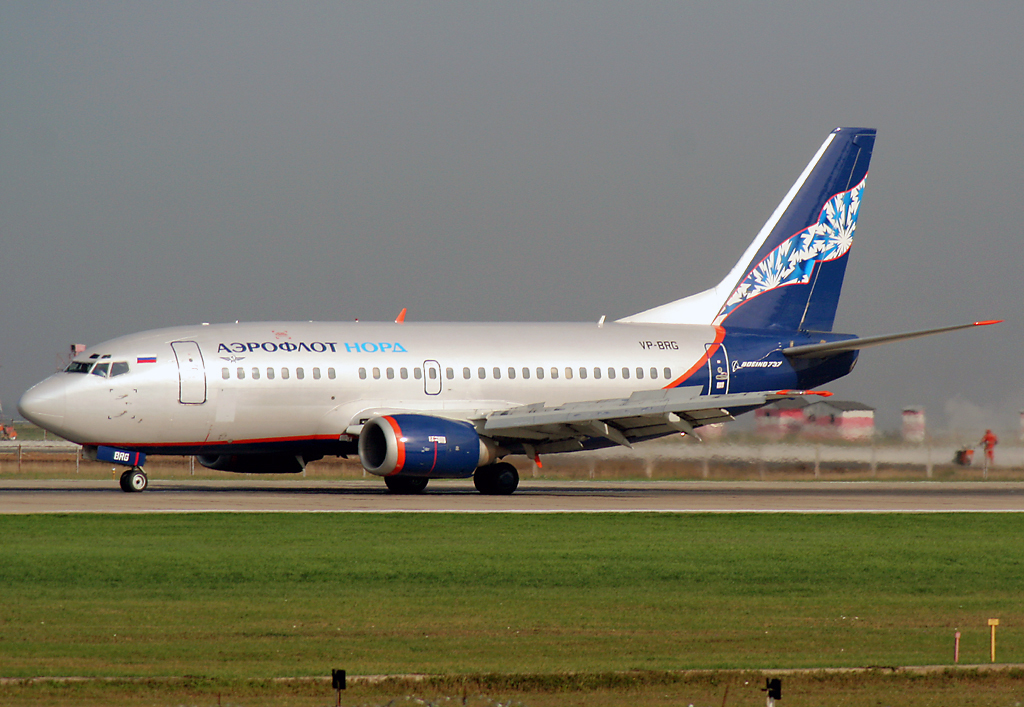
Smartavia Boeing 737-500 in the former livery, operated by the former brand Aeroflot-Nord

The airline was formed in 1963 as Arkhangelsk United Aviation Squadron (Russian: Архангельский объединенный авиационный отряд) and became AVL Arkhangelsk Airlines (Архангельские воздушные линии) in 1991.

=== Under Aeroflot ===
In August 2004, Aeroflot acquired 51% of the airline, with the rest being held by Aviainvest. The company was renamed Aeroflot-Nord, becoming Aeroflot's second regional airline.

When the contract with Aeroflot ended on 1 December 2009, the airline operated independently as Nordavia. Because of the bad press the subsidiary received following the Aeroflot Nord Flight 821 disaster, and Russian aviation officials' 15 July 2009 imposition of restrictions (including a ban on international charter tours) on then Aeroflot-Nord flight operations due to insufficient security and bad finances, Aeroflot distanced itself from Nordavia.

=== Partnership with NordStar ===
In June 2011, Aeroflot sold the airline to Norilsk Nickel for a US$235 million, reduced to net $7 million, due to assumption of company's debt. On December 1, 2011, Norilsk Nickel reported that Nordavia was to be merged in Taimyr Air Company. However, the Federal Antimonopoly Service blocked the merger of Nordavia with Taimyr Air Company, and Nordavia was ultimately sold to Sergey Kuznetsov, the owner of Red Wings Airlines, in March 2016.

=== Partnership with Red Wings Airlines ===
To increase business power, Red Wings Airlines and Nordavia decided to merge. In April 2017, under Red Wings' ownership, it was announced that the airline would change its name to Smartavia from Q3 2017. In addition to the new brand, the airline planned to also introduce a new livery, still in Nordavia's colors (blue, orange, gray) but with a design that moves away from its Aeroflot ancestry. The new branding was planned to debut on the airline's Airbus A320-200 aircraft, however these aircraft were instead delivered to Red Wings after the airline decided to continue using its Boeing 737 aircraft, accepting its first Boeing 737-700 in May 2018, by then still retaining its Nordavia name and brand identity. On 20 March 2019, it was announced that the merging of Nordavia with Red Wings airlines was canceled.

=== Restructuring to Smartavia ===
Following the cancellation, the airline was re-branded to Smartavia. The first aircraft of the new livery arrived in April 2019, with all existing getting replaced by the end of the year. By 2021, the airline had retired all of its Boeing 737-500s, and in April 2021, the airline began their replacement with new Airbus A320neos, officially completing the re-branding into Smartavia and announcing itself as a low-cost carrier.

On 28 May 2021, during a press conference held in Kaliningrad, with the presentation of new Airbus A320neos previously operated by Mexican carrier Interjet, the airline announced a massive order expansion of 40 new Airbus aircraft and plans to phase out all Boeing 737 aircraft by 2023 and only operate Airbus aircraft from then on. If the plan were to succeed, the airline was to purchase Airbus A321neos by 2024.

On 16 September 2021, the airline announced its base expansion plans: by spring 2022, the airline planned to open its new hub at Moscow-Sheremetyevo, as well as to open bases in Kaliningrad, Murmansk, Samara and Sochi.

== Destinations ==
=== Codeshare agreements ===
Smartavia Airlines has codeshare agreements with the following airline:

- Red Wings Airlines

== Fleet ==
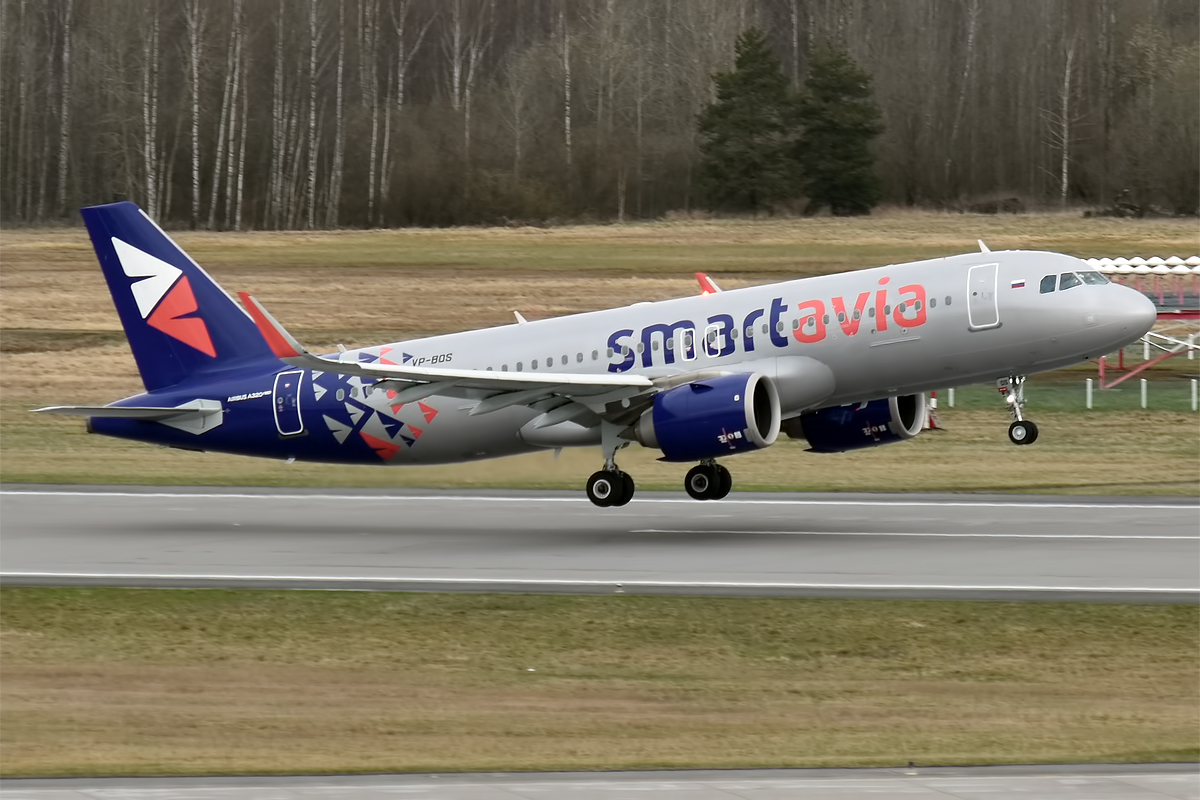
Smartavia Airbus A320neo

As of August 2025, Smartavia operates the following aircraft:

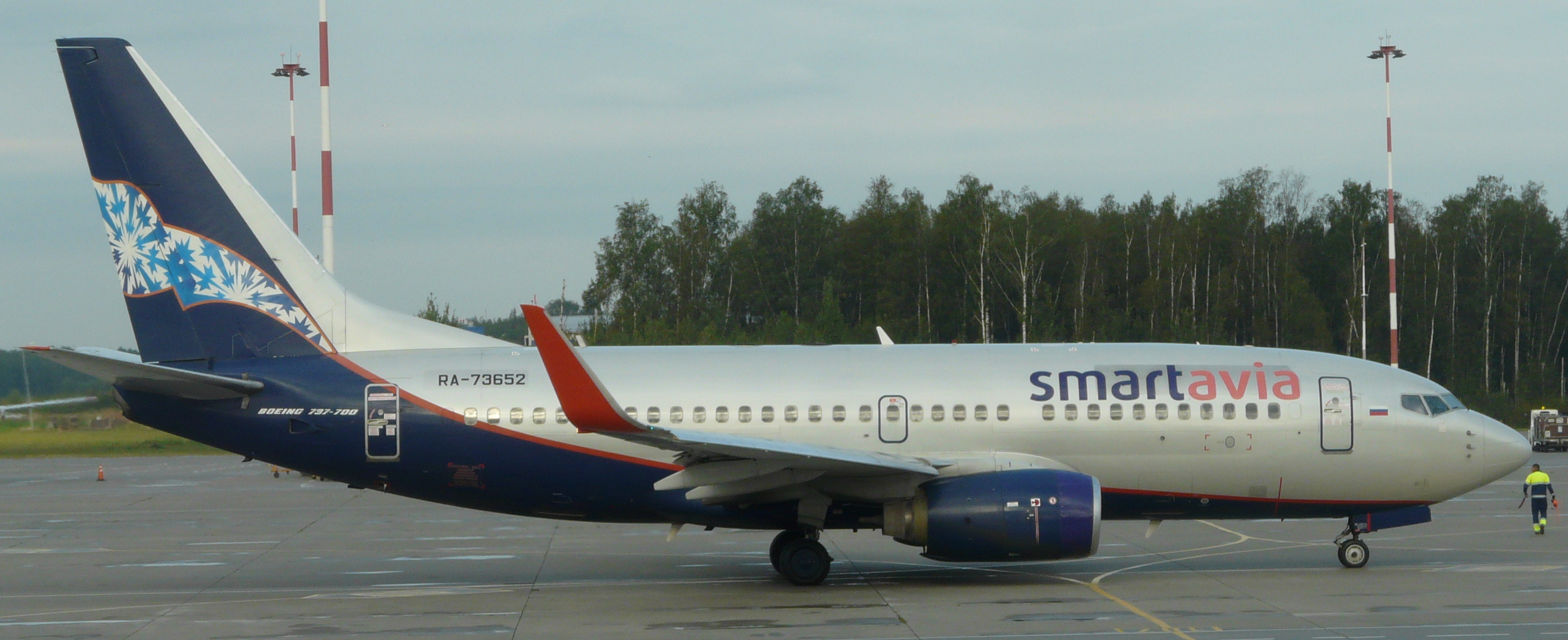
Boeing 737-700 Smartavia at Pulkovo Airport

Smartavia fleet
Aircraft	In service	Orders	Passengers			Notes
Aircraft	In service	Orders	J	Y	Total	Notes
Airbus A320neo	2	—	—	180	180	
Boeing 737-700	2	—	—	142	142	
Boeing 737-800	8	—	—	189	189	The first aircraft to wear SmartAvia livery.
Total	12	—				

=== Historical fleet ===
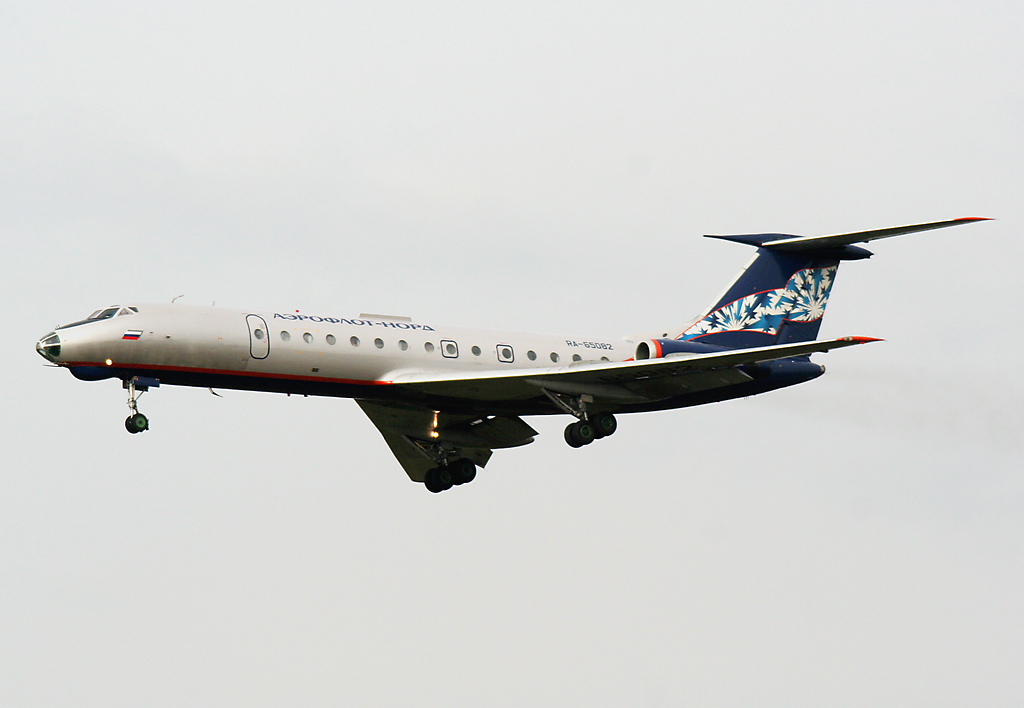
Aeroflot-Nord Tupolev Tu-134A

Smartavia has previously operated the following aircraft:

Smartavia historical fleet
Aircraft	Introduced	Retired	Notes
Antonov An-24	1991	2008	
Boeing 737-300	2008	2012	Was transferred to NordStar in 2012.
Boeing 737-500	2006	2020	Replaced by first Airbus A320neo order, one crashed as Flight 821.
Tupolev Tu-134A	1991	2008	Replaced by Boeing 737-500.
Tupolev Tu-154B-2	1991	2009	Replaced by Boeing 737-500.

== Accidents and incidents ==
- On 14 September 2008, Aeroflot Flight 821, flown under a combined service agreement with Aeroflot, crashed on approach to Perm Airport, Russia. All 88 people on board, including six crew members, were killed.
