= Trans-Colorado Airlines Flight 2286 =

1988 aviation accident in Colorado

Trans-Central Airlines Flight 2286
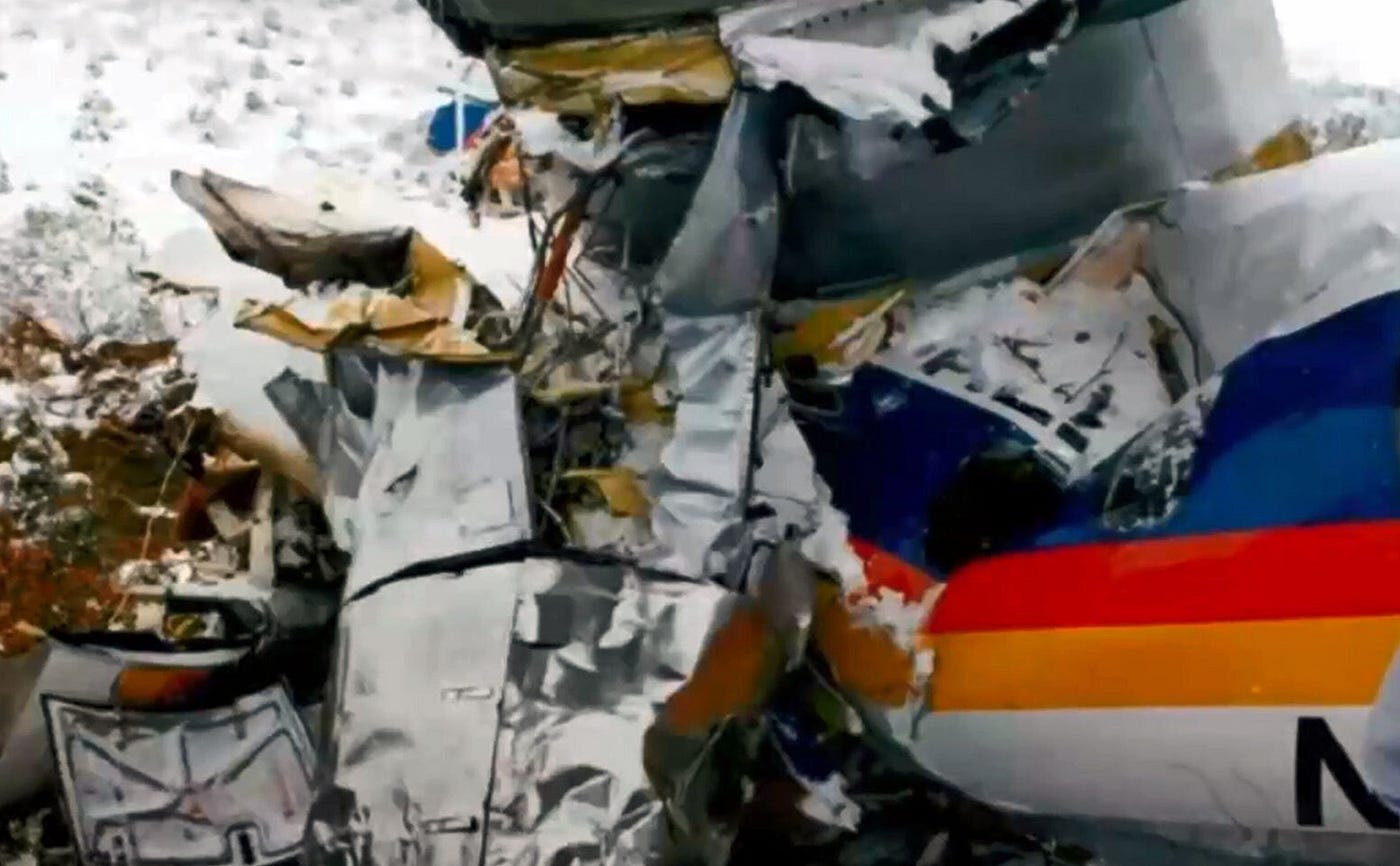
- A close-up view of the aircraft wreckage

Accident
- Date: January 19, 1988
- Summary: Pilot error aggravated by cocaine use, leading to controlled flight into terrain
- Site: Bayfield, Colorado, U.S.; 37°13′N 107°41′W

Aircraft
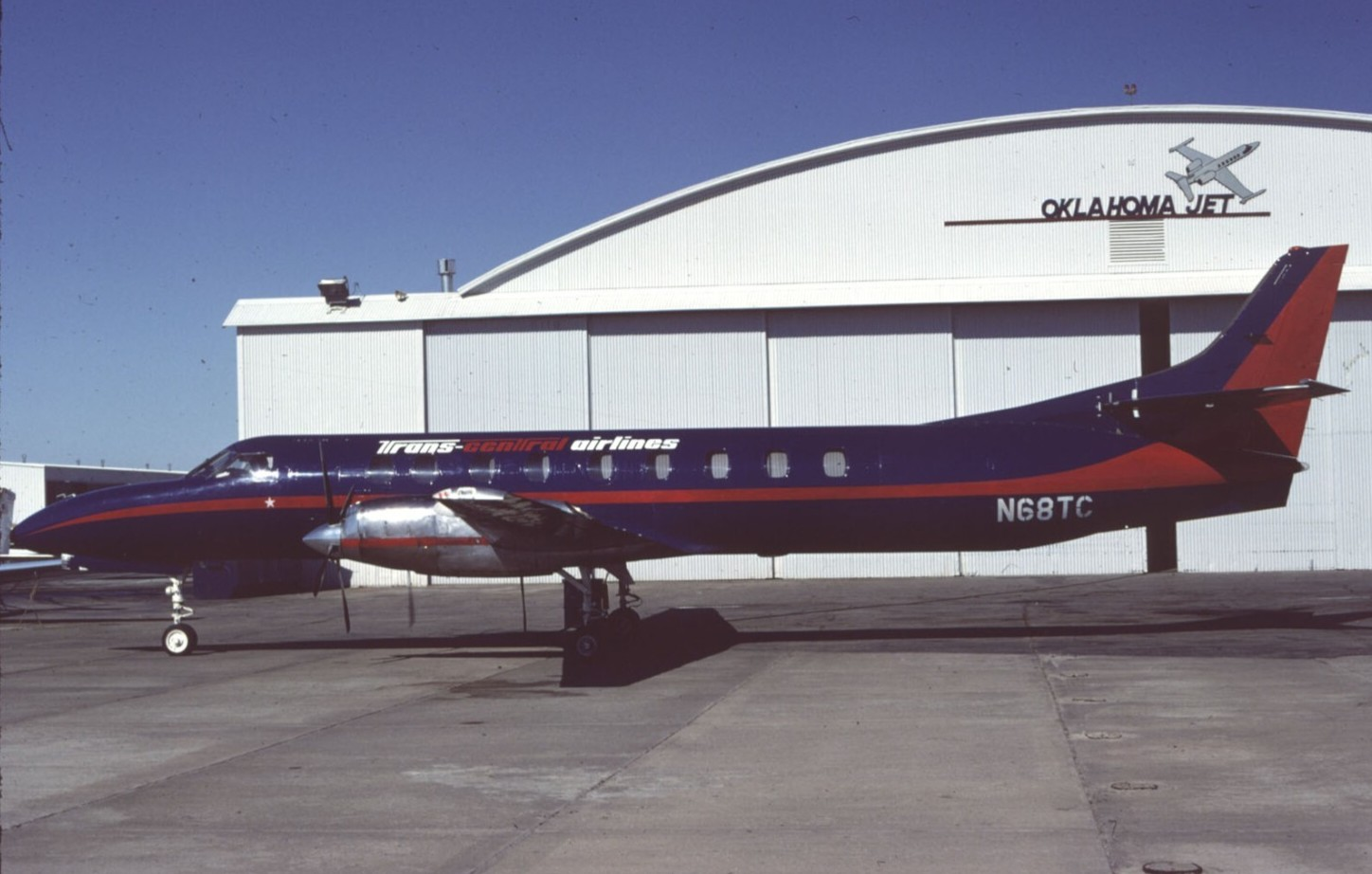
- N68TC, the aircraft involved in the accident, while still in service with Trans-Central Airlines in 1982
- Aircraft type: Fairchild Metro III
- Operator: Trans-Colorado Airlines on behalf of Continental Express
- ICAO flight No.: TCE2286
- Call sign: TRANS COLORADO 2286
- Registration: N68TC
- Flight origin: Denver-Stapleton International Airport; Denver, Colorado, United States
- Destination: Durango–La Plata County Airport; Durango, Colorado, United States
- Occupants: 17
- Passengers: 15
- Crew: 2
- Fatalities: 9
- Injuries: 7
- Survivors: 8

Trans-Colorado Airlines Flight 2286 was a scheduled domestic passenger flight from Denver, Colorado, United States, to Durango, Colorado, United States, operated for Continental Express by Trans-Colorado Airlines. On January 19, 1988, the Swearingen Metroliner crashed onto terrain near Bayfield, Colorado, while on approach to Durango-La Plata County Airport. Out of the 17 people on board, 9 were killed, including both crew members.

The National Transportation Safety Board (NTSB) investigation determined the most probable cause of the accident was the crew's failure to follow the proper descent profile, and that recent cocaine use by the captain was a contributing factor.

== Background ==
=== Aircraft ===
On the date of the accident, Trans-Colorado Airlines Flight 2286 was operated using a Fairchild Metro III twin-turboprop aircraft (registered as N68TC). Initially manufactured in 1981, this particular aircraft was acquired by Trans-Colorado in 1986. The Metro III had logged a total of approximately 12,000 flight hours at the time of the accident.

=== Crew ===
The flight was crewed by Captain Stephen S. Silver (36) and First Officer Ralph D. Harvey (42), who joined Trans-Colorado in 1986 and 1987, respectively. Silver had logged 4,184 hours of flight experience, including 3,028 hours on the Fairchild Metro. Harvey had 8,500 flight hours, with 3,458 of them on the Fairchild Metro.

== Accident ==
Flight 2286 departed Denver's Stapleton International Airport at 18:20 Mountain Standard Time as a regularly scheduled flight to Durango–La Plata County Airport. A total of fifteen passengers and two pilots were on board.

At 18:53, Flight 2286 reported reaching its cruising altitude of 23,000 feet. Air traffic control advised Flight 2286 of reduced visibility into Durango, with a ceiling of only 800 feet and light snow and fog in the area. At 19:00, controllers asked Flight 2286 whether they wanted to make an Instrument Landing System (ILS) approach to Durango's Runway 2, or a non-precision approach to Durango's Runway 20. From Flight 2286's location, the ILS landing would have required backtracking to make the approach to Runway 2, adding ten minutes to the flight versus a more direct approach into Runway 20. Silver, who had a reputation as a pilot who could make up for lost time, chose the approach to Runway 20 because it would save time. He allowed Harvey to fly the approach into Durango.

At 19:03, Flight 2286 was cleared to begin descending from 23,000 feet. In order to make a direct approach into Durango, Harvey flew in at a rapid descent of 3,000 feet per minute, which was more than three times the rate intended for the approach. At 19:14, Flight 2286 received clearance to approach Runway 20, and reported reaching 14,000 feet. The aircraft continued to descend until it struck the ground, and then pitched up. The aircraft rolled several times before striking the ground again. Flight 2286 eventually slid to a stop approximately five miles from the airport.

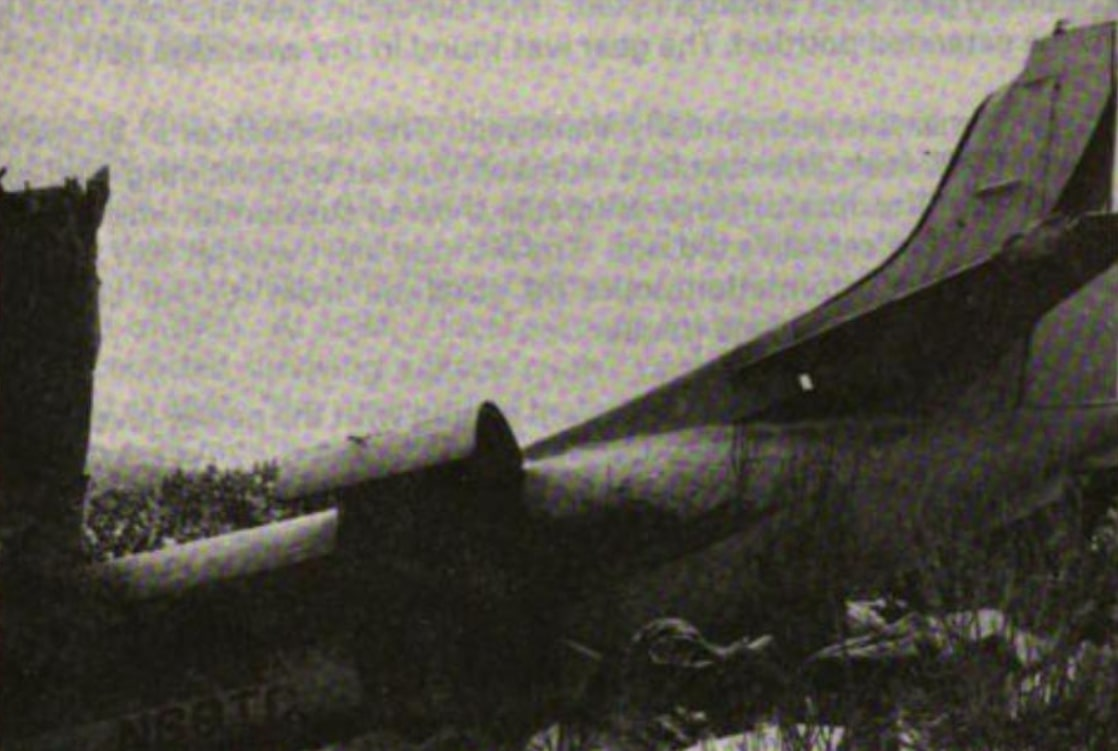
A photograph of the tail section of the aircraft, still somewhat intact after the crash

A surviving passenger of Flight 2286 walked away from the crash site and went to a nearby house. At 20:34, the homeowner contacted Central Dispatch to inform them of the plane crash survivor. Central Dispatch sent a rescue vehicle to retrieve the survivor and it arrived at 20:45. Five other survivors, including a 23-month-old baby carried by another survivor, walked together about 1.5 miles over 1.5 hours to a highway. They saw and met a motorist who transported them about a mile until he met a responding rescue vehicle. The survivors were then transported to a local hospital. Of the seventeen people on board, seven passengers and both pilots were killed.

== Investigation and probable cause ==
Investigators from the National Transportation Safety Board (NTSB) learned that Harvey had a history of alcohol abuse. However, he had completed a physical exam the day before the crash and was found at that time to be free of alcohol or illegal drugs. In addition, tests on Harvey's body were negative for alcohol or drugs. However, the NTSB was soon approached by another pilot who had encountered a woman claiming to be Silver's fiancée. The woman claimed to have "done a bag of cocaine" with Silver the night before the accident. The NTSB attempted to contact and interview the woman, but were unsuccessful. Tests on Silver's body found traces of cocaine and its metabolites in his blood and urine. The NTSB concluded that Silver had likely used cocaine twelve to eighteen hours before the accident, and that his piloting skills were likely degraded as a result of his drug use.

On February 4, 1989, the NTSB issued its final report on Flight 2286, in which it stated its finding of the probable cause of the crash:

The National Transportation Safety Board determines that the probable cause of this accident was the first officer's flying and the captain's ineffective monitoring of an unstabilized approach which resulted in a descent below the published descent profile. Contributing to the accident was the degradation of the captain's performance resulting from his use of cocaine before the accident.

The aircraft was not equipped with a cockpit voice recorder or flight data recorder, as the Federal Aviation Administration (FAA) did not require such small regional aircraft to be equipped with such recorders at the time. After the accident, the FAA mandated the installation of flight recorders in all aircraft operating scheduled flights.

== In popular culture ==
The accident and subsequent investigation are the subject of a season 16 episode of the documentary television series Mayday, titled "Dangerous Approach", first broadcast in July 2016.

== See also ==
- Aero Flight 311, a fatal DC-3 accident in 1961 in which both pilots were intoxicated.
- Japan Air Lines Cargo Flight 1045, a fatal DC-8 accident in 1977 where the captain was intoxicated.
- Aeroflot Flight 821, an accident where an intoxicated captain failed to correct a first officer who was challenged by flying with asymmetrical thrust.
