= Lars Hattinen =

Finnish flying ace

- Born: 16 May 1923; Kuorevesi, Finland
- Died: 3 January 1961 (aged 37); Kvevlax, Finland
- Cause of death: Plane crash
- Occupation: Pilot
- Years active: 1944–1961
- Employer: Aero O/Y
- Known for: Youngest Finnish WWII flying ace, Aero Flight 311

Lars Paul-Erich "Lasse" Hattinen (16 May 1923 – 3 January 1961) was a Finnish World War II flying ace and a commercial airliner pilot. At the time, he was the youngest flying ace and he achieved 6 air victories with the Morane-Saulnier M.S.406 between 25 June and 30 July 1944. Hattinen is recognized as the only pilot who flew the Mörkö Morane, the plane's version developed in Finland. His three victories flying this plane were the only kills scored by the fighter. He had four regular victories flying Morane planes when he achieved his first Yak-1 victory in 1944. On his last flight, his plane caught fire, and he only barely survived with burns.

After the war, he worked as an airliner pilot for the Finnish flag carrier Aero O/Y. He was the pilot of the ill-fated Aero Flight 311 which crashed in Kvevlax in January 1961. The investigation revealed that Hattinen and his co-pilot, neither of whom survived the crash, had been drinking heavily the night before the flight.

== Legacy ==
The author Seppo Porvali wrote a biography about Hattinen titled Last Ace.
