= Storage Networking World =

Storage Networking World (SNW) is a conference for data storage professionals in the United States. Sponsored by Computerworld and the Storage Networking Industry Association, SNW was held twice each year. Common locations include Orlando, Florida, Grapevine, Texas, Phoenix, Arizona and San Diego, California. The event is oriented towards manufacturers and consumers of enterprise storage equipment and software, and is often the site of product launches and announcements. These events started in the fall of 1999, and the last event was held in the fall of 2013. The event dates and locations are listed below:

SNW Event Dates and Locations
Year	Season	Dates	Location
1999	Fall	Oct 19-21	Renaissance Madison, Seattle, Washington
2000	Spring	April 17–19	Marriott Desert, Palm Desert, California
2000	Fall	Oct 30-Nov 1	Renaissance Orlando Resort and Conference Center, Orlando, Florida
2001	Spring	April 9–11	Marriott Desert, Palm Desert, California
2001	Fall	Oct 22-24	Renaissance Orlando Resort and Conference Center, Orlando, Florida
2002	Spring	April 3–5	Marriott Desert, Palm Desert, California
2002	Fall	Oct 27-30	Renaissance Orlando Resort and Conference Center, Orlando, Florida
2003	Spring	April 14–17	JW Marriott Desert Ridge Resort, Phoenix, Arizona
2003	Fall	Oct 27-30	Renaissance Orlando Resort and Conference Center, Orlando, Florida
2004	Spring	April 5–8	JW Mariott Desert Ridge Resort, Phoenix, Arizona
2004	Fall	Oct 25-28	Renaissance Orlando Resort and Conference Center, Orlando, Florida
2005	Spring	April 12–15	JW Marriott Desert Ridge Resort, Phoenix, Arizona
2005	Fall	Oct 24-27	JW Mariott Grande Lakes Resort, Orlando, Florida
2006	Spring	April 3–6	Manchester Grand Hyatt, San Diego, California
2006	Fall	Oct 31-Nov 3	JW Mariott Grande Lakes Resort, Orlando, Florida
2007	Spring	April 16–19	Manchester Grand Hyatt, San Diego, California
2007	Fall	Oct 15-18	Gaylord Texan Resort and Convention Center, Dallas, Texas
2008	Spring	April 7–10	Rosen Shingle Creek, Orlando, Florida
2008	Fall	Oct 13-16	Gaylord Texan Resort and Convention Center, Dallas, Texas
2009	Spring	April 6–9	Rosen Shingle Creek, Orlando, Florida
2009	Fall	Oct 12-15	JW Marriott Desert Ridge Resort, Phoenix, Arizona
2010	Spring	April 12–15	Rosen Shingle Creek, Orlando, Florida
2010	Fall	Oct 11-13	Gaylord Texan Resort and Convention Center, Dallas, Texas
2011	Spring	April 4–7	Hyatt Regency Silicon Valley Santa Clara Convention Center, Santa Clara, California
2011	Fall	Oct 10-13	JW Marriott Grande Lakes, Orlando, Florida
2012	Spring	April 2–5	Omni Hotel, Dallas, Texas
2012	Fall	Oct 16-19	Hyatt Regency Silicon Valley Santa Clara Convention Center, Santa Clara, California
2013	Spring	April 2–5	Rosen Shingle Creek, Orlando, Florida
2013	Fall	Oct 14-17	Long Beach Convention Center, California

The corresponding conference in Europe is called SNW Europe and commonly occurs in Frankfurt, Germany. Additional conferences were held in China, Japan, and Australia.

SNW Europe Events
Year	Dates	Location
2001	Sept 9-12th	Seville, Spain
2003	June 4	Cannes, France
2004	Sept 7-8th	Frankfurt, Germany
2005	Sept 6-7th	Frankfurt, Germany
2006	Sept 5-6th	Frankfurt, Germany
2007	Oct 30th	Frankfurt, Germany
2008	Oct 27th	Frankfurt, Germany
2009	Oct 27th	Frankfurt, Germany
2010	Oct 26-27th	Frankfurt, Germany
