= Sun West Airlines =

American airline

IATA	ICAO	Call sign
-	SNW	—
- Commenced operations: 1980; 46 years ago
- Ceased operations: March 5, 1985; 41 years ago
- Hubs: Phoenix, Arizona
- Secondary hubs: Albuquerque, New Mexico

Sun West Airlines was a commuter airline that flew in the Southwestern United States from 1980 through 1985. Hubs were operated at Phoenix, Arizona and Albuquerque, New Mexico.

== History ==
Sun West Airlines began in early 1980 with Piper Navajo Chieftain's on a Phoenix–Gallup–Farmington–Durango route, a route vacated by the original Frontier Airlines using 50-seat Convair 580's the year prior. Flights from Albuquerque to Gallup and Farmington began by October 26, 1980, and to Durango by mid-1981. Service was expanded from Phoenix to Flagstaff and Yuma the following year as well as a Phoenix–Winslow–Gallup–Albuquerque route. More flights were added on all Albuquerque routes after Frontier exited the markets in late 1981. Sun West provided Essential Air Service for a time at Gallup, New Mexico and Winslow, Arizona. By June 1983, Sun West had introduced the 14-seat Beechcraft 99 airliner but was then faced with intense competition by Air Midwest, Mesa, Pioneer, and Trans-Colorado Airlines on the Albuquerque to Farmington and Durango routes causing the carrier to retreat from these markets the following year. Service from Albuquerque and Phoenix to Tucson was also operated for brief periods in 1983. Sun West began a Phoenix–Prescott–Bullhead City–Las Vegas route on August 1, 1984, and modified it to a Phoenix–Lake Havasu City–Bullhead City–Ontario, California route on March 1, 1985. However, the airline ceased all operations on March 5, 1985.

== Destinations ==
- Bullhead City, Arizona/Laughlin, Nevada
- Flagstaff, Arizona
- Lake Havasu City, Arizona
- Phoenix, Arizona
- Prescott, Arizona
- Tucson, Arizona
- Winslow, Arizona
- Yuma, Arizona
- Albuquerque, New Mexico
- Farmington, New Mexico
- Gallup, New Mexico
- Durango, Colorado
- Las Vegas, Nevada
- Ontario, California

== Fleet ==
- Piper Seneca (3)
- Piper Navajo Chieftain (5)
- Beechcraft 99 (5)

== See also ==
- List of defunct airlines of the United States
