= Bayfield, Colorado =

Statutory town in La Plata County, Colorado, United States

- statutory town
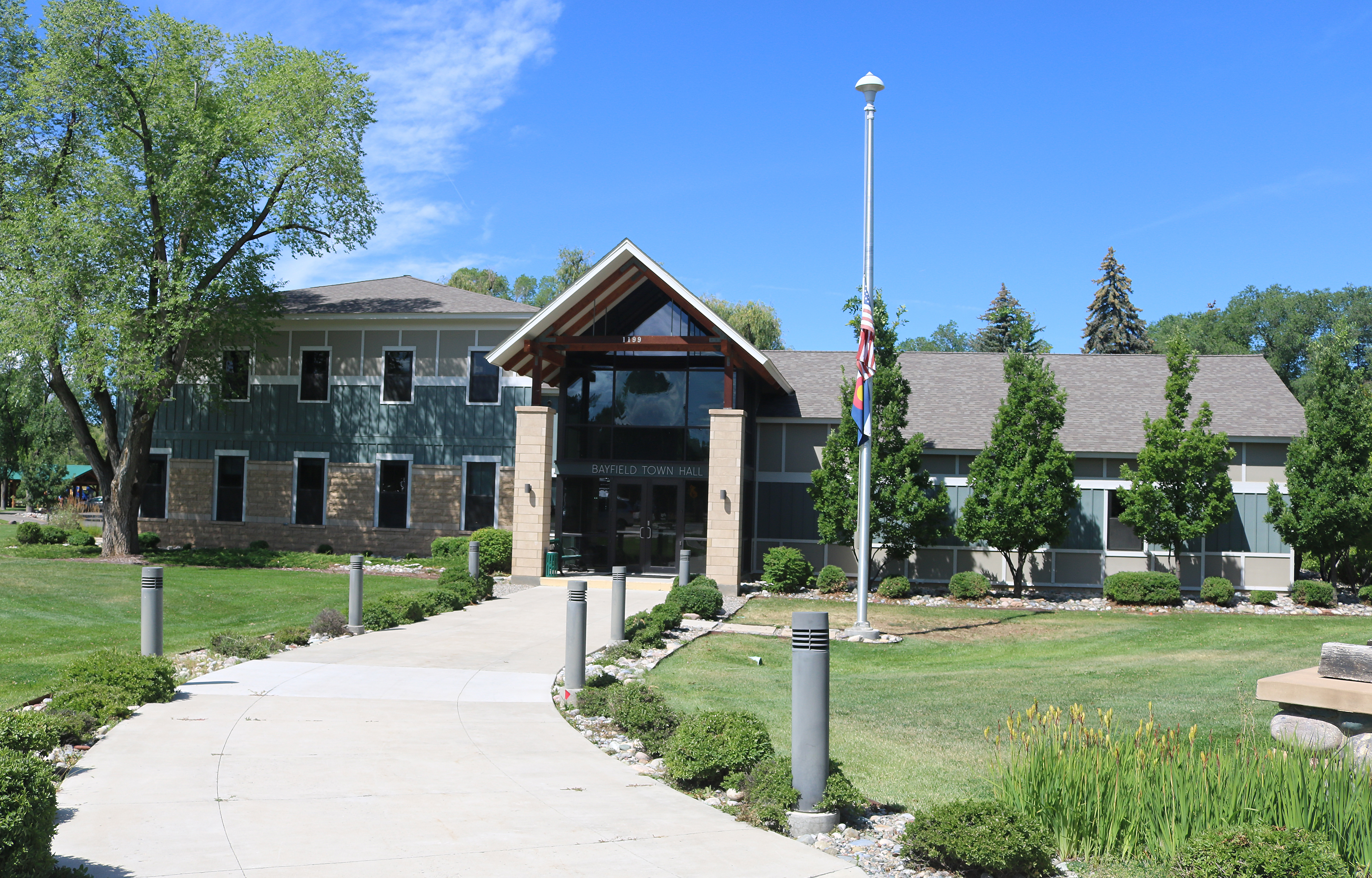
- Bayfield Town Hall

- Location of the Town of Bayfield in La Plata County, Colorado

- Location of Bayfield, Colorado. Bayfield (Colorado)
- Coordinates: 37°14′40″N 107°35′38″W
- Country: United States
- State: Colorado
- County: La Plata
- Incorporated (town): August 18, 1906

Government
  - Type: Statutory town
  - Mayor: Tom Au
  - Town Manager: Katie Sickles

Area
  - statutory town: 1.646 sq mi (4.264 km^{2})
  - Land: 1.646 sq mi (4.264 km^{2})
  - Water: 0 sq mi (0.000 km^{2})
- Elevation: 6,900 ft (2,100 m)

Population (2020)
  - statutory town: 2,838
  - Density: 1,724/sq mi (666/km^{2})
  - Metro: 55,638
- Time zone: UTC−07:00 (MST)
  - Summer (DST): UTC−06:00 (MDT)
- ZIP code: 81122
- Area code: 970
- GNIS town ID: 2411667
- FIPS code: 08-05265
- Website: Town of Bayfield

Bayfield is a statutory town located in La Plata County, Colorado, United States. The town population was 2,838 at the 2020 United States census, a +21.65% increase since the 2010 United States census. Bayfield is part of the Durango, CO Micropolitan Statistical Area.

== History ==
The town derives its name from W.A. Bay, founder. The Bayfield, Colorado, post office opened on February 25, 1899, and the Town of Bayfield was incorporated on August 18, 1906.

On January 19, 1988, Trans-Colorado Airlines Flight 2286 crashed in Bayfield, killing nine of the 17 people aboard.

== Geography ==
Bayfield is located along U.S. Highway 160.

At the 2020 United States census, the town had a total area of 1,054 acres (4.264 km^{2}), all of it land.

== Demographics ==
Historical population
Census	Pop.	Note	%±
1910	227		—
1920	267		17.6%
1930	277		3.7%
1940	372		34.3%
1950	335		−9.9%
1960	322		−3.9%
1970	320		−0.6%
1980	724		126.3%
1990	1,090		50.6%
2000	1,549		42.1%
2010	2,333		50.6%
2020	2,838		21.6%
U.S. Decennial Census

=== 2020 census ===
As of the 2020 census, Bayfield had a population of 2,838. The median age was 35.3 years. 30.3% of residents were under the age of 18 and 13.9% of residents were 65 years of age or older. For every 100 females there were 100.0 males, and for every 100 females age 18 and over there were 95.7 males age 18 and over.

0.0% of residents lived in urban areas, while 100.0% lived in rural areas.

There were 1,049 households in Bayfield, of which 42.9% had children under the age of 18 living in them. Of all households, 49.8% were married-couple households, 17.8% were households with a male householder and no spouse or partner present, and 23.3% were households with a female householder and no spouse or partner present. About 23.6% of all households were made up of individuals and 10.9% had someone living alone who was 65 years of age or older.

There were 1,111 housing units, of which 5.6% were vacant. The homeowner vacancy rate was 1.8% and the rental vacancy rate was 6.3%.

Racial composition as of the 2020 census
Race	Number	Percent
White	2,307	81.3%
Black or African American	12	0.4%
American Indian and Alaska Native	117	4.1%
Asian	11	0.4%
Native Hawaiian and Other Pacific Islander	1	0.0%
Some other race	126	4.4%
Two or more races	264	9.3%
Hispanic or Latino (of any race)	463	16.3%

=== 2000 census ===
As of the census of 2000, there were 1,549 people, 567 households, and 409 families residing in the town. The population density was 1,433.3 inhabitants per square mile (553.4/km^{2}). There were 597 housing units at an average density of 552.4 per square mile (213.3/km^{2}). The racial makeup of the town was 91.67% White, 0.19% African American, 2.13% Native American, 0.13% Asian, 3.36% from other races, and 2.52% from two or more races. Hispanic or Latino of any race were 10.46% of the population.

There were 567 households, out of which 43.2% had children under the age of 18 living with them, 59.3% were married couples living together, 8.6% had a female householder with no husband present, and 27.7% were non-families. 22.8% of all households were made up of individuals, and 6.0% had someone living alone who was 65 years of age or older. The average household size was 2.71 and the average family size was 3.19.

In the town, the population was spread out, with 31.2% under the age of 18, 7.4% from 18 to 24, 30.0% from 25 to 44, 23.8% from 45 to 64, and 7.5% who were 65 years of age or older. The median age was 35 years. For every 100 females, there were 98.3 males. For every 100 females age 18 and over, there were 92.9 males.

The median income for a household in the town was $39,336, and the median income for a family was $46,583. Males had a median income of $34,464 versus $22,027 for females. The per capita income for the town was $17,324. About 2.9% of families and 5.6% of the population were below the poverty line, including 3.8% of those under age 18 and 7.9% of those age 65 or over.

== See also ==
- Durango, CO Micropolitan Statistical Area
- Spring Creek Archeological District
