= Delta Connection =

Regional airline brand of the United States

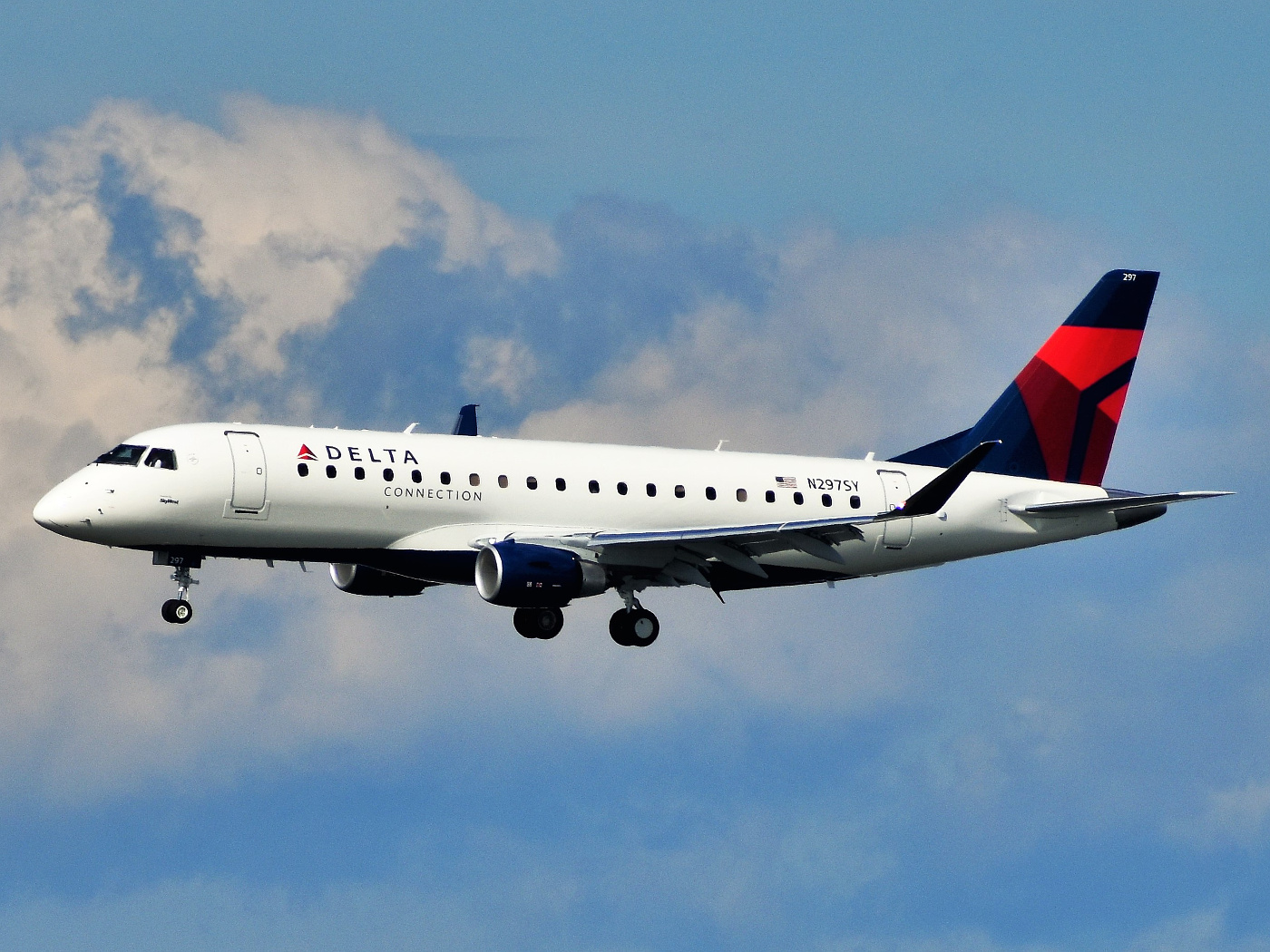
- Embraer E175 operated by SkyWest Airlines
- Founded: 1984; 42 years ago
- Hubs: Atlanta; Boston; Detroit; Los Angeles; Minneapolis/St. Paul; New York–JFK; New York–LaGuardia; Salt Lake City; Seattle/Tacoma
- Focus cities: Austin; Raleigh/Durham
- Frequent-flyer program: SkyMiles
- Alliance: SkyTeam (affiliate)
- Parent company: Delta Air Lines
- Website: www.delta.com

Delta Connection is a brand name under which Delta Air Lines has air service agreements with domestic regional air carriers that feed traffic to their network by serving passengers primarily in small and medium-sized cities in the domestic market, allowing a better match of capacity with demand in these markets. These include Delta's wholly owned subsidiary Endeavor Air and its third-party contractors Republic Airways and SkyWest Airlines.

These agreements are primarily capacity purchase arrangements, where Delta controls scheduling, pricing, reservations, ticketing, and seat inventories for the flights. Delta is entitled to all ticket, cargo, mail, in-flight, and ancillary revenues from these flights, while paying the regional airlines a defined amount based on their operating costs and market rates. These capacity purchase agreements are typically long-term, often lasting at least ten years with an option to extend. Some agreements grant Delta the right to terminate or remove certain aircraft for convenience at specific future dates. Additionally, SkyWest Airlines operates some flights under a revenue proration agreement, which divides the revenue for connecting flight itineraries based on a fixed dollar or percentage division.

A scope clause agreement between Delta Air Lines and its mainline pilots union, the Air Line Pilots Association, limits the number and size of aircraft that may be flown by Delta Connection. The current agreement allows up to 125 airplanes with 50 seats or fewer, 102 airplanes with between 51 and 70 seats, and 223 airplanes with up to 76 seats.

== Airlines and fleet ==
As of February 2025, the combined Delta Connection-branded fleet consists of the following regional jet aircraft:

Airline	Aircraft	In fleet	Orders	Passengers				Notes
Airline	Aircraft	In fleet	Orders	F	Y+	Y	Total	Notes
Endeavor Air	Bombardier CRJ700	19	—	9	16	44	69	
Endeavor Air	Bombardier CRJ900	20	—	12	20	38	70	
Endeavor Air	Bombardier CRJ900	106	—	12	20	44	76	
Republic Airways	Embraer 170	11	—	9	12	48	69	
Republic Airways	Embraer 175	46	—	12	20	44	76	
SkyWest Airlines	Bombardier CRJ550	14	5	10	20	20	50	
SkyWest Airlines	Bombardier CRJ700	5	—	9	16	44	69	
SkyWest Airlines	Bombardier CRJ900	36	—	12	20	38	70	
SkyWest Airlines	Bombardier CRJ900	36	—	12	20	44	76	
SkyWest Airlines	Embraer 175	37	—	12	20	38	70	
SkyWest Airlines	Embraer 175	49	—	12	20	44	76	
Total		339	5					

== History ==
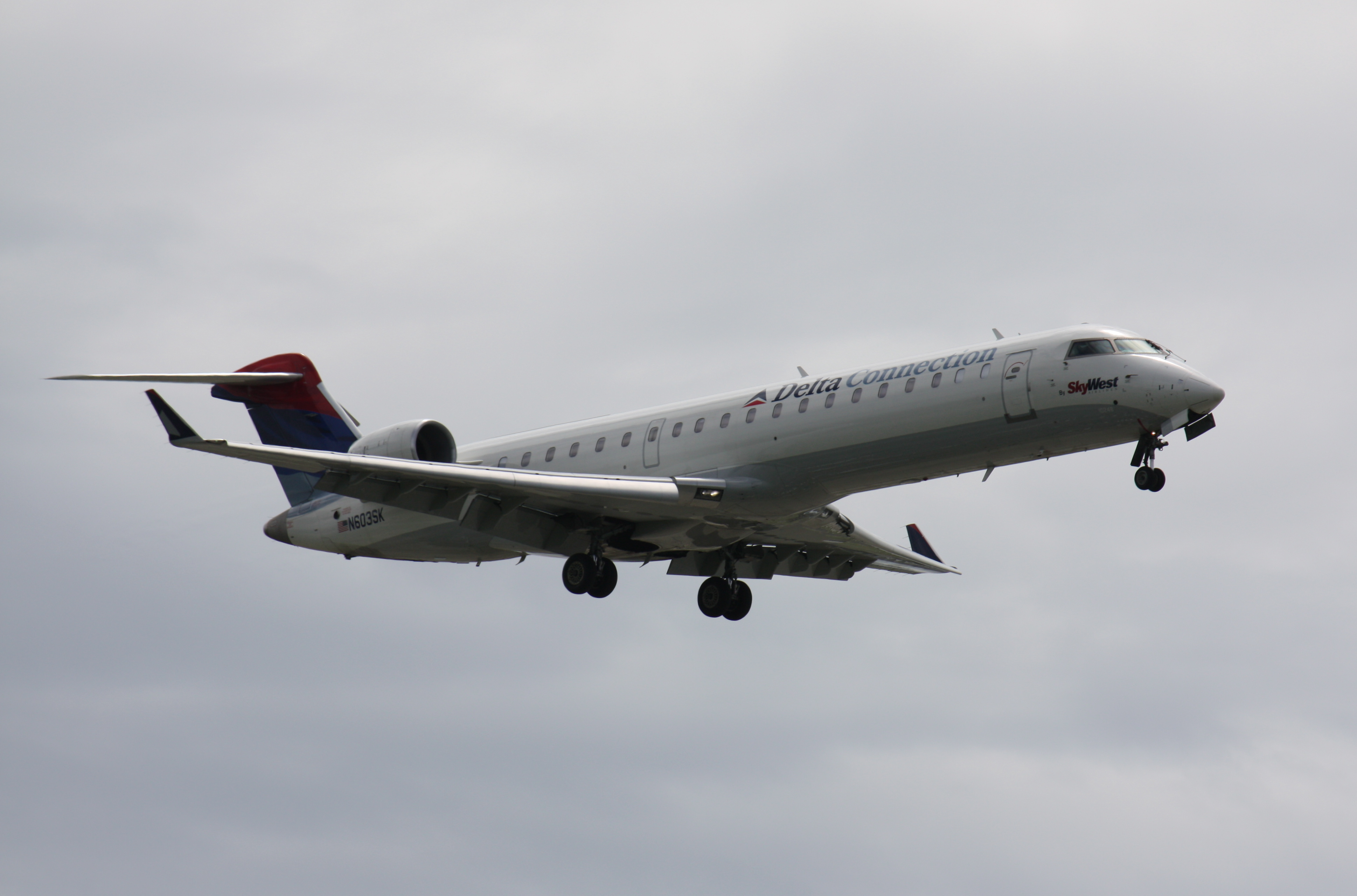
CRJ700, operated by SkyWest, 2008

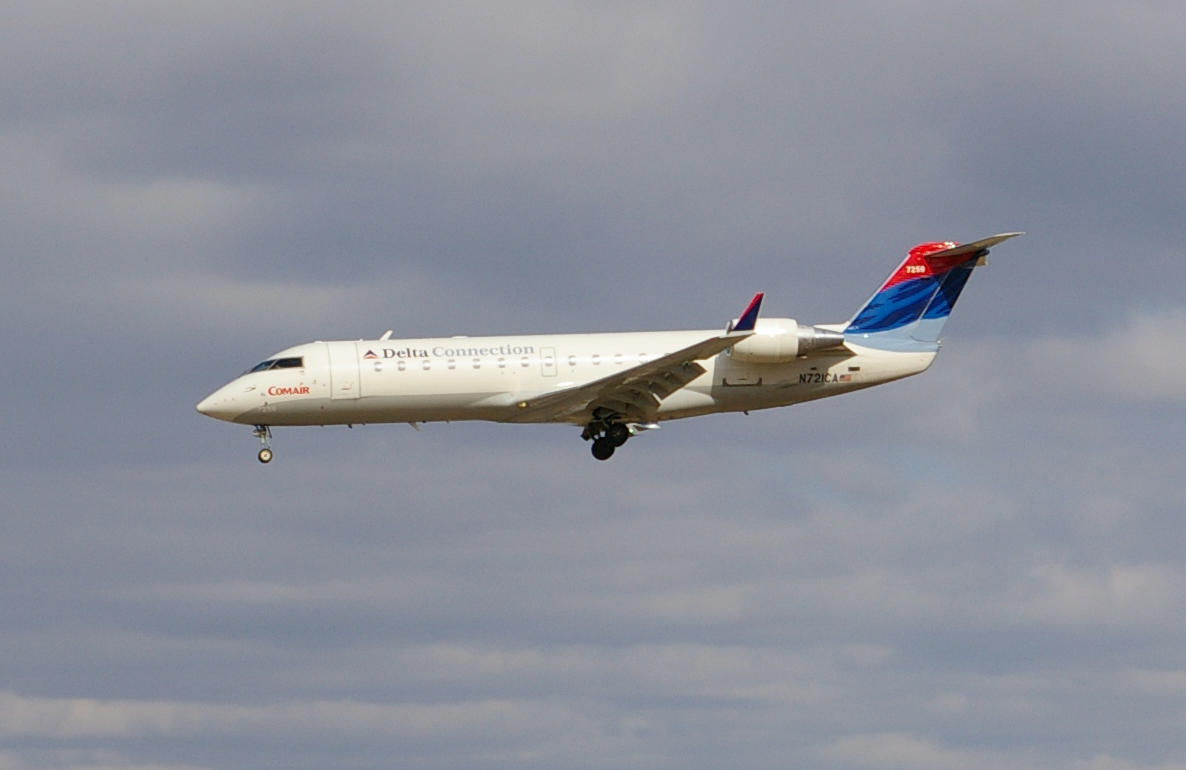
CRJ100, operated by Comair

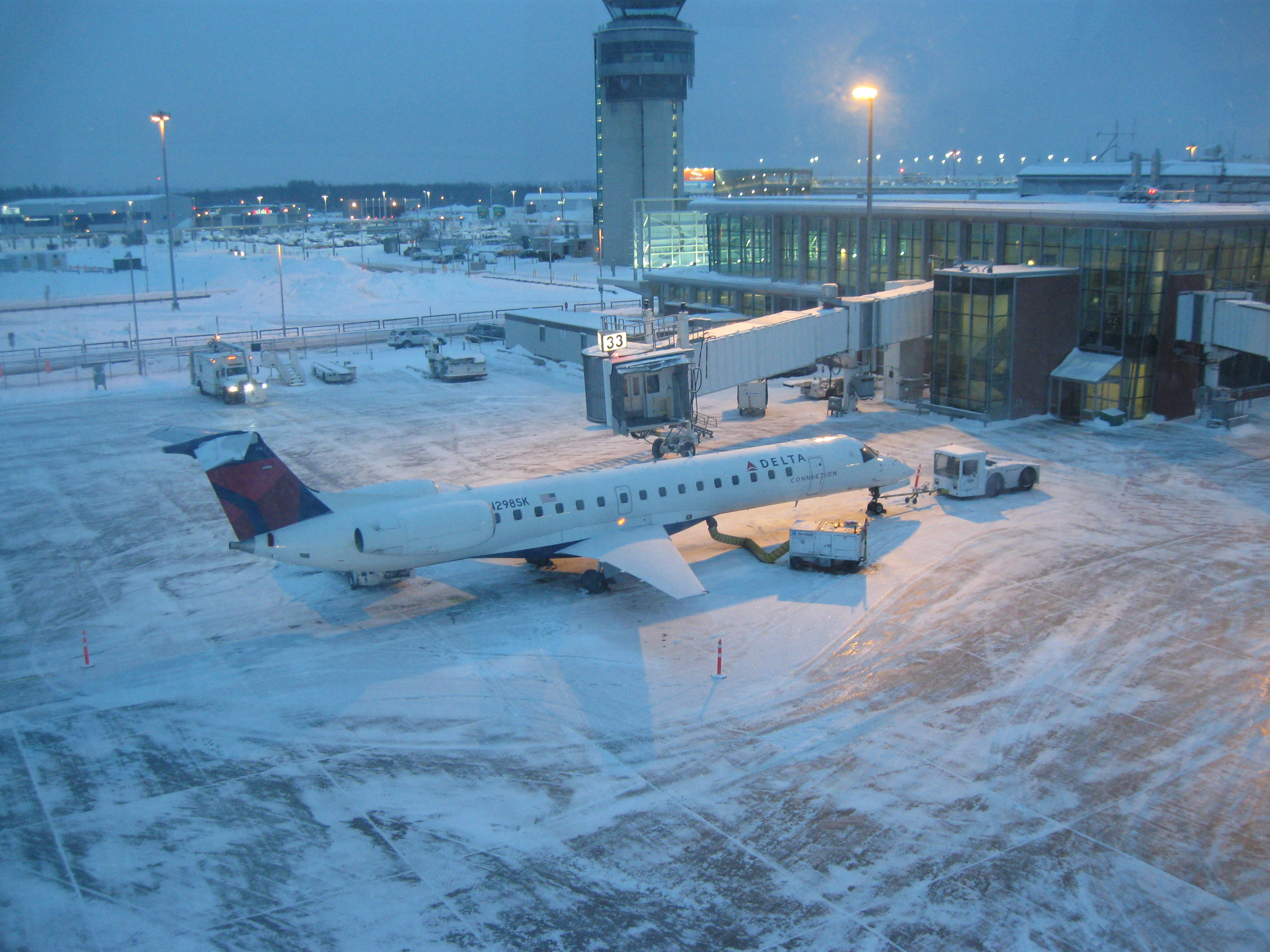
ERJ 145, seen during winter at Québec City Jean Lesage International Airport, was operated by several partner airlines

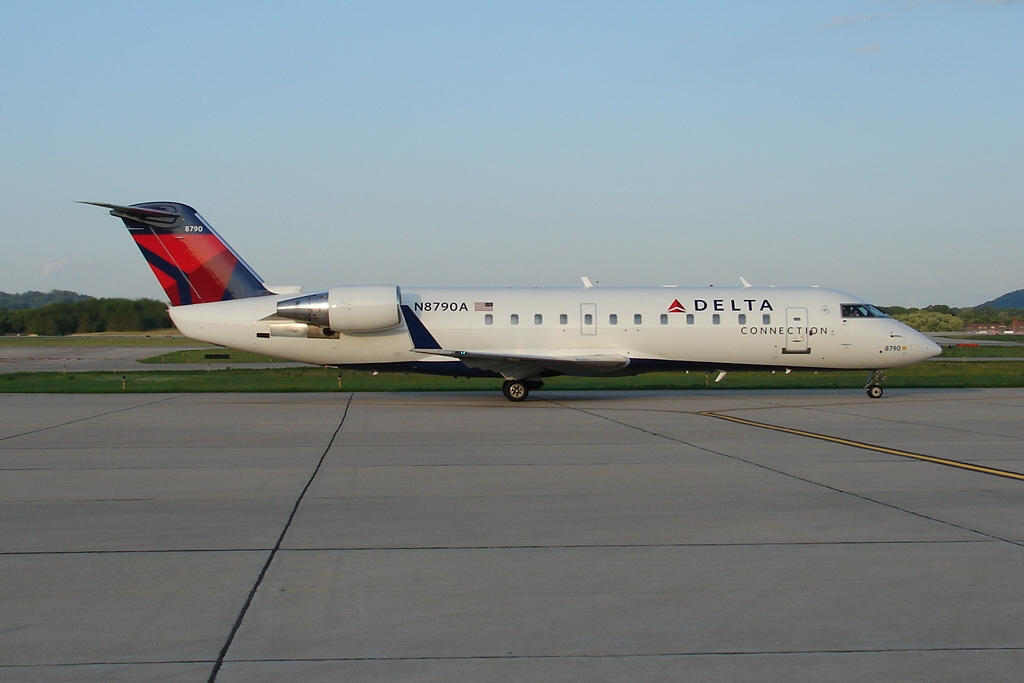
Canadair CRJ-200 was operated by several partner airlines

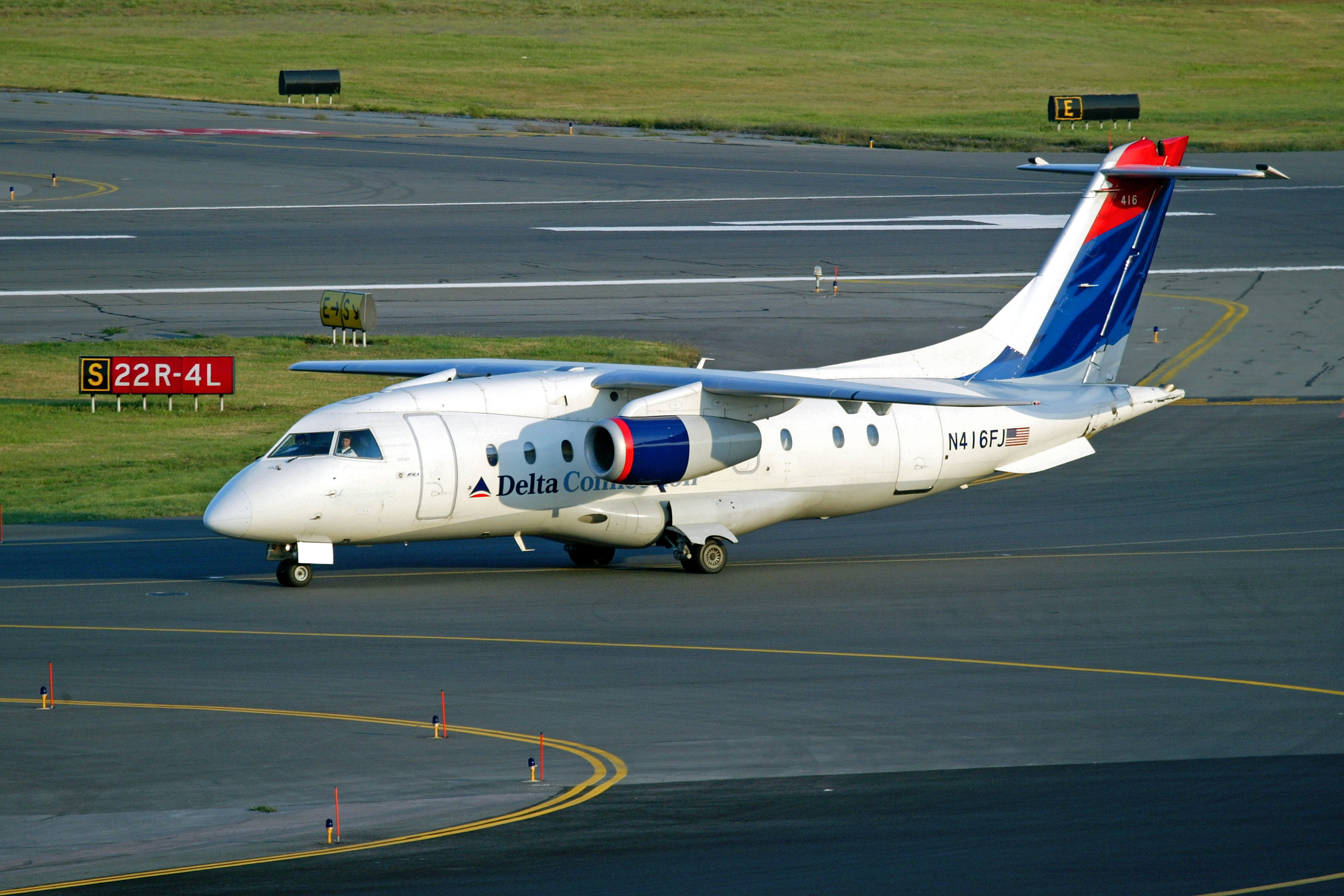
Dornier 328JET operated by Atlantic Coast Airlines

Delta Connection was founded in 1984 as a means of expanding the Delta network to smaller markets via partnerships with regional airlines.

Atlantic Southeast Airlines (ASA) began Delta Connection service on March 1, 1984, from their hub at Hartsfield–Jackson Atlanta International Airport, and soon had a substantial presence at Delta's hub at Dallas Fort Worth International Airport. ASA was a wholly owned subsidiary of Delta Air Lines under the Delta Connection, Inc., holding company from May 11, 1999, to September 7, 2005, when it was purchased by SkyWest, Inc., the parent company of SkyWest Airlines.

Ransome Airlines operated Delta Connection flights in the northeast from March 1, 1984, to June 1, 1986, when it was purchased by Pan Am.

Comair began Delta Connection service on September 1, 1984. Comair primarily operated from Delta's hub at Cincinnati/Northern Kentucky International Airport which was established the same year. Comair also began operating Delta Connection service from Delta's hub at Orlando International Airport in 1987. In January 2000, Comair became a wholly owned subsidiary of Delta Air Lines.

Rio Airways operated Delta Connection flights from their hub in Dallas/Fort Worth from June 1, 1984, to December 14, 1986, when the airline declared bankruptcy. ASA subsequently became the main Delta Connection carrier at the Dallas/Fort Worth hub.

Business Express Airlines operated Delta Connection flights in the northeastern US and Canada from June 1, 1986, to March 15, 2000. The company was purchased by AMR Corporation in 1999 and integrated into the American Eagle Airlines system in 2000.

Following the acquisition of Western Airlines by Delta Air Lines, SkyWest Airlines, which had been operating codeshare service flying as Western Express for Western, became a Delta Connection carrier on April 1, 1987, primarily operating from their hub at Salt Lake City International Airport, which Delta inherited from Western.

Trans States Airlines operated Delta Connection flights from March 1998 to March 31, 2000, mainly from their focus cities in Boston and New York.

In 2002, Chautauqua Airlines became a Delta Connection carrier and replaced Comair as the main provider of regional flights at the Orlando hub.

On November 2, 2004, Atlantic Coast Airlines ended service as a Delta Connection Carrier. Atlantic Coast Airlines reinvented itself as a low fare carrier called Independence Air, based at Washington Dulles International Airport. Atlantic Coast Airlines operated over 30 Dornier 328JET aircraft as part of its Delta Connection service from 2000 until 2005.

On December 22, 2004, Delta Air Lines announced that Republic Airways would order and operate 16 Embraer 170 aircraft under the Delta Connection banner. Since then, it has been announced that the Republic Airways subsidiary Shuttle America would operate the flights. The initial flight took place on September 1, 2005. On May 4, 2005, Delta Air Lines announced that Mesa Air Group subsidiary Freedom Airlines would operate up to 30 Bombardier CRJ200 aircraft under the Delta Connection banner beginning in October 2005. Shortly after the announcement, the decision was made for Freedom Airlines to operate the Embraer ERJ 145 for Delta Connection instead of the CRJ. After a legal battle with Mesa Air Group, Delta and Freedom Airlines terminated their contract, ending all flights on August 31, 2010. On December 21, 2006, Delta announced that Big Sky Airlines would become a Delta Connection carrier, using eight Beechcraft 1900D turboprops out of Boston Logan International Airport.

On March 1, 2007, it was announced that ExpressJet would operate 10 Embraer ERJ 145 aircraft under the Delta Connection banner beginning in June 2007 on flights from Los Angeles International Airport. It was later announced that ExpressJet would operate an additional eight aircraft as Delta Connection. On July 3, 2008, Delta and ExpressJet announced that they had terminated their agreement and that ExpressJet operations as Delta Connection would end by September 1, 2008. On April 30, 2007, it was announced that Pinnacle Airlines would operate 16 Bombardier CRJ900 under the Delta Connection banner starting in December 2007.

=== Merging Delta Connection and Northwest Airlink ===
The merger of Delta Air Lines and Northwest Airlines meant that Northwest's regional brand, Northwest Airlink, would be merged into Delta Connection. The new Delta Connection would include the regional airlines from both the original Delta and Northwest. On November 8, 2008, Delta and Mesaba Airlines, a fully owned regional subsidiary of Northwest Airlines that operated flights as Northwest Airlink with turboprop aircraft and also with regional jet aircraft, announced that the seven CRJ900 aircraft previously operated by Freedom as well as eight new-order aircraft would be operated for Delta Connection beginning February 12, 2009.

Citing cost reductions, Delta Air Lines sold former Northwest Airlines regional subsidiary Mesaba Airlines on July 1, 2010, to Pinnacle Airlines Corp. for $62 million. Its headquarters were moved to Pinnacle's in Memphis on December 26, 2011. Mesaba merged its operations into Pinnacle on January 4, 2012. The same day, Trans States Holdings purchased Compass Airlines from Delta for $20.5 million. It has maintained both regional operations with the airlines as of January 1, 2012.

Delta announced that it would add in-flight WiFi to 223 Delta Connection aircraft beginning in 2011.

Regional carrier GoJet Airlines, also owned by Trans States Holdings, began operations from Detroit Wayne County Metropolitan Airport to cities in the Midwest using 15 CRJ700 aircraft on January 11, 2012.

Following a merger between Atlantic Southeast Airlines (ASA) and ExpressJet, Delta Connection flights operated under the latter's name and ceased operations as ASA. All routes remained the same, but the flights began operating as ExpressJet beginning in 2012.

On July 25, 2012, Delta announced that its wholly owned subsidiary Comair would cease all operations at midnight on September 28, 2012.

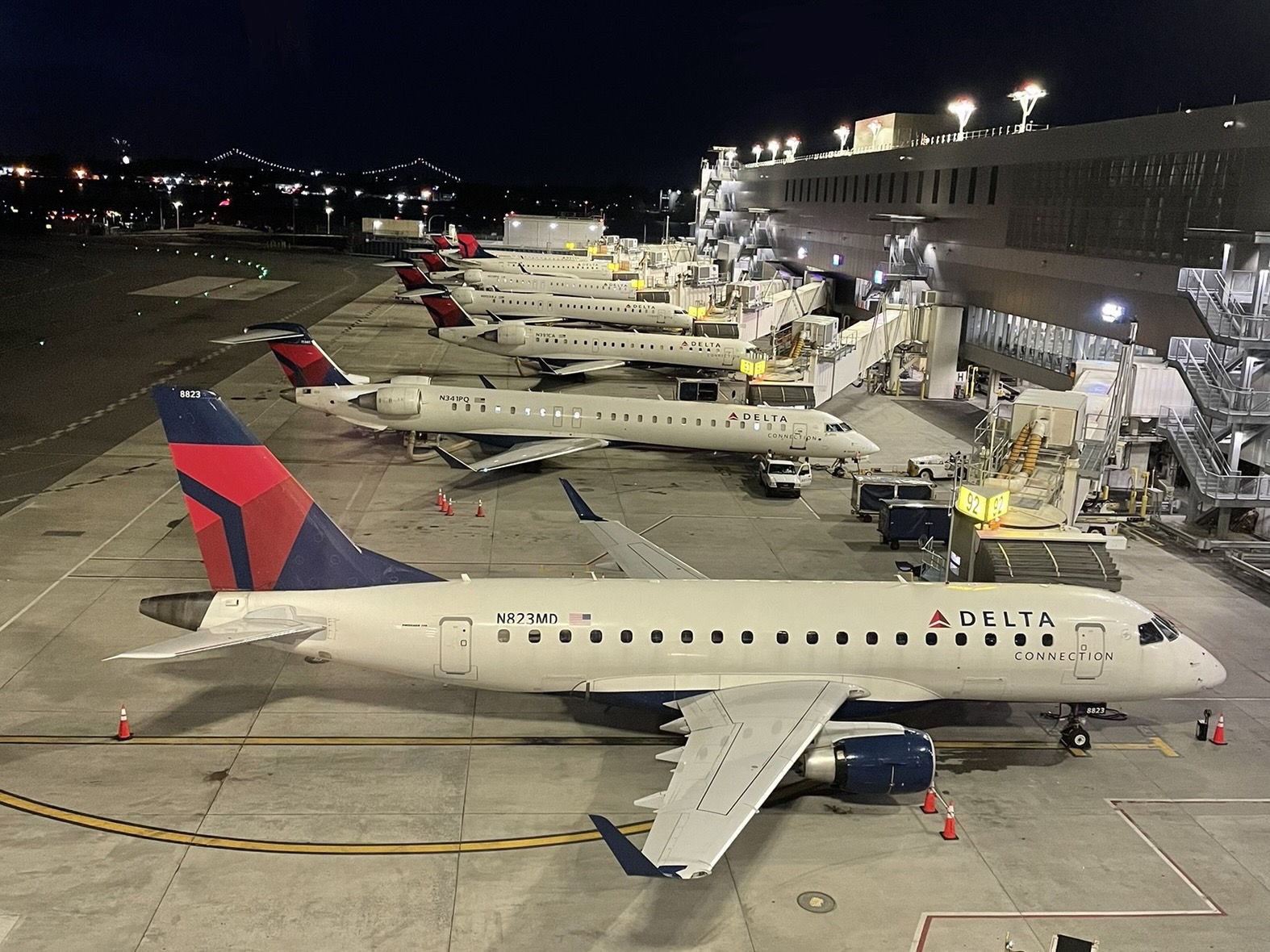
Aircraft lined up at LaGuardia Airport

On May 1, 2013, as a condition of exiting bankruptcy, Pinnacle Airlines became a subsidiary of Delta and was subsequently renamed Endeavor Air.

On December 31, 2014, Chautauqua Airlines operated its last flight for Delta Connection. All aircraft and crew and maintenance bases would be absorbed by the Shuttle America certificate. The conclusion of this service also removed the last operating three seat wide aircraft from the Delta Connection fleet.

On August 9, 2017, it was announced that Delta and ExpressJet would terminate their agreement early with all operations ended in late 2018. The remaining dual-class aircraft financed by Delta would be transferred to Endeavor while ExpressJet would redistribute their financed aircraft to other flying partners. Delta cited ExpressJet's lacking operational performance and focus on trimming their 50-seat fleet as the main reason for terminating the contract early.

In August 2019, Delta announced that the regional fleet would be consolidated from 5 carriers to 3, eliminating GoJet Airlines and Compass Airlines. The Delta Connection aircraft and routes would be transferred to the Delta-owned Endeavor Air and contractors Republic Airway and SkyWest Airlines. Endeavor, Republic, and SkyWest would each focus on different geographic regions with SkyWest becoming the primary partner in Los Angeles, Salt Lake City, and Seattle; and Endeavor growing in Cincinnati, Detroit, and Raleigh–Durham.

In September 2020, Delta announced in an SEC filing that it planned to retire all Delta-owned CRJ200 aircraft by December 2023. This was due to the uncomfortability of the aircraft, and the lack of any premium seats. The final CRJ200 flight flew on December 1 being replaced by the larger CRJ variants. In November 2023, Delta announced that they would add Wi-Fi to their current regional aircraft, and their mainline Boeing 717s starting from mid 2024. In May, Skywest announced the conversion of 19 expired CRJ700s from American Eagle into CRJ550s that would operate under Delta. The CRJ550s were introduced in the summer of 2024. One CRJ200 was reactivated in June 2024 as temporary service to fill in the 50 seat market before the CRJ550s entered service. The airframe was put into storage in September.

=== Historical regional jet fleet ===
The Delta Connection brand, through its various regional and commuter airline partners, operated a variety of jet aircraft over the years including the following types:

Aircraft	Total	Introduced	Retired	Replacement	Notes
BAe 146-200	8	1993	1996	Bombardier CRJ100/200	Operated by Business Express Airlines
Bombardier CRJ100	67	1993	2019	Bombardier CRJ700 series	ER variant used. Operated by Comair and SkyWest Airlines
Bombardier CRJ200	271	1994	2024	Bombardier CRJ700 series	LR variant used. Operated by Comair, Endeavor Air, ExpressJet, SkyWest Airlines, and Atlantic Southeast Airlines
Dornier 328JET	33	2001	2004	Bombardier CRJ100/200	Operated by Atlantic Coast Airlines
Embraer ERJ 135	3	2002	2009	Embraer ERJ 145	LR variant used. Operated by Chautauqua Airlines
Embraer ERJ 145	42	2004	2018	Bombardier CRJ700 series, Embraer E-Jet family	LR and XR variants used. Operated by Chautauqua Airlines, ExpressJet, Freedom Airlines, and Shuttle America

=== Historical turboprop fleet ===
The Delta Connection brand, through its various regional and commuter airline partners, operated a variety of twin turboprop aircraft over the years including the following types:

Aircraft	Total	Introduced	Retired	Replacement	Notes
ATR 72	19	1993	2008	Bombardier CRJ100/200, Bombardier CRJ700 series	Operated by Atlantic Southeast Airlines
BAe Jetstream 41	4	2000	2002	None	Operated by Trans States Airlines
Beechcraft 1900D	8	2006	2008	None	Operated by Big Sky Airlines
de Havilland Canada Dash 8-100	11	2006	2007	None	Operated by Freedom Airlines
de Havilland Canada DHC-6	5	1986	1986	None	Operated by Business Express Airlines
Embraer EMB 120	99	2000	2015	Bombardier CRJ100/200	ER variant used. Operated by Atlantic Southeast Airlines, and SkyWest Airlines (never wore Delta Connection livery)
Fairchild Metroliner	35	1987	1996	Embraer EMB 120	Operated by SkyWest Airlines
Saab 340	49	2008	2011	Bombardier CRJ100/200	Former Northwest Airlink, operated by Mesaba Airlines

== Destinations ==
Delta Connection flights usually fly from or to mainline Delta's hubs. (See sidebar above for hubs.)

List of Destinations
Serving	Country (Administrative Division)	Airport	IATA Code	Notes
Birmingham, AL	United States (Alabama)	Birmingham-Shuttlesworth	BHM	Domestic Destination
Dothan, AL	United States (Alabama)	Dothan Regional Airport	DHN	Domestic Destination
Huntsville, AL	United States (Alabama)	Huntsville International Airport	HSV	Domestic Destination
Mobile, AL	United States (Alabama)	Mobile Regional Airport	MOB	Domestic Destination
Montgomery, AL	United States (Alabama)	Montgomery Regional Airport	MGM	Domestic Destination
Phoenix Metropolitan Area	United States (Arizona)	Phoenix-Sky Harbor	PHX	Domestic Destination
Tucson, AZ	United States (Arizona)	Tucson International Airport	TUS	Domestic Destination
Fayetteville, AR, Bentonville, AR, Springdale, AR, Rogers, AR	United States (Arkansas)	Northwest Arkansas National Airport	XNA	Domestic Destination
Little Rock, AR	United States (Arkansas)	Little Rock-Clinton	LIT	Domestic Destination
Greater Los Angeles	United States (California)	LA-Burbank	BUR	Domestic Destination
Fresno, CA, San Joaquin Valley, Yosemite National Park, CA, Sequoia National Park, CA, Kings Canyon National Park, CA	United States (California)	Fresno-Yosemite	FAT	Domestic Destination
Greater Los Angeles	United States (California)	LA-Long Beach	LGB	Domestic Destination
Greater Los Angeles, CA	United States (California)	Los Angeles International Airport	LAX	Domestic Destination Some flights are seasonal.
San Francisco Bay Area, CA, East Bay, CA	United States (California)	Oakland San Francisco Bay Airport	OAK	Domestic Destination
Inland Empire, CA, Greater Los Angeles, CA	United States, (California)	LA-Ontario	ONT	Domestic Destination
Exuma	Bahamas (Great Exuma)	Exuma International Airport	GGT	International Destination
Eleuthera, Harbour Island, Bahamas, Spanish Wells	Bahamas (Eleuthera)	North Eleuthera Airport	ELH	International Destination
Calgary, Canada	Canada (Alberta)	Calgary International Airport	YYC	International Destination
Greater Montreal	Canada (Quebec)	Montréal-Trudeau	YUL	International Destination
Greater Toronto Area	Canada (Ontario)	Toronto-Pearson	YYZ	International Destination
Greater Vancouver	Canada (British Columbia)	Vancouver International Airport	YVR	International Destination
Winnipeg, Canada	Canada (Manitoba)	Winnipeg James Armstrong Richardson International Airport	YWG	International Destination

== Academy ==
Delta Connection Academy was an airline flight school established in October 1989. The academy was located in Sanford, Florida, on the grounds of the Orlando Sanford International Airport. It contained a fleet of 73 aircraft and had capacity for around 550 flight students. On January 13, 2010, it was acquired by Flight Training Acquisitions for $50 million. Today, it operates as L3Harris Flight Academy.

== Incidents and accidents ==
- On 19 September 1986, an Atlantic Southeast Airlines EMB 120RT (N219AS) struck a mountain near Mantiqueira, Brazil while being delivered to Atlantic Southeast, killing all five on board.
- On January 15, 1987, SkyWest Airlines Flight 1834, a Fairchild Metroliner collided with a Mooney M20 transporting an instructor and a student while on a flight between Pocatello to Salt Lake City in the vicinity of Kearns, Utah. All eight people on Flight 1834 and the two occupants of the Mooney were killed. The cause was found to be a navigation error by the Mooney's student pilot.
- On April 9, 1990, Atlantic Southeast Airlines Flight 2254, an Embraer EMB 120 collided with a Civil Air Patrol Cessna 172 shortly after takeoff from Northeast Alabama Regional Airport, after losing the right stabilizer, the Embraer landed safely back at GAD with no fatalities or injuries but the Cessna crashed, killing both occupants.
- On April 5, 1991, Atlantic Southeast Airlines Flight 2311, an Embraer EMB 120, crashed on approach to the Glynco Jetport serving Brunswick, GA. Twenty passengers and three crew members were killed. The cause was a combination of an engine malfunction and crew fatigue.
- On August 21, 1995, Atlantic Southeast Airlines Flight 529, an Embraer EMB 120, crashed in Burwell, Georgia. Officials determined that a propeller-blade loss and inability to feather the remaining blades caused the accident, which killed eight of the 28 passengers and crew.
- On January 9, 1997, Comair Flight 3272, an Embraer EMB 120, crashed near Monroe, Michigan. The flight, which originated from Cincinnati, Ohio, was on approach to Detroit. All 29 passengers and crew were killed when the plane crashed 18 miles from the airport. The cause was determined as the "FAA's failure to establish adequate aircraft certification standards for flight in icing conditions, the FAA's failure to ensure that an FAA/CTA-approved procedure for the accident airplane's deice system operation was implemented by U.S.-based air carriers, and the FAA's failure to require the establishment of adequate minimum airspeeds for icing conditions."
- On August 27, 2006, Comair Flight 5191, a Bombardier CRJ100, crashed on takeoff at Lexington, Kentucky's Blue Grass Airport with 47 passengers and three crew members on board. Only the first officer survived. The pilots attempted a takeoff from the wrong runway, which was not long enough for the aircraft.
- On July 17, 2012, a suspended SkyWest Airlines pilot, Brian Hedgelin, under investigation by police for the recent fatal stabbing of a woman at his Colorado Springs residence, stole a Bombardier CRJ200 owned by SkyWest Airlines at St. George Regional Airport in Utah. The aircraft was out of service at the time with no other passengers or crew on board. After apparently scaling the airport perimeter fence, Hedgelin started the aircraft and attempted to taxi from the gate but clipped a jet bridge and the terminal building, damaging the left wing and causing a fuel leak; he then taxied the aircraft through a fence and into a parking lot, striking several parked cars in the process. Hedgelin fatally shot himself in the aircraft aisle. The stolen aircraft, Canadair CRJ200ER N865AS, was damaged beyond repair and written off.
- On February 17, 2025, Delta Connection Flight 4819, a Bombardier CRJ900 operated by Endeavor Air, which originated from Minneapolis–Saint Paul International Airport, crashed and flipped over on the runway upon landing at Toronto Pearson International Airport, injuring 21 people.
