= Comair (United States) =

Regional airline of the United States (1977–2012)

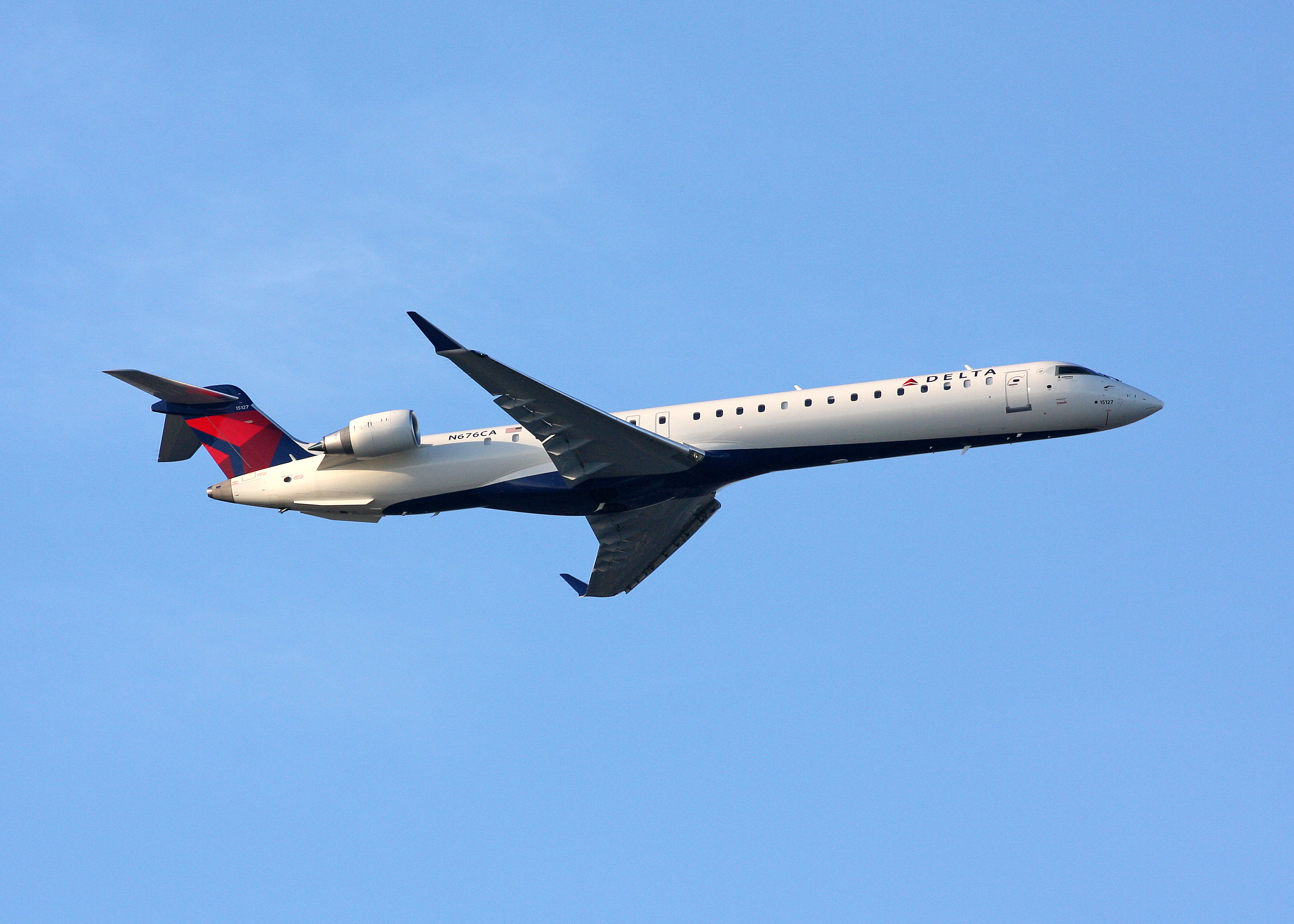
- Comair Bombardier CRJ900ER in 2007
IATA	ICAO	Call sign
OH	COM	COMAIR
- Founded: March 1977
- Commenced operations: April 1, 1977
- Ceased operations: September 29, 2012
- Hubs: Cincinnati; New York–JFK; Orlando
- Focus cities: Atlanta; Boston; New York–LaGuardia
- Frequent-flyer program: SkyMiles
- Alliance: SkyTeam (affiliate; 2000–2012)
- Destinations: 83
- Parent company: Delta Air Lines
- Headquarters: Boone County, Kentucky, U.S.
- Key people: Ryan Gumm (former president)
- Founders: Patrick J. Sowers; Robert T. Tranter; David Mueller; Raymond Mueller

Former Comair logo

Comair was an American regional airline, and a wholly owned subsidiary of Delta Air Lines, headquartered at Cincinnati/Northern Kentucky International Airport in Boone County, Kentucky, United States. Operating under the brand name Delta Connection, Comair operated passenger services to destinations in the United States, Canada, Mexico and the Bahamas.

At the height of its operations in the 1990s and early 2000s, it was the world's largest regional airline, and operated from 1977 until 2012.

== History ==
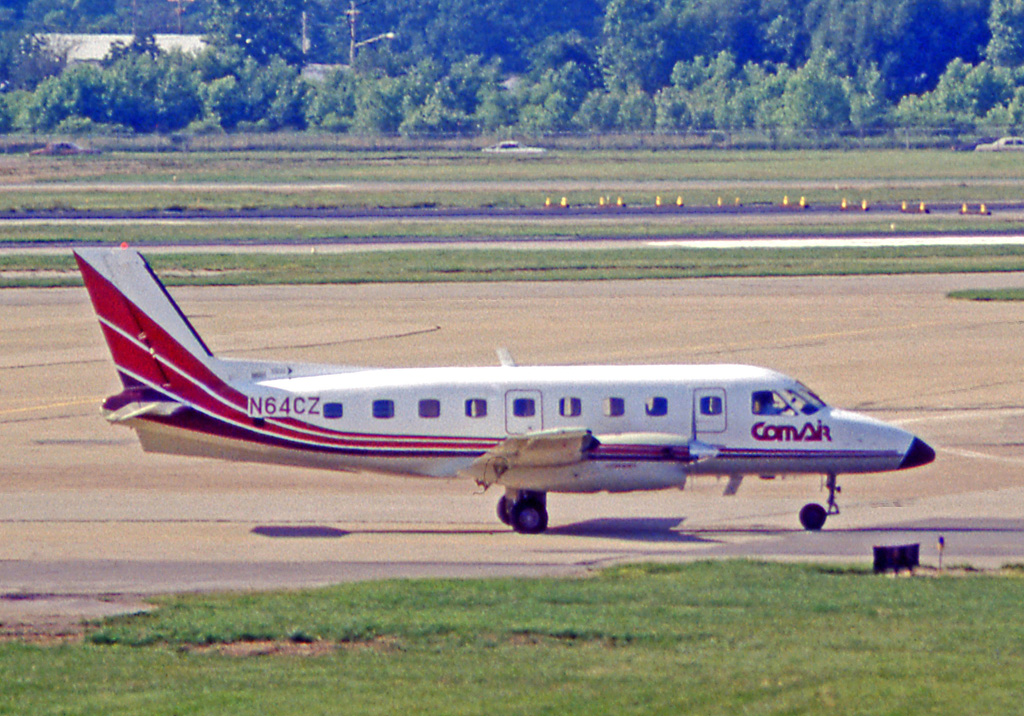
Embraer EMB-110 Bandeirante turboprop airliner wearing Comair titles when operating a commuter schedule to Cleveland Hopkins Airport in 1982

The airline was established in March 1977, and started operations in April 1977. Patrick J. Sowers, Robert T. Tranter, David Mueller and his father Raymond founded the airline in Cincinnati. At the end of its first year of highly profitable operations, two of the company founders, Sowers and Tranter, abruptly resigned the day following the first annual meeting as a "demand for immediate change" after they had uncovered repeated unacceptable and unsafe operational practices by one of the other partners. Comair suffered a fatal crash the year following their departure. Comair began scheduled services to Akron/Canton, Cleveland, and Evansville with two Piper Navajo aircraft. Embraer EMB-110 Bandeirante twin-engine turboprop commuter aircraft were added to Comair's fleet in 1982.

=== Delta relationship and expansion ===
Under its parent Comair Holdings, it became a public company in July 1981. In 1984, Comair became a Delta Connection carrier with Delta Air Lines' establishment of a hub at Cincinnati/Northern Kentucky International Airport (CVG). That same year, Comair introduced its first international flights from Cincinnati to Toronto. Turboprop aircraft operated by Comair on Delta Connection code sharing flights serving the Cincinnati hub included the Embraer EMB-110 Bandeirante, Embraer EMB-120 Brasilia, Saab 340, Short 330 and Swearingen Metro.

In July 1986 Delta Air Lines acquired 20% of Comair stock. The airline began operating a second hub at Orlando International Airport (MCO) during the late 1980s in support of the Delta hub at the airport. In 1992, Comair moved into Concourse C at CVG, as Delta Air Lines gradually continued to acquire more of the airlines stock. In 1993, Comair was the launch customer for the Canadair Regional Jet CRJ100 and would later operate the largest fleet in the world of this twin jet type. By 1999, Comair was the largest regional airline in the country worth over 2 billion, transporting 6 million passengers yearly to 83 destinations on 101 aircraft. That same year, in addition to shorter range flights from its Cincinnati and Orlando hubs, Comair as the Delta Connection was operating nonstop flights between Cincinnati and Nassau, Bahamas, nonstop between Cincinnati and Colorado Springs, nonstop between Boston and Myrtle Beach, nonstop between Boston and Montreal, and also nonstop between Tulsa and Las Vegas with the latter being the westernmost destination ever served by the airline. Delta Air Lines acquired full ownership on October 22, 1999 at a cost of over $2 billion.

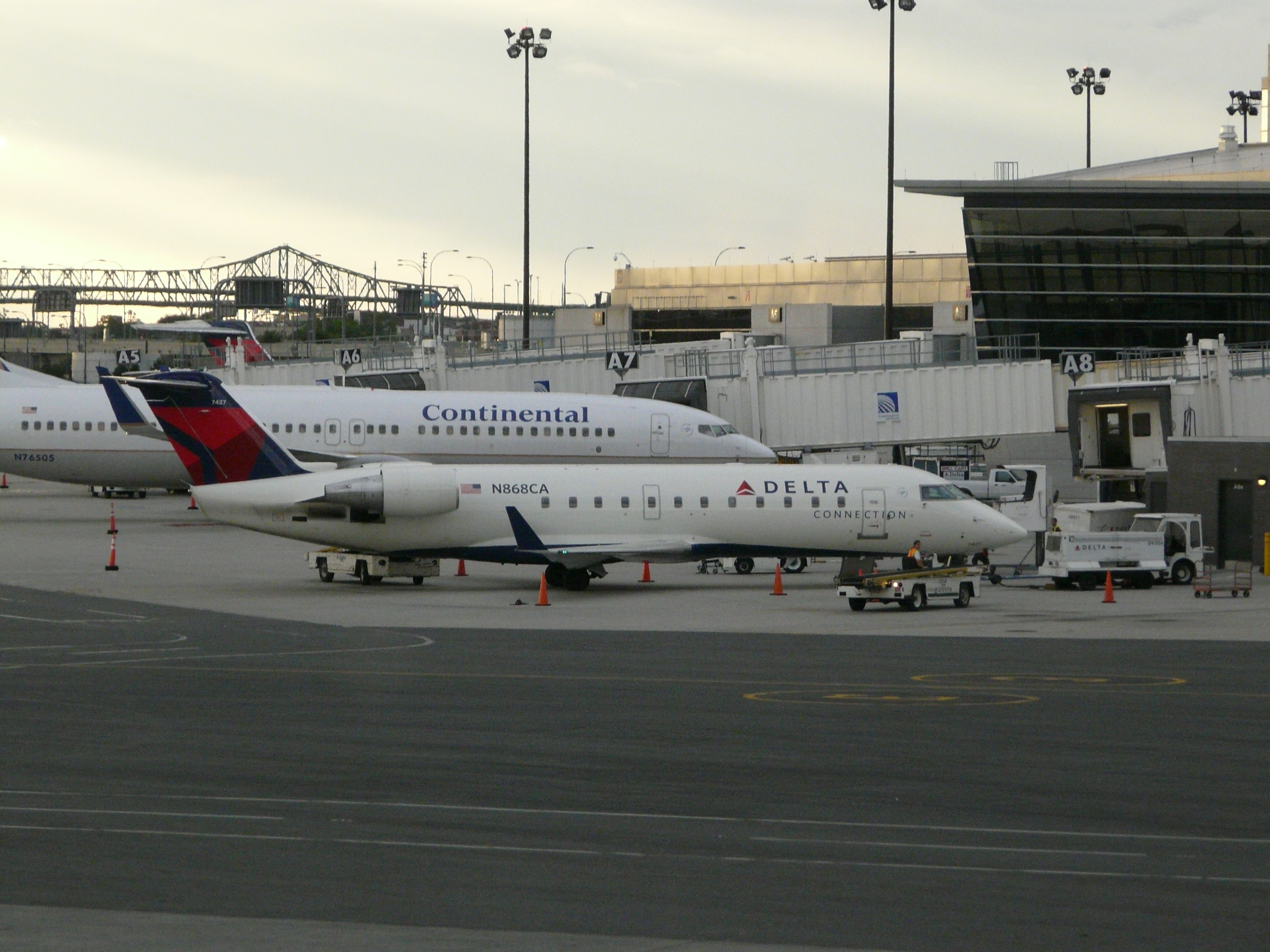
Comair CRJ100ER with new livery at Boston Logan International Airport

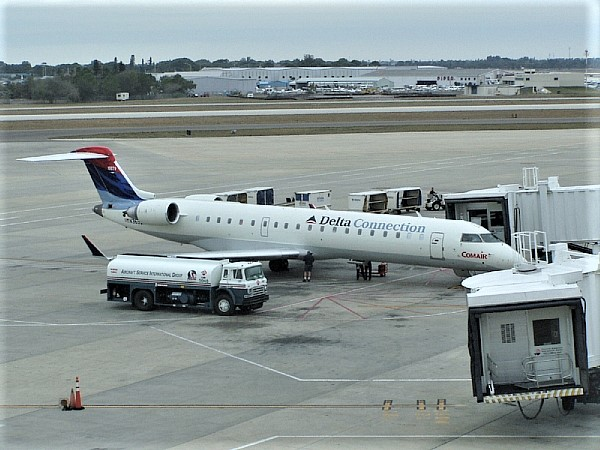
Comair CRJ700 at Sarasota-Bradenton International Airport in Delta Connection livery

=== 2000s ===
On March 26, 2001, Comair's pilots went on strike. The strike cancelled the airline's flights and grounded its fleet. The strike caused substantial disruption to Delta's operations, grounding connections to 95 cities. A core issue was pilot salaries; pilots at regional airlines were paid substantially less than mainline carriers. The strike ended 89 days later, in June, after the pilots approved a contract that included pay raises.

Comair came to nationwide attention during winter 2004 when it canceled all of its flights on Saturday, December 25 and Sunday, December 26, stranding 30,000 people. The reason was a combination of record snow and a crew scheduling software flaw. On December 23 and 24, a record snowfall hit the Cincinnati area, forcing the airline to deplete its entire supply of deicing solution. With the area highways closed due to the blizzard, no additional deicing fluid could be delivered to the airport, and Comair was forced to cancel all flights beginning on Friday December 24. After receiving necessary supplies overnight, the airline began the process of startup when the computer system that handled flight crew assignments shut down. It had been designed with a hard coded limit of changes for a month, which were far exceeded due to the poor weather in the prior days. The software had been in the process of being phased out at the airline in favor of a new system with more capabilities.

Comair's parent company Delta Air Lines filed for Chapter 11 bankruptcy on September 14, 2005, bringing Comair into bankruptcy along with it. Comair announced that would cut costs by million dollars annually. These savings were achieved by aircraft, flight, and employee reductions.

In late 2006, Comair opened an additional crew base and hub at New York City's JFK Airport. Comair had the lowest percentage of on-time flights of all major U.S. carriers during late 2006. This was the result of starting operations at JFK, a congested airport with poor staffing and an unfortunate terminal and aircraft ramp layout that severely dropped Comair's ratings in the DOT listings. In 2008, Comair tied with American for the lowest on-time performance, with 70% of its flights arriving on-time.

During the course of 2007, Comair closed down its crew bases in Greensboro, North Carolina and Orlando, Florida.

On May 25, 2007, Delta announced that Comair would operate 14 stretched CRJ900 aircraft for Delta Connection. These aircraft were to replace 14 smaller CRJ100 aircraft in Comair's fleet. Parent company Delta Air Lines replaced Comair's service in these destinations with Atlantic Southeast Airlines, a subsidiary of SkyWest, Inc., and Chautauqua Airlines, a subsidiary of Republic Airways Holdings. In early 2008, Delta announced it was going to reduce its domestic capacity by 4-5%, in which Comair would reduce its 50-seat Canadair Regional Jet fleet by 8-14 aircraft. In March 2008, when the price of oil rose, Delta announced it would further reduce domestic capacity.

On February 10, 2009, Delta Connection announced that ground handling and gate service positions for Comair, Mesaba Airlines, and Compass Airlines would be transitioned to a new Delta Air Lines subsidiary. The interim name of the new company was Regional Handling Services until a new name was confirmed before September. Each airline maintained its own flying operations. Services including ticketing and baggage handling were to be handled by RHS beginning in the 3rd Quarter of 2009. There was to be a reduction in the workforce. The largest cut was to come from Comair which was to reduce its staffing by nearly half. A voluntary termination was introduced and involuntary cuts were possible later in the year as Delta mainline ground employees took over positions of Delta subsidiary ground employees that had been contracted to Comair and then Regional Elite Airline Services.

=== 2010s ===
On September 1, 2010, Comair announced that it would reduce its fleet by eliminating all of its aging Bombardier CRJ100/200 aircraft, expecting to have retired them all sometime in 2012. Retirement would start in 2011. Also, it expected to operate a fleet of 44 aircraft, and planned to reduce its workforce. Layoffs were to begin after September 2010, furloughing the pilot group to around 500 pilots (down to a 1999 date of hire). The company's fleet was to consist of only CRJ700 and CRJ900 aircraft.

In July 2012, Delta announced that it would be shutting down Comair. The last Comair flight flew from Jacksonville International Airport to Minneapolis/Saint Paul International Airport on September 29, 2012, ending more than three decades of operation.

== Destinations ==
Comair operated passenger services to 83 destinations in the United States, Canada, Mexico and the Bahamas at its peak in 2005.

== Fleet ==
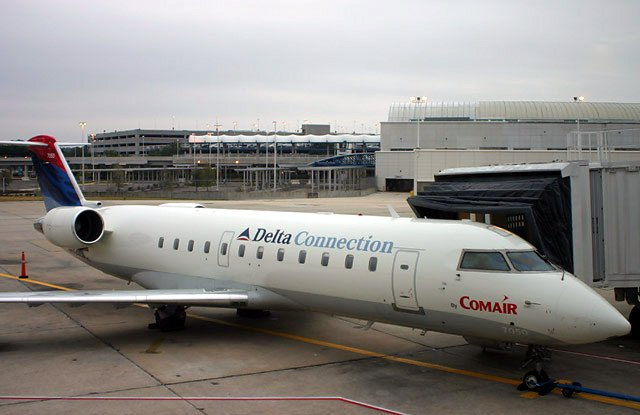
A Comair CRJ100ER at Jacksonville International Airport

Before its downsizing, Comair operated the largest number of Bombardier (formerly Canadair) regional jets of any airline with over 170 planes. At the time of closure, the Comair fleet consisted of just seven aircraft with an average age of 11.1 years, all of which were operated on Delta Connection services:

Comair fleet
Aircraft	In Service	Passengers			Notes
Aircraft	In Service	F	Y	Total	Notes
Bombardier CRJ100ER	2	–	50	50	Retired
Bombardier CRJ700ER	2	9	56	65	Transferred to GoJet Airlines
Bombardier CRJ900ER	3	12	64	76	Transferred to SkyWest Airlines
Total	7				

=== Historical fleet ===
Comair historical fleet
Aircraft	Total	Introduced	Retired	Notes
Bombardier CRJ200ER	51	1997	2012	
Embraer EMB-110 Bandeirante	10	1981	1997	
Embraer EMB-120 Brasilia	40	1988	2002	
Piper PA-31 Navajo	4	1977	Unknown	
Saab 340A	19	1984	2000	
Short 330	6	1981	1987	
Swearingen Metro	26	1981	1998	

== Headquarters ==
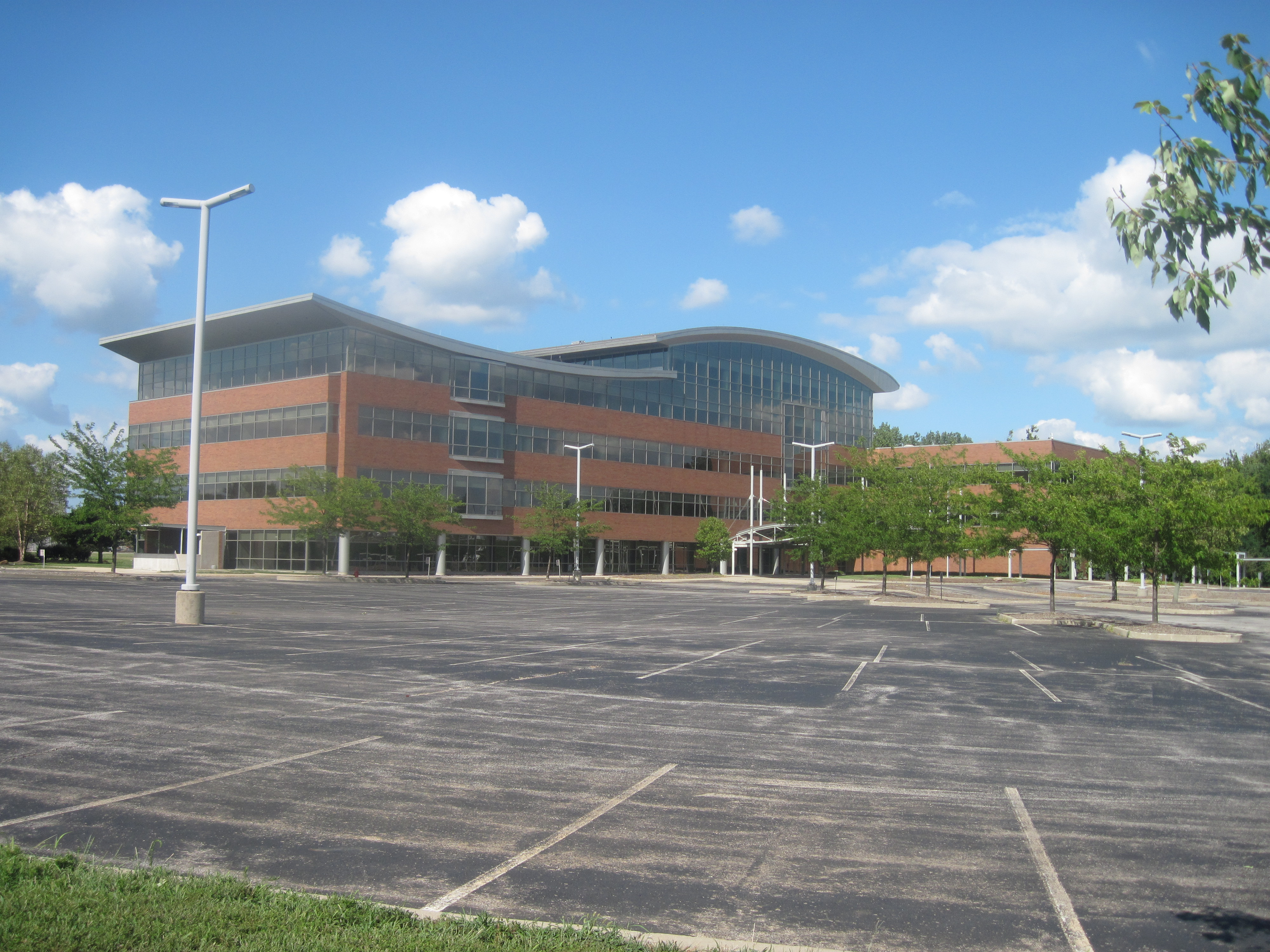
77 Comair Boulevard, former headquarters

Comair was headquartered in the Comair General Office Building on the grounds of Cincinnati-Northern Kentucky International Airport in unincorporated Boone County, Kentucky, United States, west of Erlanger, and south of Cincinnati, Ohio. As the airline ended operations, up to 30 employees were to remain working at the headquarters.

77 Comair Boulevard formerly served as the corporate headquarters of Comair. The building is on South Airfield Road. In 2010, after the airline began downsizing, it considered leaving the building and moving to another location near the airport. A spokesperson did not disclose how much office space the airline occupied; she said it was planning to reduce its space by 20 to 25 percent. In early 2011, Comair vacated the building. Amazon Air began leasing space in the building in 2018.

== Accidents ==
- On October 8, 1979, Comair Flight 444 en route to Nashville, TN, a Piper PA-31 Navajo light aircraft, crashed shortly after takeoff from Cincinnati-Northern Kentucky International Airport. All eight people aboard were killed. The NTSB determined the probable cause of the accident was a partial loss of power immediately after liftoff. The pilot failed to take immediate corrective action, such as rejecting the takeoff or raising landing gear and flaps. Contributing factors were the pilot's inexperience with multi-engine aircraft, a hurried departure, inadequate training, inexperienced company management, and ineffective FAA certification and surveillance of the operator.
- On November 8, 1990, a Comair Swearingen SA227-AC Metro III, registered as N445AC, was performing a flight test. Things went south when the pilots landed the aircraft with its landing gears up. All three occupants survived with no injuries but the airframe was a write-off.
- On January 9, 1997, Comair Flight 3272, an Embraer EMB 120 Brasilia, registered as N265CA, crashed while on approach into Detroit Metropolitan Wayne County Airport, killing all 29 people aboard.
- On March 19, 2001, Comair Flight 5054, an Embraer EMB 120RT Brasilia, registered as N266CA, sustained substantial damage after corkscrewing from 17000 feet due to icing. None out of the 28 on board were injured.
- On August 27, 2006, Comair Flight 5191, a Bombardier CRJ-100ER, crashed while taking off from Lexington's Blue Grass Airport. 49 of the 50 on board, including all 47 passengers, were killed.

== See also ==
- List of defunct airlines of the United States
