= NewCo =

Temporary name for a company

A NewCo or Newco is a term used to describe a corporate spin-off, startup, or subsidiary company before they are assigned a final name, or to proposed merged companies to distinguish the to-be-formed combined entity with an existing company involved in the merger which may have the same (or a similar) name. In a handful of cases the new company may retain the name "Newco".

The term can also be used to describe a company that was created to replace its predecessor, which ceased to exist for reasons such as financial issues: the creation of a NewCo to continue the existence of Rangers F.C. was a notable example.

== Examples ==
- IBM GTS - Managed Infrastructure Services → Kyndryl
- 3M’s data storage business (spun off in 1996) → Imation
- Abbott Laboratories pharmaceutical division → AbbVie
- Atlas Copco Mining and Rock Excavation Technique business area → Epiroc
- AT&T computer hardware subsidiary → NCR
- Bayer chemicals operations → Lanxess
- BP petrochemicals group → Innovene
- Merged entity of Cedar Fair and Six Flags → CopperSteel HoldCo, Inc. (immediately renamed Six Flags Entertainment Corporation)
- Ford Motor Company vehicle components division → Visteon
- Hewlett-Packard instrumentation division → Agilent Technologies
- Karstadt merging with Quelle → Arcandor
- Northwest Airlines regional operations → Compass Airlines
- Merged entity of NBC Universal and Comcast programming assets → NBCUniversal
- RAG AG (Degussa, Steag, Immobilien) → Evonik Industries
- The Rangers Football Club plc (liquidated in 2012) → Sevco Scotland Ltd (later renamed The Rangers Football Club Ltd)
- Siemens semiconductor subsidiary → Infineon
- Barnes & Noble Nook's subsidiary → Nook Media
- DaimlerChrysler MTU Friedrichshafen division → Tognum (later acquired by Rolls-Royce plc and now the Rolls-Royce Power Systems subsidiary)
- Merged entity of T-Mobile USA and MetroPCS → corporate name of T-Mobile US; kept both T-Mobile and MetroPCS (later modified to Metro by T-Mobile) brands
- Fortive precision technology companies → TBD

== See also ==
- Advent corporation (placeholder)
- Placeholder name § Companies and organizations
