= Comair Flight 444 =

1979 aviation accident near Cincinnati, Kentucky, USA

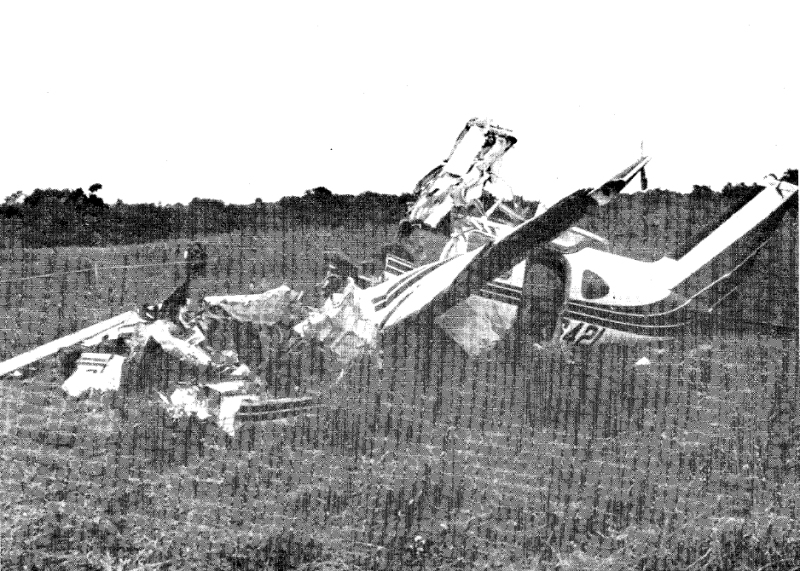
- The wreckage of the aircraft

Occurrence
- Date: October 8, 1979
- Summary: Engine failure and Pilot error leading to crash
- Site: Near Cincinnati/Northern Kentucky International Airport, Boone County, Kentucky, United States

Aircraft
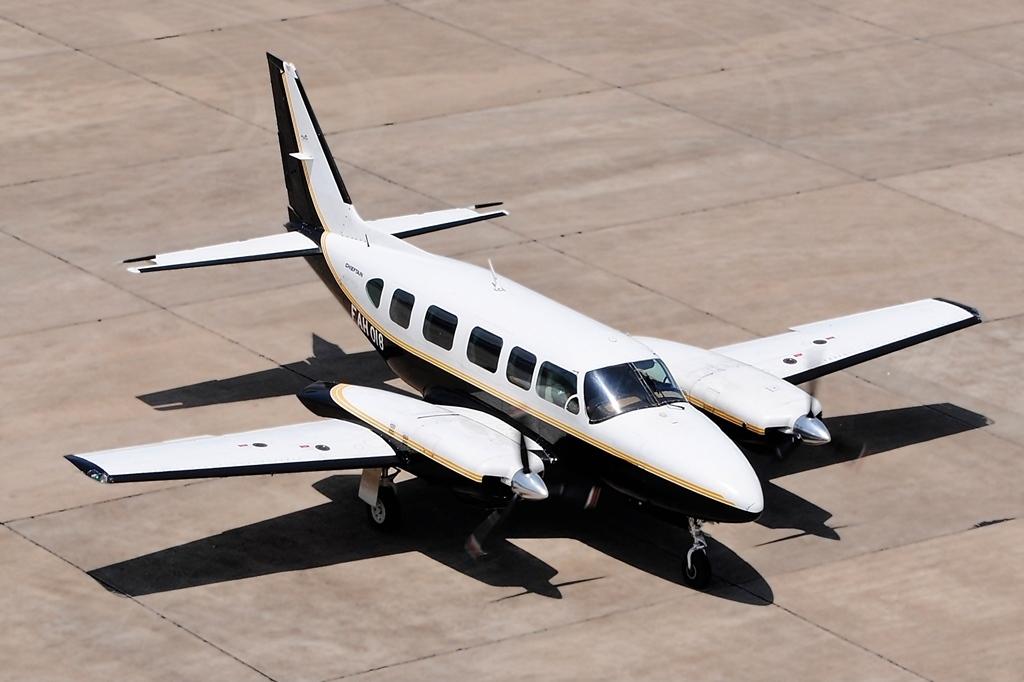
- A Piper PA-31-350 Navajo Chieftain, similar to the aircraft involved in the accident
- Aircraft type: Piper PA-31-350 Navajo Chieftain
- Operator: Comair
- Registration: N6642L
- Flight origin: Cincinnati/Northern Kentucky International Airport (CVG)
- Destination: Dayton, Ohio
- Occupants: 8
- Passengers: 7
- Crew: 1
- Fatalities: 8
- Survivors: 0

Comair Flight 444 was a chartered domestic passenger flight operated by Comair, which crashed shortly after takeoff from Cincinnati/Northern Kentucky International Airport on October 8, 1979. The flight was en route to Dayton, Ohio. All eight were killed due the accident.

The NTSB concluded that the crash was resulted from a loss of control caused by a partial loss of power from one engine during takeoff. The NTSB recommended increased scrutiny of pilot training programs and weight-and-balance enforcement for small commuter flights.

== Accident ==
The aircraft, a twin-engine Piper PA-31-350 Navajo Chieftain, took off from Runway 27 at Cincinnati/Northern Kentucky International Airport (CVG) in the early evening.

After approximately 1,500 to 2,000 feet of takeoff roll, the aircraft lifted off abruptly and began a shallow climb, reaching an altitude of about 150 feet above the runway. Shortly after liftoff, the pilot reported an engine power loss, and the tower controller cleared the aircraft to return for landing. Within seconds, the aircraft rolled sharply to the right, inverted, and entered a nose-down descent before impacting the ground. Witnesses stated that the aircraft appeared to struggle to gain altitude and banked erratically before crashing in an open field approximately 9000 ft from the runway.

The aircraft was completely destroyed.

== Aircraft and crew ==
The aircraft involved was a Piper PA-31-350 Navajo Chieftain, registered to Comair, a regional airline based in Cincinnati. The pilot was William Paul, 30, of Marysville, Indiana. He held a commercial pilot license but had limited experience in multi-engine aircraft.

== Victims ==
All eight people on board were killed due the accident. Six died instantly, one died on the way to the hospital and one died at the hospital. The victims were residents of the Greater Cincinnati and Dayton areas:

- John Huston, 53, of Fairfield, Ohio
- Douglas Jones, 50, of Madison Township, Ohio
- Jeffrey Lake, 29, of Forest Park, Ohio
- William Myers, 43, of Montgomery, Ohio
- Thomas Oatts, 52, of Loveland, Ohio
- Ronald Perry, 39, of Dayton, Ohio
- J. Pat Warman, 47, of West Chester, Ohio
- Pilot William Paul, 30, of Marysville, Indiana

== Investigation ==
The National Transportation Safety Board (NTSB) determined that the probable cause of the crash was a partial loss of power from one engine during the initial climb, followed by a loss of control due to improper response by the pilot. The NTSB found several contributing factors:

- The aircraft was overloaded by approximately 195 pounds beyond its maximum allowable takeoff weight.
- The pilot failed to retract the landing gear and flaps, contributing to increased drag and reduced climb performance.
- The pilot did not abort the takeoff when engine performance issues were first observed.
- The airline's training, certification, and supervision practices were found to be inadequate.

The accident resulted in three recommendations:

- Require that pilots operating under 14 CFR Part 135 receive comprehensive training on aircraft performance and handling characteristics when operating at or near the maximum certificated gross weight and/or at the limits of the center of gravity (CG) envelope.
- In collaboration with industry stakeholders, develop flight data recorder (FDR) standards for complex aircraft that reflect their intended operational use.
- Initiate the drafting of specifications and provide funding for the research and development of affordable flight data recorders (FDRs), cockpit voice recorders (CVRs), and combined recording systems suitable for complex general aviation aircraft. Establish guidelines for these systems, including a cost ceiling appropriate to the aircraft's price and its intended operational role.
