= Trans States Airlines =

Regional airline of the United States (1982–2020)

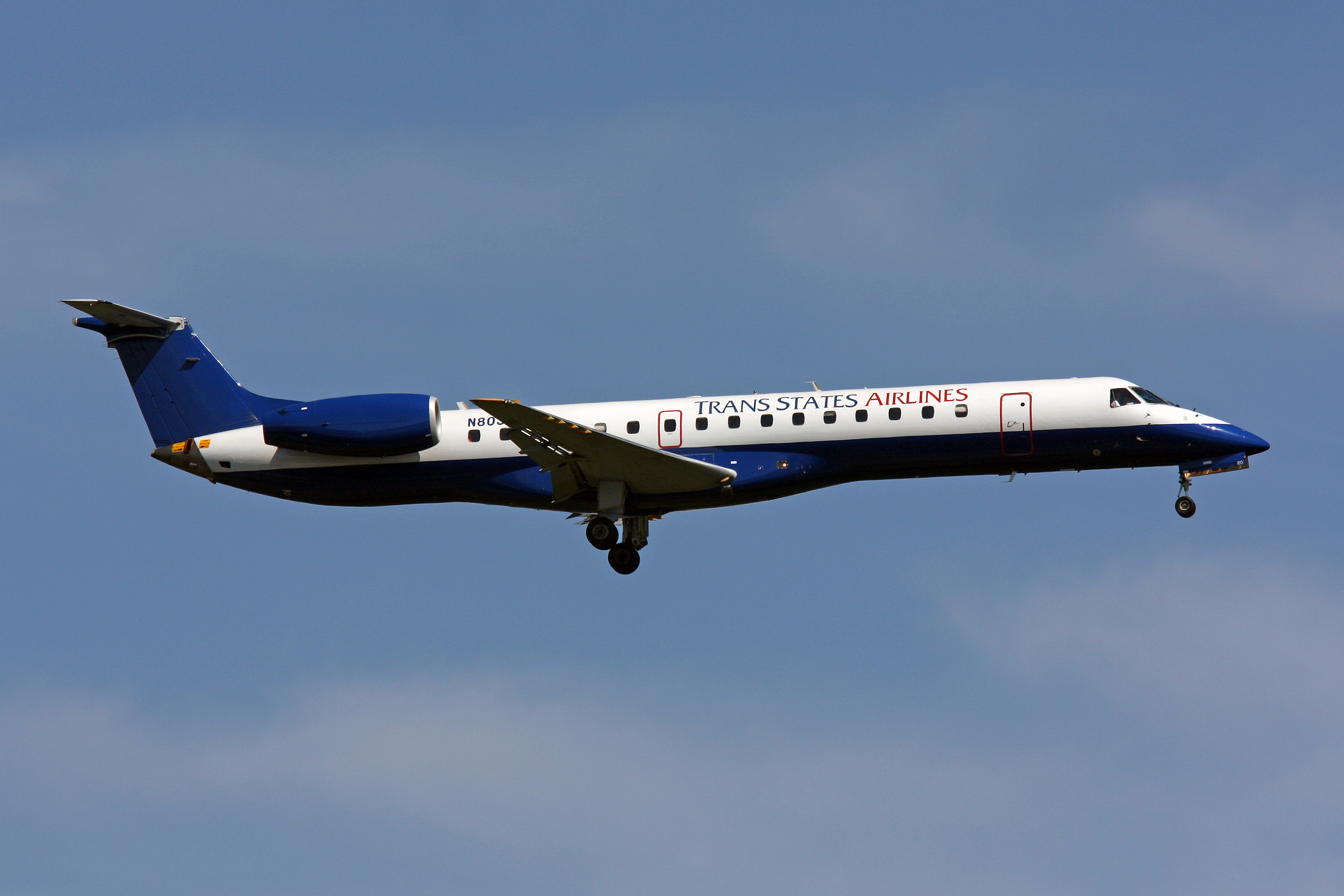
- Trans States Airlines Embraer ERJ 145 at Washington Dulles International Airport in 2009
IATA	ICAO	Call sign
AX	LOF	WATERSKI
- Founded: 1982 (as Resort Air)
- Ceased operations: April 1, 2020
- AOC #: RAIA379A
- Hubs: Baltimore; Boston; Chicago–O'Hare; Cleveland; Denver; Houston–Intercontinental; New York–LaGuardia; Pittsburgh; St. Louis; Washington–Dulles; Washington–National
- Frequent-flyer program: AAdvantage (American); Dividend Miles (US Airways); Mileage Plus (United)
- Alliance: Oneworld (American/US Airways); Star Alliance (United/US Airways)
- Parent company: Trans States Holdings
- Headquarters: Bridgeton, Missouri, United States
- Key people: Hulas Kanodia (Chairman); Richard A. Leach (President); Brian Randow (COO)

Trans States Airlines was a regional airline in the United States that operated from 1982 until 2020, when it shut down due to the COVID-19 pandemic. It was owned by Trans States Holdings and headquartered in Bridgeton, Missouri. At the time of its closing, the airline operated flights for United Airlines under the United Express brand. Trans States Airlines ceased all operations on April 1, 2020.

== History ==
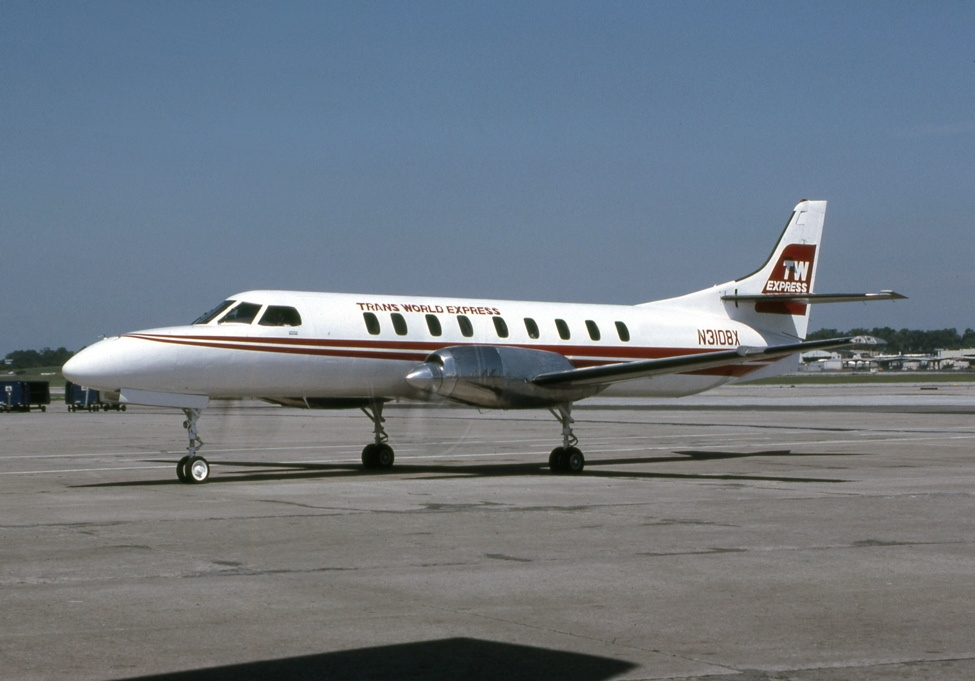
Trans World Express Swearingen Metro III operated by Resort Air, photographed in 1985

The company began operations as Resort Air in 1982. As an independent commuter air carrier, Resort Air operated Swearingen Metro propjets from a small hub located in St. Louis (STL) with service to Carbondale, Illinois; Columbia, Missouri; Fort Leonard Wood, MO; Joplin, MO; Lake of the Ozarks, MO; Springfield, IL; and Springfield, MO. In 1985, the company entered into an agreement with Trans World Airlines (TWA) to operate as Trans World Express serving six cities in Missouri and Illinois. In 1989 Resort Air changed its name to Trans States Airlines. Many new aircraft were added to replace the Swearingen Metro planes including the BAe Jetstream model 31 and model 41 as well as much larger ATR 42s and ATR 72s. New service was added to many more cities from St. Louis and in 1999, Embraer ERJ 145 regional jets were added for the Trans World Express system expanding service to several cities much further distant from St. Louis.

In 1993 TSA began operations on the West Coast as USAir Express at Los Angeles (LAX) with service to Fresno, Monterey, Ontario, CA, Orange County, Palm Springs, San Diego, and Santa Barbara nonstop from LAX with BAe Jetstream 31 propjets. The operation continued until the year 2000.

On the east coast, in 1995, TSA began operations as a code share feeder airline into New York City JFK Airport for both Trans World Express and United Express. By 1999, Trans States had begun operations as a Delta Connection code share air carrier for Delta Air Lines at New York's JFK Airport with Embraer ERJ 145 regional jets and BAe Jetstream 41 propjets with nonstop service to Albany, NY, Baltimore, Greensboro, NC, Hartford/Springfield, Norfolk, VA, Philadelphia, Pittsburgh, Raleigh/Durham, Richmond, VA and Rochester, NY. Flights under the USAirways Express banner were also performed at Pittsburgh.

In December 2001, TWA merged into American Airlines. All Trans States flights operating as Trans World Express then began flying and American Connection. American later dismantled the St. Louis hub operation created by TWA, and the American Connection flights ended in 2009. In 2015 American merged with US Airways and the US Airways Express flights operated by Trans States then began flying as American Eagle. These flights then ended in 2018.

In 2006 Trans States briefly operated a small hub at San Antonio, Texas flying Embraer ERJ 145s. The service was performed under the United Express banner with flights from San Antonio to Albuquerque, Colorado Springs, Kansas City, New Orleans, Oklahoma City, Omaha, and Tulsa.

The call sign "Waterski" and the ICAO 3-letter identifier "LOF," which stands for 'Lodge of the Four Seasons', are from the early days when the company was operated as Resort Air and took visitors to the Lake of the Ozarks in Missouri.

In 2015, the airline began a hub operation at Denver under the United Express banner and carried 3.6 million passengers for the year.

In February 2020, Trans States announced their intent to gradually cease operations through 2020 and transfer their fleet of ERJ-145's to ExpressJet Airlines per an agreement with United Airlines. However, on March 17, 2020, CEO Rick Leach sent a memo to employees stating that due to the impact of the COVID-19 pandemic on aviation, the airline would cease operations on April 1, 2020, much earlier than originally expected. Compass Airlines, another regional airline owned by Trans States Holdings, also announced a cessation of operations effective April 7, 2020, leaving GoJet Airlines as the only operating airline owned by Trans States Holdings. The ERJ 145s that were transferred to ExpressJet were then transferred to CommutAir later in 2020 as ExpressJet was subsequently shut down. CommutAir is also a United Express operator.

The final Trans States Airlines flight was United Express Flight 4695 from Springfield, Missouri to Denver, Colorado on April 1, 2020.

== St. Louis TWA Express Hub Operations in 1990 ==
Trans States was operating 48-passenger ATR 42 and 19-passenger Fairchild Metroliner III propjets in Trans World Express code share service for Trans World Airlines at this time from the TWA hub in St. Louis with nonstop flights to the following destinations:

- Burlington, IA
- Chicago, IL (Meigs Field) - one stop service via Springfield, IL
- Columbia, MO
- Des Moines, IA
- Joplin, MO
- Lincoln, NE
- Madison, WI
- Memphis, TN
- Moline, IL
- Peoria, IL
- Sioux City, IA
- Springfield, IL
- Springfield, MO

== St. Louis TWA Express Hub Operations in 1995 ==
By 1995, Trans States had expanded its Trans World Express code sharing operations at the TWA St. Louis hub and was operating ATR 42, ATR 72, BAe Jetstream 31 and Jetstream 41, and Embraer EMB 120 turboprops with nonstop flights to the following destinations:

- Birmingham, AL
- Bloomington, IL
- Burlington, IA
- Cape Girardeau, MO
- Cedar Rapids, IA
- Champaign, IL
- Chicago, IL (Midway Airport)
- Columbia, MO
- Decatur, IL
- Des Moines, IA
- Evansville, IN
- Fayetteville, AR
- Fort Wayne, IN
- Grand Rapids, MI
- Joplin, MO
- Lexington, KY
- Knoxville, TN
- Madison, WI
- Marion, IL
- Memphis, TN
- Milwaukee, WI
- Moline, IL
- Paducah, KY
- Peoria, IL
- Quincy, IL
- Sioux City, IA
- South Bend, IN
- Springfield, IL
- Springfield, MO
- Waterloo, IA
- Chicago, IL (O'Hare)
- St Louis, MO
- Mexico City (Mexico)

== United Express destinations ==
Prior to its shutdown, the airline operated to the following destinations under the United Express brand:

City	Country (Subdivision)	IATA	Airport	Notes
Birmingham	United States (Alabama)	BHM	Birmingham–Shuttlesworth International Airport	
Flagstaff	United States (Arizona)	FLG	Flagstaff Pulliam Airport	
Kingman	United States (Arizona)	IMG	Kingman Airport	
Tucson	United States (Arizona)	TUS	Tucson International Airport	
Fayetteville	United States (Arkansas)	XNA	Northwest Arkansas Regional Airport	
Little Rock	United States (Arkansas)	LIT	Little Rock National Airport	
Monterey	United States (California)	MRY	Monterey Regional Airport	
Colorado Springs	United States (Colorado)	COS	City of Colorado Springs Municipal Airport	
Denver	United States (Colorado)	DEN	Denver International Airport	Hub
Durango	United States (Colorado)	DRO	Durango–La Plata County Airport	
Grand Junction	United States (Colorado)	GJT	Grand Junction Regional Airport	
Gunnison	United States (Colorado)	GUC	Gunnison–Crested Butte Regional Airport	Seasonal
Hayden/Steamboat Springs	United States (Colorado)	HDN	Yampa Valley Airport	
Montrose/Telluride	United States (Colorado)	MTJ	Montrose Regional Airport	
Fort Walton Beach	United States (Florida)	VPS	Destin–Fort Walton Beach Airport	
Idaho Falls	United States (Idaho)	IDA	Idaho Falls Regional Airport	
Chicago	United States (Illinois)	ORD	O'Hare International Airport	Hub
Moline	United States (Illinois)	MLI	Quad City International Airport	
Peoria	United States (Illinois)	PIA	General Wayne A. Downing Peoria International Airport	
Evansville	United States (Indiana)	EVV	Evansville Regional Airport	
South Bend	United States (Indiana)	SBN	South Bend International Airport	
Cedar Rapids	United States (Iowa)	CID	Eastern Iowa Airport	
Des Moines	United States (Iowa)	DSM	Des Moines International Airport	
Wichita	United States (Kansas)	ICT	Wichita Eisenhower National Airport	
Kansas City	United States (Missouri)	MCI	Kansas City International Airport	
Louisville	United States (Kentucky)	SDF	Louisville International Airport	
Detroit	United States (Michigan)	DTW	Detroit Metropolitan Airport	
Grand Rapids	United States (Michigan)	GRR	Gerald R. Ford International Airport	
Lansing	United States (Michigan)	LAN	Capital Region International Airport	
Traverse City	United States (Michigan)	TVC	Cherry Capital Airport	
St. Louis	United States (Missouri)	STL	St. Louis Lambert International Airport	Hub
Springfield	United States (Missouri)	SGF	Springfield–Branson National Airport	
Billings	United States (Montana)	BIL	Billings Logan International Airport	
Great Falls	United States (Montana)	GTF	Great Falls International Airport	
Helena	United States (Montana)	HLN	Helena Regional Airport	
Kalispell	United States (Montana)	FCA	Glacier Park International Airport	FAA LID code is GPI
Missoula	United States (Montana)	MSO	Missoula International Airport	
Boston	United States (Massachusetts)	BOS	Boston Logan International Airport	
Lincoln	United States (Nebraska)	LNK	Lincoln Airport	
Omaha	United States (Nebraska)	OMA	Eppley Airfield	
Albuquerque	United States (New Mexico)	ABQ	Albuquerque International Sunport	
Santa Fe	United States (New Mexico)	SAF	Santa Fe Regional Airport	
Buffalo	United States (New York)	BUF	Buffalo Niagara International Airport	
Rochester	United States (New York)	ROC	Greater Rochester International Airport	
Newark	United States (New Jersey)	EWR	Newark Liberty International Airport	Hub
Greensboro	United States (North Carolina)	GSO	Piedmont Triad International Airport	
Raleigh/Durham	United States (North Carolina)	RDU	Raleigh–Durham International Airport	
Bismarck	United States (North Dakota)	BIS	Bismarck Municipal Airport	
Dickinson	United States (North Dakota)	DIK	Dickinson Theodore Roosevelt Regional Airport	
Fargo	United States (North Dakota)	FAR	Hector International Airport	
Minot	United States (North Dakota)	MOT	Minot International Airport	
Williston	United States (North Dakota)	ISN	Sloulin Field International Airport	
Akron/Canton	United States (Ohio)	CAK	Akron–Canton Regional Airport	
Cleveland	United States (Ohio)	CLE	Hopkins International Airport	
Columbus	United States (Ohio)	CMH	John Glenn Columbus International Airport	
Dayton	United States (Ohio)	DAY	Dayton International Airport	
Oklahoma City	United States (Oklahoma)	OKC	Will Rogers World Airport	
Tulsa	United States (Oklahoma)	TUL	Tulsa International Airport	
Medford	United States (Oregon)	MFR	Rogue Valley International–Medford Airport	
Erie	United States (Pennsylvania)	ERI	Erie International Airport	
Providence	United States (Rhode Island)	PVD	T. F. Green Airport	
Greenville/Spartanburg	United States (South Carolina)	GSP	Greenville–Spartanburg International Airport	
Rapid City	United States (South Dakota)	RAP	Rapid City Regional Airport	
Sioux Falls	United States (South Dakota)	FSD	Sioux Falls Regional Airport	
Knoxville	United States (Tennessee)	TYS	McGhee Tyson Airport	
Memphis	United States (Tennessee)	MEM	Memphis International Airport	
Amarillo	United States (Texas)	AMA	Rick Husband Amarillo International Airport	
El Paso	United States (Texas)	ELP	El Paso International Airport	
Lubbock	United States (Texas)	LBB	Lubbock Preston Smith International Airport	
Midland	United States (Texas)	MAF	Midland International Airport	
Houston	United States (Texas)	IAH	George Bush Intercontinental Airport	Hub
San Antonio	United States (Texas)	SAT	San Antonio International Airport	
Roanoke	United States (Virginia)	ROA	Roanoke Regional Airport	
Madison	United States (Wisconsin)	MSN	Dane County Regional Airport	
Green Bay	United States (Wisconsin)	GRB	Green Bay Austin Straubel International Airport	
Appleton	United States (Wisconsin)	ATW	Appleton International Airport	
Milwaukee	United States (Wisconsin)	MKE	Milwaukee Mitchell International Airport	
Casper	United States (Wyoming)	CPR	Casper–Natrona County International Airport	
Cody	United States (Wyoming)	COD	Yellowstone Regional Airport	
Toronto	Canada (Ontario)	YYZ	Lester Pearson International Airport	
Ottawa	Canada (Ontario)	YOW	Ottawa Macdonald–Cartier International Airport	Occasional
Montréal	Canada (Quebec)	YUL	Montréal–Trudeau International Airport	
Quebec City	Canada (Quebec)	YQB	Québec/Jean Lesage International Airport	
Guadalajara	Jalisco (Mexico)	GDL	Miguel Hidalgo y Costilla International Airport	
Zihuatanejo	Guerrero (Mexico)	ZIH	Aeropuerto Internacional de Zihuatanejo	
Mexico City	State of Mexico (Mexico)	MEX	Mexico City International Airport	
Puebla City	Puebla (Mexico)	PBC	Puebla International Airport	
Veracruz	Veracruz (Mexico)	VER	Aeropuerto Internacional de Veracruz	
Cancún	Cancun (Mexico)	CUN	Aeropuerto Internacional de Cancun	

== Fleet ==
Prior to its shutdown, the Trans States Airlines fleet consisted of the following aircraft:

Trans State Airlines Fleet
Aircraft	In service	Passengers	Operated For	Notes
Embraer ERJ 145	45	50	United Express	Most transferred to ExpressJet and then CommutAir.
Total	45			

=== Fleet development ===
In October 2009, Trans States Holdings announced an agreement to purchase 50 Mitsubishi MRJ90 with options for 50 more. Trans States Holdings held conversion rights to take the smaller, 76-seat MRJ70 instead of the 92-seat MRJ90 dependent on the scope clause environment by the time the airline took delivery. The order was cancelled as of October 2019 due to concerns that the Mitsubishi SpaceJet M90 aircraft violates the US Scope clause laws.

In April 2013, Trans States Airlines began taking delivery of six former Passaredo Linhas Aéreas ERJ-145s. In 2015 Trans States began parking their United Express ERJ 145ERs, in exchange for ERJ 145XRs transferred from ExpressJet.

=== Previously operated aircraft ===
Prior to becoming an all-jet airline, Trans States operated several different turboprop aircraft types including:

- ATR 42
- ATR 72
- BAe Jetstream 31
- BAe Jetstream 41
- Embraer EMB 120
- Fairchild Metroliner III

These propjet aircraft were operated in code share feeder services for American Airlines, Delta Air Lines, Trans World Airlines (TWA), USAir and US Airways.

== Accidents and incidents ==
- July 14, 2004 – Trans States Airlines Flight 3504, operated and marketed as a US Airways Express flight, overran the runway at Ottawa Macdonald–Cartier International Airport and sustained damage to the left inboard tire. There were no serious injuries. Transport Safety Board of Canada Accident Report
- June 16, 2010 – Trans States Airlines Flight 8050, operated and marketed as a United Express flight, overran the runway at Ottawa Macdonald–Cartier International Airport and sustained damage to the front of the aircraft with a nose gear collapse. Both pilots and one passenger sustained minor injuries.
- March 1, 2011 at 6:45 am EST – A US Airways Embraer ERJ 145 operated by Trans States Airlines was being pushed back from the gate at Bradley International Airport for a departure to Pittsburgh when the front nose gear collapsed and the front of the plane dropped to the tarmac. None of the 29 passengers were injured.
- September 4, 2011 – Trans States Airlines Flight 3363 originating from Chicago IL, operated as a United Express flight, left the runway during landing at Ottawa Macdonald–Cartier International Airport. The aircraft, with 44 passengers on board, sustained damage to the main gear and belly, as well as to the right wing. There were no injuries to passengers or crew.
- February 22, 2012 – Trans States Airlines operating as United Express Flight 3350 originating from Chicago O'Hare, IL to Rochester, NY was on approach to land but overran the end of the runway by about 50–75 feet and came to a stop with all gear off the paved surface. There were no injuries. The passengers disembarked via mobile stairs and were bussed to the terminal.
- August 7, 2018 – A Trans States Airlines Embraer ERJ 145 operating as Flight 4697 from Washington Dulles to Providence, RI was forced to divert to John F. Kennedy International Airport after reports of smoke in the cabin. The aircraft was evacuated on the runway. Three of the 53 passengers received treatment at the scene.

== See also ==
- List of defunct airlines of the United States
