= GoJet Airlines =

Regional airline of the United States

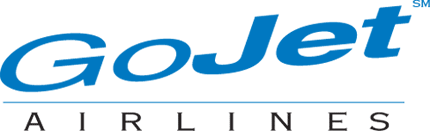

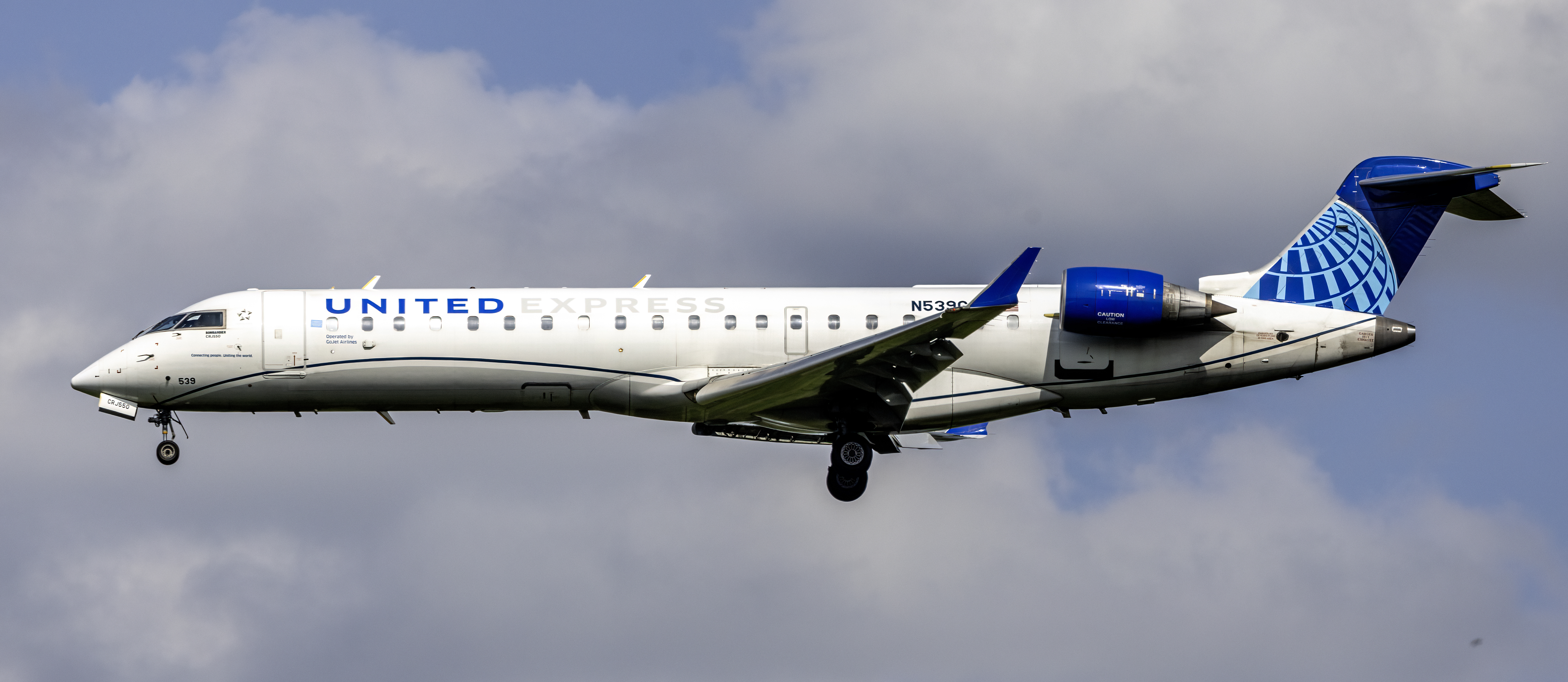
- United Express CRJ550 operated by GoJet Airlines
IATA	ICAO	Call sign
G7	GJS	LINDBERGH
- Founded: 2004; 22 years ago
- AOC #: N6WA249L
- Hubs: Chicago–O'Hare; Newark; Washington–Dulles; Houston
- Frequent-flyer program: Mileage Plus
- Alliance: Star Alliance (affiliate)
- Fleet size: 57
- Destinations: 80+
- Parent company: Trans States Holdings
- Headquarters: Bridgeton, Missouri, U.S.
- Key people: Hulas Kanodia (Owner); Rick Leach (President and CEO)
- Employees: 979 (2024)
- Website: www.gojetairlines.com

GoJet Airlines LLC is a regional airline headquartered in Bridgeton, Missouri, United States. Wholly owned by Trans States Holdings, it has 1,670 employees. It operates commuter feeder services under the United Express brand of United Airlines. United Express flights are currently operated out of United's hubs at Chicago–O'Hare, Newark and Washington-Dulles. GoJet's Delta Connection branded flights came to an end on March 31, 2020. Most of the flying at the end of the agreement was out of Detroit and Minneapolis–St. Paul as well as Raleigh–Durham International Airport. GoJet Airlines' system operations center (SOC), training center and corporate offices are co-located in the former Trans World Airlines and Ozark Airlines training center in Bridgeton, Missouri. The airline uses the former McDonnell Douglas factory hangar at Saint Louis Lambert International Airport as its primary maintenance facility, with maintenance staff available at all of the airline's destinations. Its call sign, "Lindbergh", is named for aviation pioneer Charles Lindbergh, who flew the Spirit of St. Louis solo across the Atlantic Ocean in 1927; the first person to do so.

== History ==
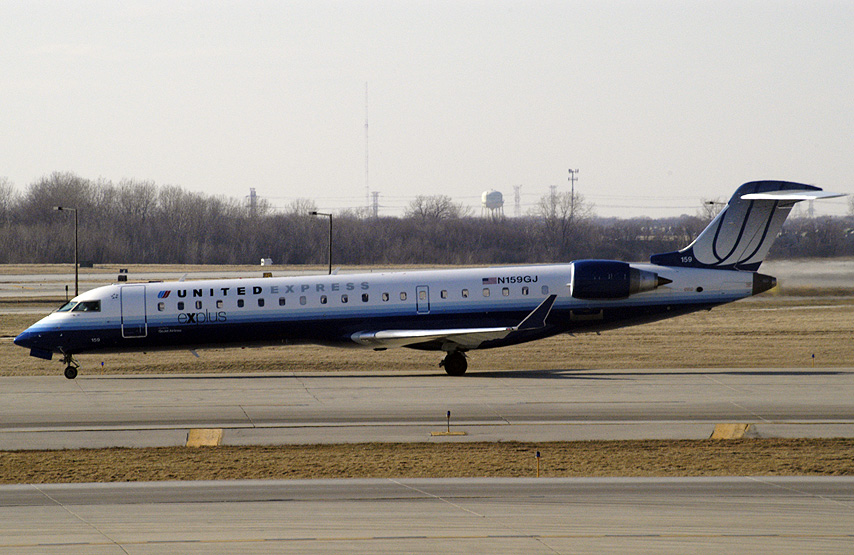
GoJet Airlines CRJ700 in previous United Express livery

The airline was established in late 2004 by Trans States Holdings. The airline would fly United Express-branded flights out of United Airlines' Chicago O’Hare hub to replace departing United Express carrier Atlantic Coast Airlines. GoJet took delivery of its first Bombardier CRJ700 in June, 2005.

The airline received its initial Air Carrier Operating Certificate in September 2005 and began scheduled passenger services on October 4, 2005, with a United Express flight from Cincinnati, Ohio to Chicago, Illinois. By the end of 2009, GoJet took delivery of its 25th CRJ700 aircraft.

In October, 2011, Delta Air Lines announced that it was planning a January, 2012 launch of new GoJet CRJ700 service as a Delta Connection regional carrier. Delta would initially transfer 15 of the CRJ700 aircraft previously assigned to its Comair division to GoJet, as well as 12 owned or leased CRJ700s contracted to SkyWest Airlines, to begin the service. On January 22, 2012, GoJet began service as a Delta Connection carrier with its inaugural flight from St. Louis, Missouri to Detroit, Michigan. In late 2013, GoJet agreed to increase its flying agreement for Delta by leasing several CRJ900 aircraft for its Delta Connection service through 2023. GoJet began this CRJ900 service in late 2014.

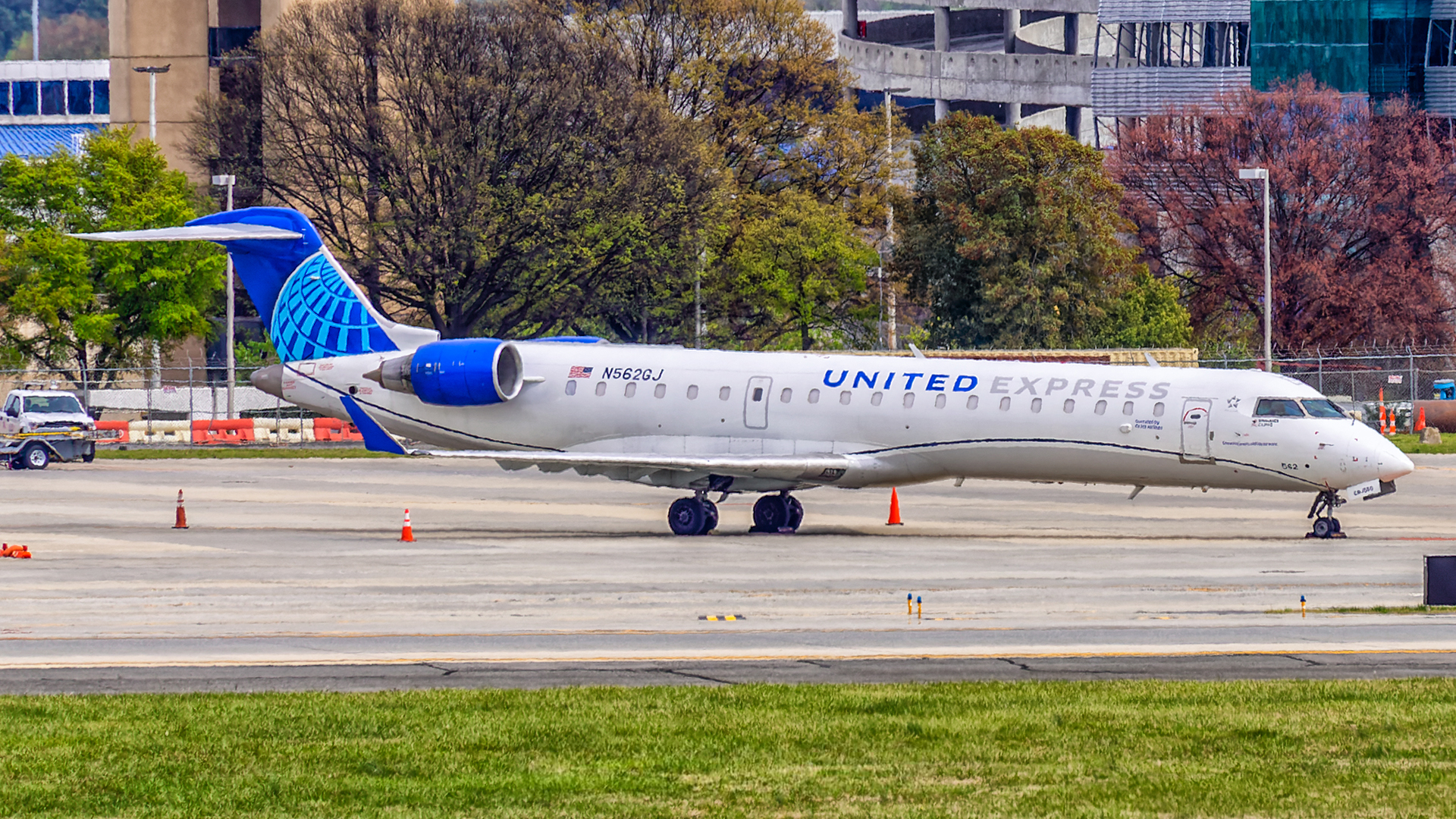
GoJet Airlines CRJ550 in United Express livery

In August, 2019, Delta announced that it would be terminating operating agreements with two of its Delta Connection-branded carriers: GoJet Airlines and Compass Airlines. The CRJ700 aircraft operated by GoJet for Delta Air Lines will be transferred to Endeavor Air or sold to other operators. The CRJ900 aircraft that were leased by GoJet for the Delta Connection brand were also eventually re-leased by other Delta Connection carriers. As part of the announcement, all GoJet operated flights on behalf of Delta Air Lines were phased out by mid-2020. After the COVID-19 pandemic nearly reduced travel demand to zero bookings Delta Air Lines and GoJet Airlines agreed to terminate service early and park all remaining Delta Connection aircraft on March 31, 2020.

In April, 2020 Trans States Holdings closed GoJet's two sister airlines, Trans States Airlines and Compass Airlines, due to challenging economic issues and an unsustainable business environment related to the COVID-19 pandemic.

== Crew bases ==
Pilots and flight attendants as well as maintenance personnel are based at the following locations:

- Chicago, Illinois (O'Hare International Airport)
- St. Louis, Missouri (St. Louis Lambert International Airport)
- Newark, New Jersey (Newark Liberty International Airport)
- Dulles, Virginia (Dulles International Airport)
- Houston, Texas (George Bush Intercontinental Airport)

== Destinations ==
GoJet flies to over 80 destinations within the United States and Canada, operating for United Express. Below are destinations per a 2024 route map.

List of destinations (As of 1 September 2017)
City	Country (Subdivision)	IATA	Airport	Notes
Jacksonville	United States (Florida)	JAX	Jacksonville International Airport	
Pensacola	United States (Florida)	PNS	Pensacola International Airport	
Sarasota/Bradenton	United States (Florida)	SRQ	Sarasota-Bradenton International Airport	
Atlanta	United States (Georgia)	ATL	Hartsfield-Jackson Atlanta International Airport	
Chicago	United States (Illinois)	ORD	O'Hare International Airport	Hub
Moline	United States (Illinois)	MLI	Quad City International Airport	
Indianapolis	United States (Indiana)	IND	Indianapolis International Airport	
Cedar Rapids	United States (Iowa)	CID	The Eastern Iowa Airport	
Des Moines	United States (Iowa)	DSM	Des Moines International Airport	
Wichita	United States (Kansas)	ICT	Wichita Eisenhower National Airport	
Louisville	United States (Kentucky)	SDF	Louisville International Airport	
New Orleans	United States (Louisiana)	MSY	Louis Armstrong New Orleans International Airport	
Portland	United States (Maine)	PWM	Portland International Jetport	
Nantucket	United States (Massachusetts)	ACK	Nantucket Memorial Airport	
Detroit	United States (Michigan)	DTW	Detroit Metropolitan Airport	
Grand Rapids	United States (Michigan)	GRR	Gerald R. Ford International Airport	
Kalamazoo	United States (Michigan)	AZO	Kalamazoo/Battle Creek International Airport	
Saginaw	United States (Michigan)	MBS	MBS International Airport	
Traverse City	United States (Michigan)	TVC	Cherry Capital Airport	
Minneapolis/St. Paul	United States (Minnesota)	MSP	Minneapolis-Saint Paul International Airport	
Kansas City	United States (Missouri)	MCI	Kansas City International Airport	
Springfield/Branson	United States (Missouri)	SGF	Springfield–Branson National Airport	
St. Louis	United States (Missouri)	STL	Lambert-Saint Louis International Airport	HQ
Omaha	United States (Nebraska)	OMA	Eppley Airfield	
Manchester	United States (New Hampshire)	MHT	Manchester-Boston Regional Airport	
Newark	United States (New Jersey)	EWR	Newark Liberty International Airport	Hub
Albuquerque	United States (New Mexico)	ABQ	Albuquerque International Sunport	
Albany	United States (New York)	ALB	Albany International Airport	
Buffalo	United States (New York)	BUF	Buffalo Niagara International Airport	
Elmira	United States (New York)	ELM	Elmira/Corning Regional Airport	
Rochester	United States (New York)	ROC	Greater Rochester International Airport	
Greensboro	United States (North Carolina)	GSO	Piedmont Triad International Airport	
Cincinnati, Ohio area	United States (Kentucky)	CVG	Cincinnati/Northern Kentucky International Airport	Airport is in Kentucky
Cleveland	United States (Ohio)	CLE	Cleveland Hopkins International Airport	
Dayton	United States (Ohio)	DAY	Dayton International Airport	
Oklahoma City	United States (Oklahoma)	OKC	Will Rogers World Airport	
Tulsa	United States (Oklahoma)	TUL	Tulsa International Airport	
Bozeman	United States (Montana)	BZN	Bozeman Yellowstone International Airport	
Missoula	United States (Montana)	MSO	Missoula International Airport	
Allentown	United States (Pennsylvania)	ABE	Lehigh Valley International Airport	
Harrisburg	United States (Pennsylvania)	MDT	Harrisburg International Airport	
Wilkes-Barre/Scranton	United States (Pennsylvania)	AVP	Wilkes-Barre/Scranton International Airport	
State College	United States (Pennsylvania)	SCE	State College Regional Airport	
Philadelphia	United States (Pennsylvania)	PHL	Philadelphia International Airport	
Pittsburgh	United States (Pennsylvania)	PIT	Pittsburgh International Airport	
Rapid City	United States (South Dakota)	RAP	Rapid City Regional Airport	
Knoxville	United States (Tennessee)	TYS	McGhee Tyson Airport	
Nashville	United States (Tennessee)	BNA	Nashville International Airport	
Austin	United States (Texas)	AUS	Austin-Bergstrom International Airport	
Dallas–Fort Worth	United States (Texas)	DFW	Dallas/Fort Worth International Airport	
El Paso	United States (Texas)	ELP	El Paso International Airport	
San Antonio	United States (Texas)	SAT	San Antonio International Airport	
Burlington	United States (Vermont)	BTV	Burlington International Airport	
Richmond	United States (Virginia)	RIC	Richmond International Airport	
Washington, D.C. area	United States (Virginia)	IAD	Washington Dulles International Airport	Hub
Madison	United States (Wisconsin)	MSN	Dane County Regional Airport	
Montréal	Canada (Quebec)	YUL	Montréal-Pierre Elliott Trudeau International Airport	
Toronto	Canada (Ontario)	YYZ	Toronto Pearson International Airport	

== Fleet ==
=== Current fleet ===
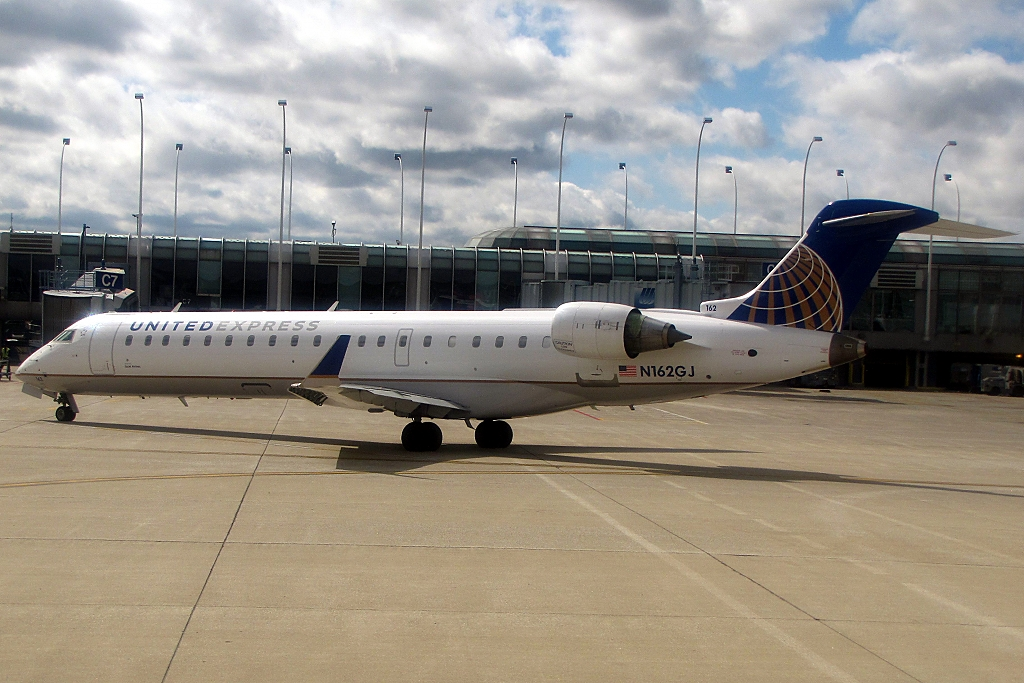
United Express CRJ700 operated by GoJet Airlines at O'Hare International Airport. It would later be converted into a CRJ550.

As of August 2025, the GoJet Airlines fleet consists of the following aircraft:

Aircraft	In Service	Orders	Passengers				Operated For	Notes
Aircraft	In Service	Orders	F	Y+	Y	Total	Operated For	Notes
Bombardier CRJ550	57		10	20	20	50	United Express	10 parked
Total	57	0						

The GoJet fleet of CRJ550's that are flown for United Express are equipped with engines like those on the rest of the Bombardier CRJ700 series: General Electric CF34. All of these aircraft are being converted to CRJ550s (see below). GoJet operated CRJ900 aircraft from 2014 to 2020 that it leased as a former Delta Air Lines commuter partner. At the beginning of April 2020, GoJet stopped flying the CRJ900 when the company completed its service contract with Delta Air Lines.

=== Fleet development ===
On February 6, 2019, United Airlines and Bombardier Aviation announced that GoJet would be the first regional carrier to operate the CRJ550: a 50-seat conversion of the CRJ700. In February 2020 United Airlines ordered 20 more CRJ550 aircraft for the GoJet Fleet, to be delivered through 2021. These aircraft will be transferred from other United Express carriers to GoJet. Once these CRJ700 aircraft are replaced by the 50-seat, converted aircraft (see below), the CRJ550 fleet at GoJet will total 74 aircraft.

=== CRJ550 ===
The United Express CRJ550 is a modified Bombardier CRJ700 aircraft. Bombardier Aviation did not produce the CRJ550 new from the factory. Many CRJ550 aircraft in the GoJet fleet are several years old, the oldest (N503GJ) being close to 20 years old. CRJ550 conversions are done on both the original CRJ700 and the NextGen CRJ700 models. The process of converting the aircraft cabin is a relatively quick process whereby several economy seats of the 700 series are removed and replaced with large storage cabinets, a larger more modern service galley and updated First Class and Economy Plus seating. The four new cabinets installed at floor level allow passengers to stow larger carry-on luggage in the cabin with them that would normally have needed to be checked planeside when on the CRJ700. The new, larger service galley allows passengers with first class seats the option to self-serve snacks and non-alcoholic beverages during the flight, particularly when the aircraft’s single flight attendant is serving the main cabin. The galley features a lighted glass cabinet with several snack options, a refrigerator with chilled non-alcoholic beverages, ice and bottled water drawers as well as a waste receptacle. For the cabin crew, the new galley features a storage area for crew luggage. In the cabin, the aircraft features 10 full-size First Class seats, 20 Economy Plus seats and 20 Economy seats. The whole aircraft receives new wall panels, carpeting, curtains and signage. United is having all the CRJ550 aircraft painted in its new blue and white livery. For pilots, the aircraft is essentially a CRJ700 with limited takeoff and landing weights, in order to meet the United Airlines "scope clause" agreement with its pilots who are represented by the Airline Pilots Association. This agreement limits the CRJ550 to a maximum takeoff weight of 65,000 pounds: 10,000 pounds less than the CRJ700. Because of this restriction, the CRJ550 is sometimes unable to take full passenger loads when flying into areas where precautionary fuel is needed, such as areas with poor weather.

=== Fleet Exits ===
In September 2024, aircraft N558GJ, was the first frame removed from United Airlines registration and operated by GoJet. The frame has been transferred to SkyWest who will begin CRJ-550 operations for United in December 2024, with at least eleven frames.

As of March 4, 2026, SkyWest’s fleet for United Express has eleven CRJ-550s that have registrations ending with “GJ.” These frames were part of the initial start of SkyWest CRJ-550 operations. GoJet is sitting at 54 frames, while SkyWest has 31, with additional frames in conversion.

== Accidents ==
- On February 12, 2025, United Express flight 4427 operated by GoJet Airlines slid off a taxiway while landing at St. Louis Lambert International Airport. No injuries were reported among the 27 people on board including crew. Runway 11-29 was temporarily closed after the incident before later reopening.

== See also ==
- Air transportation in the United States
