= Compass Airlines (North America) =

United States regional airline (2006–2020)

IATA	ICAO	Call sign
CP	CPZ	COMPASS
- Founded: September 28, 2006
- Commenced operations: May 2, 2007
- Ceased operations: April 5, 2020
- AOC #: C77A868L
- Hubs: Detroit; Los Angeles; Memphis (2006–2013); Minneapolis/St. Paul; Seattle/Tacoma
- Frequent-flyer program: AAdvantage (American); SkyMiles (Delta); WorldPerks (Northwest)
- Alliance: Oneworld (American); SkyTeam (Delta/Northwest)
- Parent company: Northwest Airlines (2006–2008); Delta Air Lines (2008–2010); Trans States Holdings (2010–2020)
- Headquarters: Minneapolis–Saint Paul International Airport, Fort Snelling, Minnesota, United States
- Key people: Rick Leach (president & CEO)

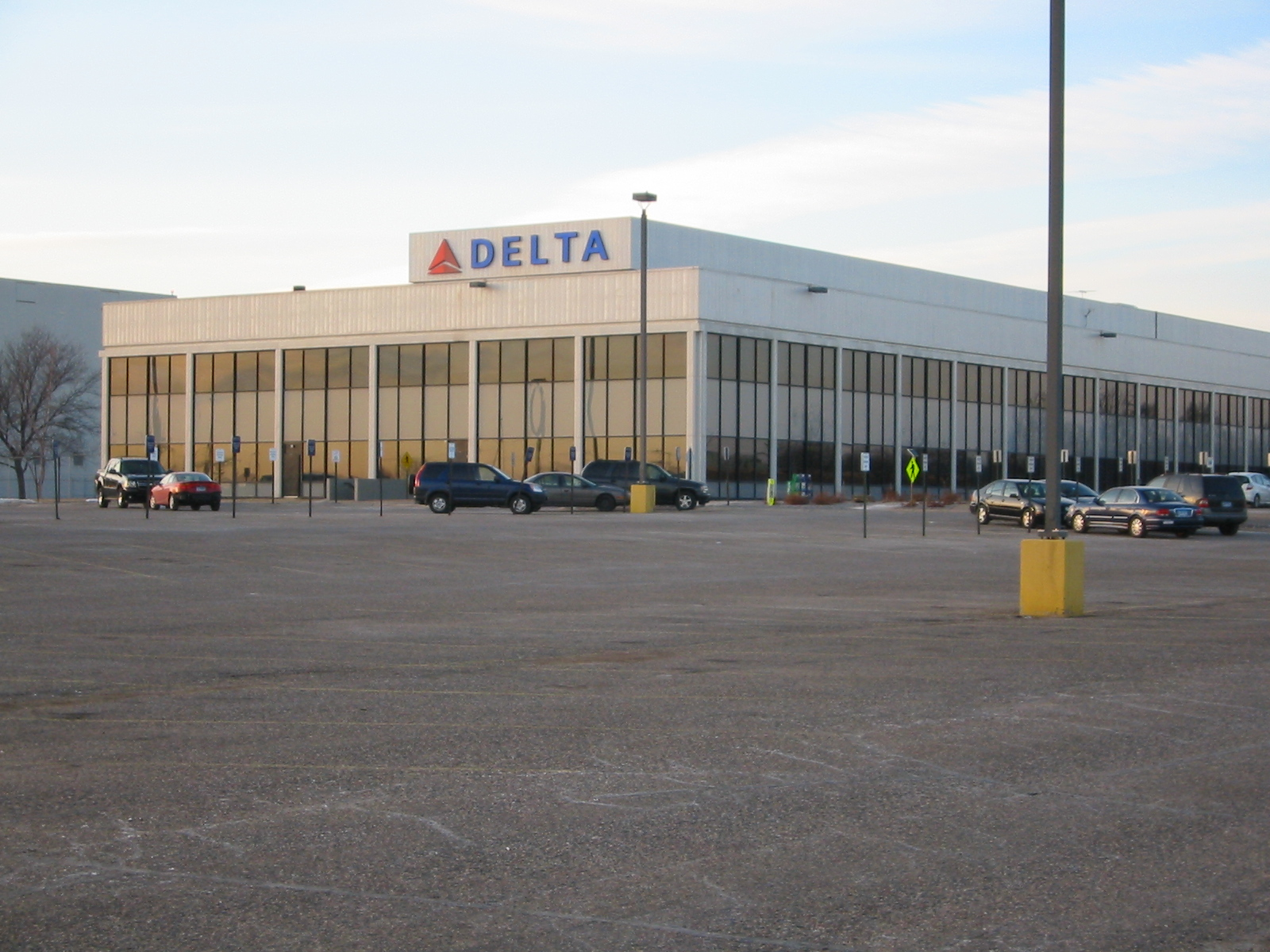
The company headquarters, Delta Air Lines Building C at Minneapolis–Saint Paul International Airport.

Compass Airlines, LLC was a regional airline in the United States that operated from 2006 to 2020, when it shut down due to the COVID-19 pandemic. It was headquartered in Delta Air Lines Building C at Minneapolis–Saint Paul International Airport in Fort Snelling, Hennepin County, Minnesota; prior to December 16, 2009, it was headquartered in unincorporated Fairfax County, Virginia, United States, east of the Chantilly CDP. The airline launched inaugural service with a single Bombardier CRJ200 aircraft under the Northwest Airlink brand between Minneapolis/St. Paul and Washington, D.C., on May 2, 2007. On August 21, 2007, it began flying two Embraer 175 76-passenger aircraft, and expanded to 36 aircraft by December 2008.

Formerly a wholly owned subsidiary of Northwest Airlines and later Delta Air Lines, in July 2010, the company was sold to Trans States Holdings. At the time, Compass was the only remaining airline of the former Northwest Airlines Group.

During its 14-year history, Compass Airlines operated over 1.5 million flights. In 2016, at its peak, Compass operated 62 aircraft and employed just over 2,000 employees.

Compass ceased operations on April 5, 2020, citing reduced travel demand stemming from the COVID-19 pandemic, along with their ownership's failed attempts to secure additional flying. The airline ceased operations within a week after their sister-company, Trans States Airlines, leaving GoJet Airlines as the sole airline operated by Trans States Holdings.

== History ==
Compass Airlines was a regional airline formed as a result of a contract dispute between Northwest Airlines and its pilots' union, the Air Line Pilots Association (ALPA). The Northwest Airlines pilot group was asked to give relief on a section of their collective bargaining agreement governing "scope", which protects pilot jobs by ensuring that an airline's customers are flown by the employees of that airline. The pilots eventually agreed to a concession on the scope of their contract allowing a limited number of 76-seat aircraft to be flown by outsourced pilots working for a subcontractor regional airline. In exchange for their concession the Northwest Airlines pilots demanded in return that the pilots of these new aircraft would eventually "flow-up" into mainline pilot jobs at Northwest Airlines and that Northwest Airlines pilots would retain the ability to "flow-down" into the newly subcontracted pilot jobs in the event that Northwest Airlines were to furlough the mainline pilots.

In order to adapt to the agreement, and fulfill a need to serve the regional markets with smaller, more efficient aircraft and a dramatically reduced wage labor force, Northwest bought the operating certificate of bankrupt Independence Air on March 10, 2006, for $2 million. During the concept phase, the subsidiary was known as "NewCo". Compass' operations were limited to 76-seat aircraft or less, due to the language in the pilot contract at the mainline carrier.

On September 28, 2006, Compass Airlines officially received approval from the United States Department of Transportation to begin operations. On April 5, 2007, Compass Airlines received FAA certification to begin commercial passenger operations with a single CRJ200 (N601XJ).

On May 2, 2007, the airline had its first revenue flight from Washington Dulles International Airport to Minneapolis−Saint Paul International Airport, which maintained the operating certificate. Compass implemented Embraer operations on August 21, 2007.

On July 1, 2010, Delta Air Lines announced that it sold Compass Airlines to Trans States Holdings for US$20.5 million. Despite the change in ownership, Compass still shared many things with its former parents, including being headquartered in a Delta-owned building, and a logo that was a modified version of the final Northwest Airlines logo.

On March 27, 2015, the airline began flying one of twenty brand new Embraer 175, operating for American Airlines under the American Eagle brand, with the initial flight being from Los Angeles International Airport to Houston Intercontinental Airport.

In August 2019, Delta Air Lines made the decision to reduce the number of regional carriers that fly under the Delta Connection brand and terminated its agreement for regional flying with Compass Airlines. This resulted in the removal of 36 aircraft from the airline and reduced the number of aircraft flying for Compass Airlines from 56 to 20 by June 2020. This schedule was later accelerated to remove all Delta-owned Embraer 175s from the Compass operation by April 1, 2020.

Compass had maintenance bases in Phoenix, San Jose, Los Angeles, San Francisco, and Seattle/Tacoma prior to its closure.

In January 2020, Compass announced that it would be closing its Phoenix crew base. The following month, the airline announced in a memo to employees that its Seattle-Tacoma crew base would also be closing.

In March 2020, due to the reduction in demand in response to the COVID-19 pandemic, Compass announced it would cease operations on April 7. The final revenue flight operated by Compass was American Eagle Flight 6047 from Tulsa, Oklahoma to Los Angeles, California on April 5, 2020.

The airline had originally planned to be acquired by Breeze Airways. The acquisition was later canceled.

== Labor relations ==
Both the pilot and flight attendant groups were unionized, with pilots being represented by the Air Line Pilots Association, and flight attendants represented by the Association of Flight Attendants.

The flight attendants negotiated and approved a five-year contract with the company on May 1, 2013, following a failed vote on a tentative agreement in late 2011. The new contract gave employees pay increases, a larger 401(k) match, a signing bonus, and other working condition improvements.

On August 25, 2010, Compass Airlines fired a flight attendant after she appeared on a local television program admitting publicly that she qualified for food stamps, even though she was a full-time employee of the airline.

== Fleet ==
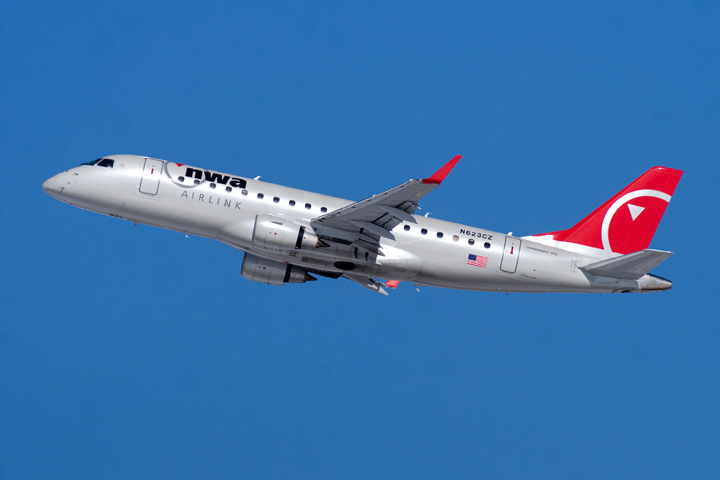
Former Northwest Airlink Embraer 175 operated by Compass Airlines

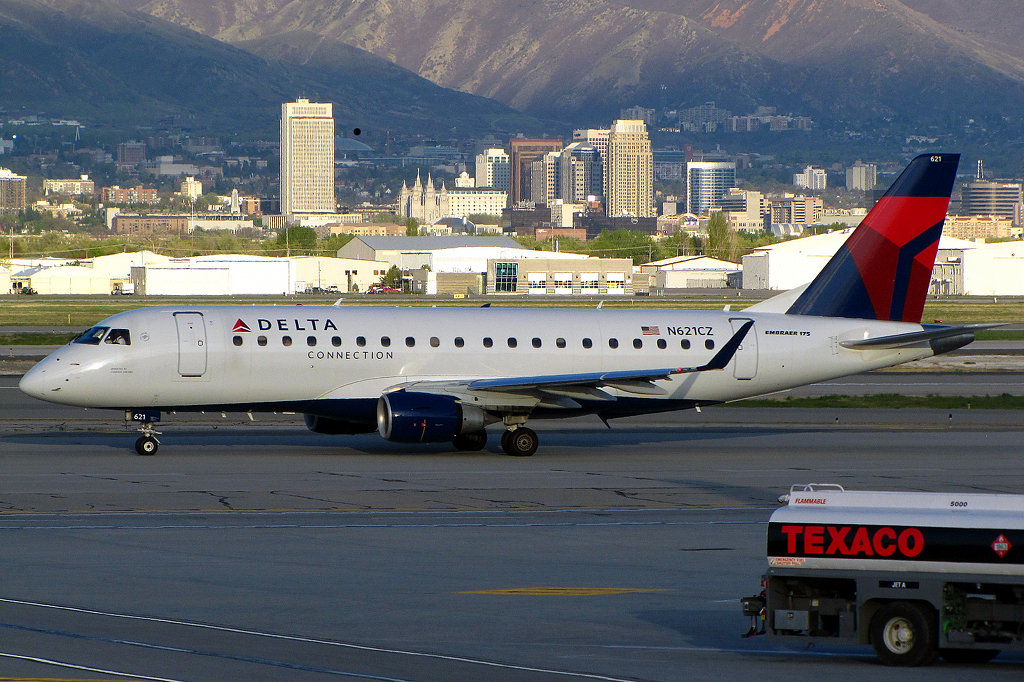
Delta Connection Embraer 175 operated by Compass Airlines

Prior to its shutdown, the Compass Airlines fleet consisted of the following aircraft:

Aircraft	Total	Orders	Seating				Notes
Aircraft	Total	Orders	F	E+	Y	Total	Notes
Embraer 175	36	—	12	20	44	76	Operated as Northwest Airlink and later as Delta Connection. Under lease from Delta Air Lines, and later placed with SkyWest Airlines (10) and Republic Airways (26).
Embraer 175	20	—	12	20	44	76	Operated as American Eagle, under lease from American Airlines Group. All aircraft were placed into storage upon closure, to later be placed with Envoy Air.
Total	56	—					

All Embraer 170 & 175 aircraft were WiFi-equipped, powered by GoGo Inflight, featuring streaming internet and inflight entertainment.

All Northwest-owned Embraer 175s were delivered with some structural modifications to enable an upgrade to an Embraer 175AR (Advanced Range) model. The Northwest aircraft also featured the structural support for the installation of a Heads-up display, however this equipment was never installed. Unique to the North American market, these E175s were certified with a MGTOW of 89,000 lbs, as was allowed by the Northwest Airlines pilot scope clause, at the time of purchase. Additionally, they also featured non-standard cabin furnishings, such as additional galley storage and two-additional cabin jumpseats, to facilitate commuting employees and Flight Attendant training and checking.

=== Historic fleet ===
Throughout its history, Compass Airlines also operated the following aircraft:

Aircraft	Total	Orders	Passengers				Notes
Aircraft	Total	Orders	F	Y+	Y	Total	Notes
Embraer 170	6	0	9	12	48	69	Acquired from Virgin Blue. Operated as Delta Connection. Under lease from Delta Air Lines, and later placed with Republic Airways.
Bombardier CRJ200	1	0	0	0	50	50	Operated as Northwest Airlink, under lease from Mesaba Airlines.
Total	7	0					

== Incidents ==
- On May 8, 2008, Compass Airlines Flight 2040 bound for Regina, Saskatchewan from Minneapolis/St Paul with 74 passengers and four crew on board was forced to land in Fargo, North Dakota after a fire broke out in the restroom. The plane landed at 11:00 pm; no injuries to passengers were reported. A week after the incident, a 19-year-old flight attendant was charged with starting the fire. He pleaded not guilty, but before trial, he fled to Mexico. He was arrested in Mexico April 5, 2011, and was extradited to the US to stand trial. He was sentenced to seven years in prison on December 16, 2011.
- On November 15, 2010, Compass Airlines Flight 5887 bound for Missoula, Montana from Minneapolis/St Paul with 76 passengers and four crew on board was forced to return to Minneapolis after the aircraft received substantial damage when it collided with a flock of birds. The plane landed 22 minutes after departure; no injuries to passengers were reported.

== See also ==
- List of defunct airlines of the United States
