= Trans States Holdings =

Airline holding company of the United States

- Company type: Private company
- Industry: Aviation
- Founded: 1982 as Resort Air
- Headquarters: Bridgeton, Missouri, United States
- Key people: Hulas Kanodia (Chairman & CEO); Richard A. Leach (President)
- Subsidiaries: GoJet Airlines
- Website: TransStates.net

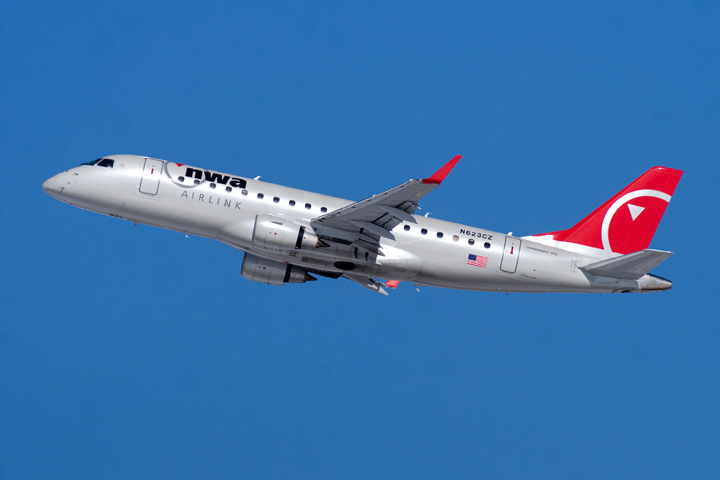
A Compass Airlines ERJ-175

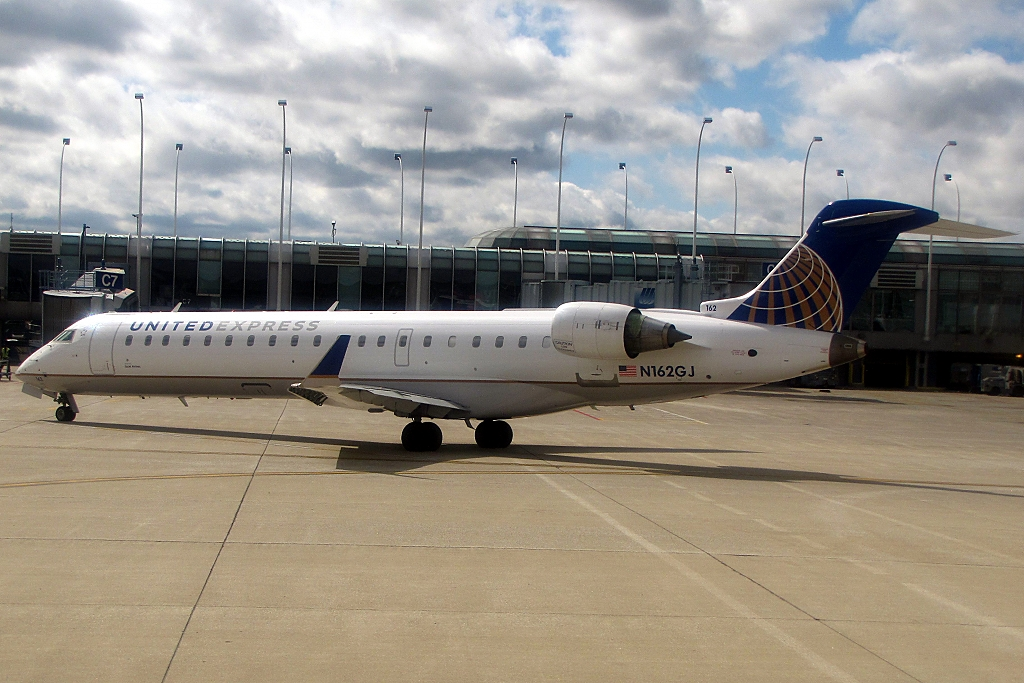
A GoJet CRJ-700

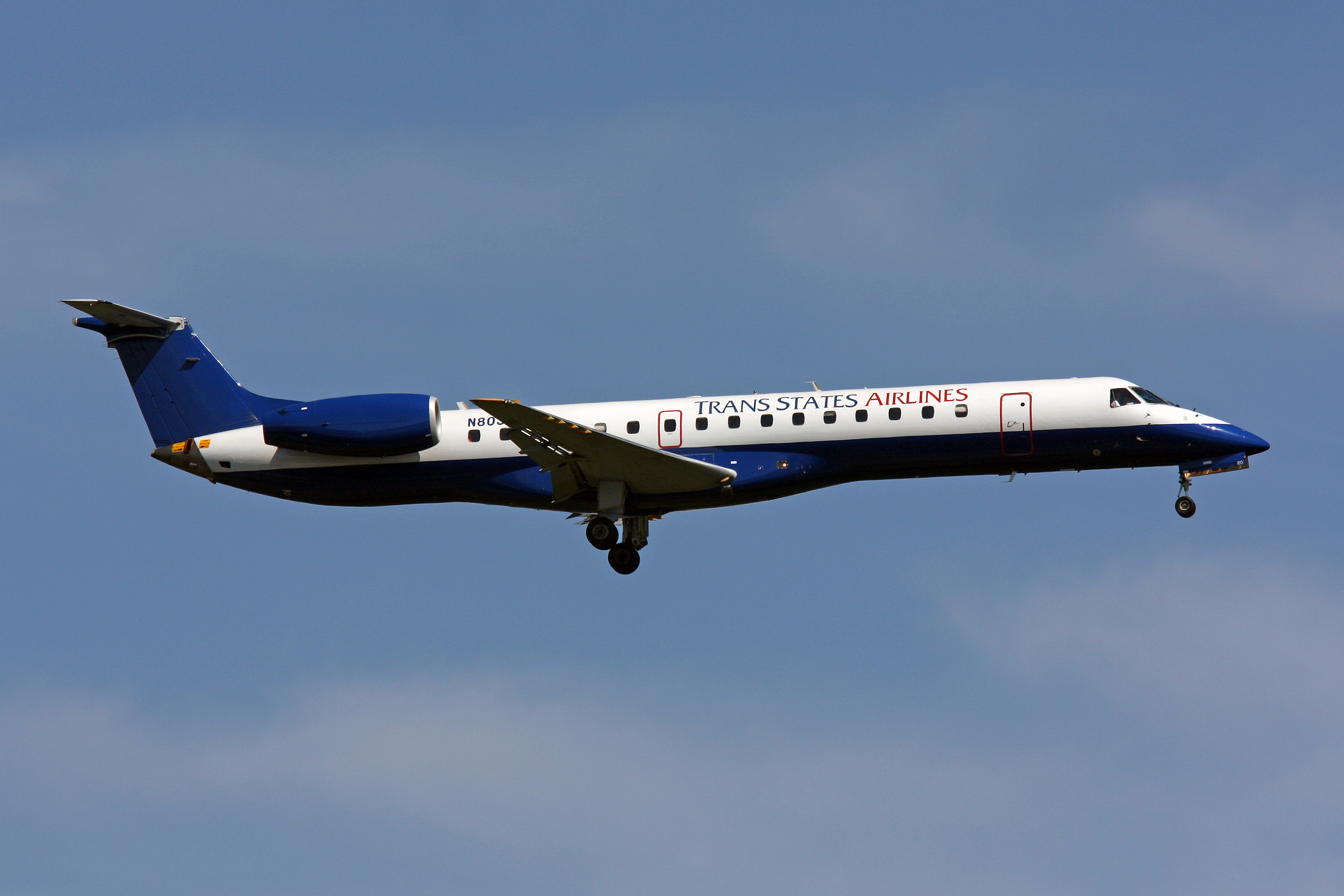
A Trans States Airlines ERJ-145

Trans States Holdings, Inc. is a privately owned airline holding company in the United States, which owns and operates GoJet Airlines. The holding company is headquartered in Bridgeton, Missouri near St. Louis Lambert International Airport. The holding company formerly owned and operated Trans States Airlines and Compass Airlines until their cessation of operations on April 1, 2020, and April 5, 2020, respectively.

== History ==
Trans States Airlines was originally formed in 1982 as Resort Air, entering into an agreement with Trans World Airlines to operate feeder services in the states of Missouri and Illinois under the Trans World Express brand name. In 1989 the company changed its name to Trans States Airlines. GoJet Airlines was formed in 2005 by Trans States Holdings to operate feeder service for United Airlines under the United Express brand name using a fleet of Bombardier CRJ700 70–seat regional jets. In July 2010, Delta Air Lines sold Compass Airlines to Trans States Holdings as part of a cost reduction scheme, which included the sale of Mesaba Airlines to the Pinnacle Airlines Corp. at the same time.

Due to the economic effects of the COVID-19 pandemic, Trans States Holdings announced in March 2020 that Trans States Airlines would cease operations and close down on April 1, 2020, and Compass Airlines would also cease operations and close down on April 5, 2020, leaving GoJet Airlines as their only operating airline. Their maintenance hangar at Louisville Muhammad Ali International Airport also closed in April 2020.

== Fleet ==
As of November 2025, Trans States Holdings operated an all-narrow-body regional jet fleet, totaling 60 aircraft.

Aircraft	In Service	Orders	Passengers				Operated by	Operated for	Notes
Aircraft	In Service	Orders	F	Y+	Y	Total	Operated by	Operated for	Notes
Bombardier CRJ550	55	(5)	10	20	20	50	GoJet Airlines	United Express	
Bombardier CRJ700	(5)	—	N/A				GoJet Airlines		Being converted to Bombardier CRJ550.
Total	60	(5)							

Trans States Holdings has operated a variety of turbo-prop aircraft since its inception, but has operated an all-regional jet fleet since 2006.

Former Fleet
Aircraft	Operated	Reference
Fairchild Swearingen Metro II	1985–2006 (no later than)	
Fairchild Swearingen Metro III	1985–2006 (no later than)	
ATR 42	1986–2003	
Jetstream J32	1989–2000	
Embraer EMB 120 Brasilia	1991–1995	
ATR 72	1991–2003	
British Aerospace Advanced Turbo Prop	1993–2006 (no later than)	
BAe Jetstream J41	1995–2006	
Bombardier CRJ200	2007	
