= RPS =

RPS may refer to:

== Societies ==
- Royal Pharmaceutical Society, in the United Kingdom
- Royal Philharmonic Society, in the United Kingdom
- Royal Photographic Society, in the United Kingdom
- Racial Preservation Society, a defunct British pressure group

== Schools ==
- Ralston Public Schools
- Regina Public Schools
- Revere Public Schools
- Ridgewood Preparatory School
- Rutgers Preparatory School, New Jersey, US

== Groups ==
- Reform Party of Syria
- Rajasthan Police Service, India
- Swedish National Police Board (Swedish: Rikspolisstyrelsen)

== Measures ==
- Requests per second, a measure of resource use
- Rounds per second, the rate of fire of a firearm
- Revolutions per second

== Systems ==
- Reactor Protective System, of a nuclear power plant
- Radioisotope Power System, or Radioisotope thermoelectric generator, of a spacecraft

== Companies and organizations ==
- Roadway Package System, a package delivery company which became FedEx Ground
- RPS Group, a consultancy in the United Kingdom

== Sports ==
- Rising Pune Supergiant, a now-defunct Indian cricket team

== Games and gaming ==
- Rock paper scissors, a hand game
  - Rock paper scissors (disambiguation)
- Rock Paper Shotgun, a UK video game website

== Other uses ==
- Real People Slash, a type of real person fiction
- Receive packet steering of computing interrupts
- Record of Protected Structures under the Irish Planning and Development Act 2000
- Regulated Product Submissions, a US health standard
- Renewable portfolio standard of energy
- Republic of the Philippines Ship, a prefix formerly used by ships of the Philippine Navy
- Resistive pulse sensing, a laboratory technique
- Roket Pengorbit Satelit, RPS-01, an Indonesian satellite launcher family
- Rotational Position Sensing on IBM CKD Direct access storage devices (DASD)

== See also ==
- RP (disambiguation), for the singular of RPs
