= Republic Airlines (disambiguation) =

Republic Airlines and Republic Airways and similar may mean:

- Republic Airways Inc., operating as Republic Airways, a regional airline subsidiary of Republic Airways Holdings; formerly known as "Republic Airline"
- Republic Airways Holdings, Inc., an American airline holding corporation based in Indianapolis, Indiana
- Republic Airlines (IATA: RC, ICAO: REP, Call sign: REPUBLIC) was a United States airline formed by the merger of North Central Airlines and Southern Airways on July 1, 1979
