= Frontier Airlines Holdings =

American airline holding company

Frontier Airlines Holdings, Inc.
- Type: Airline Holding Company
- Industry: Transportation
- Founded: April 3, 2006
- Defunct: October 1, 2009
- Fate: Acquired
- Successor: Republic Airways Holdings
- Headquarters: United States
- Products: Airline Services

Frontier Airlines Holdings, Inc. was a United States-based airline holding company. The company has headquarters in Denver, Colorado.

== Airline Holdings ==
=== Airline divisions and operations ===
- Frontier Airlines
- Lynx Aviation

=== Airline related divisions and operations ===
- Frontier Express

Frontier Airlines Holdings	IATA:	ICAO:	Call Sign:	Airline or contracted regional airline operating flights for or flying in brand colors of:	Codeshares with, flight numbers ranging:	Number and type of aircraft	Number of Seats:
Frontier Airlines	F9	FFT	FRONTIER FLIGHT	Frontier Airlines	Great Lakes (ZK) 5001 - 5999; Lynx Aviation (L4) 3001 - 3999	09 Airbus A318-110; 39 Airbus A319-100; 04 Airbus A320-200	120; 132 - 136; 162
Lynx Aviation	L4	SSX	SHASTA	Frontier Airlines Operated by Lynx Aviation		11 Bombardier Q400 (+10 options)	70-74 (70 in aircraft with ski bins)

== History ==
The company was formed from a reorganization of Frontier Airlines on April 3, 2006. Frontier created Frontier Airlines Holdings, Inc., a holding company incorporated in Delaware to take advantage of favorable tax law of "Delaware General Corporation Law" in that state. The new corporate headquarters was located in Colorado.

On September 6, 2006, Frontier Holdings announced that a new division known as Lynx Aviation, would operate 10 Bombardier Q400 aircraft beginning in May 2007 as Frontier Express. Service with the Q400's has been rescheduled to begin on October 1, 2007. The 'Lynx' name plays off of the tail pictures of its planes, specifically Larry the Lynx, and the fact that it "links" smaller airports to the main Denver hub. One reason for the change is to help reduce costs; the company hopes the change will allow Frontier Airlines to cut costs on routes 650 miles or shorter by 30%, allowing entry into new markets. by paying employees less.

On April 11, 2008, Frontier Airlines Holdings announced that it and all of its subsidiaries has filed for bankruptcy due to its credit card processor withholding payment from ticket sales.

On August 4, 2008, Frontier Airlines Holdings, Inc. announced it was moving forward with an alternate transaction for post-petition debtor-in-possession (DIP) financing. Republic Airways Holdings, Inc., Credit Suisse Securities (through its affiliates), and AQR Capital offered Frontier up to $75 million in DIP financing, with an immediate firm commitment and funding of $30 million. This new DIP facility provides Frontier with lower financing costs, less restrictive covenants and greater flexibility to pursue strategic opportunities without being constrained by more restrictive DIP provisions. The alternate DIP facility is subject to bankruptcy court approval and to various conditions.

The Bankruptcy Court confirmed Frontier's reorganization plan on September 10, 2009, and Frontier emerged from Chapter 11 on October 1, 2009 as a wholly owned subsidiary of Republic Airways Holdings.
