= Republic Airways Holdings =

Airline holding company

Republic Airways Holdings Inc.
- Type: Public
- Traded as: Nasdaq: RJET
- Industry: Transportation
- Founded: 1973; 53 years ago
- Headquarters: Carmel, Indiana, United States
- Area served: North America
- Key people: David Grizzle (CEO & Chairman); Matt Koscal (President)
- Owner: American Airlines Group (20.8%); United Airlines (18.2%); Delta Air Lines (14.4%)
- Number of employees: 8,000+ (including subsidiaries)
- Subsidiaries: Mesa Airlines; Republic Airways; LIFT Academy
- Website: rjet.com

Republic Airways Holdings Inc. is an American airline holding company based in Carmel, Indiana. The company owns two regional airlines, Mesa Airlines and Republic Airways. Together the two airlines operate the world's largest fleet of Embraer 170 and Embraer 175 aircraft. The majority of the shares of company are owned by the mainline carriers that contract with Republic, American Airlines Group, Delta Air Lines, and United Airlines.

== History ==
=== Forming the holding company ===
The company traces its roots to Chautauqua Airlines, founded in 1973 in Jamestown, New York, by Joel and Gloria Hall. Joel had been a pilot for Mohawk Airlines. Chautauqua was one of the first airlines to fly under code shares, initially with Allegheny Airlines which later became US Airways.

In 1988, an affiliate of Guarantee Security Life Insurance Company bought the airline. Three years later, the Florida Department of Insurance took over the insurance company and its airline subsidiary after the insurance company was declared insolvent.

In 1994, Chautauqua swapped routes with Jetstream International which had been owned by USAir. Chautauqua then moved its headquarters to Indianapolis.

In 1998, the company formally organized as a holding company, with Chautauqua as its only subsidiary. The holding company capitalized on the name Republic from Republic Airlines of the 1980s because it had better national recognition than Chautauqua. However, the earlier Republic Airlines has no historic ties to the new company other than the name.

Wexford Management of Greenwich, Connecticut, an investment company, bought the holding company on May 15, 1998. Wexford had already owned National Airlines and was also invested heavily in Midway Airlines. Wexford’s interest in distressed airline firms dates back to 1995 when the assets of MarkAir were purchased in a bankruptcy auction.

Republic Airways Holdings incorporated a new subsidiary, "Republic Airline, Inc." (sic), in 1999, but the subsidiary was left as a "shell" company until 2004.

On May 26, 2004, an IPO was launched on NASDAQ under the ticker symbol RJET with Wexford Capital remaining the majority shareholder.

==== Bankruptcy ====
On February 25, 2016, Republic Airways Holdings Inc filed for bankruptcy protection because of plunging profits, a pilot shortage, and a loss of revenue during the past several quarters associated with grounding aircraft.

Republic Airways Holdings Inc., announced that it had emerged from bankruptcy protection on April 30, 2017.

=== Scope clauses ===
In 2004, the holding company activated Republic Airline in reaction to a pilots' suit against American Airlines. American had awarded the flying of 44-seat regional jets to Chautauqua, then the main operating subsidiary of Republic Airways Holdings. However, Chautauqua later started to operate 70-seat regional jets on behalf of another major airline, and this caused American to be in violation of its pilot union scope clause, which prevented another airline from operating on behalf of American if that airline was operating jet aircraft of more than 50 seats, even if such aircraft were operating on behalf of a carrier other than American. To repair the situation, Republic Airways Holdings activated Republic Airline, and upon Part 121 certification in 2005 allowing Republic Airways to operate commercial service. Republic Airways Holdings then transferred the offending 70-seat regional jets from Chautauqua to Republic Airlines. American was thereby no longer in violation of its pilot union scope clause. Republic Airways Holdings paid US$6.6 million to the Allied Pilots Association to settle the issue.

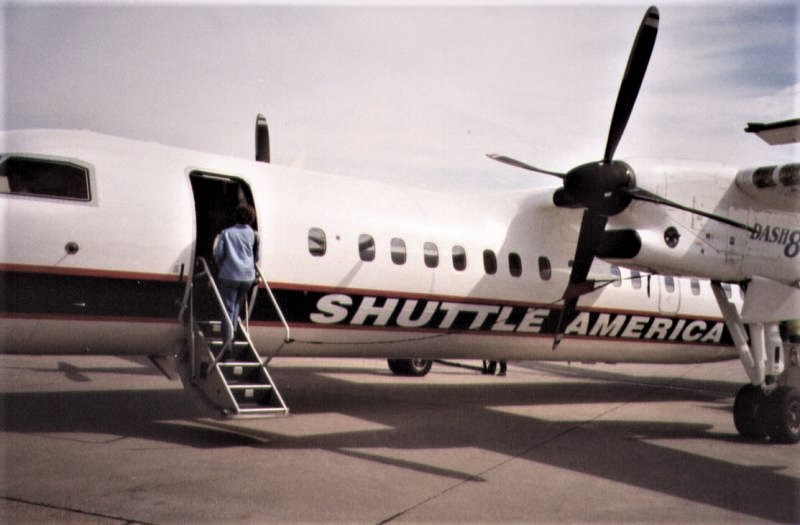
De Havilland Canada DHC 8-300

To sidestep yet another scope clause issue in 2005, Republic Airways Holdings bought Shuttle America from Wexford affiliate Shuttle Acquisition LLC. To avoid further liability, all Embraer 170 aircraft were transferred to Shuttle America, which previously only operated Saab 340 turboprops. Subsequently, American Airlines and its pilots changed the scope agreement as part of the bankruptcy and merger with US Airways to allow more regional airlines, other than wholly owned American Airlines subsidiary American Eagle (now Envoy Air), to fly larger regional airliners under the American Eagle brand. Republic Airlines began flying the first of 47 Embraer 175 aircraft under the American Eagle brand in July 2013.

=== Further acquisitions ===
In September 2005, Republic purchased 113 slots at Ronald Reagan Washington National Airport, 24 slots at LaGuardia Airport, and ten Embraer 170 aircraft from US Airways with an agreement to lease those assets back to US Airways. The deal was necessary for US Airways to emerge from bankruptcy protection.

In July 2009, Republic acquired 89 percent of Mokulele Airlines and financially troubled Midwest Airlines. In October 2009, the company acquired Frontier Airlines which was being reorganized along with Frontier Airlines Holdings' Lynx Aviation in Chapter 11 bankruptcy. On April 13, 2010, Republic announced that Midwest and Frontier would combine into a single airline, keeping the Frontier Airlines name.

On October 23, 2009, Republic announced a joint venture with Mesa Air Group in which Embraer E170 routes operated by Shuttle America were transitioned to smaller Bombardier CRJ200 regional jet aircraft provided by Mesa Airlines.

In the fourth quarter of 2011, Republic announced that it would spin off Frontier as a separate company. On December 2, 2013, Frontier was sold in its entirety to an affiliate of Indigo Partners. As part of the agreement, Republic Airlines removed the remaining Frontier branded Embraer 190 jets in "pro-rated" service with Frontier Airlines.

On July 28, 2014, Republic Airways Holdings announced that Chautauqua Airlines would be absorbed into Shuttle America "by year-end" to reduce costs. Chautauqua's only remaining aircraft, 41 ERJ-145s, would be transferred to the Shuttle America operating certificate. This would leave only two subsidiaries, Republic Airlines and Shuttle America, flying under Republic Airways Holdings.

In 2015, it was announced that Republic Airways Holdings would begin to merge existing subsidiaries Shuttle America and Republic Airlines, with the merger completed by January 31, 2017. As 2015 ended, subsidiary Shuttle America began to transfer aircraft, flight attendants, and pilots over to the Republic Airways certificate. As part of the merger process, Republic Airways Holdings also announced that it would be seeking a single aircraft type, and began to phase out the E-145 aircraft from the Shuttle Certificate with the final flight taking place on September 30, 2016. Additionally, Republic Airways Holdings also announced it would begin to phase out the Q-400 flying on the Republic Airlines certificate. The final Q-400 flight took place on March 31, 2016.

After minor delays, Republic Airline and Shuttle America completed the merger process on the morning of January 31, 2017. At that time, all Shuttle America aircraft and employees began operating under the Republic Airline certificate, and parent company Republic Airways Holdings surrendered the Shuttle America Certificate back to the FAA.

=== Subsidiary timeline ===
Republic Airways Holdings subsidiaries
1974~	2005	2006	2007	2008	2009	2010	2011	2012	2013	2014	2015	2016	2017	2018–2024	2025—Present
Chautauqua Airlines											2014: merged into Shuttle America				
	Republic Airways														
	Shuttle America												2016: merged into Republic Airways		
					Midwest Airlines										
					Frontier Airlines										
															Mesa Airlines

=== Acquisition of Mesa Airlines ===
On April 7, 2025, Republic Airways Holdings announced that it would acquire Mesa Air Group and its Mesa Airlines subsidiary in an all-stock merger. Under the terms of the agreement, Republic shareholders own approximately 88% of the merged company, while Mesa shareholders retain between 6% and 12% subject to final settlement of Mesa's financial obligations. The merger closed November 25, 2025.

Following the merger, the combined company operates approximately 310 Embraer 170/175 aircraft and more than 1,250 daily departures. Republic continues operating under agreements with American Airlines, Delta Air Lines, and United Airlines, while Mesa continues a 10-year agreement with United.

Prior to the merger, Mesa had scaled back its operations to about 60 Embraer 175 aircraft, all of which were leased from United. The merger leaves Republic and SkyWest Airlines as the two largest remaining independent regional airlines in the United States.

== Codeshare agreements ==
Following is a breakdown of traffic upon all Republic Airways Holdings airlines as of April 18, 2017.

Regional brand	Mainline airline	Parent	% of Republic traffic	Total monthly departures
United Express	United Airlines	United Airlines Holdings	32.8%	8,617 (Out of 26,269)
Delta Connection	Delta Air Lines	Delta Air Lines, Inc	15.5%	4,075 (Out of 26,269)
American Eagle	American Airlines	American Airlines Group	51.7%	13,577 (Out of 26,269)

== Fleet overview ==
As of December 2025, Republic Airways Holdings, through its subsidiary Republic Airways and Mesa Airlines, operate 278 regional aircraft.

In February 2010, Republic Airways Holdings became the first North American customer for the Bombardier CSeries regional jet. In 2014, following delays in the CS300 program, Republic expressed doubts in keeping their CS300 order, but announcement that a final decision would be put off. In September 2014 Republic confirmed that their order for 40 Cseries aircraft was still in place, despite ongoing technical issues. As part of the 2016 bankruptcy proceedings, an agreement was reached with Bombardier to amend the order for its CSeries aircraft by deferring payments and deliveries.

On September 17, 2014, Republic Airways Holdings announced it would stop flying Bombardier Q400 turboprops in 2016. The last Q400 was retired in March 2016. On September 30, 2016, the Embraer 145 fleet was retired.

On December 1, 2016, all remaining aircraft operating under the Shuttle America certificate were to be transferred to Republic Airlines as Shuttle America ceased operations as part of the final step in the merger process; the merger was completed on January 31, 2017.

As of January 31, 2017, Republic Airways Holdings, through its subsidiary Republic Airways, operates the largest fleet of Embraer 170 and Embraer 175 aircraft in the world.

On August 8, 2019, it was reported that Republic Airways Holdings appeared to have cancelled the order for 40 Airbus A220-300s long-held by the company, as it is no longer featured as a customer for Airbus according to its latest backlog figures. It had originally ordered the jets in 2010, when they were still known as Bombardier CS300s.

Aircraft	In service		Orders	Passengers					Operated for	Notes
Aircraft	In service		Orders	F	Y+	Y	Total	Refs	Operated for	Notes
Embraer 170	31	13	—	12	20	33	65		American Eagle	
Embraer 170	31	11	—	9	12	48	69		Delta Connection	
Embraer 170	31	7	—	6	16	48	70		United Express	
Embraer 175	247	76	—	12	20	44	76		American Eagle	
Embraer 175	247	46	—	12	12	52	76		Delta Connection	
Embraer 175	247	62	9	12	16	48	76		United Express	
Embraer 175	247	29	—	12	16	48	76		United Express	Operated by Mesa Airlines.
Embraer 175	247	31	—	12	32	26	70		United Express	Operated by Mesa Airlines.
Embraer 175	247	3	—	12	—	64	76		Republic Airways	Operated for American Eagle and as required for charter operations.
Total	278		9							
