= Lynx Aviation =

Regional airline in Denver, Colorado, US

IATA	ICAO	Call sign
L3	SSX	SHASTA
- Founded: 2006; 20 years ago
- Ceased operations: 2011; 15 years ago
- Hubs: Denver International Airport
- Frequent-flyer program: EarlyReturns
- Fleet size: 9
- Destinations: 19
- Parent company: Republic Airways Holdings
- Headquarters: Denver, Colorado, USA
- Website: Archived official website at the Wayback Machine (archive index)

Lynx Aviation, Inc. was a regional airline based in Denver, Colorado, United States. The airline began as a sister company to, and operated feeder service for, Frontier Airlines. The Lynx name played off of the tail pictures of its planes, specifically Larry the Lynx, and the fact that it "linked" smaller airports to the main Denver hub of Frontier Airlines. All flights operated by Lynx Aviation were sold and marketed as "Frontier Airlines operated by Lynx Aviation."

On August 13, 2009, Frontier Airlines and Lynx Aviation were purchased by Republic Airways Holdings of Indianapolis, Indiana through an auction held in the US Bankruptcy Court. In the agreement it was accorded that the remaining operation of Lynx Q400 flights for 2011 would be following the air operator's certificate of Frontier Airlines (F9/FFT) to further consolidate in the operation's final phase.

In 2012, the Lynx Aviation operation was folded into Republic Airways Holdings subsidiary Republic Airways. The remaining Q400 aircraft were withdrawn from Frontier service and placed in service for United Airlines.

== History ==
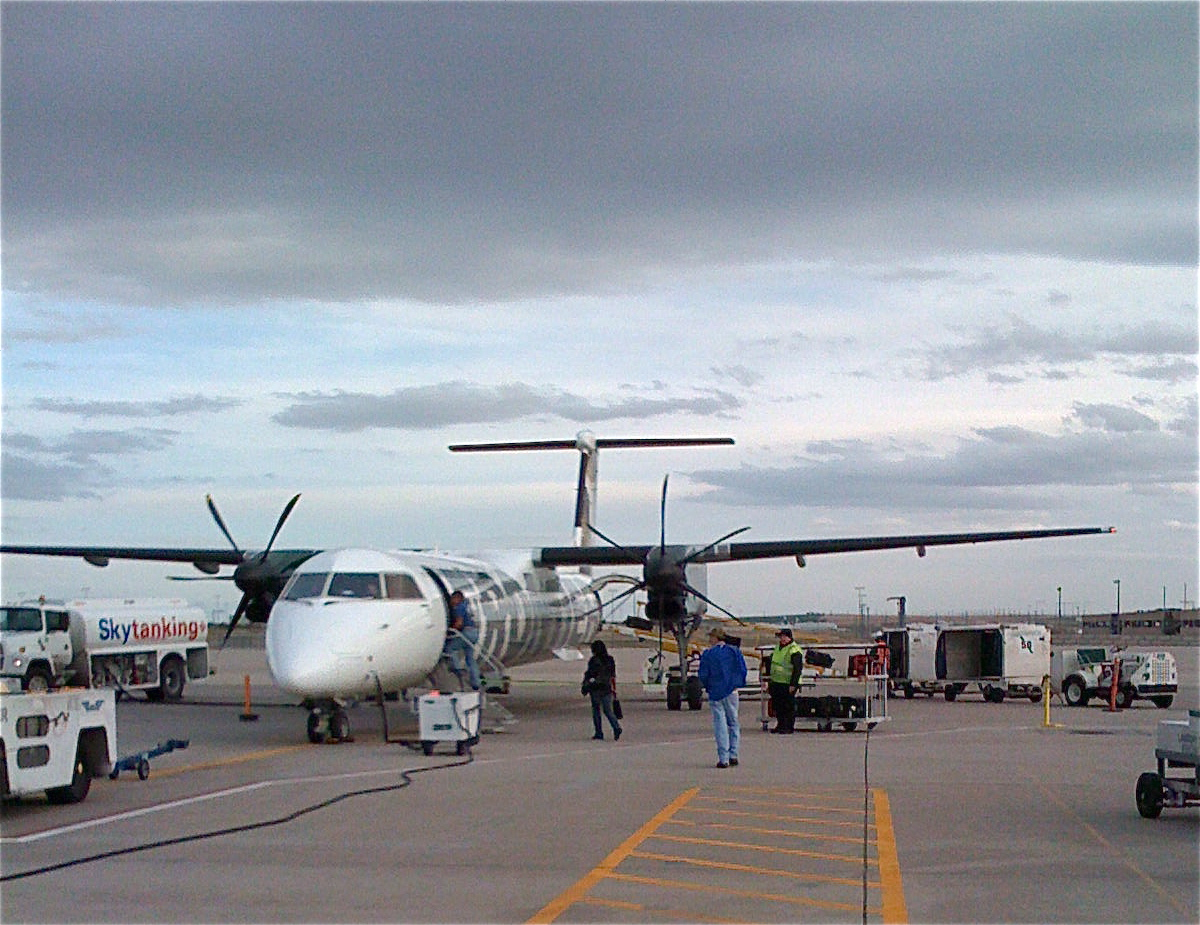
Bombardier Dash 8 (Q400) as operated by Lynx Aviation on behalf of Frontier Airlines at Denver International Airport.

Lynx Aviation was formed by Frontier Airlines Holdings on September 6, 2006. It was formed to help reduce costs; Frontier hoped to cut costs on routes 650 miles or shorter by 30%, allowing entry into new markets. The plan was originally to begin service in May 2007. The carrier received a waiver from the United States Department of Transportation to begin selling seats prior to receipt of their Airline Operating Certificate from the Federal Aviation Administration. Plans were delayed when Frontier announced on September 4, 2007 that FAA certification would not be met in time for the initial launch date of Lynx Aviation service. In the interim, these routes were flown with existing aircraft flown by Republic Airlines and Horizon Air, and beginning in November 2007 aircraft flown by ExpressJet Airlines.

On December 5, 2007, Lynx Aviation received its Airline Operating Certificate from the FAA. Lynx began passenger operations December 7, 2007.

On April 11, 2008, Frontier Airlines Holdings announced that it and all of its subsidiaries had filed for Chapter 11 bankruptcy protection due to its credit card processor withholding payment from ticket sales.

In May 2011, Frontier Airlines got rid of the final 4 Q400s in the fleet that were converted into United Express planes that are still operated by Republic Airlines out of Denver to similar destinations that Lynx served.

== Planned closure ==
On February 4, 2010, Republic Airways announced their intent to close Lynx by September 2010, and transitioning the routes operated by Lynx to Republic Embraer 170/190 regional jets, after determining the turboprop aircraft operated by Lynx placed the company at a competitive disadvantage carrying the same number of passengers. The closure would result in the loss of about 175 jobs, although those laid off would be offered new jobs at Republic or Frontier. To this end, Republic said that it would remove three aircraft from Lynx's fleet on April 6, with a further three scheduled to leave the fleet on April 19. Additionally, service to Tulsa and Fargo would be terminated on April 5.

On 19 August 2010, Frontier announced that Lynx would continue operations between Denver and three Colorado cities—Aspen, Durango and Colorado Springs—using three Bombardier Q400 aircraft, though this service was expected to end in April 2011. In January 2011, it was announced that four Lynx Q400s would continue to operate indefinitely.

Lynx Aviation was eventually merged into Republic Airways with 4 remaining Q400's. After Pinnacle holdings closed Colgan, Republic began to take on the ex-Colgan Q-400s and began operating for United. Competing against Republic Airways' own Frontier airlines.

== Fly Smart ==
Former Western Airlines pilot and chief operating officer of ATA Airlines Inc., Bill Beal; former Sun Country Airlines and Great Lakes Airlines executive Nick Wangler, and, Steven Westberg, former chief financial officer of Midway Airlines and a former vice president of Continental Airlines are trying to raise $40 million to buy Lynx Aviation and rename it Fly Smart. It would connect Sheridan, Cody, Riverton, Laramie, and Casper with Denver.

== Destinations ==
Lynx Aviation operated to the following destinations within the United States:

- Aspen (Aspen-Pitkin County Airport)
- Colorado Springs (Colorado Springs Airport)
- Denver (Denver International Airport) Hub
- Durango (Durango-La Plata County Airport)
- Kansas City, Missouri (Kansas City International Airport)
- Wichita Mid-Continent Airport, Kansas
- Eppley Airfield, Omaha, Nebraska
- Albuquerque International Sunport, New Mexico
- Will Rogers World Airport, Oklahoma City, Oklahoma
- Salt Lake City International Airport, Utah
- Yampa Valley Airport, Hayden, Colorado
- Jackson Hole Airport, Wyoming
- Gallatin Field Airport, Bozeman, Montana
- Billings Logan International Airport, Montana
- Hector International Airport, Fargo, North Dakota
- Tulsa International Airport, Oklahoma
- El Paso International Airport, Texas
- Grand Junction Regional Airport, Colorado
- Rapid City Regional Airport, South Dakota
- Fargo International Airport, North Dakota

== Fleet ==
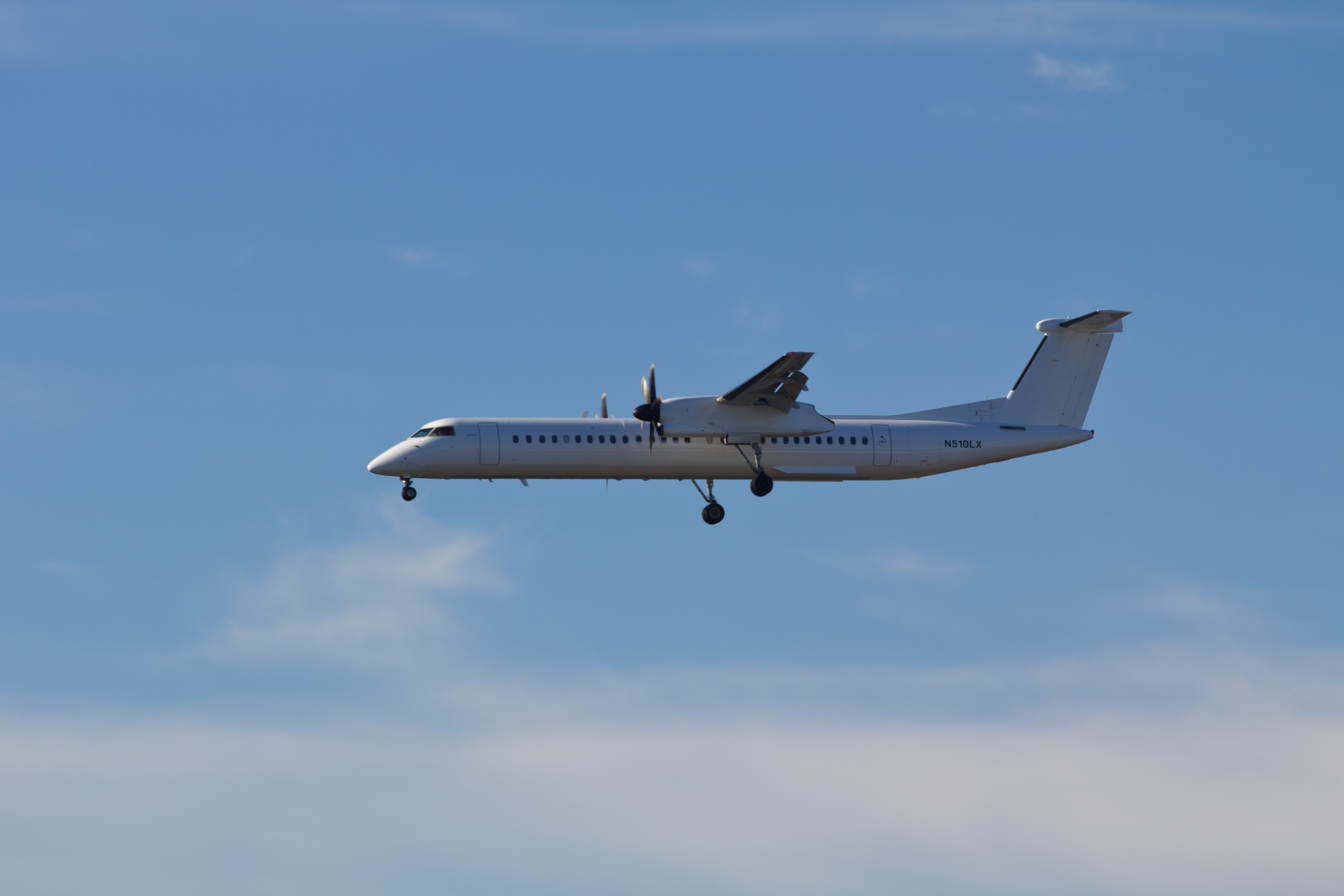
Lynx Aviation De Havilland DHC-8-402Q (N510LX)

The first Q400 was delivered on July 20, 2007, and featured a baby lynx named Luke on the tail. The remaining nine aircraft were delivered by year's end. 1 option was exercised. The remaining 9 options on the aircraft were then declined with the exception of one that was delivered in August 2009.

During 2010, the fleet was reduced to four aircraft, and Republic committed to flying them through April 2011. The aircraft were then sold to Air Canada for their Air Canada Express service (operated by Jazz Air).

Frontier Airlines operated by Lynx Aviation Fleet
Aircraft	Total	Passengers	Notes
Bombardier Q400	9	74	Transferred to Republic Airways and Jazz Aviation

== See also ==
- List of defunct airlines of the United States
