= RP =

RP, R-P, Rp, R-p, or rp may refer to:

== Businesses and organizations ==
- Rainforest Partnership, an environmental organization based in Austin, Texas
- RallyPoint, a social network for the US military
- Reform Party (Singapore), an opposition party in Singapore led by Kenneth Jeyaretnam
- Republic Polytechnic, a polytechnic in Singapore
- Rheinische Post, a German newspaper
- Rhône-Poulenc, a former French chemical company
- Royal Society of Portrait Painters (London), with membership indicated RP
- Roma Party (Romska partija), a political party in Serbia
- Welfare Party, or Refah Partisi, in Turkey
- Chautauqua Airlines, the IATA airline designator RP

== Economics and finance ==
- Repurchase agreement, the sale of securities together with an agreement for the seller to buy back the securities at a later date
- Reservation price, the highest price a buyer is willing to pay for goods or a service
- Rupee, common name for the currencies of several countries
- Rupiah, the official currency of Indonesia

== TV channels ==
- RPTV, a free-to-air channel in the Philippines. Joint venture with Radio Philippines Network (RPN), Nine Media Corporation (NMC), and TV5 Network, Inc.

== Language ==
- Received Pronunciation, a standard accent of Standard English in the United Kingdom
- Rioplatense Spanish, a dialect spoken in parts of Argentina and Uruguay

== Places ==
- Republic of the Philippines (former two-letter country code)
- Republic of Poland (Rzeczpospolita Polska)
- Rhineland-Palatinate, one of sixteen German states
- Région Parisienne or Île-de-France, the area surrounding Paris, France

== Religion ==
- Reformed Presbyterian Church (disambiguation)
- Regulative principle of worship, a Calvinist and Anabaptist principle
- Religious program specialist
- Retribution principle (RP)

== Science, technology, and mathematics ==
=== Biology and medicine ===
- Radical prostatectomy
- Raynaud's phenomenon
- Retinitis pigmentosa
- Medical prescription from Latin, also Rp/.

=== Mathematics ===
- RP (complexity), randomized polynomial time, a class in computational complexity theory
- Ranked Pairs, a Condorcet voting method
- Real projective line
- Real projective plane
- Real projective space

=== Other uses in science and technology ===
- Rapid prototyping, a manufacturing and engineering process
- Rear projection effect, a film technique
- Red phosphorus, an allotrope of the element
- Rendezvous Point in Protocol Independent Multicast, a collection of network layer multicast routing protocols
- Reversed-phase chromatography, a laboratory technique
- Route Processor, a general-purpose CPU in some Cisco routers
- RP, a small rock climbing nut, named after Roland Pauligk
- RP-1, a rocket propellant
- RP-3, a British rocket projectile in World War II

== Other uses ==
- Relief pitcher, a baseball term
- Registered Paralegal, a certification program of the National Federation of Paralegal Associations
- Riot Points (used in League of Legends)
- Regimental Police or Regimental Provost, soldiers responsible for regimental discipline and unit custody in the British Army
- Role-playing
- Rating Pending, a rating used by ESRB in promotional games that has lacked a rating.
