= Midway Airlines (1993–2003) =

US airline in Morrisville, North Carolina

IATA	ICAO	Call sign
JI	MDW	MIDWAY
- Founded: November 15, 1993
- Ceased operations: October 30, 2003
- Hubs: Raleigh/Durham
- Secondary hubs: Chicago–Midway
- Frequent-flyer program: AAdvantage (American) (1993–2001); OnePass (Continental) (2001–2003); WorldPerks (Northwest) (2001–2003)
- Headquarters: Morrisville, North Carolina, U.S.
- Key people: Robert R. Ferguson (CEO)
- Website: www.midwayair.com

Midway Airlines was an airline in the United States based in Morrisville, North Carolina, between Raleigh and Durham. The airline operated between 1993 and 2003.

== History ==
Midway Airlines was formed out of Jet Express, a commuter air carrier that operated code sharing feeder services for Trans World Airlines (TWA) and USAir during the late 1980s and early 1990s. Midway began in November 1993 with Chicago Midway-New York LaGuardia service with two Fokker 100s. This service grew to establish a small hub at Chicago Midway International Airport by adding flights to Philadelphia, Boston, Allentown, Washington D.C., Orlando, Tampa, Dallas/Ft. Worth and Denver. A feeder operation was set up with Direct Air dba Midway Connection to serve many smaller regional cities from Chicago Midway Airport. Due to competition and limited gate space, Midway Airlines moved to Durham, North Carolina, and set up a hub at Raleigh-Durham International Airport (RDU) in early 1995. (Midway eventually moved its headquarters to Morrisville, North Carolina.) Midway's arrival at RDU coincided with the closure of an American Airlines hub, as they focused their assets in MIA after taking over the former Eastern Airlines hub. For several years Midway partnered with American Airlines and offered American Airlines AAdvantage miles in the RDU market. American Airlines also worked Midway's Revenue Management behind the scenes. The two airlines severed relations in 2000 and Midway introduced its own frequent flyer program and Revenue Management was brought in house.

At the height of its operations, Midway offered almost 200 flights daily from RDU to 33 destinations on the East Coast, and was used by many passengers travelling between the Northeast and Southeast.

Midway used a variety of aircraft while hubbed at RDU. Initially, the fleet consisted only of the Fokker 100. Midway added Airbus A320-200s to fly longer routes into the Caribbean; hurricane damage forced those plans to change and the A320s were deployed elsewhere. Midway began service to SJU, CUN, LAS and LAX but these routes eventually became unprofitable and the A320s were disposed of. Midway then obtained a large number of Bombardier CRJ-200s for expansion. By late 2000, the F100s became expensive to maintain and operate, so Midway began to replace them with Boeing 737-700s. In November 2000, Midway expanded nonstop service from RDU to San Jose (SJC). Additionally, they started nonstop service to Denver (DEN) and seasonal service to Steamboat Springs via the Yampa Valley Airport (HDN), both in Colorado.

Two regional carriers operating as Midway Connection via respective code sharing agreements with Midway provided service between RDU and smaller markets with turboprop aircraft. The first was Great Lakes Aviation flying Beechcraft 1900 and Embraer 120 Brasilias from 1995 through 1997 followed by Corporate Airlines, which operated British Aerospace BAe Jetstream 31 aircraft.

The high-tech slump of 2000-01, as well as the commencement of operations at RDU by low-cost carrier Southwest Airlines, hurt Midway, and the carrier filed for Chapter 11 bankruptcy on the evening of August 13, 2001. Thousands of employees were laid off immediately. Increasingly relying on the higher seating capacity of the 737-700s, Midway continued to fly during reorganization, but after the terrorist attacks of September 11, 2001, Midway never restarted operations after airspace was shut down, and ceased operations on September 12, laying off 1,700 employees (the last flights were on the morning of September 11).

Following $12.5 million in financial infusion from the US federal government, Midway resumed service using their fleet of 12 Boeing 737-700 aircraft from RDU under its own livery on December 19, 2001. It continued this service until US Airways offered to have Midway fly regional jets as US Airways Express. On July 17, 2002, Midway once again abruptly discontinued service and disposed of its fleet of 737s and again laid off all employees. They remained closed until February 2003. At that time, they commenced operations as US Airways Express, with limited service offered from hubs in both RDU and Washington Reagan National Airport (DCA). They operated with six regional CRJ-100s serving East Coast cities and some Midwest destinations. It finally ceased operations on October 30, 2003, through a Chapter 7 bankruptcy when it was unable to acquire enough capital to stay afloat despite a private equity firm's infusions during the course of Midway's history. The same private equity firm Wexford Capital eventually became involved with Republic Airways Holdings after disposing of its interests in Midway Airlines along with National Airlines after the 9/11 terrorist attack, which affected the airline industry so drastically.

== Destinations ==
=== Midway Airlines destinations ===
- Allentown (Lehigh Valley International Airport)
- Atlanta (Hartsfield–Jackson Atlanta International Airport)
- Birmingham (Birmingham-Shuttlesworth International Airport)
- Boston (Boston Logan International Airport)
- Buffalo (Buffalo Niagara International Airport)
- Cancún (Cancún International Airport)
- Charleston (Charleston International Airport)
- Chicago (Chicago Midway International Airport)
- Columbia (Columbia Metropolitan Airport)
- Columbus (Port Columbus International Airport)
- Dallas/Fort Worth (Dallas/Fort Worth International Airport)
- Dayton (Dayton International Airport)
- Denver (Denver International Airport)
- Detroit (Detroit Metropolitan Wayne County Airport)
- Fort Lauderdale/Hollywood (Fort Lauderdale-Hollywood International Airport)
- Greenville/Spartanburg (Greenville-Spartanburg International Airport)
- Hartford/Springfield (Bradley International Airport)
- Indianapolis (Indianapolis International Airport)
- Islip (Long Island MacArthur Airport)
- Jacksonville (Jacksonville International Airport)
- Las Vegas (McCarran International Airport)
- Los Angeles (Los Angeles International Airport)
- Louisville (Louisville International Airport)
- Miami (Miami International Airport)
- Myrtle Beach (Myrtle Beach International Airport)
- Newark (Newark Liberty International Airport)
- Newburgh, NY (Stewart International Airport)
- New Bern (Craven County Regional Airport)
- New York City (John F. Kennedy International Airport)
- New York City (LaGuardia Airport)
- New Orleans (Louis Armstrong New Orleans International Airport)
- Norfolk (Norfolk International Airport)
- Orlando (Orlando International Airport)
- Philadelphia (Philadelphia International Airport)
- Pittsburgh (Pittsburgh International Airport)
- Raleigh/Durham (Raleigh-Durham International Airport) - Hub
- Rochester (Greater Rochester International Airport)
- San Jose (Norman Y. Mineta San Jose International Airport)
- San Juan (Luis Muñoz Marín International Airport)
- Steamboat Springs, CO (Yampa Valley Airport)
- Tampa (Tampa International Airport)
- Washington, D.C. (Washington Dulles International Airport)
- Washington, D.C. (Ronald Reagan Washington National Airport)
- West Palm Beach (Palm Beach International Airport)

=== Midway Connection destinations ===
- Asheville, NC
- Baltimore, MD
- Charleston, SC
- Columbia, SC
- Columbus, OH
- Greenville, SC/Spartanburg, SC
- Harrisburg, PA
- Hilton Head, SC
- Jacksonville, FL
- Myrtle Beach, SC
- Norfolk, VA
- Richmond, VA
- Savannah, GA
- Wilmington, NC

=== Frequent-flyer program ===
During its existence, Midway Airlines partnered with the following frequent-flyer programs:

- American Airlines AAdvantage (1993–2001)
- Continental Airlines OnePass (2001–2003)
- Northwest Airlines WorldPerks (2001–2003)

== Fleet ==
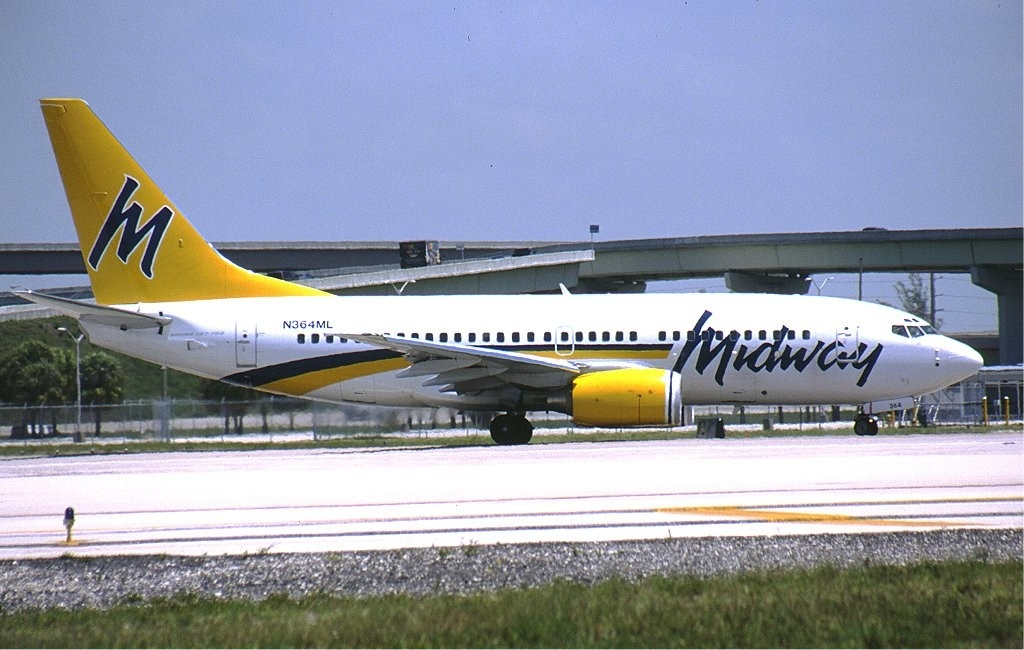
A Midway Airlines Boeing 737-700.

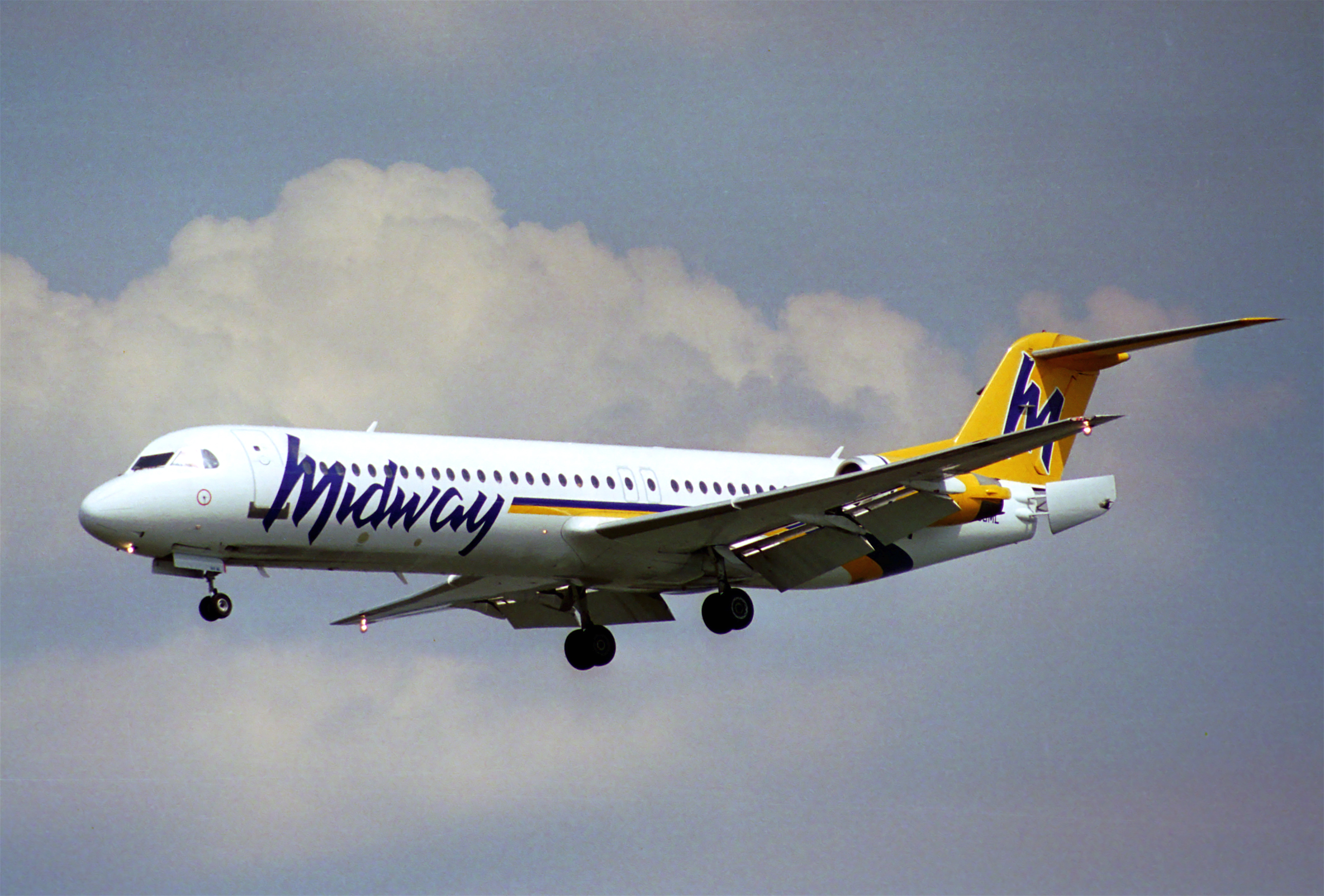
Midway Airlines Fokker 100 (N106ML)

=== Historical ===
Midway Airlines previously operated the following aircraft:

Midway Airlines historical fleet
Aircraft	Total	Introduced	Retired	Remark
Airbus A320-200	5	1995	1999	
Boeing 737-700	12	1999	2003	<
Bombardier CRJ-200LR	25	1997	2004	
Fokker 100	12	1993	2004	

=== Midway Connection aircraft ===
- Beechcraft 1900
- British Aerospace BAe Jetstream 31
- Embraer EMB 120 Brasilia

== See also ==
- List of defunct airlines of the United States
