= Shuttle America =

Regional airline of the United States (1995–2018)

IATA	ICAO	Call sign
S5	TCF	MERCURY
- Founded: 1995; 31 years ago
- Commenced operations: November 12, 1998; 27 years ago
- Ceased operations: January 30, 2017; 9 years ago (merged into Republic Airways)
- Hubs: Chicago–O'Hare; Newark; New York–LaGuardia
- Frequent-flyer program: SkyMiles (Delta); MileagePlus (United)
- Alliance: SkyTeam (Delta); Star Alliance (United)
- Fleet size: 113
- Parent company: Republic Airways Holdings
- Headquarters: Indianapolis, Indiana, United States
- Key people: Bryan Bedford (CEO)
- Founder: David Hackett
- Website: www.shuttleamerica.com

Shuttle America Corporation was a regional airline in the United States based in Indianapolis, Indiana. It fed United Airlines flights at Chicago O'Hare International Airport and Houston George Bush Intercontinental Airport as United Express, as well as Delta Air Lines flights at Atlanta, New York-LaGuardia, and New York-JFK under the Delta Connection brand. Shuttle America also operated two of three Delta Shuttle East Coast routes, serving Washington, D.C. and Chicago from New York-LaGuardia.

Shuttle America merged into Republic Airways on January 31, 2017.

== History ==
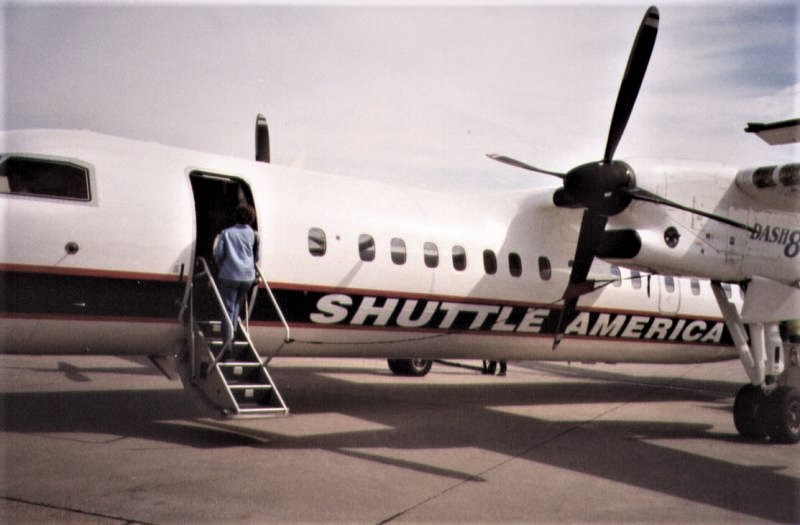
N801SA boards at Bradley International Airport (BDL) to Wilmington, DE (ILG) in 1999.

Shuttle America was established in 1995 by former CEO David Hackett, and began operations on November 12, 1998, as a low-fare commuter airline, headquartered in Windsor Locks, Connecticut, the location of Hartford's Bradley International Airport. Shuttle America's first route was Hartford, Connecticut, to Buffalo, New York. Shuttle America got much publicity for their launch because of their "super-low $29 fares". Shuttle America's first aircraft; registered N801SA, was a 50-seat Bombardier Dash 8-300 with leather seats and a very creative and patriotic paint scheme. Shuttle America had rapid growth in its first year, adding more aircraft and destinations.

In 1999, Shuttle America made a controversial move to reach the Boston market. Instead of choosing the busy Logan Airport in East Boston, Shuttle America chose a nearby regional airport, Hanscom Field. Located in Bedford, Massachusetts, just 12 miles (19 km) west of Boston, it had amenities not found at the larger Logan Airport. With free parking, rental cars, and convenience to the I-95 highway, it was promoted as "Hassle-free Hanscom Field". From Hanscom, Shuttle America served Buffalo, LaGuardia Airport in New York, Trenton, New Jersey, and Greensboro, North Carolina, via Trenton. At that time Trenton was acting as a hub because of its central location in their route network.

At the peak time of their operation without codeshares, the airline was flying six Dash 8-300 aircraft and transported over 3000 passengers per day. Additional destinations in their route network during this time period include Albany, New York, Islip, New York, Norfolk, Virginia, and Wilmington, Delaware. Despite the success in quickly expanding throughout the region, the airline attained financial trouble with its growth.

In 2001, Shuttle America was purchased by Wexford Holdings LLC., who at the time also owned Chautauqua Airlines. Shuttle America then started flying as US Airways Express in a codeshare agreement, adding service to US Airways' Philadelphia and Pittsburgh hubs as well as seasonal service to Martha's Vineyard, MA. At the same time, Shuttle America was transitioning to the smaller Dash 8-100 and started taking deliveries of former Chautauqua Saab 340 aircraft. The Dash 8-100's had been leased from Allegheny Airlines and were a temporary stop gap measure to allow for the spool up of the Saab 340 fleet. Eventually, the Dash 8-300's were sold to various airlines including Caribbean Star and Piedmont Airlines while the independent branding of Shuttle America was phased out in lieu of a full network of codeshares with US Airways and United Airlines with subsequent route changes to feed those carriers. In 2002, Shuttle America moved its headquarters to Fort Wayne, Indiana. In spring 2005, it was purchased by Republic Airways Holdings for $1 million. Headquarters were moved from Fort Wayne to Republic's Indianapolis base shortly afterwards, and the Saab 340 fleet was replaced by Embraer 170 aircraft operating for Delta Connection and United Express.

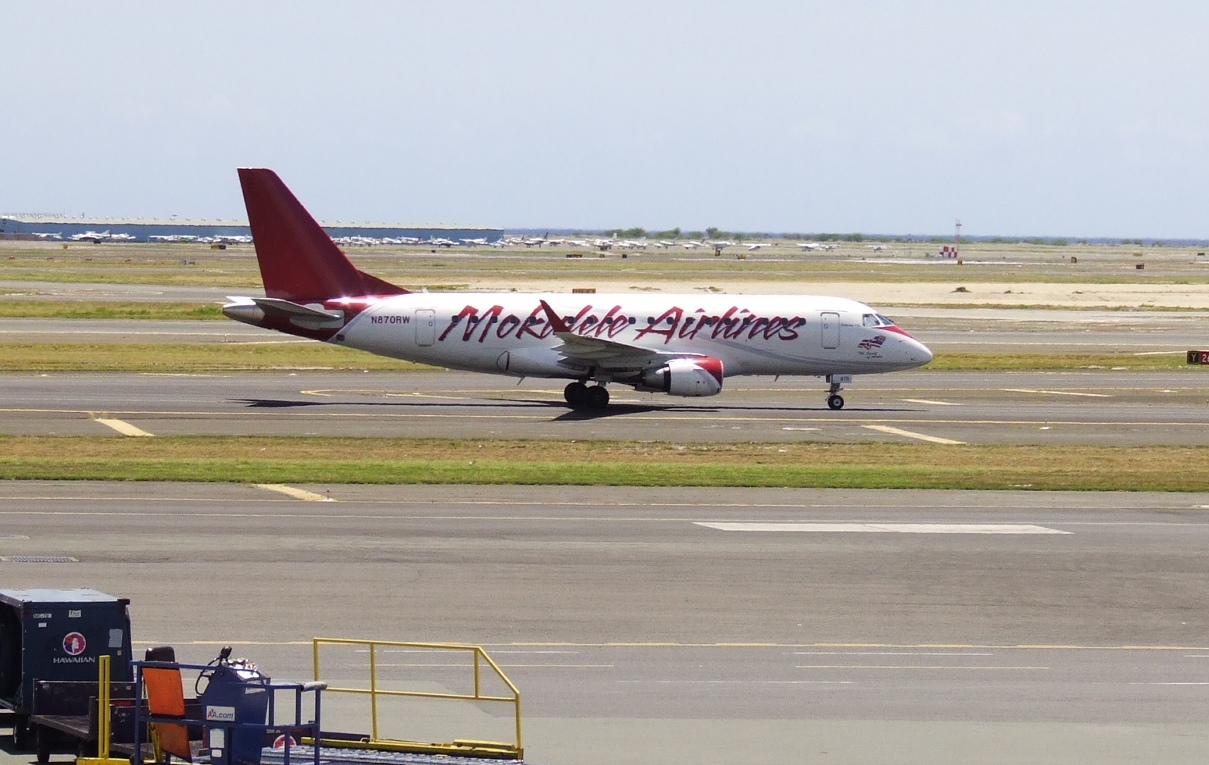
Former Mokulele Airlines Embraer 170 operated by Shuttle America

In October 2008, a short-lived operating partnership was established with Mokulele Airlines to feed their hub in Honolulu with three aircraft. These Embraer 170 aircraft operated in the livery of Mokulele Airlines until October 2009, when Republic entered into a new joint venture agreement with Mesa Air Group, with the latter airline's Canadair Regional Jet aircraft operating jet flights within Hawaii.

In an effort to reduce costs, parent company Republic Airways Holdings announced in 2014 that it would begin the process of merging subsidiaries Republic Airlines, Shuttle America and Chautauqua Airlines. Republic Airways Holdings merged Shuttle America and Chautauqua Airlines by the end of 2014 to reduce costs. As Republic Airways Holdings entered bankruptcy protection in February 2016, they announced that they would be merging the Shuttle America certificate into Republic Airlines operations.

Shuttle America operated its last Embraer ERJ-145 service on September 30, 2016.

On the evening of January 30, 2017, Shuttle America ceased operations and all remaining aircraft and crew were transferred to the Republic Airways Inc. certificate. This was intended to allow reduced costs as Republic Airways Holdings operates a single airline, with a single aircraft type, for the 3 major codeshares, Delta Air Lines, American Airlines, and United Airlines.

== Operations ==
Shuttle America had five crew member bases at the time of its merger into Republic: Columbus, Chicago O'Hare, Indianapolis, Newark, and New York-LaGuardia. Its fleet was made up solely of Embraer E170 jetliners with a two-cabin seating configuration. For United Airlines, Shuttle America operated the E170 in a two-class configuration of 6 First Class seats, and 64 economy. For Delta Air Lines, Shuttle America operated the E170 and the larger E-175 aircraft. Both of these aircraft consisted of a two-class configuration, with the E170 consisting of 9 first class seats, and 60 economy seats, while the larger E175 aircraft consists of 12 first class seats and 64 economy. These aircraft were initially operated by sister company Chautauqua Airlines, but Chautauqua was forced to transfer their 170s to Shuttle America after the pilots' union at American Airlines claimed the aircraft violated a "scope clause" regulating the size of regional aircraft operated by airlines that also operate under the American Airlines IATA airline designator code. Beginning in July, 2008, slightly larger Embraer E175 aircraft began to replace the Embraer E170 fleet in service with Delta. Towards the end of 2008, the airline achieved a major feat by being chosen to replace Delta Shuttle's MD-88 operations between New York's LaGuardia Airport and Washington Reagan National Airport on the same hourly schedule that Delta has operated with larger aircraft for decades. Beginning June, 2010, new flights by Shuttle America on behalf of Delta Shuttle served Chicago's O'Hare International Airport from New York-LaGuardia with 11 round trips per day.

== Callsign ==
On July 3, 2007, Shuttle America received approval from the ICAO to change its ATC callsign from Shuttlecraft to Mercury. However, prior to the changing of the callsign to Mercury it was changed to Crossroads, but the word "cross" caused confusion between aircraft and air traffic control ("cross" being a common phrase when taxiing aircraft, i.e. "Cross runway 25L"). This change was necessary due to the similar-sounding Air Shuttle callsign used by Mesa Airlines. The IDENT code remained the same as TCF. The IATA code of the airline has remained S5 through this time.

== Crew bases ==
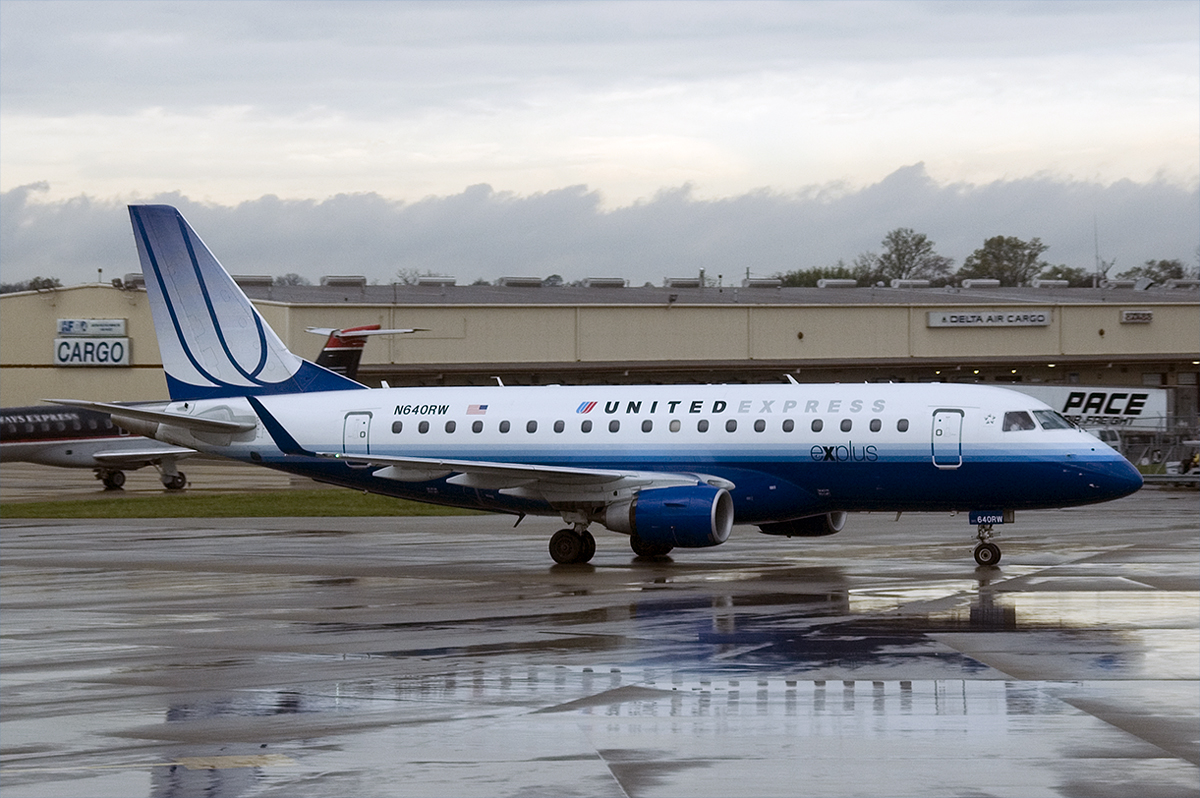
United Express Embraer E170 operated by Shuttle America

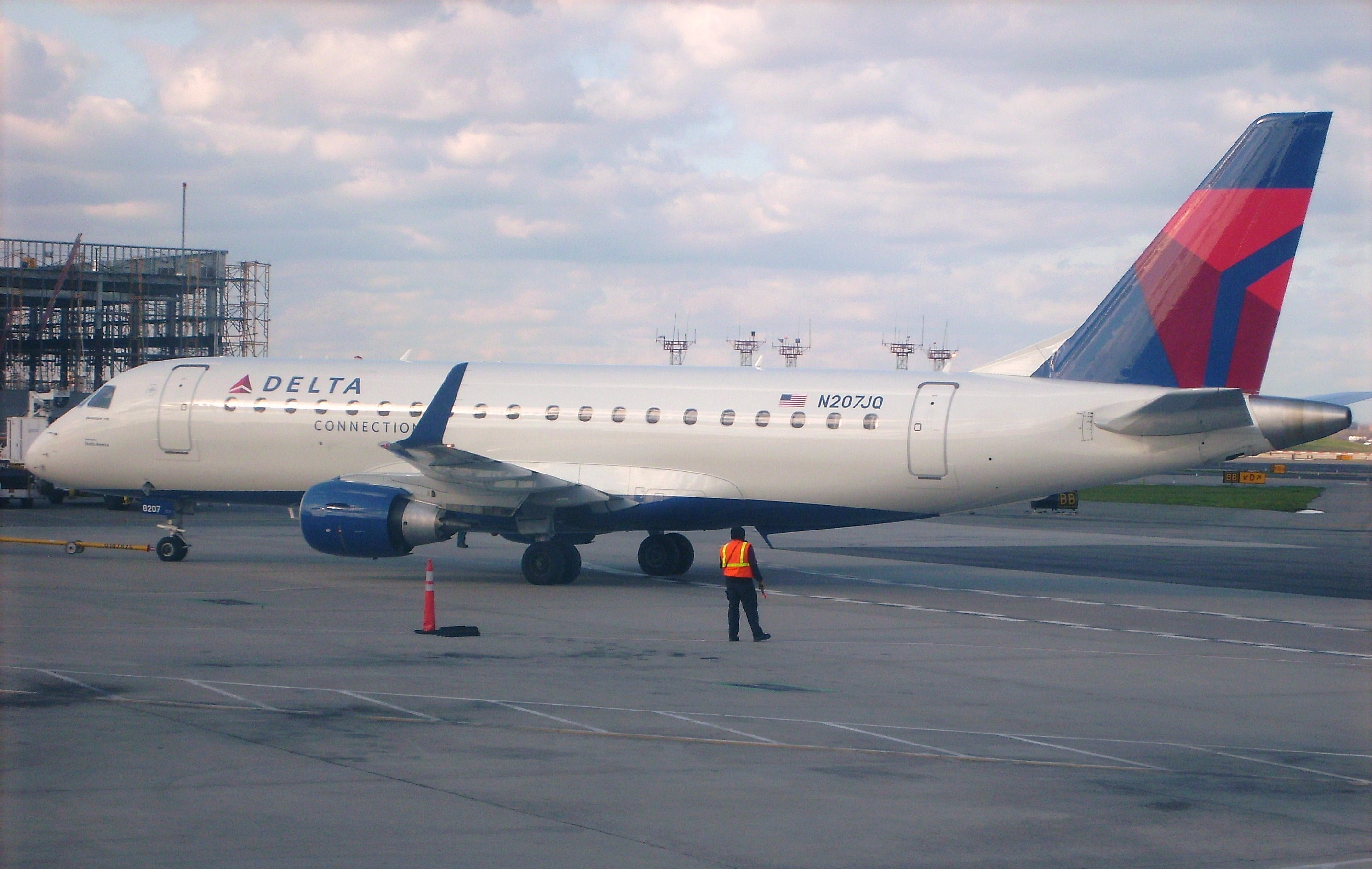
Delta Connection Embraer E175 operated by Shuttle America

- Pittsburgh, Pennsylvania – Pittsburgh International Airport 2001–2005, USAir Express SF-340A
- Trenton, New Jersey – Mercer County Airport 2001–2004, USAir Express SF-340A
- Fairfax, VA – Dulles International Airport 2004–2005, United Express SF-340A
- Chicago, Illinois – O'Hare International Airport
- Columbus, Ohio – John Glenn Columbus International Airport
- Indianapolis, Indiana – Indianapolis International Airport
- Newark, New Jersey – Newark Liberty International Airport
- New York City-LaGuardia, New York – LaGuardia Airport

== Fleet ==
As of January 2017, the Shuttle America fleet consisted of the following aircraft:

Aircraft	Total	Orders	Passengers				Operated For	Notes
Aircraft	Total	Orders	F	Y+	Y	Total	Operated For	Notes
Embraer E170	5	—	6	16	48	70	United Express	Transferred to Republic Airways
Embraer E170	14	—	9	12	48	69	Delta Connection; Delta Shuttle	2 planes on wet lease from Republic Airways
Embraer E175	16	—	12	12	52	76	Delta Connection; Delta Shuttle	2 planes on wet lease from Republic Airways
Total	35	—						

== Incidents ==
Although Shuttle America was never involved in a fatal accident, it has been involved in several mishaps, notably:

- On June 8, 2005: Shuttle America flight 7534, a United Express Saab 340A reported undercarriage problems on approach to Washington Dulles International Airport. Undercarriage collapsed on landing, aircraft skidded off the runway, and onto grass. No fatalities were reported but the aircraft was damaged beyond repair.
- On February 18, 2007, Shuttle America flight 6448, a Delta Connection Embraer E-170 aircraft skidded off the snow covered 6,017 foot runway due to pilot error/fatigue and crashed through a fence while landing on runway 28 at 3:14pm at Cleveland Hopkins International Airport. The flight was arriving from Hartsfield-Jackson Atlanta International Airport. None of the 70 passengers and four crew on board the flight were reported injured.
- On February 27, 2012, Shuttle America flight 5124, a United Express Embraer E-170 aircraft operating a flight from Atlanta made an emergency landing at Newark Liberty International Airport after the pilots received an unsafe nose gear indication on approach; a fly-by of the tower confirmed the nose gear was retracted. The aircraft subsequently came to rest on runway 22L supported only by its main landing gear. The 66 passengers and 4 crew escaped uninjured.
- On June 13, 2013, a Shuttle America Embraer E-170 aircraft departing LaGuardia Airport was involved in a near-miss with a Delta Air Lines Boeing 747 arriving at John F. Kennedy International Airport. Both aircraft were turning away from each other when they lost the required separation distance.

== See also ==
- List of defunct airlines of the United States
