= Republic Airways =

Regional airline of the United States

Republic Airways Inc.

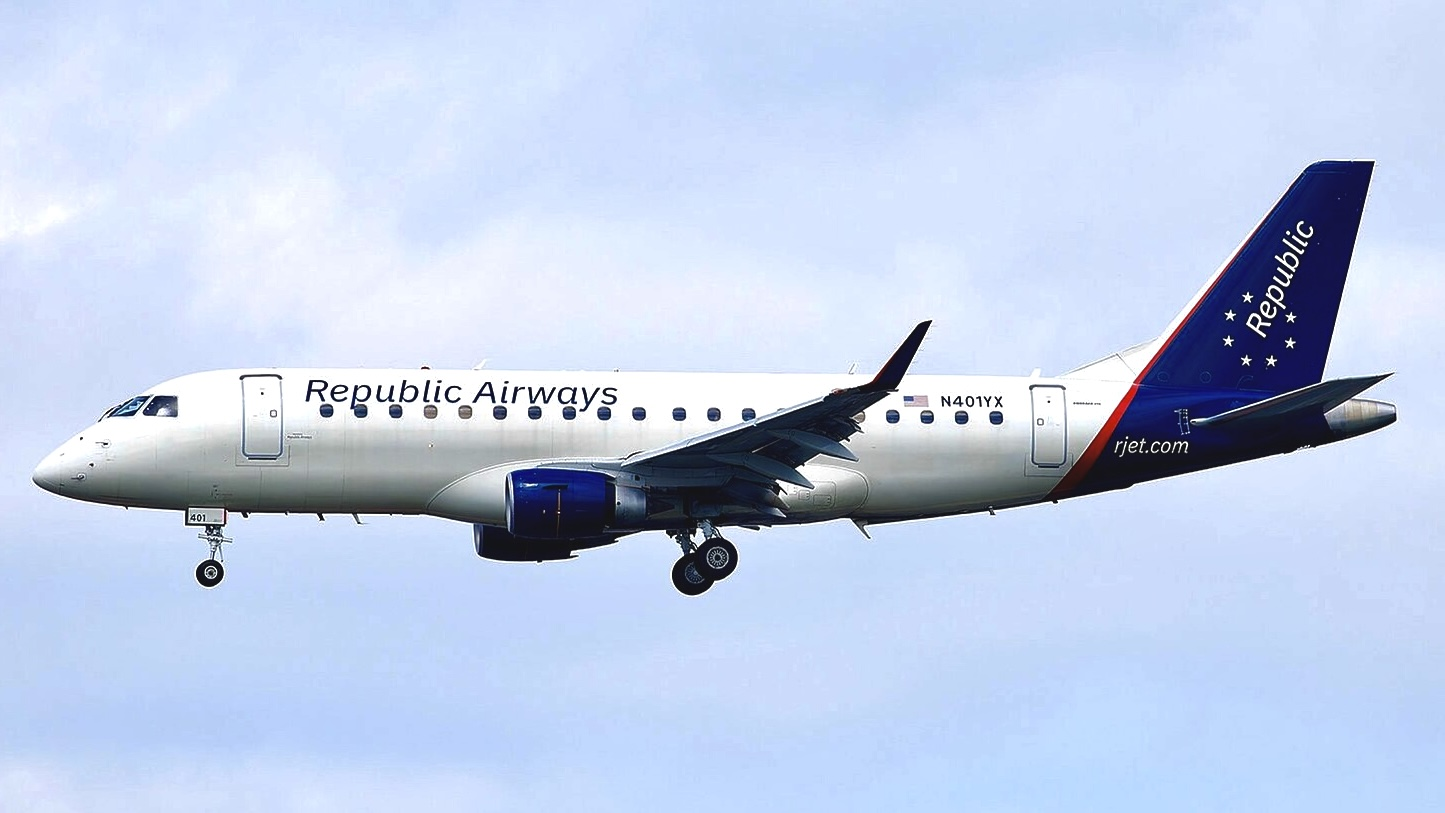
- Embraer 175 painted in Republic Airways House livery
IATA	ICAO	Call sign
YX	RPA	BRICKYARD
- Founded: 1998; 28 years ago
- AOC #: R61A758X
- Hubs: Boston; Chicago–O'Hare; Columbus–Glenn; Indianapolis; Louisville; Newark; New York–LaGuardia; Philadelphia; Pittsburgh; Washington–National
- Fleet size: 254
- Parent company: Republic Airways Holdings
- Headquarters: Carmel, Indiana, United States
- Key people: David Grizzle (chair & CEO)
- Employees: 6,100 (2024)
- Website: rjet.com

Republic Airways is a regional airline in the United States and a subsidiary of Republic Airways Holdings that operates service for American Airlines (as American Eagle), Delta Air Lines (as Delta Connection), and United Airlines (as United Express) using a fleet of Embraer 170 and 175 regional jets. It is headquartered in Carmel, Indiana.

== History ==
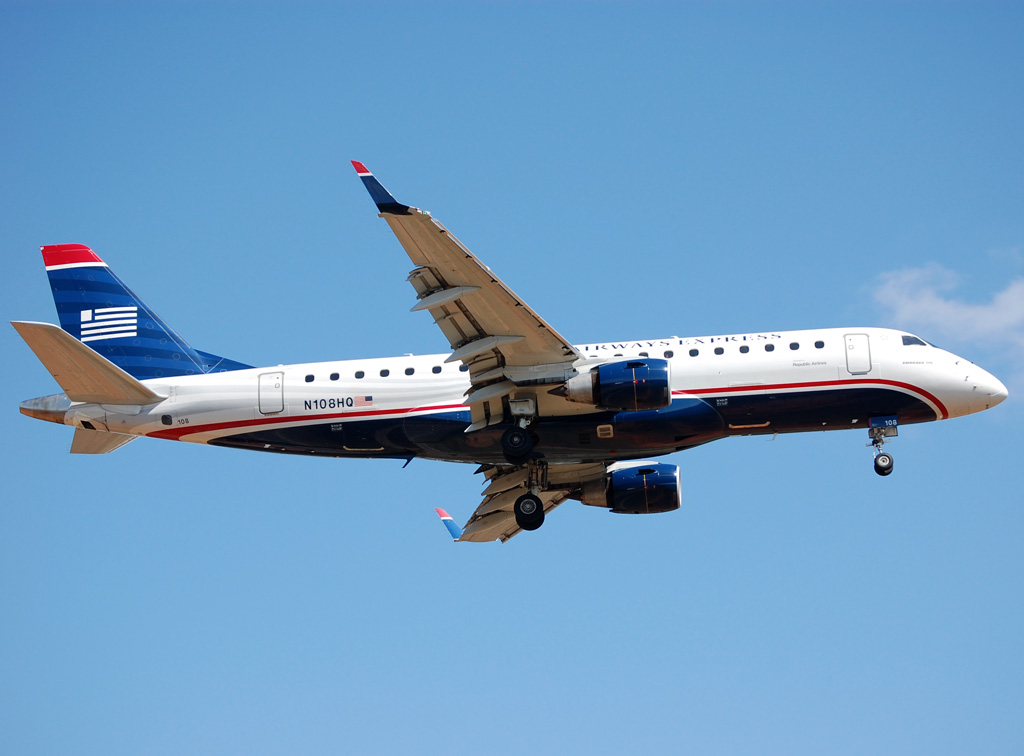
Republic Airways Embraer 175 with US Airways Express titles

In 1999, Republic Airways Holdings incorporated a new subsidiary, "Republic Airline, Inc." but the subsidiary had no activity prior to 2004 and no ability to operate aircraft prior to 2005. In 2004 the holding company activated Republic Airways in reaction to a pilots' suit against American Airlines.

American had awarded the flying of 44-seat regional jets to Chautauqua Airlines, then the main operating subsidiary of Republic Airways Holdings. However, Chautauqua later started to operate 70-seat regional jets on behalf of United Airlines, and this caused American to be in violation of its pilot union scope clause, which prevented an airline from operating on behalf of American if that airline was operating jet aircraft of more than 50 seats, even if such aircraft were operating on behalf of a carrier other than American. To repair the situation, Republic Airways Holdings activated Republic Airline, and upon Part 121 certification in 2005 allowing Republic Airline to operate commercial service. Republic Airways Holdings then transferred the offending 70-seat regional jets from Chautauqua to Republic Airline. American was then no longer in violation of its pilot union scope clause. Republic Airways Holdings paid $6.6 million to the pilot union of American Airlines to settle the issue.

US Airways' pilots had a scope clause prohibiting the airline from operating large regional jets such as the Embraer 170. The airline negotiated around this clause by offering flight deck jobs to laid-off US Airways pilots, in a program known as "Jets for Jobs". This agreement created a subsidiary, MidAtlantic Airways. As part of US Airways' bankruptcy restructuring, the 25 Embraer 170s delivered to MidAtlantic were bought by Republic to help US Airways come out of bankruptcy; Republic operates them along with additional newly delivered aircraft.

In 2007, Frontier Airlines signed an 11-year service agreement with Republic Airways. Under the agreement, Republic would operate 17 Embraer 170 aircraft for Frontier. The first aircraft was placed into service in March 2007, and the last aircraft was expected to be placed into service by December 2008. On April 23, 2008, Republic Airways Holdings (parent of Republic Airline) terminated its service agreement with Frontier Airlines, which entered Chapter 11 bankruptcy in early April 2008. Subsequently, Republic Air Holdings purchased Frontier Airlines in bankruptcy. Frontier-branded Republic Airways E190 aircraft provided regional capacity support. In September 2013, Republic Airways Holdings sold Frontier Airlines. As part of the sale, Republic Airways negotiated a provision that prevented the Frontier-branded E190s from being flown.

On February 1, 2008, Republic Airways opened a base at John Glenn Columbus International Airport in Columbus, Ohio.

On September 3, 2008, Republic signed a new 10-year codeshare agreement with Midwest Airlines. The aircraft would be based at Kansas City International Airport beginning October 1, 2008. Twelve aircraft would be placed in service with Midwest. On June 23, 2009, Republic announced it would acquire Midwest Airlines for $31 million.

In January 2013, Republic Airways Holdings reached a capacity purchase agreement with American Airlines to operate Embraer 175 airplanes under the American Eagle brand beginning in mid-2013. Republic began service as an American Eagle affiliate on August 1, 2013, from Chicago to New Orleans, Pittsburgh, and Albuquerque.

On February 25, 2016, the airline filed for Chapter 11 bankruptcy protection. The airline was hit hard because of pilot shortages, but a new contract ratified in October 2015 helped restructure the airline. At the time of filing, Republic Holdings claimed $2.97 billion in liabilities and $3.56 billion in assets. On November 16, 2016, Republic Airways Holdings filed their reorganization plan, with the intention to emerge from Chapter 11 during the first quarter of 2017.

It was announced that parent company Republic Airways Holdings would merge subsidiaries Shuttle America and Republic Airways into one company, with Republic Airways being chosen as the surviving company. On January 31, 2017, Shuttle America merged with Republic Airways. In December 2018, the operating division was renamed Republic Airways to match its parent company.

On September 21, 2021, Republic Airways announced it will move its corporate headquarters to Carmel, Indiana. The headquarters, training facility and hotel was a $200 million project which opened on February 9, 2026.

As of November 25, 2025, Republic Airways has the largest fleet of Embraer 170 and Embraer 175 aircraft in the world.

=== Merger with Mesa Airlines ===
On April 7, 2025, Republic Airways Holdings announced that it would acquire Mesa Airlines in an all-stock merger. Under the terms of the agreement, Republic shareholders will own approximately 88% of the merged company, while Mesa shareholders will retain between 6% and 12%. The merger closed on November 25, 2025.

Following the merger, the combined company becomes the second-largest regional airline in the US and operates about 310 Embraer 170/175 aircraft, the world's largest fleet of Embraer regional jets, and more than 1,250 daily departures. Republic will continue operating under agreements with American Airlines, Delta Air Lines, and United Airlines, while Mesa will fly under a 10-year agreement with United.

Prior to the merger, Mesa had scaled back its operations to about 60 Embraer 175 aircraft, all of which were leased from United. The merger would leave Republic and SkyWest Airlines as the two largest remaining independent regional airlines in the United States.

== Crew bases ==
- Boston
- Chicago–O'Hare
- Columbus
- Indianapolis
- Louisville
- Newark
- New York–LaGuardia
- Philadelphia
- Pittsburgh
- Washington–National

== Destinations ==
As of June 2025, Republic operates the following routes for American Eagle, Delta Connection, and United Express.

List of destinations
City	Country (Subdivision)	IATA	Airport	Notes
Halifax	Canada (Nova Scotia)	YHZ	Halifax Stanfield International Airport	
Ottawa	Canada (Ontario)	YOW	Ottawa Macdonald–Cartier International Airport	
Toronto	Canada (Ontario)	YYZ	Toronto Pearson International Airport	
Montreal	Canada (Quebec)	YUL	Montréal–Trudeau International Airport	
Quebec City	Canada (Quebec)	YQB	Québec City Jean Lesage International Airport	
Fayetteville/Springdale	United States (Arkansas)	XNA	Northwest Arkansas Regional Airport	
Little Rock	United States (Arkansas)	LIT	Clinton National Airport	
Jacksonville	United States (Florida)	JAX	Jacksonville International Airport	
Key West	United States (Florida)	EYW	Key West International Airport	
Sarasota	United States (Florida)	SRQ	Sarasota–Bradenton International Airport	
Tallahassee	United States (Florida)	TLH	Tallahassee International Airport	
Atlanta	United States (Georgia)	ATL	Hartsfield–Jackson Atlanta International Airport	
Savannah	United States (Georgia)	SAV	Savannah/Hilton Head International Airport	
Chicago	United States (Illinois)	ORD	O'Hare International Airport	Base
Indianapolis	United States (Indiana)	IND	Indianapolis International Airport	Base
Cedar Rapids	United States (Iowa)	CID	Eastern Iowa Airport	
Des Moines	United States (Iowa)	DSM	Des Moines International Airport	
Lexington	United States (Kentucky)	LEX	Blue Grass Airport	
Louisville	United States (Kentucky)	SDF	Louisville Muhammad Ali International Airport	Base
New Orleans	United States (Louisiana)	MSY	Louis Armstrong New Orleans International Airport	
Bangor	United States (Maine)	BGR	Bangor International Airport	
Portland	United States (Maine)	PWM	Portland International Jetport	
Baltimore	United States (Maryland)	BWI	Baltimore/Washington International Airport	
Boston	United States (Massachusetts)	BOS	Logan International Airport	Base
Worcester	United States (Massachusetts)	ORH	Worcester Regional Airport	
Detroit	United States (Michigan)	DTW	Detroit Metropolitan Wayne County Airport	
Grand Rapids	United States (Michigan)	GRR	Gerald R. Ford International Airport	
Traverse City	United States (Michigan)	TVC	Cherry Capital Airport	
Duluth	United States (Minnesota)	DLH	Duluth International Airport	
Minneapolis/St. Paul	United States (Minnesota)	MSP	Minneapolis–Saint Paul International Airport	
Kansas City	United States (Missouri)	MCI	Kansas City International Airport	
St. Louis	United States (Missouri)	STL	St. Louis Lambert International Airport	
Lincoln	United States (Nebraska)	LNK	Lincoln Airport (Nebraska)	
Omaha	United States (Nebraska)	OMA	Eppley Airfield	
Newark	United States (New Jersey)	EWR	Newark Liberty International Airport	Base
Buffalo	United States (New York)	BUF	Buffalo Niagara International Airport	
Ithaca	United States (New York)	ITH	Ithaca Tompkins International Airport	
New York City	United States (New York)	JFK	John F. Kennedy International Airport	
New York City	United States (New York)	LGA	LaGuardia Airport	Base
Rochester	United States (New York)	ROC	Greater Rochester International Airport	
Syracuse	United States (New York)	SYR	Syracuse Hancock International Airport	
Asheville	United States (North Carolina)	AVL	Asheville Regional Airport	
Charlotte	United States (North Carolina)	CLT	Charlotte Douglas International Airport	
Greensboro	United States (North Carolina)	GSO	Piedmont Triad International Airport	
Raleigh/Durham	United States (North Carolina)	RDU	Raleigh–Durham International Airport	
Wilmington	United States (North Carolina)	ILM	Wilmington International Airport	
Cincinnati, Ohio area	United States (Kentucky)	CVG	Cincinnati/Northern Kentucky International Airport	Airport is in Kentucky
Cleveland	United States (Ohio)	CLE	Cleveland Hopkins International Airport	
Columbus	United States (Ohio)	CMH	John Glenn Columbus International Airport	Base
Oklahoma City	United States (Oklahoma)	OKC	OKC Will Rogers International Airport	
Tulsa	United States (Oklahoma)	TUL	Tulsa International Airport	
Harrisburg	United States (Pennsylvania)	MDT	Harrisburg International Airport	
Philadelphia	United States (Pennsylvania)	PHL	Philadelphia International Airport	Base
Pittsburgh	United States (Pennsylvania)	PIT	Pittsburgh International Airport	Base
Providence	United States (Rhode Island)	PVD	Rhode Island T. F. Green International Airport	
Charleston	United States (South Carolina)	CHS	Charleston International Airport	
Columbia	United States (South Carolina)	CAE	Columbia Metropolitan Airport	
Greenville–Spartanburg	United States (South Carolina)	GSP	Greenville–Spartanburg International Airport	
Hilton Head Island	United States (South Carolina)	HHH	Hilton Head Airport	
Myrtle Beach	United States (South Carolina)	MYR	Myrtle Beach International Airport	
Knoxville	United States (Tennessee)	TYS	McGhee Tyson Airport	
Memphis	United States (Tennessee)	MEM	Memphis International Airport	
Nashville	United States (Tennessee)	BNA	Nashville International Airport	
Dallas	United States (Texas)	DFW	Dallas Fort Worth International Airport	
Burlington	United States (Vermont)	BTV	Burlington International Airport	
Charlottesville	United States (Virginia)	CHO	Charlottesville–Albemarle Airport	
Norfolk	United States (Virginia)	ORF	Norfolk International Airport	
Richmond	United States (Virginia)	RIC	Richmond International Airport	
Roanoke	United States (Virginia)	ROA	Roanoke–Blacksburg Regional Airport	
Washington, D.C. area	United States (Virginia)	IAD	Washington Dulles International Airport	
Washington, D.C. area	United States (Virginia)	DCA	Ronald Reagan Washington National Airport	Base
Hobart	United States (Wisconsin)	GRB	Green Bay–Austin Straubel International Airport	
Madison	United States (Wisconsin)	MSN	Dane County Regional Airport	
Milwaukee	United States (Wisconsin)	MKE	Milwaukee Mitchell International Airport	

== Fleet ==
=== Current fleet ===
As of March 2026, the Republic Airways fleet consists of the following aircraft:

Aircraft	In service	Orders	Passengers				Operated for	Notes
Aircraft	In service	Orders	F	Y+	Y	Total	Operated for	Notes
Embraer 170	13	–	12	20	34	66	American Eagle	
Embraer 170	11	—	9	12	48	69	Delta Connection	
Embraer 170	4	—	6	16	48	70	United Express	To be retired and replaced by the Embraer 175.
Embraer 170	5	—	N/A				Republic Airways	Unallocated spare aircraft.
Embraer 175	79	29	12	20	44	76	American Eagle	Deliverys begin in 2026 though 2029.
Embraer 175	46	29	12	20	44	76	Delta Connection	Deliverys begin in 2026 though 2029.
Embraer 175	62	29	12	16	48	76	United Express	Deliverys begin in 2026 though 2029.
Embraer 175	3	—	12	—	64	76	Republic Airways	Operated for American Eagle and as required for charter operations.
Total	223	29						

=== Fleet development ===
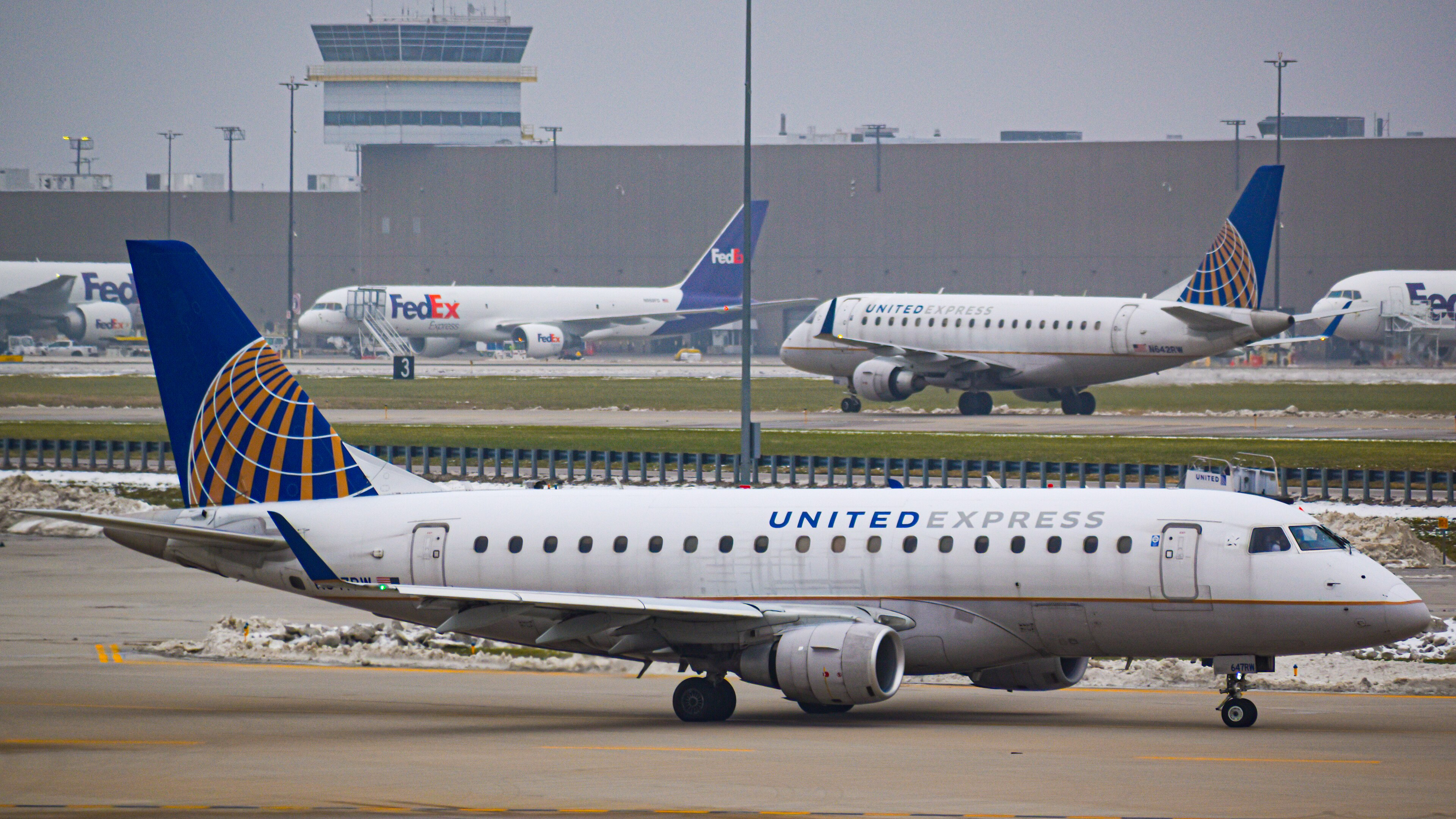
2 United Express E170s at Indianapolis International Airport

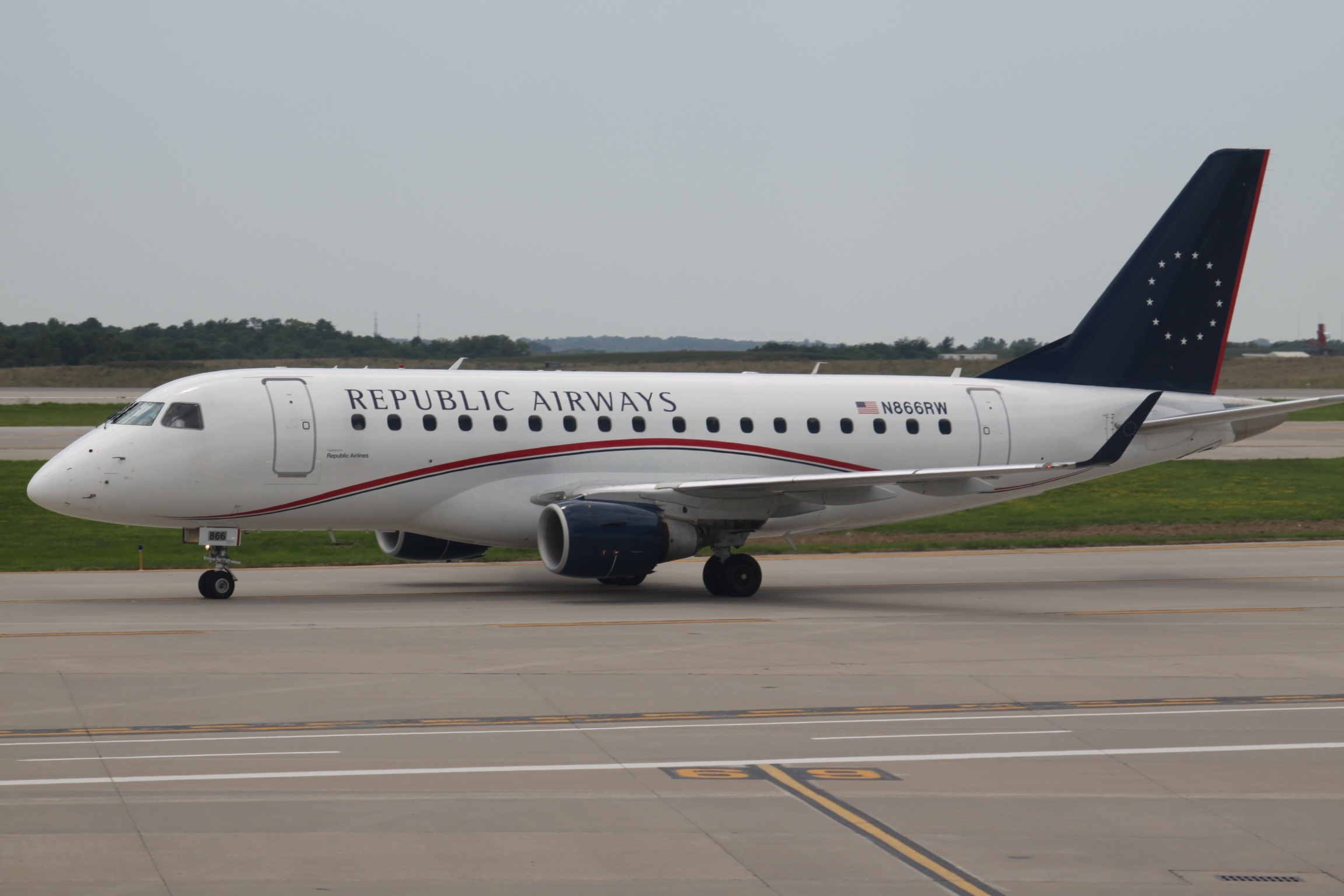
Republic Airways E170 with Republic branding at Kansas City International Airport

The Embraer 175 made its United States domestic debut when the first aircraft was delivered to Republic Airways in March 2007. Total orders were for 36 aircraft, which were operated in an 80-seat configuration under the US Airways Express brand name.

In July 2010, Republic ordered a further 24 Embraer 190 aircraft.

In May 2012, Republic Airways agreed to fly the 28 Bombardier Q400s for United Express that bankrupt Pinnacle Airlines planned to return to its lessors. The Q400 fleet was retired in 2017.

Republic Airways Holdings signed a three-year contract in October 2012 with Caesars Entertainment Corporation where its Republic Airways subsidiary would operate five Embraer 190 aircraft to provide more than 1,500 charter flights annually for Caesars. Service began in January 2013. This contract ended in August 2015 and all E190 aircraft were sold or returned to the lease holders.

In January 2013, Republic Airways Holdings reached a capacity purchase agreement with American Airlines to operate 47 Embraer 175 airplanes under the American Eagle brand beginning in mid-2013. The regional jets would be deployed out of American's Chicago hub. In addition, Republic would have options to purchase an additional 47 Embraer aircraft beginning in 2015. Republic took first delivery of the E175 jets in July 2013 and service began August 1, 2013, from Chicago to New Orleans, Pittsburgh and Albuquerque. Republic began using Miami as an American Eagle hub in October 2014 and in New York-JFK in May 2015.

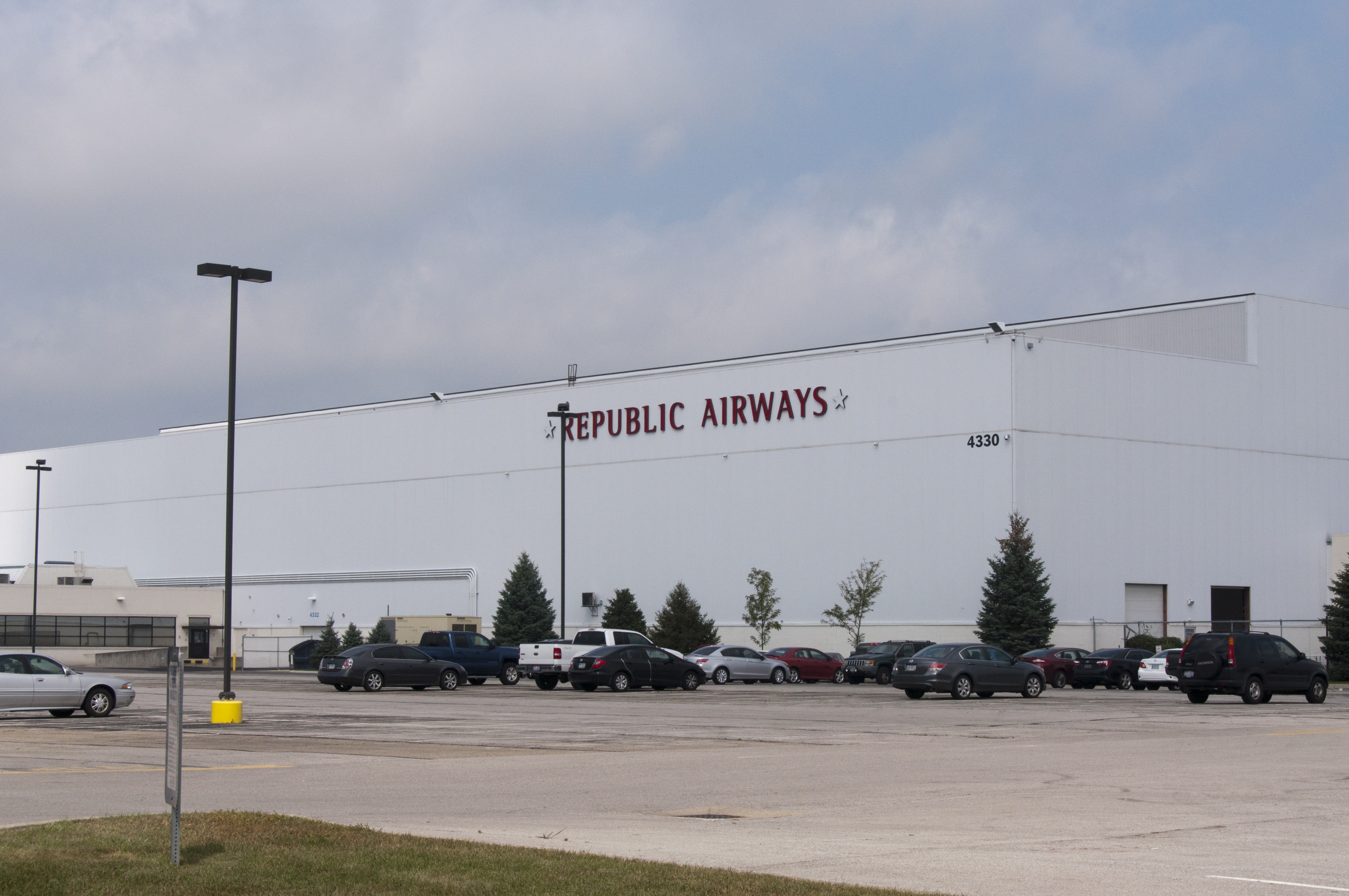
Republic Airways Maintenance Base in Columbus, Ohio

In late 2015, it was announced Republic Airways achieved approval from the FAA for Extended Overwater Operations (EOW), which allows Republic to operate up to 162 nautical miles from shore. As of January 31, 2017, only Republic 175 aircraft operating for American Airlines are equipped to operate as an EOW aircraft. American Airlines uses Republic to operate aircraft out of Miami International Airport to various Caribbean and Central American destinations, including the Bahamas, Mexico, Panama, Belize, Honduras, Costa Rica, Turks & Caicos, Cuba, Guadeloupe, and the French West Indies.

In late 2016, it was announced, due to the impending merger with Shuttle America, that the 80-seat Embraer 175s operated for American Eagle (previously US Airways Express) would have the last row of seats removed (4 in total) to conform with Delta's scope clause, which limits all regional jets to a maximum of 76 seats. These aircraft were retrofitted to American's standard Embraer 175 layout.

On January 31, 2017, all existing aircraft operating under the Shuttle America operating certificate were transferred to the Republic Airline Inc. operating certificate, thus ceasing operations for Shuttle America, and completing the merger process of both subsidiaries. The move made Republic the largest operator of Embraer 170 and Embraer 175 aircraft in the world, at the time.

On December 20, 2018, Republic Airways announced that it had finalized a firm order for 100 Embraer 175 aircraft, stating that deliveries for the new aircraft would start in the second half of 2020

In October 2019, Republic received the first of 30 E175s to be transferred from Compass Airlines upon the cancellation of their contract with Delta.

In September 2021, Republic agreed to sell 11 E170s and 6 E175s to Envoy Air.

=== Retired fleet ===
Republic Airways retired fleet
Aircraft	Total	Introduced	Retired	Notes
BAe Jetstream 31	19	1995	2001	Operated for Northwest Airlink.
Bombardier Q400	30	2012	2016	Operated for United Express.
Embraer ERJ-135	22	2002	2009	Operated for Delta Connection.
Embraer ERJ-140	15	2001	2014	Operated for American Eagle.
Embraer ERJ-145	68	2015	2021	Operated for Delta Connection.
Embraer 190	17	2009	2015	Operated for Frontier Airlines and Midwest Airlines.

== Incidents ==
- On April 9, 2017, a passenger was forced off of a Republic-operated United Express flight in Chicago bound for Louisville. The passenger was forced off the flight by Department of Aviation officers after he refused to give up his seat to an airline employee. He attempted to run back onto the aircraft, but was forcibly removed. A video posted on social media showing him being injured and dragged off the plane led to a public outcry against United Airlines.
- On June 21, 2018, a Republic-owned E170 registered N876RW was damaged by a fire while undergoing maintenance at John Glenn Columbus International Airport. The aircraft was deemed to be damaged beyond economical repair.
- On May 10, 2019, a Republic-owned E175 operating Delta Connection flight 5935 was heading towards New York's LaGuardia Airport when a suicidal passenger attempted to open a cabin door in mid-flight, causing the pilots to declare an emergency shortly before landing. The situation was brought under control, after which the plane landed safely and was met by law enforcement at the gate.
- On November 6, 2019, a Republic-owned E175 operating American Eagle Flight 4439 returned to Hartsfield-Jackson Atlanta International Airport after suffering severe controllability issues after takeoff: ATC flight data recorded the crew stating a "trim runaway" and a "stalling situation". The data shows the aircraft rapidly climbing to 15,100 ft (4,600 m) and slowing down to 160 knots (300 km/h) while performing nearly two full right turns.
- On June 4, 2022, a Republic-owned E175 operating American Eagle Flight 4837 from Indianapolis bound for Chicago-O'Hare, aborted its takeoff after an odor of smoke was reported in the aircraft. The aircraft was evacuated on a taxiway. No injuries were reported.
- On June 29, 2025, a Republic-owned E175 was involved in a ground incident at Boston Logan International Airport. A catering van operated by Sky Chefs Collided with the parked aircraft. The van was crushed and visible damage was seen on the aircraft's underbelly. The aircraft was unoccupied at the time and the van driver sustained only minor injuries.

== See also ==
- Air transportation in the United States
- Regional airline
- American Eagle
- United Express
- Delta Connection
- Delta Shuttle
