= Retribution principle =

Belief that righteous prosper while wicked suffer

The retribution principle (often abbreviated RP) is a term used in Ancient Near East studies and Old Testament studies to refer to various forms of the belief that the righteous will prosper while the wicked will suffer.
