= Chautauqua Airlines =

Regional airline of the United States (1973–2014)

IATA	ICAO	Call sign
RP	CHQ	CHAUTAUQUA
- Founded: May 3, 1973
- Commenced operations: August 1, 1974
- Ceased operations: December 31, 2014 (merged into Shuttle America)
- Hubs: As Delta Connection: New York–LaGuardia
- Frequent-flyer program: SkyMiles
- Alliance: SkyTeam
- Fleet size: 41
- Destinations: 52
- Parent company: Republic Airways Holdings
- Headquarters: Jamestown, Chautauqua County, New York (1973–1998); Indianapolis, Indiana (1998–2014)
- Key people: Bryan Bedford (CEO)
- Website: Archived official website at the Wayback Machine (archive index)

Chautauqua Airlines, Inc. was a regional airline in the United States and a subsidiary of Republic Airways Holdings based in Indianapolis, Indiana. Prior to the shut down of operations, it operated scheduled passenger services to 52 airports in the United States and Canada via a code sharing agreement for Delta Air Lines (as Delta Connection). Chautauqua previously flew feeder services for other airlines via code sharing agreements including Allegheny Airlines (as Allegheny Commuter), American Airlines (as AmericanConnection), America West Airlines (as America West Express), Continental Airlines (as Continental Express), Frontier Airlines (as Frontier Express), Trans World Airlines (as Trans World Express), United Airlines (as United Express) and US Airways (as US Airways Express). Its last day in operation was December 31, 2014, at which time all flying was absorbed by the Shuttle America certificate.

Chautauqua had crew bases at LaGuardia Airport, John F. Kennedy International Airport, Louisville International Airport, and Port Columbus International Airport.

== History ==
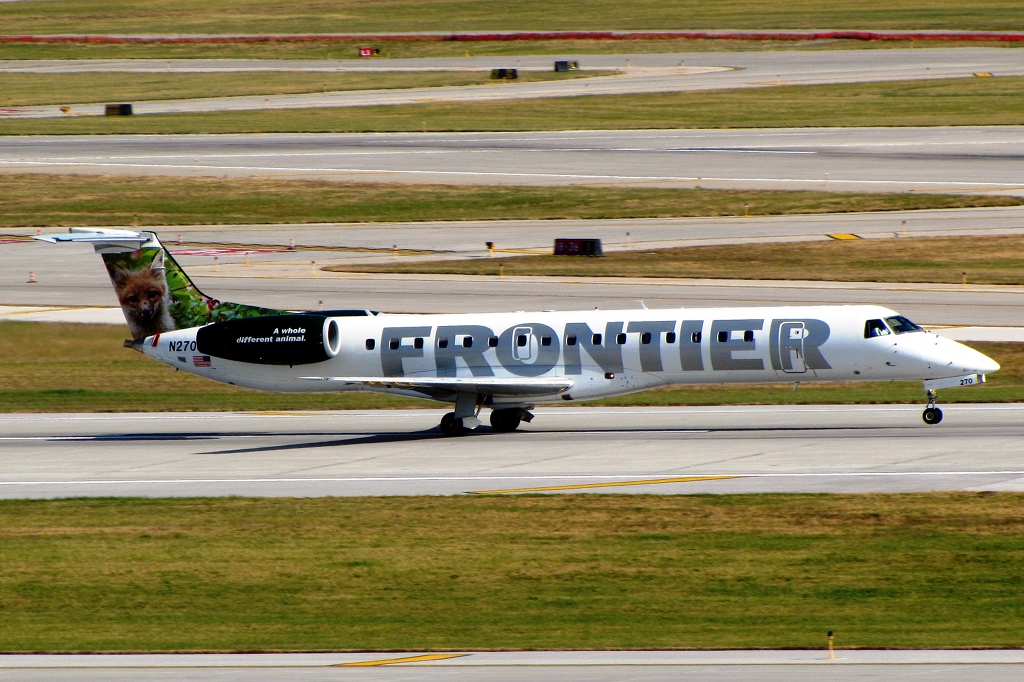
Frontier Express ERJ 145 operated by Chautauqua in 2011

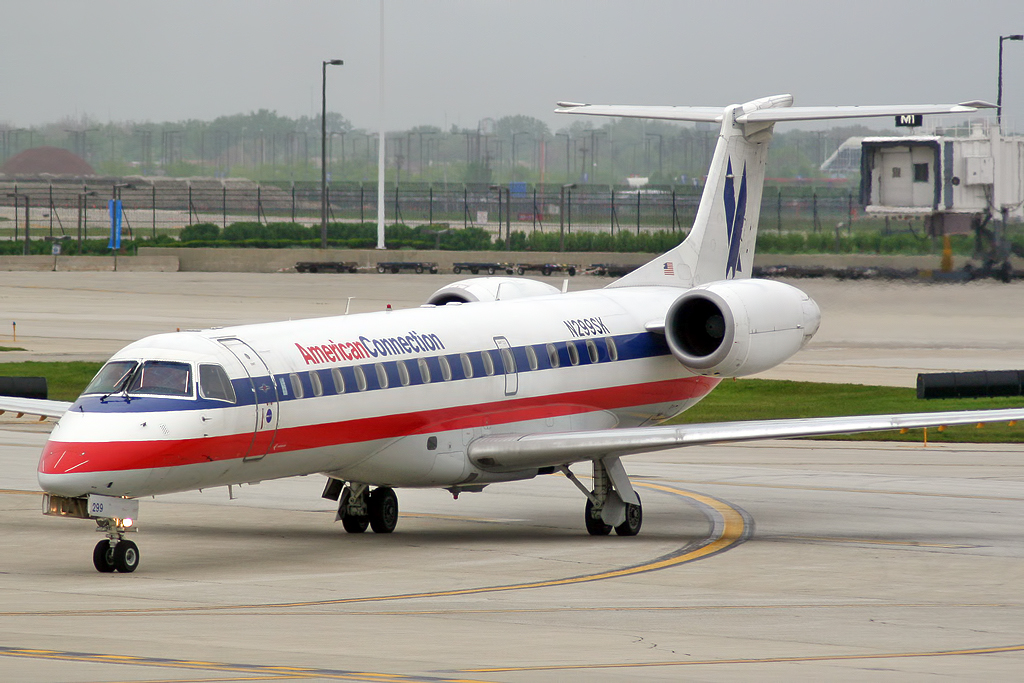
AmericanConnection ERJ 140 operated by Chautauqua in 2012

Republic Airways Holdings traces it roots to Chautauqua. See also: History of Republic Airways Holdings

The airline was established on May 3, 1973, in Jamestown, Chautauqua County, New York, USA, and started operations on August 1, 1974, using two 15-passenger Beechcraft 99 turboprop commuter aircraft. Chautauqua operated the Beechcraft 99 in Allegheny Commuter service and later as USAir Express. In 1984, the airline grew by adding five 19-passenger Fairchild Metroliner III aircraft to its fleet. In 1986, Chautauqua Airlines was purchased by GAC, an affiliate of Guarantee Security Life Insurance Company, and added twelve 30-passenger Saab 340 aircraft to replace slower Shorts 3-30s in the fleet.

Chautauqua was one of the last remaining companies still in business that once flew as a part of Allegheny Commuter, one of the first regional franchisee systems combining independent regional and commuter airlines under one brand. It no longer services the Chautauqua County-Jamestown Airport from which it began.

Chautauqua was acquired by Wexford Management in January 1998 and was subsequently realigned under a holding company, Republic Airways Holdings.

=== Build up ===
In 1998, Chautauqua entered into an agreement with Embraer for the purchase of ten 50-seat ERJ 145 regional jet aircraft. In 1999, Chautauqua entered into a 10-year code-share agreement with Trans World Airlines to operate at least 15 ERJ 145s for the airline. In June 2001, American Airlines, who had purchased TWA, renewed the existing regional jet service with Chautauqua for feeder service in St. Louis using 44-seat ERJ 140 aircraft. In March 2001, Chautauqua entered into a partnership with America West to operate as an America West Express affiliate using 12 ERJ 145 jets in the Eastern United States, but ended this service in February 2003. In November 2002, Chautauqua began flying regional jet service to Florida for Delta Air Lines. In March 2004, United Airlines announced that Chautauqua Airlines would operate 16 50-seat regional jets for United Express.

In 2004, Republic Airways Holdings announced a new jet-service agreement with US Airways for the operation of Embraer 170 and Embraer 190 aircraft. Chautauqua was one of the first U.S. operators of the Embraer 170, but was forced to transfer these aircraft to sister company Shuttle America in 2005, after the pilots' union at American Airlines claimed the aircraft violated a "scope clause" regulating the size of regional aircraft operated under American brands. In the first half of 2007, Chautauqua took delivery of 24 Bombardier CRJ200s and flew them under a code-share agreement with Continental Airlines. Some of these aircraft were previously owned by Atlantic Coast Airlines (Independence Air), and some were owned by Comair. Chautauqua eventually phased out all of its CRJ200s.

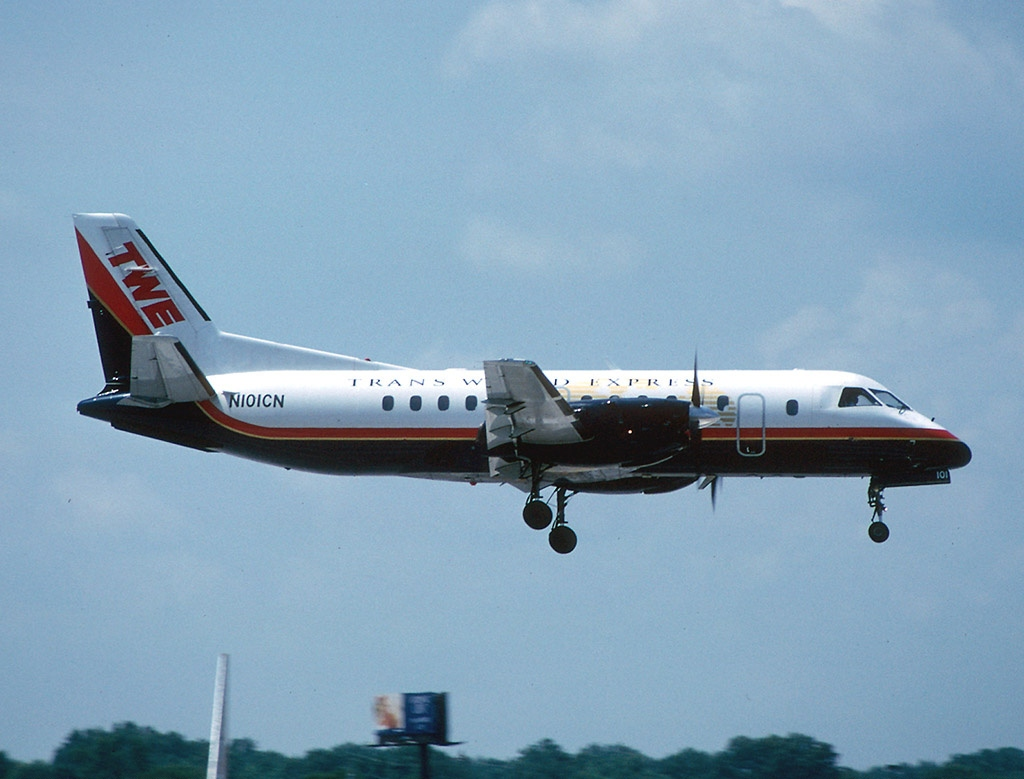
Trans World Express Saab 340 operated by Chautauqua in 2001

In early 2006, Chautauqua opened its new aircraft maintenance complex, capable of holding nine aircraft, at Louisville International Airport in Louisville, Kentucky. Maintenance was performed in Indianapolis, Columbus, Louisville, and St. Louis. The ERJ 135/140/145 heavy ("C-check") maintenance was performed in Columbus.

In April 2010, the Federal Aviation Administration proposed a US$348,000 fine against Chautauqua Airlines for allegedly not performing required inspections for three years. The FAA alleged that the airline flew an Embraer 145 jet for 43 days past the time one of its inertial navigation units should have been replaced.

=== Wind down ===
In October 2012, Republic Airways Holdings reworked a deal with partner Delta Air Lines, part of the company's broader effort to trim costs and boost revenue amid a decline in demand for regional airline service, to operate seven additional 50-seat ERJ 145 planes under the Delta Connection brand.

In the spring of 2014, Republic Airways Holdings announced that it would begin to pull down much of Chautauqua's flying. Specifically, it would not renew its contract with United Airlines to fly ERJ 145s out of Cleveland and that it would ground all 14 ERJ 145s on April 1, in response to a shortage of qualified pilots. This was shortly followed by an announcement that it would also not seek renewal of its AmericanConnection contract. Chautauqua's operation as AmericanConnection ended on August 18, 2014.

On July 28, 2014, Republic Airways Holdings announced that Chautauqua Airlines would be absorbed into Shuttle America "by year-end" to reduce costs. Chautauqua's only remaining aircraft, 41 ERJ 145s, were transferred to the Shuttle America operating certificate, effectively abandoning Chautauqua's operating certificate. On December 31, 2014, Chautauqua operated its last flight for Delta Connection. All crew and maintenance bases were absorbed by the Shuttle America certificate.

== Fleet ==
As of December 2014, the Chautauqua Airlines fleet consisted of the following aircraft:

Aircraft	Total	Orders	Passengers				Operated for	Notes
Aircraft	Total	Orders	F	Y+	Y	Total	Operated for	Notes
Embraer ERJ 145	31	—	—	—	50	50	Delta Connection	
Embraer ERJ 145	10	—	—	—	50	50	Chautauqua Airlines	Unallocated spare aircraft.
Total	41	—						

== Awards ==
Year	Organization	Award
2004	Air Transport World (ATW) Industry Achievement Awards	Regional Airline of the Year
2004	Regional Airline World	Regional Airline of the Year
2004	Regional Airline World	Airline Executive of the Year (President & CEO Bryan Bedford)
2006	Flight International	Aviation Excellence Award
2008	Air Transport World (ATW) Industry Achievement Awards	Regional Airline of the Year

== See also ==
- List of defunct airlines of the United States
