= Rock paper scissors (disambiguation) =

Rock paper scissors, or paper scissors rock, is an intransitive hand game played between two or more people.

Rock, Paper, Scissors or other combinations may also refer to:

== Movies and TV shows ==
- Rock, Paper, Scissors (2012 film), a Venezuelan drama film
- Rock Paper Scissors (2013 film), a Canadian thriller film
- Rock, Paper, Scissors (2017 film), an American psychological thriller film
- Rock Paper Scissors (TV series), a 2023 Nickelodeon animated series
- Rock, Paper, Scissors (2024 film), a British BAFTA-winning short film

== Music ==
- Rock Paper Scissors (album), a 2008 album by Noah23
- Scissors, Paper, Rock!, a 2008 album by The Axis of Awesome
- Paper, Scissors, Rock (song), a 2011 song by Chris Brown*

== Novels ==
- Rock Paper Scissors (novel), a 2021 psychological thriller novel by Alice Feeney
- Rock, Paper, Scissors (novel), a 2015 translation of Sten saks papir (2012) by Naja Marie Aidt
- Scissors, Paper, Rock, a 1994 novel by Fenton Johnson
