= National Airlines (1999–2002) =

Las Vegas, Nevada-based airline (1999–2002)

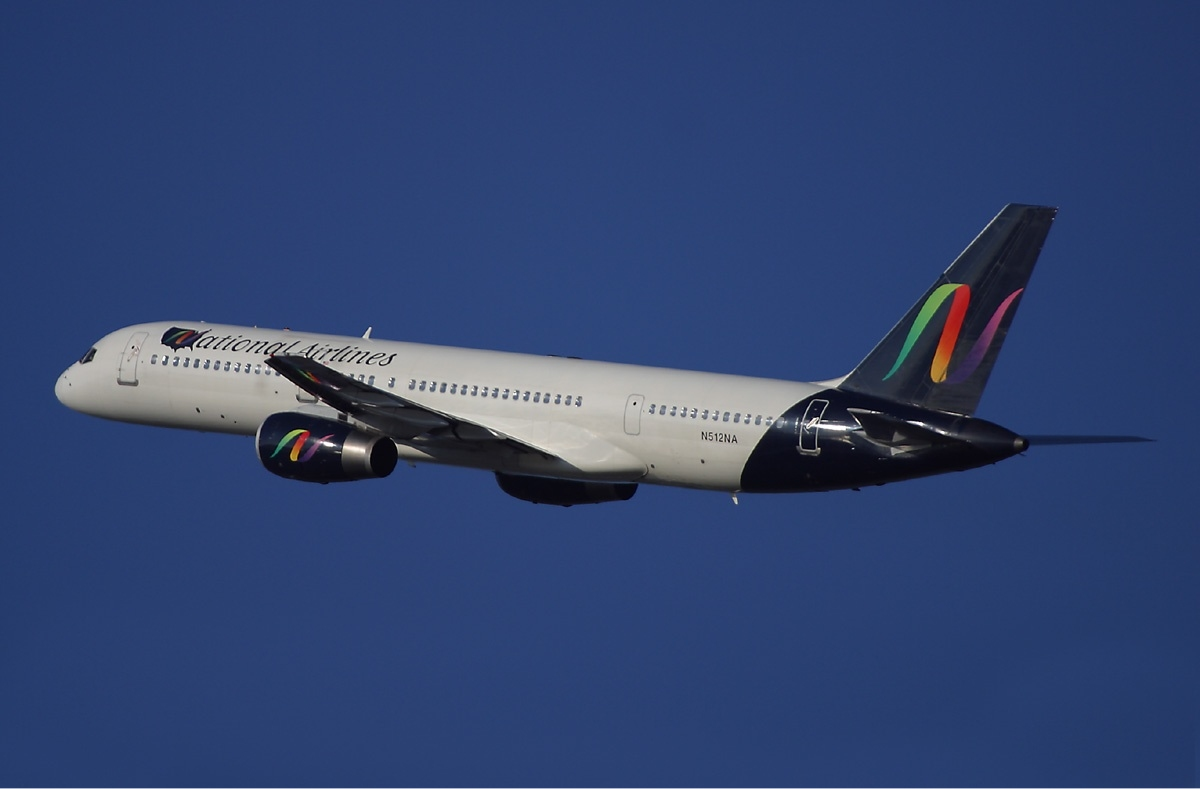
IATA	ICAO	Call sign
N7	ROK	RED ROCK
- Founded: July 1998; 28 years ago
- Commenced operations: May 27, 1999; 27 years ago
- Ceased operations: November 6, 2002; 23 years ago
- Hubs: McCarran International Airport
- Frequent-flyer program: National Comps
- Fleet size: 19
- Destinations: 14
- Headquarters: Las Vegas, Nevada, U.S.
- Key people: Michael Conway (president & CEO)
- Website: nationalairlines.com (2001 archive)

National Airlines was a short lived American low-fare airline that operated from 1999 to 2002. Headquartered in Las Vegas, Nevada, it was the third US carrier to use the name. The airline was established to transport tourists to Las Vegas, providing services to a select number of cities with high traffic.

== History ==
Hoping to attract more visitors from the East Coast, Harrah's Entertainment and the former Rio Hotel & Casino, Inc. each contributed $15 million toward the start-up costs of National Airlines in July 1998. Wexford Capital, owners of Republic Airways Holdings, also contributed several million dollars to create the airline.

Taking a page from Southwest Airlines' book, National kept operations simple by operating a single aircraft type—in National's case, the Boeing 757.

Service began on May 27, 1999. This was the third airline in the United States to use the "National Airlines" name. Michael Conway became president and CEO of the company. From its inception, the company fought an uphill battle against rising fuel costs and an economic recession. National Airlines filed for Chapter 11 bankruptcy protection on December 6, 2000.

Like many other airlines, National had serious financial problems after the September 11 attacks in 2001, and only 41 months after their inaugural flight left Las Vegas' McCarran International Airport, the airline ceased all operations on November 6, 2002, after being in Chapter 11 bankruptcy for 23 months.

As of the day of National's grounding, the airline had carried 1.85 million passengers through McCarran (January–November 2002), and National was the airport's fourth-largest carrier based upon passenger volume. Departing McCarran International Airport at 4:20 p.m., National Airlines Flight 354 to Dallas/Fort Worth was the carrier's last to leave the Las Vegas hub.

== Attempted hijacking ==
On July 27, 2000, National Airlines flight 19 operating from John F. Kennedy International Airport to McCarran International Airport was boarded by a man with a gun and knife, who immediately stormed the cockpit and took the two pilots hostage. The hijacker demanded that the flight attendant close the cabin door; however, startled passengers shoved the flight attendant aside and reopened the door to escape. All 143 passengers exited without injuries. By 12:50 AM, both pilots were released. The hijacker remained on the plane alone for another two and a half hours before being apprehended. The FBI identified the suspect as Aaron Amartei Commey of Milwaukee. His motive was to be flown to Argentina or Antarctica. He was charged with attempting to hijack an aircraft.

== In popular culture ==
In the science entertainment television program MythBusters, a stored National Airlines 757 following its collapse is shown on camera taxiing away. They were going to use it to test a myth about the effects of jet wash on vehicles behind an airplane taking off. The MythBusters were unable to use the jet because of a dispute with their insurance company.

== Destinations ==
At the time National Airlines was grounded, the airline provided service to 14 destinations throughout the United States:

- California
  - Los Angeles (Los Angeles International Airport)
  - San Francisco (San Francisco International Airport)
- Florida
  - Miami (Miami International Airport)
- Illinois
  - Chicago
    - (Chicago Midway International Airport)
    - (Chicago O'Hare International Airport)
- New Jersey
  - Newark (Newark Liberty International Airport)
- New York
  - New York (John F. Kennedy International Airport)
- Nevada
  - Las Vegas (McCarran International Airport) Hub
  - Reno (Reno-Tahoe International Airport)
- Pennsylvania
  - Philadelphia (Philadelphia International Airport)
- Texas
  - Dallas/Fort Worth (Dallas/Fort Worth International Airport)
- Virginia
  - Arlington (Ronald Reagan Washington National Airport)
  - Dulles (Washington Dulles International Airport)
- Washington
  - Seattle (Seattle-Tacoma International Airport)

== Fleet ==
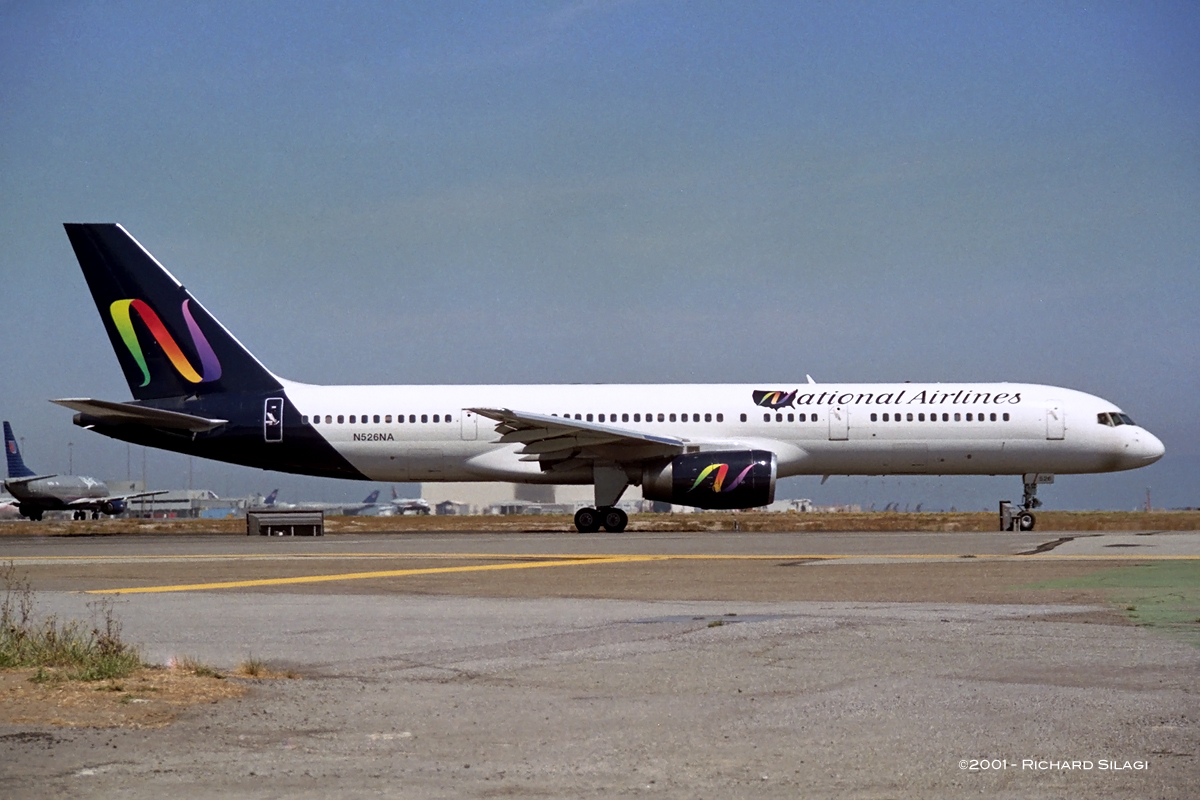
National Boeing 757

At the time the airline was grounded, National consisted of the following aircraft:

Aircraft	Total	Passengers			Notes
Aircraft	Total	F	Y	Total	Notes
Boeing 757-200	19	22	153	175	National's cabins provided coach seats at 33" and first class at 40". A greater pitch than that of most legacy carriers at the time.

== See also ==
- List of defunct airlines of the United States
