= Regulated Product Submissions =

Health standard

Regulated Product Submission (RPS) is a Health Level Seven (HL7) standard designed to facilitate the processing and review of regulated product information. RPS is being developed in response to performance goals that the U.S. Food and Drug Administration (FDA) is to achieve by 2012, as outlined in the Prescription Drug User Fee Act (PDUFA). In addition to the U.S., regulatory agencies from Europe, Canada, and Japan are at varying levels of interest and participation. Currently, the second release of RPS is in development.

== Goal of RPS ==
Authorities such as the FDA receive numerous submissions that address a variety of regulatory issues. The information contained in these submissions is divided into large numbers of files, both paper and electronic. Often, files in one submission are related to files in earlier submissions. Because the information is divided into numerous files sent over time, it can be difficult to efficiently process and review the information.

While the general data layouts of all regulated products are the same, different product types have different lists of topics that must be addressed within the submission. Therefore, the goal of RPS is to create an HL7 XML message standard for submitting information to regulatory authorities. Each message includes the contents of a regulatory submission plus information such as metadata, which is necessary to process submissions. The Refined Message Information Model (R-MIM) shows the structure of a message as a color-coded diagram. R-MIM diagrams are designed to capture all required information for the efficient processing and review of regulatory submissions and to explain what each message consists of. This makes RPS general enough to handle all regulated products while containing enough information to allow regulators to support structured review.

== Origins ==
The project to develop a regulated product submission standard was initiated on June 22, 2005. Release 1 was spearheaded by Jason Rock of GlobalSubmit, with the aim of creating one standardized submission format to support all of the FDA's electronic product submissions. The Health Level 7 message was created by leveraging existing human pharmaceutical experience, such as The International Conference on Harmonisation of Technical Requirements for Registration of Pharmaceuticals for Human Use (ICH). RPS Release 1 provides the capability to cross-reference previously submitted material owned by the sponsor as well as append, replace and delete parts of the document lifecycle. Release 2, led by Peggy Leizear of the Office of Planning at the FDA, grants the ability to exchange contact information, classify submission content and handle multi-region submissions. The second release of RPS also handles two-way communication—The regulatory authority (e.g. FDA) will use RPS to send correspondence (e.g. request for additional information, meeting minutes, application approval) to the submitter.

== RPS structure ==
As the industry moves away from paper submissions, global companies producing regulated products will benefit from having a published electronic submission standard. The label of “regulated product” applies not only to pharmaceuticals, but also extends to include food additives, medical devices and radiologics, human therapeutics, biologics, tobacco products and veterinary products.

The submitted information is structured as a collection of documents, organized by report sections. Multiple documents can be assigned to a single report section. The actual table of required and optional report sections varies from product to product and is defined by regulatory authorities. Since the same information can be submitted to support multiple applications, it is imperative that RPS allow for the reuse of data between applications.

== RPS and eCTD ==
RPS is in many ways comparable to the electronic Common Technical Document. Ideally, the FDA would like to implement RPS as the next iteration of eCTD. The idea behind RPS and ICH’s eCTD is the same—the use of a standardized format for regulatory submissions, including PDF documents and SAS datasets. Although document contents are the same for eCTD and RPS, the internal XML structures are very different. RPS will offer two obvious advantages over eCTD. First, RPS will establish two-way communication between the submitter and all FDA-regulated product centers within the agency. Second, RPS will manage the life cycle of submissions by allowing cross-referencing of previously submitted information. This means that for electronic Investigational New Drug (IND) applications, New Drug Applications (NDA), and Biologic License Applications (BLAs), information need only be submitted once and previously submitted electronic documents can be applied to marketing applications. With RPS, archived electronic IND, NDA, and BLA submissions will be retrievable through standardized automated links. eCTD lacks this cross-referencing capability.

== Future releases and implementation ==
Release 3 will be headed by ICH. The goal of release three is to have more international requirements. The HL7 standard will be implemented first at the Center for Drug Evaluation and Research (CDER) and Center for Biologics Evaluation and Research (CBER) in late 2011, before being rolled out to the other centers using a yet-to-be-determined schedule. Both centers will implement Release 2 of RPS, which barely passed ballot as a Draft Standard for Trial Use (DSTU) in January 2010. The ballot passed by two votes with a result of 53 affirmative and 33 negative. Testing by FDA is expected to begin at the beginning of the third quarter, 2010. When RPS is implemented, FDA will offer a training program for reviewers, including hands-on training classes.
