= David Grizzle =

American businessperson

David Grizzle is a business executive with experience in the airline and aerospace industries and founder of Dazzle Partners, LLC. and served as Chief Operating Officer for the Federal Aviation Administration (FAA), overseeing the United States air traffic control system. He has also served as Acting Deputy Administrator of the FAA and Senior Vice President of Continental Airlines.

== Education ==
David Grizzle went to Harvard University, where he earned a bachelor's degree in government and a Juris Doctor degree.

== Career ==
Grizzle has led transactions including the SkyTeam Alliance on behalf of Continental Airlines and he mediated the relationship between the FAA's unions and management. He owns a private consultancy, Dazzle Partners.

Grizzle spent a significant part of his career with Texas Air Corporation (later Continental Airlines). During his 23 years at Continental, Grizzle was in charge of the marketing, strategic planning and international alliances divisions, and an early champion of the SkyTeam global alliance

In 2004, Grizzle served the State Department for 14 months as part of the U.S. Government's reconstruction efforts in Afghanistan, overseeing aviation, roads, power and communication reconstruction projects. After his time with the State Department, Grizzle returned to Continental where he founded the Customer Experience division.

In 2009, Grizzle was appointed by President Obama to serve as Chief Counsel for the FAA. Until his departure in 2013, Grizzle's roles within the FAA included Acting Deputy Administrator and Chief Operating Officer. In his role as COO, Grizzle headed up Air Traffic Control.

== Family ==
Grizzle and his wife, Anne, are parents to three adult sons and eight grandchildren.
