= Guarantee Security Life Insurance Company =

American life insurance company

- Industry: Insurance
- Defunct: 1991
- Fate: Collapse
- Headquarters: Jacksonville, Florida
- Key people: Mark Sanford; William Blackburn

Guarantee Security Life Insurance Company, or GSLIC, represented one of the most severe cases of insurance fraud in Florida history. According to the Florida Insurance Commissioner:

[GSLIC] was, almost from the beginning, a massive fraud, aided and abetted by blue-ribbon brokers and licensed professionals motivated by their own self-interest. The fraud at Guaranteed Security was a carefully orchestrated bank robbery. But the thieves disguised themselves with the help of accountants and brokers and lawyers rather than wearing silk-stocking masks.

The allegations by Florida insurance regulators against accounting firm Coopers & Lybrand ultimately led to a $4.5 million settlement. The U.S. Securities and Exchange Commission found that Merrill Lynch "failed to properly record the terms and conditions of certain transactions which involved the sale and repurchase of certain securities" and ordered that Merrill adopt procedures and controls to ensure compliance with the SEC's book's and record provisions and "cease and desist" from committing future violations. A $100 million settlement was reached between the Florida Department of Insurance and firms associated with the 1991 collapse of GSLIC.

== Background ==
In 1978, Mark Sanford and William Blackburn were working as stockbrokers in Louisville, Kentucky when they decided to form their own company, Transmark USA, Inc. In 1984, Transmark purchased Guarantee Security Life Insurance Company (GSLIC) of Jacksonville, Florida. The two men moved to the Sunshine State, Blackburn taking charge of daily operations, while Sanford managed the investment portfolio.

GSLIC's primary products were deferred annuities and life insurance policies. The firm marketed these products through a national sales force of over 16,000 highly commissioned insurance agents. However, customers were attracted to the products by the promised 8% interest rate (at a time when the going rate was 8%), which was guaranteed for the first year. According to a sales brochure, customers were also protected against loss of their investment: "The principal is fully guaranteed. It is not subject to losses created by market fluctuations."

Customers soon found there were drawbacks to the policies. The interest rates paid after the first year dropped dramatically. However, annuitants were discouraged from withdrawing their money by high cancellation penalties ($1,000 for a $10,000 investment).

Between 1984 and 1991, the company grew from less than $100 million to almost $1 billion in assets and had about 57,000 policyholders in 42 states. In December 1986, Transmark raised $50 million through a private placement of 13% senior notes arranged by Drexel Burnham. Abraham J. Briloff notes, "The purchasers included institutions with close ties to now imprisoned junkmeister Michael Milken -- notably Columbia Savings & Loan, CenTrust and Imperial Savings & Loan." The Milken brothers' involvement in the GSLIC transactions eventually led to their being sued by the state of Florida for $225 million.

In 1991, the company went insolvent and stopped writing new policies. Consequently, the State of Florida established a receivership to take control of the company. The receiver paid the contractual minimum crediting rate, which for most policyholders was 4%. Policyholders were given the option to transfer to Guaranty Reassurance Corp., the industry-run restoration company, or face stiff surrender charges, lose the possibility of sharing in potential court awards, and receive only 32 cents on the dollar. About 42,000 of the original 55,000 policyholders ultimately transferred to Midland National Insurance Company.

The state determined that it would only guarantee policy values up to a total of $100,000, based not on who the buyer was, but on the insured. This impacted policyholders such as William Underwood, who had paid $50,000 for a single-premium annuity in 1987, and convinced his mother and mother-in-law to invest $40,000 each in their own annuity, naming him as the insured. Underwood stated, "I'd like to wring the agent's neck and damn those guys who did the hanky-panky."

== Government investigation ==
On December 20, 1991, the State of Florida filed a 17-count suit against GSLIC's executives, accountants, lawyers, and brokers charging "breach of fiduciary duty, negligence, breach of contract, waste of corporate assets and conspiracy to defraud." The State of Florida sought and obtained a court order freezing Chairman Mark Sanford's assets, after finding that he had purchased a Bahamian island, Rudder Cut Cay, with company funds and begun minting his own coins bearing his likeness on one side and that of his bikini-clad wife on the other.

His assets also included a million-dollar Ponte Vedra Beach oceanfront home, two $165,000 Lamborghini Countachs, a Rolls-Royce, a Corvette, a Jaguar, and a speedboat. Sanford also invested in a chain of nude dance bars.

Sanford's island, which had a private airstrip, a natural harbor, two miles of beaches and a 3,200-square-foot main house, was sold by the state to a Chicago businessman for $6.1 million.

The sheer magnitude of the fraud – involving the collapse of what was then Florida's sixth-largest insurer – attracted Congress's attention. On April 29–30, 1992, the U.S. Senate Permanent Subcommittee on Investigations held hearings on GSLIC, as part of an investigation titled "Efforts to Combat Fraud and Abuse in the Insurance Industry." Chairman Sam Nunn called several of GSLIC's executives, accountants, brokers, customers, and regulators to the stand to testify. Sanford declined to answer any questions, invoking his right against self-incrimination. Based on other evidence, however, the subcommittee concluded that the regulatory safeguards against insurance fraud and abuse had failed on a monumental scale.

Company records revealed that GSLIC's assets had been systematically looted by Transmark management in the form of excessive salary and dividends. Transmark Chairman Mark Sanford took $37 million; Transmark, $23 million; GSLIC President William Blackburn, $17 million; Sanford's brother Rob, $2 million; Blackburn's wife Melanie, $700,000; and Sanford's wife Margena, $600,000. Together they looted the company of more than $80 million.

In order to finance the lavish executive salaries while still paying the annuities and insurance agent commissions, GSLIC management invested in high-yield, high-risk junk bonds. In 1991, the junk bond market collapsed, causing the company to become insolvent. In testimony before the Senate, GSLIC's Deputy Receiver estimated the fair value of the company's assets at $230 million. Obligations to its policyholders and annuitants totaled $620 million.

== Chronology ==
In 1984, Mark Sanford ran into trouble when his efforts to raise capital clashed with Florida insurance regulations. To protect policyholders, the statutes required insurers to maintain a reserve totaling 20% of the total amount invested in high-risk investments. The reserve is recorded as a liability, and would have caused GSLIC to become insolvent. To circumvent the regulations, Sanford made an oral arrangement with Merrill Lynch to sell the junk bonds on December 31, 1984 in exchange for a $155 million "account receivable due from brokers" and repurchase the bonds on January 2, 1985 for the same amount, plus a fee.

In 1985, Sanford refined his scheme to eliminate several problems. These issues included the creation of a suspicious, huge account receivable that was never funded, and the questionable legality of a transaction never consummated by a cash transfer. On December 31, 1985, Sanford attempted to sell $246 million in junk bonds to Merrill Lynch in exchange for U.S. Treasury bonds (which do not require a reserve due to their risk-free status). However, Merrill Lynch's computer system recorded the transaction as of January 2, 1986 – too late to help GSLIC's balance sheet. So Sanford's assistant arranged for Merrill Lynch to doctor the records by issuing a written confirmation that the trade actually occurred December 31, 1985.

In 1986, Sanford tried a different scheme. According to the State of Florida's complaint, Southeast Bank – at the insurer's request – falsified its December 31, 1986 portfolio summary. Abraham J. Briloff, CPA, noted, "The change made it appear that the bank was holding $292 million in Treasury bonds for GSLIC on that date, even though the bonds weren't in the bank's possession." Southeast Bank employees manually typed a 15-page confirmation summary.

In 1987, GSLIC did not make any year-end sales, probably because it had just issued $100 million in preferred stock, bringing sufficient cash to its bottom line. Altogether, Merrill Lynch received fees of about $25,000 at yearend 1984, $75,000 at yearend 1985, $150,000 at yearend 1986, and $106,000 at yearend 1988 for its part in the yearend bond transactions.

In 1988, Transmark underwent major changes in management. William Blackburn sold his one-third interest in Transmark to Sanford. According to his testimony, "I was not interested in continuing that relationship since Mr. Sanford and I had different views about the future direction of the company."

In 1988 and 1989, Transmark also acquired retail, printing, and plastics companies, facilitating a convoluted arrangement (designed by law firm Shereff, Friedman, Hoffman and Goodman) in which GSLIC was able to exceed the legal limits on investment in affiliates. Transmark created a holding company called CG Acquisition USA and issued CG's one share of common stock to a company officer. This officer in turn granted Transmark an option to reacquire the share, executed a shareholder agreement granting Transmark the right to appoint CG directors, and gave Transmark a warrant to acquire 99 shares of CG common stock. This allowed Transmark was able to retain control over the companies while still holding them out as unaffiliated companies and listing the investment as a $19 million asset.

In 1989, Sanford began using these subsidiary companies to count assets twice on GSLIC's balance sheet. An example is GSLIC's loan of $25 million to the airline group. That same day, the airline paid Transmark $17 million in dividends, and Transmark in turn paid it to GSLIC as gross paid-in and contributed surplus. Thus, GSLIC was able to count the same asset twice – once as a loan receivable to the airline, and again as contributed surplus from Transmark. GSLIC also made a loan of $44 million to the printing group, which resulted in Transmark giving another $19 million of paid-in capital to GSLIC.

In 1990, Sanford pursued another circular arrangement in which he caused the subsidiaries to issue $27.5 million in preferred stock, which was simply given to GSLIC to enhance its balance sheet. The combined result of these schemes was that the retail, airline and printing operations' debts exceeded their assets by $35 million, but they were carried at face value on Transmark's balance sheet at $120 million. According to a complaint by Florida regulators, the law firm of Shereff, Friedman, Hoffman was the "architect" of these recapitalizations.

In 1991, the company went broke. William Blackburn testified, "Everything went wrong after I left. The most significant event, I can speculate, is the junk market crash in 1989."

== The auditors' work ==
In early 1985, Mark Sanford hired Coopers & Lybrand to audit GSLIC's 1984 financial statements based on Generally Accepted Accounting Principles (GAAP). Don Withers refused to recognize the year-end sales under GAAP, noting, "in today's environment I can not get anyone to agree that a period of time of less than 10-15 days would be sufficient to expose the Company to sufficient investment risk to entitle you to recognize the gain on the transaction." As a result, Mark Sanford became angry and fired the accounting firm.

Later in 1985, GSLIC engaged Coopers to audit GSLIC's 1985 statements based on statutory accounting rules. Coopers found that under statutory accounting, a 10-15 day period is not needed to recognize a sale of bonds: "as long as GSLIC does not have any legal obligation to reacquire the securities and will reacquire the securities at their fair market value, the sales should be recognized for statutory accounting purposes along with any corresponding gain or less." Sanford assured Withers that Florida insurance regulators had approved the year-end transactions. As a result, Coopers issued a clean audit report.

== Congressional findings ==
Rep. John Dingell's United States House Energy Subcommittee on Oversight and Investigations held hearings on the matter.

The Senate subcommittee issued several recommendations for tightening up statutory accounting. These include a requirement that auditors contact state regulators regarding misleading financial transactions; the use of GAAP for determining the financial soundness of insurance companies; and review of quarterly financial statements by insurance regulators.

In reference to the auditors, Senator John Glenn made this statement on March 3, 1993:

The Subcommittee finds that Coopers and Lybrand accepted and relied upon the representations by GSLIC management that Florida regulators were aware of the year-end transactions and had approved them. The Subcommittee believes that as independent auditors, Coopers & Lybrand had an obligation to verify this information for itself. In doing so, the auditors could have discussed with the Florida Insurance Commissioner the true effect of the year-end transactions, including the fact that proper MSVR was not being calculated and set aside for the protection of policyholders. If they had done so, perhaps they would not be party to the unfortunate situation faced by thousands of policyholders today.

== Other sources ==
- Arens, Alvin A., et al., Auditing and Assurance Services, Prentice Hall, 2003.
- Blackburn, William, GSLIC President, Testimony before the Permanent Subcommittee on Investigations Hearings on Efforts to Combat Fraud and Abuse in the Insurance Industry, Part V, April 30, 1992.
- Complaint, 17 counts, filed December 20, 1991, by the State of Florida Department of Insurance.
- Confirmation Memo of Merrill Lynch Capital Markets to Guaranty (sic) Insurance Co, regarding purchase of $5 million in U.S. Government Treasury Notes.
- Heekin, Michael, Deputy Receiver for GSLIC, Testimony before the Permanent Subcommittee on Investigations Hearings on Efforts to Combat Fraud and Abuse in the Insurance Industry, Part V, April 29, 1992.
- Letter to Mark Sanford, Guarantee Security Life Insurance Company, from Donald F. Withers, Coopers & Lybrand, dated November 20, 1985, regarding accounting treatment for end-of-year securities transactions.
- Letter to Rob Sandford (sic), Guarantee Security Life Insurance Company, from Don Withers, Coopers & Lybrand, dated April 5, 1985, regarding accounting treatment for end-of-year securities transactions.
- Marketing brochure prepared by Guarantee Security Life Insurance Company, regarding "The Enhancer" annuity product.
- "Now That We've Got It, We Pause Briefly to Flaunt It," GSLIC recruiting ad, 1987.
- Rogers, Helen. P., Certified Financial Planner, "Taking a Stand on Banking", wellingtonpublications.com.
- S. Rpt. 103-29: Third Interim Report on United States Government Efforts to Combat Fraud and Abuse in the Insurance Industry: Enhancing Solvency, Regulation and Disclosure Requirements – A Case Study of Guarantee Security Life Insurance Company, March 23, 1993, Page 5
- Watkins, Lucille, Policyholder, Testimony before the Permanent Subcommittee on Investigations Hearings on Efforts to Combat Fraud and Abuse in the Insurance Industry, Part V, April 29, 1992.
- Withers, Don, Coopers & Lybrand, Testimony before the Permanent Subcommittee on Investigations Hearings on Efforts to Combat Fraud and Abuse in the Insurance Industry, Part V, April 29, 1992.
