= Colgan Air =

Regional airline of the United States (1965–2012)

| IATA | ICAO | Call sign |
|---|---|---|
| 9L | CJC | COLGAN |
- Founded: 1965 (as Colgan Airways)
- Commenced operations: December 1, 1991
- Ceased operations: September 5, 2012
- Hubs: Boston; Houston–Intercontinental; Newark; New York–LaGuardia; Washington–Dulles
- Frequent-flyer program: Dividend Miles (US Airways); MileagePlus (United); OnePass (Continental)
- Alliance: SkyTeam (Continental); Star Alliance (Continental/United/US Airways)
- Parent company: Pinnacle Airlines Corp. (2007–2012)
- Headquarters: Manassas, Virginia (1965–2010); Memphis, Tennessee (2010–2012)
- Key people: John Spanjers (senior vice-president)
- Founder: Charles J. Colgan (former CEO)

Colgan Air was a regional airline in the United States that operated from 1965 until 2012, when it became a subsidiary of Pinnacle Airlines Corp. The initial headquarters of Colgan Air was in Manassas, Virginia until 2010, and then Memphis, Tennessee until closure in 2012.

Colgan Air operated for Continental Express/United Express, and US Airways Express. Pinnacle Airlines Corporation phased out the Colgan Air name on September 5, 2012, and transferred personnel and logistics to Pinnacle Airlines.

== History ==
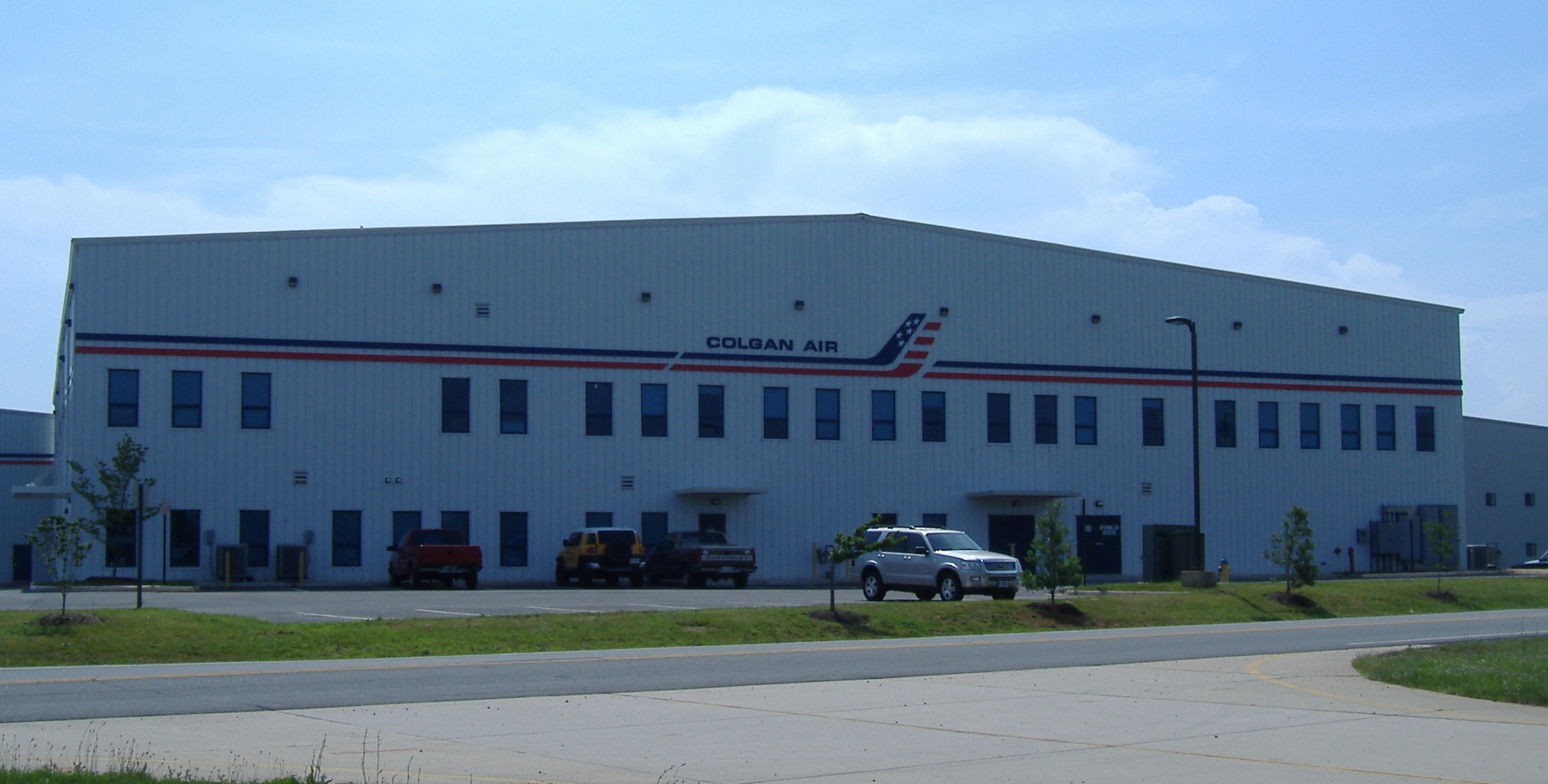
The Colgan Air building in Manassas, Virginia

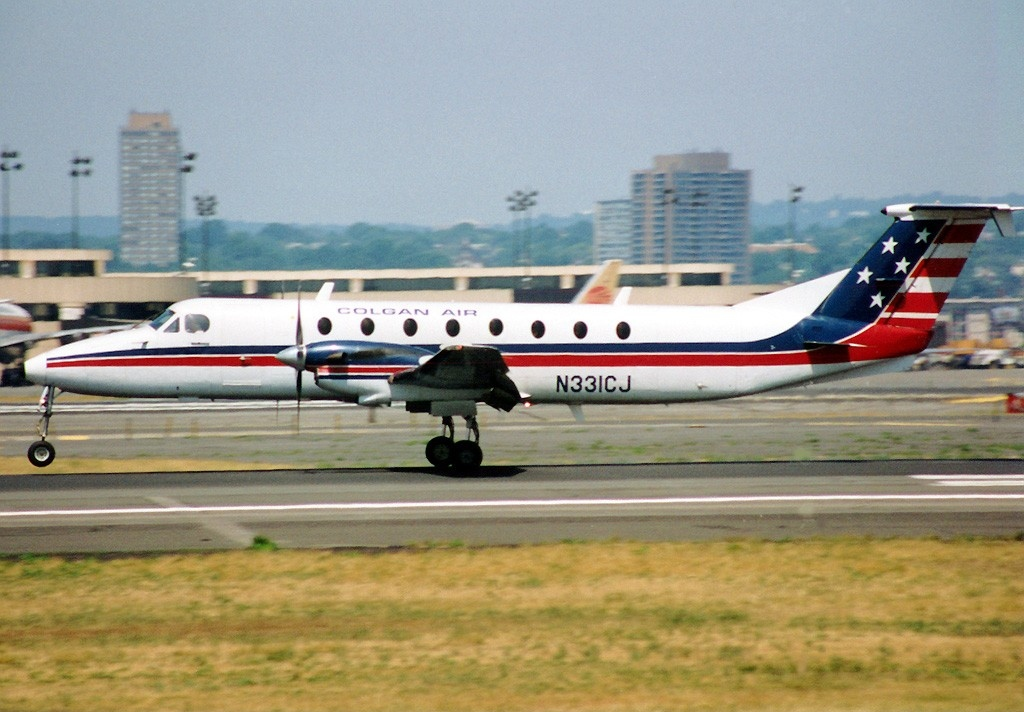
Colgan Air Beechcraft 1900C

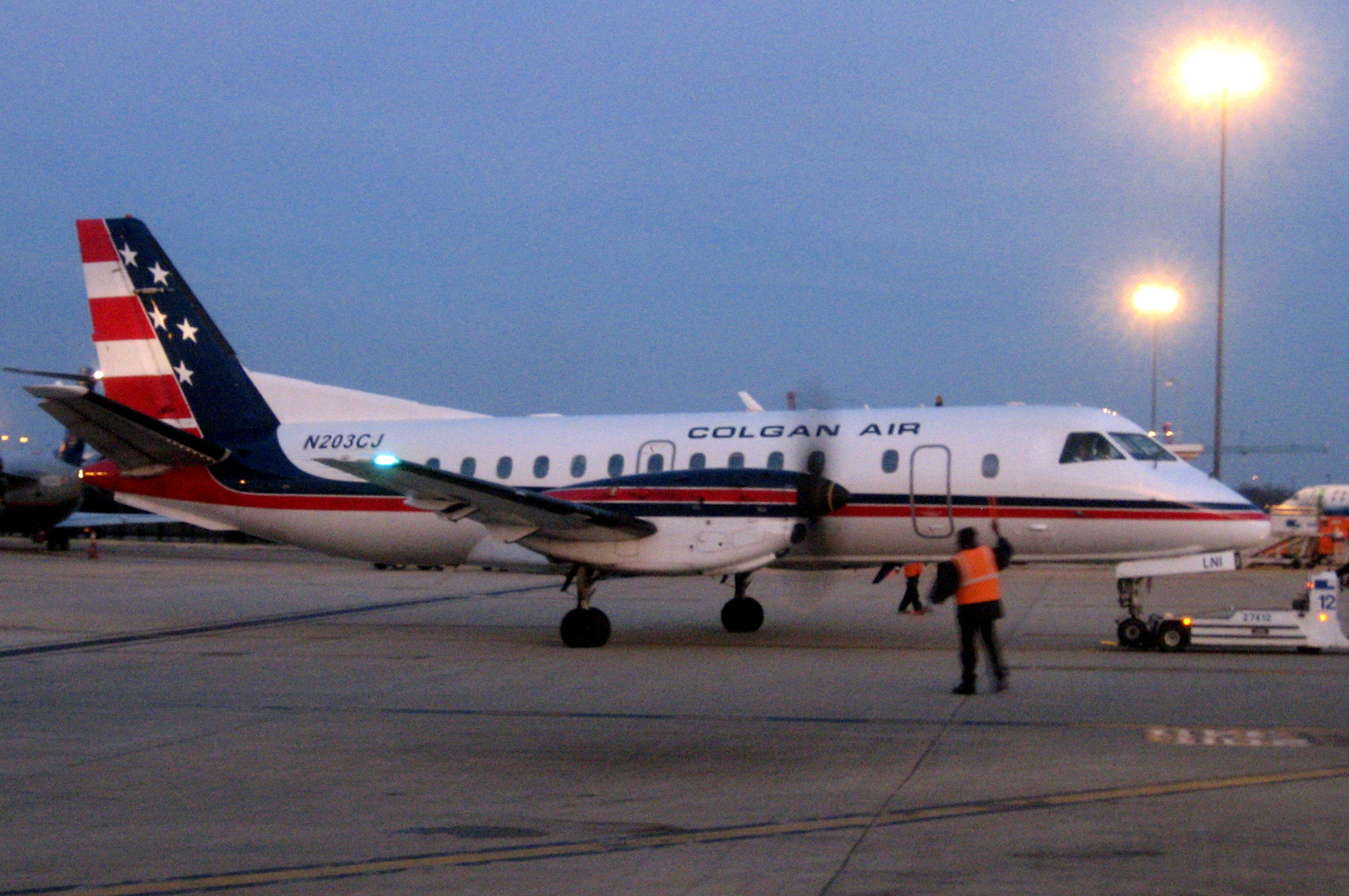
Saab 340 in Colgan Air's livery at Washington-Dulles International Airport in Northern Virginia

Charles J. Colgan founded fixed-base operator Colgan Airways Corporation at Manassas Airport in Manassas, Virginia in 1965. It began scheduled service under contract with IBM in 1970 between Manassas and Dutchess County Airport near Poughkeepsie, New York. In 1986 Colgan Air received its first airline contract with New York Air operating as New York Air Connection with Beechcraft Model 99s, Beechcraft 1900Cs, and Short 330s.

New York Air was merged into Continental Airlines on February 1, 1987, at which time Colgan became a Continental Express feeder carrier. Jetstream 31 aircraft were then acquired. In 1986 and 1987 Colgan also code-shared with Pan Am as a Pan Am Partner on the Washington-Dulles to Norfolk, Virginia route. Colgan later sold out to Presidential Airways which was also a Continental Express operator. In mid 1988 Colgan and Presidential switched from a Continental Express feeder to become a United Express feeder carrier. This operation under the United Airlines banner also only lasted about one year before Presidential shut down in 1989.

After Presidential went defunct, Colgan and his son, Michael J. Colgan, restarted service under the name National Capital on a Washington Dulles International Airport to Binghamton, New York, route on December 1, 1991. Service was provided with Beechcraft 1900C equipment. This route was later dropped and the name Colgan Air adopted. On July 1, 1997 Colgan became a feeder for Continental Airlines once again, this time operating under the name Continental Connection.

On December 11, 1999, Colgan left the Continental system and became exclusively a US Airways Express carrier, focusing its routes around major US Airways stations such as LaGuardia Airport in New York City, Pittsburgh International Airport, and Logan International Airport in Boston. However, in 2005 Colgan acquired additional Saab 340 aircraft and resumed service as Continental Connection out of George Bush Intercontinental Airport in Houston (IAH).

Early on the morning of September 11, 2001, the day of the September 11 attacks, al-Qaeda hijackers Mohammed Atta and Abdulaziz al-Omari flew on Colgan Air Flight 5930 from Portland International Jetport in Portland, Maine to Logan Airport in Boston, where they boarded American Airlines Flight 11.

On October 4, 2005, Colgan Air started providing flights for United Express flights out of Washington's Dulles Airport. Initially serving Charleston, West Virginia, and Westchester County Airport in White Plains, New York, Colgan expanded its United Express service to include State College, Pennsylvania; Charlottesville, Virginia; Allentown, Pennsylvania; and Binghamton, New York.

Colgan Air was acquired by Pinnacle Airlines Corporation on January 18, 2007, for US$20 million. Under the terms of the purchase, Colgan's regional aircraft fleet continued to operate independently of Pinnacle Airlines Corporation's major subsidiary, Pinnacle Airlines, whose all regional jet fleet continued to fly and operate in the livery of Northwest Airlink. It was a strategic move by Pinnacle to get access to Colgan’s partners, Continental Airlines, United Airlines and US Airways.

Colgan Air began providing service out of Newark Liberty International Airport in Newark, New Jersey, as Continental Connection, starting in early 2008.

Colgan's headquarters moved from Manassas to Pinnacle's headquarters in Memphis, Tennessee, in December 2009.

In July 2010, Pinnacle Airlines Corporation announced that the Colgan Air name would be phased out and all Pinnacle Airlines Corporation propeller flights would be operated by Mesaba Airlines. Colgan operated for two more years before winding down operations in 2012.

On May 15, 2012, Colgan Air ceased flying for US Airways Express. On June 5, 2012, flying in and out of IAH for United Express ceased. Colgan had previously operated as Continental Connection from IAH with Saab 340 aircraft prior to the Continental-United merger. On July 31, Colgan Air phased out operations with their Saab 340 fleet.

The last revenue flight, Colgan Air doing business as United Express Flight 3923 from Washington-Dulles to Albany, NY, was on September 5, 2012.

The remaining Bombardier Q400s on order were delivered to Republic Airways. Republic then phased out the Q400s between September 2014 and September 2016.

On January 3, 2017, the airline’s founder, Charles J. Colgan, died at the age of 90.

== Destinations ==
=== As United Express ===
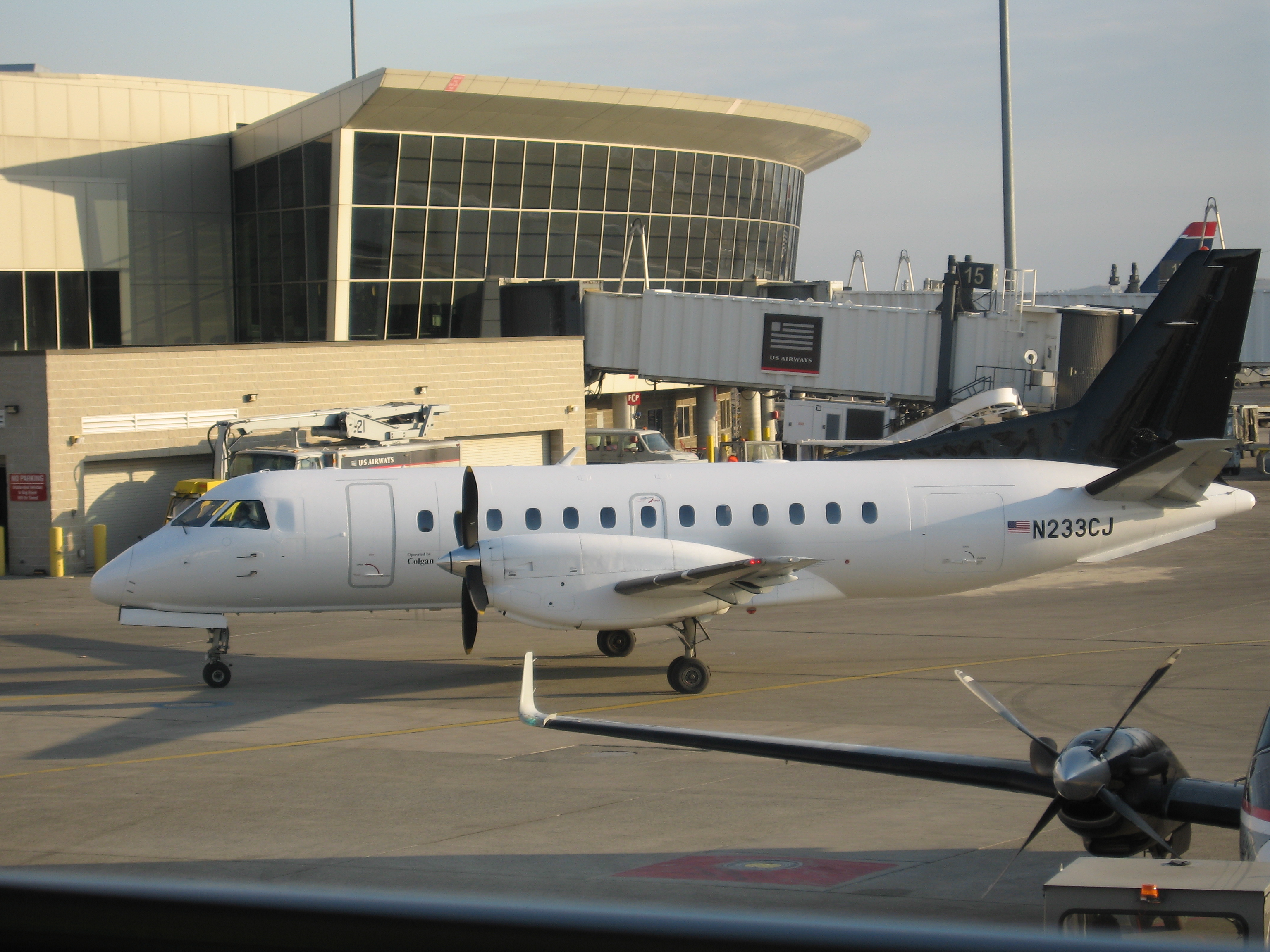
Saab 340 in an unmarked livery operated by Colgan Air at Logan International Airport in Boston.

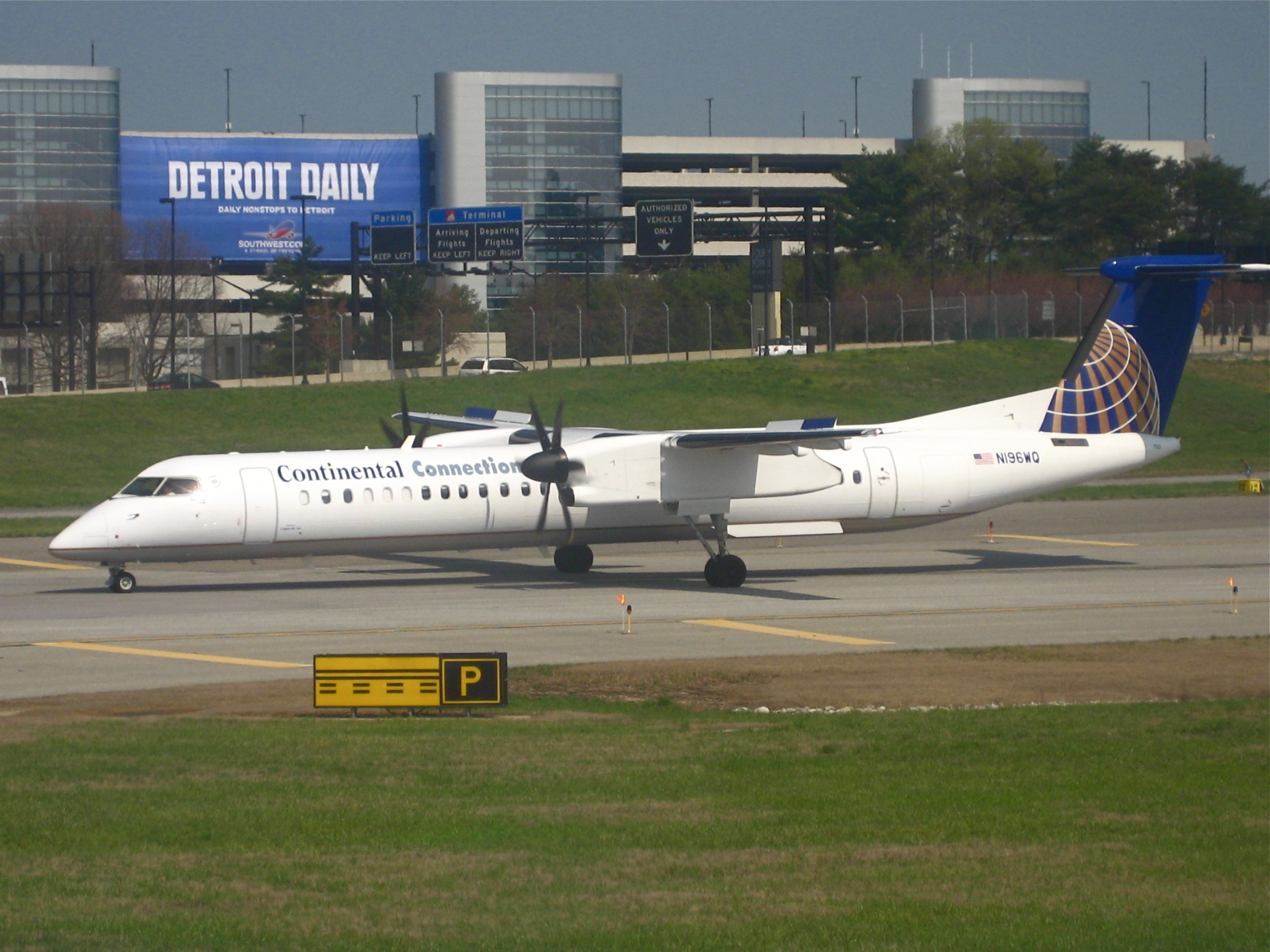
Bombardier Q400 in Continental Connection livery at Baltimore/Washington International Airport in Maryland.

Domestic

- Maine
  - Portland (Portland International Jetport)
- Maryland
  - Baltimore (Baltimore-Washington International Thurgood Marshall Airport)
- Massachusetts
  - Boston (Boston Logan International Airport)
- New Jersey
  - Newark (Newark Liberty International Airport) Hub
- New York
  - Albany (Albany International Airport)
  - Buffalo (Buffalo Niagara International Airport)
  - Rochester (Greater Rochester International Airport)
  - Syracuse (Syracuse Hancock International Airport)
- North Carolina
  - Raleigh-Durham (Raleigh-Durham International Airport)
- Ohio
  - Cleveland (Cleveland Hopkins International Airport)
  - Columbus (Port Columbus International Airport)
- Pennsylvania
  - Pittsburgh (Pittsburgh International Airport)
- Rhode Island
  - Providence (T. F. Green Airport)
- South Carolina
  - Myrtle Beach (Myrtle Beach International Airport)
- Vermont
  - Burlington (Burlington International Airport)
- New Hampshire
  - Lebanon (Lebanon Municipal Airport)
- Virginia
  - Norfolk – Norfolk International Airport
  - Richmond (Richmond International Airport)
  - Washington, D.C. (Ronald Reagan Washington National Airport) (Washington Dulles International Airport) Hub

Canada

- Nova Scotia
  - Halifax (Halifax Stanfield International Airport)
- Ontario
  - Toronto (Toronto Pearson International Airport)
- Quebec
  - Montreal (Montreal-Trudeau International Airport)

== Fleet ==
Colgan Air fleet
| Aircraft | Total | Passengers | | | | Notes |
| Aircraft | Total | F | Y+ | E | Total | Notes |
|---|---|---|---|---|---|---|
| Bombardier Q400 | 14 | 7 | 10 | 54 | 71 | All operated as Continental Connection from 2008 until 2012, then as United Express. All transferred to Republic Airways at the time of airline's dissolution One crashed as Colgan Air Flight 3407. |
| Bombardier Q400 | 14 | 0 | 0 | 74 | 74 | All operated as Continental Connection from 2008 until 2012, then as United Express. All transferred to Republic Airways at the time of airline's dissolution One crashed as Colgan Air Flight 3407. |
| Saab 340 | 5 | 0 | 0 | 35 | 35 | All aircraft retired during airline's dissolution |
| Total | 19 | | | | | |

All aircraft were operated under Colgan Air's operating certificate.

Q400 aircraft were scheduled for interior configuration changes to install first class. Saab 340 aircraft are also operated.

== Headquarters ==
The headquarters of Colgan Air were, at the end of the airline's life, located in Memphis. The headquarters were formerly on the grounds of the Manassas Regional Airport. On Tuesday June 28, 2005, the Prince William County, Virginia, Board of County Supervisors voted to sell 10 acres (4.0 ha) of land in the Innovation@Prince William business park in Prince William County to Colgan. Colgan Air planned to build a 40,000 square feet (3,700 m^{2}) corporate headquarters and training facility in the business park for $1.7 million (including equipment costs) and move its headquarters from its airport site. Colgan planned to move its administrative and training employees from the headquarters site and other sites in Manassas and Prince William County to the new complex. The company also planned to hire around 90 additional employees as part of the process.

After Pinnacle Airlines Corp. bought Colgan Air in 2007 and made Colgan Air its subsidiary, Pinnacle agreed to keep Colgan's headquarters in Manassas as long as, in the company's words, "it continues to make operational and financial sense for the organization." In 2009, Colgan Air announced that it was moving its headquarters to Memphis to be in proximity to the offices of Pinnacle Airlines, Colgan Air's parent company. Fifty employees were scheduled to transfer to Memphis to work in crew scheduling, dispatch, training, flight operations, and other administrative tasks. While 45 other employees were asked to move to Memphis, they declined so they could stay in the Manassas area. In September 2009, the human resources department was scheduled to stay in Manassas.

In October 2009, Pinnacle tried to get additional incentives from the State of Tennessee as the Colgan headquarters were about to move. During that month, Colgan announced that 20 employees would remain in Manassas to man the two hangars at Manassas Regional Airport. One hundred jobs in Manassas were lost as part of the headquarters move. Helaine Becker, a transportation analyst employed by Jesup & Lamont Securities Corp, believed that the moving of Colgan would help reduce costs; she said that the company did not need two corporate headquarters and that "I think it has more to do with that than anything else."

In 2010, Pinnacle Airlines Corp. considered moving its headquarters to Downtown Memphis and to Olive Branch, Mississippi, and the airline also considered keeping the headquarters in its current location. Pinnacle selected Downtown Memphis, and on October 8, 2010, the airline held a celebration for its decision to move into One Commerce Square in Downtown Memphis. The Center City Commission, the City of Memphis, and Shelby County gave out $10 million in incentives, including free parking, to convince Pinnacle to move to Downtown Memphis.

== Accidents and incidents ==
- August 26, 2003: Flight 9446, a Beechcraft 1900D (registered N240CJ) operated for US Airways Express as a non-revenue "ferry flight" hit the water off the coast of Yarmouth, Massachusetts, shortly after taking off from Barnstable Municipal Airport in Hyannis, Massachusetts. Both pilots died in the crash.
- February 12, 2009: Flight 3407, a Bombardier Q400 (registered N200WQ) operated for Continental Connection crashed into a house located at 6038 Long Street in Clarence Center, New York, while on approach to Buffalo Niagara International Airport, resulting in 50 deaths. The NTSB report states that pilot error, in particular a non-standard response to stick-shaker system, was the cause of the crash. Secondary causes included pilot fatigue.
- September 7, 2011: Flight 3222, a Saab 340B (registered N352CJ) operated for Continental Connection with 23 passengers en route from Houston, Texas, to Lake Charles Regional Airport in Lake Charles, Louisiana, landed at nearby Southland Field in Carlyss, which was a similarly oriented airport located southwest of the intended destination.

== See also ==
- List of defunct airlines of the United States
