= Continental Connection =

Regional airline of the United States (1986–2012)

IATA	ICAO	Call sign
9K; 9L; C5; 3M	KAP; CJC; UCA; SIL	CAIR; COLGAN; COMMUTAIR; SILVER WINGS
- Founded: 1986
- Ceased operations: March 3, 2012 (merged into United Express)
- Hubs: Cleveland; Denver–Stapleton (1986–1995); Houston–Intercontinental; Newark
- Frequent-flyer program: OnePass
- Alliance: SkyTeam (affiliate; 2004–2009); Star Alliance (affiliate; 2009–2012)
- Parent company: Continental Airlines (1986–2010); United Airlines (2010–2012)
- Headquarters: Houston, Texas, U.S.

Continental Connection was the brand name under which several commuter airline carriers and their holding companies operated services marketed exclusively by Continental Airlines. As such, all Continental Connection banner carrier services were operated primarily with turboprop aircraft in contrast to Continental Express, whose flights were operated by Continental's regional jet partners, ExpressJet and Chautauqua Airlines. Continental Connection operations were merged into Continental Express in 2012.

According to the Official Airline Guide, earlier Continental Express flights, such as those operated by Royale Airlines followed by Britt Airways from the Continental hub at Houston Intercontinental Airport (IAH), were operated with such turboprop aircraft as the ATR 42, Embraer EMB 110, Embraer EMB 120, and Grumman Gulfstream I during the 1980s.

All flights operated by Continental Connection carriers were given full OnePass frequent-flyer credit, as if they were mainline Continental flights.

The "Continental Connection" name was discontinued and the operation adopted United Airlines' existing United Express branding following the merger of Continental Airlines with United in 2010.

== Operators and fleet ==
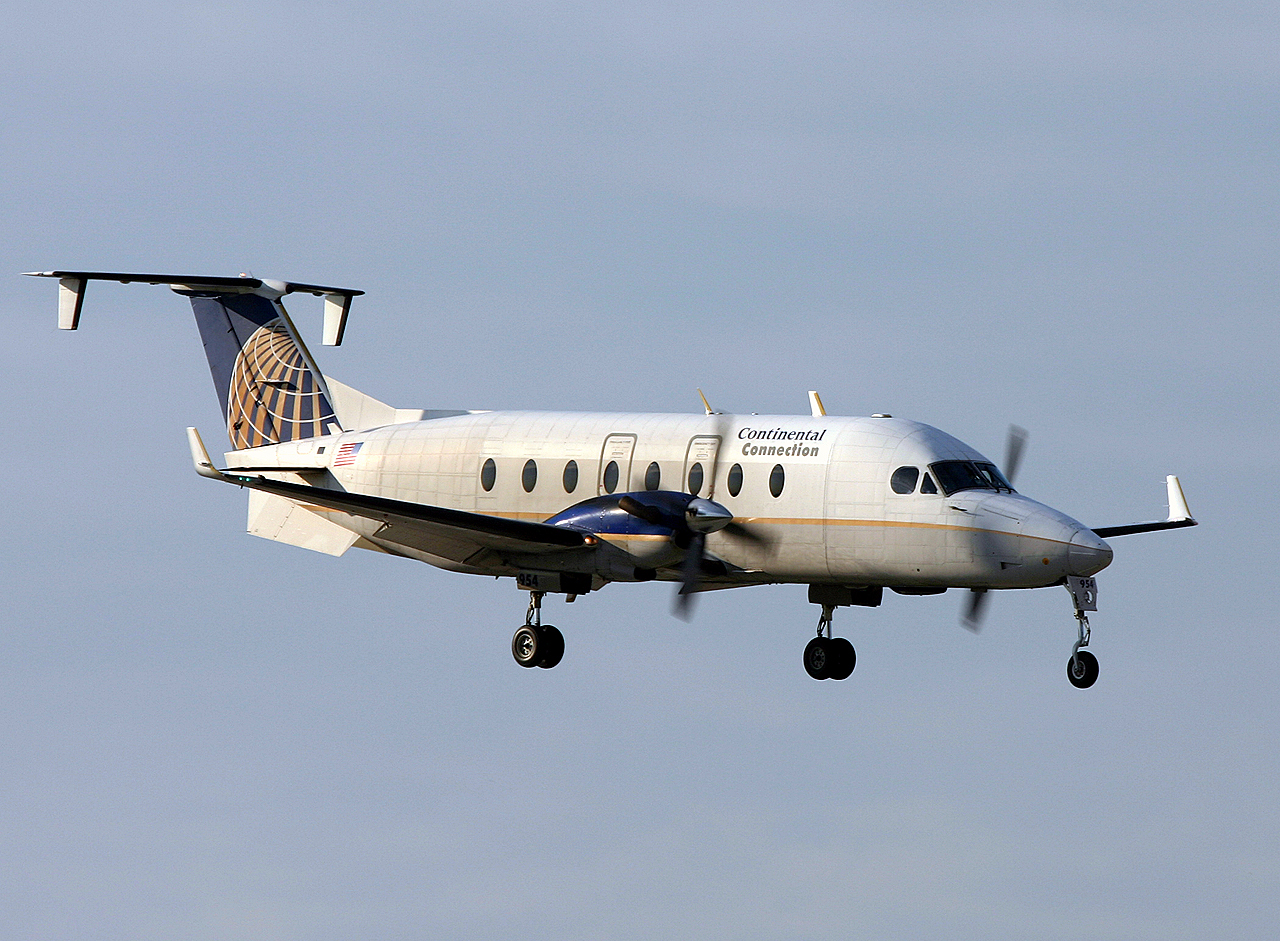
Beechcraft 1900D

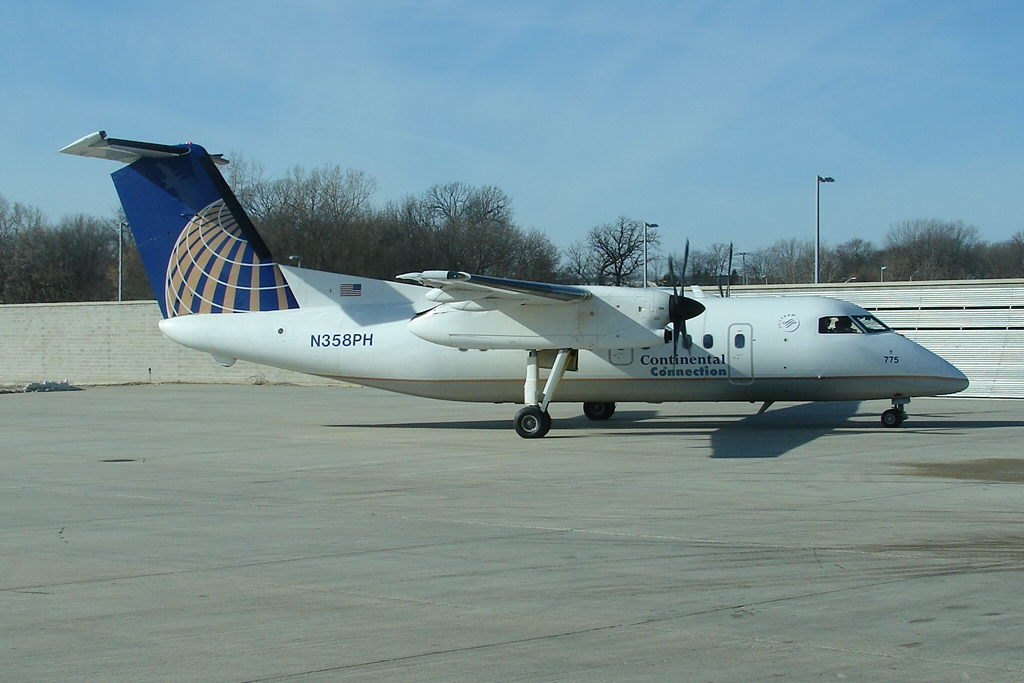
Bombardier Q200

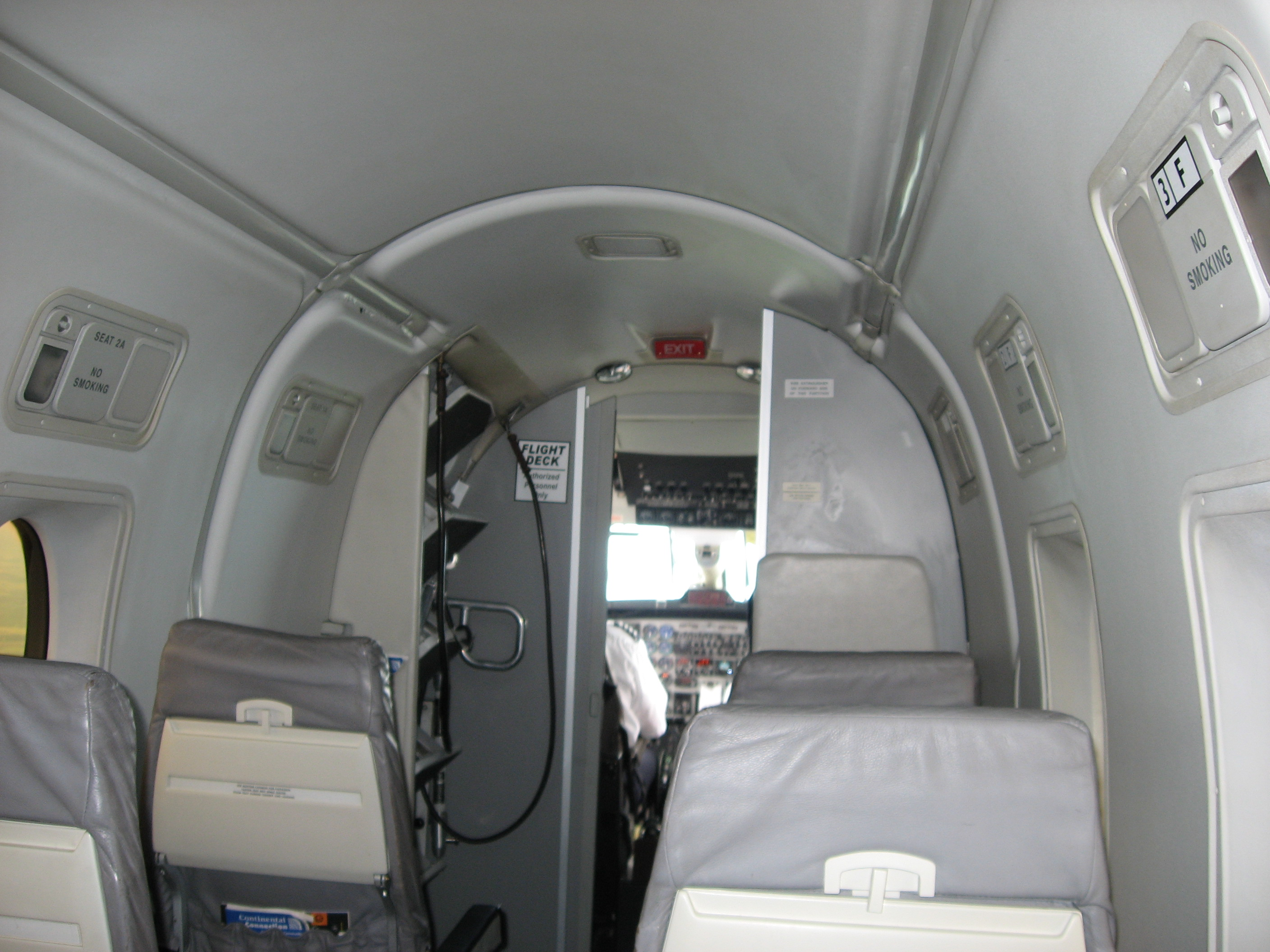
Beechcraft 1900D interior

Continental Connection fleet at dissolution
Airline	IATA Service	ICAO Code	Callsign	Aircraft	In fleet	Passengers	Parent
Cape Air	9K	KAP	Cair	ATR 42	2	46	Hyannis Air Service, Inc.
Colgan Air	9L	CJC	Colgan	Bombardier Q400	16	74	Pinnacle Airlines Corp.
Colgan Air	9L	CJC	Colgan	Saab 340	11	34	Pinnacle Airlines Corp.
CommutAir	C5	UCA	CommutAir	Bombardier Q200	16	37	Champlain Enterprises, Inc.
Silver Airways	3M	SIL	Silver Wings	Beechcraft 1900D	21	19	Victory Park Capital
				Total	66		

== Incidents and accidents ==
- On February 12, 2009, Colgan Air Flight 3407 operating on behalf of Continental Connection crashed into a house on Long Road in Clarence Center, New York while on approach to Buffalo Niagara International Airport; 50 people, including one on the ground, were killed according to New York State Police.
- On September 7, 2011, Colgan Air Flight 3222, with 23 passengers en route from Houston, TX to Lake Charles, LA landed at Southland Field, which was not their scheduled destination. The crew was subsequently relieved of duty.

== See also ==
- List of defunct airlines of the United States
