= Endeavor Air =

Regional airline of the United States

Endeavor Air, Inc.

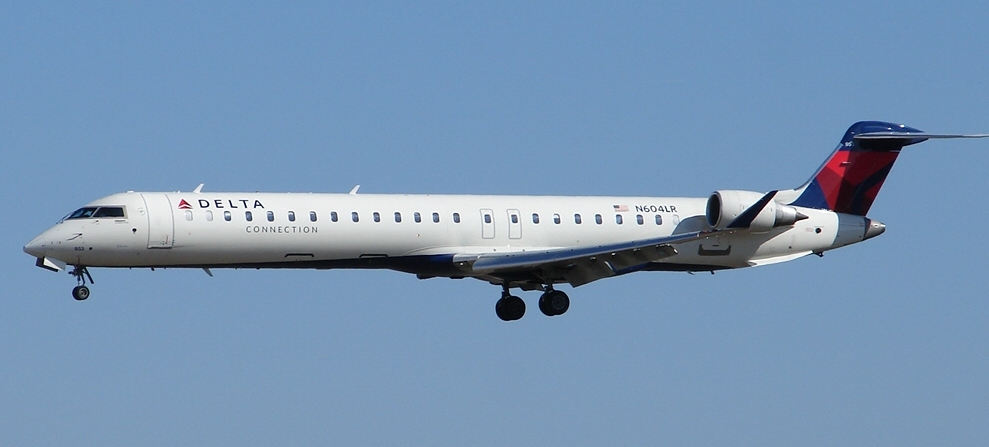
- Endeavor Air CRJ900 operated for Delta Connection
IATA	ICAO	Call sign
9E	EDV	ENDEAVOR
- Founded: February 1985; 41 years ago (as Express Airlines I)
- Commenced operations: June 1, 1985; 41 years ago (as Express Airlines I); May 8, 2002; 24 years ago (as Pinnacle Airlines); August 1, 2013; 13 years ago (as Endeavor Air)
- AOC #: REXA257A
- Operating bases: Atlanta; Cincinnati; Detroit; Minneapolis/St. Paul; New York–JFK; New York–LaGuardia; Raleigh/Durham
- Frequent-flyer program: SkyMiles
- Alliance: SkyTeam (affiliate)
- Fleet size: 145
- Destinations: 145
- Parent company: Delta Air Lines
- Headquarters: Fort Snelling (unorganized territory), Minnesota, U.S.
- Key people: Timothy Wang (president & CEO)
- Employees: 5,000
- Website: endeavorair.com

Endeavor Air is a regional airline in the United States headquartered at the Minneapolis–Saint Paul International Airport in Fort Snelling (unorganized territory), Hennepin County, Minnesota. It is a wholly owned subsidiary of Delta Air Lines, and staffs, operates, and maintains aircraft used on Delta Connection flights that are scheduled, marketed, and sold by Delta Air Lines.

The airline was founded as Express Airlines I in 1985 and was renamed Pinnacle Airlines in 2002. In 2012, Pinnacle's parent company filed for Chapter 11 reorganization, then emerged as a wholly owned subsidiary of Delta Air Lines. The airline was renamed Endeavor Air on August 1, 2013.

Its corporate headquarters are located in Delta Air Lines Building C, on the property of Minneapolis–Saint Paul International Airport. It has hubs in Atlanta, Cincinnati, Detroit, Minneapolis/St. Paul, New York's LaGuardia & JFK airports, and Raleigh/Durham. Until the restructuring, Endeavor also operated a hub in Memphis.

== History ==
=== Express Airlines I ===
In February 1985, the airline was established as Express Airlines I, offering regional airline service to major airlines. The airline's founder, Michael J. Brady, had planned to create several regional airlines under parent company Phoenix Airline Services, Inc, hence the roman numeral "I" in the name. A second company, established as Express Airlines II (known as "Express II"), was created by spinning off Express I's operations at Minneapolis–Saint Paul International Airport to a separate entity. However, Express II contracted with Express I to provide crew scheduling, operational control, and training. Express II was later recombined back into Express I.

Express I began its first code-sharing agreement, in May 1985, with Republic Airlines. Republic was the dominant carrier in Memphis but, in keeping with the hub-and-spoke concept, wanted to add more smaller cities and free up its larger DC-9 jets to serve longer stage-length routes. Express I accomplished this by adding service, operating as Republic Express, to three cities using BAe Jetstream 31 aircraft. Within six months, Express Airlines I was operating in ten markets using nine Jetstream 31s and two Saab 340 aircraft.

By its first anniversary, Republic Express, as the service was known, was operating 20 Jetstream 31s and seven Saab 340s in 32 markets. Following regulatory and shareholder approvals, Northwest Airlines acquired Republic Airlines on October 1, 1986. Subsequently, the Republic Express brand merged with the Northwest Airlink brand.

Over the next decade, Express I provided airline services as Northwest Airlink to 56 cities in the Southeast and upper Mid-West. In 1997, Northwest Airlines bought Express I from Phoenix Airline Services. On April 1, 1997, Express I became a wholly owned subsidiary of Northwest Airlines. In order to consolidate the many Airlink systems operated at that time, Express I ceased flying from Minneapolis-St. Paul, and instead concentrated on the Memphis hub.

In August 1997, Express I moved its corporate headquarters to Memphis, allowing all the various departments to function from its main base of operations. On May 7, 2000, Express I became the launch operator of the Bombardier CRJ for Northwest code sharing service.

Express I further expanded with the development of three additional Maintenance, Repair, Overhaul (MRO) facilities related to CRJ operations. The primary CRJ MRO is located in Knoxville, Tennessee, and is capable of handling up to four aircraft undercover. There were two additional CRJ maintenance sites located in Indiana at South Bend and Fort Wayne, but both were closed after the bankruptcy.

=== Pinnacle Airlines ===
On May 8, 2002, Express Airlines changed its name to Pinnacle Airlines. A new holding company, Pinnacle Airlines Corporation, had been created earlier that year. Pinnacle Airlines, Inc was moved from Northwest Airlines, Inc to Pinnacle Airlines Corporation. Over the next decade, the parent company acquired other airlines, such as Colgan Air and Mesaba Airlines.

In 2006, Northwest agreed to a new Air Service Agreement (ASA) that contracted Pinnacle to fly 124 CRJs until 2017. A clause within the ASA stipulated that if Pinnacle and the Air Line Pilots Association did not agree on a new pilot contract by March 31, 2007, then Northwest could remove up to 17 CRJs from Pinnacle's fleet. After the deadline passed with no new pilot contract, Northwest exercised its right to remove 17 CRJs from Pinnacle, starting in September 2008 at a rate of two CRJs per month. These 17 CRJs were handed over to Mesaba Airlines in 2008, which Pinnacle's parent company later acquired in 2010.

Northwest had also allowed Pinnacle to seek flying for other carriers. On April 30, 2007, Pinnacle Airlines Corp. signed a 10-year contract with Delta Air Lines to be a Delta Connection carrier. The 16 CRJ900s began delivery in November 2007 and the deliveries were completed in May 2009. The first batch of delivered aircraft was based in Atlanta and began service in December 2007. On June 10, 2008, Pinnacle announced that Delta planned to withdraw from the contract by July 31, 2008, for failure to make its timetable. However, on July 18, 2008, Delta announced that an agreement had been reached that would allow Pinnacle to continue flying for Delta under the terms of the initial contract. The remaining 4 CRJ900s would be delivered between January and May 2009, at which point all 15 CRJ900s would be in service for Delta Connection.

The FAA fined Pinnacle over $1 million for allegedly operating two Canadair Regional Jets in 2009 and 2010 that were not in compliance with FAA regulations. On one of the aircraft, the flight crew performed procedures that should have been conducted by maintenance personnel. FAA inspectors had denied a request to make the work an operations task. On a second aircraft, Pinnacle was accused of failing to conduct proper monitoring of a cracked low-pressure turbine case.

On January 4, 2012, Pinnacle's fleet grew when its parent company moved aircraft and personnel from Mesaba Airlines, which ceased operations when the operating certificate was returned to the FAA. It also acquired personnel from Colgan Air after it ceased operations on September 5, 2012.

=== Endeavor Air ===
On April 1, 2012, Pinnacle's parent company and its subsidiaries filed for bankruptcy protection under Chapter 11 of the United States Bankruptcy Code. The airline discontinued its operation of its Saab 340 and Bombardier Q400 turboprop aircraft by the end of November 2012. On May 1, 2013, Pinnacle Airlines Corporation emerged from Chapter 11 reorganization as a wholly owned subsidiary of Delta Air Lines. After restructuring, the airline was renamed Endeavor Air, its headquarters were moved to Minneapolis, Minnesota, and agreements with Delta were made to operate 76-seat and 50-seat regional jets.

On October 27, 2016, Endeavor Air adopted EDV as its new ICAO airline code and "Endeavor" as its callsign, replacing its previous code of FLG and "Flagship" callsign.

In March 2017, Endeavor announced it would be re-opening an Atlanta crew and maintenance base, operating CRJ200 aircraft at this hub. By July 2017, Endeavor had five crew and ten maintenance bases. CRJ900 operations were added to Atlanta later in the year, with the transfer of aircraft from ExpressJet. The CRJ700 was introduced in 2018.

Endeavor grew further in 2019 with the addition of aircraft from GoJet Airlines and new deliveries of 70-seat CRJ-900 aircraft.

== Destinations and bases ==
Endeavor Air operates crew and maintenance bases at:

=== Crew bases ===
- Atlanta
- Cincinnati
- Detroit
- Minneapolis/St. Paul
- New York–JFK
- New York–LaGuardia
- Raleigh/Durham

=== Maintenance bases ===
- Atlanta
- Cincinnati
- Detroit
- Des Moines, Iowa
- Indianapolis
- Knoxville
- Minneapolis/St. Paul
- Mosinee, Wisconsin
- New York–JFK
- New York–LaGuardia
- Raleigh/Durham

== Fleet ==
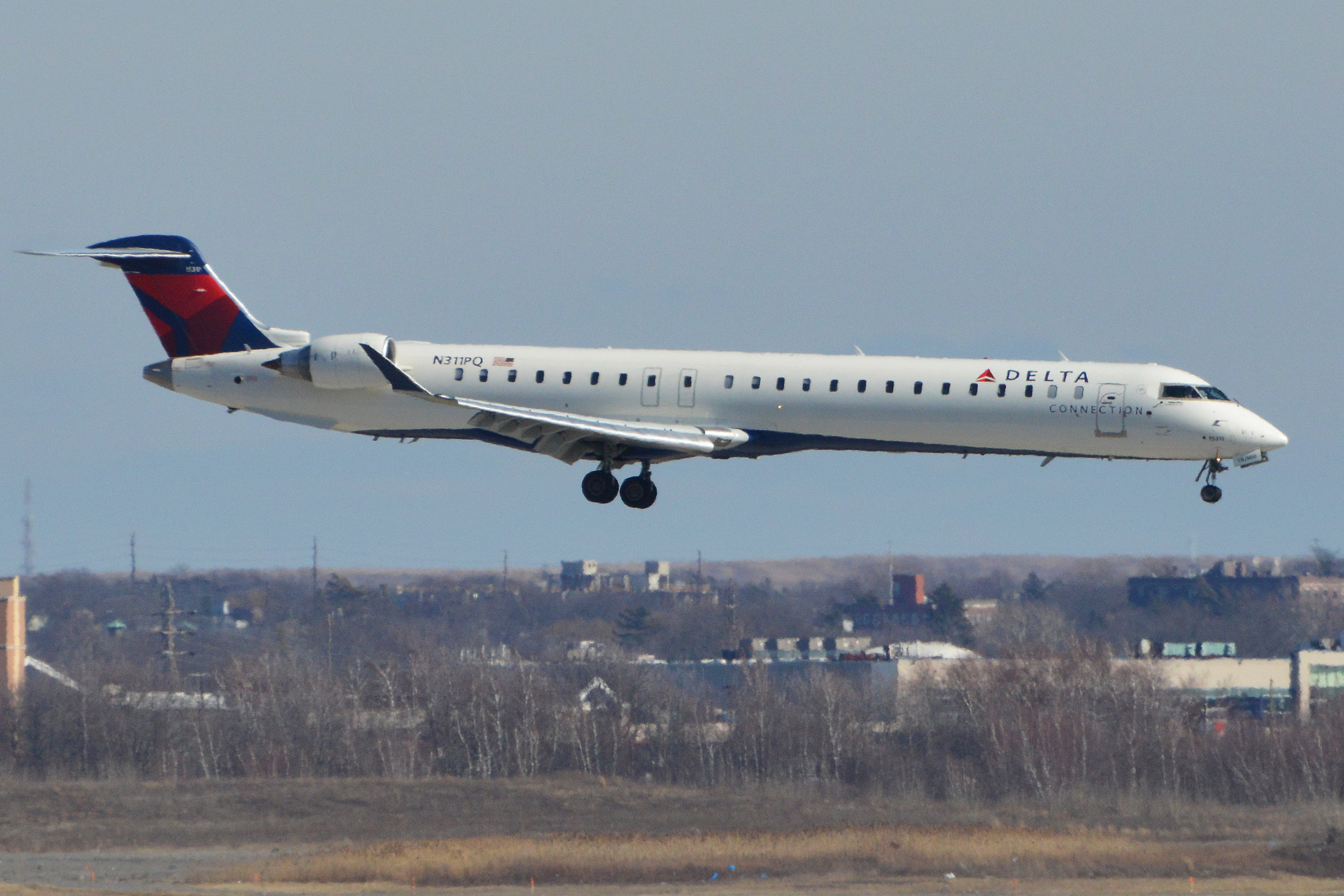
Endeavor Air CRJ900 arriving to John F. Kennedy International Airport

As of June 2026, Endeavor Air operates the following aircraft:

Aircraft	In service	Passengers				Notes
Aircraft	In service	F	Y+	Y	Total	Notes
Bombardier CRJ700	15	9	16	44	69	4 transferring to Skywest
Bombardier CRJ900	20	12	20	38	70	Conversion for scope compliance.
Bombardier CRJ900	110	12	20	44	76	Adding 4 CRJ900 From Skywest
Total	145					

== Accidents and incidents ==
- Northwest Airlink Flight 5719 (December 1, 1993): A Jetstream 31 (registration N334PX), operated by Express Airlines II, collided with trees and crashed while on approach to Chisholm-Hibbing Airport in Hibbing, Minnesota. All sixteen passengers and both pilots perished. The investigation determined that the captain exhibited a history of hostile and intimidating behavior toward first officers, which contributed to a breakdown in cockpit communication. This loss of coordination led to the crew's failure to monitor altitude during a nighttime landing in poor weather conditions.
- Pinnacle Airlines Flight 3701 (October 14, 2004): A Bombardier CRJ200LR (registration N8396A), operated by Pinnacle Airlines, crashed in a residential area of Jefferson City, Missouri, during an repositioning flight from Little Rock, Arkansas, to Minneapolis. The aircraft lost power in both engines after the crew attempted to exceed its operational limits by reaching its maximum certified altitude. The crew could not restart the engines and was unsuccessful in gliding the aircraft to a safe landing. Both pilots were fatally injured, they were the only people aboard the aircraft.
- Pinnacle Airlines Ground Incident (January 24, 2012): A Bombardier CRJ200ER (registration N8524A), operated by Pinnacle Airlines, sustained irreparable damage at Rhode Island T. F. Green International Airport in Providence. The aircraft was connected to ground support equipment that caught fire, causing substantial damage to the aircraft's electrical systems, leading it to be written off.
- Delta Connection Flight 3413 (May 1, 2018): A Bombardier CRJ900LR (registration N606LR), operated by Endeavor Air as Delta Connection Flight 3413, sustained substantial damage at John F. Kennedy International Airport in New York City. The incident occurred when the wing of a Boeing 767-300ER operated by Delta Air Lines collided with the CRJ900's tail while taxiing.
- Delta Connection Flight 4994 (January 2, 2023): A Bombardier CRJ900LR (registration N928XJ), operated by Endeavor Air as Delta Connection Flight 4994, sustained substantial damage at John F. Kennedy International Airport in New York City. The incident occurred when the wing of an Airbus A330 operated by ITA Airways collided with the CRJ900's tail while taxiing.
- Delta Connection Flight 5526 (September 10, 2024): A Bombardier CRJ900LR (registration N302PQ), operated by Endeavor Air as Delta Connection Flight 5526, sustained substantial damage at Hartsfield–Jackson Atlanta International Airport. The incident occurred when the wing of an Airbus A350 operated by Delta Air Lines collided with and severed the CRJ900's tail while taxiing.
- Delta Connection Flight 4819 (February 17, 2025): A Bombardier CRJ900LR (registration N932XJ), operated by Endeavor Air as Delta Connection Flight 4819, crashed and overturned upon landing at Toronto Pearson International Airport following a flight from Minneapolis–Saint Paul International Airport. The accident resulted in injuries to at least 21 individuals.
- Endeavor Air Flights 5047 & 5155 (October 1, 2025): The nose of Flight 5047 (arriving from Charlotte, North Carolina) collided with the wing of Flight 5155 (departing for Roanoke, Virginia) while both aircraft were taxiing on the tarmac of LaGuardia Airport. One flight attendant was injured.

== Employee relations ==
On February 14, 2024, Endeavor flight attendants picketed at Hartsfield-Jackson International Airport and Delta's headquarters to bring attention to what they refer to as the "Delta Disparity Difference," the 45% pay difference between Delta mainline flight attendant pay and those at the regional carrier. Endeavor flight attendants alleged that many of them struggle to make ends meet while Delta paid $1.4 billion profit-sharing bonuses to their mainline employees. In May 2024, over 1,000 Endeavor Air flight attendants sent a letter to Delta CEO Ed Bastian asking for higher pay. In the letter, Endeavor flight attendants allege that many of them are on public assistance and do not feel like a valuable part of Delta.

== See also ==
- Air transportation in the United States
