= UXL =

UXL may refer to:

- UXL (airport), a code sign for Southland Field airport
- UXL (consortium), Unified Acceleration Foundation, a technology consortium related to the OneAPI initiative
