= Northwest Airlink =

Regional airline of the United States (1984–2009)

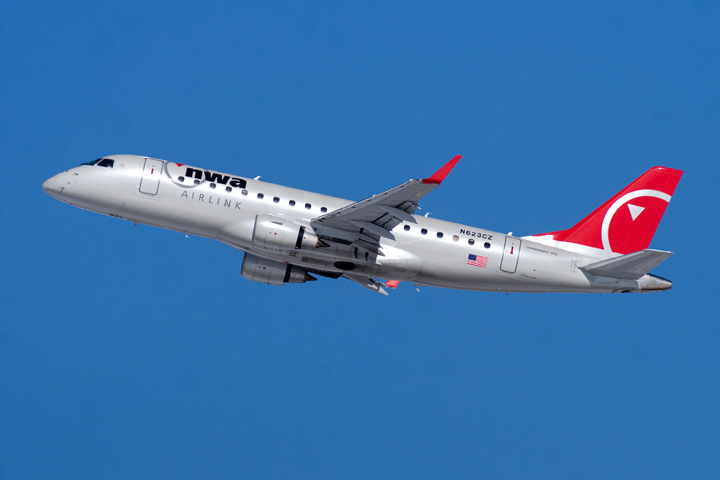
- Northwest Airlink Embraer E175 in 2009
IATA	ICAO	Call sign
CP; XJ; 9E	CPZ; MES; FLG	COMPASS; MESABA; FLAGSHIP
- Founded: December 1, 1984 (as Northwest Orient Airlink)
- Commenced operations: October 1, 1986 (as Northwest Airlink)
- Ceased operations: October 1, 1986 (as Northwest Orient Airlink); January 31, 2010 (merged into Delta Connection)
- Hubs: Detroit; Memphis; Minneapolis/St. Paul
- Frequent-flyer program: WorldPerks
- Alliance: SkyTeam (affiliate; 2004–2010)
- Parent company: Northwest Airlines (1984–2009); Delta Air Lines (2009–2010)
- Headquarters: Eagan, Minnesota, United States

Northwest Jet Airlink
IATA	ICAO	Call sign
XJ; HQ	MES; GAA	MESABA; BIZEX
- Commenced operations: April 1997
- Ceased operations: April 3, 2003
- Frequent-flyer program: WorldPerks
- Alliance: Wings Alliance (affiliate)
- Parent company: Northwest Airlines (1997–2003)
- Headquarters: Eagan, Minnesota, United States

Northwest Airlink was the brand name of Northwest Airlines' regional airline service, which flew turboprop and regional jet aircraft from Northwest's domestic hubs in Minneapolis, Detroit, and Memphis. Service was primarily to small-to-medium-sized cities and towns where larger aircraft might not be economical to operate and also to larger markets to either provide additional capacity or more frequent flights than could be justified using mainline aircraft. The Northwest Airlink trade name was replaced by the Delta Connection trade name for Delta Air Lines following the Delta/Northwest merger.

== History ==
Northwest Airlink was formed in December 1984 when Northwest Airlines took steps to enhance its domestic services by entering a marketing agreement with Mesaba Airlines. Mesaba was the dominant airline serving Minneapolis/St Paul at the time. Under the agreement, Mesaba would operate as Northwest Orient Airlink. Mesaba initially operated commuter and regional turboprop aircraft. The Mesaba fleet at this time comprised fourteen Beechcraft 99 and one Fokker F27 aircraft. In 1985 Big Sky Airlines entered the Northwest Airlink agreement with 8-18 passenger seat aircraft including Jetstream 31 and Fairchild Metroliner commuter propjets. Another Northwest Airlink operator was Fischer Brothers Aviation flying CASA C-212, Dornier 228 and Short 360 commuter turboprops.

An Official Airline Guide (OAG) flight schedule dated February 1994 lists the following commuter and regional air carriers operating Northwest Airlink service:

- Express Airlines I
- Express Airlines II
- Mesaba Airlines
- Northeast Express Regional Airlines
- Precision Airlines

In 2001, Pacific Island Aviation was operating Northwest Airlink service with Short 360 commuter turboprop aircraft between Guam, Saipan and Tinian.

The company's parent, Northwest Airlines, filed for Chapter 11 bankruptcy protection for the first time in its 79-year history on September 14, 2005, a day before a scheduled $65 million pension payment, and during a strike by its mechanics' union. With Northwest's filing, four of the six largest U.S. carriers were operating under bankruptcy protection: Northwest joined Delta Air Lines (which filed just minutes before), United Airlines, and US Airways in bankruptcy. Northwest CEO Doug Steenland said that high fuel prices forced the airline to seek court protection; the relatively high age of Northwest's fleet exacerbated the impact of fuel prices on its finances.

Northwest Jet Airlink was subsequently formed to operate services with Avro RJ85 jets flown by Mesaba Airlines. Another Northwest Jet Airlink operator was Business Express Airlines flying Avro RJ70 jets.

== Operators and fleet ==
=== Fleet ===
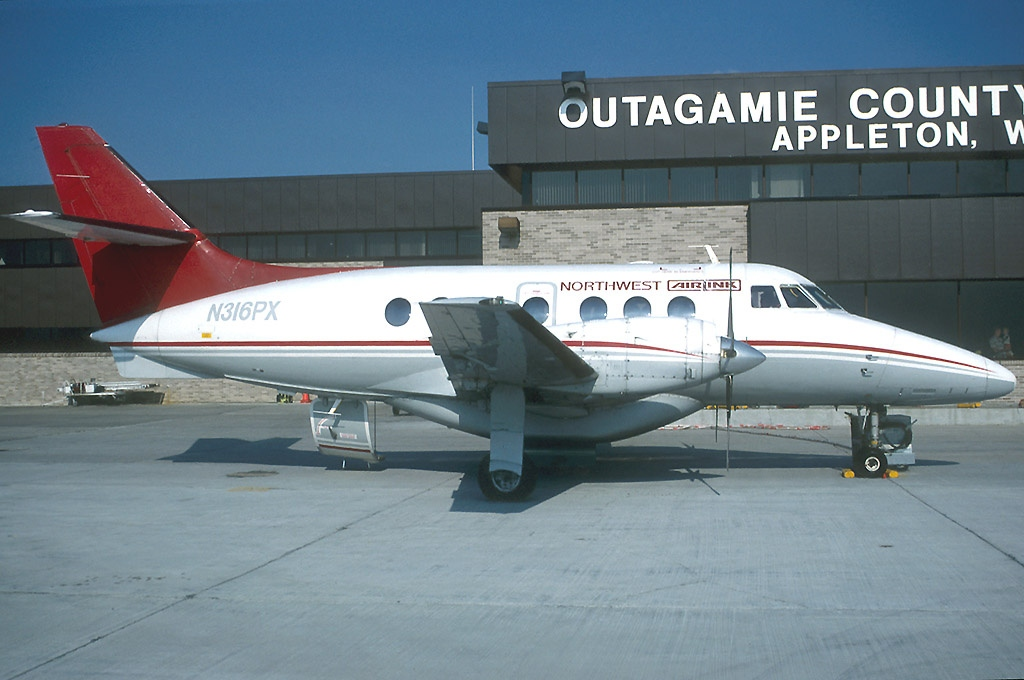
Northwest Airlink Jetstream 31 operated by Express Airlines I (1991)

The following air carriers were operating Northwest Airlink service at the time of the merger of Northwest Airlines with Delta Air Lines:

Northwest Airlink fleet
Airline	IATA Service	ICAO Code	Callsign	Aircraft	In Fleet	Image	Parent
Compass Airlines	CP	CPZ	Compass	Embraer 175	32	Northwest Airlink Embraer E175 (2008)	Northwest Airlines
Mesaba Airlines	XJ	MES	Mesaba	Bombardier CRJ200	16	Northwest Airlink CRJ-200 (2012)	Northwest Airlines
Mesaba Airlines	XJ	MES	Mesaba	Bombardier CRJ900	34	"Mesaba 3513" arriving from MSP.	Northwest Airlines
Mesaba Airlines	XJ	MES	Mesaba	Saab 340	49	Northwest Airlink Saab 340 operated by Mesaba shortly after takeoff from Minneapolis St-Paul (2007)	Northwest Airlines
Pinnacle Airlines	9E	FLG	Flagship	Bombardier CRJ200	39	Northwest Airlink CRJ-200 (2012)	Pinnacle Airlines Corp.

=== Historical regional jet fleet ===
The Northwest Airlink brand, through its various regional and commuter airline partners, operated a variety of jet aircraft over the years including the following types:

Aircraft	Image
BAe 146-100	
BAe 146-200	A beautiful RJ-85 gliding into MSP, she will be missed come october...most of Mesaba's RJ-85's will live on with Air France. 1101

=== Historical turboprop fleet ===
The Northwest Airlink brand, through its various regional and commuter airline partners, operated a variety of twin turboprop aircraft over the years including the following types:

Aircraft	Image
ATR 42	
BAe Jetstream 31	Northwest Airlink BAe Jetstream 31 operated by Express Airlines I (1991)
Beechcraft Model 99	
Bombardier Dash 8-100	
CASA C-212	CASA C-212-200 N160FB of Northwest Airlink at Flint, Michigan
Dornier 228	Northwest_AirLink_Dornier_228_N234RP_at_BOS_(21581477044)
Fairchild Metroliner	Fairchild_SA-227AC_Metro_III,_Northwest_Airlink_(Northeast_Express_Regional_Airlines)_AN0269060
Fokker F27	This rather elderly Mesaba F-27 was scrapped shortly after I took this shot through the tinted windows of the Northwest club louonge at MSP in the early 1980's.
Short 360	Northwest Airlink (operated by Pacific Island Aviation) Short 360 N711PK at Antonio B. Won Pat International Airport

== Incidents and accidents ==
- March 4, 1987: Northwest Airlink Flight 2268, operated by Fischer Brothers Aviation, a CASA C-212 N160FB was on a scheduled flight from Mansfield to Detroit with an intermediate stop in Cleveland when it crashed while landing at Detroit Metropolitan Wayne County Airport. The plane yawed violently to the left about 70 feet above the runway, skidded to the right, hit 3 ground support vehicles in front of Concourse F, and caught fire. Out of 19 occupants onboard (16 passengers and 3 crew), 9 were killed. The cause of the crash was determined to be pilot error.
- December 1, 1993: Northwest Airlink Flight 5719 being operated by Express Airlines I, a Jetstream 31, was flying a scheduled flight from Minneapolis-Saint Paul International Airport to International Falls with an en-route stop in Hibbing when it crashed while approaching for landing at Chisholm-Hibbing Airport. The plane descended struck the tops of trees and then two ridges and came to rest inverted on its right side. All 18 occupants (16 passengers and 2 crew) died. The cause of the crash was the lack of crew-coordination and loss of awareness of the altitude during a night instrument landing.
- October 14, 2004: Pinnacle Airlines Flight 3701 was a Bombardier CRJ200 with a crew of two operating a ferry flight (with no passengers) from Little Rock, Arkansas to Minneapolis, Minnesota. It crashed in a residential area in Jefferson City, Missouri due to the flight crew pushing the plane past its capabilities and ignoring warnings. Both pilots were killed.
- April 12, 2007: Pinnacle Airlines Flight 4712, a Bombardier CRJ200 from Minneapolis–Saint Paul International Airport overran the runway when landing at Cherry Capital Airport (TVC), Traverse City, Michigan. The plane was damaged, but no one was injured. The NTSB determined that the cause of the accident was the "pilots’ decision to land at TVC without performing a landing distance assessment", which in turn was caused by fatigued pilots and unclear directions from the TVC controller tower. The report recommended more landing distance training, post-accident drug testing, and further criteria for runway closures in snow and ice conditions.

== See also ==
- List of defunct airlines of the United States
