= Northwest Airlink Flight 5719 =

1993 aviation accident in Minnesota

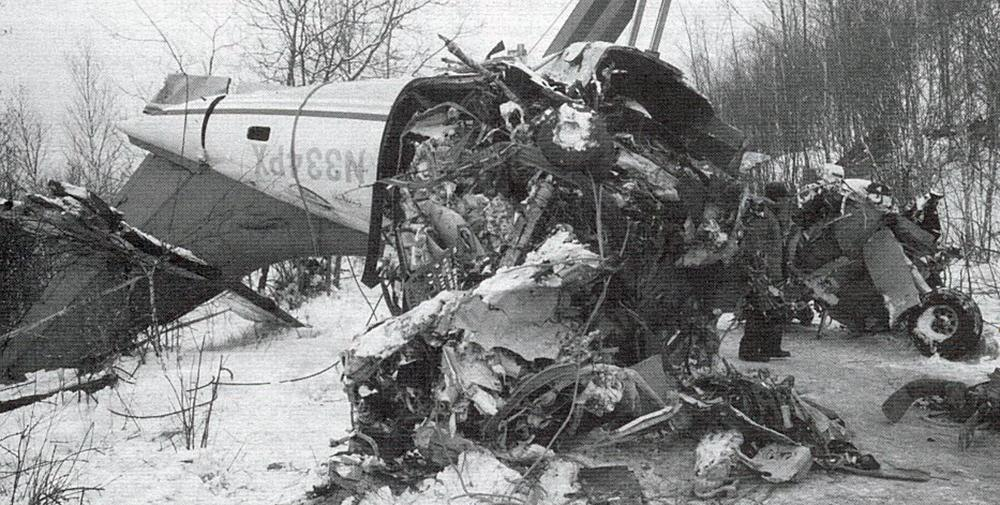
- Wreckage of the aircraft

Accident
- Date: December 1, 1993
- Summary: Controlled flight into terrain due to pilot error, and lack of crew coordination and altitude awareness
- Site: East of Chisholm-Hibbing Airport, Hibbing, Minnesota; 47°25′21″N 92°53′59″W

Aircraft
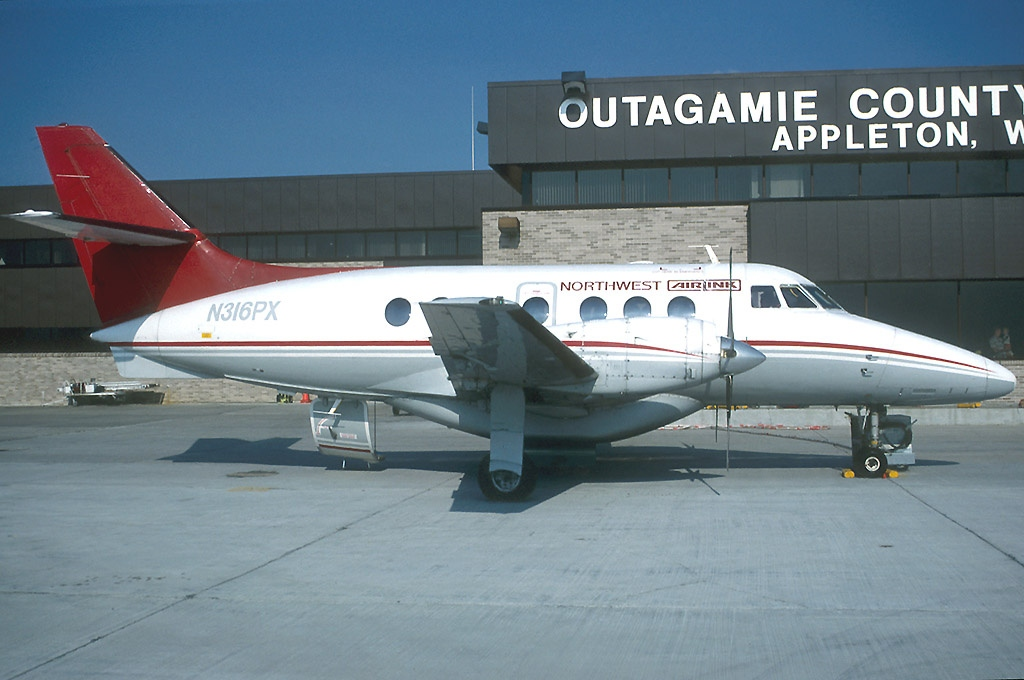
- A Northwest Airlink British Aerospace Jetstream 31, similar to the one involved in the accident
- Aircraft type: British Aerospace Jetstream 31
- Operator: Express Airlines II on behalf of Northwest Airlink
- Call sign: TWIN CITY 719
- Registration: N334PX
- Flight origin: Minneapolis-Saint Paul International Airport
- Stopover: Chisholm-Hibbing Airport
- Destination: International Falls Airport
- Occupants: 18
- Passengers: 16
- Crew: 2
- Fatalities: 18
- Survivors: 0

Northwest Airlink Flight 5719 was a flight from Minneapolis-Saint Paul International Airport to International Falls Airport in International Falls, Minnesota with a scheduled intermediate stop at Chisholm-Hibbing Airport in Hibbing, Minnesota. On December 1, 1993, the Jetstream 31, operated by Express Airlines II as Northwest Airlink, collided with a group of trees in a forest during final approach to Hibbing, and crashed into two ridges northwest of the airport, killing all sixteen passengers and the two pilots on board.

== Passengers and crew ==
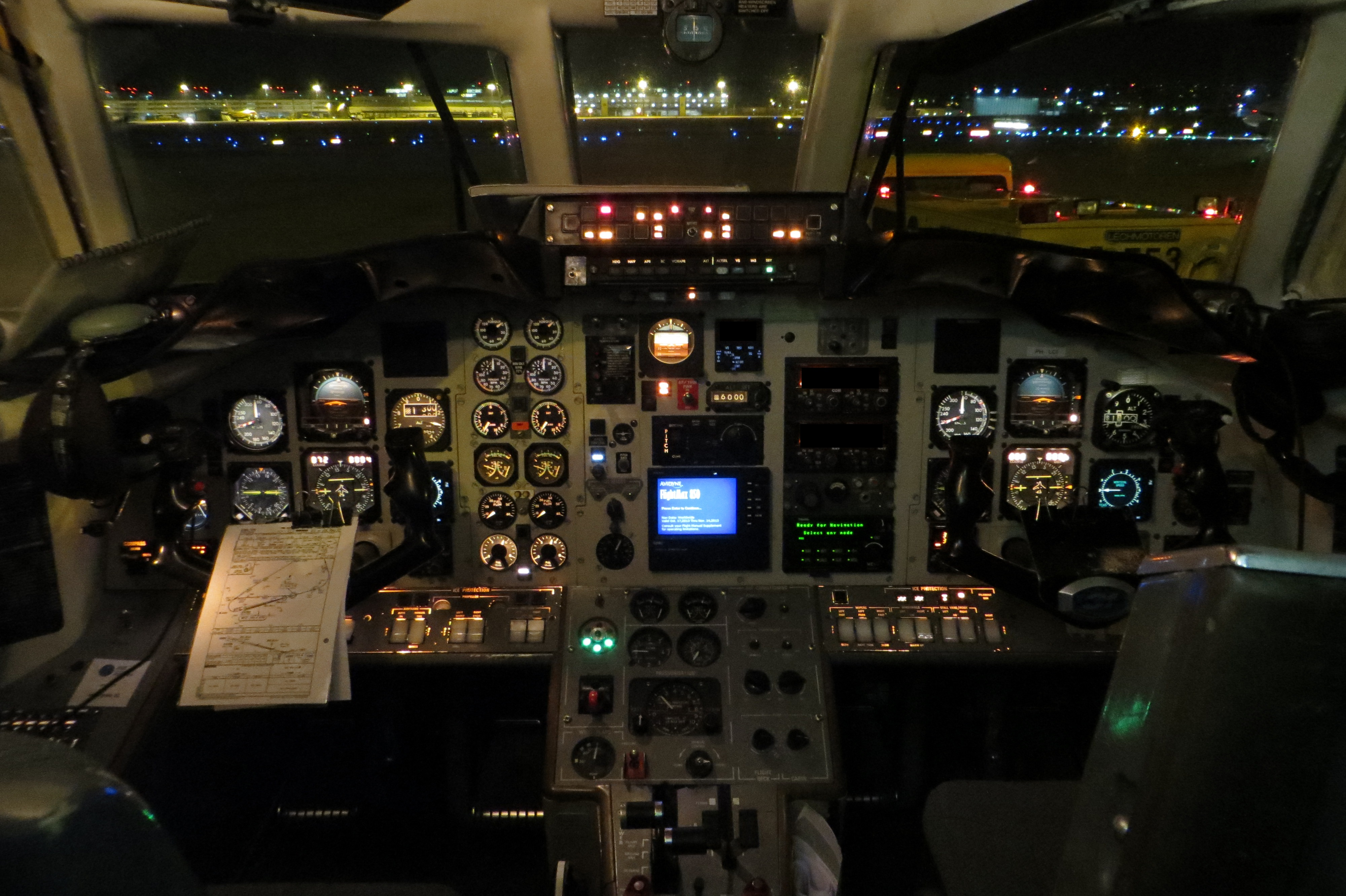
Cockpit of a Jetstream 31

There were 16 passengers on board the Jetstream 31, a twin-engine turboprop manufactured by British Aerospace, for a flight from Minneapolis-Saint Paul International Airport, with a stop at Chisholm-Hibbing Airport, in Hibbing. There were two pilots operating the aircraft: the captain was Marvin Falitz (42); the first officer was Chad Erickson (25). At the time of this flight, Erickson had 65 hours experience flying this type of aircraft. Captain Falitz was flying the aircraft at the time of the crash. He had failed proficiency checks previously in 1988, 1992, and earlier in 1993, but passed the most recent test in November 1993.

== Flight ==
Flight 5719 took off over 40 minutes late from Minneapolis-St. Paul. This was due to a late arrival and the replacement of landing light bulbs in Minneapolis-St. Paul. The aircraft was further delayed when it was deemed overweight for departure, requiring the removal of one passenger from the aircraft.

== Accident ==
Until moments before the crash, Flight 5719 was uneventful and no emergency was declared. The plane was cleared for a landing on runway 31 at Hibbing, but the flight crew requested an approach to runway 13 instead, because there was a tailwind on the approach to runway 31, which was also covered with precipitation. The flight crew initiated the approach procedure by joining the Hibbing distance measuring equipment (DME) arc from the Hibbing VHF omnidirectional range (VOR) radio navigation system, and intercepting the instrument landing system localizer at 8,000 feet (2,400 m) MSL. That delayed the start of the plane's descent, which meant that an excessive rate of descent was required. The aircraft descended at 2,000 feet (610 m) /min and was 1,200 feet (370 m) above the minimum altitude when above the Kinney final approach fix. The Jetstream 31 was not equipped with a ground proximity warning system that had already been made mandatory for larger aircraft.

The aircraft continued its descent through the 2,040-foot (620 m) step-down altitude. It struck the top of a tree, continued for 634 feet (193 m), and struck a group of aspen trees. Finally, the plane collided with two ridges and came to rest inverted and lying on its right side.

== Investigation ==
At first, icing was considered as a possible cause of the crash. This was later ruled out as a factor by the National Transportation Safety Board (NTSB). The cause of the crash was the loss of altitude awareness; this led to a failure to maintain minimum descent altitude for the approach, resulting in an impact with trees and a ridge before the aircraft reached the runway.

Falitz was said to have a reputation for following company procedures and being meticulous with flight check lists, but three first officers accused him of being deliberately rough on the flight controls. A chief pilot described Falitz as competent, but prone to outbursts of anger – even taking out his anger on an operational plane doing dangerous maneuvers in-flight – and intimidating and provocative behavior with colleagues. Falitz was accused of once slapping a co-pilot's headphones in anger. His previous intimidation of first officers was noted by the investigators.

The concluding statement from the NTSB report (NTSB/AAR-94/05) provided the following probable cause for the crash of Northwest Airlink Flight 5719: "The captain's actions led to a breakdown in crew coordination and the loss of altitude awareness by the flight crew during an unstabilized approach in night instrument meteorological conditions. Contributing to the accident were: the failure of the company management to adequately address the previously identified deficiencies in airmanship and crew resource management of the captain; the failure of the company to identify and correct a widespread, unapproved practice during instrument approach procedures; and the Federal Aviation Administration's inadequate surveillance and oversight of the air carrier."

== In popular culture ==
The crash of Northwest Airlink Flight 5719 was covered in "Killer Attitude", a Season 17 (2017) episode of the internationally syndicated Canadian TV documentary series Mayday, also known as Air Disasters and other titles.

== See also ==
- Widerøe Flight 710
- Avianca Flight 410
- Alitalia Flight 404, another CFIT accident where the crew used poor crew resource management.
- British European Airways Flight 548, Kenya Airways Flight 507, and US-Bangla Airlines Flight 211, other cases where the toxic attitude of captains led to a breakdown in crew communication.
- Armavia Flight 967, a case where a captain flew his aircraft onto water after cursing at an air traffic controller.
