= Mesaba Airlines =

Regional airline of the United States (1944–2012)

IATA	ICAO	Call sign
XJ	MES	MESABA
- Founded: 1944 (as Mesaba Aviation)
- Commenced operations: February 4, 1973
- Ceased operations: January 4, 2012 (merged with Pinnacle Airlines to form Endeavor Air)
- Hubs: Detroit; Memphis; Minneapolis/St. Paul; New York–LaGuardia
- Parent company: Mesaba Holdings (1995–2007); Northwest Airlines (2007–2010); Delta Air Lines (Jan 2010–Jun 2010); Pinnacle Airlines Corp. (2010–2012)
- Headquarters: Eagan, Minnesota, U.S.
- Key people: John Spanjers (President)

Mesaba Aviation, Inc. (operating as Mesaba Airlines) was a regional airline in the United States that operated from 1944 until it merged with Pinnacle Airlines in 2012 to form Endeavor Air. It was based in Eagan, Minnesota. From 2010 to 2012, the airline was a wholly owned subsidiary of Pinnacle Airlines Corp. with code sharing flights operated as Delta Connection for Delta Air Lines and US Airways Express for US Airways. Previously, the airline operated code sharing service as Northwest Airlink and Northwest Jetlink on behalf of Northwest Airlines which subsequently merged with Delta. Mesaba also previously operated connecting flight services in association with Republic Airlines before this air carrier was subsequently merged into Northwest. Mesaba Airlines effectively ceased operations on January 4, 2012, when all aircraft and personnel were transitioned to the Pinnacle Airlines operating certificate. Mesaba's operating certificate was surrendered on July 31, 2012.

== History ==
Mesaba (from the Ojibwe language, misaabe: "Soaring Eagle") was founded in 1944 by Gordy Newstrom in the Mesabi Range city of Coleraine, Minnesota, and started operations in the same year under the name of Mesaba Aviation. It had one airplane, a Piper Cub purchased for $1,300, and it was used to shuttle employees of the Blandin Paper Mill Company from Grand Rapids, Minnesota, to Minneapolis. In 1950 Newstrom moved the company to Grand Rapids.

In 1973, the Halverson family of Duluth, Minnesota, bought Mesaba from Newstrom. Subsequently, they started regularly scheduled airline services serving Spencer, Iowa; Ely, MN; Virginia, MN; and Duluth.

The Swenson family of Thief River Falls, Minnesota, purchased Mesaba Aviation in 1977. They took the company public in 1982 as the airline began flying to destinations in Minnesota, North Dakota and South Dakota with Beechcraft Model 99 commuter turboprops.

In late 1984, Mesaba became a codeshare partner of Northwest Orient Airlines, flying regional and commuter turboprop aircraft as Northwest Airlink from small regional communities to the hub at Minneapolis-Saint Paul International Airport.

Mesaba began feeder service from Detroit Metropolitan Wayne County Airport to small airports across the east and midwest utilizing Fokker F27 and Fairchild Metroliner turboprop aircraft in 1988. Maintenance bases were established both in Detroit and Wausau, Wisconsin. The same year, Mesaba managed to add an additional 325 employees. It also expanded its network to four new routes including Cleveland, Dayton and Akron in Ohio, and Erie, Pennsylvania.

In 1991, Mesaba built two new hangar facilities, in Detroit and Wausau, Wisconsin, and added the first of 25 de Havilland Canada Dash 8 turboprop aircraft, leased from Northwest Airlines.

In 1995, Mesaba and Northwest reached an agreement to provide service with Saab 340 turboprop aircraft. By 1997, Mesaba added additional flights to several new cities including Aspen, Colorado, Bozeman, Montana and Montreal in Canada. In 1999, Forbes placed Mesaba at number 41 on their list of Top 200 Small Companies in America.

=== Growth into jet operations ===
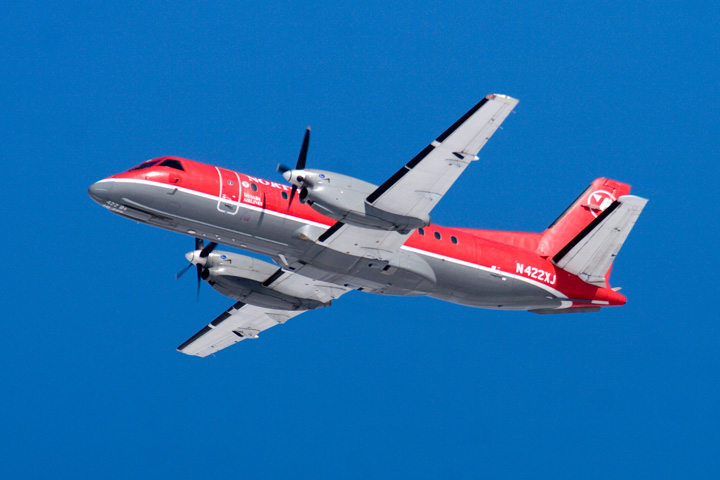
Mesaba Airlines Saab 340 in NWA Airlink livery, 2009.

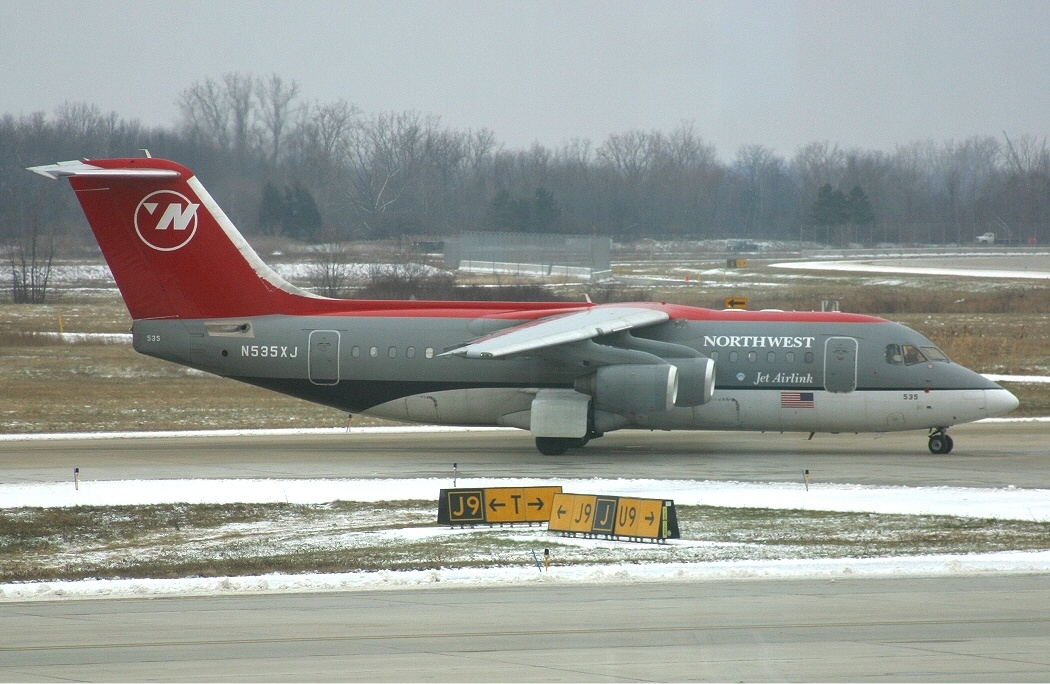
Mesaba-operated Avro RJ85 taxiing at Detroit Metropolitan Airport in 2003

The Northwest Airlines hub in Memphis was exclusively served by Airlink partner Express Airlines I, which later operated as Pinnacle Airlines and is now Endeavor Air, until 1997 when Mesaba initiated its first jet aircraft service using the Avro RJ85, the first jetliner type to be flown by either Airlink airline. The Avro RJ85 jetliner, which was a later model version of the BAe 146-200 featuring an improved cabin and more efficient engines, was operated on Northwest Jetlink flights with the aircraft being configured with 16 first class seats and 53 coach seats. This marked the first time a regional airline had offered first class as well as a coach on a regional jet aircraft. Mesaba was split off at this time into Airways Corporation in order to address objections from mainline pilots flying for Northwest concerning Mesaba's operation of a jet fleet. Mesaba also became the first regional airline to have a first class seating option via the Avro RJ85 jet, with this British-built four-engine aircraft being approximately twice as large as the 50-passenger regional jets manufactured by Canadair and Embraer. Eventually, as Pinnacle transitioned to an Bombardier CRJ regional jet fleet, Mesaba took over Northwest Airlink Saab 340 turboprop operations.

In 2000, the company took delivery of its final Avro RJ85 jet, along with eleven new Saab 340 turboprop aircraft. This made Mesaba the operator of the largest fleet of Avro RJ85 aircraft in the world with 36 of the type, and the second-largest operator of the Saab 340.

After the September 11 terrorist attacks, Mesaba was forced to reduce its workforce by 400 employees to achieve cost savings. In the fall of 2003, Northwest wanted to retire the Avro jet fleet, which comprised about half of Mesaba's revenue. They were inefficient and aging, according to Northwest. However, Mesaba was able to negotiate a deal with Northwest which enabled the Avro fleet to remain in service. In 2005, Mesaba began receiving fifteen new Canadair CRJ regional jets that would eventually replace the larger Avro jets.

=== Bankruptcy ===
On September 14, 2005, Northwest Airlines filed for Chapter 11 Bankruptcy protection. Subsequently, the airline withheld over US$25 million in payments from their regional partners, Mesaba and Pinnacle. Northwest proceeded to announce plans to ground the entire Avro jet fleet by Q1 2007, ten Saab 340B aircraft by January 2006, and also halt the delivery of the 13 remaining CRJs, leaving Mesaba with an awkward and expensive fleet of two aircraft types. Facing rising fuel costs, downsizing plans, and lack of income from Northwest, Mesaba filed for Chapter 11 Bankruptcy on October 13, 2005.

In an interview in January 2006, Mesaba President John Spanjers announced that the Mesaba fleet would be cut in half by the end of the year. Twelve Avro RJ85 jets had already been removed from the fleet, and the balance would be grounded by the end of the year. Ten Saab 340 "B" model aircraft were returned to Pinnacle Airlines (from whom they were leased) during January 2006 while the three remaining "A" model Saab 340's and the two Bombardier CRJ regional jets that had been delivered to Mesaba prior to bankruptcy would leave the fleet before mid-year. These changes left Mesaba with a fleet of 49 Saab 340 turboprops.

On April 14, 2006, the company announced reductions of the Avro RJ85 fleet, at Northwest Airlines' direction. The RJ85 jets ceased flying out of Memphis on June 8, Minneapolis/St. Paul on October 31, and Detroit on December 4, 2006. Separately it was announced that one of the two 50-seat CRJ200 regional jets operated by Mesaba would be transferred to Northwest in order to initiate flying operations (expected in late 2006) for newly formed Northwest Airlines subsidiary Compass Airlines.

By the end of October 2006, all three of the major unions representing the pilots, flight attendants, and mechanics reached tentative agreements that still needed to be approved by the membership. On November 27, 2006, the three unions announced that their membership had ratified the new agreements.

In December 2006, Northwest Airlines planned to purchase Mesaba Airlines from owner MAIR Holdings and operate it as a wholly owned subsidiary. Tentative agreements concerning the sale were made; however, the merger could not have been approved without going through bankruptcy board proceedings and approvals of regulators and various interest groups. On April 24, 2007, Mesaba Airlines emerged from bankruptcy protection and was officially acquired by Northwest Airlines.

With the merging of Northwest Airlines into Delta Air Lines, Mesaba underwent numerous changes as a subsidiary of the new company. A portion of the Saab 340 fleet was relocated to Atlanta. Delta also allocated five more CRJ900 regional jets to Mesaba to be operated out of Delta's Salt Lake City hub. In 2009, several routes were added, utilizing the new CRJ900s and the existing Saab 340 aircraft.

=== Fined for not deplaning passengers ===
On November 24, 2009, Mesaba was one of three airlines, including Continental Airlines and ExpressJet, fined by the US Department of Transportation (DOT) for delaying passengers from deplaning for over six hours overnight in Rochester, MN on August 8, 2009. Mesaba's civil penalty was US$75,000, 50% more than the fine for Continental and ExpressJet. It was the first fine ever from the DOT for misconduct related to passengers' being held in planes on the tarmac for an extended time.

When the ExpressJet flight was diverted to Rochester due to bad weather in Minneapolis, Mesaba personnel in the Rochester terminal agreed in advance to help deplane the passengers. However, when the plane landed, Mesaba personnel reneged, stating that there were no TSA personnel in the terminal. The DOT stated that the rules for such circumstances allow passengers to be deplaned and kept in a secure area, even when there are no TSA personnel available. The DOT ruled that the actions by Mesaba personnel constituted an "unfair and deceptive practice" because they had agreed to deplane the passengers. Continental and ExpressJet were fined because they did not follow their own internal procedures and passenger commitments, and were ultimately responsible for the passengers' welfare.

Since the incident, the ramp personnel in Rochester along with other ground stations handled by Mesaba, Comair, and Compass, have since been merged and renamed Regional Elite Airline Services (REAS).

=== Sale to Pinnacle ===
On July 1, 2010, Delta Air Lines sold Mesaba to Pinnacle Airlines Corporation for $62 million. The same day, Pinnacle Airlines Corporation announced that they intended to have Mesaba Airlines operate an all-turboprop fleet, whereas sister company, Pinnacle Airlines, would remain an all-jet operator. It was also announced that Pinnacle's other subsidiary, Colgan Air, would cease to exist, and Mesaba would inherit the Colgan fleet of Saab 340s and Bombardier Q400s. In time, all aircraft and personnel were transferred to Pinnacle Airlines.

In 2011, Mesaba Airlines began operating flights out of New York City's LaGuardia Airport for US Airways under the US Airways Express brand. This codeshare service utilized Saab 340 aircraft and replaced the service that was being operated by Colgan Air.

Ultimately Colgan's Bombardier Q400 turboprops were never transferred to Mesaba as they were retired from service by United Express, whom they operated for on a code sharing basis on behalf of United Airlines, before the transition from Colgan to Mesaba took place.

On January 4, 2012, Mesaba was folded into Pinnacle Airlines. Mesaba's operating certificate was surrendered on July 31, 2012. Mesaba Airlines ended operations as one of the world's safest air carriers with no fatalities recorded during its 68 years of operations.

== Awards ==
In early 1998, in recognition of the successful introduction of two new airliner types to the fleet (the Saab 340 and the Avro RJ85) while maintaining excellent operating performance, Mesaba Airlines was presented with the Air Transport World (ATW) "Regional Airline of the Year for 1997" award. Saab AB painted two new Saab 340 aircraft in special commemorative liveries celebrating both the award and Mesaba's 25th anniversary of scheduled airline service.

On August 31, 2005, Mesaba Airlines was named the winner of the 2005 Operational Excellence Award by AIG Aviation, a U.S. based underwriter of aviation insurance. The award has been presented only four times since its creation in 1998 and recognizes clients that exhibit a strong commitment to building quality safety and loss prevention programs. Mesaba was the unanimous selection out of an entry pool of more than 650 companies.

== Destinations ==
Over the years, Mesaba grew to operate a fleet of turboprop and turbofan powered airliners from Minneapolis-Saint Paul International Airport, Detroit Metropolitan Wayne County Airport, Memphis International Airport, John F. Kennedy International Airport, Salt Lake City International Airport and Hartsfield-Jackson Atlanta International Airport on code sharing flights primarily to small-to-medium-sized cities on behalf of its major airline partners.

Mesaba began operating as US Airways Express on behalf of US Airways in March 2011, replacing Colgan Air service, with seven Saab 340 aircraft to eight destinations served from New York LaGuardia Airport: Charlottesville, VA; Manchester, NH; Ithaca, NY; Syracuse, NY; Providence, RI; and Washington Dulles, as well as Martha's Vineyard, MA and Nantucket, MA with both of these destinations being served on a seasonal basis.

=== Destinations in 1981 ===
Mesaba was a small independent commuter air carrier at this time in June 1981 operating Beechcraft 99 turboprop aircraft on just one linear route: Minneapolis/St. Paul, MN - Brainerd, MN - Grand Rapids, MN.

=== Destinations in 1986 ===
Mesaba was operating Northwest Airlink code sharing flights in June 1986 for Northwest Airlines (which was operating as Northwest Orient at this time) with 19-passenger Fairchild Swearingen Metroliner ("Metro III" model) and 48-passenger Fokker F27 turboprops serving the following destinations:

- Aberdeen, SD
- Bemidji, MN
- Brainerd, MN
- Brookings, SD
- Cedar Rapids, IA
- Des Moines, IA
- Devils Lake, ND
- Duluth, MN
- Grand Rapids, MN
- Hibbing, MN
- Huron, SD
- Jamestown, ND
- Minneapolis/St. Paul, MN - **Hub**
- Moline, IL
- Mitchell, SD
- Pierre, SD
- Rapid City, SD
- Rochester, MN
- Sioux Falls, SD
- Thief River Falls, MN
- Wausau/Stevens Point, WI

=== Destinations served in 1999 from the Northwest Airlines hub in Minneapolis/St. Paul ===
Those destinations noted in bold were served in May 1999 by Mesaba with a Avro RJ85 jet aircraft operating as Northwest Jetlink code sharing flights from the Northwest hub located at the Minneapolis-St. Paul International Airport (MSP) with Northwest Airlink code share service from MSP to other destinations being operated by Mesaba with Saab 340 turboprop aircraft at this time:

- Aberdeen, SD
- Appleton, WI
- **Aspen, CO**
- Bemidji, MN
- Bismarck, ND
- Bloomington, IL/Normal, IL
- Brainerd, MN
- **Cedar Rapids, IA**
- **Cincinnati, OH**
- **Des Moines, IA**
- Dubuque, IA
- **Duluth, MN**
- Eau Claire, WI
- Escanaba, MI
- Ely, MN
- **Fargo, ND**
- **Flint, MI**
- Fort Dodge, IA
- **Grand Forks, ND**
- Grand Rapids, MN
- Green Bay, WI
- Hibbing, MN
- Houghton, MI/Hancock, MI
- International Falls, MN
- Kenora, Ontario, Canada
- La Crosse, WI
- Lincoln, NE
- Madison, WI
- Marquette, MI
- Mason City, IA
- **Minneapolis/St. Paul, MN** - **Hub**
- Moline, IL
- Omaha, NE
- Pellston, MI
- Peoria, IL
- **Pittsburgh, PA**
- Pierre, SD
- Rapid City, SD
- **Regina, Saskatchewan, Canada**
- Rhinelander, WI
- Rochester, MN
- Rockford, IL
- St. Cloud, MN
- **St. Louis, MO**
- Sioux City, IA
- **Sioux Falls, SD**
- **Steamboat Springs, CO** (served via the Yampa Valley Airport)
- Thief River Falls, MN
- Thunder Bay, Ontario, Canada
- **Traverse City, MI**
- Waterloo, IA
- Watertown, SD
- Wausau/Stevens Point, WI
- **White Plains, NY** (served via the Westchester County Airport)

According to the Official Airline Guide (OAG), by October 1999 Mesaba had extended its Northwest Jetlink Avro RJ85 service from the Northwest hub in Minneapolis/St. Paul to Green Bay, WI, Kalamazoo, MI, La Crosse, WI, Rochester, MN and Saginaw, MI in addition to the above destinations listed in bold.

=== Destinations served in 1999 from the Northwest Airlines hub in Memphis ===
In May 1999, Mesaba was operating all of its Northwest Airlines code sharing flights from the Northwest hub located at the Memphis International Airport (MEM) with Avro RJ85 jet aircraft with these Northwest Jetlink destinations noted in bold:

- **Atlanta, GA**
- **Cincinnati, OH**
- **Dallas/Fort Worth, TX**
- **Fayetteville, AR**
- **Huntsville, AL**
- **Knoxville, TN**
- **Memphis, TN** - **Hub**
- **St. Louis, MO**
- **Wichita, KS**

Another regional air carrier, Express Airlines I, was also operating code sharing flights at this time from Memphis for Northwest utilizing turboprop aircraft for its Northwest Airlink service.

According to the Official Airline Guide (OAG), by October 1999 Mesaba had extended its Northwest Jetlink Avro RJ85 service from the Northwest hub in Memphis to Grand Rapids, MI and Raleigh/Durham, NC.

=== Destinations served in 1999 from the Northwest Airlines hub in Detroit ===
Those destinations noted in bold were served in May 1999 by Mesaba with Avro RJ85 jet aircraft operating as Northwest Jetlink code sharing flights from the Northwest hub located at the Detroit Metropolitan Wayne County Airport (DTW) with Northwest Airlink code share service from DTW to other destinations being operated by Mesaba with Saab 340 turboprop aircraft as this time:

- Akron/Canton, OH
- **Allentown, PA**
- Alpena, MI
- Appleton, WI
- Benton Harbor, MI
- Binghamton, NY
- Bloomington, IL/Normal, IL
- **Buffalo, NY**
- Champaign/Urbana, IL
- Charleston, WV
- **Cincinnati, OH**
- Cleveland, OH
- **Columbus, OH**
- **Dayton, OH**
- **Detroit, MI** - **Hub**
- **Des Moines, IA**
- **Duluth, MN**
- Elmira, NY/Corning, NY
- Erie, PA
- Escanaba, MI
- Evansville, IN
- Flint, MI
- Fort Wayne, IN
- **Green Bay, WI**
- **Greensboro, NC**
- **Harrisburg, PA**
- Houghton, MI/Hancock, MI
- **Kalamazoo, MI**
- **Knoxville, TN**
- Lafayette, IN
- Lansing, MI
- Lexington, KY
- London, Ontario, Canada
- **Louisville, KY**
- **Madison, WI**
- Marquette, MI
- **Montreal, Quebec, Canada**
- Muskegon, MI
- Ottawa, Ontario, Canada
- Owensboro, KY
- Pellston, MI
- Peoria, IL
- **Pittsburgh, PA**
- **Portland, ME**
- Rhinelander, WI
- Roanoke, VA
- Rockford, IL
- Rochester, NY
- Saginaw, MI
- Sault Ste. Marie, MI
- South Bend, IN
- State College, PA
- Toledo, OH
- Traverse City, MI
- Wausau, WI/Stevens Point, WI
- **White Plains, NY** (served via the Westchester County Airport)
- Youngstown, OH

According to the Official Airline Guide (OAG), by October 1999 Mesaba had extended its Northwest Jetlink Avro RJ85 service from the Northwest hub in Detroit to Flint, MI, Lexington, KY, Saginaw, MI, South Bend, IN and Traverse City, MI in addition to the destinations listed above in bold.

== Fleet ==
The Mesaba Airlines fleet consisted of the following aircraft (as of September 7, 2011):

Aircraft	Total	Options	Passengers			Notes
Aircraft	Total	Options	F	Y	Total	Notes
Bombardier CRJ200	19	—	0	50	50	
Bombardier CRJ900	41	29	12	64	76	

=== Retired ===
Aircraft	Year retired	Notes	Replacement
Avro RJ85	2006	Operated as Northwest Jetlink flights on behalf of Northwest Airlines. Aircraft were configured with 16 first class seats and 53 coach seats. Majority transferred to Cityjet (Dublin, Ireland) One previously operated crashed in 2016	Bombardier CRJ900

== See also ==
- List of defunct airlines of the United States
