= Southland Field =

Southland Field West Calcasieu Airport
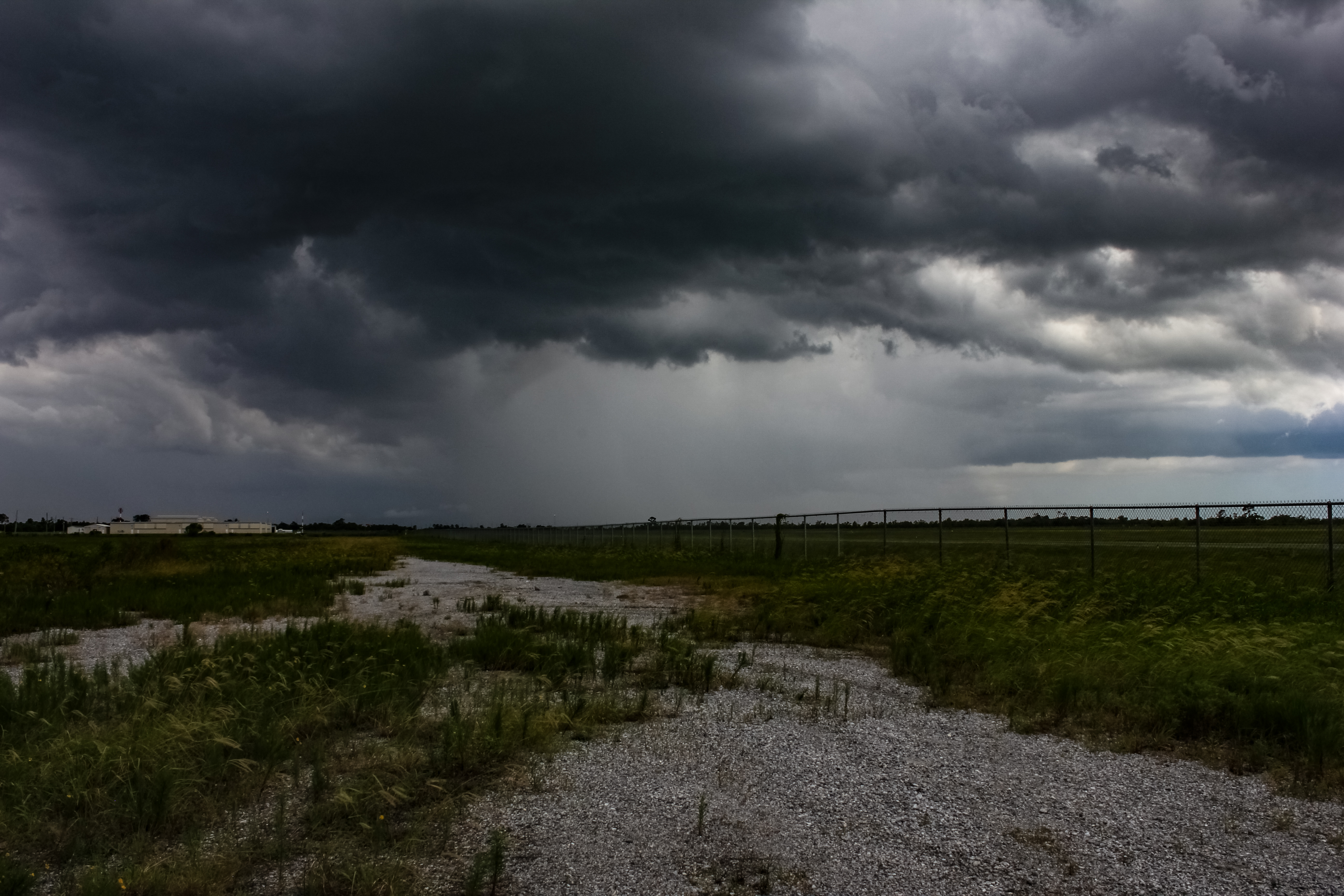
- IATA: none; ICAO: KUXL; FAA LID: UXL

Summary
- Airport type: Public
- Owner: West Calcasieu Airport Managing Board
- Serves: Sulphur, Louisiana
- Elevation AMSL: 10 ft / 3 m
- Coordinates: 30°07′53″N 093°22′34″W
- Interactive map of Southland Field

Runways
Direction	Length		Surface
Direction	ft	m	Surface
15/33	5,001	1,524	Asphalt

Statistics (2023)
- Aircraft operations (year ending 10/10/2023): 21,550
- Based aircraft: 15
- Source: Federal Aviation Administration

Southland Field (ICAO: KUXL, FAA LID: UXL, formerly L75) is a public-use airport located five nautical miles (9 km) south of the central business district of Sulphur, a city in Calcasieu Parish, Louisiana, United States. It is owned by the West Calcasieu Airport Managing Board and is also known as West Calcasieu Airport.

This airport is included in the FAA's National Plan of Integrated Airport Systems for 2009–2013, which categorized it as a general aviation facility. Although many U.S. airports use the same three-letter location identifier for the FAA and IATA, this facility is assigned UXL by the FAA but has no designation from the IATA.

== Facilities and aircraft ==
Southland Field covers an area of 278 acres (113 ha) at an elevation of 10 feet (3 m) above mean sea level. It has one runway designated 15/33 with an asphalt surface measuring 5,001 by 75 feet (1,524 x 23 m).

For the 12-month period ending October 10, 2023, the airport had 21,550 aircraft operations, an average of 59 per day: 99% general aviation and 1% military. At that time there were 15 aircraft based at this airport: 14 single-engine, and 1 multi-engine.

== Accidents and incidents ==
On September 7, 2011, Colgan Air Flight 3222, a Saab 340B (registered N352CJ) operated for Continental Connection with 23 passengers mistakenly landed at Southland Field instead of the nearby Lake Charles Regional Airport, which was its intended destination.

== See also ==
- List of airports in Louisiana
