= Pinnacle Airlines Corp. =

Defunct airline holding company of the United States (2002–2013)

Pinnacle Airlines Corporation
- Company type: Public
- Traded as: OTC Pink: PNCLQ
- Industry: Transportation
- Founded: 1985
- Defunct: 2013
- Headquarters: Memphis, Tennessee, United States
- Area served: United States
- Key people: Donald J. Breeding; Sean Menke; John Spanjers; Peter D. Hunt
- Revenue: US$845 million (2009)
- Operating income: US$80.7 million (2009)
- Net income: US$41.9 million (2009)
- Number of employees: 7,700
- Subsidiaries: Colgan Air (2007–2012); Mesaba Airlines (2010–2012); Pinnacle Airlines (2002–2013)

Pinnacle Airlines Corporation was an airline holding company in the United States, headquartered in Memphis, Tennessee, and was the parent company of Pinnacle Airlines, Colgan Air, and Mesaba Airlines. The company contracted its airlines to fly in the aircraft livery of other airlines such as Delta Air Lines, United Airlines and US Airways. The company filed for bankruptcy protection under Chapter 11 in 2012 and emerged from Chapter 11 in 2013 as a wholly owned subsidiary of Delta Air Lines. The company's only surviving airline, Pinnacle, became Endeavor Air.

== History ==
In the late 1990s, Northwest Airlines owned a subsidiary, Express Airlines I, Inc., that it wanted to break off as a separate entity. Pinnacle Airlines Corporation was created in January 2002 to hold the airline, which would be renamed Pinnacle Airlines, Inc. The changes took place on May 8, 2002. In November 2003, Pinnacle Airlines Corporation became a publicly traded company, using the ticker symbol PNCL on NASDAQ.

In 2007, Pinnacle acquired Colgan Air, which continued to operate independently of Pinnacle Airlines, Inc. The acquisition of Colgan Air was a $20 million strategic move in order to gain access to Colgan’s partners, Continental Airlines, United Airlines and US Airways.

On July 1, 2010, Delta Air Lines sold Mesaba Airlines to Pinnacle in a $62 million transaction. Mesaba's fleet consisted of 41 CRJ-900s, 18 CRJ-200s, and several Saab 340 aircraft. After acquisition, Pinnacle merged all three subsidiary airlines into one. All pilots flying for Mesaba and Colgan eventually became pilots for Pinnacle Airlines, Inc.

On 1 April 2012, Pinnacle Airlines Corporation and subsidiaries filed for bankruptcy protection under Chapter 11 of the United States Bankruptcy Code. The airline subsidiaries discontinued all operations of Saab 340 and Bombardier Q400 turboprop aircraft by the end of November 2012. On May 1, 2013, Pinnacle Airlines Corporation emerged from chapter 11 reorganization as a wholly owned subsidiary of Delta Air Lines. The company's main airline, Pinnacle Airlines, Inc., was renamed to Endeavor Air on August 1, 2013 and the holding company ceased to exist.

On September 27, 2018, former Pinnacle Airlines CEO Philip Trenary was shot dead in Memphis.

== Headquarters ==
Pinnacle Airlines Corp. had their headquarters in Memphis, Tennessee, near the airport, inking a 13-year lease to become the anchor tenant in the 29-story office tower.

In 2010, Pinnacle Airlines Corp. considered moving its headquarters to Downtown Memphis and to Olive Branch, Mississippi in Greater Memphis. Pinnacle selected One Commerce Square in Downtown Memphis. The Center City Commission, the City of Memphis, and Shelby County gave out $10 million in incentives, including free parking, to convince Pinnacle to move to Downtown Memphis.
