= Range Regional Airport =

- IATA: HIB; ICAO: KHIB; FAA LID: HIB

Summary
- Airport type: Public
- Owner: Chisholm-Hibbing Airport
- Serves: Hibbing, Minnesota
- Elevation AMSL: 1,354 ft (413 m)
- Coordinates: 47°23′12″N 092°50′20″W
- Website: RangeRegionalAirport.com

Maps
- FAA airport diagram
- Location within Minnesota Location within the United States

Runways
Direction	Length		Surface
Direction	ft	m	Surface
13/31	6,758	2,060	Asphalt
4/22	3,075	937	Asphalt

Statistics (2022)
- Aircraft operations: 28,850
- Based aircraft: 42
- Source: Federal Aviation Administration

Range Regional Airport (IATA: HIB, ICAO: KHIB, FAA LID: HIB) is a public use airport located four nautical miles (5 mi, 7 km) southeast of the central business district of Hibbing, in Saint Louis County, Minnesota, United States. It was formerly known as Chisholm-Hibbing Airport or Chisholm-Hibbing Municipal Airport. The airport is mostly used for general aviation but is also served by one commercial and one charter airline. Scheduled passenger service is subsidized by the Essential Air Service program.

As per Federal Aviation Administration records, the airport had 8,896 passenger boardings (enplanements) in calendar year 2008, 8,926 enplanements in 2009, and 11,227 in 2010. It is included in the National Plan of Integrated Airport Systems for 2011–2015, which categorized it as a non-primary commercial service airport based on 2008 enplanements (between 2,500 and 10,000), but would be considered primary commercial service based on enplanements in 2010.

== Facilities and aircraft ==
Range Regional Airport covers an area of 1,600 acres (647 ha) at an elevation of 1,354 feet (413 m) above mean sea level. It has two runways with asphalt surfaces: 13/31 is 6,758 by 150 feet (2,060 x 46 m) and 4/22 is 3,075 by 75 feet (937 x 23 m).

For the 12-month period ending December 31, 2022, the airport had 28,850 aircraft operations, an average of 79 per day: 84% general aviation, 8% air taxi, 9% scheduled commercial and <1% military. At that time, there were 42 aircraft based at this airport: 40 single-engine, 1 multi-engine and 1 helicopter.

=== Ground transportation ===
Range Regional Airport is located off U.S. Highway 169 near Hibbing. Parking and car rental services are available on-site.

=== Public bus transportation ===
Local public transit is provided by Arrowhead Transit, which offers demand-response service to the airport through its Hibbing Dial-A-Ride program.

== Airline and destination ==
=== Passenger ===
Airlines	Destinations
Delta Connection	Minneapolis/St. Paul

Destination map
Destination from Range Regional Airport

=== Top destinations ===
Busiest routes from HIB (September 2023 - August 2024)
Rank	City	Passengers	Carriers
1	Minneapolis/St. Paul	11,000	Delta Connection

== Accidents and incidents ==
2 January 1993: An Express Airlines Saab 340A crashed hard onto the runway at Chisholm-Hibbing Municipal Airport due to wing ice accretion. There were no fatalities, but the aircraft was destroyed.

1 December 1993: Northwest Airlink Flight 5719 crashed while on approach to Chisholm-Hibbing Airport. All 18 passengers and crew on board were killed.

== See also ==
- List of airports in Minnesota
