= Acey =

Acey may refer to:

- Acey Abbey, former Cistercian abbey in Jura, France
- Acey-deucey, backgammon variant
- Acey (name)
- The callsign for ExpressJet Airlines and aha!, and formerly Atlantic Southeast Airlines.
