= Hickory Regional Airport =

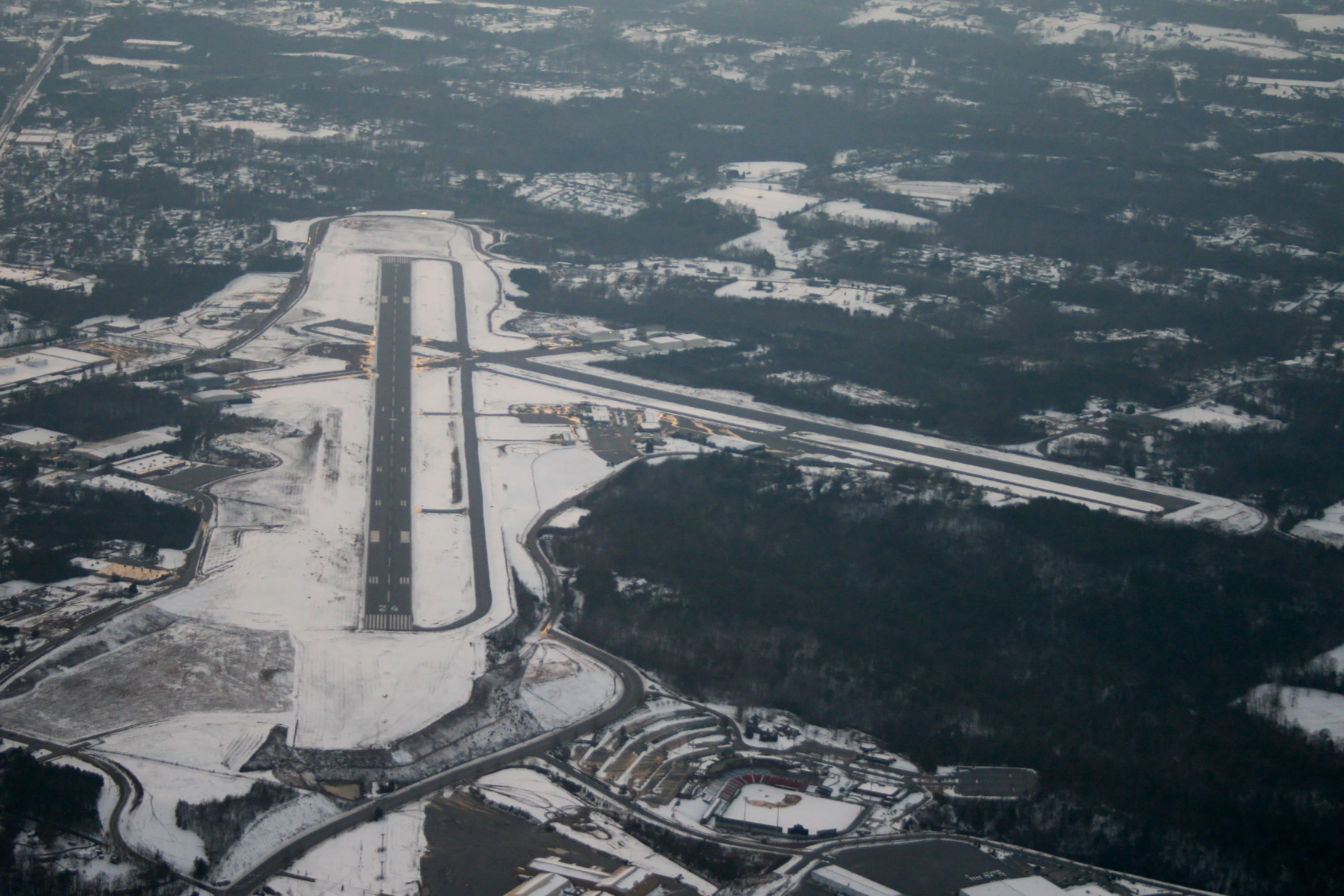
- IATA: HKY; ICAO: KHKY; FAA LID: HKY

Summary
- Airport type: Public
- Owner: City of Hickory
- Serves: Hickory, North Carolina
- Location: Hickory, NC 28601
- Elevation AMSL: 1,190 ft (360 m)
- Coordinates: 35°44′28″N 081°23′22″W
- Website: https://www.hickorync.gov/airport
- Interactive map of Hickory Regional Airport

Runways
Direction	Length		Surface
Direction	ft	m	Surface
6/24	6,401	1,951	Asphalt
1/19	4,400	1,341	Asphalt

Statistics (2022)
- Aircraft operations (year ending 6/1/2022): 29,895
- Source: Federal Aviation Administration

Hickory Regional Airport (IATA: HKY, ICAO: KHKY, FAA LID: HKY) is three miles (5 km) west of Hickory, in Catawba County, North Carolina. It is owned by the City of Hickory.

== Facilities ==
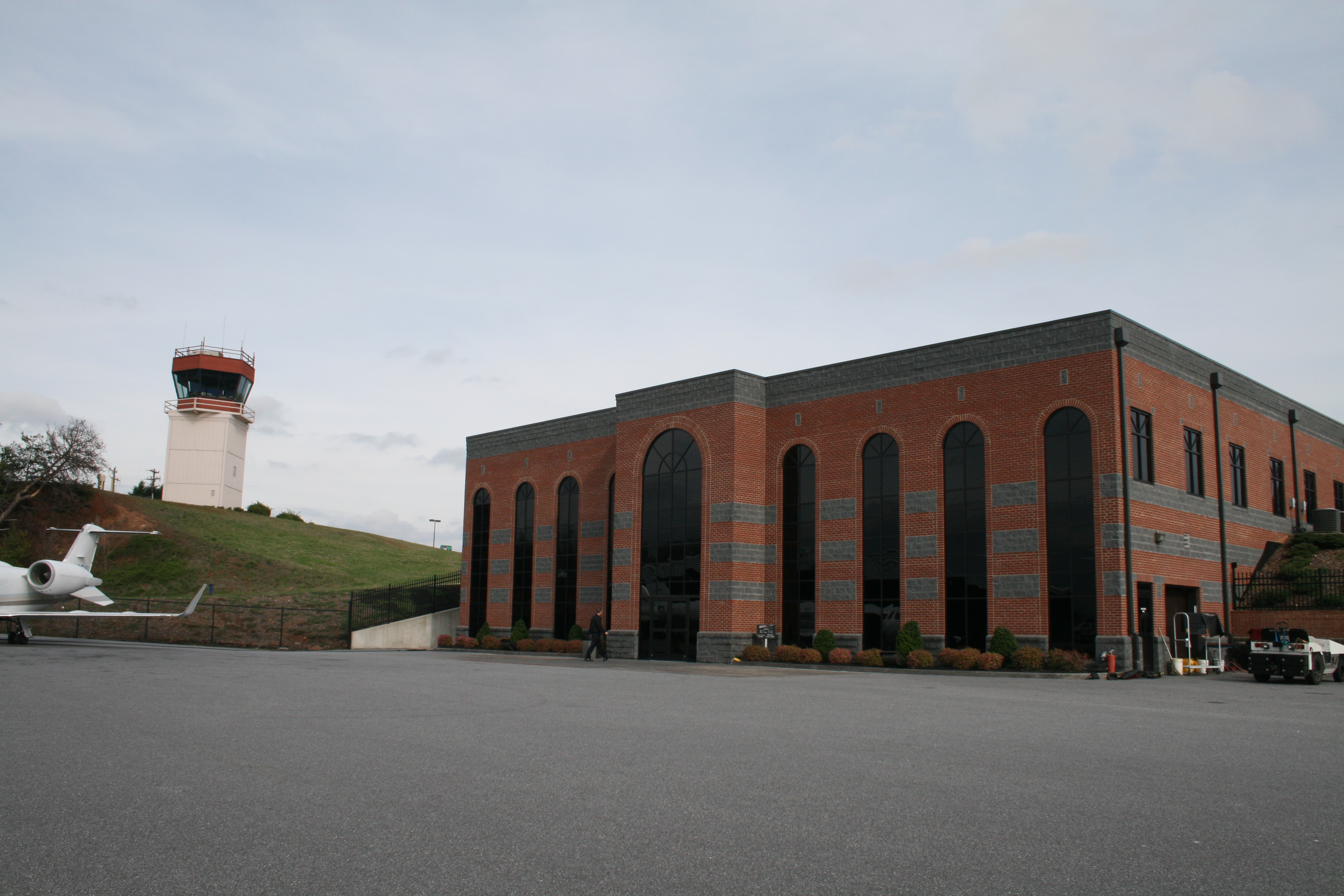
FBO and Control Tower

Hickory Regional Airport covers 739 acres (299 ha) and has two asphalt runways: 6/24 is 6,401 x 150 ft. (1,951 x 46 m) and 1/19 is 4,400 x 150 ft. (1,341 x 46 m). In the year ending June 1, 2022, the airport had 29,895 aircraft operations, average 82 per day: 83% general aviation, 13% air taxi, 3% military, and <1% commercial. 70 aircraft were then based at the airport.

The airport has an operating control tower from 7:00am to 9:00pm daily. For weather information, the airport uses an automated airport weather station (ASOS).

The airport terminal building was built in 1960. The most recent airline, Delta Connection, ceased operation from Hickory in 2005. The building houses airport administration and maintenance, a café, rental cars, a bus service, as well as the Hickory Aviation Museum.

In 2003 a new building was built for the general aviation community. Several flight instructors teach at the Hickory Regional Airport. Airplane rental is provided through various private entities. Instruction is provided on an individual basis under Part 61 for sport pilots, private pilots, commercial pilots, and other ratings, and under Part 141 through the flight school at Caldwell Community College & Technical Institute, where the knowledge component is taught in a classroom setting.

Riverhawk Aviation (and its subsidiary companies), which was the airport's only FBO, voluntarily filed for Chapter 11 bankruptcy. On December 8, 2011, the United States bankruptcy court, having found that Riverhawk did not have the assets to continue as a viable company, removed Riverhawk as the FBO. On December 9, 2011, the City of Hickory assumed all FBO operations in order to insure no interruption in general aviation services occurred at the airport.

On Monday, October 23, 2017, an EF2 tornado (confirmed by the National Weather Service's Greenville/Spartanburg bureau) occurred at the airport, destroying two hangars and several privately owned planes, along with several vehicles. Winds were estimated at a maximum of 125 mph as the storm slammed the airport's north side. A new hangar began to be built where the previous hangar stood, completing construction in early 2021.

== Aircraft Rescue and Firefighting ==
The Hickory Fire Department provides aircraft rescue and firefighting (ARFF) services to the Hickory Regional Airport. The fire department staffs an ARFF truck, known as Engine 4, with one firefighter 24 hours a day, 7 days a week.

== History ==
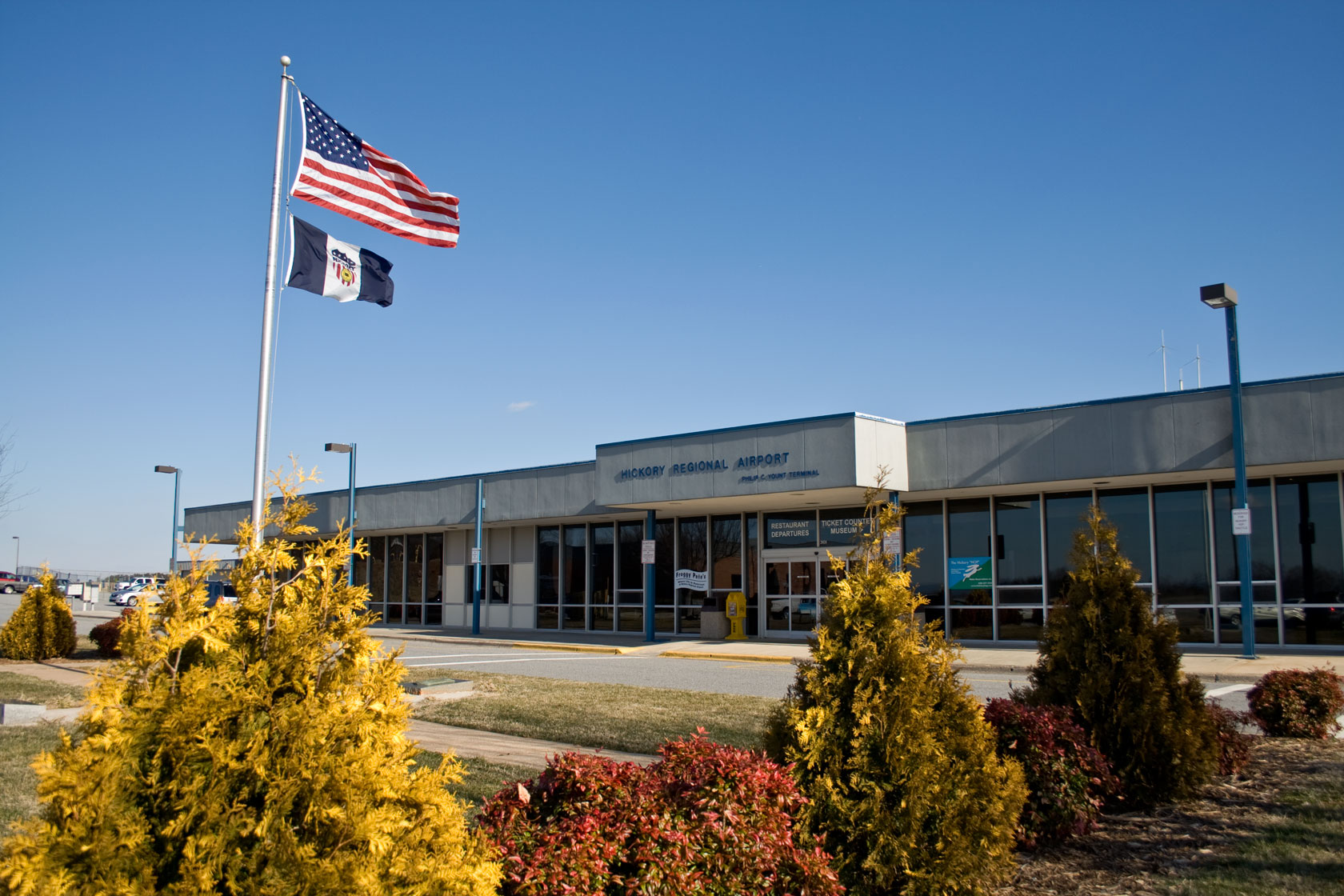
Current terminal built in 1960

Hickory Municipal Airport opened on May 17, 1940, with two unpaved runways, 2,700 and 3,100 feet long. Shortly thereafter, the runway later designated 6/24 was lengthened and both runways were paved. On August 2, 1941, Pennsylvania Central Airline (later Capital Airlines) brought the first airline service: one Boeing 247 flight each way between Norfolk and Knoxville. This was suspended in May, 1942.

During the war years the Hickory Municipal Airport was a Pilot Training center for the Military. In 1947 the Civil Aeronautics Administration opened the Hickory Interstate Airways Communications Station, housed in a wooden structure on the south side of the field, at the former FBO site. As the Flight Service Station, this operation is now housed, along with a portion of the Systems Maintenance Sector, in the modern Terminal Building. The main offices for the Systems Maintenance Sector are now in the FBO office building. In May 1950 the City of Hickory contracted for the construction of a North-South Runway (runway 1/19), 4,400 feet in length. Capital Airlines resumed scheduled service in August 1951, and continued until August 1952, at which time Piedmont Airlines began to serve Hickory. Runway 6/24 has been extended twice, to its present length of 6,402 feet. A full Instrument Landing System (ILS) was installed on runway 24, and commissioned in 1977. A MALSR Approach Lighting System was also installed on this runway.

In 1960 the base of operations was moved from the south side of the field when the new terminal building opened. In the mid-1960s, the Fixed-Base Operator, Cannon Aviation, Inc., also moved from the south side of the field, into new quarters next to the Terminal. The Fixed-Base Operation was later bought by a locally formed corporation, Carolina Airways, Inc., and since that time, the FBO has changed owners several times and two expansions have been completed.

In early 1969 a new High Intensity Lighting system (HIRL) was installed on runway 6/24 as well as lighting on the parallel taxiway. A new taxiway, with lighting, was built parallel to runway 1/19. In the same improvements project, runway 6/24 was overlaid to increase pavement strength and a new 36-inch Airport Beacon was installed.

In Fall 1973 the Federal Aviation Administration commissioned an Air Traffic Control Tower at the Hickory Airport.

== Airlines ==
On August 2, 1941, Pennsylvania Central Airlines which later became Capital Airlines, brought the first scheduled air-carrier service to Hickory. This service was interrupted by World War II, and was suspended in May, 1942. Capital Airlines resumed scheduled service in August 1951, continuing until August 1952 when Piedmont Airlines (1948–1989) replaced it. From 1952 to 1980 Piedmont Airlines Douglas DC-3s, Martin 404s, Fokker F27s, Fairchild Hiller FH-227s, and NAMC YS-11s flew to cities such as Asheville, Charlotte, Winston-Salem, Tri-Cities Area and Atlanta.

After airline deregulation in the late 1970s, smaller, commuter airline service would be offered to large hubs. Atlantis Airlines (1979–1985) was one of this type, with up to six daily flights to Charlotte and Atlanta. The period of 1978–2002 would also see Sunbird Airlines (later CCAir) operate up to 11 daily flights using Cessna 402 and Cessna 404(s), Beechcraft Model 99s, Shorts 330s and Shorts 360s, DeHavilland Canada Dash 8s, and BAE Jetstream 32s. These would operate under the marketing names of Sunbird Airlines, Piedmont Commuter, and finally US Airways Express. CCAir would be later acquired by Mesa Airlines who would end its US Airways Express flights to Charlotte-Douglas International Airport in April 2002.

In 2005 Delta Connection (Atlantic Southeast Airlines) Bombardier CRJ200s flew direct to Atlanta Hartsfield-Jackson International Airport, before ceasing service in the fall of that year.

The airport sees seasonal charters conducted by collegiant athletic teams. Sun Country Airlines, Allegiant Air, and Freight Runners Express fulfill these charters. These charters are flown on Boeing 737 Next Generation, Airbus A320 Family aircraft, and Saab 2000s respectively.

Local officials do not believe that commercial airline service will return because of the close proximity to Charlotte-Douglas International Airport, but the airport is self-sustaining and has maintained a relatively high traffic volume.

== Accidents near HKY ==
- On August 28, 1985, a Sunbird Airlines Beechcraft Model 99 on a co-pilot qualification flight crashed 6.9 miles east of HKY because of a loss of control during a pitch trim emergency simulation at 5500 feet. All three occupants were killed.
- On April 1, 2025, a Cessna 172N Skyhawk veered off the side of the runway at Hickory during a solo training flight, resulting in the pilot having minor injuries. The NTSB stated the crash was due to a stall or a spin during a go-around.

== See also ==
- List of airports in North Carolina
