= Kinston Regional Jetport =

Airport in Lenoir County, North Carolina

Kinston Regional Jetport Stallings Field
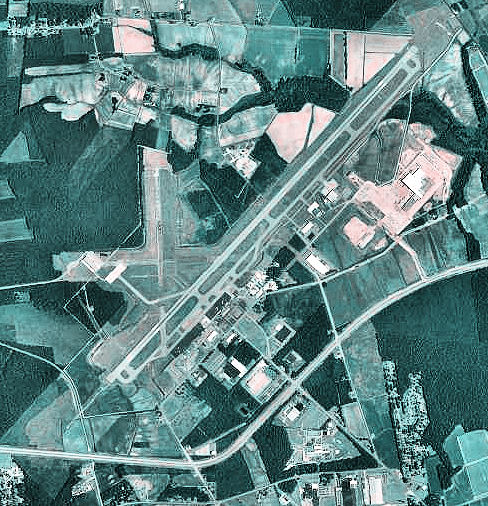
- USGS 2006 orthophoto
- IATA: ISO; ICAO: KISO; FAA LID: ISO

Summary
- Airport type: Public
- Owner: North Carolina Global TransPark Authority
- Serves: Kinston, Goldsboro, Ayden, Grifton, and Eastern NC communities
- Location: Kinston, North Carolina
- Elevation AMSL: 94 ft (29 m)
- Coordinates: 35°19′53″N 77°36′32″W
- Website: www.ncgtp.com

Map
- Location of airport in North Carolina/United States ISO (the United States)

Runways
| Direction | Length | | Surface |
| Direction | ft | m | Surface |
|---|---|---|---|
| 5/23 | 11,500 | 3,505 | Asphalt |

Kinston Regional Jetport (IATA: ISO, ICAO: KISO, FAA LID: ISO), also known as Stallings Field, is a public airport located three miles (5 km) northwest of the central business district of Kinston, a city in Lenoir County, North Carolina. The airport has a single runway that is one of the longest in the southeastern United States. It is mostly used for general aviation.

East Carolina University utilizes the airport for flights involving its athletic teams and other university personnel. Teams visiting ECU also fly in and out of Kinston. Its runway is long enough to accommodate large jets chartered by college football teams.

The Kinston Regional Jetport features free parking as well as free wireless Internet access in its terminal. The terminal also houses several businesses, including Philbros Gift and Coffee Shop as well as Robert Franchise Transportation, a commercial transportation service. Rental car agencies are located in the terminal.

One of the central features of the Kinston Regional Jetport is the Global TransPark (GTP), an industrial park adjoining the airport. It was built to bring high-tech industry and economic development to eastern North Carolina.

Spirit AeroSystems manufactures parts of the Airbus A350 at its Kinston facility at GTP.

== History ==
Kinston Jetport originally was built in 1944 by the United States Navy. It opened in October as a United States Marine Corps flying training airfield known as Marine Corps Auxiliary Airfield Kinston, being an auxiliary to Marine Corps Air Station Cherry Point. Naval Aviation Cadets received V-5 flight training along with basic flying indoctrination at the airfield until the facility was closed on 31 October 1945.

As a result of the Cold War and the expansion of the United States Air Force, Kinston Air Base* was reopened on 17 October 1950 by the USAF Air Training Command, as a contract flying training school with T-34 Mentor, T-6 Texan and T-28 Trojan aircraft. In May 1952, the Air Force renamed Kinston Airfield as Stallings Air Base in memory of Kinston natives Lt Bruce Stallings, a P-51 Mustang pilot killed in March 1945, and his brother, Lt Harry Stallings, a B-29 Superfortress navigator killed in April 1945.

In April 1957, ATC proposed that the contract training program at Stallings AB be closed. The recommendation was approved in September and on 1 October, flying training ended at Stallings. The base was formally inactivated on 27 November 1957.

The present air terminal opened in July 1978. The airport served as a regional facility for eastern North Carolina and was listed in timetables for Piedmont Airlines as Kinston/Goldsboro/Greenville/Camp LeJeune, NC. As the nearby cities of Greenville, New Bern and Jacksonville, NC built up their own service in the 1980s and 1990s, passenger traffic at Kinston declined until all airline service was discontinued by the beginning of 2000. Later attempts were made to revive commercial air service but were unsuccessful.

=== Historical airline service ===
Piedmont Airlines provided service from Kinston to various destinations in North Carolina and Virginia from the early 1950s. By the early 1980s, Piedmont operated scheduled routes connecting Kinston to Atlanta, New York LaGuardia Airport, Richmond, VA, Washington National, and Wilmington, NC using a combination of Boeing 727-200, and Boeing 737-200 jets as well as YS-11 and F-27 prop aircraft. Nonstop flights to Charlotte Douglas International Airport were added in 1981 and to Baltimore/Washington International Airport in 1984. Charlotte and Baltimore would become major hubs for Piedmont. Piedmont Commuter service operated by CCAir and Henson supplemented Piedmont's service.

Piedmont merged into USAir on August 5, 1989 and USAir continued to serve Kinston with mainline Fokker F28 jets until May, 1992. USAir Express service operated by CCAir (formerly Piedmont Commuter) continued to serve Kinston until January 2, 2000; its withdrawal left Kinston without scheduled service.

American Airlines briefly served Kinston with flights to Raleigh-Durham International Airport from May through October, 1990 by way of its American Eagle partner, Nashville Eagle. Jetstream 31 commuter aircraft were flown.

Delta Air Lines began scheduled service from Kinston to Atlanta in March, 2005 by was of its Delta Connection partner, Atlantic Southeast Airlines, using Bombardier CRJ100/200 regional jets. Delta soon found the service consistently unprofitable, due in large part to many travelers driving to nearby Raleigh-Durham, and terminated the service on January 5, 2007.

Allegiant Air operated a twice weekly flight to Orlando Sanford International Airport from November 2006 to April, 2008 using McDonnell Douglas MD-80 aircraft.

Kinston was also served by other commuter airlines. Wheeler Airlines served the airport briefly in 1976 and again in 1985 with flights to Raleigh-Durham, Richmond, and Washington DC. Sunbird Airlines provided service to Charlotte and Raleigh Durham from 1980 until early 1985 using Cessna 402 and Beechcraft Model 99 aircraft. The carrier returned to Kinston by August 1985 operating as Piedmont Commuter and changed its name to CCAir in early 1986.

== Airlines and destinations ==
=== Cargo ===
| Airlines | Destinations |
|---|---|
| FedEx Express | Greensboro, Manteo/Dare County, Myrtle Beach |

== Accidents and incidents ==
- On November 14, 1970, Southern Airways Flight 932 crashed while carrying the Marshall University football team that had departed from the airport after a game against ECU. The 2006 movie We Are Marshall focuses on the aftermath of that crash.

== See also ==
- List of airports in North Carolina
