= Skywest =

Skywest may refer to:

- SkyWest Airlines, an airline serving the United States, Canada and Mexico
  - SkyWest, Inc., the parent company of SkyWest Airlines
- Skywest Airlines, now operating as Virgin Australia Regional Airlines
