= Anderson Regional Airport =

Airport in South Carolina, USA

Anderson Regional Airport Anderson Auxiliary Field
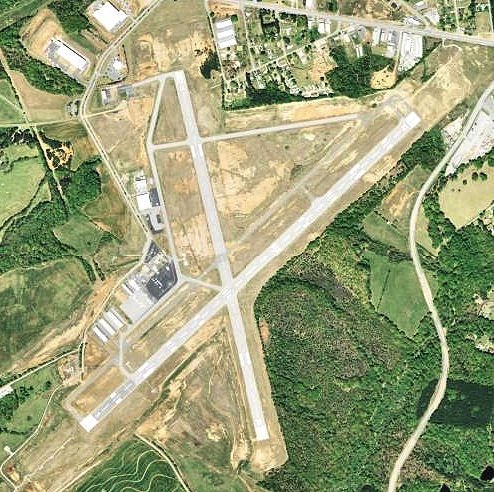
- 2006 USGS photo
- IATA: AND; ICAO: KAND; FAA LID: AND

Summary
- Airport type: Public
- Operator: County of Anderson
- Serves: Anderson, South Carolina
- Elevation AMSL: 782 ft (238 m)
- Coordinates: 34°29′41″N 082°42′34″W

Map
- Location within South Carolina

Runways
Direction	Length		Surface
Direction	ft	m	Surface
5/23	6,002	1,829	Asphalt
17/35	4,996	1,523	Asphalt

Helipads
Number	Length		Surface
Number	ft	m	Surface
H1	50	15	Concrete
H2	50	15	Concrete
- Source: Federal Aviation Administration

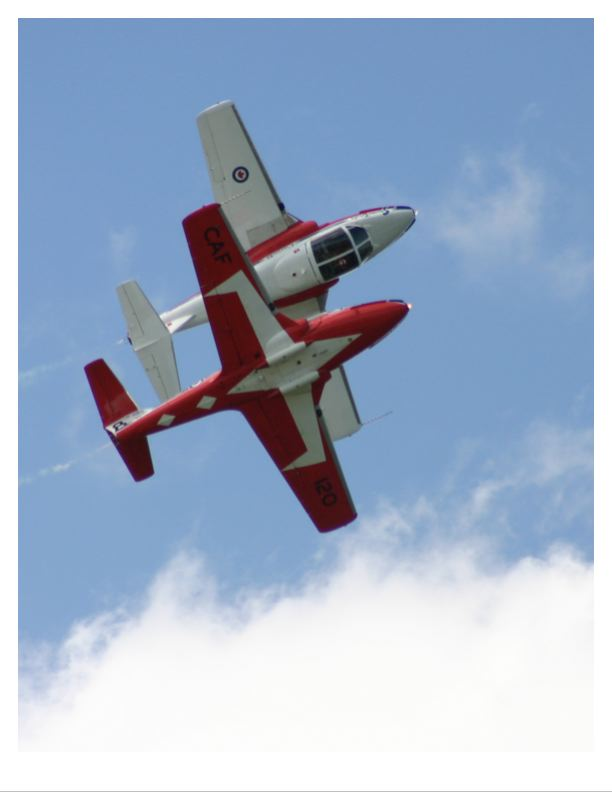
Snowbirds

Anderson Regional Airport (IATA: AND, ICAO: KAND, FAA LID: AND) is a public airport 3 nautical miles (5.6 kilometres) southwest of Anderson, in Anderson County, South Carolina, United States. It is one of the busiest airports in upstate South Carolina. It receives over 14,000 visitors each year and generates over $13 million annually.

Anderson has no airline service or concourses for gates, and no control tower, but in 2007 one runway was extended 1,000 ft (300 m) to handle larger aircraft.

In May 2018, airport authorities announced plans for a 6.71 million dollar facelift. The plan includes further improvements of the main runway and building a new ADA-compliant general aviation terminal. Once the new terminal was completed, the old terminal built in 1970 was demolished.

From 2009 to 2020, the airport hosted an annual airshow that typically ran Saturday-Sunday and was free to the public. The Anderson Regional Airshow attracted an estimated 50,000 visitors to the airport each year during the two-day event.

Anderson Regional Airport covers 704 acres (2.85 km^{2}) and has two runways and two helipads:

- 5/23: 6,002 feet (1,829 m) by 150 feet (46 m), asphalt
- 17/35: 4,996 feet (1,523 m) by 150 feet (46 m), asphalt
- H1: 50 feet (15 m) by 50 feet (15 m), concrete
- H2: 50 feet (15 m) by 50 feet (15 m), concrete

New Prospect Elementary School is across from the airport; the school mascot is the Jets. It is the headquarters of the Anderson County Civil Air Patrol.

== History ==
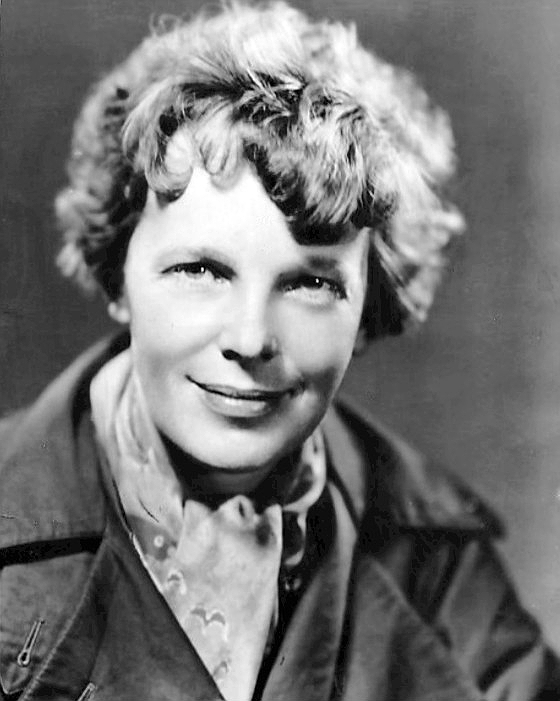
Amelia Earhart, 1935

Anderson County Airport, the first airport in the area, was founded in 1927. It was a grass field that was designated as an emergency landing field; eventually it was used to deliver air mail.

Famous aviator Amelia Earhart visited the airport on November 14, 1931; she was greeted by over 1,000 residents while she toured the town and met with local civic leaders. The visit was credited with creating enthusiasm for a better airport.

Within a year of her visit, civic leaders bought land 3 miles from downtown and plans were made for the new airport. Though Earhart was given credit for inspiring residents to build the new airport, she and her plane disappeared over the South Pacific two months before the airport opened in September 1937.

During World War II the airport was an auxiliary airfield for the United States Army Air Forces, supporting the combat flight training at Greenville Army Airbase. Control of the airport was returned to local authorities in the fall of 1945. The civilian pilot training for the Army Air Force was conducted at the Anderson Airport, and students from Clemson College participated in the flight training program.

In the 1950s Eastern Airlines scheduled three or four daily departures. The airport was one of Eastern's smallest stations and was a stop on a route between Atlanta and Charlotte. Famed World War I fighter ace and eventual CEO of Eastern Airlines, Eddie Rickenbacker, once made an unannounced stop. "Captain Eddie" inspected operations and visited briefly with employees; his visit that day was featured in Life magazine.

=== Historical airline service ===
Eastern Airlines served the airport from 1947 until 1964 as a stop on a route between Atlanta, GA and Greenville/Spartanburg, SC.

Southern Airways took over the former Eastern service from 1964 through 1974 flying the same route as Eastern.

Air Carolina offered service to Charlotte, Atlanta and Greenwood in the mid-1970s.

Bankair provided commuter airline service from 1978 until 1984 with flights to Columbia and Greenville/Spartanburg, SC

Sunbird Airlines began service in 1985 operating as Piedmont Commuter on behalf of Piedmont Airlines with flights to Charlotte, NC. In early 1986 Sunbird changed to CCAir and service ended in late 1986.

In 1989 Piedmont merged with USAir and from 1992 through 1993, CCAir returned to Anderson operating as USAir Express, again with commuter flights to Charlotte.

The airport has been served briefly by other commuter airlines and air taxi service, including ImagineAir in 2005.

== Accidents and incidents ==
- On June 16, 2012 1:30 p.m. an experimental airplane crashed in some trees near the airport runway. The pilot and sole passenger were not injured.
- On April 27, 2012 at 1:00 p.m. a Cirrus SR22 crashed on approach 600 yards of the runway, killing the pilot and injuring the passenger.
- On December 9, 2004 at 10:20 a.m. a Diamond DA40 en route to Anderson Regional was diverted due to poor visibility. The airport's instrument landing system, which helps pilots land in low visibility, was turned off due to an extension on the main runway. The plane crashed en route to a neighboring airport, killing all three on board.

== See also ==
- Georgia World War II Army Airfields
- List of airports in South Carolina
