= Rogue Valley International–Medford Airport =

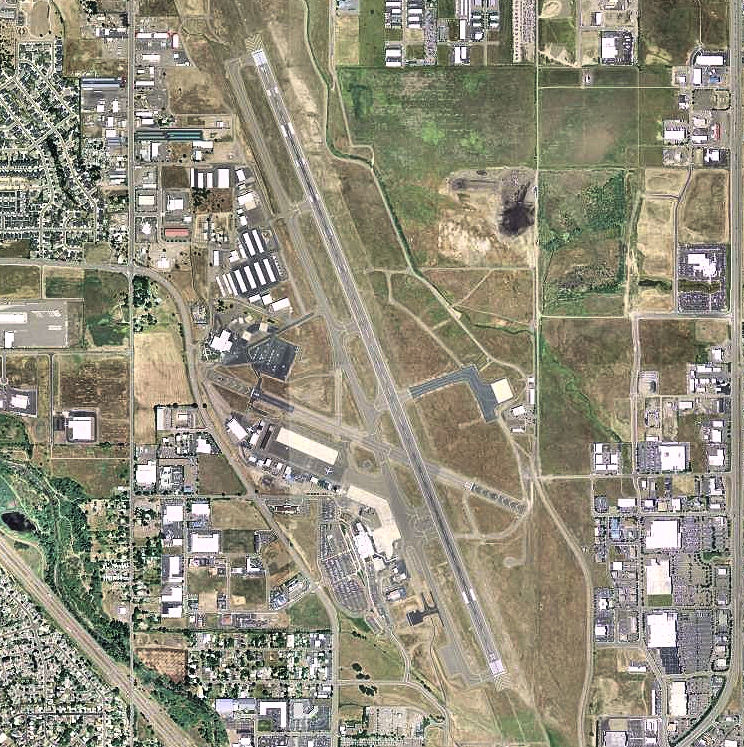
- USGS 2006 orthophoto
- IATA: MFR; ICAO: KMFR; FAA LID: MFR

Summary
- Airport type: Public
- Owner: Jackson County Airport Authority
- Serves: Rogue Valley
- Elevation AMSL: 1,335 ft (407 m)
- Coordinates: 42°22′27″N 122°52′25″W
- Website: flymfr.com

Map
- Interactive map of Rogue Valley International–Medford Airport

Runways
Direction	Length		Surface
Direction	ft	m	Surface
14/32	8,800	2,682	Asphalt

Statistics (2024)
- Aircraft operations (2024): 45,200
- Based aircraft (2024): 205
- Passengers (2025): 1,100,027
- Source: Federal Aviation Administration

FAA diagram

Rogue Valley International–Medford Airport (Note: Rogue Valley International–Medford Airport has no scheduled international flights; following the closure of the U.S. Customs office in 2003, the airport retained its international status in the hope that future economic growth would allow it to resume international service.) (IATA: MFR, ICAO: KMFR, FAA LID: MFR) is a public-use airport three miles north of downtown Medford, in Jackson County, Oregon, United States. Owned and operated by Jackson County's Aviation Authority, the airport serves southwest Oregon. Originally named Medford–Jackson County Airport, it was renamed to Rogue Valley International–Medford Airport after it became an international airport in 1994.

In December 2018, the airport celebrated its 1 million+ annual passenger milestone. In doing so Medford joined both PDX and EUG as the only Oregon airports to have surpassed 1 million passengers in a year. By virtue of annual commercial passengers, Rogue Valley International–Medford Airport (MFR) is the third busiest airport in Oregon, with 1,032,704 passenger enplanements and deplanements in 2024 (behind Eugene and Portland). The National Plan of Integrated Airport Systems for 2023–2027 categorized the Rogue Valley International–Medford Airport as a primary commercial service airport (more than 10,000 enplanements per year).

== Facilities ==
The airport covers 938 acres (380 ha) at an elevation of 1,335 feet (407 m). Its runway, 14/32, is 8,800 by 150 feet (2,682 x 46 m) asphalt.

The airport underwent renovations which included a new 110,000 sq ft (10,000 m^{2}) terminal building with room for expansion; work completed in 2009 and designed by CSHQA and the Abell Architectural Group Inc. The terminal has an observation deck on the second floor, a restaurant for screened and unscreened passengers, and second-story loading bridges. Now that the terminal is complete, there is a main concourse, and two open air concourses. A new control tower was completed in late 2008; the $3.6 million, 100-foot-tall (30 m) tower uses a state-of-the-art geothermal system to heat and cool the building.

Two fixed-base operators (FBOs) provide general aviation services on the field: Jet Center MFR, and Million Air Medford.

The Medford Air Tanker Base plays a key role in wildfire response across southern Oregon and northern California. Operated by the U.S. Forest Service, it serves as a launch point for single engine air tankers (SEATs), large air tankers (LATs) and very large air tankers (VLATs) during the busy summer fire season.

The Medford airport continues to post favorable passenger statistics; following steady year-over-year gains, the facility served 1,100,027 arriving and departing passengers in 2025, an all-time record — an increase from 1,032,704 passengers in 2024.

== Airline service present and past ==
Alaska Horizon, offers nonstops to Portland, Seattle/Tacoma, Los Angeles and San Diego. United Airlines and United Express offers nonstop flights to Denver and San Francisco. Delta Connection flies nonstop to Salt Lake City and Seattle. American Eagle flies nonstop to Phoenix. Allegiant Air flies nonstop to Las Vegas and Santa Ana. Most of the regional flights are operated by Skywest Airlines.

Medford has been served by several airlines throughout its history, including Hughes Airwest with Douglas DC-9s, Pacific Express with BAC One-Elevens, and PSA with BAe 146-200s. Other former operators include West Coast Airlines, Continental Airlines, USAir, US Airways Express, America West Express. which operated a variety of regional jets and turboprop aircraft.

More recently, Aha Airlines operated flights to Reno from October 2021 until August 2022, while Avelo Airlines provided nonstop service to Burbank until 2025.

== Airlines and destinations ==
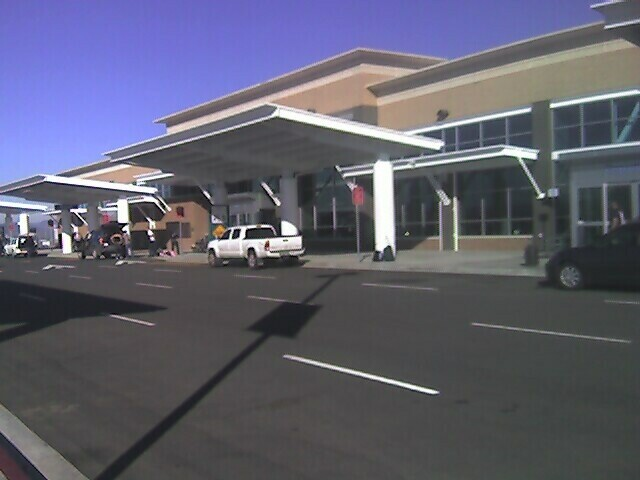
Rogue Valley International–Medford Airport terminal, c. 2009

=== Passenger ===
Airlines	Destinations
Alaska Airlines	Portland, San Diego, Seattle/Tacoma, Los Angeles
Allegiant Air	Las Vegas, Orange County
American Eagle	Phoenix–Sky Harbor
Delta Connection	Salt Lake City, Seattle/Tacoma
United Airlines	Denver, San Francisco
United Express	San Francisco; Seasonal: Denver

Destinations map
Destinations from Rogue Valley International Airport
Red = Year-round destination
Green = Seasonal destination
Blue = Future destination

=== Cargo ===
Airlines	Destinations
Ameriflight	Portland (OR)
FedEx Feeder operated by Empire Airlines	Portland (OR)

== Statistics ==
=== Top destinations ===
Top domestic routes out of MFR (August 2025 - July 2026)
Rank	City	Passengers	Carriers
1	Seattle/Tacoma, Washington	119,290	Alaska, Delta
2	Denver, Colorado	92,770	United
3	San Francisco, California	78,700	United
4	Portland, Oregon	70,590	Alaska
5	Phoenix–Sky Harbor, Arizona	43,150	American
6	Salt Lake City, Utah	42,620	Delta
7	Los Angeles, California	37,920	Alaska
8	San Diego, California	22,010	Alaska
9	Las Vegas, Nevada	17,680	Allegiant
10	Orange County, California	12,370	Allegiant

=== Airline market share ===
Largest airlines at MFR (August 2025 - July 2026)
Rank	Airline	Passengers	Share
1	SkyWest	418,000	38.74%
2	Horizon	315,000	29.20%
3	United	253,000	23.47%
4	Allegiant	61,580	5.71%
5	Envoy	25,980	2.41%
–	Other	5,230	0.48%

=== Annual traffic ===
MFR Airport annual passenger data, 2000–present
Year	Passengers	Year	Passengers	Year	Passengers
2000	492,065	2010	639,679	2020	509,624
2001	464,535	2011	618,195	2021	886,670
2002	462,098	2012	642,569	2022	1,031,693
2003	481,990	2013	631,234	2023	979,211
2004	532,194	2014	664,423	2024	1,032,704
2005	594,682	2015	757,971	2025	1,100,027
2006	597,965	2016	822,289	2026	
2007	647,471	2017	901,578	2027	
2008	604,690	2018	1,010,920	2028	
2009	594,532	2019	1,087,873	2029	
