= Logistic Air =

Airline of the United States

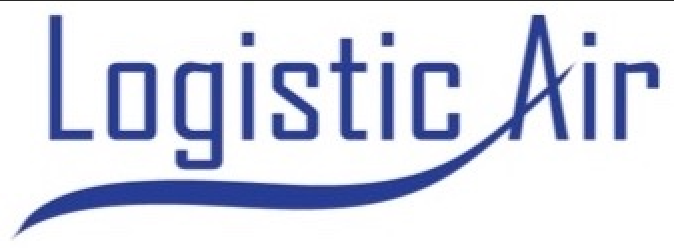
IATA	ICAO	Call sign
-	-	-
- Founded: 2018
- Parent company: Polaris 8
- Headquarters: Reno, NV
- Website: https://www.logisticair.com

Logistic Air is an airline that offers short and long-term aircraft leasing, including wet and dry leases.

In 2023, Logistic Air's parent company purchased then-defunct regional airline ExpressJet and planned to relaunch it as a charter airline using Logistic Air's aircraft.

== Fleet ==

Logistic Air's current fleet includes:

- Boeing 747 Passenger
- Boeing 747 Freighter
- Boeing 737-400
- Boeing 737-500
- Boeing 737-200QC
- Boeing 727-200 Freighter
- 1 Boeing 777-200ER (as of August 2025)
- McDonnell Douglas DC-10-30F
- McDonnell Douglas DC-9-32F
- McDonnell Douglas MD-82
