= Acey (name) =

Acey is both a surname and a given name. Notable people with the name include:

- Taalam Acey (born 1970), American poet
- Acey Slade (born 1974), American guitarist
