= ExpressJet =

Regional airline of the United States (1986–2022)

ExpressJet Airlines
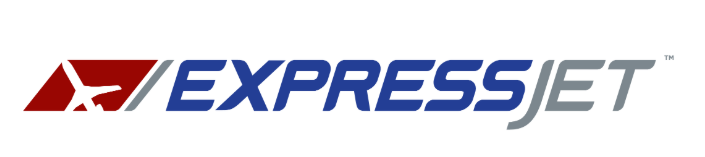
IATA	ICAO	Call sign
XE (1987–2011); EV (2011–2022)	BTA (1987–2011); ASQ (2011–2022)	JET LINK (1987–2011); ACEY (2011–2022)
- Founded: 1986 (amalgamation)
- Commenced operations: 1987
- Ceased operations: August 22, 2022
- AOC #: ASOA029B
- Subsidiaries: aha! (2021–2022)
- Fleet size: 5
- Parent company: Polaris 8
- Headquarters: College Park, Georgia, U.S.
- Key people: Subodh Karnik (Chairman & CEO)
- Website: web.archive.org/*/https://www.expressjet.com

ExpressJet Airlines was a regional airline in the United States that operated from 1987 until 2022. It was headquartered in College Park, Georgia.

== History ==
Express Jet began as Britt Airways and flew exclusively as Continental Express, the contracted codeshare partner for Continental Airlines. Its name was changed to ExpressJet at the beginning of 1995 when the company began acquiring regional jets, replacing its fleet of turboprop aircraft. Along with flying as Continental Express, ExpressJet expanded flying under the Delta Connection brand from 2007 through 2008 and again from 2012 through 2018. Service as American Eagle was flown between 2012 and 2019 and service under the United Express brand began in 2009. ExpressJet also flew an independent operation under their own brand in 2007 through 2008. When Continental Airlines merged into United Airlines in 2012, the Continental Express operations were added to the United Express service. In September 2020, it exited the fee-for-departure airline market and temporarily ceased flights after the conclusion of its contract with its sole remaining mainline partner, United Airlines. In September 2021, ExpressJet resumed operations as both an air charter provider and a regional airline under its own brand aha!—short for "Air-Hotel-Adventure." The brand's route structure focused on the West Coast of the United States with a hub at Reno-Tahoe International Airport, and scheduled flights began on October 24, 2021.

The airline, including its brand aha!, filed for bankruptcy on August 23, 2022, having ceased all operations the previous day. In July 2023, the airline announced plans to relaunch as an air charter service using a single leased Boeing 777.

=== Incorporation and acquisition ===
The airline was established in 1986 and started operations in 1987. Its origins were in a group of small commuter airlines acquired by Texas Air Corporation / Continental Airlines. These included Bar Harbor Airlines in Maine, Provincetown-Boston Airlines in New England, Rocky Mountain Airways in Denver, Colorado, and Britt Airways in Terre Haute, Indiana. ExpressJet operated under the original Federal Aviation Administration Part 121 certificate issued to Britt, which began operations as Continental Express in April 1987 and was later acquired by Continental Airlines. ExpressJet Airlines, Inc. incorporated in 1995.

=== Corporate independence ===
ExpressJet was spun off from Continental in 2002. Afterwards the company began plans to move into a corporate headquarters location, boasting over 8,000 employees. ExpressJet Holdings also owned American Composites LLC, Saltillo Jet Center, and InTech Aerospace Services. Together with other facilities throughout the U.S. they made up ExpressJet Services which provided third-party maintenance, repair and overhaul services for a variety of aircraft types. ExpressJet Holdings also had non-controlling interests in Wings Holdings LLC 49% and Flight Services and Systems Inc 44%.

Before ExpressJet became independent, it was headquartered in Continental Center I in Downtown Houston.

Following a December 2005 decision by Continental to reduce ExpressJet's Continental Express flying by 69 aircraft, the airline elected to operate the aircraft independently. On December 31, 2006, the airline began its charter operation. It operated 6 aircraft for charter services under the Corporate Aviation Division.

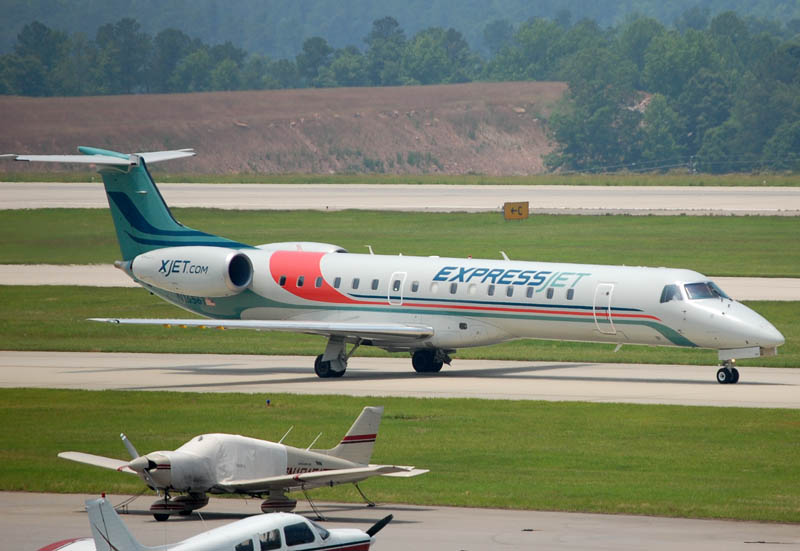
Embraer ERJ 145 regional jet in ExpressJet livery serving Raleigh-Durham International Airport in May 2008

On February 5, 2007, the airline announced service to 24 cities in the west coast, southwest, and midwest regions of the United States beginning in April 2007.

On April 2, 2007, the airline began point-to-point services under its own name to locations throughout the U.S. The airline had a total of 42 aircraft in their branded operation. According to ExpressJet CEO James Ream, LA/Ontario International Airport in Ontario, California (alternate airport to nearby LAX) would become the airline's "biggest center of operation". In addition to Ontario in the west, New Orleans operated as a hub with additional focus cities and 24 destinations. A route map published by ExpressJet in the summer of 2007 depicted a U.S. route system stretching from Raleigh/Durham, North Carolina and Jacksonville, Florida in the east to a number of cities in California in the west and also as far north as Omaha, Boise and Spokane. During this period oil prices escalated from $50 per barrel to $140 which made conditions unsustainable for the branded operation. The service ended on September 2, 2008.

=== 2007 and 2010 partnerships ===
In March 2007, ExpressJet operated four of its Embraer ERJ 145 jets on JetBlue routes while JetBlue's Embraer 190 jets were being serviced.

In June 2007, the airline began service at LAX to western ski markets and Mexico on behalf of Delta Air Lines under the Delta Connection banner using 10 ERJ 145 aircraft. In July 2007, the agreement was increased to 18 aircraft. In July 2008, the agreement was terminated and ExpressJet ended all Delta Connection flying by September 1.

Shortly after announcing the end of its agreement with Delta, ExpressJet announced on July 8, 2008, that it would also end its independent ExpressJet-branded flying on September 2 due to the oil price increases since 2003. This resulted in the furlough of 347 pilots.

In September 2007, the airline agreed to provide feeder service for Frontier Airlines from Denver International Airport while federal certification for Frontier's Lynx Aviation turboprop subsidiary was underway. ExpressJet flew to 5 cities from Frontier's Denver hub using 50-seat ERJ 145 regional jets until Frontier's subsidiary, Lynx Aviation, received DOT approval in December 2007. As of December 7, ExpressJet discontinued providing feeder service for Frontier Airlines.

In April 2008, SkyWest, Inc. proposed an acquisition of ExpressJet at a price of $23.50/share. ExpressJet Holdings Inc. said its special committee unanimously rejected the proposal. SkyWest rescinded the offer in early June after ExpressJet Holdings and Continental signed a new 7-year Capacity Purchase Agreement. This proposal was ultimately not successful.

In May 2010, ExpressJet began operating Branson Air Express, non-stop air service between Branson, Missouri and Houston, Texas; Austin, Texas; Nashville, Tennessee; Des Moines, Iowa; Shreveport, Louisiana and Terre Haute, Indiana; Chicago Midway and Indianapolis. ExpressJet's last flight operating under Branson Air Express was on October 30, 2010.

=== Growth as United Express ===
ExpressJet began a temporary contract with United Airlines to fly as a United Express carrier beginning in June 2009. The contract was for approximately 10 aircraft that operated out of United's O'Hare and Washington (Dulles) hub. The aircraft were flown in ExpressJet livery. The contract ended on September 2, 2009.

In late 2010, ExpressJet signed a multiple year contract with United Airlines for 22 ERJ 145 aircraft. The aircraft were flown, for the first time, in full United Express colors. Additionally, 10 more ERJ 145s, in ExpressJet colors, operated for United during the peak Summer travel season in 2010. The first flights under this new contract started December 1, 2009, and all 22 aircraft were in United Express service by Spring 2010.

=== Consolidation with Atlantic Southeast Airlines ===
On November 12, 2010, the airline was purchased by SkyWest, Inc. (the parent company of SkyWest Airlines, the largest regional airline in the United States) and merged with Atlantic Southeast Airlines. As a legal entity, the original (legacy) ExpressJet airlines effectively ceased to exist. Atlantic Southeast Airlines continued to operate ExpressJet during that time under the terms of their then current operating certificate with the FAA as "ExpressJet Airlines" while a new name for the recently merged companies was being considered.

In October 2011, the employees of ExpressJet and Atlantic Southeast Airlines voted to keep the name ExpressJet as the combined airlines new name, while Atlantic Southeast's "Acey" callsign would remain. (Prior to the merger, the original ExpressJet had used its own IATA code “XE”, ICAO code “BTA”, and callsign “JET LINK”.) ASA had been a Delta Connection feeder carrier prior which reinstated ExpressJet as Delta Connection in 2012.

On November 15, 2012, ExpressJet added feeder operations for American Airlines under the American Eagle brand.

In October 2013, ExpressJet opened a new crew domicile in Kansas City, Missouri, at Kansas City International Airport. ExpressJet also opened a crew domicile in Denver, at Denver International Airport.

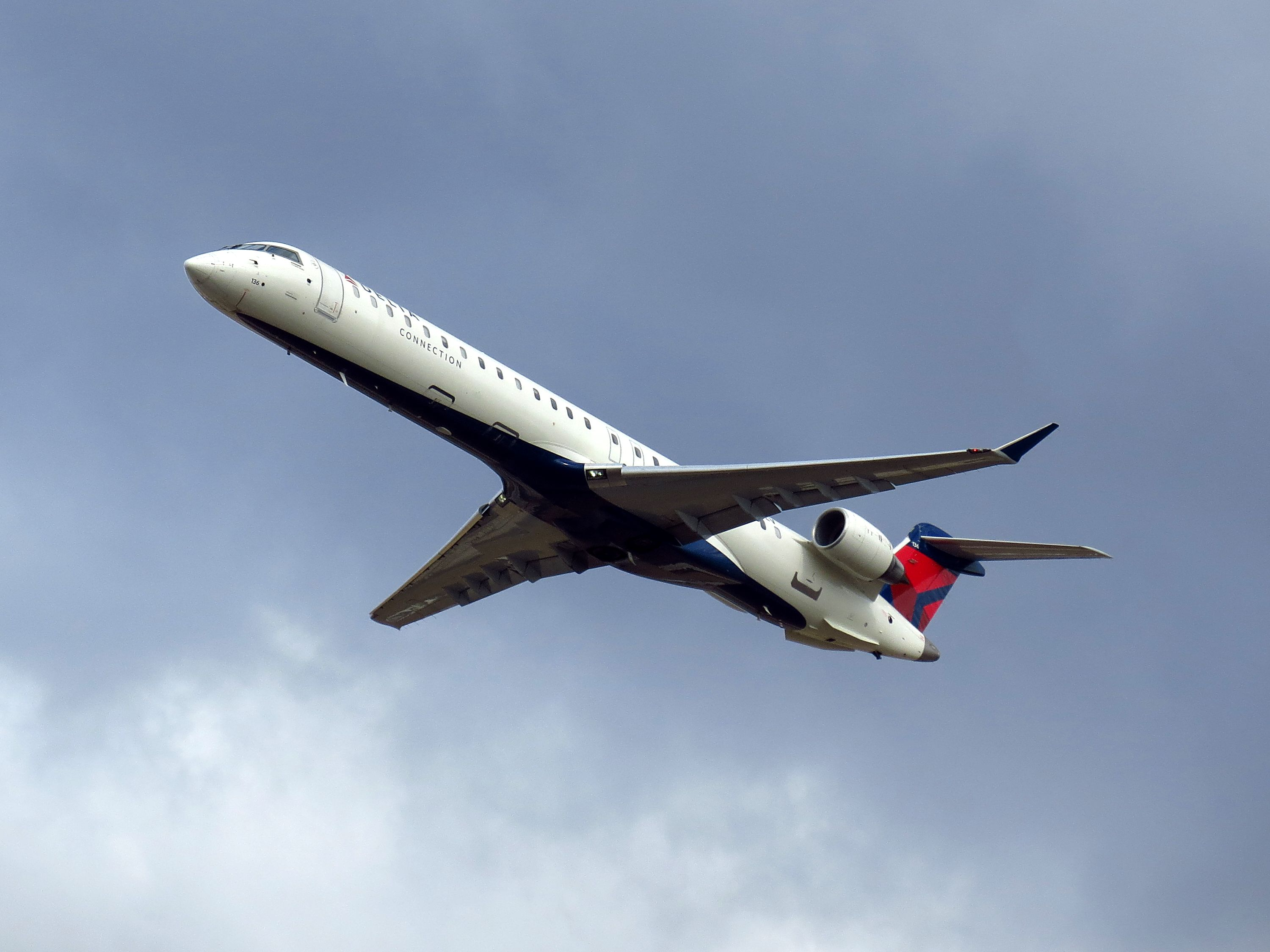
ExpressJet CRJ900 operating as Delta Connection at Hartsfield–Jackson Atlanta International Airport in December 2012

=== 2018 acquisition ===
As talks with United Airlines of a potential purchase gained momentum in August 2017, Delta Air Lines terminated its contract with ExpressJet. The fleet of CRJ900 aircraft it operated (but were owned by Delta) were transferred to Endeavor Air. American Airlines terminated their contract with ExpressJet in May 2018, marking ExpressJet's permanent exit from American Eagle-branded flights as of January 5, 2019.

In late 2018, it was announced that the company would be spun-off by SkyWest and purchased by a joint venture called ManaAir, with KAir Enterprises as the majority (50.1%) owner and United Airlines as the minority (49.9%) owner.

January 2019 ExpressJet Airlines announced finalization of its acquisition by Mana Air, LLC along with United Airlines as a minority investor. In addition, United committed delivery of 25 new Embraer 175 aircraft to ExpressJet for United Express operations beginning in April 2019.

February 2020 United Airlines announced a formal reassignment of 36 ERJ-145 jets from another United Express carrier to ExpressJet. This made ExpressJet the largest operator of ERJ-145 aircraft in the world.

==== AVIATE program ====
United Airlines and ExpressJet had partnered to offer ExpressJet pilots a direct path to a First Officer position at United Airlines through the United Pilot Career Path Program called "AVIATE". The program guaranteed eligible ExpressJet pilots participation in United's hiring process and, once accepted into the program, the expectation that they would become a mainline United Airlines pilot. Through the program, United had committed to hiring a sizable portion of its new-hire pilots directly from ExpressJet.

=== COVID-19 pandemic disruption ===
Due to the impact of the COVID-19 pandemic on aviation, on July 30, 2020, it was announced that United Airlines decided to end its contract with ExpressJet and transfer these operations to fellow United Express affiliate CommutAir. CommutAir would become the sole operator of the United Express ERJ 145 fleet.

On August 24, 2020, it was announced ExpressJet would end United Express operations on September 30, 2020. As part of the operational wind down ExpressJet had closed maintenance bases at Chicago O'Hare and Cleveland Hopkins International airports. Despite the lack of flying since the end of March 2020, the crew base in Newark never officially closed before systemwide operations ended. Likewise, the flight crew base in Chicago remained open until shutdown as the final revenue flight to O'Hare (Flight 3915 from Fargo) by ExpressJet was completed on September 2.

On September 30, 2020, at 11:44 AM, ExpressJet Airlines flight 4001 departed out of gate former Continental Express Gate C14A at Memphis International Airport, 6 minutes ahead of schedule utilizing the former "Jetlink" call-sign. A local grass-roots effort led by United CSA David Knowles and Lead Ramp Serviceman Johnny Dortch at MEM arranged for a surprise water-cannon salute to honor the working crew, along with the several former/current ExpressJet employees on board as passengers and in the terminal looking outwards prior to its takeoff 11 minutes later. Jetlink 4001 then touched down at George Bush Intercontinental Airport in Houston at 1:24 PM, parking 8 minutes later after a low altitude fly-over and additional water-cannon salute at Gate B87. The final flight was piloted by former Houston Chief Pilot James Campbell and former Houston Assistant Chief Pilot, Sean George with Teresa Baltazar-Arambula serving as the Flight Attendant. This flight was not only the last revenue ExpressJet departure, but also the last ExpressJet revenue arrival subsequently concluding all ExpressJet Airlines operations for United, sans any media attention. Federal assistance was in place for US airline industry workers, however, due to the circumstances of shutting down ExpressJet, some 3000 employees lost their jobs at the airline with no federal assistance.

=== Resumption and launch of aha! brand ===
In July 2021, the US Department of Transportation (DOT) granted final approval for ExpressJet to restart commercial operations. The airline's first relaunched revenue flight was a sports charter operated on September 30, 2021, between Tallahassee, FL and Anderson, SC—exactly one year after its final flight as a fee-for-departure contract carrier. One day later, the company also launched aha!, a leisure travel brand providing scheduled air service between Reno-Tahoe International Airport and cities along the West Coast of the United States. Scheduled flights began on October 24, 2021, with the first flight being to Pasco, Washington. The carrier focused on cities, markets, and customers which have seen diminished air service as a result of airline industry consolidation and "up-gauging" of routes to larger but less-frequent flights.

On June 14, 2022, United Airlines Holdings Inc. quietly divested its stake in the parent company of former regional carrier ExpressJet Airlines. ExpressJet Airlines LLC became 100% owned by KAir Enterprises and affiliates.

ExpressJet filed for Chapter 11 bankruptcy on August 22, 2022. Although Chapter 11 is typically used as protection while a debtor restructures, ExpressJet ceased all flight operations with plans to liquidate its assets.

=== Proposed 2023 relaunch ===
In early 2023, ExpressJet's assets were purchased by the company that owns Logistic Air, a Nevada-based lessor and aviation solutions provider, and Global Supertanker Aviation, LLC.

In July 2023, the carrier announced its intentions to restart operations with a single Boeing 777. The airline requested a 90 day extension to its Air Operator Certificate's revocation-for-dormancy date while it works to submit its formal intent to resume operations.

The aircraft ExpressJet plans to use is a former Japan Airlines aircraft owned by Logistic Air. The airline estimates it will take nearly $2 million to finalize its relaunch.

In November 2023, the company requested to have its operating certificate changed from Part 121 domestic to Part 121 supplemental authority. Though the new air operator's certificate was expected to be approved by mid 2024, it failed to provide updates by the end of that year, and its operating certificate was revoked.

== Fleet ==
=== Fleet at time of closure ===
As of June 2022, prior to the closure of all operations, the ExpressJet fleet consisted of the following aircraft:

Aircraft	In service	Passengers	Operated for
Embraer ERJ 145	5	50	aha!
Total	5		

=== Historic fleet ===
ExpressJet previously operated Bombardier CRJ200, CRJ700, CRJ900, Embraer ERJ 145, and Embraer 175 aircraft for American Eagle, United Express and Delta Connection.

== Corporate headquarters ==
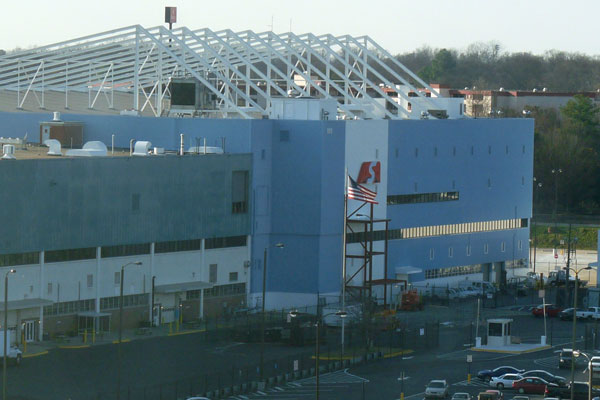
Former Atlantic Southeast Airlines headquarters at A-Tech Center at Hartsfield-Jackson Atlanta International Airport

ExpressJet has its headquarters in College Park, Georgia, in Greater Atlanta.

ExpressJet previously had its headquarters in the North Belt Office Center IV, a building in the Greens Crossing office park, a 484-acre (1.96 km^{2}) mixed-use office park; the office park is in the Greenspoint area of Houston.

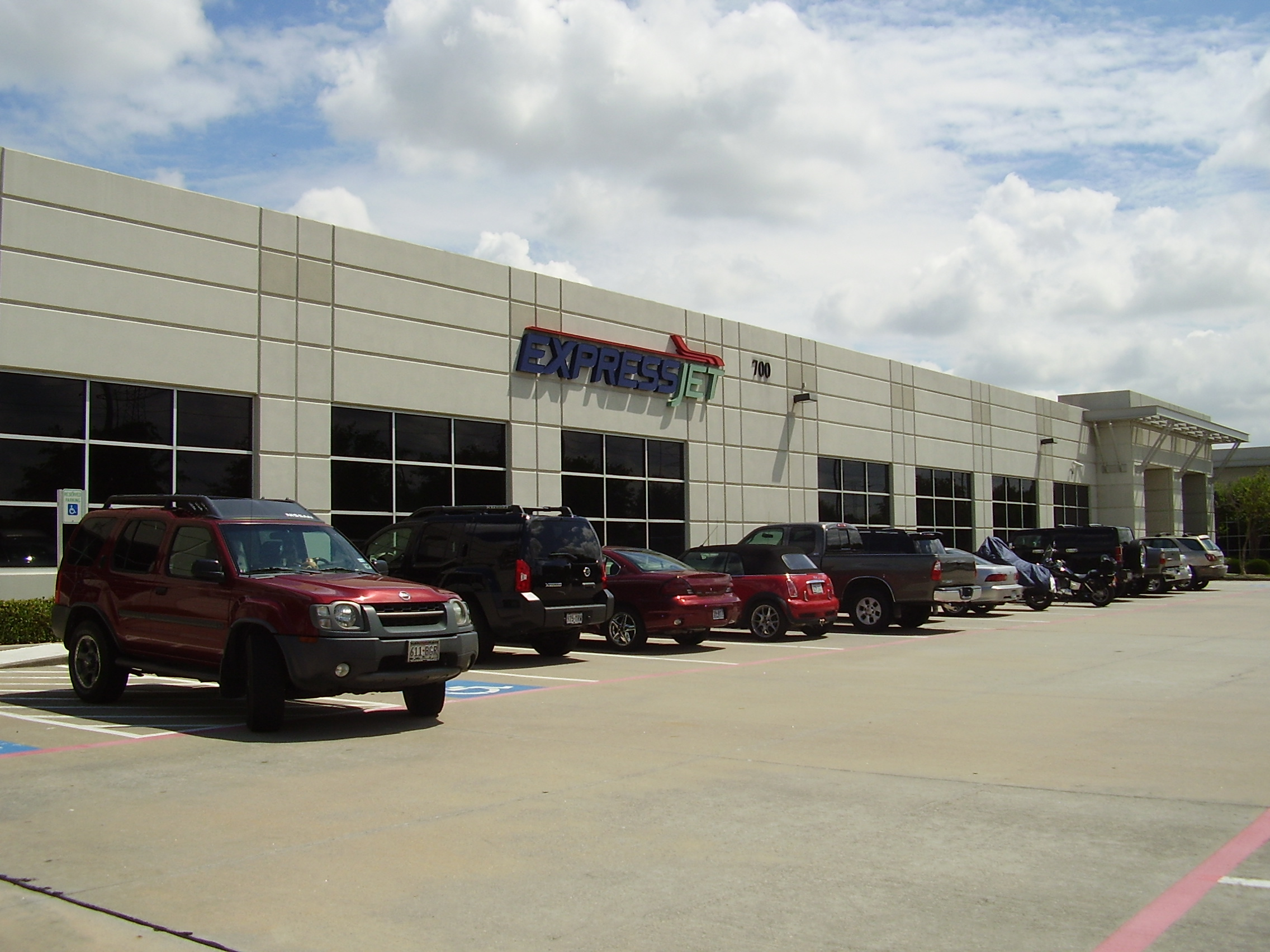
Former ExpressJet headquarters in Greenspoint, Houston

ExpressJet was one of three tenants that leased space in the two-building, 107,200-square-foot (9,960 m^{2}) North Belt Office Center complex, which includes buildings III and IV. FORT Properties manages both buildings. ExpressJet uses the location due to the proximity to George Bush Intercontinental Airport and to Continental Center I, the Continental Airlines headquarters in Downtown Houston. ExpressJet had relocated its headquarters to its final Houston location by 2006. FORT had acquired the buildings in 2007, which were built in 2003.

== Accidents and incidents ==
- On August 8, 2009, an ExpressJet aircraft operating as Continental Express Flight 2816 was involved in a passenger-handling incident that resulted in the 6-hour-long forced enplanement of its crew and 47 passengers. The flight was originally destined for Minneapolis–Saint Paul International Airport, but weather forced its diversion to Rochester International Airport—a facility not served by ExpressJet nor Continental. Upon landing at 12:28 am, representatives of Mesaba Airlines—which did possess passenger-handling capability in Rochester—refused to allow the passengers to deplane and enter the airport terminal. The event resulted in United States Department of Transportation (DOT) fines against all the involved airlines, and it contributed to new regulations codifying the rights of airline passengers.
- On April 3, 2012, an ExpressJet Embraer ERJ 145, registration N15973, operating as Flight 5912 from Peoria, IL to Denver was landing on 34R in Denver when the aircraft hit approach lights and stopped on the runway. Smoke developed inside the aircraft and passengers were evacuated onto the runway. One passenger was taken to hospital for treatment of his injuries.
- On May 1, 2013, the wing of Scandinavian Airlines Flight 908, an Airbus A330 bound for Oslo, Norway, clipped the tail of ExpressJet Flight 4226, destined for Nashville, Tennessee, during departure taxi to runway 22R at Newark Liberty Airport. No injuries were reported.
