= SkyWest, Inc. =

Airline holding company

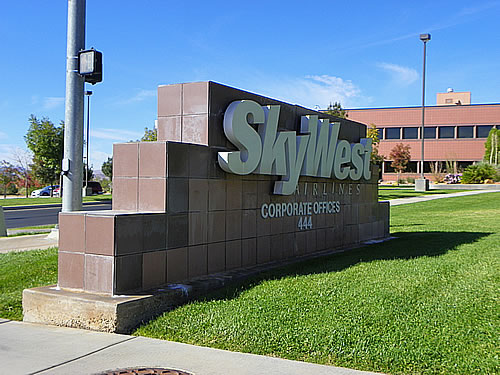
- SkyWest Inc.'s headquarters in St. George, Utah
- Company type: Public
- Traded as: Nasdaq: SKYW; S&P 600 component
- Industry: Aviation
- Founded: September 8, 2005; 20 years ago
- Headquarters: St. George, Utah, U.S.
- Key people: Chip Childs (CEO and president); James Welch (chair)
- Revenue: ▲US$4.1 billion (2025)
- Operating income: ▲US$618 million (2025)
- Net income: ▲US$428 million (2025)
- Total assets: ▲US$7.4 billion (2025)
- Total equity: ▲US$2.8 billion (2025)
- Number of employees: ▲15,775 (2025)
- Subsidiaries: Contour Airlines (25%); SkyWest Airlines; SkyWest Charter; SkyWest Leasing
- Website: inc.skywest.com
- Footnotes / references Financials as of December 31, 2025. References

SkyWest, Inc. is the holding company for SkyWest Airlines, a North American regional airline, as well as an aircraft leasing company. It is headquartered in St. George, Utah, United States.

== History ==
SkyWest, Inc. was established on September 8, 2005 as the holding company of SkyWest Airlines and Atlantic Southeast Airlines (ASA). The leadership of SkyWest Airlines had agreed to purchase ASA from Delta Air Lines amidst Delta's bankruptcy proceedings for US$425 million. The bankruptcy judge approved the all-cash transaction, which helped Delta improve its liquidity; the deal closed on September 8, 2005, the day the holding company was established. SkyWest Airlines and ASA never merged and both airlines maintained separate operations at their respective hubs.

On August 4, 2010, SkyWest, Inc. announced that it would acquire ExpressJet Airlines for US$133 million and merge it into ASA. The combined airline would operate primarily on the East Coast, the South and Midwest, compared to SkyWest Airlines, which would continue to operate primarily on the West Coast. The deal closed on November 12, 2010; ASA and ExpressJet integrated their operations and were granted a single operating certificate on December 31, 2011. The combined airline took the ExpressJet name.

On December 18, 2018, SkyWest, Inc. announced that it would sell ExpressJet to ManaAir, LLC, another airline holding company with ties to United Airlines, ExpressJet's sole client. The US$70 million deal closed on January 23, 2019. The deal made SkyWest Airlines the only subsidiary of SkyWest, Inc.

In early 2024, SkyWest, Inc. purchased a 25% ownership stake of Contour Airlines to gain access to its infrastructure, personnel, and operational expertise as it launches its own Part 135 public charter operation, SkyWest Charter. SkyWest also plans to supply Contour with CRJ200 aircraft and partner with the airline to both recruit young pilots and provide opportunities to pilots who would otherwise need to retire due to age.
