= Southeastern Airlines =

IATA	ICAO	Call sign
-	-	-
- Commenced operations: 1982
- Ceased operations: 1983
- Hubs: Hartsfield-Jackson Atlanta International Airport
- Key people: Michael J. Brady

Southeastern Airlines was a regional airline that was acquired by Atlantic Southeast Airlines, a Delta Connection carrier, on April 1, 1983. It was formed in 1982 by Atlanta entrepreneur Michael J. Brady, who had formerly been head of Eastern Metro Express, a feeder for Eastern Airlines.

== History ==
The airline was originally known as Southeastern Commuter Airlines, but the "Commuter" part was dropped at some point before the merge with ASA. Southeastern served many cities in the southeast, mostly in the state of Georgia, using Atlanta as a hub.
