= Aha! (airline brand) =

Domestic U.S. airline brand (2021–2022)

aha!
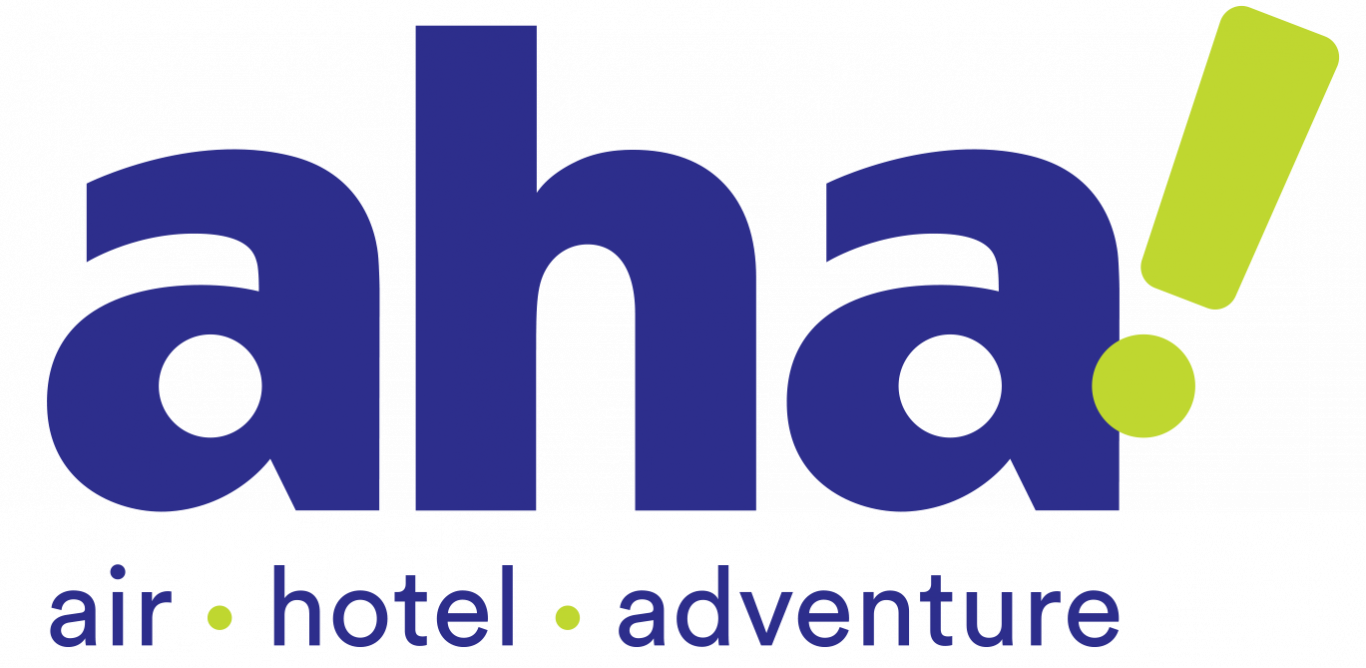
IATA	ICAO	Call sign
EV	ASQ	ACEY
- Commenced operations: October 24, 2021; 4 years ago
- Ceased operations: August 22, 2022; 3 years ago
- AOC #: ASOA029B
- Operating bases: Reno–Tahoe International Airport
- Fleet size: 5
- Destinations: 12
- Parent company: ExpressJet
- Key people: Subodh Karnik (Chairman & CEO)
- Website: www.flyaha.com

Aha! (legally Aha! Travel Management Company LLC, stylized aha!) was the brand name used by regional airline ExpressJet for flights between Reno–Tahoe International Airport and cities along the West Coast of the United States.

== Overview ==
The brand name stands for "air-hotel-adventure" in reference to the company's plans to partner with resorts, casinos, and attractions in Reno and Tahoe to “bundle” value-priced vacation packages. The company initially planned to serve each community three times per week with 50-seat Embraer ERJ 145 regional jets. Regular scheduled service began on October 24, 2021, from Reno to Pasco, Washington.

Aha!, together with its parent company ExpressJet, filed for Chapter 11 bankruptcy on August 22, 2022. Although Chapter 11 is typically used as protection while a debtor restructures, ExpressJet ceased all flight operations with plans to liquidate its assets.

== Destinations ==
Aha! operated from Reno–Tahoe International Airport to thirteen smaller cities along the West Coast of the United States and had planned to expand to up to 20 destinations:

State	City	Airport	Notes	Refs
California	Bakersfield	Meadows Field Airport	Terminated	
California	Eureka	Arcata–Eureka Airport	Terminated	
California	Fresno	Fresno Yosemite International Airport		
California	Ontario	Ontario International Airport		
California	Palm Springs	Palm Springs International Airport		
California	Santa Rosa	Charles M. Schulz–Sonoma County Airport		
Idaho	Boise	Boise Airport		
Idaho	Idaho Falls	Idaho Falls Regional Airport		
Nevada	Reno	Reno–Tahoe International Airport	Operating base	
Oregon	Eugene	Eugene Airport		
Oregon	Medford	Rogue Valley International–Medford Airport		
Oregon	Redmond	Redmond Municipal Airport		
Washington	Pasco	Tri-Cities Airport		
Washington	Spokane	Spokane International Airport		

== Fleet ==
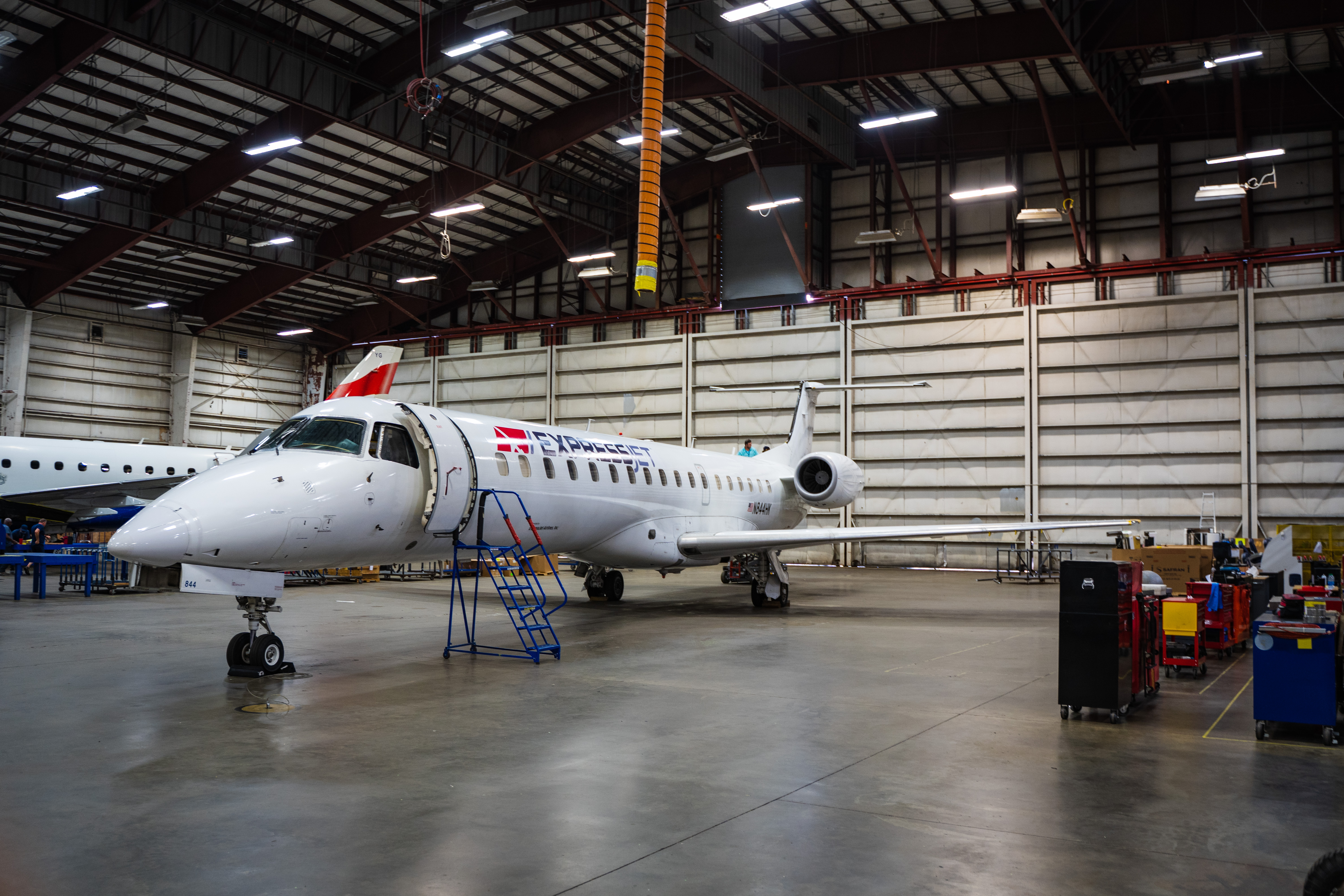
ExpressJet Embraer ERJ 145, which had been operated under the aha! brand.

The aha! fleet included the following aircraft during its existence:

Aircraft	In service	Passengers	Notes
Embraer ERJ 145	5	50	Operated by ExpressJet
Total	5		
