= Sunbird Airlines =

American airline

Sunbird Airlines was a United States airline founded by Ralph Quinlan in Denver, North Carolina on November 15, 1979 (46 years ago).

Operating the Cessna 402, and later the Cessna 404 aircraft, the company shared equipment, operations, maintenance and facilities with parent company Mountain Air Cargo founded by Ralph Quinlan. In 1983, Sunbird acquired the Beechcraft C99 turboprop aircraft, and was the launch customer for the -C model (larger baggage pod, etc.). Also in 1983, Mountain Air acquired Atlanta Express, and merged this operation with that of Sunbird.

Sunbird was only marginally successful those initial years, managing only because of the shared facilities of the parent. Through the various cycles of the parent company, the decision was made in late 1983 to divest the Sunbird operation to Roy Hagerty. Mr Hagerty had financing, and previous airline experience, he being one of the creators of Southeastern Airlines. That company later was absorbed into the company now known as Atlantic Southeast Airlines. On the completion of the Sunbird purchase, Hagerty moved the entire Sunbird operation to the Charlotte/Douglas International Airport in Charlotte, NC.

Under the period of Hagerty ownership, the company was known as Sunbird Airlines 1984, Inc. With the Hagerty leadership, a program of aggressive growth began. New cities were added, and the acquisition of Short 330 aircraft began. In 1985, a code-sharing agreement was reached with Piedmont Airlines for Sunbird to begin operations as Piedmont Commuter at the Charlotte Piedmont hub on or about May 1, 1985. At this time, the "Sunbird" radio callsign was lost to history, and the Sunbird/Piedmont Commuter flights were under the "Carolina" call. On or about February 15, 1986 (40 years ago), the company was renamed CCAir.

== Destinations ==
- Asheville, North Carolina
- Athens, Georgia
- Atlanta, Georgia
- Charlotte, North Carolina
- Columbia, South Carolina
- Durham, North Carolina
- Fayetteville, North Carolina
- Florence, South Carolina
- Greenville, North Carolina
- Hickory, North Carolina
- Hilton Head Island, South Carolina
- Jacksonville, Florida
- Kinston, North Carolina
- Norfolk, Virginia
- Raleigh, North Carolina
- Richmond, Virginia
- Roanoke Rapids, North Carolina
- Rocky Mount, North Carolina
- Tri-Cities, Tennessee
- Wilson, North Carolina
- Winston-Salem, North Carolina

== Fleet ==
- 10x Beechcraft C99
- 3x BAe Jetstream 31
- 1x Short SD-330

== See also ==
- List of defunct airlines of the United States
