= SkyWest Airlines =

Regional airline of the United States

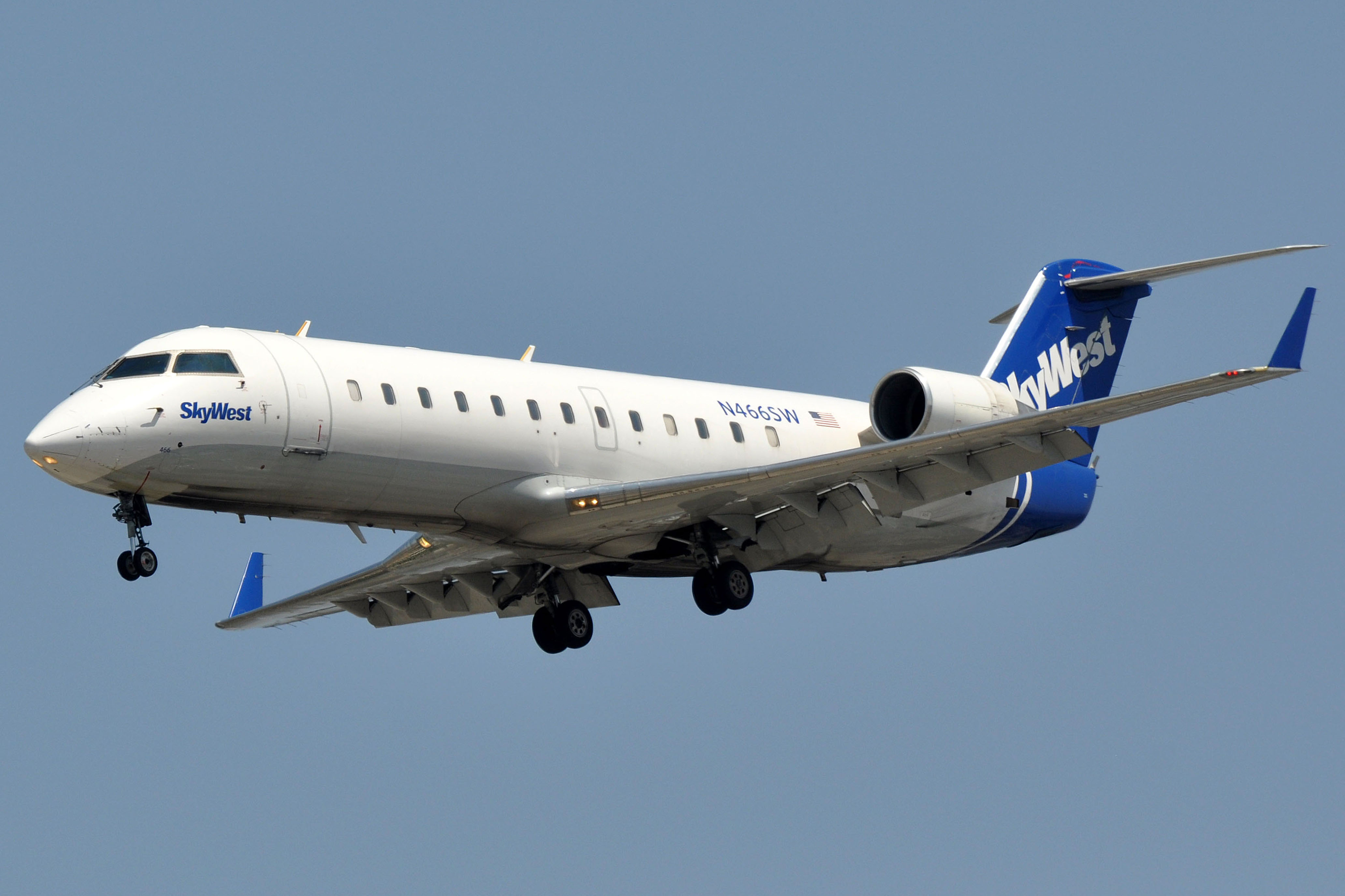
- Bombardier CRJ200
IATA	ICAO	Call sign
OO	SKW	SKYWEST
- Founded: April 26, 1972; 54 years ago
- AOC #: SWIA011A
- Hubs: See § Network
- Fleet size: 498
- Destinations: 256
- Parent company: SkyWest, Inc.
- Headquarters: St. George, Utah, U.S.
- Key people: Chip Childs (CEO); Wade Steele (President & COO); James Welch (Chair)
- Employees: 14,610 (2024)
- Website: skywest.com

SkyWest Airlines is an American regional airline headquartered in St. George, Utah. SkyWest operates and maintains aircraft used on flights that are scheduled, marketed, and sold by four partner mainline airlines. The company is contracted by Alaska Airlines (as Alaska SkyWest), American Airlines (as American Eagle), Delta Air Lines (as Delta Connection), and United Airlines (as United Express). In all, it is the largest regional airline in North America when measured by fleet size, number of passengers carried, and number of destinations served — and one of the largest airlines worldwide in terms of fleet size.

SkyWest operates from 256 cities in the United States, Canada and Mexico with an extensive network of routes largely set up to connect passengers between smaller airports and the large hubs of its partner airlines. In total, SkyWest carried 46 million passengers in 2025.

On an average day in 2025, the company operated 2,260 flights, of which 940 (42%) were United Express flights, 680 (30%) were Delta Connection flights, 420 (19%) were American Eagle flights, and 210 (9%) were Alaska Airlines flights.

== History ==
Frustrated by the limited extent of existing air service, Ralph Atkin, a St. George, Utah, lawyer, purchased Dixie Airlines on April 26, 1972, to shuttle businessmen to Salt Lake City. After early struggles, SkyWest began a steady expansion across the western U.S. It became the eleventh largest regional carrier in 1984 when it acquired Sun Aire Lines of Palm Springs, California, and had its initial public offering in 1986.

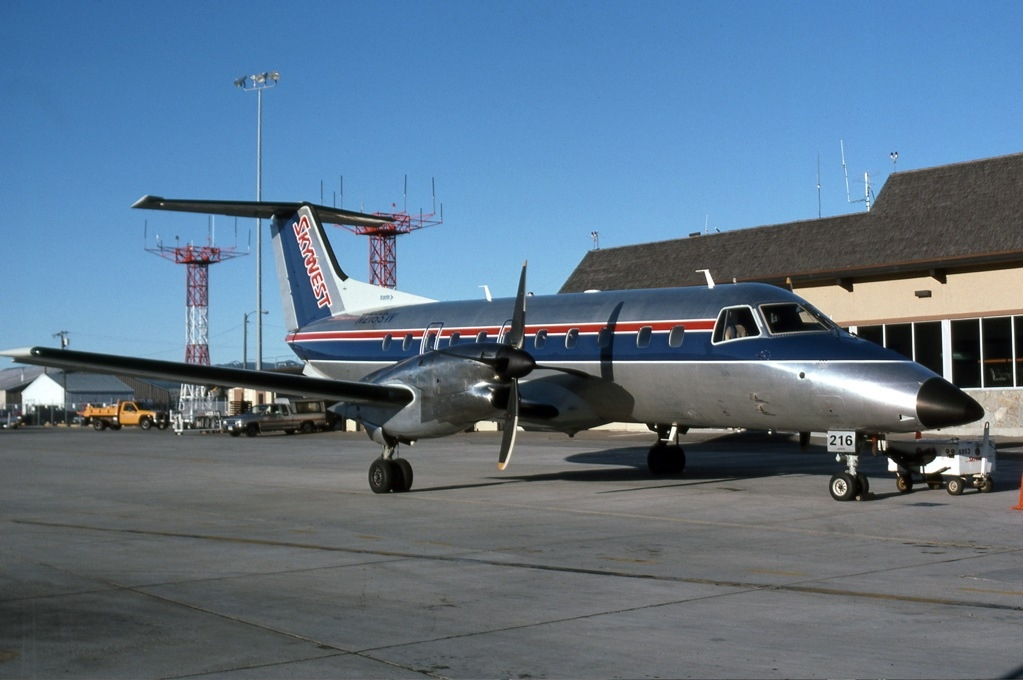
Embraer EMB-120ER "Brasilia"

In early 1986, SkyWest began codesharing as Western Express, a feeder service for Western Airlines at its Salt Lake City hub and other mainline Western destinations utilizing Embraer EMB 120 and Fairchild Metroliner turboprop aircraft. Following the acquisition and merger of Western by Delta Air Lines in 1987, SkyWest then became a Delta Connection air carrier with codeshare service being flown on behalf of Delta to destinations in Arizona, California, Colorado, Montana, Nevada, Utah and Wyoming.

From 1995 through 1997, SkyWest operated codeshare service for Continental Airlines as Continental Connection on flights out of Los Angeles that were also operated as Delta Connection.

In 1997, SkyWest began operating as United Express in addition to Delta Connection on flights out of United Airlines hubs at SFO, LAX and DEN. SkyWest became United's largest United Express operation by the late 1990s. Flights were initially operated with Embraer EMB 120s and Bombardier CRJ200 regional jets. CRJ700s were added in the early 2000s and the Embraer 175 were added in 2014.

A partnership with Continental was revived in 2003 as Continental Connection out of George Bush Intercontinental Airport in Houston but was discontinued in June 2005. This operation used Embraer EMB 120s.

On August 15, 2005, Delta sold Atlantic Southeast Airlines to the newly incorporated SkyWest, Inc., for $425 million in cash. The acquisition was completed on September 8, 2005.

In 2007, SkyWest began code sharing with Midwest Airlines at its hubs in Milwaukee and Kansas City using Bombardier CRJ200 aircraft. In 2010 the codeshare with Midwest had ended, and a new codeshare agreement began with AirTran Airways at Milwaukee. On September 6, 2011, AirTran Airways ended its codesharing and partnership with SkyWest. Shortly after, SkyWest began a codesharing agreement with US Airways to operate CRJ200 aircraft from US Airways' hub in Phoenix, Arizona.

On August 4, 2010, SkyWest, Inc., announced that it planned to acquire ExpressJet and merge it with SkyWest subsidiary Atlantic Southeast Airlines in a deal reported to have a value of $133 million. The purchase aligned the largest commuter operations of United Airlines and Continental Airlines, who were in a merger process, and was approved on September 13, 2010, by the Federal Trade Commission.

In May 2011, SkyWest replaced Horizon Air on six routes on the West Coast being operated for Alaska Airlines. The flights were based out of Seattle and Portland and flew to several California cities, including Fresno, Burbank, Santa Barbara and Ontario. Horizon Air had been operating these routes with Bombardier CRJ700 aircraft; however Horizon retired this aircraft from its fleet. Alaska Airlines had a similar agreement with PenAir for Alaskan flights and Horizon Air for flights in the lower 48.

On November 15, 2012, SkyWest began a capacity purchase agreement with American Airlines for 12 Bombardier CRJ200 aircraft operating as American Eagle from American's hub in Los Angeles, California. This codeshare agreement with American was greatly expanded over the next several years to include destinations from American's hubs at Chicago, Dallas/Fort Worth, and Phoenix. Larger CRJ700/900 aircraft were introduced to the American Eagle system in 2016, and the smaller CRJ200s were discontinued in 2020. Embraer 175 aircraft joined the American Eagle system in late 2021.

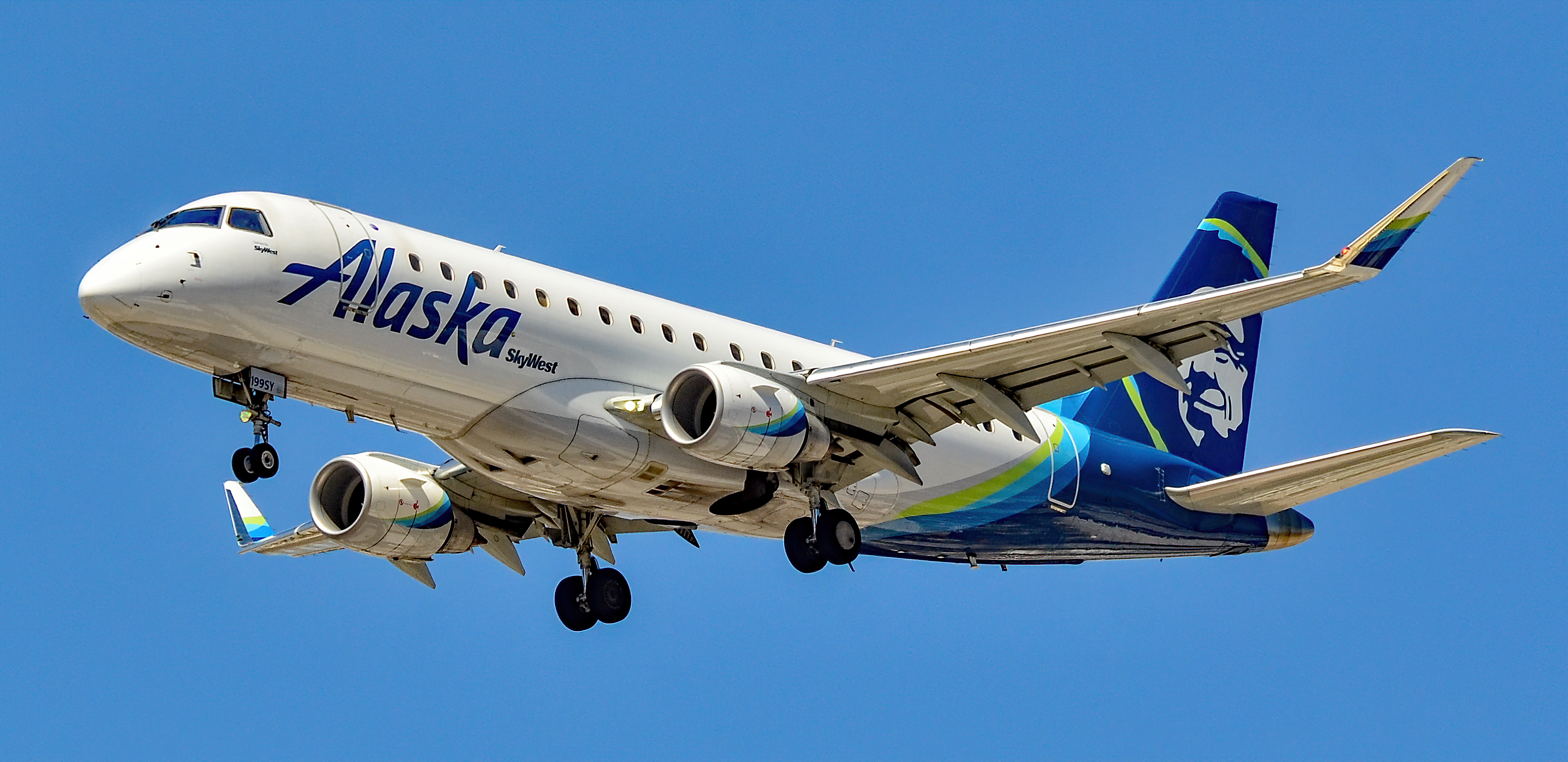
Embraer 175, operated for Alaska Airlines

On September 6, 2017, SkyWest Airlines reported that it has entered into aircraft purchase agreements and capacity purchase agreements to acquire and fly 15 new aircraft with Delta Air Lines and 10 new aircraft with Alaska Airlines. Of the 25 aircraft, 15 Embraer 175SC aircraft will fly under an agreement with Delta in a 70-seat configuration. The Embraer 175SC is built on the same airframe as other Embraer 175 aircraft and can be retrofitted to 76 seats in the future. The agreement with Alaska includes 10 Embraer 175 aircraft which will be configured with 76 seats, similar to aircraft SkyWest has previously placed into service with Alaska. Expected delivery dates of the 25 aircraft run from March 2018 through the end of 2018.

On December 18, 2018, SkyWest, Inc. announced that it would sell ExpressJet Airlines to another airline holding company with ties to United Airlines, ExpressJet's sole client. The $70 million sale closed on January 23, 2019.

In early 2024, regional carrier SkyWest Airlines purchased a 25% ownership stake of Contour Airlines to gain access to its infrastructure, personnel, and operational expertise as it launches its own Part 135 operation. SkyWest also plans to supply Contour with CRJ200 aircraft and partner with the airline to both recruit young pilots and provide opportunities to pilots who would otherwise need to retire due to age.

In March 2024, SkyWest Airlines signed a deal with United Airlines to operate an additional 20 Embraer 175 aircraft for United Express. Unlike other aircraft, these are financed by United Airlines, not SkyWest.

== Corporate affairs ==
=== Business model ===
Approximately 87% of SkyWest's flights operate under capacity purchase agreements. Under a capacity purchase agreement, the partner airline generally pays a fixed-fee for each departure, flight hour (measured from takeoff to landing, excluding taxi time) and block hour (measured from takeoff to landing, including taxi time) and an amount per aircraft in service each month with additional incentives based on completion of flights, on-time performance and other operating metrics. The remaining 13% of flights are operated under a pro-rate agreement, with SkyWest assuming all costs, setting fares, retaining all revenue from non-connecting passengers, and splitting the fares of connecting passengers on a pro-rated basis with the partner airline. SkyWest currently operates on a pro-rate agreement with United Airlines utilizing approximately 25 CRJ200 aircraft, and with Delta Air Lines utilizing 16 CRJ700/CRJ550 aircraft and 1 CRJ900 aircraft.

As of early 2021, SkyWest operates in 50 smaller cities that are subsidized under the federal government's Essential Air Service program. 36 are served under the United Express brand and 14 under the Delta Connection brand. The state of Wyoming subsidizes service to four other airports in Wyoming and operates under the United Express brand. Most subsidized routes are flown with Bombardier CRJ200 regional jets, while others are flown with the Bombardier CRJ550 (part of the Bombardier CRJ700 series).

=== Financials ===
SkyWest is a subsidiary of SkyWest, Inc., an airline holding company that also provides contract ground handling services. SkyWest Airlines' performance figures are fully incorporated into the accounts of its parent company, SkyWest, Inc. SkyWest Airlines stand alone figures ('SkyWest Airlines segment' data in the Group accounts) are shown below:

	2012	2013	2014	2015	2016	2017	2018	2019	2020	2021	2022	2023	2024	2025
Revenue (in millions of US$)	1,930	1,828	1,874	1,848	1,935	2,173	2,346	2,479	1,637	2,615	2,900	2,935	3,528	4,058
Profit before tax (in millions of US$)	106	140	76	182	23	263	307	250	(92)	151	93	40	432	566
Number of passengers (in millions)							40.3	43.7	21.3	36.6	40.1	38.6	42.3	46.0
Number of aircraft (Note: Number of aircraft in scheduled service or under code-share agreements contract at year end. Does not include aircraft leased to other carriers.)		334	362	348	368	422	470	483	452	509	517	485	492	487
Notes/sources									(Note: 2020: Activities and income in fiscal 2020 were severely reduced by the impact of the coronavirus pandemic)					

== Network ==
As of December 2025, SkyWest flies to 256 destinations throughout North America across 45 states and Washington D.C., 5 Canadian provinces and 12 Mexican cities.

Hubs

- Chicago–O'Hare (American, United)
- Denver (United)
- Detroit (Delta)
- Houston–Intercontinental (United)
- Los Angeles (Alaska, American, Delta, United)
- Minneapolis/St. Paul (Delta)
- Phoenix–Sky Harbor (American)
- Portland (OR) (Alaska)
- Salt Lake City (Delta)
- San Francisco (Alaska, United)
- Seattle/Tacoma (Alaska, Delta)

Crew bases

- Austin
- Atlanta
- Boise
- Chicago–O'Hare
- Colorado Springs
- Dallas/Fort Worth
- Denver
- Detroit
- Fresno
- Houston–Intercontinental
- Los Angeles
- Minneapolis/St. Paul
- Palm Springs
- Phoenix–Sky Harbor
- Portland (OR)
- Salt Lake City
- San Diego
- San Francisco
- Seattle/Tacoma
- Tucson

Maintenance bases

- Boise
- Chicago–O'Hare
- Colorado Springs
- Detroit
- Fresno
- Milwaukee
- Nashville
- Oklahoma City
- Palm Springs
- Shreveport
- Salt Lake City
- South Bend
- Tucson

== Fleet ==
=== Current fleet ===
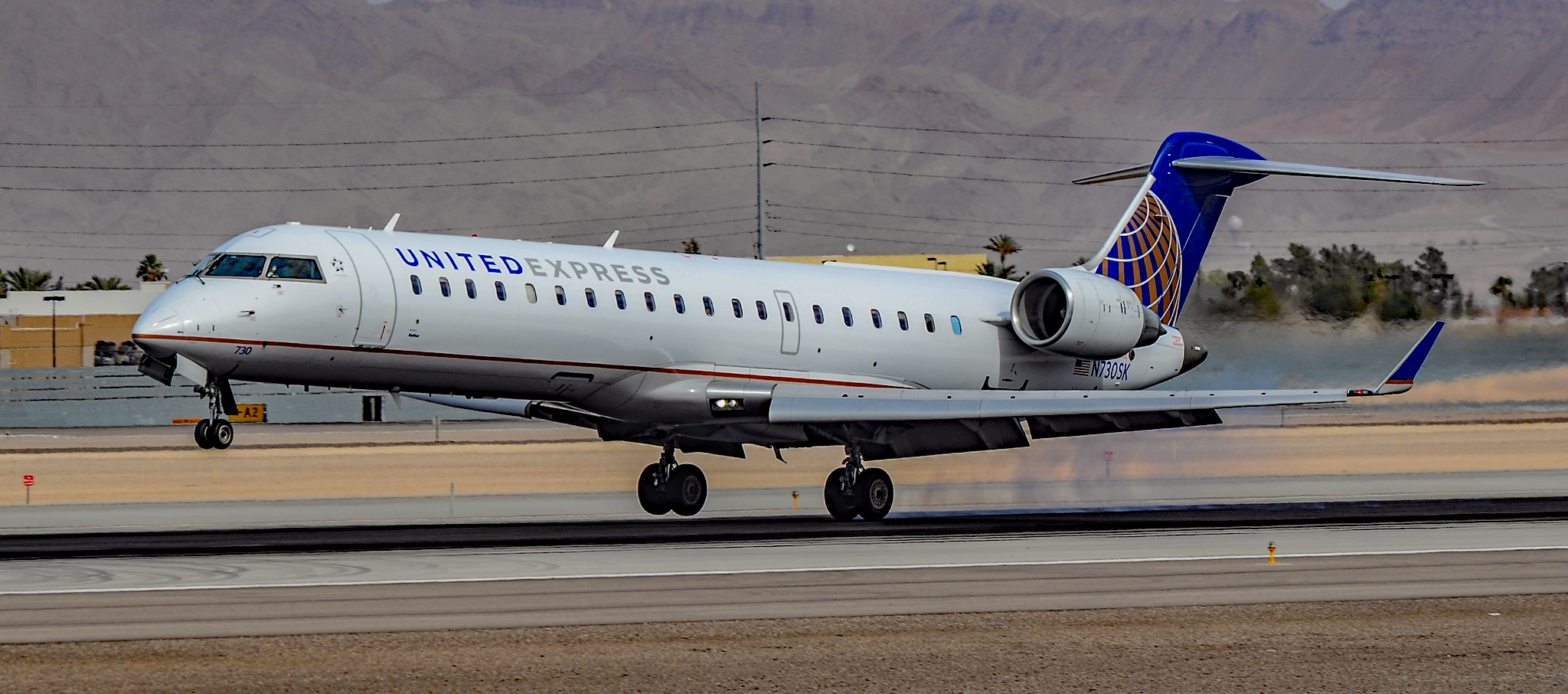
A Bombardier CRJ700, operated for United Express

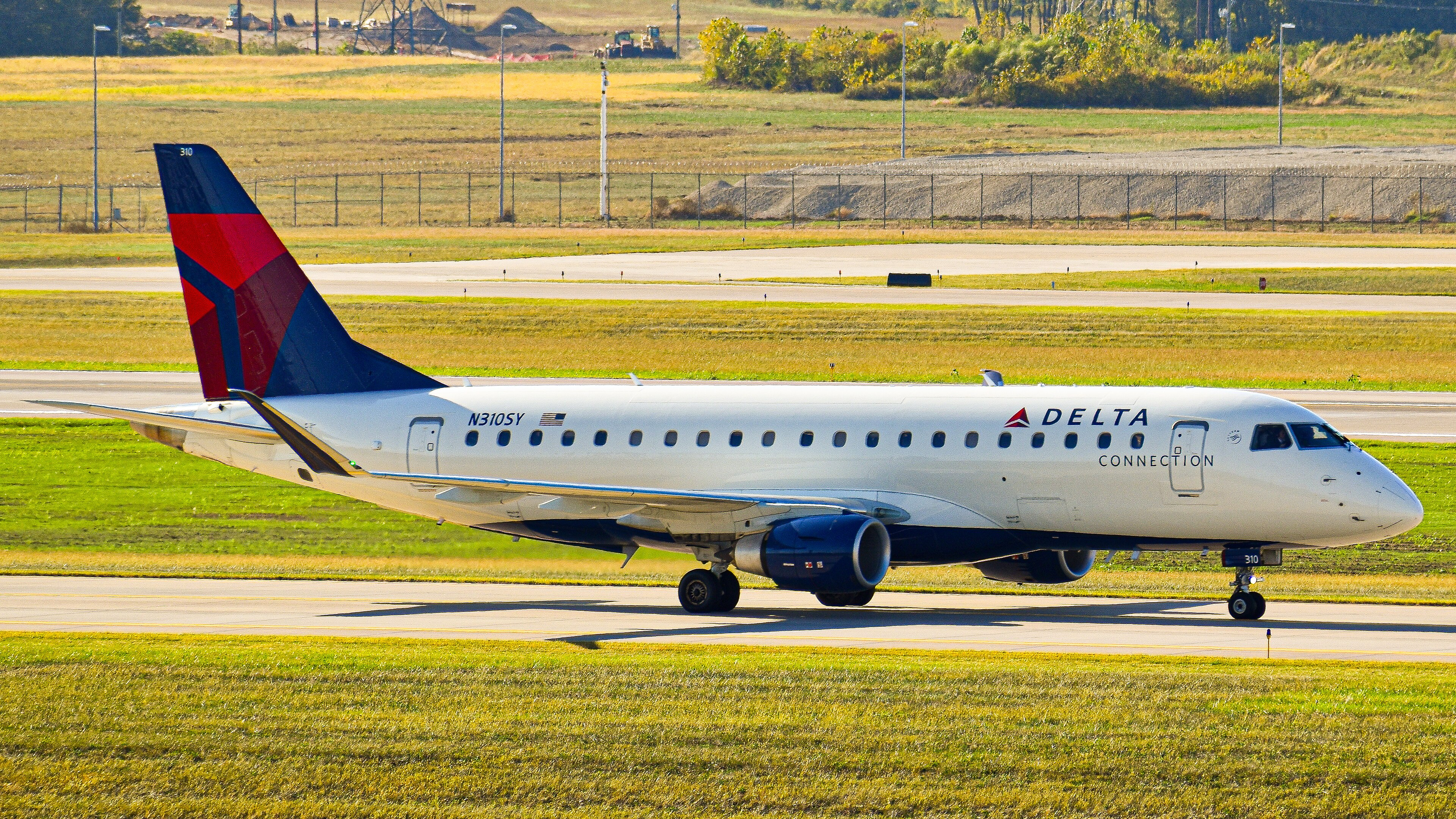
A Embraer 175, operated for Delta Connection

SkyWest has the largest fleet of any regional airline in the United States. Since 2015, the airline has exclusively operated jet aircraft. Most SkyWest aircraft are painted in the livery of partner carriers, but SkyWest does have a small number of aircraft in its own livery that can be operated for any partner airline as needed.

SkyWest is a major operator of the Bombardier CRJ family of regional jets, was the launch customer for CRJ200, is the largest operator of the CRJ200 and took delivery of the last CRJ ever built, a CRJ900. The airline is also the largest operator of the Embraer 175.

Like most regional airlines in the United States, SkyWest is subject to scope clause requirements of its mainline carrier partners and their pilot unions; those requirements limit the size of the number aircraft flown by a regional airline of a particular seating capacity or max gross takeoff weight.

As of December 2025, SkyWest Airlines operates the following aircraft:

SkyWest Airlines fleet
Aircraft	In service	Orders	Passengers				Operated for	Notes
Aircraft	In service	Orders	F	Y+	Y	Total	Operated for	Notes
Bombardier CRJ200	58	—	—	4	46	50	United Express	
Bombardier CRJ200	11	—	—	30	—	30	SkyWest Charter	
Bombardier CRJ450	—	50	7	16	18	41	United Express	Converted CRJ200s entering service in Fall 2026 through 2028.
Bombardier CRJ550	14	5	10	20	20	50	Delta Connection	All are conversions of previous CRJ700 aircraft.
Bombardier CRJ550	26	24	10	20	20	50	United Express	All are conversions of previous CRJ700 aircraft.
Bombardier CRJ700	68	—	9	16	40	65	American Eagle	All CRJ700 to be replaced by Embraer 175 in 2027.
Bombardier CRJ700	4	—	9	12	44	65	Delta Connection	All CRJ700 to be replaced by Embraer 175 in 2027.
Bombardier CRJ700	4	—	9	16	44	69	Delta Connection	All CRJ700 to be replaced by Embraer 175 in 2027.
Bombardier CRJ700	11	—	6	16	48	70	United Express	To be replaced by Embraer 175 by 2026 and converted into CRJ550.
Bombardier CRJ900	28	—	12	20	38	70	Delta Connection	11 aircraft to be replaced by Embraer 175 in 2027.
Bombardier CRJ900	28	—	12	20	44	76	Delta Connection	11 aircraft to be replaced by Embraer 175 in 2027.
Bombardier CRJ900	8	—	12	24	40	76	American Eagle	To be transferred from Mesa Airlines and Delta Connection.
Embraer 175	42	1	12	16	48	76	Alaska Airlines	Delivery scheduled for 2026.
Embraer 175	20	—	12	20	44	76	American Eagle	
Embraer 175	87	—	12	20	38	70	Delta Connection	
Embraer 175	87	16	12	20	44	76	Delta Connection	Deliveries scheduled to begin in 2027.
Embraer 175	121	8	12	32	26	70	United Express	Deliveries scheduled through 2026.
Embraer 175	121	—	12	16	48	76	United Express	
Embraer 175	—	44	TBA				TBA	Deliveries scheduled to begin in 2027. Options for additional 50.
Fleet total	498	148						

Note: the above chart only shows aircraft in scheduled service. It does not include aircraft owned by SkyWest but that are: leased to other operators, removed from service, transitioning between agreements with partners, used as spares, parked, or in the process of being parted out.

=== Historical fleet ===
SkyWest previously operated Embraer EMB 120 turboprop aircraft until 2015. The airline also operated Fairchild Metroliner turboprops. In 1984, SkyWest was operating the largest Metro propjet fleet in the world with 26 aircraft, and by 1991 the Metro fleet had grown to 35 aircraft with 15 Brasilia propjets also being operated. By 1994, the first jet, a Bombardier CRJ100, was added to the fleet and by 1996 all of the Metro propjets had been retired as they were progressively replaced with Brasilia aircraft. SkyWest was also the launch customer for the CRJ200 regional jet.

According to the airline's website, at its inception SkyWest was operating all flights in the early 1970s with small propeller-driven, piston-engine aircraft, including:

- Piper Cherokee 140 – two passenger seats
- Piper Cherokee Arrow – four passenger seats
- Piper Cherokee Six – six passenger seats
- Piper Navajo – eight passenger seats
- Piper Navajo Chieftain – nine passenger seats

== Lawsuits ==
In October 2023, SkyWest was sued by the Association of Flight Attendants (AFA-CWA), who alleged that the company illegally fired two flight attendants as retaliation for engaging in protected union organizing activities and that the company illegally stood up a company union in violation of the Railway Labor Act.

In July 2024, the US Department of Labor also sued SkyWest, alleging that company financially supported and controlled the SkyWest Inflight Association (SIA) as a company union, and that the SIA under SkyWest's control failed to perform its duties as a representative agency and illegally barred two employees from running for leadership positions due to their support for an independent labor union.

== Accidents and incidents ==
- January 15, 1987: SkyWest Airlines Flight 1834, a Fairchild Metroliner, collided with a Mooney M20 transporting an instructor and a student, while on a flight between Pocatello, Idaho, and Salt Lake City, in the vicinity of Kearns, Utah. All ten aboard both planes, eight on Flight 1834 and two in the Mooney, were killed. The accident was found to be a navigation error of the student pilot aboard the Mooney.
- January 15, 1990: SkyWest Airlines Flight 5855, a Fairchild Metroliner, collided with terrain during an instrument approach to Elko, Nevada. There were four serious and nine minor injuries, but no fatalities. The aircraft was damaged beyond repair and was written off.
- February 1, 1991: SkyWest Airlines Flight 5569, a Fairchild Metroliner, was awaiting departure clearance on an active runway at Los Angeles International Airport for a scheduled flight to Palmdale when USAir Flight 1493, a Boeing 737-300 arriving from Columbus, Ohio, collided with it while it was landing. SkyWest 5569 was directed hold on runway 24L, one minute later, US1493 was cleared to land on 24L by the same controller. The 737 landed on the SkyWest aircraft. The two planes slid down the runway, then off to the side, coming to rest against an unoccupied firehouse, and burst into flames. All twelve on the SkyWest aircraft were killed (ten passengers and two pilots), and 22 of the 89 aboard the 737 died (20 passengers, one pilot, and one flight attendant). The cause was found to be air traffic controller error.
- May 26, 2007: SkyWest Airlines Flight 5741, an Embraer EMB 120, was involved in a serious runway incursion when the plane nearly collided with Republic Airways Flight 4912, an Embraer 170, on intersecting runways at San Francisco International Airport. There were no reported injuries to passengers and no reported damage to either aircraft. The cause was found to be air traffic controller error.
- July 17, 2012: suspended SkyWest Airlines pilot and fugitive murder suspect Brian Hedglin, whose ex-girlfriend had been found stabbed to death at his Colorado Springs residence, stole a parked SkyWest CRJ200ER, N865AS, at St. George Regional Airport in Utah. He clipped a jet bridge and the terminal building, then taxied it through a fence and into a parking lot, crashing into several parked cars, and shot himself dead in the aircraft aisle. N865AS was damaged beyond repair and written off; there was no one else aboard and no reported injuries to anyone but Hedglin.

== See also ==
- Air transportation in the United States
