= CCAir =

US regional airline

IATA	ICAO	Call sign
ED	CDL	CAROLINA
- Founded: 1986; 39 years ago
- Ceased operations: November 4, 2002; 23 years ago
- Fleet size: See narrative
- Parent company: Mesa Air Group
- Headquarters: Charlotte, North Carolina, United States

CCAir, Inc. (NASDAQ: CCAR) was a regional airline headquartered in Charlotte, North Carolina, United States.

== Piedmont Commuter ==
CCAir was created on or about February 15, 1986 when Sunbird Airlines was renamed. Operating as a Piedmont Commuter / USAir Express code-sharing partner, its radio call sign was "Carolina". The CC stood for Carolina Commuter. Most of the employees were local people who were extremely loyal to the company.

CCAir (beginning as predecessor Sunbird Airlines) had experienced a tremendous period of growth in the years 1985–1987. With the Piedmont/USAir merger in 1989, the company experienced a tremendous change in the compensation arrangements with their senior partner. These problems eventually led to the company filing bankruptcy in order to protect themselves from creditors. Former CEO Ken Gann, was responsible for turning around the airline and restructuring it. CCAir was the first commuter airline to ever enter Chapter 11 bankruptcy and emerge profitable.

CCAir began with a fleet of Cessna 402 "Businessliner" piston-engined aircraft as well as Beech 99 and Short 330 commuter turboprops. After the changeover to CCAIR the Cessna were retired and the Short 330's were replaced by the new Shorts 360. CCAir also acquired the British Aerospace BAe Jetstream 32, a pressurized turboprop aircraft which proved a poor choice as most flights were operated under 10,000 feet and maintenance costs were high. In the mid-90s code-sharing partner US Airways directed CCAir to begin the acquisition of DeHavilland Canada Dash 8 aircraft.

== Under Mesa ownership ==
In 1999, Mesa Air Group acquired CCAir. Under Mesa CEO Jonathan Ornstein, CCAir and Mesa were operated as separate airlines. Some CCAir gate/ticket agents and ground handlers attempted to unionize, but the vote was narrowly against representation. Ornstein promised to work with ground personnel, but shortly thereafter canceled the ground handling service with US Airways Express. Also several cities in North Carolina, Hickory, Southern Pines/Pinehurst, Kinston and Rocky Mount lost their air service, which was flown by CCAir. The CCAir pilots resisted many offers to take pay cuts and deep concessions to have the chance for growth and flying regional jets.

Ornstein slowly started making changes to CCAir. First the high-maintenance Jetstream 32s were grounded and Mesa's Beech 1900s were brought in to replace the Jetstreams. Finally, in 2002, a deep concessionary agreement was proposed to the CCAir pilots. When voted upon and ratified, Air Line Pilots Association (ALPA) president, Duane Woerth promised the CCAir pilots he would sign off on the agreement, but reneged when he felt the agreement was too concessionary in nature. A few pilots attempted to sue ALPA in federal court in Charlotte, but US District Court Judge Graham Muellen upheld ALPA's decision not to allow the new collective bargaining agreement to take effect.

On November 4, 2002, CCAir ceased operations. Most CCAir pilots found employment with Mesa and Mesa's collective bargaining agreement in their respective operations.

== See also ==
- List of defunct airlines of the United States
