= Atlantic Southeast Airlines =

Regional airline of the United States (1979–2011)

| IATA | ICAO | Call sign |
|---|---|---|
| EV | ASQ | ACEY (1979–1999; 2006–2015); CANDLER (1999–2006) |
- Founded: March 12, 1979
- Commenced operations: June 27, 1979
- Ceased operations: December 31, 2011 (merged into ExpressJet)
- Hubs: Atlanta; Chicago–O'Hare; Dallas/Fort Worth (before 2005); Detroit; Washington–Dulles
- Frequent-flyer program: SkyMiles (Delta); Mileage Plus (United)
- Alliance: SkyTeam (Delta); Star Alliance (United)
- Subsidiaries: ExpressJet
- Fleet size: 168
- Destinations: 128
- Parent company: Delta Air Lines (1999–2005); SkyWest, Inc. (2005–2011)
- Headquarters: A-Tech Center, College Park, Georgia, U.S.
- Key people: Brad Holt (President & COO)
- Website: www.flyasa.com

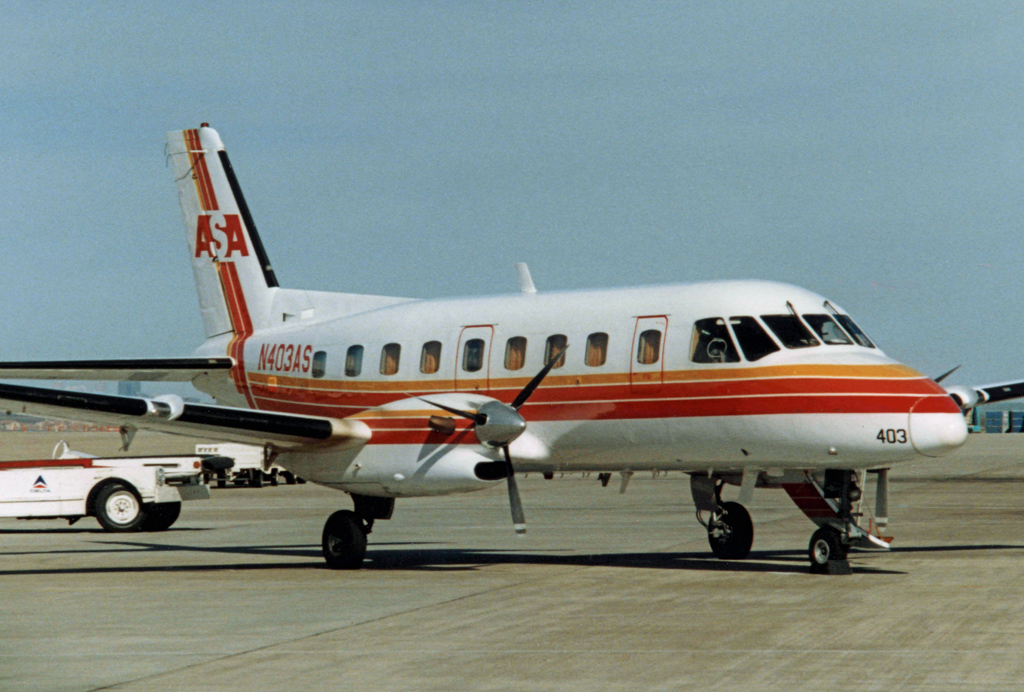
ASA Embraer EMB-110 Bandeirante at Dallas Fort Worth International Airport in April 1987

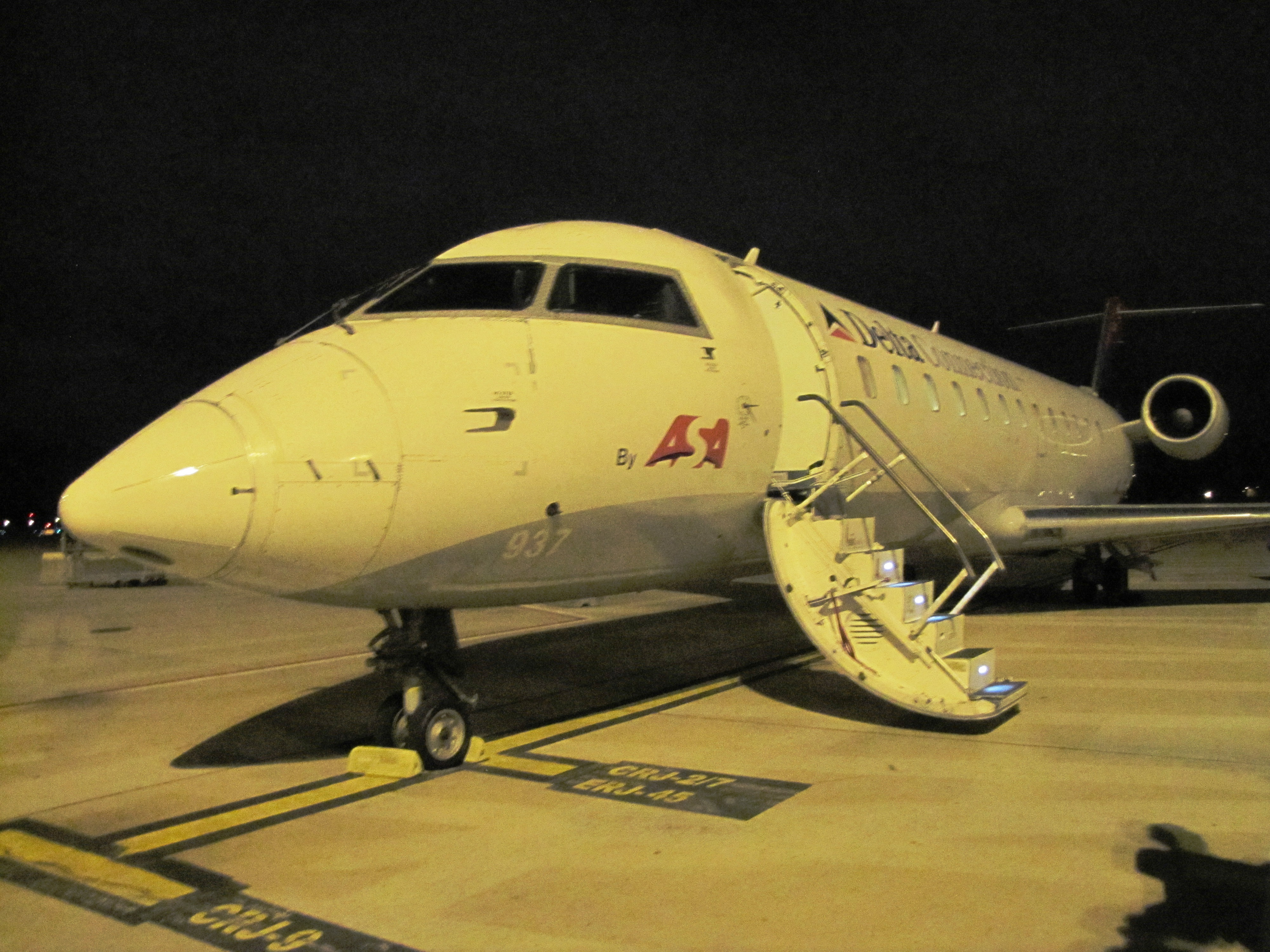
An ASA CRJ-200 at Memphis International Airport

Atlantic Southeast Airlines (ASA) was a regional airline in the United States based in the A-Tech Center in College Park, Georgia, flying to 144 destinations as a Delta Connection carrier on behalf of Delta Air Lines via a code sharing agreement; in February 2010, it also commenced service as a United Express carrier on behalf of United Airlines via a separate code sharing agreement. It was a wholly owned subsidiary of SkyWest, Inc. ASA operated nearly 900 flights each day. Its main hub was located at Hartsfield–Jackson Atlanta International Airport (ATL), which is also a hub for Delta. After a 2010 merger with ExpressJet, ASA adopted the ExpressJet name and branding in 2011.

In November 2011, ASA and ExpressJet received a single operating certificate from the FAA and, in December 2011, all flights were then operated by ExpressJet on behalf of its major airline code sharing partners.

== History ==
On March 12, 1979, the company was incorporated as Atlantic Southeast Airlines, Inc. with headquarters established in the Atlanta area. June 27 saw the start of operations with three 19-passenger de Havilland Canada DHC-6 Twin Otter turboprop aircraft on an intrastate route between Atlanta and Columbus. From 1979 to 1999 the call sign for ASA was "ACEY". In 1999 there was confusion between the ACEY call sign and that of the Federal Aviation Administration (FAA) New Mexico-based fighter unit's call sign "ACER". The FAA insisted that one of the entities change its call sign; ASA was the one to change since it had used ACEY for the least amount of time. June 27, 1999, ASA changed to call sign CAA "Candler" after the founder of Coca-Cola, Asa Candler (whose first name also forms the company's acronym). On March 15, 2006, ASA was allowed to change its call sign back to ACEY, after the New Mexico fighter unit was disestablished. Over the years, ASA's ICAO identifier changed from ASE to CAA to ACY to ASQ.. The company went public when the initial stock offering was completed in 1982.

The first of a fleet of Embraer EMB-110 Bandeirante twin engine turboprop commuter airliners was delivered to ASA in December 1980. On April 1, 1983, the company acquired Southeastern Airlines. On May 1, 1984, ASA joined the Delta Connection program as one of the first regional partners. After only a few years as a true regional airline, the company was named 'Regional Airline of the Year' by Air Transport World in January 1987.

ASA initiated jet service with introduction of British Aerospace BAe 146-200 aircraft in 1995. Two years later, the company began using Canadair CRJ200 regional jets for service from its Atlanta hub. CRJ service from the Dallas/Fort Worth hub began in 2000.

On September 8, 1998, the company was honored as one of the global aviation and aerospace industry's best managed companies by Aviation Week and Space Technology magazine.

Delta Air Lines acquired the company on March 22, 1999, increasing its stake in Atlantic Southeast Airlines from 28% to 100%, and operations began on May 11 of that year. In 2000, Comair, a Delta Connection partner, joined ASA in announcing industry's largest regional jet order. Also in 2000, ASA went international with flights to Toronto, Canada, from Atlanta.

In 2001, President Skip Barnette was named Regional Airline Executive of the year by the 2000 Commuter/Regional Airline News. Near the end of 2001, ASA carried the 2002 Olympic Flame between Miami, Florida, and Mobile, Alabama, as part of Delta's sponsorship of the 2002 Winter Olympic Games in Salt Lake City, Utah.

In 2002, ASA received and began using its first Delta Connection 70-seat Canadair (now Bombardier) CRJ700 aircraft. All previous CRJs were CRJ200 models, which only offered 50 seats. Also in 2002, ASA began service to its 100th airport: Cincinnati/Northern Kentucky International Airport in Cincinnati, Ohio. By June 2003, ASA had received its 100th CRJ. In 2004, a special-edition CRJ700 was delivered to ASA to celebrate its 25th anniversary of passenger service.

On August 15, 2005, Delta announced that it had entered into an agreement to sell ASA to SkyWest, Inc. for $425 million, and on September 8, 2005, SkyWest announced that the acquisition had been completed, and that the code shares and flying would commence that night.

Shortly after the completion of the purchase by SkyWest, Inc. the decision was made to close ASA's Salt Lake City hub and transfer 12 of ASA's CRJ700s to SkyWest Airlines. Eventually only 4 of the 12 airplanes were transferred between the certificates. SkyWest Airlines also took delivery of the remainder of ASA's regional jet orders, as 5 additional CRJ700s and 17 CRJ900s.

On June 1, 2006, ASA filed with the US Department of Transportation for an exemption to begin service from Los Angeles International Airport to nine Mexican destinations under the Delta Connection brand. This service is contingent on US as well as Mexican government approvals. ASA also announced the opening of a Los Angeles crew base on December 1, 2006, to support the expanded west coast operations. ASA began operations at its new Los Angeles focus city on December 15, 2006.

On December 20, 2006, Skywest Inc. announced that 8 Comair CRJ700 aircraft would be transferred to Atlantic Southeast Airlines and operated out of Delta's Cincinnati hub beginning in January 2007. This followed a request for proposal put out by Delta Air Lines aiming to reduce costs of its Delta Connection service.

On December 30, 2008, Delta announced that 10 CRJ900 aircraft would be allocated to Atlantic Southeast Airlines beginning in April 2009. Eight aircraft will be delivered from the factory and two already in service with Pinnacle Airlines will be transferred to ASA. As part of the fleet enhancement, 20 CRJ200 aircraft were removed from ASA's Delta Connection Agreement beginning in June 2010.

ASA had the lowest rate of on-time performance, and the worst rate of mishandled baggage among all 19 US air carriers reporting to the US Department of Transportation for the full-year 2006. ASA's baggage handling performance improved slightly in 2007, but they once again ranked last out of all 20 reporting carriers for on-time performance. ASA is not directly responsible for the mishandled baggage problems since ASA baggage is handled by Delta Air Lines. Under former CEO Brad Holt's new leadership, on-time performance steadily improved, with full recoveries in markets such as Montgomery, Alabama, where ASA was honored for exceeding the city's expectation in improving performance.

After over five years of contentious negotiations with the Air Line Pilots Association, a new three-year agreement was reached in late September 2007 with ASA's 1800 pilots. ASA's Flight Attendants represented by the Association of Flight Attendants reached a contract agreement as of August 2008.

On May 21, 2010, Atlantic Southeast unveiled a new brand (top of page on right), moving away from "ASA," and a new vision.

In August 2010, SkyWest announced that it had entered into a definitive merger agreement with ExpressJet Holdings, whereby Atlantic Southeast, as SkyWest's wholly owned subsidiary, will purchase ExpressJet for $6.75 per share. Day one of the combined airlines was Friday, November 12, 2010. The combined airline will be based in Atlanta. At the time ExpressJet operated as Continental Express and United Express. The airline expected to be operating under one certificate 4th quarter of 2011.

On July 13, 2011, Atlantic Southeast announced that it would change its name to "SureJet" after completion of its merger with ExpressJet. However, the reaction of employee groups at both airlines was so negative that the new name was put on hold less than 24 hours after being announced. Brand information and press releases pertaining to "SureJet" were removed from Atlantic Southeast's public and employee websites and the company's combined identity was reconsidered. On October 14, 2011, the company announced that Atlantic Southeast's official company name would change to ExpressJet Airlines on December 31, 2011. On November 22, 2011, both Atlantic Southeast and ExpressJet gained approval from the FAA for a single operating certificate that would allow them to operate as a single carrier under the ExpressJet name making ExpressJet the largest regional airline in the world with more than 400 aircraft.

== Fleet ==
As of January 2011, the Atlantic Southeast Airlines fleet consisted of the following aircraft with an average age of 8.4 years:

| Aircraft | In service | Passengers | | |
| Aircraft | In service | F | Y | Total |
|---|---|---|---|---|
| Bombardier CRJ-200 | 112 | 0 | 50 | 50 |
| Bombardier CRJ-700 | 46 | 9 | 56 | 65 |
| Bombardier CRJ-900 | 10 | 12 | 64 | 76 |
| Total | 168 | | | |

Most CRJ aircraft were operated for Delta Connection, though 14 CRJ-200 aircraft were operated for United Express.

=== Previous aircraft ===
Embraer Brasilia aircraft were retired from service in 2003, and aircraft that have not been sold are in storage at Hot Springs, Arkansas. The airline operated the following aircraft types at various times during its existence:

- 19 - ATR 72-210
- 6 - BAe 146-200 (first jet aircraft type operated by ASA)
- 2 - de Havilland Canada DHC-6 Twin Otter
- 5 - de Havilland Canada Dash 7
- 13 - Embraer EMB-110
- 67 - Embraer EMB-120
- 10 - Short 360

== Corporate affairs ==
=== Corporate headquarters ===
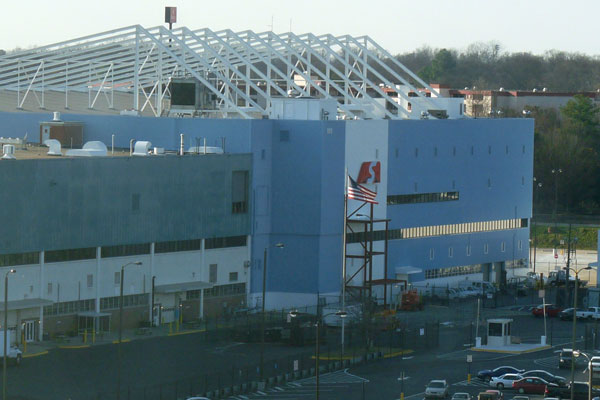
Former Atlantic Southeast Airlines headquarters at Hartsfield-Jackson Atlanta International Airport

Before the merger, it headquartered in the A-Tech Center in College Park, Georgia, The City of Atlanta owns the facility, which now houses the Atlanta Police Department Helicopter Unit.

In December 2007 the airline announced it was moving its headquarters into the A-Tech facility, a hangar at Hartsfield-Jackson Atlanta International Airport previously named the "North Hangar." The 203,000-square-foot (18,900 m^{2}) hangar includes 100,000 square feet (9,300 m^{2}) of hangar bays for aircraft maintenance. It has 17 acres (6.9 ha) of adjacent land and 1,400 parking spaces for employees. The airline planned to relocate 100 employees from Macon, Georgia, to the new headquarters. The Atlanta City Council and Mayor of Atlanta Shirley Franklin approved of the new 25-year ASA lease, which also gave the airline new hangar space to work on 15 to 25 aircraft in overnight maintenance; previously its aircraft were serviced at Concourse C. The airport property division stated that the hangar was built in the 1960s and renovated in the 1970s. Eastern Airlines and Delta Air Lines had previously occupied the hangar. Delta's lease originally was scheduled to expire in 2010, but the airline returned the lease to the City of Atlanta in 2005 as part of its bankruptcy settlement. The city collected an insurance settlement of almost $900,000 as a result of the cancellation.

The airline had its headquarters in Greater Atlanta for a 26-year span until December 2007. In 1985 Atlantic Southeast Airlines was headquartered in what is now College Park. In 1995 ASA was headquartered in a building in the Atlanta City limits. Prior to the headquarters move to the hangar, the ASA headquarters were in 61,000 square feet (5,700 m^{2}) of space in the 100 Hartsfield Centre Parkway building, now named One Hartsfield Centre. That building is also in College Park, near Hartsfield Airport. ASA had occupied Suite 800. The airline announced it was moving to the A-Tech Center as its lease was expiring at 100 Hartsfield Centre Parkway.

== Incidents and accidents ==
- Flight 2366 (Lawton, Oklahoma, May 24, 1988; Crashed due to engine failure on take-off)
- Flight 2254 (Gadsden, Alabama, April 9, 1990; collided with a Civil Air Patrol Cessna 172 after takeoff from Northeast Alabama Regional Airport)
- Flight 2311 (Brunswick, Georgia, April 5, 1991; killed 23, including former U.S. Senator John Tower and astronaut Sonny Carter)
- Flight 529 (near Carrollton, Georgia, August 21, 1995, killed 9)
- Flight 5058 (Baton Rouge Metropolitan Airport), September 2, 2011; Canadair CRJ-200 N875AS landed with the left main undercarriage retracted. There were no injuries amongst the 50 passengers and three crew on board.

== See also ==
- List of defunct airlines of the United States
