= Las Cruces International Airport =

Airport in New Mexico, United States

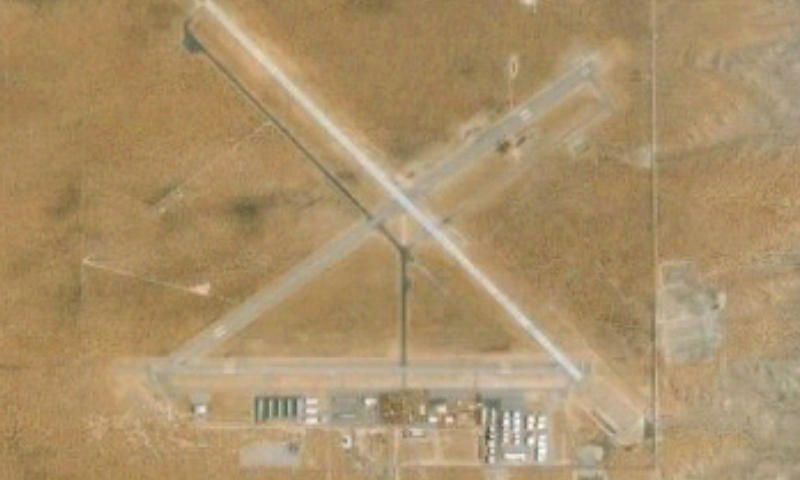
- IATA: LRU; ICAO: KLRU; FAA LID: LRU

Summary
- Airport type: Public
- Owner: City of Las Cruces
- Serves: Las Cruces, New Mexico
- Elevation AMSL: 4,457 ft (1,358 m)
- Coordinates: 32°17′22″N 106°55′19″W
- Website: Official website

Map
- Location of airport in New Mexico

Runways
Direction	Length		Surface
Direction	ft	m	Surface
04/22	7,501	2,286	Asphalt
08/26	6,069	1,850	Asphalt
12/30	7,506	2,288	Concrete

Statistics (2016)
- Aircraft operations: 79,880
- Based aircraft: 134
- Source: Federal Aviation Administration

Las Cruces International Airport (IATA: LRU, ICAO: KLRU, FAA LID: LRU) is a city-owned, public airport nine miles west of the central business district of Las Cruces, in Doña Ana County, New Mexico. It is in the National Plan of Integrated Airport Systems for 2019–23 which categorized it as a regional general aviation facility.

LRU is a landing rights airport and is on a mesa overlooking the Mesilla Valley. The airport was the base for Zia Airlines from 1972 to 1980.

The airport is used by general aviation, the United States government, New Mexico State University, private charters and the local CAP squadron. National Guard's C Company, 3rd Battalion, 140th Aviation Regiment, operates and houses four UH-72 Lakota helicopters at the Las Cruces International Airport. Additionally, as of 2023, passenger air service has returned in a limited capacity after an 18-year absence, for which the field also retains a terminal.

== Facilities and aircraft ==
Las Cruces International Airport covers 2,193 acres (887 ha) at an elevation of 4,457 feet (1,358 m) above mean sea level. It has three runways: 4/22 is 7,501 by 106 feet (2,286 x 32 m) asphalt; 8/26 is 6,069 by 100 feet (1,850 x 30 m) asphalt; 12/30 is 7,506 by 100 feet (2,288 x 30 m) concrete.

In the year ending December 31, 2017 the airport had 79,880 total aircraft operations, an average of 219 per day: 67.4% military, 28.2% general aviation, and 4.5% air taxi. 136 aircraft were then based at this airport: 72% single-engine, 9.6% multi-engine, 2.2% jet, 2.2% helicopter, 2.9% glider, 8.1% ultralight, and 2.9% military.

The airport has two fixed-base operators (FBOs), Southwest Aviation and Francis Aviation. Southwest Aviation provides flight instruction services, aircraft fuel, and facilities to handle corporate aircraft and private charters. Francis Aviation provides aircraft fuel, charters, and facilities to handle corporate aircraft and private charters. Frost Aviation Services also operates at the airport providing flight training services.

== Historical airline service ==
Las Cruces has been served by twelve commercial airlines since the late 1940s:

- Pioneer Air Lines began the first service in 1948 with Las Cruces being a stop on a route between Amarillo and El Paso, Texas. The carrier used Douglas DC-3 aircraft and other stops were made at Clovis and Roswell, New Mexico. Service ended in 1950.
- Continental Airlines served Las Cruces between 1950 and 1954 as a stop along a route between Denver and El Paso. The carrier used Douglas DC-3 aircraft and many other stops were made in Colorado and New Mexico.
- Frontier Airlines served Las Cruces between 1950 and 1953 as a stop along a route between Phoenix and El Paso. Many other stops were made in Arizona and New Mexico and this carrier also used Douglas DC-3 aircraft.
- Bison Airlines served Las Cruces in 1963 and 1964 with flights to Albuquerque and El Paso. The carrier used Aero Commander and De Havilland Dove aircraft.
- Aztec Airlines provided service from Las Cruces to El Paso and Silver City, New Mexico in 1966 and 1967 using Piper Aztec aircraft.
- Zia Airlines was based in Las Cruces and provided flights to Albuquerque and Santa Fe from 1974 through 1980. Flights were occasionally operated to El Paso, Alamogordo and Silver City as well. The carrier used Cessna 402 and Handley Page Jetstream aircraft.
- Stahmann Farms of Las Cruces operated airline service in 1980 with flights to Albuquerque and Santa Fe using Cessna 402 aircraft.
- Airways of New Mexico provided service to El Paso for a short time in 1981 then to Albuquerque from 1981 through 1985 using Cessna 402 and Piper Navajo aircraft. Some Albuquerque flights would stop in Alamogordo.
- JetAire served Las Cruces in 1985 with flights to Albuquerque using a Handley Page Jetstream aircraft.
- Mesa Airlines provided the longest running air service to Las Cruces from 1985 through 2001 with flights to Albuquerque using Beechcraft C99 and Beechcraft 1900 aircraft. Some flights would stop in Alamogordo.
- Westward Airways served Las Cruces in 2004 and 2005 with flights to Albuquerque and Phoenix using Pilatus PC-12 aircraft.
- Advanced Air is the most recent airline to serve Las Cruces after an 18 year hiatus on passenger air services out of the airport. Flights to Albuquerque began on January 16, 2023 using Beechcraft 350 Super King Air turboprop aircraft. Further destinations also being explored as possibilities by the city.

Additionally, charter flights regularly serve the airport, mainly transporting university athletic teams. Large Airbus A320 and Boeing 737-800 aircraft operated by Allegiant Air and Sun Country Airlines often land at the Las Cruces International Airport. On December 27, 2022, three Sun Country Boeing 737-800's were on the ground at Las Cruces simultaneously when returning from Detroit, Michigan after the New Mexico State Aggies football team played in the Quick Lane Bowl game.

== Airlines and destinations ==
=== Passenger ===
Airlines	Destinations	Refs
Advanced Air	Albuquerque	

Total enplaned and deplaned passengers for 2023 was 2,965.
