= Gallup Municipal Airport =

- IATA: GUP; ICAO: KGUP; FAA LID: GUP

Summary
- Airport type: Public
- Owner: City of Gallup
- Serves: Gallup, New Mexico
- Elevation AMSL: 6,472 ft (1,973 m)
- Coordinates: 35°30′40″N 108°47′22″W
- Website: ci.gallup.nm.us/...

Map
- Location within New Mexico Location within the United States

Runways
Direction	Length		Surface
Direction	ft	m	Surface
6/24	7,316	2,230	Asphalt

Statistics (2021)
- Aircraft operations for 12 months ending (04/07/2021): 6,200
- Based aircraft: 18
- Source: Federal Aviation Administration

Gallup Municipal Airport (IATA: GUP, ICAO: KGUP, FAA LID: GUP) is an airport in Gallup in McKinley County, New Mexico, United States, 3 miles (4.8 km) southwest of the city center.

The airport is on Historic Hwy 66. The FBO is Gallup Flying Service; Gallup Med Flight operates Critical Care Air Transport Air Ambulance service.

== Facilities ==
The airport covers 359 acres (145 ha) at an elevation of 6,472 feet (1,973 m); its one runway, 6/24, is 7,316 by 100 feet (2,230 x 30 m) asphalt.

In the year ending March 31, 2009 the airport had 4,643 aircraft operations, average 12 per day: 58% air taxi, 26% general aviation, 12% airline and 4% military. 23 aircraft were then based at this airport: 57% single-engine and 43% multi-engine.

== Historical airline service ==
Gallup has been served by many airlines since the late 1940s. The first was Monarch Airlines which provided Douglas DC-3 flights to Albuquerque and to Salt Lake City with several stops. In 1950 Monarch Airlines merged with two other carriers to become Frontier Airlines. Frontier added flights to Denver and Phoenix, each making several stops en route, and upgraded to larger 50-seat aircraft during the 1960s with the Convair 340 followed by the Convair 580. Frontier's service continued until 1981 when the carrier went to an all jet aircraft fleet and ended service to all their smaller cities.

Meanwhile, several commuter carriers began serving Gallup; Cochise Airlines came in 1979 followed by Desert Airlines in 1980, each with flights to Phoenix making several stops. Sun West Airlines began service later in 1980 with flights to Albuquerque as well as Phoenix using Piper Navajo aircraft and later upgrading with Beechcraft 99s. Their service continued into 1985 at which time Mesa Airlines began operating on the same routes also using Beech 99's. Mesa ended their Albuquerque flights in 1989 and the Phoenix flights became America West Express in 1992 operating as a feeder for America West Airlines using Beechcraft 1900D airliners. The Phoenix service thrived with the major airline code-share and as many as seven flights per day were operated. Mesa/America West Express also added a larger 30-seat Embraer 120 Brasilia aircraft to its schedule for a brief time in 1994.

In the late 1990s commuter airline traffic suffered a major downturn nationwide and the Phoenix flights ended in 1999. Flights to Albuquerque were reinstated under the Mesa Airlines brand but ended three years later. In 2005 Westward Airways provided flights to Phoenix using Pilatus PC-12 aircraft but the airline shut down after a few months. Gallup then went two years without airline service until an agreement was made with Great Lakes Airlines in 2007 to provide flights to Phoenix and Denver (via Farmington) using Beech 1900Ds. This service lasted a little under a year, ending in 2008.

Gallup did not see airline service for fourteen years until Advanced Air began a single daily flight to Phoenix on August 1, 2022. The Phoenix flight was made possible by a 3.5 million dollar Rural Air Service Enhancement grant through the State of New Mexico. A new flight to Las Vegas, Nevada was added in November, 2024 as well as a second daily flight to Phoenix. The Las Vegas flight operates on two days per week.

== Airlines and destinations ==
=== Passenger ===
Airlines	Destinations	Refs
Advanced Air	Las Vegas, Phoenix–Sky Harbor	

Advanced Air operates Raytheon King Air 350 turboprop aircraft on all flights. The aircraft has eight seats arranged in an executive configuration.

=== Cargo ===
Airlines	Destinations
FedEx Feeder	Albuquerque

== Statistics ==
Routes from GUP (August 2024 - July 2025)
Rank	Airport	Passengers	Airline
1	Phoenix–Sky Harbor, Arizona	3,170	Advanced Air
2	Las Vegas, Nevada	260	Advanced Air
