= Sandia Base =

Former US nuclear weapons installation in New Mexico

Coordinates: 35°2′25″N 106°32′59″W

Sandia Base was the principal nuclear weapons installation of the United States Department of Defense from 1946 to 1971. It was located on the southeastern edge of Albuquerque, New Mexico. For 25 years, the top-secret Sandia Base and its subsidiary installation, Manzano Base, carried on the atomic weapons research, development, design, testing, and training commenced by the Manhattan Project during World War II. Fabrication, assembly, and storage of nuclear weapons was also done at Sandia Base. The base played a key role in the United States nuclear deterrence capability during the Cold War. In 1971 it was merged into Kirtland Air Force Base.

== Geography ==
Sandia Base was located at about 35° 02' 25" N, 106° 32' 59" W at an elevation 5,394 feet (1,644 m) above sea level. It was in the southeast quadrant of Albuquerque, bounded roughly by Louisiana Boulevard SE and Kirtland Air Force Base on the west, and Eubank Avenue SE and the Sandia Mountains on the east, and Isleta Pueblo lands on the south. There were security gates on Gibson Avenue SE and Wyoming Boulevard SE.

== Early history ==
The base was created on the site formerly occupied by Oxnard Field, once the major Albuquerque airport. A competing airport took most of the local traffic in the 1930s. The U.S. Army bought the field after 1939.

== Transition to nuclear weapons activities ==
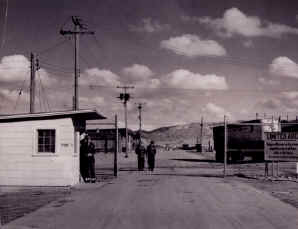
Early security gate at Sandia Base, probably Gibson Avenue

Leslie Groves and Robert Oppenheimer faced the challenges of turning a war-driven, short-term bomb design effort into a stable peacetime operation in charge of producing and maintaining a nuclear stockpile for the nation. A serious short-term problem was retaining personnel, particularly at Los Alamos where many scientists and technicians were eager to return to civilian pursuits. The solutions to the challenges led directly to the transformation of Albuquerque's old Oxnard Field into the nation's principal nuclear weapons installation.

Atomic Bomb engineering was carried out by the Z Division, named for its director, Dr. Jerrold R. Zacharias from Los Alamos. Z Division was conceived as an ordnance design, testing, and assembly arm. However, space was at a premium at Los Alamos. Additionally, members of Z Division needed to work closely with the military. Groves also decided as part of an effort to retain personnel to focus the laboratory more on weapons development by relocating various weapons production and assembly activities away from Los Alamos. Thus, the decision was taken to move Z Division to the old Oxnard Field. Already at the close of the war, the engineering group of Z Division had begun consolidating weapons assembly functions there. Z Division was initially located at Wendover Field, Utah but moved to Oxnard Field, New Mexico, in September 1945 to be closer to Los Alamos. By 1946, the site was being referred to as "Sandia Base" after the nearby Sandia Mountains.

In January 1947, the rest of Z Division completed its move to Sandia Base. That same month, Secretary of War Robert P. Patterson and Secretary of the Navy James V. Forrestal established the Armed Forces Special Weapons Project (AFSWP) to assume all of the military functions of the Manhattan Engineering District. The ASWP took over the Albuquerque base. Z Division and AFSWP brought to Sandia Base the strict secrecy which had prevailed at Los Alamos. In 1947, amid much public speculation about what was going on at Sandia Base, the military would only say that the activities at Sandia Base were secret under the Atomic Energy Act. When Secretary of the Army Kenneth Claiborne Royall visited Sandia Base in 1948, he falsely announced that "guided missile" development was underway at the base.

== The Armed Forces Special Weapons Project and its successors ==
AFSWP was given responsibility for discharging all military functions relating to atomic energy in coordination with the Atomic Energy Commission. General Groves was placed in charge, and reported directly to the Joint Chiefs of Staff. Concerned about the postwar status of the nation's nuclear stockpile, Groves had already dispatched Col. Gilbert M. Dorland to Sandia Base to evaluate the engineering efforts being made there. Dorland eventually assembled a group of about sixty young Army officers, later nicknamed the "Sandia Pioneers," to oversee the bomb fabrication efforts. Dorland also established a nuclear weapons training school at Sandia Base.

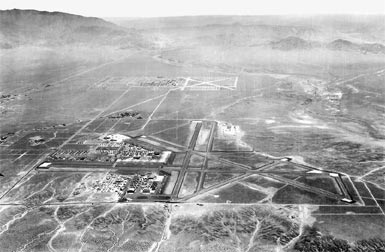
Kirtland Army Air Base (now Kirtland Air Force Base) is seen in the foreground of this 1945 photograph. Looking east, Sandia Base is in the background.

The Pioneers learned and practiced how to assemble atomic bombs and how to load them onto aircraft for long range missions. The aircraft used for these practice missions were Boeing B-29 Superfortress bombers similar to the ones that flew the first atomic missions over Japan in 1945. The Pioneers and the 509th Bombardment Group (successor to the 509th Composite Group that flew the 1945 missions) flew the practice missions from Kirtland AFB to Wendover, Utah. The 509th was stationed at Walker Air Force Base near Roswell, New Mexico.

On April 12, 1950, a B-29 from the 509th Bombardment Group crashed at Sandia Base shortly after takeoff. Thirteen crewmen were killed. The military imposed strict security over the crash site. The official version of the crash stated that the B-29 was on a routine "navigation training flight." The Air Force said the B-29 had taken off from Walker AFB and had landed at Kirtland AFB to "refuel."

At Sandia Base, the Pioneers worked with Sandia Laboratory and the AEC to perfect the design, assembly, storage, and delivery of atomic weapons. In 1948, the Pioneers supported Operation Sandstone, the atmospheric test series at Eniwetok Atoll in the Marshall Islands.

The Sandstone test series was successful, but logistics, weather, security, and safety suggested the need for a continental test site. Thus, AFSWP conducted a top secret study, named Project Nutmeg, to search for such a site. In 1950, AFSWP concluded that a site on the Air Force's Las Vegas Bombing and Gunnery Range in Nevada was the right place. President Truman approved the location, known as Frenchman Flat.

The first post-war continental atomic test was conducted on January 27, 1951. A weapon assembled at Sandia Base was dropped from a Boeing B-50 Superfortress ("D" model) bomber in the successful "Able" shot. Thereafter, some 927 atmospheric and underground nuclear tests occurred at what is now known as the Nevada Test Site. These tests were supported by AFSWP and its successors from Sandia Base and its successor.

A United States Naval Air Detachment of eleven aircraft assigned to Sandia Base in June 1949 was sequentially renamed the Naval Air Special Weapons Facility (NASWF) in August 1952, the Naval Nuclear Ordnance Evaluation Unit (NNOEU) in 1958, and the Naval Weapons Evaluation Facility (NWEF) in March 1961. Before the NWEF ceased flight test operations in September 1992, nuclear compatibility and safety certification had been completed for 76 versions of 32 different Navy nuclear-capable fighter and attack aircraft. Following accidents aboard USS Oriskany in 1966 and Forrestal in 1967, NWEF applied nuclear safety protocols to develop procedures to safely stow, handle, transport, assemble, disassemble, preload, load, unload, arm, dearm, rearm, and deliver non-nuclear aviation ordnance including bombs, torpedoes, naval mines, missiles and conventional stores from sonobuoys to Air-Delivered Seismic Intrusion Detectors (ADSID).

In 1959, because AFSWP was redesignated the Defense Atomic Support Agency (DASA), the Sandia Base was designated Headquarters Field Command, DASA. Over the next dozen years, Field Command was headed by Army, Navy, and Air Force officers.

Sandia Base personnel were dispatched to assist in two major incidents involving the loss and recovery of nuclear weapons in the 1960s. In 1966, a Boeing B-52 Stratofortress bomber and a Boeing KC-135 Stratotanker air refueling plane collided in mid-air over the Mediterranean Sea off the coast of Spain. This event is referred to as the Palomares incident. Three of four missing nuclear weapons were found on land near the fishing village of Palomares in Spain. The fourth was found in the sea after a lengthy search. The second incident occurred in 1968 when a B-52 bomber crashed near Thule, Greenland. Three weapons were recovered; a fourth is believed to remain in the ocean.

Always on the itinerary of key political figures, Sandia Base hosted President John F. Kennedy on December 7, 1962. On April 17, 1966, Vice President Hubert H. Humphrey toured facilities at Sandia Base.

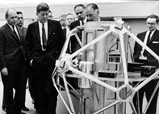
President Kennedy inspects a satellite that detects atmospheric atomic tests during his December 7, 1962, visit to Sandia Base.

In 1971, DASA was redesignated Defense Nuclear Agency. The field activities remained at Sandia Base, which was merged into Kirtland Air Force Base. Defense Nuclear Agency returned to its roots by being renamed Defense Special Weapons Agency (DSWA) without further change of mission or functions in 1996. DSWA was abolished, effective October 1, 1998, with functions transferred to the newly established Defense Threat Reduction Agency (DTRA).

== Sandia National Laboratories ==
After the move to Sandia Base, Los Alamos Laboratory's Z Division grew to almost 500 people, and became a separate branch of Los Alamos on April 1, 1948. Named Sandia Laboratory, the organization continued to grow to approximately 1000 employees by mid-1948.

The University of California, long-time manager of Los Alamos, indicated that it no longer desired to be involved in the engineering part of nuclear weapons development. Thus, in 1949, AT&T's manufacturing arm, Western Electric, accepted the management role on a no-profit, no-fee basis. Sandia Corporation, a wholly owned subsidiary of Western Electric, was formed to manage the lab. AT&T maintained the contract until 1993 when Martin Marietta (now Lockheed Martin) took over. The largest organization at Sandia Base, it became Sandia National Laboratories in 1979. It now operates facilities in Albuquerque and Livermore, California. The organization continues to expand into new areas of research, such as renewable energy sources.

== Manzano Base ==
In August, 1947, the Denver Post ran a story that claimed the military was building a secret base consisting of huge caverns for atomic weapons defense purposes. The Post said the new base was in the Manzano Mountains southeast of Sandia Base. The military responded by issuing a statement that operations and construction near Sandia Base were top-secret. In fact, however, the AFSWP was building one of several bases around the country that would be used for nuclear weapons storage. The AFSWP code-named the base "Site Able."

Construction of Site Able was delayed by a strike in which laborers demanded a 25-cent per hour increase in their minimum wage of $1.75 per hour.

On February 22, 1952, the now-completed Site Able was renamed Manzano Base and turned over to the operational control of the Air Force. The Denver Post story apparently was correct insofar as it described the general nature of the base. What appeared to be secure bunkers were visible to people (mostly military personnel) who went to a recreational camping area nearby known as Coyote Canyon. The military, however, never officially confirmed the nature of the activities at Manzano Base. At one point, a military spokesman said that Manzano Base had nothing to do with Sandia Base. Manzano has since been identified as the first of six original National Stockpile Sites (NSS) (for nuclear weapons). The other original NSS installations similar to Manzano were: Site Baker at Killeen Base, adjacent to Gray Air Force Base and Fort Hood, Texas; Site Charlie at Campbell Air Force Base and adjacent to Fort Campbell (Tennessee and Kentucky); Site Dog at Bossier Base, adjacent to Barksdale Air Force Base, Louisiana; Lake Mead Base, adjacent to Nellis Air Force Base, Nevada; and Medina Base, adjacent to Lackland Air Force Base, Texas.

On July 1, 1971, Manzano Base was merged, along with Sandia Base, into Kirtland Air Force Base.

== Other incidents at Sandia Base ==
On March 8, 1950, a fire of undetermined origin swept through the stockade at Sandia Base, killing fourteen prisoners. Several officers and military firefighters were seriously injured.

On May 22, 1957, a B-36 ferrying a nuclear weapon from Biggs AFB to Kirtland AFB dropped a nuclear weapon on approach to Kirtland AFB. The weapon impacted the ground 4.5 miles south of the Kirtland control tower and 0.3 miles west of the Sandia Base reservation. The weapon was completely destroyed by the detonation of its high explosive material, creating a crater 12 feet deep and 25 feet in diameter. Radioactive contamination at the crater lip amounted to 0.5 milliroentgen.

== The Sandia Base community ==
Because of the presence of the Armed Forces Special Weapons Project and its successors, Sandia Base had military personnel of all of the services, as well as Department of Defense civilian employees. Sandia Lab brought more civilians to the base community.

Although most of the base was restricted, the rest of the base resembled other U.S. military installations in the world. By the 1950s, there were places for several thousand military family members to live, shop, attend school, recreate, and worship. The Army was in charge of running these parts of the base.

Housing for military families existed in three areas of Sandia Base. In the southwest corner of the base was an area of Wherry housing, known as Zia Park. On the northwest side of the base was an area of Capehart housing, known as Pershing Park. This area stretched from Wyoming Boulevard almost to the Gibson Avenue gate. East of Wyoming Boulevard was an area of Capehart housing, known informally as "The Loops," because the streets were circular and had names such as 10th Loop, 11th Loop, etc.

Zia Park was once thought to house chemical warfare training; however, the only evidence suggesting chemical warfare training as reported by Kirtland AFB personnel is an old hand drawn map identifying this area as a chemical warfare training area. No other recorded maps have identified this area as a chemical training area, so the exact history of this site is in question. KAFB personnel thought this site was used during WWII, as a possible tear gas training site.

There were two schools on the base. Sandia Base Elementary School was on Wyoming Boulevard between Pershing Park and the Loops; Wherry Elementary School was located in Zia Park. Both schools were, and still are, operated by the Albuquerque Public Schools system. Older children from Sandia Base attended Van Buren Junior High School, just outside the base, and Highland High School in southeast Albuquerque.

Sandia Base had an officers club, an NCO club, a commissary, a base exchange, a movie theater, a swimming pool, a library, and a teen club. Sandia Base also had a club for civilian employees. There were two chapels, a hospital, and a pre-school on the base.

== Merger with Kirtland Air Force Base ==
On July 1, 1971, Sandia Base and Manzano Base were merged into Kirtland Air Force Base, their neighbor to the west. The merger was concurrent with the change of DASA into the Defense Nuclear Agency. The Air Force took over host responsibilities for the nation's military nuclear weapons program.
