= WWD =

WWD may refer to:

- Cape May Airport, in New Jersey, United States
- Westward Airways (Nebraska), a defunct American airline
- Wildwood (Amtrak station), in Florida, United States
- Women's Wear Daily, a fashion-industry trade journal
- Woolwich Dockyard railway station, in London
- World Water Day, an annual observance day about freshwater
- World Wetlands Day, an annual observance day about wetlands
- Wrong-way driving, the act of driving a motor vehicle against the direction of traffic
- Walking with Dinosaurs, a documentary television miniseries
