= KAXX =

KAXX may be:

- KVNT - (1020 AM) is an American commercial radio station in Eagle River, Alaska
- KAXX-LD - A television station in San Antonio, Texas
- Angel Fire Airport in Angel Fire, New Mexico
