= Advanced Air =

Airline of the United States

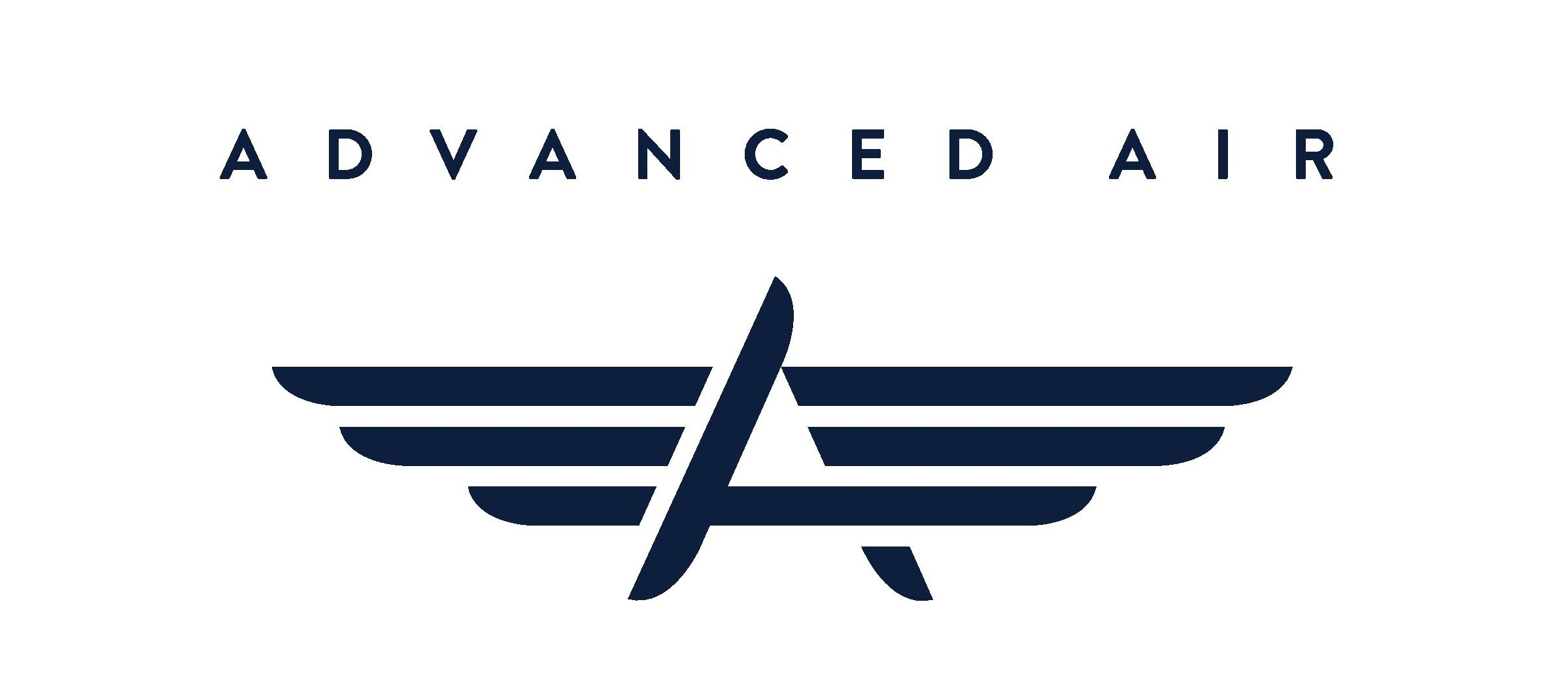
IATA	ICAO	Call sign
AN	WSN	WINGSPAN
- Founded: 2005
- Commenced operations: 2018
- AOC #: 19AA699L
- Operating bases: Hawthorne Municipal Airport, Phoenix
- Subsidiaries: Jet Center Los Angeles
- Fleet size: 18
- Destinations: 10
- Headquarters: Hawthorne, California
- Key people: Levi Stockton (President)
- Website: advancedairlines.com jetcenterla.com

Advanced Air is an American scheduled commuter and private charter airline based in Hawthorne, California, at the Hawthorne Municipal Airport, where it also owns a fixed base operator, Jet Center Los Angeles.

== History ==
Advanced Air was founded in 2005 and began scheduled shuttle service in 2015. It won its first Essential Air Service contract for Silver City, New Mexico, in October 2018 and began service in January 2019. In 2021, the company received a second Essential Air Service (EAS) contract for Merced, California. In 2022, subsidized contracts through the state of New Mexico were received to serve Gallup, New Mexico from Phoenix and Las Cruces, New Mexico from Albuquerque. The Gallup service began on August 1, 2022, and Las Cruces on January 16, 2023. An additional EAS contract was received in 2023 to serve Carlsbad, New Mexico from both Albuquerque and Phoenix. This service began on November 5, 2023, and ended on February 28, 2026. A fourth EAS contract was received to serve Crescent City, California and flights began on March 17, 2024, to both Oakland and Hawthorne, California.

In the early 2020s Advanced Air offered select California shuttle routes in partnership with Surf Air. Surf Air managed the membership program while Advanced owned and operated the aircraft in the Surf Air livery. All partner flights were operated on the Pilatus PC-12. This service is now partnered between Surf Air and Southern Airways Express.

In December 2019, Advanced Air began operating two Dornier 328JETs owned by the Taos Ski Valley and flown under the name Taos Air. Advanced Air operated flights during the 2019–20 winter season from Taos, New Mexico to Austin and Dallas, Texas as well as Hawthorne and Carlsbad, California. Due to the COVID-19 pandemic, service was suspended for the 2020–21 ski season but resumed for the summer months of 2021 and 2022 as well as the 2021–22 winter ski season. Service to Taos was then replaced by JSX Air beginning with the 2022–23 ski season. Advanced Air then acquired its own Dornier 328JET and began flights to Mammoth Mountain, California, from Burbank, Hawthorne, and Carlsbad for the 2021–22 ski season.

== Destinations ==
=== Scheduled commercial ===
City	Airport	IATA code	Destinations	Notes
Arizona
Phoenix	Sky Harbor International Airport	PHX	Gallup Silver City	Base
California
Carlsbad	McClellan–Palomar Airport	CLD	Mammoth Lakes	Seasonal
Crescent City	Del Norte County Airport	CEC	Hawthorne, CA Oakland, CA	EAS community Contract awarded from Contour Airlines
Hawthorne	Hawthorne Municipal Airport	HHR	Crescent City Mammoth Lakes (Seasonal)	Base
Mammoth Lakes	Mammoth Yosemite Airport	MMH	Carlsbad, CA Hawthorne, CA	Seasonal
Oakland	Oakland San Francisco Bay Airport	OAK	Crescent City	
New Mexico
Albuquerque	Albuquerque International Sunport	ABQ	Angel Fire (Seasonal) Silver City	
Angel Fire	Angel Fire Airport	AXX	Albuquerque	Seasonal | RASE Community
Gallup	Gallup Municipal Airport	GUP	Phoenix	RASE Community
Silver City	Grant County Airport	SVC	Albuquerque Phoenix	EAS community

=== Former destinations ===
City	Airport	IATA Code	Destinations	Notes
California
Burbank	Hollywood Burbank Airport	BUR	Mammoth Lakes	Seasonal
Los Angeles	Los Angeles International Airport	LAX	Merced	
Merced	Merced Regional Airport	MCE	Las Vegas Los Angeles Hawthorne	EAS community Service to end June 30, 2026, replaced by Contour Airlines.
Thermal	Jacqueline Cochran Regional Airport	TRM	Hawthorne, CA	
Nevada
Pahrump	Calvada Meadows Airport	74P	Hawthorne	
Las Vegas	Harry Reid International Airport	LAS	Gallup Merced	
New Mexico
Carlsbad	Cavern City Air Terminal	CNM	Albuquerque Phoenix	Contract awarded to Contour Airlines
Las Cruces	Las Cruces International Airport	LRU	Albuquerque	RASE Community
Taos	Taos Regional Airport	TSM	Austin-Executive Airport Dallas-Love Field Carlsbad, CA Hawthorne, CA	Seasonal | Branded as Taos Air
Texas
Austin	Austin Executive Airport	EDC	Taos	Seasonal | Branded as Taos Air
Dallas	Dallas Love Field	DAL	Taos	Seasonal | Branded as Taos Air

== Fleet ==
Advanced Air Fleet
Aircraft	In Fleet	Notes
Beechcraft King Air 350	10	
Bombardier Challenger 300	2	
Cessna CitationJet/M2	1	
Cessna Citation Sovereign	1	
Dornier 328JET	2	
Gulfstream GV-SP	1	
Pilatus PC-12	1	
Total	18	
