= Calvada Meadows Airport =

Airport in Pahrump, Nevada, US

- IATA: none; ICAO: none; FAA LID: 74P (formerly NV74)

Summary
- Airport type: Private
- Owner: Preferred Equities Corp.
- Operator: Director of Calvada Operation
- Serves: Pahrump
- Location: Pahrump, Nevada
- Elevation AMSL: 2,726 ft / 831 m
- Coordinates: 36°16′16″N 115°59′42″W
- Interactive map of Calvada Meadows Airport

Runways
Direction	Length		Surface
Direction	ft	m	Surface
15/33	5,200	1,585	Asphalt/gravel

Calvada Meadows Airport (FAA LID: 74P (formerly NV74)) is a private airport located in Pahrump, Nevada, United States. It was activated in July, 1987. There are no instrument approach procedures. Of the 5,200 ft (1,585 m) of runway, 4,000 ft (1,219 m) is asphalt; the rest is gravel. The airport had a limited time commercial service with Advanced Air service to Hawthorne in Los Angeles.

== Facilities and aircraft ==
Calvada Meadows airport has one runway (15/33), is 4081 x 48 feet and is made of asphalt. There is also one concrete helipad, 20 x 20 feet.

For the 12 month period ending September 30, 2019, the airport had approximately 131 operations per week: 96% general aviation, 3% military and less than 1% air taxi.

There are 54 aircraft based at the field: 41 single-engine, 5 multi-engine, 1 helicopter, 1 glider, and 6 ultralight.

== See also ==
- List of airports in Nevada
