= Grant County Airport (New Mexico) =

- IATA: SVC; ICAO: KSVC; FAA LID: SVC

Summary
- Airport type: Public
- Owner: Grant County
- Serves: Silver City, New Mexico
- Elevation AMSL: 5,446 ft (1,660 m)
- Coordinates: 32°38′12″N 108°09′23″W
- Website: SVC website

Map
- Location of airport in New Mexico / United States SVC (the United States)

Runways
Direction	Length		Surface
Direction	ft	m	Surface
8/26	6,802	2,073	Asphalt
17/35	5,473	1,668	Dirt
12/30	4,675	1,425	Dirt
3/21	4,537	1,383	Dirt

Statistics (2018)
- Aircraft operations: 5,675
- Based aircraft: 26
- Source: Federal Aviation Administration

Grant County Airport (IATA: SVC, ICAO: KSVC, FAA LID: SVC) is a county-owned, public-use airport in Grant County, New Mexico, United States. It is located 10 nautical miles (12 mi, 19 km) southeast of the central business district of Silver City, New Mexico. The airport is mostly used for general aviation, but is also served by one commercial airline. Service is subsidized by the Essential Air Service program.

It is included in the National Plan of Integrated Airport Systems for 2011–2015, which categorized it as a non-primary commercial service airport (between 2,500 and 10,000 enplanements per year).

== Facilities and aircraft ==
Grant County Airport covers an area of 740 acres (299 ha) at an elevation of 5,446 feet (1,660 m) above mean sea level. It has four runways, including one asphalt paved runway 8/26 measuring 6,802 by 100 feet (2,073 by 30 m). The remaining three runways have dirt surfaces: 17/35 is 5,473 by 75 feet (1,668 by 23 m), 12/30 is 4,675 by 75 feet (1,425 by 23 m), and 3/21 is 4,537 by 80 feet (1,383 by 24 m).

For the 12-month period ending December 31, 2018, the airport had 5,675 aircraft operations, an average of 16 per day: 63% general aviation, 22% scheduled commercial, <1% air taxi, and <1% military. At that time there were 26 aircraft based at this airport: 81% single-engine, 15% multi-engine, and <1% helicopter.

In 2020 the terminal building, named for David D, Diaz, underwent an expansion and rehabilitation.

== Airline and destinations ==
Airlines	Destinations	Refs
Advanced Air	Albuquerque, Phoenix–Sky Harbor	

Advanced Air operates Raytheon King Air 350 turboprop aircraft on all flights. The aircraft has eight seats arranged in an executive configuration.

=== Historical airline service ===
The Grant County Airport was dedicated on November 30, 1951, serving the communities of Silver City, Hurley, Lordsburg, and Deming, New Mexico, as well as smaller communities in the so-called "Mining District," including Arenas Valley, Fort Bayard, Central (now Santa Clara), Bayard, and Santa Rita. The next day, on December 1, 1951 Frontier Airlines began operating flights from the airport as a stop on their route from El Paso to Phoenix, which also included stops at Clifton, Safford, and Tucson, Arizona. Before the opening of the Grant County Airport, the airline was serving local airports in Deming, NM and Lordsburg, NM; however, service to those cities was then discontinued. By 1956 the route to Phoenix was modified to originate in Albuquerque rather than El Paso and service to Clifton and Safford was later discontinued which made for nonstop flights from Silver City to Tucson and Phoenix. At that time and on into the mid-1960s, the airline was flying the Douglas DC-3. Later, Frontier served the airport with larger Convair 340 prop aircraft followed by Convair 580 turboprops. Frontier's flights to Tucson and Phoenix were discontinued in 1974 and a small commuter carrier, Zia Airlines, began flights to Albuquerque with Cessna 402 and Handley Page Jetstream propjets in 1976. In the midst of growing into an all jet airline, Frontier ended their service in late 1979. Zia Airlines went out of business in early 1980 and Air Midwest began operating later that year under an Essential Air Service (EAS) contract with flights to Albuquerque using Swearingen Metroliner aircraft. Another commuter, Airways of New Mexico, operated flights to El Paso for a short time in 1980 as well. In 1985 the EAS contract was shifted from Air Midwest to Mesa Airlines which came to Silver City with service to Albuquerque using Beechcraft 99 and Beechcraft 1900D. Mesa's flights continued for 20 years until 2005 when the EAS contract was awarded to Great Lakes Airlines. Great Lakes started service with flights to Albuquerque, also using Beech 1900D's, but switched the flights to Phoenix in late 2012. Great Lakes ended all service in late 2014 and the EAS contract was then awarded to Boutique Air which began service in early 2015. Boutique provided flights to both Albuquerque and Phoenix using Pilatus PC-12 aircraft for four years until the EAS contract was then transferred to Advanced Air. Advanced Air began service in early 2019 with similar service to Albuquerque and Phoenix but uses a larger, multi engine, Beechcraft Super King Air model 350. Two other commuter airlines that served the Silver City to El Paso market for short periods were Aztec Airlines in 1966 and Turner Air in 1985.

== Statistics ==
Top domestic destinations (August 2024 - July 2025)
Rank	City	Airport name & IATA code	Passengers
1	Albuquerque, NM	Albuquerque International Sunport (ABQ)	4,380
2	Phoenix, AZ	Phoenix-Sky Harbor (PHX)	2,330

Passenger boardings (enplanements) by year, as per the FAA
Year	2009	2010	2011	2012	2013	2014	2015	2016	2017	2018	2019	2020	2021	2022	2023
Enplanements	1,860	1,501	1,609	1,363	1,670	1,128	3,945	5,442	5,686	5,949	5,968	2,717	4,726	6,340	6,671
Change	▼28.65%	▼19.30%	▲7.20%	▼15.29%	▲22.52%	▼32.46%	▲249.73%	▲37.95%	▲4.48%	▲4.63%	▲0.32%	▼54.47%	▲73.94%	▲34.15%	▲5.22%
Airline	Great Lakes Airlines	Great Lakes Airlines	Great Lakes Airlines	Great Lakes Airlines	Great Lakes Airlines	Great Lakes Airlines	Boutique Air	Boutique Air	Boutique Air	Boutique Air	Advanced Air	Advanced Air	Advanced Air	Advanced Air	Advanced Air
Destination(s)	Albuquerque	Albuquerque	Albuquerque	Albuquerque	Phoenix	Phoenix	Albuquerque	Albuquerque Phoenix	Albuquerque Phoenix	Albuquerque Phoenix	Albuquerque Phoenix	Albuquerque Phoenix	Albuquerque Phoenix	Albuquerque Phoenix	Albuquerque Phoenix

== Other sources ==
- Essential Air Service documents (Docket OST-1996-1903) from the U.S. Department of Transportation:
  - Order 2004-12-21 (December 29, 2004): selecting Great Lakes Aviation, Ltd., to provide essential air service with 19-passenger Beech B1900D aircraft at Clovis and Silver City/Hurley/Deming, New Mexico, for two years at a combined annual subsidy rate of $1,718,113.
  - Order 2007-3-18 (March 20, 2007): selecting Great Lakes Aviation, Ltd. to provide subsidized essential air service (EAS) at Clovis and Silver City/Hurley/Deming, New Mexico, for two years, beginning May 1, 2007, through April 30, 2009. Clovis will receive 18 one-stop round trips per week to Denver at an annual subsidy of $999,932. Silver City/Hurley/Deming will receive 12 nonstop weekly round trips to Phoenix at an annual subsidy of $992,799. Both communities will be served with 19-passenger Beech 1900 aircraft. The total combined annual subsidy is $1,992,731.
  - Order 2007-4-5 (April 4, 2007): the department is granting the motion of Grant County, New Mexico, to file a petition for reconsideration of Order 2007-3-18, issued March 20, 2007, and, upon review, deciding to vacate the earlier decision and resolicit Essential Air Service proposals.
  - Order 2007-5-19 (May 31, 2007): selecting Great Lakes Aviation, Ltd. to provide subsidized essential air service (EAS) at Clovis and Silver City/Hurley/Deming, New Mexico, for two years, beginning May 1, 2007, through April 30, 2009. Clovis and Silver City/Hurley/Deming each will receive 12 nonstop round trips per week to Albuquerque with 19-passenger Beechcraft 1900D aircraft at an annual combined subsidy of $2,365,290.
  - Order 2009-3-3 (March 6, 2009): re-selecting Great Lakes Aviation, Ltd. to provide essential air service (EAS) at Clovis and Silver City/Hurley/Deming, New Mexico, at a combined annual subsidy rate of $2,959,451 ($1,517,277 for Clovis and $1,442,174 for Silver City), for the two-year period from May 1, 2009, through April 30, 2011.
  - Order 2011-4-19 (April 22, 2011): reselects Great Lakes Aviation, Ltd., to provide subsidized EAS with 19-passenger Beechcraft B-1900D aircraft at Clovis and Silver City/Hurley/Deming, New Mexico (Silver City), for the period from May 1, 2011, to May 31, 2013, at a combined annual subsidy rate of $3,186,249.
  - Ninety-Day Notice (June 4, 2012) of Great Lakes Aviation, Ltd. serving notice of intent to terminate scheduled air service to·Clovis, New Mexico and Silver City/Hurley/Deming, New Mexico from Albuquerque, New Mexico effective September 3, 2012.
