= Ricardo Chavez Ortiz =

Mexican American activist

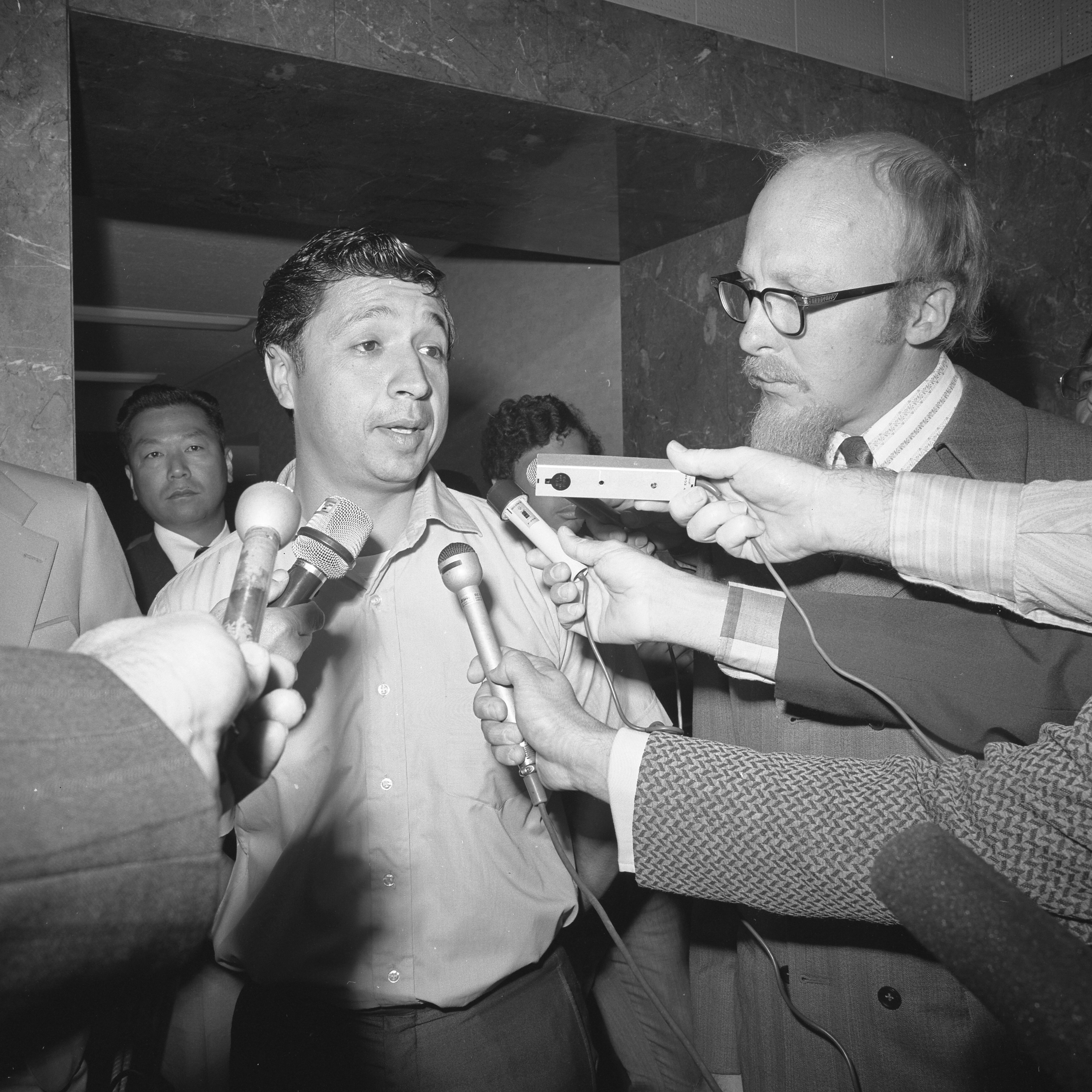
- Mexican American activist Ricardo Chavez Ortiz talking with reporters
- Born: September 19, 1933; Tingüindín, Michoacán, Mexico
- Died: December 21, 2021 (aged 88); Zamora, Michoacán, Mexico
- Known for: Hijacking of Frontier Airlines Flight 91

Ricardo Chavez Ortiz (1933–2021) was a Mexican American activist who was best known for the hijacking of Frontier Airlines Flight 91. After taking control of the aircraft with an unloaded gun, he demanded the plane to be rerouted to Los Angeles, California. It was there that he demanded airtime on the news to protest the abuse of his children and also Mexican-Americans at the hands of the American government. After holding the passengers and crew as hostages on the plane, he eventually let them go and peacefully surrendered.

== Hijacking ==
Chavez Ortiz boarded Frontier Airlines Flight 91 on April 13, 1972 in Albuquerque, New Mexico. He was briefly detained by Frontier Airlines staff for fitting the FBI profile of a hijacker but was let go without incident. Ricardo then boarded the aircraft with an unloaded .22 caliber pistol and took control of the aircraft just over Socorro, New Mexico. He then ordered the aircraft to land in Los Angeles, and also demanded that he be given airtime on the radio to air his grievances over the injustices that Mexican-Americans face in the United States. After landing at Los Angeles International Airport, he allowed the 27 passengers onboard the plane to leave, while keeping the crew onboard. He then allowed news reporters and camera crew onboard, and then gave a two-hour long interview to the press where he discussed issues that were plaguing the Chicano and Mexican communities.

After finishing his interview with reporters, he handed his gun along with ammunition clips to the pilot and surrendered to the pilot.

== Prosecution and later life ==
Chavez Ortiz was charged with hijacking and held with a $500,000 bond. He was sentenced to a life sentence in prison, later reduced to 20 years on appeal. After serving his time, he chose to be deported to Mexico, leaving his family in the United States. He died in the outskirts of Zamora, Michoacán, on December 21, 2021.
