= Frontier Airlines (1950–1986) =

Airline of the United States (1950–1986)

IATA	ICAO	Call sign
FL	—	FRONTIER
- Founded: June 1, 1950
- Ceased operations: August 24, 1986
- Hubs: ATW Denver–Stapleton
- Focus cities: Dallas/Fort Worth; Kansas City; Salt Lake City; St. Louis
- Parent company: Goldfield Corp. (1962–1965); RKO General (1965–1985); People Express Airlines (1985–1986)
- Headquarters: Denver, Colorado, U.S.
- Key people: Ray Wilson; Hal Darr; Bud Maytag; Lew Dymond; Al Feldman; Glen Ryland

Frontier Airlines was a local service carrier, a scheduled airline in the United States that was formed by the merger of Arizona Airways, Challenger Airlines, and Monarch Air Lines on June 1, 1950. Headquartered at the now-closed Stapleton International Airport in Denver, Colorado, the airline ceased operations on August 24, 1986. A new airline using the same name was founded eight years later in 1994.

== History ==
The original Frontier Airlines dates to November 27, 1946, when Monarch Air Lines began service in the Four Corners states of Colorado, Utah, New Mexico, and Arizona. Frontier served cities in the Rocky Mountains bounded by Salt Lake City to the west, Billings to the north, Denver to the east, and Phoenix and El Paso to the south.

In 1950, it flew to 40 cities in the Rocky Mountain region with twelve Douglas DC-3s and 400 employees. Before ceasing operations in 1986, it flew to more than 170 airports at various times over the years, with service to both the U.S. east coast and west coast as well as to Canada and Mexico with an all-jet fleet.

Revenue Passenger-Miles (Millions); scheduled flights only
	Frontier	Central
1951	27	5
1955	46	15
1960	88	32
1965	217	91
1970	1022	merged 1967
1975	1455	merged 1967

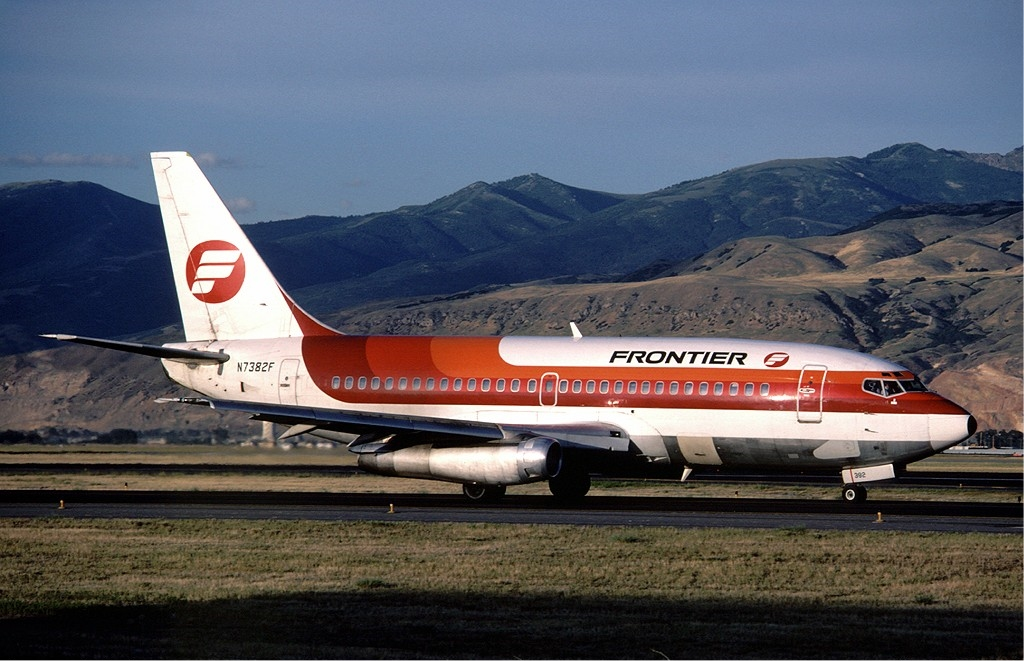
Frontier Airlines livery in 1983; Boeing 737-200 N7382F

Frontier continued to operate Douglas DC-3s and added Convair CV-340s beginning in 1959; the company introduced a new logo on the new aircraft. On June 1, 1964, it was the first airline to fly the Convair 580, a CV-340/440 retrofitted with GM Allison turboprops. It had 50 seats, was flown by two pilots and carried one flight attendant. (The aircraft could have carried 53 passengers, but that would have required a second flight attendant.) The CV-580 was the workhorse of the Frontier fleet until the introduction of the Boeing 737-200s in the early 1970s. In later years de Havilland Canada DHC-6 Twin Otters and Beech 99s were added to serve cities too small for the Convair 580.

In May 1958, Frontier flew to 40 airports; two years later it flew to 69. Half the additions had never seen an airline and several never would again, after Frontier pulled out. In May 1968, after merging with Central Airlines, Frontier flew to 100 airports, second among U.S. airlines (Pan Am was first with 122).

In April 1958, Lewis Bergman "Bud" Maytag, Jr. (grandson of Frederick Louis Maytag I, founder of the Maytag Corporation), acquired controlling interest in Frontier. After all governmental approvals, he took control in January 1959 as chairman of the board and president. Three years later, Maytag sold his stock in March 1962 to the Goldfield Corp., whereupon he bought a controlling interest in National Airlines. Lewis W. Dymond then became president of Frontier and, under his guidance, the airline entered the jet age with new Boeing 727-100s on September 30, 1966. The Boeing trijet was called the "Arrow-Jet" by the airline. The Boeing 727-200 became part of the fleet in February 1968.

On October 1, 1967, Frontier purchased Central Airlines, headquartered in Fort Worth, Texas. The addition of Central added eleven Convair 600s and sixteen DC-3s to the fleet and many new cities. Convair 600s were Convair 240s that had been retrofitted with Rolls-Royce Dart turboprop engines; Frontier phased out the Convair 600s in 1969–70 and DC-3 flights ended in 1968. The Convair 580s lasted until May 31, 1982, when they were parked and eventually sold.

Alvin Feldman became president in March 1971 and converted the jet fleet to Boeing 737-200s, eliminating the 727s. The 737-200 then became Frontier's only mainline jet type until McDonnell Douglas MD-80s were added beginning May 20, 1982.

On January 29, 1973, Frontier Airlines hired its first black pilot, Bob Ashby, the only Tuskegee Airman to become a commercial passenger airline pilot. It also hired the first female pilot for any modern day U.S. commercial airline the same day, Emily Howell Warner. Both were awarded their captain's wings several years later.

According to the 1977 Frontier Airlines annual report, the airline was serving both Burbank (BUR) and Orange County (SNA) via an interchange flight agreement with Hughes Airwest with service between these southern California destinations and the Frontier hub in Denver (DEN) and had also begun serving Sacramento (SMF), its first directly served destination in California, that same year. Frontier would later introduce its own Orange County service as well as flights to a number of other destinations in California. This same annual report states the airline transported over 80 percent of its passenger traffic on board its growing fleet of Boeing 737-200 jets in 1977.

During the 1970s, Frontier promoted its "first class legroom at coach prices" as well as what it claimed was elevated on board meal service via a series of print advertisements.

The final Frontier logo, a stylized "F", was created by Saul Bass and introduced April 30, 1978. By 1979, the airline had 5,100 employees and operated 35 Boeing 737-200 and 25 Convair 580 aircraft serving 94 cities in 26 states, Canada and Mexico.

=== Decline ===
On February 1, 1980, Frontier president Al Feldman left to become the CEO of Continental Airlines. He was succeeded by Glen Ryland, and the airline started to decline. By 1982, employees began accepting lower wages and benefits in an effort to keep the business viable. Ryland resigned November 6, 1984, and was replaced by M.C. "Hank" Lund, the well-known vice president. Joe O'Gorman, from United Airlines, took over in May 1985, giving rise to speculation that United would buy Frontier.

Once the last of the Convair 580 turboprops were retired, Frontier became an all-jet airline on June 1, 1982. The airline operated Boeing 737-200s to smaller cities such as Casper, Wyoming; Durango, Colorado; Farmington, New Mexico; Fort Smith, Arkansas; Grand Forks, North Dakota; Lawton, Oklahoma; Manhattan, Kansas; Montrose, Colorado; Rock Springs, Wyoming; Salina, Kansas; Scottsbluff, Nebraska; Stockton, California; Topeka, Kansas; and West Yellowstone, Montana. By the fall of 1983 some Convair 580's were revived when an agreement was made with Combs Airways to operate a code sharing feeder service for Frontier called Frontier Commuter. This carrier began service on October 17, 1983, to some of the Frontier cities that were too small to support 737s plus new service to several cities such as Idaho Falls and Pocatello, Idaho, Gillette and Sheridan, Wyoming, and Pierre and Aberdeen, South Dakota. Frontier Commuter was short lived and shut down on January 14, 1985.

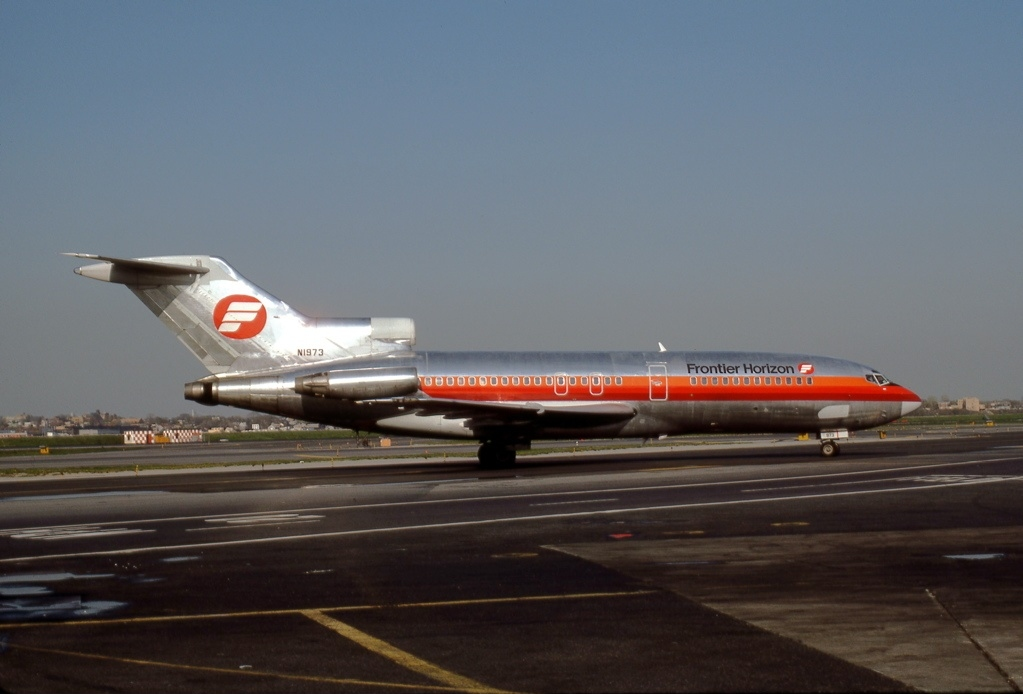
Frontier Horizon 727-100 at New York LaGuardia April 1984

In January 1984 Boeing 727-100s made a short-lived reappearance when Frontier created a wholly owned "airline within an airline" low cost subsidiary: Frontier Horizon. It was founded as a low-cost, non-union subsidiary of the original Frontier Airlines. Its formation was bitterly opposed by Frontier Airlines employees. During its brief existence, Boeing 727s formerly operated by American Airlines flew nonstop between Denver and New York LaGuardia Airport (LGA), Washington Dulles International Airport (IAD), Chicago O'Hare International Airport (ORD), San Francisco International Airport (SFO), Orlando (MCO) and Tampa (TPA). Frontier Horizon ceased operations in April 1985 after it was acquired by a new start up air carrier, Skybus Airlines, that same year.

The Frontier employees' union coalition struggled to save Frontier Airlines, but failed. People Express Airlines acquired Frontier on October 5, 1985, and put Larry Martin in charge after Joe O'Gorman resigned on January 29, 1986. People Express continued operating Frontier as an independent entity. On August 24, 1986, Frontier shut down due to continued losses and four days later filed for bankruptcy.

On October 24, 1986 Continental Airlines, a Texas Air Corp. unit, acquired People Express Airlines which had acquired Frontier Airlines the year before. Both merged into Continental on February 1, 1987, along with New York Air and several commuter airline subsidiaries including Britt Airways and Provincetown-Boston Airlines (PBA). Frontier's failure doomed People Express, New York Air, and several commuter air carriers. It would take years to settle the pension disputes and lawsuits. Efforts were still being made in 2013 to settle ESOP accounts. Continental continued to operate the Frontier jet fleet with the aircraft being repainted in Continental's livery. On March 3, 2012, Continental merged into United Airlines.

Frontier's last timetable was dated September 3, 1986; the airline had halted operations and filed bankruptcy the week before. Some bankruptcy proceedings ended on May 31, 1990, forty years after Frontier was formed, but the Chapter 11 case was closed July 22, 1998, by Charles E. Matheson, Chief Judge.

M. C. "Hank" Lund and other former Frontier executives went on to start a new airline, also named Frontier Airlines, which began Boeing 737 flights on July 5, 1994.

During its 36 years, Frontier Airlines flew to over 170 airports; however, not all were served at the same time and many no longer have airline service.

== Fleet ==
Frontier operated the following aircraft types at the various times during its existence:

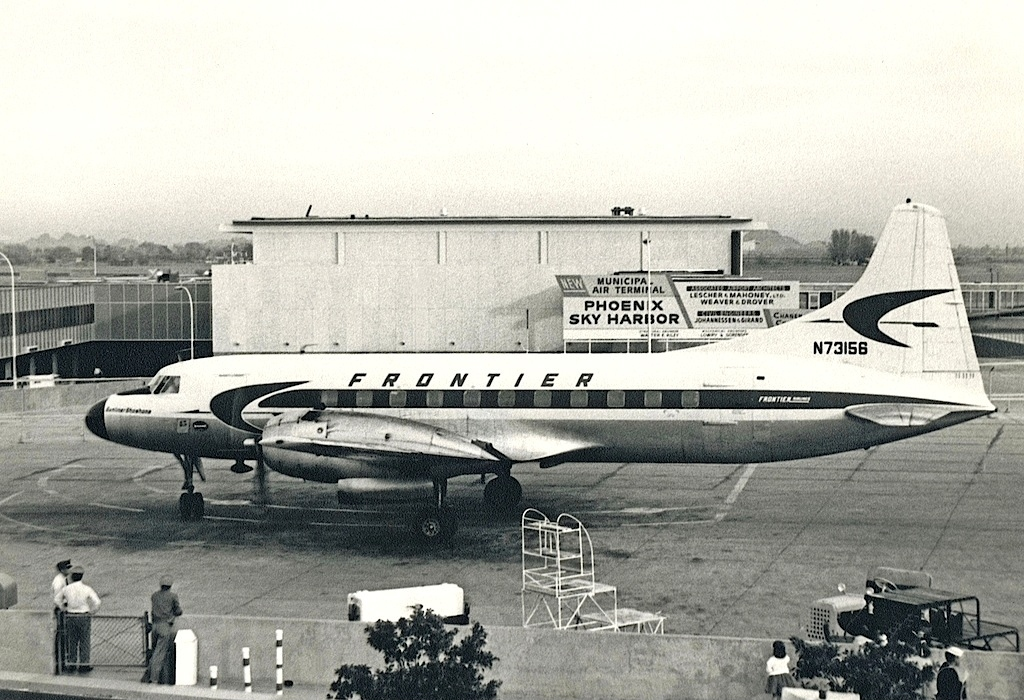
Frontier Airlines Convair 340

- Beech 99
- Boeing 727-100
- Boeing 727-200
- Boeing 737-200
- Convair 340
- Convair 440
- Convair 580
- Convair 600 (formerly operated by Central Airlines)
- de Havilland Canada DHC-6 Twin Otter
- Douglas DC-3
- McDonnell Douglas MD-80

According to the July 1, 1968 Frontier Airlines system timetable, Aero Commander 500 twin engine prop aircraft were being operated via contract by Combs Aviation on behalf of Frontier on scheduled passenger flights serving smaller communities in Montana and Wyoming at this time.

Frontier was operating only two mainline jet aircraft types prior to being merged into Continental Airlines being the Boeing 737-200 and the McDonnell Douglas MD-80.

== Destinations ==
Frontier served the following destinations between 1950 and 1986 with not all of these destinations being served at the same time. Destinations in bold received jet service.

=== Arizona ===
- Clifton
- Douglas/Bisbee
- Flagstaff
- Nogales
- **Phoenix** — Phoenix Sky Harbor International Airport
- Prescott
- Safford
- **Tucson** — Tucson International Airport
- Winslow

=== Arkansas ===
- **Fayetteville**
- **Fort Smith**
- Harrison
- Hot Springs
- **Little Rock** — Clinton National Airport

=== California ===
- **Burbank** — Hollywood Burbank Airport (served via an interchange flight agreement with Hughes Airwest)
- **Fresno** — Fresno Yosemite International Airport
- **Los Angeles** — Los Angeles International Airport
- **Oakland** — Oakland International Airport
- **Orange County/Santa Ana** — John Wayne Airport
- **Palm Springs** – Palm Springs International Airport
- **Redding**
- **Sacramento**
- **San Diego** — San Diego International Airport
- **San Francisco** — San Francisco International Airport
- **Stockton**

=== Colorado ===
- Alamosa
- Canon City
- **Colorado Springs** — City of Colorado Springs Municipal Airport
- Cortez
- **Denver** — Stapleton International Airport - **Primary Hub**
- **Durango**
- **Grand Junction**
- Greeley
- Gunnison
- Hayden/Steamboat Springs – Yampa Valley Regional Airport
- Lamar
- Monte Vista
- **Montrose**
- **Pueblo** — Pueblo Memorial Airport

=== District of Columbia ===
- **Washington, D.C.** — Washington Dulles International Airport

=== Florida ===
- **Orlando** — Orlando International Airport
- **Tampa** — Tampa International Airport

=== Georgia ===
- **Atlanta** — Hartsfield–Jackson Atlanta International Airport

=== Idaho ===
- **Boise**
- Idaho Falls

=== Illinois ===
- **Chicago**
  - Chicago Midway International Airport
  - Chicago O'Hare International Airport
- **Rockford** — Chicago Rockford International Airport

=== Indiana ===
- **Indianapolis** — Indianapolis International Airport

=== Iowa ===
- **Des Moines**
- **Sioux City**

=== Kansas ===
- Dodge City
- Goodland
- Great Bend
- Hays
- Hutchinson
- Liberal
- **Manhattan** — Manhattan Regional Airport
- Parsons
- **Salina** — Salina Municipal Airport
- **Topeka** — Philip Billard Municipal Airport
- **Wichita** — Wichita Dwight D. Eisenhower National Airport

=== Kentucky ===
- **Lexington**

=== Louisiana ===
- **Shreveport**

=== Michigan ===
- **Detroit** — Detroit Metropolitan Wayne County Airport

=== Minnesota ===
- **Minneapolis/Saint Paul** — Minneapolis–Saint Paul International Airport

=== Mississippi ===
- **Jackson** — Jackson–Evers International Airport

=== Missouri ===
- Fort Leonard Wood
- **Joplin**
- **Kansas City**
  - Kansas City International Airport
  - Charles B. Wheeler Downtown Airport
- St. Joseph
- **St. Louis** — St. Louis Lambert International Airport
- **Springfield**

=== Montana ===
- **Billings**
- **Bozeman**
- Glasgow
- Glendive
- **Great Falls**
- Havre
- **Helena**
- **Kalispell**
- Lewistown
- Miles City
- **Missoula**
- Sidney
- **West Yellowstone**
- Wolf Point

=== Nebraska ===
- Ainsworth
- Alliance
- **Beatrice** — Beatrice Municipal Airport
- Chadron
- Columbus
- **Grand Island**
- Hastings
- Imperial
- Kearney
- **Lincoln**
- McCook
- Norfolk
- **North Platte**
- **Omaha**
- **Scottsbluff**
- Sidney
- Valentine

=== Nevada ===
- **Las Vegas** — Harry Reid International Airport
- **Reno** — Reno–Tahoe International Airport

=== New Mexico ===
- Alamogordo — Alamogordo Municipal Airport
- **Albuquerque** — Albuquerque International Sunport
- Deming
- **Farmington** — Four Corners Regional Airport
- Gallup — Gallup Municipal Airport
- Las Cruces — Las Cruces International Airport
- Lordsburg
- Santa Fe — Santa Fe Municipal Airport
- Silver City — Grant County Airport

=== New York ===
- **New York City** — LaGuardia Airport

=== North Dakota ===
- **Bismarck**
- Dickinson
- **Fargo** – Hector International Airport
- **Grand Forks**
- **Minot** – Minot International Airport
- Williston

=== Ohio ===
- **Columbus** — John Glenn Columbus International Airport
- **Toledo** — Toledo Express Airport

=== Oklahoma ===
- Bartlesville
- Duncan
- Enid
- Guymon
- **Lawton**
- Muskogee
- **Oklahoma City**
- Ponca City
- Stillwater
- **Tulsa**

=== Oregon ===
- **Eugene**
- **Portland** — Portland International Airport

=== South Dakota ===
- Lemmon
- **Rapid City**
- **Sioux Falls**

=== Tennessee ===
- **Memphis** — Memphis International Airport

=== Texas ===
- **Abilene**
- Amarillo
- Borger
- **Dallas/Fort Worth**
  - Dallas Love Field
  - Dallas Fort Worth International Airport
  - Greater Southwest International Airport (before 1974)
- **El Paso** — El Paso International Airport
- **Houston** — William P. Hobby Airport
- **Midland/Odessa**
- Paris

=== Utah ===
- Moab
- Price
- Provo
- **Salt Lake City** — Salt Lake City International Airport (**Focus City**)
- Vernal

=== Washington state ===
- **Pasco**
- **Seattle** — Seattle–Tacoma International Airport
- **Spokane**

=== Wisconsin ===
- **Green Bay**
- **Madison**
- **Milwaukee** — Milwaukee Mitchell International Airport

=== Wyoming ===
- **Casper**
- **Cheyenne**
- Cody
- Douglas
- Greybull
- **Jackson**
- **Laramie**
- Lusk
- Newcastle
- Powell
- Rawlins
- **Riverton**
- **Rock Springs**
- Worland

=== International ===
- **Guadalajara, Mexico**
- **Ixtapa/Zihuatanejo, Mexico**
- **Manzanillo, Mexico**
- **Mazatlán, Mexico**
- **Puerto Vallarta, Mexico**
- **Regina, Saskatchewan, Canada** — Regina International Airport
- **Saskatoon, Saskatchewan, Canada** — Saskatoon John G. Diefenbaker International Airport
- **Vancouver, British Columbia, Canada** — Vancouver International Airport
- **Winnipeg, Manitoba, Canada** — Winnipeg James Armstrong Richardson International Airport

The above are taken from Frontier timetables.

== Accidents and incidents ==
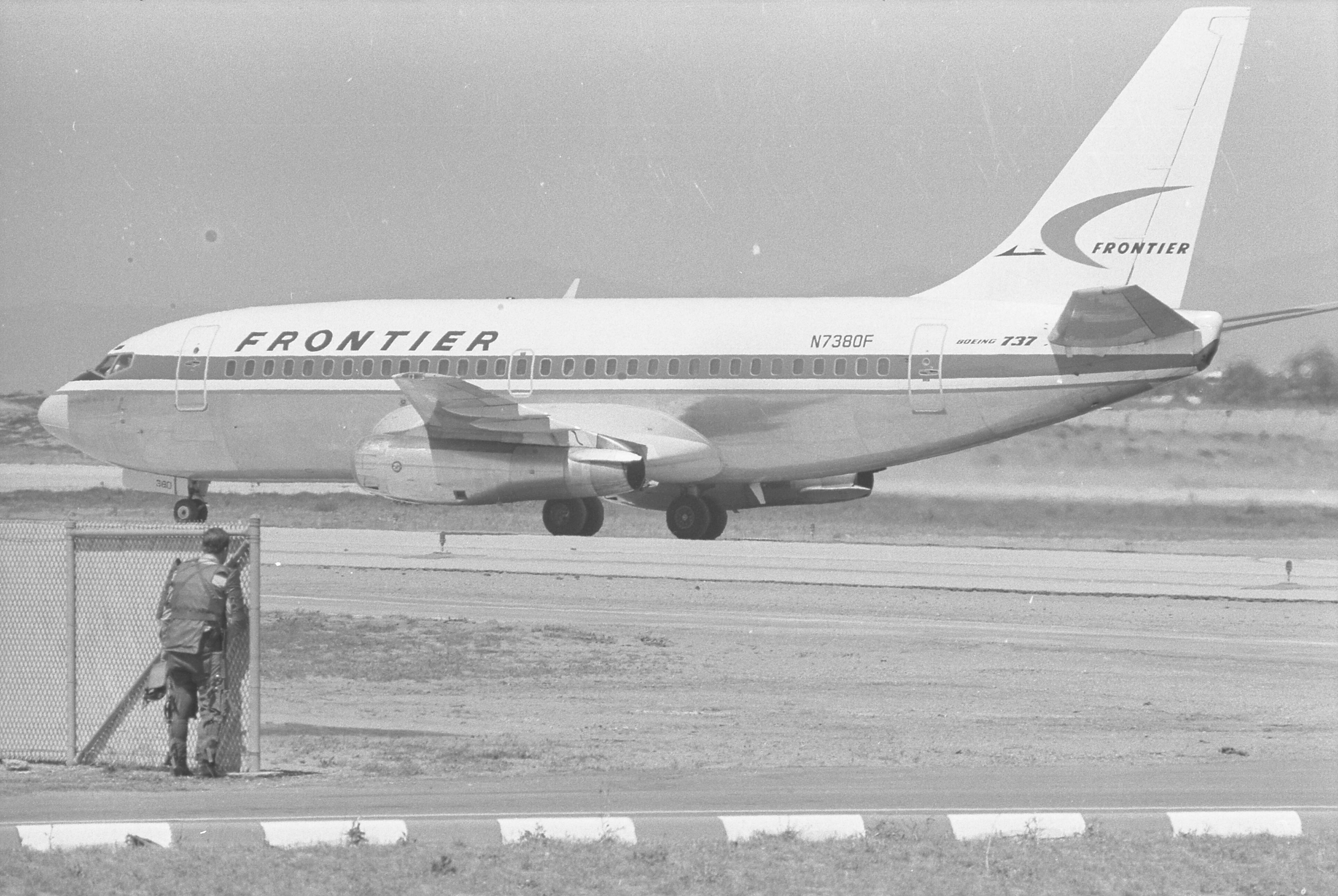
Frontier Airlines Flight 91 sitting on the runway in 1972.

- On April 21, 1957, Frontier Airlines Flight 7, a Douglas DC-3 on a flight from Prescott Regional Airport to Phoenix Sky Harbor International Airport descended and the left wing impacted the side of a mountain ridge at 6400 feet 64 km (40 miles) north of PHX. A portion of the left wing was torn off, but a safe landing was made at PHX. There were no fatalities among the 4 crew and 22 passengers on board. The aircraft was repaired and put back into service.
- On December 21, 1962, Frontier Airlines Flight 363, a Convair CV-340 touched down 4061 feet short of Runway 17 in fog at Central Nebraska Regional Airport. The aircraft caught fire but all 3 crew and 39 passengers survived.
- On March 12, 1964, Frontier Airlines Flight 32, a Douglas C-47, struck the crest of a 2615 foot high upslope (a few feet below airfield elevation) during a VOR approach to Runway 30 at Miles City Municipal Airport. There was a minimal ceiling, low visibility, icing, and high gusty winds. All 3 crew and 2 passengers were killed.
- On July 27, 1966, Frontier Airlines Flight 188, a Douglas C-47 bound for Albuquerque, New Mexico, swerved off the runway and ended up in a ditch at Gallup Municipal Airport. All 3 crew and 13 passengers survived, but the aircraft was damaged beyond repair and written off.
- On December 21, 1967, Frontier Airlines Flight 2610, a Douglas C-47 converted to carry cargo, crashed after takeoff from Stapleton International Airport due to the failure of the crew to perform a pre-takeoff control check resulting in takeoff with the elevators immobilized by a control batten. Both occupants were killed.

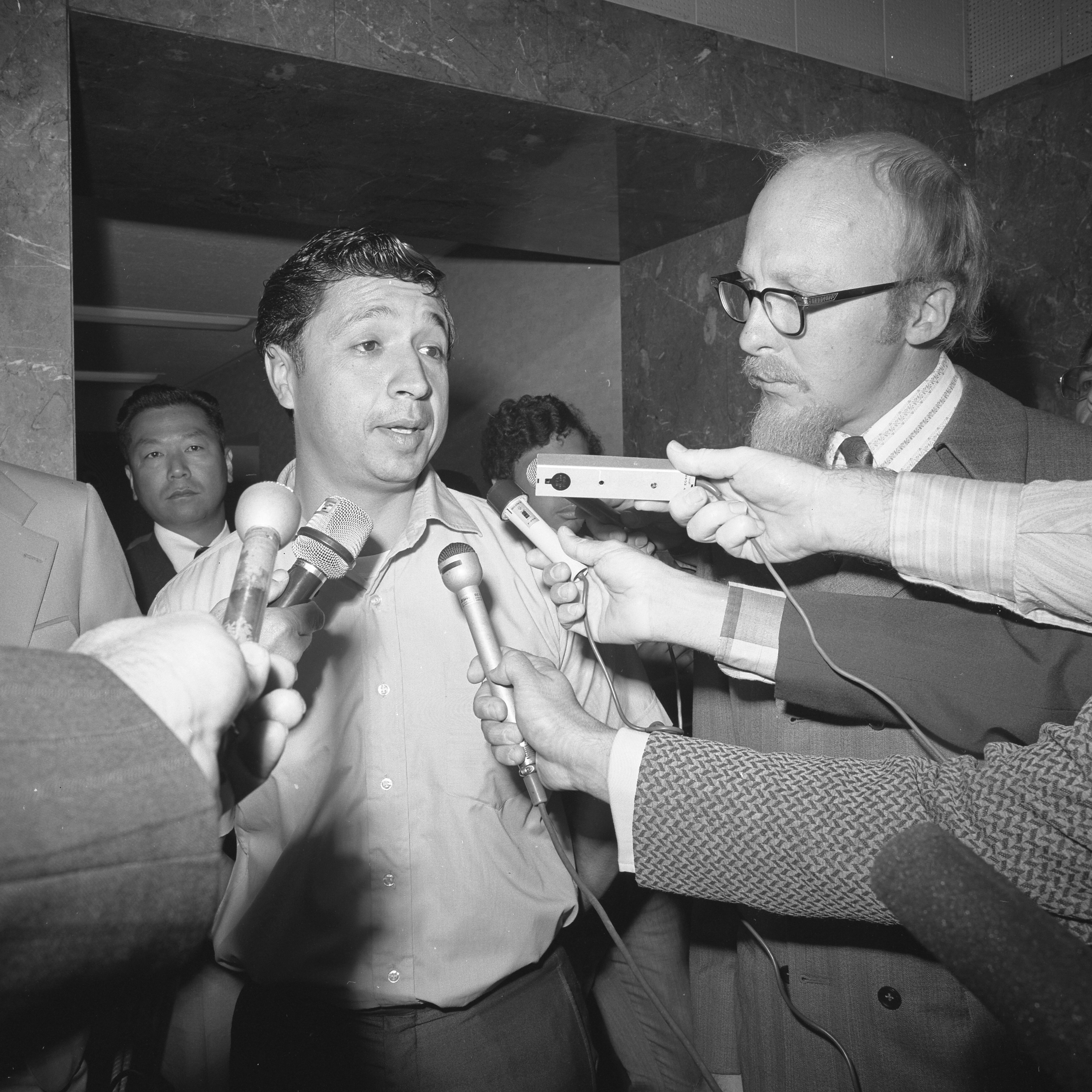
Ricardo Chavez Ortiz talking with reporters in May 1972.

- On April 13, 1972, 36-year-old Mexican immigrant Ricardo Chavez-Ortiz, armed with an unloaded .22-caliber pistol, hijacked Frontier Airlines Flight 91, a Boeing 737-200 flying from Albuquerque, New Mexico, to Phoenix, Arizona, to Los Angeles, California. At Los Angeles International Airport, he released the plane's 31 passengers and made a rambling 34-minute speech while wearing a pilot's hat, complaining about police brutality, racism, and education policy. He ultimately surrendered peacefully.
- On October 20, 1977, ex convict Thomas Michael Hannan pulled a shotgun at a Central Nebraska Regional Airport screening point and forced a Frontier Airlines Boeing 737 to fly to Kansas City for refueling and fly again to Hartsfield Jackson Atlanta International Airport. After certain demands were made, the hostages were released in Atlanta, and the hijacker shot and killed himself.
- On January 18, 1978, a Frontier Airlines de Havilland Canada DHC-6 Twin Otter 300 on a training flight crashed after takeoff at Pueblo Memorial Airport, the aircraft attained an extreme nose-high attitude, and at 100–150 feet, nosed over and crashed. The flaps were set at 30 degrees instead of the normal setting of 10 degrees. All 3 occupants (2 crew and 1 passenger) were killed.

== See also ==
- List of defunct airlines of the United States
