= West Mesa Airport =

- IATA: none; ICAO: none

Summary
- Airport type: Private
- Operator: Transcontinental & Western Air
- Location: Albuquerque
- Elevation AMSL: 5,101 ft / 1,555 m
- Coordinates: 35°5′13″N 106°42′56″W
- Interactive map of West Mesa Airport

Runways
Direction	Length		Surface
Direction	ft	m	Surface
2/20	5,400	1,646	Rolled clay / sand
7/25	5,700	1,737	Rolled clay / sand
11/29	4,550	1,387	Rolled clay / sand
16/34	6,300	1,920	Rolled clay / sand

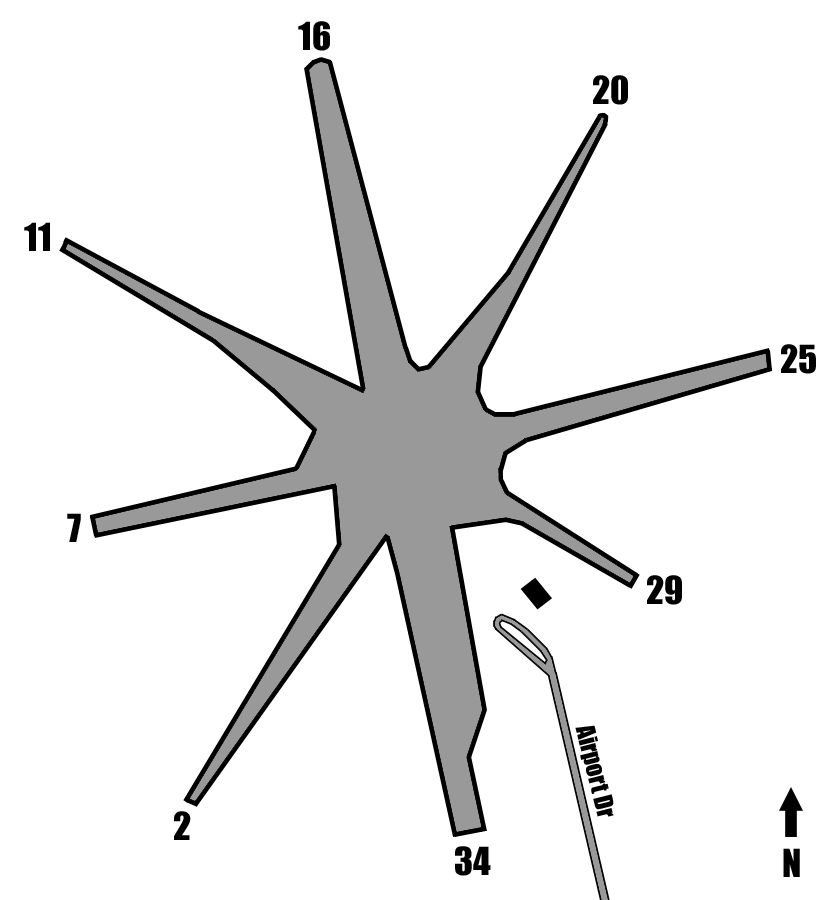
Diagram of West Mesa Airport

West Mesa Airport, also known as Western Air Express Airport, TWA Airport, or Cutter-Carr Airport, was an airport on the West Side of Albuquerque, New Mexico, United States, which was the city's main commercial aviation facility during the 1930s. It was built in 1929 by Western Air Express as a stop on the airline's Los Angeles–Kansas City route, with a hangar and passenger terminal added in 1930. It was the city's second airfield after the original Albuquerque Airport, which was used by a rival airline, Transcontinental Air Transport (TAT). The two airlines merged in 1930 to form TWA, moving all of their operations to the West Mesa field. The merger gave TWA control of the nation's first coast-to-coast passenger airline route and allowed it to secure a lucrative federal airmail contract.

West Mesa Airport provided commercial passenger service on TWA's Los Angeles–New York route, with direct flights to Los Angeles, Winslow, Arizona, and Amarillo, Texas. The airport was also served by the El Paso–Pueblo, Colorado route operated by Mid Continent Air Express (later Varney Speed Lines and then Continental Airlines). All commercial airline service moved to the new Albuquerque Municipal Airport when it opened in 1939. The unused West Mesa Airport was subsequently used as a nightclub and auto racing venue for a brief period before being leased to Cutter-Carr Flying Service in 1940. The airport remained in use for general aviation until the 1960s, last appearing on aeronautical charts in 1967. It was subsequently abandoned and razed. A section of runway 11 and some foundations were still visible until 2021.

The airport was located about 4 miles (6.4 km) west of Downtown Albuquerque, on the north side of Central Avenue at what is now Airport Drive. The airport had four unpaved runways arranged in the shape of an eight-pointed star, the longest of which was the 6,300-foot (1,900 m) runway 16/34. The main buildings were the 125-by-150-foot (38 by 46 m) hangar, which was designed to house two Fokker F-32 aircraft, and the Pueblo-style passenger terminal. When built, the location on the West Mesa was surrounded by empty desert, though it has mostly been filled in with new development since the airport closed.
