= Angel Fire Airport =

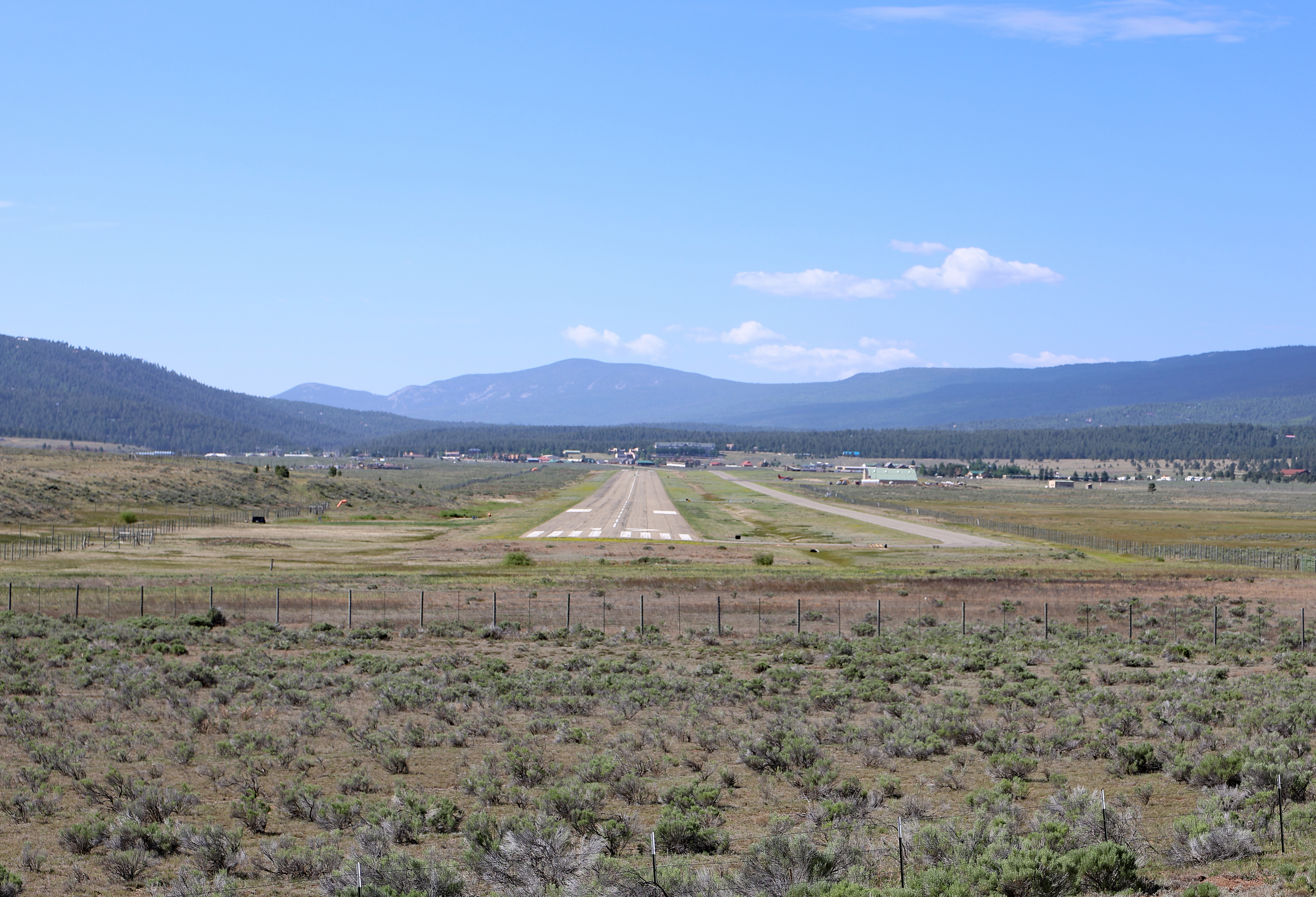
- Runway 17/35 (2026)
- IATA: AXX; ICAO: KAXX; FAA LID: AXX

Summary
- Airport type: Public
- Owner: Colfax County
- Serves: Angel Fire, New Mexico, US
- Elevation AMSL: 8,379.5 ft (2,554.1 m)
- Coordinates: 36°25′19.201″N 105°17′23.658″W
- Website: Official website

Map
- Location of airport in New Mexico

Runways
Direction	Length		Surface
Direction	ft	m	Surface
17/35	8,900	2,713	Asphalt

Statistics (2010)
- Aircraft operations: 30
- Source: Federal Aviation Administration

Angel Fire Airport (IATA: AXX, ICAO: KAXX, FAA LID: AXX) is a county-owned public-use airport located 1 nautical mile (1.9 km; 1.2 mi) north of the central business district of Angel Fire, a town in Colfax County, New Mexico. It is included in the US National Plan of Integrated Airport Systems for 2011–2015, which falls under the US FAA category of "general aviation facility".

== Facilities and aircraft ==
Angel Fire Airport covers an area of 220 acres (89 ha) at an elevation of 8,379.5 feet (2,554.1 m) above mean sea level. It has one runway designated 17/35 with an asphalt surface measuring 8,900 by 100 feet (2,713 by 30 m). For the 12-month period ending April 30, 2010, the airport had 30 aircraft operations, an average of 2 per month: 67% general aviation and 33% military.

The airport briefly saw commercial air service during the winter of 1986/1987 when Mesa Airlines provided a daily flight to Albuquerque. After 38 years, scheduled service returned for the winter of 2024/2025 by Advanced Air with a commuter flight to Albuquerque as well. Service is planned to continue on a seasonal basis for the summer and winter months.

== Airlines and destinations ==
Airlines	Destinations
Advanced Air	Seasonal: Albuquerque
