= Oxnard Field =

Coordinates: 35.0507°N 106.5541°W

- IATA: none; ICAO: none

Summary
- Location: Albuquerque, New Mexico
- Opened: 1928
- Closed: 1948
- Interactive map of Oxnard Field

Oxnard Field (also known at various times as Albuquerque Airport and Albuquerque Army Air Field) was the first airport in Albuquerque, New Mexico. It served as the home of commercial aviation in Albuquerque from 1928 to 1929 and remained in use for other purposes until 1948. The field was located on Albuquerque's East Mesa, east of the present site of Albuquerque International Sunport.

== History ==
The field was originally constructed in 1928 by Santa Fe Railroad workers Frank G. Speakman and William Langford Franklin, using grading equipment loaned by the city after hours. Working with the town of Albuquerque, they graded two runways on the East Mesa—one approximately 5,300 feet (1,600 m) long and the other just under 4,000 feet (1,200 m). The venture became Albuquerque Airport. Other individuals and promoters soon became interested in Albuquerque as a crossroads location for southwestern air traffic.

James G. Oxnard, a New York entrepreneur, bought out Franklin's share in the airport soon after it was completed and renamed it Oxnard Field. Oxnard expanded the facility to 480 acres (1.9 km^{2}), adding an administration building and other facilities.

In its brief stint as the city's main airport, Oxnard Field was served by two competing airlines, Western Air Express (WAE) and Transcontinental Air Transport (TAT). However, the proximity of the field to the Sandia Mountains made pilots uneasy, and Western Air Express built a new facility, West Mesa Airport, in 1929. Following the merger of TAT and WAE to form Transcontinental and Western Air (TWA), all commercial air service shifted to West Mesa. This airport became known as Albuquerque Airport—while the former Albuquerque Airport on the East Mesa took on the name Oxnard Field, continuing as a private venture.

The onset of World War II brought new activity to Oxnard Field. By 1939, Army and Navy pilots had begun using Oxnard Field for refuelling and maintenance. The Army eventually bought the Oxnard Field property and its subsequent transfer to the federal government on April 3, 1942 restricted the runways to military use only. The Army established a training depot for aircraft mechanics near Oxnard Field. An Army Air Forces Air Depot Training Station was established in June, and shortly thereafter the airport was designated Albuquerque Army Air Field. Two new runways and a variety of other facilities were built during this period.

By 1943, however, the mechanics' training program had ended and the depot was used as a convalescent center for wounded air crewmen and then as a storage and dismantling facility for war-weary and surplus aircraft as the war ended. Over 2,000 such planes were stripped and melted down, reclaiming some 10 million pounds of aluminum.

The field was used for the last time between 1945 and 1948, when it served as the final destination for hundreds of surplus warplanes which were assembled there for scrapping. Following the end of this operation, the airport was closed permanently.

== Facilities ==
The airport initially had two dirt runways, east-west (4300 ft) and northeast-southwest (2500 ft). The only facilities consisted of gravity-fed fuel tanks. Oxnard added the administration building, a hangar, and a 52-foot (16 m) beacon. The Airport Inn was a popular dining establishment. The airport reached its final configuration during the war, when the north-south and northwest-southeast runways were added.

== Oxnard Field today ==
The former airport is now part of Kirtland Air Force Base, and new development has covered most of it. However, part of the northeast-southwest runway remains visible and the former administration building and hangar are still standing. Another legacy of Oxnard Field is the major streets Wyoming Boulevard and Ridgecrest Drive, both of which were originally developed as airport access roads.

== Notes ==
1. Oppenheimer, Alan J. (1962). The Historical Background of Albuquerque, New Mexico. City of Albuquerque Planning Department. p. 47.
2. Oppenheimer, p. 48.
