= Cell phone lot =

Area for parking at airports

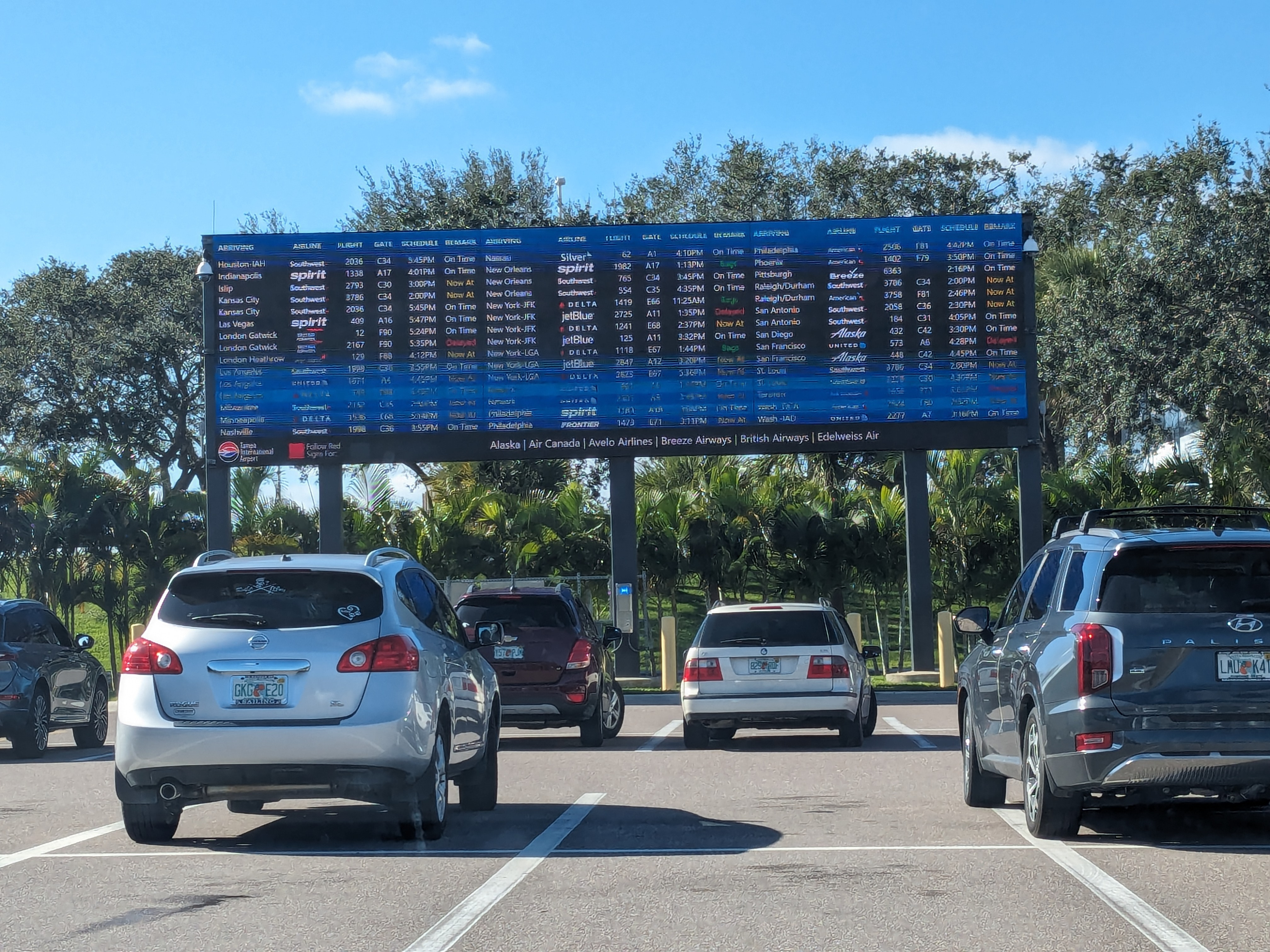
Arrival board in cell phone lot at Tampa International Airport

A cell phone lot is a parking lot, typically located at airports, where people can wait before picking up passengers. The purpose of these lots is to reduce congestion at arrival sections by preventing cars from continuously circling the airport or waiting on the sides of highways to avoid paying fees at the airport parking lots. Once the passenger's flight lands, they collect their luggage and call the person waiting in the cell phone lot to pick them up. These lots are usually free and only minutes away from the terminals.
