= Albuquerque International Sunport =

Airport in New Mexico, United States

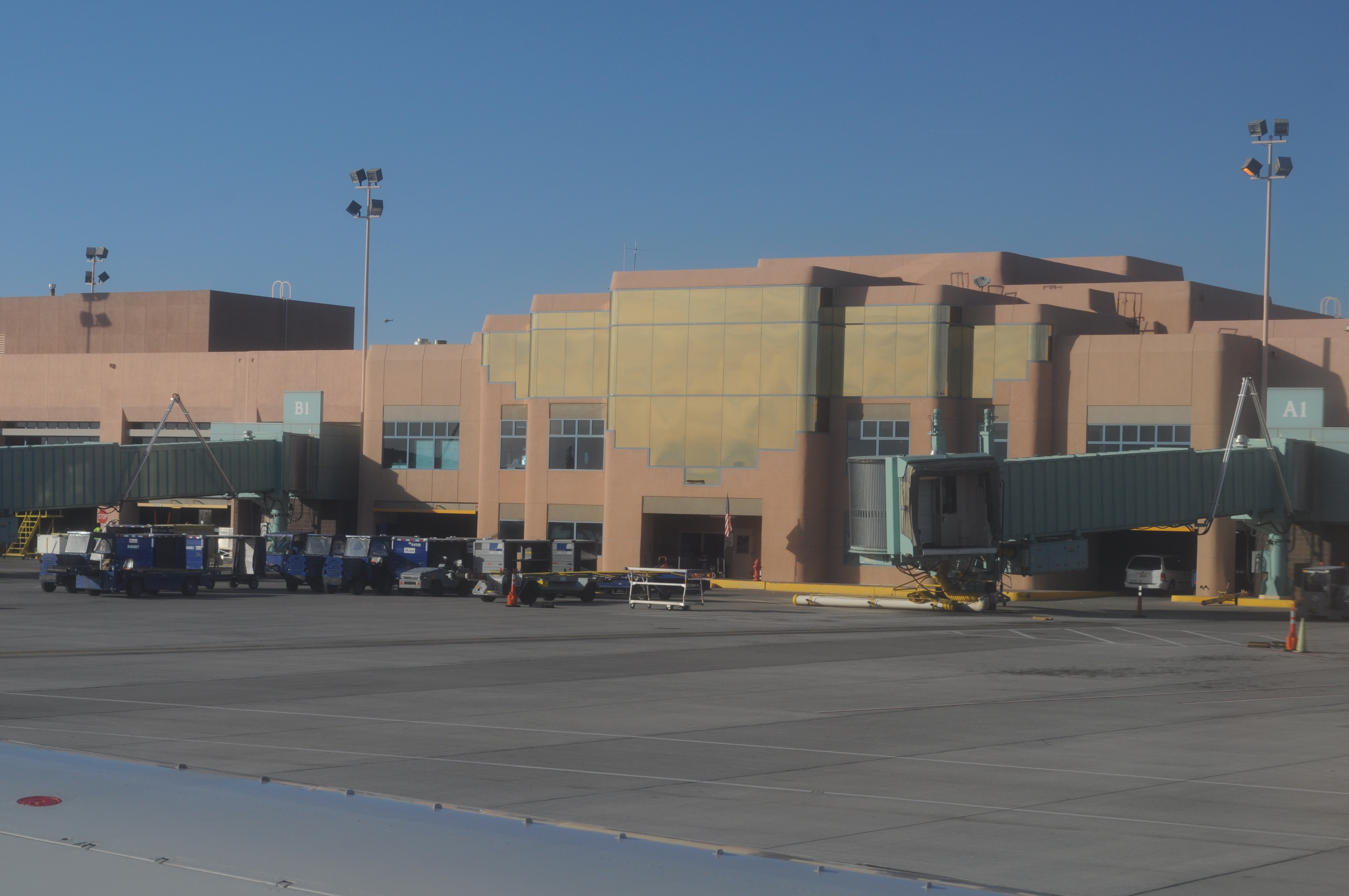
- IATA: ABQ; ICAO: KABQ; FAA LID: ABQ; WMO: 72365

Summary
- Airport type: Military/Public
- Owner: City of Albuquerque, New Mexico, United States
- Operator: Albuquerque Aviation Department
- Serves: Albuquerque metropolitan area
- Location: 2200 Sunport Boulevard SE; Albuquerque, New Mexico
- Time zone: MST (UTC−07:00)
  - Summer (DST): MDT (UTC−06:00)
- Elevation AMSL: 5,355 ft (1,632 m)
- Coordinates: 35°02′21.6″N 106°36′38.8″W
- Website: abqsunport.com

Maps
- FAA diagram
- Interactive map of Albuquerque International Sunport

Runways
Direction	Length		Surface
Direction	ft	m	Surface
03/21	10,000	3,048	Concrete
08/26	13,793	4,204	Concrete
12/30	6,000	1,829	Concrete

Statistics (2025)
- Aircraft operations: 155,854
- Total passengers: 5,311,480
- Sources: airport website and FAA

Albuquerque International Sunport (IATA: ABQ, ICAO: KABQ, FAA LID: ABQ), locally known as the Sunport, is the primary international airport serving the U.S. state of New Mexico, particularly the Albuquerque metropolitan area and the larger Albuquerque–Santa Fe–Los Alamos combined statistical area. It handles around 5.5 million passengers annually and over 400 flights daily. ABQ is located in Bernalillo County, between the Rio Grande and the Sandia Mountains, east of Old Town and Barelas, 3 miles (5 km) southeast of downtown, south of the University of New Mexico and directly to the west of Sandia National Laboratories and Kirtland Air Force Base.

ABQ is a focus airport for Southwest Airlines, which accounts for over half of all passengers, and is served by several other major airlines, including Advanced Air, Alaska, American, Delta, JetBlue, and United; cargo airlines serving the Sunport are FedEx Express, UPS Airlines, Empire Airlines (FedEx Feeder carrier), Ameriflight, Amazon Prime Air (operated by Sun Country), and South Aero. ABQ is the center of the Air Route Traffic Control Center (ZAB), which is responsible for the airspace over most of Arizona and New Mexico, as well as parts of Colorado, Oklahoma, and Texas.

ABQ has a wide range of restaurants and shops, including national brands such as Dunkin' and Panda Express. It also features local gift shops, local eateries, and local craft beverage makers such as Black Mesa Coffee, Burque Brews, Cheese & Coffee, Famous Frank's Chicken & Waffles, Flavor of New Mexico, Indian Pueblo Kitchen, Laguna Burger, New Mexico Piñon Coffee, Rush of Prana, Sadie's, Steel Bender, and Teller.

The Sunport is unique for its low-lying structure and Pueblo Revival architecture, which references Albuquerque's Tiwa and Hispano heritage and New Mexico's Pueblo and Nuevo México roots. In a 2025 Washington Post reader's poll, it ranked seventh best airports in the U.S.

== History ==
Albuquerque was first served by two private airports. The Albuquerque Airport, later known as Oxnard Field, opened in 1928, and the West Mesa Airport, later known as the TWA airport, opened in 1929. The first airlines to serve the airports were Transcontinental Air Transport (TAT), Western Air Express (WAE), and Mid Continent Air Express, all inaugurating service in 1929. At first the airlines operated from the Albuquerque Airport but within the first year had moved to the West Mesa Airport where they stayed for most of the 1930s decade. TAT and WAE merged in 1930 to form Transcontinental and Western Air (TWA). Mid Continent Air Express' service was replaced by Varney Speed Lines in 1934. Three years later Varney changed its name to Continental Airlines.

In 1935, it was suggested that the city build a new public airport using Works Progress Administration money. Having secured US$520,500 in funding, Governor Clyde Tingley broke ground for the project on February 28, 1937. Albuquerque Municipal Airport opened in 1939 with two paved runways, a Pueblo Style terminal building designed by Ernest Blumenthal, and a large hangar designed to accommodate the new Boeing 307 Stratoliner operated by TWA. TWA became Trans World Airlines in 1946. Within two years after the airport opened, the Albuquerque Army Air Base was constructed to the east. This facility later became Kirtland Air Force Base and still shares the runways and other facilities with the commercial operations of the airport today. Monarch Airlines came to Albuquerque in 1947 then merged with other carriers to become Frontier Airlines in 1950. Pioneer Air Lines began service in 1948 and merged into Continental Airlines in 1955. TWA, the largest of the carriers serving Albuquerque, introduced the first jet service in 1961 using the Boeing 707. The airport was renamed Albuquerque Sunport on April 17, 1963. In late 1963, Trans Texas Airways (later becoming Texas International Airlines) began service, rounding out the first four carriers to serve the airport prior to the airline deregulation act of 1978. Several smaller commuter airlines also served the airport over the years including Ross Aviation.

The present terminal was designed by William E. Burk Jr. It is built just east of the original terminal and opened on November 12, 1965. At first the terminal had eight gates, four at the main building and another four at a small satellite building to the south connected by a tunnel. None of the gates had jetbridges. The airport gained international status in 1971 and was renamed the Albuquerque International Airport on September 17, 1971.

The terminal has been expanded several times, first in 1973 when a west wing was added with a large gate and jetbridge able to handle new wide-body aircraft. TWA used this gate to introduce the Lockheed L-1011 to Albuquerque in 1974 with flights to Chicago. After airline deregulation was passed in 1978, a flood of new airlines came to ABQ. The west wing was expanded in 1980 with three more gates, all of which had jetbridges and were used extensively by TWA and several new carriers. Southwest Airlines, which started service on April 3, 1980, quickly grew to become the largest carrier serving the airport. Southwest used the old gates 1 and 2 at the main terminal and installed three ground level jetbridges at these two gates.

During 1987 through 1989, the terminal was greatly expanded and renovated advertising a design by Phillip Jacobson and BPLW Associates. A second level was added to the front of the building for separate arrival and departure levels, and the satellite gate building was replaced with two concourses, A and B, giving the Sunport 19 new gates, all with jetbridges. In 1994, the airport's name was changed to the current designation of the Albuquerque International Sunport. Concourse A was further expanded with four additional gates in 1996 and the above-ground connector link to the concourses was expanded in 2005 to accommodate the need for additional security screening by the TSA after the September 11 attacks in 2001. The three gates added to the west wing in 1980 were no longer used and were removed in 2007. From 2017 through 2020, the terminal received an extensive modernization and facelift.

Several fixed-base operators handling general aviation have operated at the Sunport over the years, the largest being Cutter Aviation, which traces its roots back to the original Albuquerque Airport in 1928. Cutter relocated to the current Sunport grounds in 1947 operating from a large hangar on the southwest corner of the terminal ramp. An all-new general aviation facility was constructed on the south side of the main east–west runway during the mid-1980s and the Cutter hangar was torn down for the terminal expansion of 1987–1989. A new United States Post Office facility and a new freight facility and air cargo ramp were opened in the 1990s. In 2001, a new off-site rental car facility was opened, and all rental car operations were moved out of the main terminal.

The old terminal of 1939 has been restored and houses offices of the Transportation Security Administration. It was added to the National Register of Historic Places in 1988.

=== Historical airline service ===
The Sunport is served by Alaska, American, Delta, JetBlue, Southwest, and United Airlines, as well as two commuter airlines, Advanced Air and Contour Airlines. Total weekday departures averaged 427 flights per day in 2025. Many extra flights are added during the week of the Albuquerque International Balloon Fiesta in early October of each year.

In the past, Albuquerque has been served by the following commercial airlines: TWA (1929–2001), Continental (1934–2012), Pioneer (1948–1955), Monarch (1947–1950), Frontier (1950–1986), Trans Texas/Texas International (1963–1982), Eastern (1979–1988), Western (1981–1987), PSA (1983–1988), America West (1983–2007), Wien Air Alaska (1984), USAir (1988–1997), Braniff (1988–1989), Pan Am (1989–1990), Northwest (1992–2010), Frontier (1994-2014 and 2017–2023), Reno Air (1995–1998), Western Pacific/Mountain Air Express (1997), AeroMexico Connect (1993-1994 and 2009–2010), Great Plains (2001–2004), US Airways (formerly USAir) (2007–2015), ExpressJet (2007–2008), Allegiant (2016–2022), Volaris (2018–2019), and Spirit (2022–2025).

TWA was first: passenger flights began in 1929, with Albuquerque being one of many stops on a transcontinental route between Los Angeles and New York. TWA had the first jets to serve ABQ, the Boeing 707, and Convair 880 in 1961. In 1974 TWA brought the first wide-body jet to ABQ, the Lockheed 1011. Service peaked in 1979 with 21 daily departures to 13 cities including nonstops to Los Angeles and New York. After airline deregulation in the early 1980s, TWA downsized its operation and in 1985 only had flights to its hub at St. Louis. Service continued until December 2, 2001, when the carrier merged with American Airlines.

Continental Airlines was second at Albuquerque, since 1934 as a stop on its north–south route between Denver and El Paso. In 1940 Continental added flights to several smaller cities in Southeastern New Mexico but that was transferred to Frontier and Trans Texas Airways in 1963. In the latter half of the 1960s Continental expanded with Boeing 720, Boeing 727, and Douglas DC-9 jets nonstop to Chicago, Dallas, Denver, El Paso, Lubbock, Midland/Odessa, San Antonio, and San Francisco. Service peaked in summer 1977 with 24 daily departures. Continental downsized its operation after airline deregulation and by 1994 was only flying to its Houston hub (a nonstop flight to Newark was added for a period in the mid-2000s). Continental merged with United Airlines in 2012.

Frontier Airlines began service to Albuquerque in 1947 as Monarch Airlines, flying to Salt Lake City with stops at many smaller cities in the four corners states. Service was expanded in the 1960s with Boeing 727 and Boeing 737 jets to Denver, El Paso, Phoenix, Tucson, Dallas, and Las Vegas and in 1973 Frontier operated 19 daily flights at ABQ. Frontier began the first international flights to several resort cities in Mexico in the early 1980s but the carrier closed down in 1986. A new Frontier Airlines came to ABQ in 1994 with flights to Denver and El Paso. The carrier discontinued service in 2014 but returned in October 2017 with flights once again to Denver. Service to Austin, Orlando and San Antonio were added in 2018 but discontinued in 2019. Service was changed from Denver to Las Vegas, NV in 2022 but Frontier ended all service to Albuquerque by the end of 2022.

Pioneer Air Lines served Albuquerque between 1948 and 1955 with two flights per day to Dallas, Texas making eight stops en route. Pioneer merged into Continental Airlines in 1955 and by 1959 Continental was flying the route nonstop. The Albuquerque to Dallas route would be a major stronghold for Continental for the next 20 years.

In 1963 Trans-Texas Airways came to Albuquerque, taking over service to the smaller cities in New Mexico that Continental had served. It later expanded with nonstop Douglas DC-9s to Dallas and Los Angeles. TTA became Texas International Airlines in 1969 and flew DC-9's from ABQ to Santa Fe and Roswell, New Mexico. The carrier peaked in 1975 with 15 daily departures and merged with Continental Airlines in 1982.

Southwest Airlines began service to the Sunport in 1980 and expanded quickly creating a hub at ABQ. The carrier took over the number one spot by the early 1980s and peaked with 66 daily departures in October 2001. Although Southwest has cut back since then, it has served 29 cities nonstop from ABQ. The decline in service is attributed to the repeal of the Wright Amendment which only allowed air travel to Texas and airports in bordering states from Dallas Love Field.

American Airlines began serving the Sunport in 1979, Delta Air Lines in 1982, United Airlines in 1983, jetBlue in 2013, Alaska Airlines in 2014, and Sun Country in 2024 (Seasonally).

At least 35 commuter and regional airlines have served Albuquerque, the largest of these by far was Mesa Airlines which served the Sunport from 1980 through 2007. Mesa peaked with 46 daily departures in 1990 and served 18 cities in New Mexico and Colorado nonstop from their hub in ABQ. Mesa still serves ABQ but now as a regional airline providing feeder service for American Eagle and United Express on regional jets. Other larger commuter airlines that served the Sunport for many years include Air Midwest and Great Lakes Airlines.

Regional airlines serving the Sunport on behalf of the majors are: CommutAir, Envoy, Horizon, Mesa, Republic, and SkyWest. Sun Country Airlines, iAero, and Denver Air Connection, also serve ABQ with regular charter flights.

In November 2018, low-cost Mexican carrier Volaris began serving Albuquerque from Guadalajara, Mexico, and later from Chihuahua, Mexico — a route previously operated by Aeroméxico Connect in 2009. Volaris stopped serving Albuquerque in June 2019 due to very low passenger loads and a disagreement over government subsidies to its flights. At that time, these were the only two international destinations offered by any airline flying to Albuquerque.

=== Military facilities and operations ===
The Sunport began a new role in 1940 when it was designated Albuquerque Army Air Base, the precursor to today's Kirtland Air Force Base. The Sunport continues to share its runways with Kirtland AFB, which also handles rescue and firefighting operations. An Air Force Global Strike Command (AFGSC) installation, the host unit is the 377th Air Base Wing (377 ABW). Flying units at Kirtland AFB consist of the 58th Special Operations Wing (58 SOW) of the Air Education and Training Command (AETC) and the 150th Special Operations Wing (150 SOW), an Air Education and Training Command (AETC)-gained unit of the New Mexico Air National Guard.

=== Future developments ===
The Airport Master Plan drafted in 2002 lays out intermediate- and long-term projects at the Sunport, including the construction of a second terminal when traffic demands it. The runway 17/35 closure and removal recommendation was based on safety, noise abatement, and the cost of upkeep. Because 17/35 intersected all three of the other runways, it ran the highest risk of runway incursions. The runway was closed in the summer of 2012, and the tarmac is used for taxiing aircraft and for a firefighting training aircraft located on the north end. The configuration of the other three runways, in conjunction with typical wind patterns, enabled them to handle departures and landings more efficiently.

With the closure of Runway 17/35, approximately 75 acres of land just northeast of the terminal complex became available for redevelopment. The City of Albuquerque has initiated a project called Destination Sunport to promote the area as an emerging business hub supporting collaboration among Albuquerque's research and development community and the global marketplace. Development of the business park began on 14 December 2018, with three phases estimated to be completed over five years.

== Facilities ==
The Albuquerque International Sunport covers 2,039 acres (825 ha) and has three runways. In 2025, the Sunport had 155,854 aircraft operations with an average of 427 per day: 29% scheduled commercial, 20% air taxi, 36% general aviation and 15% military. As of February 2022, there were 205 fixed-wing aircraft and 33 helicopters based at the Sunport, 48 (20%) of which were military-affiliated. ABQ's terminal, which was expanded in the late 1980s, and again to its present size in 1996, encompasses 574,000 sq ft (53,300 m^{2}) of space. The Sunport has a Pueblo Revival style passenger terminal which houses two concourses and an area for commuter airline gates.

The largest passenger aircraft scheduled into Albuquerque is the Boeing 737-900ER, operated by Delta Air Lines on flights to Atlanta. American Airlines occasionally operates Airbus A321's as equipment swaps. The largest regular passenger aircraft used to be the Boeing 757-200 and McDonnell Douglas MD-90, both operated by Delta, who flew the aircraft to and from Atlanta, Cincinnati, and Minneapolis. The largest commercial aircraft the Sunport usually sees is a FedEx or UPS Boeing 767-300, replacing the latter's McDonnell Douglas DC-10 and McDonnell Douglas MD-11 that now only fly in on rare occasions. The largest passenger aircraft to have ever flown in is the Boeing 747-400 which was operated by Atlas Air on a military charter flight on January 27, 2021. Another large aircraft, the Boeing 777 flying for United Airlines, has been diverted to the Sunport from Denver International Airport on several occasions.

In 2013, the aerial firefighting company, 10 Tanker Air Carrier, moved its headquarters to Albuquerque and currently have four DC-10 large air tankers based out of the Albuquerque International Sunport.

The largest aircraft of any type to regularly visit ABQ is the C-5 Galaxy. In 1974, and again from 1982 through 1992, the Sunport had scheduled Trans World Airlines Lockheed L-1011s. The largest aircraft to have ever visited the Sunport is the Antonov An-124, of which some have landed at ABQ on a couple of extremely rare occasions.

== Terminal ==
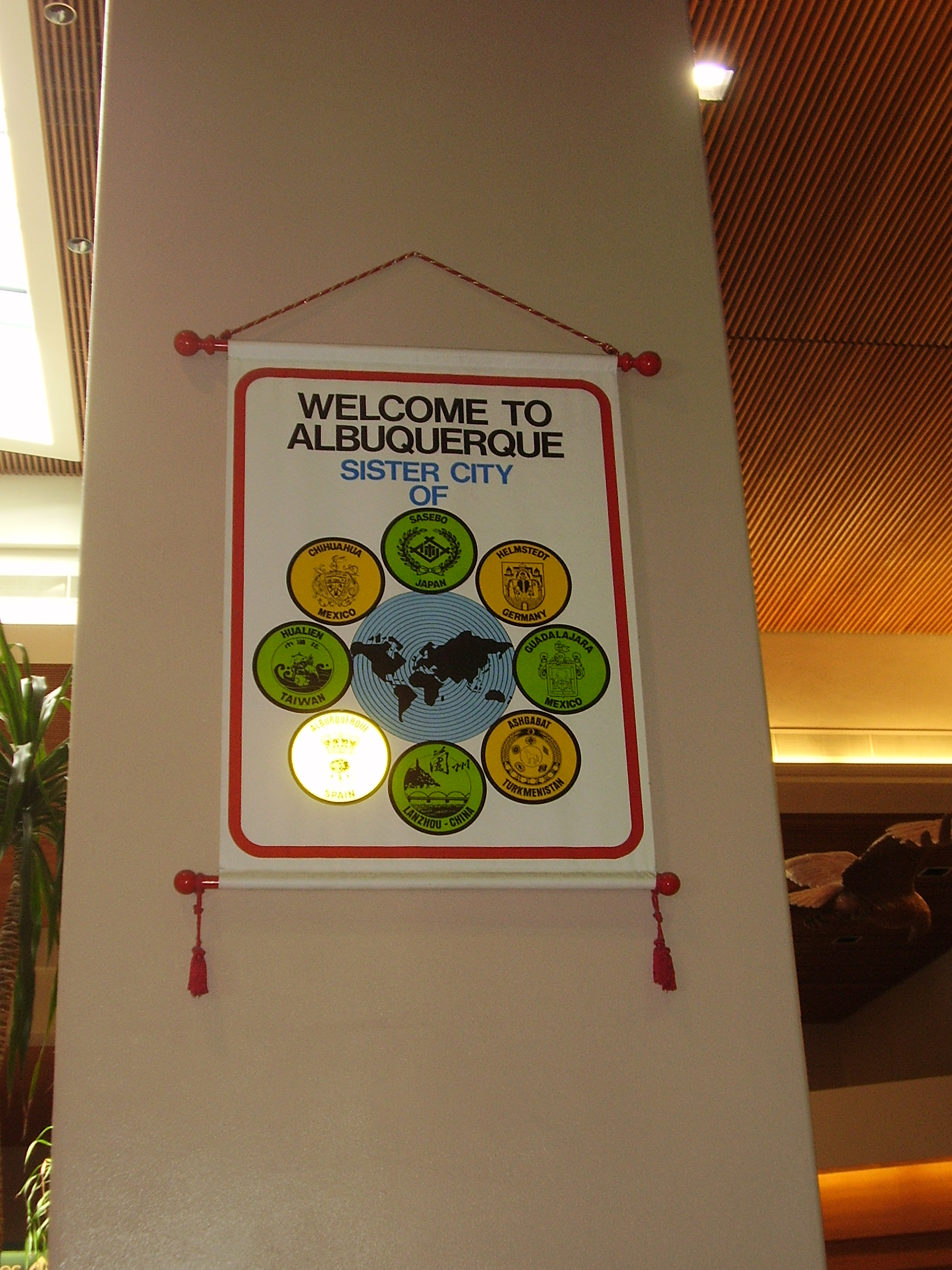
Banner inside the Sunport terminal listing Albuquerque's sister cities

The Albuquerque International Sunport has one terminal with 25 gates in four concourses, including a concourse for commuter airline gates. The terminal was originally built in 1965, but expanded in 1989; this expansion has present-day concourses A and B. Concourse A has 13 gates: A1 – A12, A14. Concourse B has 9 gates: B1, B3-B10 (Gate B2 was removed during a security hall expansion in 2005). Concourse E has 2 gates: E1 & E2. Concourse C, originally known as the west wing, consisted of four gates (11, 12, 14, & 15). Gate 11 was closed when the terminal was expanded in 1989 and the remaining three gates were renumbered to C1, C2, & C3. TWA continued to use these gates for a few more years until C2 and C3 showed signs of structural failure and later had to be demolished. TWA then moved to concourse B and the lobby area of gate C1 (built in 1973) is used for regional flights and is located pre-security. Concourse D was a ground-level commuter aircraft concourse that was used by Great Plains Airlines. It was closed in 2004 when Great Plains Airlines liquidated due to insolvency. The former concourse is now a weight and fitness facility for airport employees.

Concourse E was renamed to Concourse C in 2019 and is used by commuter airlines Advanced Air and Contour Airlines.

== Airlines and destinations ==
=== Passenger ===
Airlines	Destinations	Refs
Advanced Air	Silver City; Seasonal: Angel Fire	
Alaska Airlines	Portland (OR), Seattle/Tacoma	
American Airlines	Chicago–O'Hare, Dallas/Fort Worth, Phoenix–Sky Harbor	
American Eagle	Dallas/Fort Worth, Los Angeles, Phoenix–Sky Harbor; Seasonal: Chicago–O'Hare	
Contour Airlines	Carlsbad (NM)	
Delta Air Lines	Atlanta; Seasonal: Minneapolis/St. Paul	
Delta Connection	Los Angeles, Salt Lake City; Seasonal: Seattle/Tacoma	
JetBlue	Seasonal: New York–JFK	
Southwest Airlines	Austin, Baltimore, Burbank, Chicago–Midway, Dallas–Love, Denver, Houston–Hobby, Las Vegas, Los Angeles, Oakland, Phoenix–Sky Harbor, San Diego; Seasonal: Kansas City, Nashville, Orlando, San Antonio	
United Airlines	Chicago–O'Hare, Denver, Houston–Intercontinental, San Francisco; Seasonal: Washington–Dulles	
United Express	Denver, Houston–Intercontinental, San Francisco; Seasonal: Chicago–O'Hare	

Destinations from the Albuquerque International Sunport
Red = Year-round destination
Green = Seasonal destination
Blue = Future destination

== Statistics ==
=== Top domestic destinations ===
Top domestic routes from ABQ (January 2025 – December 2025)
Rank	Airport	Passengers	Airline(s)
1	Denver, Colorado	307,410	Southwest, United
2	Phoenix–Sky Harbor, Arizona	302,380	American, Southwest
3	Dallas/Fort Worth, Texas	270,320	American
4	Las Vegas, Nevada	196,360	Southwest, Spirit
5	Dallas–Love, Texas	161,980	Southwest
6	(Georgia (U.S. state)) Atlanta, Georgia	143,710	Delta
7	Los Angeles, California	124,360	American, Delta, Southwest
8	Chicago–O'Hare, Illinois	110,840	American, United
9	Houston–Hobby, Texas	108,620	Southwest
10	Houston–Intercontinental, Texas	96,550	United

=== Airline market share ===
Airline market share at ABQ (January 2025 – December 2025)
Rank	Airline	Passengers	Share
1	Southwest Airlines	2,578,000	50.46%
2	American Airlines	666,000	13.03%
3	SkyWest	606,000	11.86%
4	United Airlines	407,000	7.96%
5	Delta Air Lines	332,000	6.49%
—	Other	521,000	10.19%

=== Annual traffic ===
Annual passenger traffic (enplaned + deplaned) at ABQ, 1990 thru 2025, civil years
Civil year	Passengers	Year	Passengers	Year	Passengers	Year	Passengers
1990	4,987,713	2000	6,292,458	2010	5,796,373	2020	1,816,411
1991	4,938,431	2001	6,181,606	2011	5,697,625	2021	3,424,083
1992	5,264,577	2002	6,117,645	2012	5,382,223	2022	4,365,400
1993	5,603,248	2003	6,064,418	2013	5,065,179	2023	5,310,976
1994	6,158,300	2004	6,320,142	2014	4,871,901	2024	5,491,970
1995	6,130,451	2005	6,466,435	2015	4,745,256	2025	5,311,480
1996	6,618,751	2006	6,487,276	2016	4,775,098		
1997	6,290,018	2007	6,668,706	2017	4,958,417		
1998	6,149,197	2008	6,489,323	2018	5,467,693		
1999	6,152,493	2009	5,888,811	2019	5,406,094		

=== Aircraft operations ===
The data below lists annual total aircraft operations from 2004 to 2019 from the FAA's Air Traffic Activity System. The percent changes indicate an average of −2.91% in aircraft operations per year over the last 10 years.

Aircraft operations: ABQ 2004–2019
Calendar year	Aircraft operations	%
2004	197,657	—
2005	196,699	−0.48%
2006	192,241	−2.27%
2007	190,780	−0.76%
2008	180,553	−5.36%
2009	158,529	−12.20%
2010	156,616	−1.21%
2011	154,140	−1.58%
2012	147,724	−4.16%
2013	136,915	−7.32%
2014	130,069	−5.00%
2015	124,174	-4.48%
2016	133,914	7.84%
2017	135,269	1.01%
2018	147,877	9.3%
2019	151,588	2.51%

The Sunport's freight center moved 60,000 short tons (54,000 t) of cargo in 2016, a 7% decline from 64,000 short tons (58,000 t) during the 2012 calendar year.

== General aviation support ==
Support for private, corporate, and general aviation aircraft pilots and passengers are handled by two fixed-base operators at the Albuquerque International Sunport: Atlantic Aviation and Cutter Aviation. Both are located on the southwest section of the Sunport off Clark Carr Loop.

== Ground transportation ==
=== Bus ===
ABQ RIDE offers bus service (Route 50) at the west side of the baggage claim area.

=== Commuter train ===
ABQ RIDE Route 222 provides connecting service to the New Mexico Rail Runner Express Bernalillo County/International Sunport Station. ABQ RIDE Route 50 provides service to the Alvarado Transportation Center in Downtown Albuquerque, where it connects with the Rail Runner operating service north and south of the Sunport, including Santa Fe.

=== Rental car service ===
ABQ operates the Car Rental Center and provides free, courtesy shuttles every five minutes between the Sunport terminal and the facility. The following companies are located at the Car Rental Center: Alamo, Avis, Budget, Dollar, Enterprise, Hertz, National, Payless, Thrifty, and Sixt.

=== Scheduled shuttle bus service ===
Regularly scheduled bus and shuttle service is provided by various carriers to locations from ABQ to the city and to Santa Fe.

=== Taxi ===
Taxis can be hailed through the Ground Transportation employees outside the baggage claim areas.

== Incidents and accidents ==
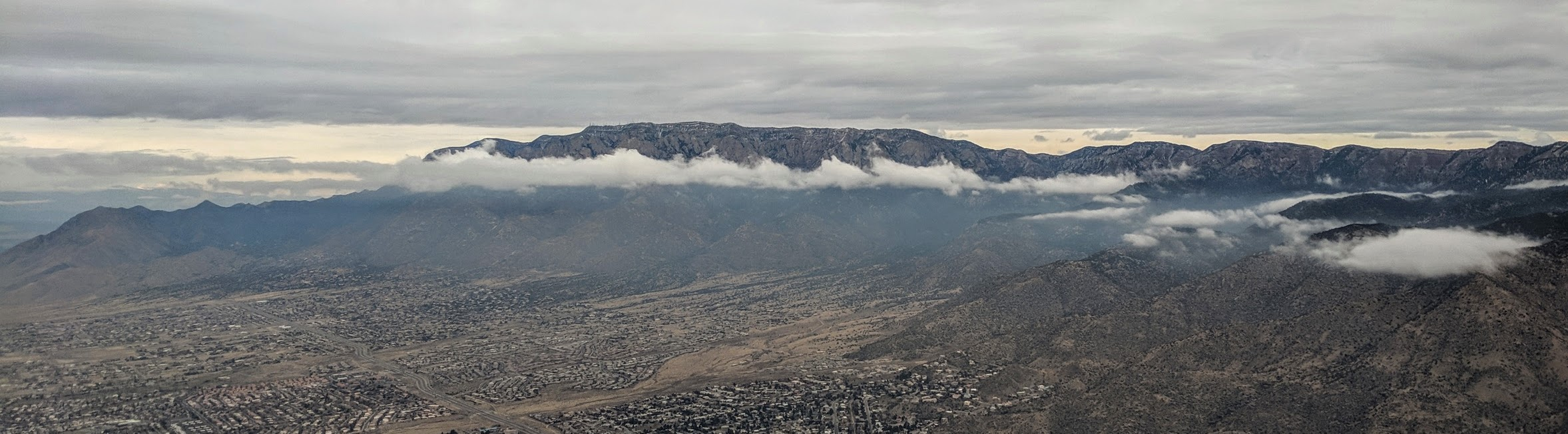
The Sandia Mountains sticking out above the clouds, viewed on takeoff from ABQ

- On February 19, 1955, TWA Flight 260, a Martin 4-0-4 bound for Santa Fe, crashed into the Sandia Mountains shortly after takeoff. All 16 people on board the flight were killed.
- On September 11, 1958, a US Air Force F-102 Delta Dagger slid off the end of Runway 35 in heavy rain and struck a car on Gibson Boulevard before coming to rest in an empty lot on the north side of the street. Both occupants of the car were killed.
- On November 27, 1971, in the early morning hours, TWA Flight 106, a Boeing 727 destined for Chicago, was hijacked to Cuba. The hijackers, three men who had killed a New Mexico State Police Officer two weeks prior, were taken into custody in Havana and never returned to the United States.
- On November 3, 1973, National Airlines Flight 27, a McDonnell Douglas DC-10, suffered a catastrophic engine failure over an area near Datil, NM, while en route from Houston to Las Vegas. Shrapnel from the engine struck the fuselage and caused an explosive decompression of the aircraft. One passenger was blown out of the cabin and killed. The plane was able to make an emergency landing at ABQ with no further fatalities.
- On September 14, 1977, a USAF Boeing EC-135 crashed into the Manzano Mountains just after takeoff, killing all 20 people on board.
- On September 11, 1990, a Morane Saulnier MS.760 Paris operated by Stonewall Transport, bound for Las Cruces, New Mexico, impacted terrain after takeoff moments later during a night flight. Pilot fatigue and spatial disorientation were the probable causes. Both occupants died.
- On July 6, 1997, Delta Air Lines Flight 1470, a Boeing 727, suffered a right landing gear failure after landing on Runway 21. While there were no fatalities, 3 people were injured and the aircraft suffered serious damage.
- On June 4, 2021, a Delta Air Lines flight from Los Angeles to Nashville was forced to make an emergency landing in Albuquerque, after an unruly passenger attempted to force open the cockpit door. He was restrained by a flight attendant and several passengers, and law enforcement officers on the ground arrested the assailant.

== Amenities ==
- The Sunport provides free Wi-Fi internet access. In February 2005, the Sunport was voted one of the top five U.S. airports for wireless access, and the only one that provided it for free, according to a Microsoft Small Business Center poll. As of October 2022, the service is still provided free.
- There is a free cell phone parking area, where meeters and greeters can park and wait for a call from their arriving passenger before driving to the front of the terminal for pickup.
- There are two free aircraft observation areas, including one near the aforementioned Cellphone lot that is adjacent to now-closed Runway 17/35. A larger observation area at the southwest corner of the airfield property, near the approach end of Runway 3 was accessible from Spirit Dr. SE. This area has since been closed to the public, with only the aforementioned lot adjacent to the closed 17/35 runway being the remaining aircraft observation area. These areas were created to replace a large parking area adjacent to the approach ends of Runways 8 and 12 that closed in 2007; an Eclipse Aerospace aircraft painting facility now occupies this location.
