= Westward Airways (Nebraska) =

IATA	ICAO	Call sign
CN	WWD	Westward
- Founded: 2002; 23 years ago
- Commenced operations: June 1, 2004; 21 years ago
- Ceased operations: July 25, 2005; 19 years ago
- Focus cities: "The River Route": Scottsbluff; North Platte; Kearney; Lincoln; Omaha
- Fleet size: 3
- Headquarters: Scottsbluff, Nebraska

Westward Airways was a regional airline based in Scottsbluff, Nebraska. It ceased flight operations on July 25, 2005.

== History ==
The airline was established in 2002 and started operations on June 1, 2004, with flights on a Scottsbluff - North Platte - Kearney - Lincoln - Omaha route also known as "the river route". On November 30, 2004, a new operation was created in New Mexico linking Albuquerque with Alamogordo, Gallup, Las Cruces, and Taos. In early July 2005, Westward Airways halted services to Alamogordo and a few other cities. As the Albuquerque to Alamogordo route was subsidized under Essential Air Service, the airline was ordered to maintain operating this route. Flights were reinstated for a few more days but operations were stopped altogether on July 25, 2005.

== Services ==
Westward Airways operated services to the following scheduled domestic destinations: Lincoln, North Platte, Omaha, Scottsbluff, and Kearney. On April 5, 2005, new services were initiated at Albuquerque, Alamogordo, Gallup, Las Cruces, and Taos. Services were planned to Phoenix from both Gallup and Las Cruces but these routes never began.

== Fleet ==
- 3 - Pilatus PC-12

== See also ==
- List of defunct airlines of the United States
