= Joplin Regional Airport =

Joplin Regional Airport (JLN)
- IATA: JLN; ICAO: KJLN; FAA LID: JLN

Summary
- Airport type: Public
- Owner: City of Joplin
- Serves: Joplin, Missouri, U.S.
- Opened: April 1940
- Elevation AMSL: 978 ft (298 m)
- Coordinates: 37°09′06″N 094°29′54″W
- Website: FlyJoplin.com

Maps
- Airport diagram

- Location within Missouri Location within the United States

Runways
| Direction | Length | | Surface |
| Direction | ft | m | Surface |
|---|---|---|---|
| 13/31 | 6,501 | 1,982 | Asphalt |
| 18/36 | 6,502 | 1,982 | Concrete |

Statistics
- Aircraft operations (2022): 17,868
- Based aircraft (2022): 128
- Passenger volume (12 months ending October 2024): 34,450
- Source: Federal Aviation Administration

Joplin Regional Airport (IATA: JLN, ICAO: KJLN, FAA LID: JLN) is located four miles (6.4 km) north of Joplin, in Jasper County, Missouri, United States. It has airline service, which is subsidized by the Essential Air Service program.

The Federal Aviation Administration (FAA) National Plan of Integrated Airport Systems for 2025–2029 categorized it as a non-hub primary commercial service facility.

== History ==
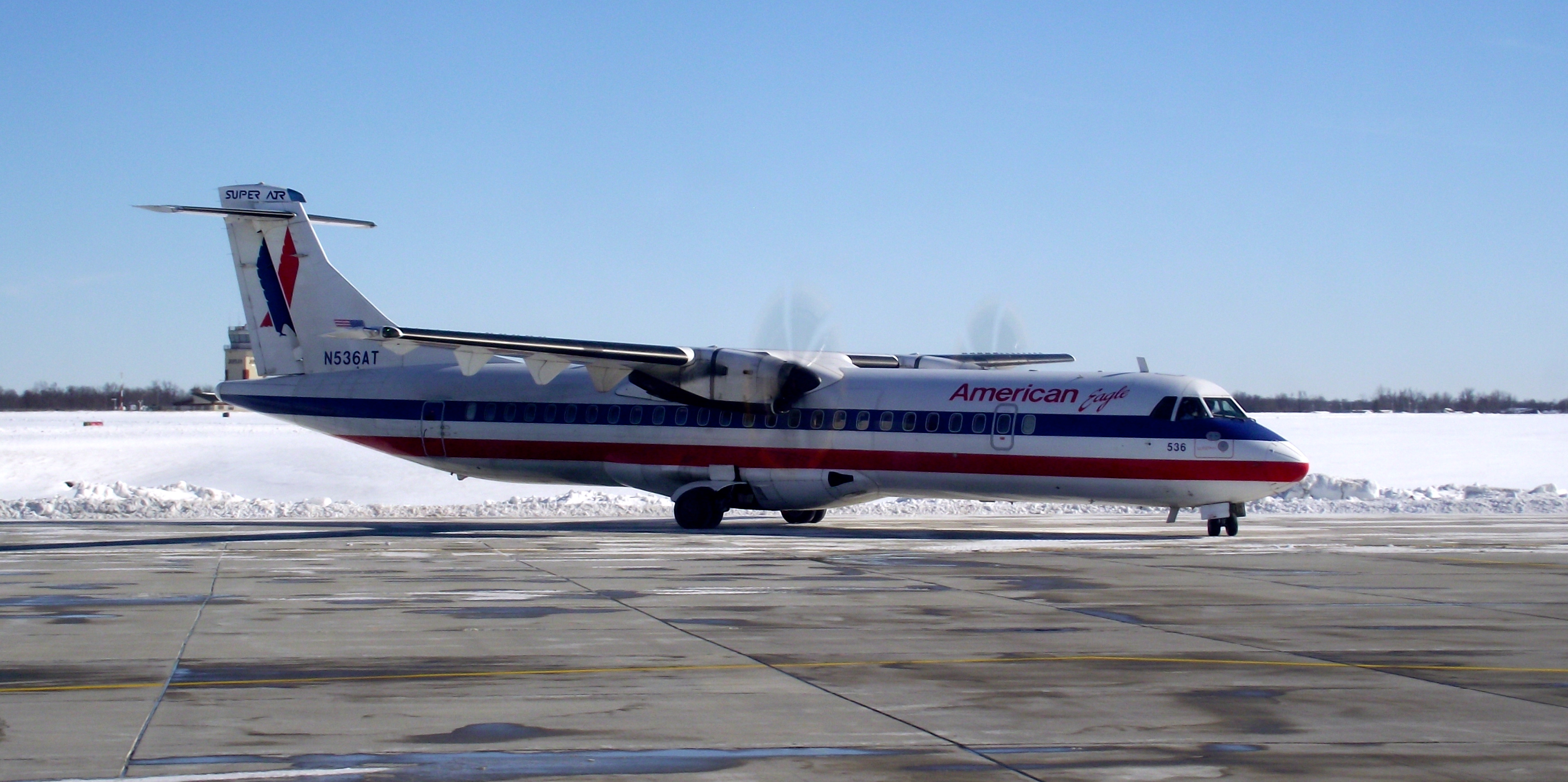
American Eagle ATR-72 arrives on American's inaugural flight to Joplin (2011).

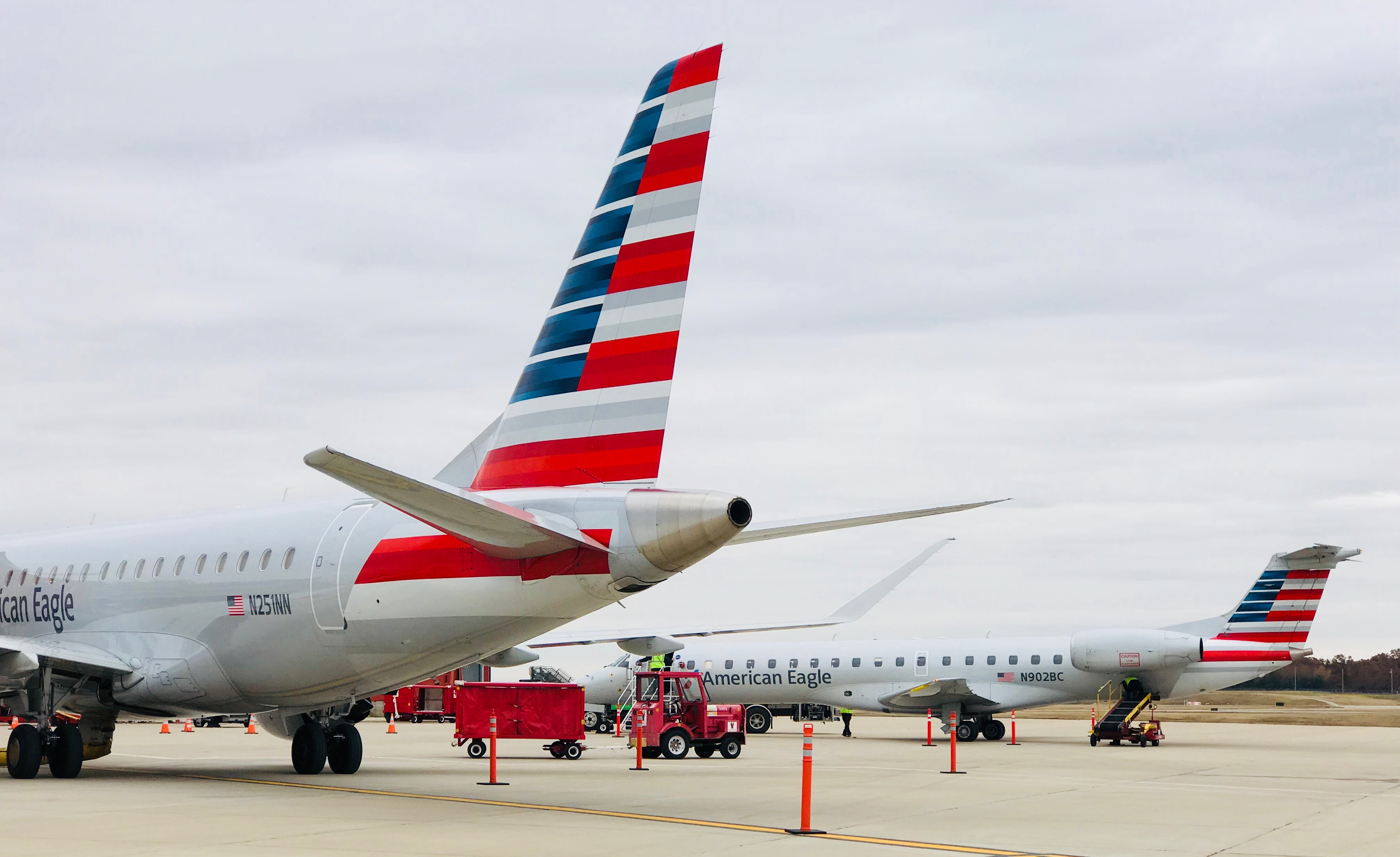
American Eagle Embraers await return to Dallas/Fort Worth (2017).

=== Historical airline service ===
American Airlines: Mid-1940s until 1963. Joplin was one of many stops on a route between Dallas and Chicago.

Ozark Airlines: 1950-1986 to Springfield, MO, St. Louis, Chicago, Tulsa, and Dallas/Fort Worth. Ozark began the first jets to Joplin in 1968 with the Douglas DC-9.

Central Airlines: 1955-1967 to Kansas City, Fayetteville, and Fort Smith. Central merged into Frontier Airlines in 1967.

Frontier Airlines: 1967-1984 to Kansas City, Fayetteville, AR, Fort Smith, Springfield, MO and Little Rock. Direct service to Denver began in 1978 using Boeing 737-200 jets.

Air Midwest (own branding): 1982-1986 and again 1989-1991 to Kansas City, Tulsa, Fayetteville, and Little Rock. Air Midwest also operated a series of major airline Codeshare agreements as noted below.

Resort Air: 1984-1985 to St. Louis. Became Trans World Express in 1985.

Scheduled Skyways: 1985 to Kansas City. Merged into Air Midwest in 1985.

Ozark Midwest: 1985-1986 to St. Louis. Operated by Air Midwest. Ozark merged into TWA in 1986.

Eastern Express: 1986-1988 to Kansas City. Operated by Air Midwest.

Braniff Express: 1988-1989 to Kansas City. Operated by Air Midwest.

USAir Express: 1991-1992 to Kansas City. Operated by Air Midwest.

Northwest Airlink: 1986-2002 to Memphis. Operated by Mesaba Airlines and Pinnacle Airlines.

Trans World Express: 1985-2001 to St. Louis. Operated by Resort Air which later changed to Trans States Airlines. TWA merged into American Airlines in 2001 providing American Connection service.

Lone Star Airlines: 1991-1995 to Dallas/Fort Worth, St. Louis, and Columbia, MO.

Ozark Airlines (second): 2000-2001 to Dallas/Fort Worth and Chicago-Midway (one stop at Columbia, MO).

American Connection: 2001-2006 to St. Louis (formerly Trans World Express). Operated by Trans States Airlines.

US Airways Express: 2006-2008 to Kansas City. Operated by Air Midwest

Mesa Airlines: October 5, 2006 through 2007 to Dallas/Fort Worth.

Great Lakes Airlines: 2008 through February 10, 2011 to Kansas City.

American Eagle: February 11, 2011 through May 31, 2021 to Dallas/Fort Worth. Flights to Chicago-O'Hare began on June 6, 2019 and were operated by Executive Airlines, American Eagle Airlines, Envoy Air, ExpressJet, Mesa Airlines, and SkyWest Airlines. American Eagle first began service with 64-passenger ATR-72 prop aircraft then upgraded with Regional Jets in 2012. All American Eagle service ended due to a significant drop in traffic caused by the Covid-19 pandemic.

United Express: June 1, 2021 - present to Denver, Chicago-O'Hare, and Houston Intercontinental. The Houston flights were dropped in late 2021.

Joplin had operated under the Essential Air Service program but graduated from the program in the 2010s after passenger traffic greatly increased with the American Eagle regional jet service. Joplin then returned to the EAS program after traffic dropped significantly with the COVID-19 pandemic in 2020.

On March 10, 2022, the current provider, SkyWest Airlines dba United Express, filed to withdraw service to Joplin and 28 other cities served under the EAS program, citing a shortage of pilots.

== Facilities ==
The airport covers 970 acres (390 ha) at an elevation of 978 feet (298 m). It has two runways: 13/31 is 6,501 by 150 feet (1,982 × 46 m) asphalt runway and 18/36 is 6,502 by 100 feet (1,982 × 30 m) concrete runway.

For the year ending December 31, 2022 the airport had 17,868 aircraft operations, an average of 49 per day: 86% general aviation, 13% air taxi, 1% military, and less than 1% airline. At that time, there were 128 aircraft based at this airport: 105 single-engine, 10 multi-engine, 8 jets, 2 helicopter and 3 ultralights.

The fixed-base operator (FBO) at Joplin Regional Airport is Mizzou Aviation, near the General Aviation terminal.

== Statistics ==
=== Carrier shares ===
Carrier shares: (November 2023 - October 2024)
| Carrier | Passengers (arriving and departing) |
|---|---|
| SkyWest Airlines | 34,450(100.00%) |

== See also ==
- List of airports in Missouri

== Other sources ==
- Essential Air Service documents (Docket OST-2006-23932) from the U.S. Department of Transportation:
  - Order 2006-5-11 (May 12, 2006): selecting Air Midwest, Inc., d/b/a US Airways Express, to provide essential air service at Joplin, Missouri, for a two-year period at a subsidy of $849,757 annually.
  - Order 2008-7-8 (July 3, 2008): selecting Great Lakes Airlines, Ltd. to provide subsidized essential air service (EAS) at Grand Island, Nebraska; Joplin, Missouri; El Dorado/Camden, Harrison, and Hot Springs, Arkansas; at a combined annual subsidy of $9,159,331 ($2,271,640 for Grand Island, $2,311,637 for El Dorado/Camden, $1,587,067 for Harrison, $1,991,307 for Hot Springs, and $997,680 for Joplin), for a two-year period beginning when Great Lakes inaugurates full EAS through the end of the 24th month thereafter.
  - Order 2010-9-9 (September 8, 2010): selecting Executive Airlines d/b/a American Eagle Airlines to provide essential air service (EAS) at Joplin, Missouri, for an annual subsidy of $2,778,756, for a two-year period beginning when the carrier inaugurates service.
