= Air Midwest =

US regional airline (1965–2008) bought by Mesa

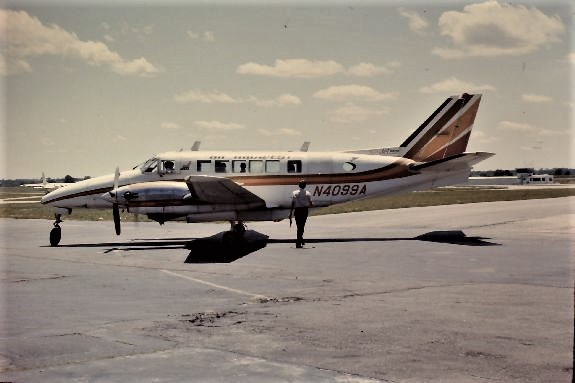
IATA	ICAO	Call sign
ZV	AMW	AIR MIDWEST
- Founded: 7 May 1965 (as Aviation Services)
- Commenced operations: 17 April 1967
- Ceased operations: 30 June 2008
- Hubs: Kansas City
- Frequent-flyer program: MesaMax
- Fleet size: See Fleet
- Destinations: See Destinations
- Parent company: Mesa Air Group, Inc.
- Headquarters: 2230 Air Cargo Rd; Wichita, Kansas
- Key people: Jonathan G. Ornstein (CEO); Michael J. Lotz (President & CFO)
- Founder: Gary Adamson (President)
- Website: mesa-air.com

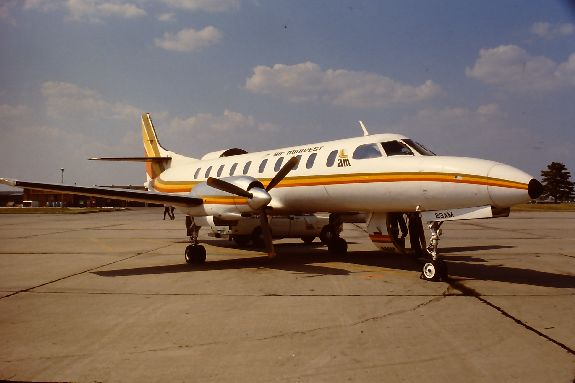
Metro Wichita 1979

Air Midwest, Inc., was a Federal Aviation Administration Part 121 certificated air carrier that operated under air carrier certificate number AMWA510A issued on May 15, 1965. It was headquartered in Wichita, Kansas, United States, and from 1991 was a subsidiary of Mesa Air Group. Besides initially flying as an independent air carrier, it later operated code sharing feeder flights on behalf of Eastern Air Lines as Eastern Air Midwest Express, on behalf of American Airlines as American Eagle, on behalf of Trans World Airlines (TWA) as Trans World Express and on behalf of US Airways as US Airways Express. It also operated feeder flights on behalf of Braniff (1983–1990) and Ozark Air Lines in addition to flying for Mesa Airlines. Air Midwest was shut down by its parent company, Mesa Airlines, in June 2008.

== History ==
Air Midwest was incorporated in Wichita, Kansas, on May 7, 1965, by Gary Adamson as Aviation Services Inc. Using a single Cessna 206, Adamson transported human remains for area mortuaries. Later, Aviation Services held out for charter and on April 17, 1967, began scheduled service flying between Wichita and Salina.

As Frontier Airlines downsized from the western Kansas market beginning in 1968, Aviation Services moved in to assume air service. In 1969, it changed its name to Air Midwest and ordered Beech 99 commuter turboprop aircraft to keep up with its expansion. In 1971, Frontier withdrew all service from Dodge City, Great Bend, and Hutchinson, KS allowing Air Midwest to assume service. In 1977, Frontier withdrew all service at Garden City, Goodland, and Hays, KS as well as Lamar, CO and Air Midwest began operating a fleet of six Swearingen Metroliner commuter propjets. By then Air Midwest was linking smaller cities throughout Kansas to Wichita, Kansas City, MO, and Denver, CO.

With airline deregulation in late 1978 Air Midwest saw many more expansion opportunities and made a bold move by ordering ten more Metroliners. On March 1, 1979, Air Midwest began operating several new routes in New Mexico formerly flown by Texas International Airlines. This new service to New Mexico was connected to the Kansas operations by serving Lubbock, Texas where Air Midwest partnered with Braniff Airways. From Lubbock, service was started to Hobbs, Roswell, Carlsbad, and Albuquerque, New Mexico as well as from Albuquerque to Clovis, NM. Service was also started from Lubbock, to Garden City, Dodge City, and Wichita, Kansas. In July 1979, service was inaugurated from Lubbock and Wichita, to Ponca City, Enid, and Oklahoma City, Oklahoma.

In 1980/1981 Air Midwest again expanded with new routes from Albuquerque to Alamogordo, Silver City, and Farmington, New Mexico as well as from Farmington to Phoenix, Arizona all formerly flown by the original Frontier Airlines (1950-1986). A new link to Wichita was also created via Clovis and Amarillo. Routes were also expanded from both the Kansas City International Airport and the Kansas City Downtown Airport to new cities in Nebraska, Iowa, Missouri, and Oklahoma.

In 1982 all Lubbock service was discontinued and transferred to Midland/Odessa, Texas until 1984 when all Midland/Odessa service ended.

In 1983 a marketing agreement was established with Frontier Airlines in which all Air Midwest flights at Denver would feed Frontier.

Beginning in 1984, competitor Mesa Airlines began aggressive expansion throughout New Mexico and Texas and Air Midwest made the decision to discontinue all routes in this area on January 31, 1986. They then shifted their focus to building newly acquired code share relationships with major airlines listed below. Also in 1984, Air Midwest was independently operating nonstop flights from St. Louis Downtown Airport (CPS) to Chicago Midway Airport (MDW), Kansas City Downtown Airport (MKC), and Olathe, KS (via Johnson County Industrial Airport (LXT)) with Metro propjets.

On May 1, 1985, Air Midwest merged with Scheduled Skyways, a Fayetteville, Arkansas-based commuter air carrier which later changed its name to Skyways, in hopes of gaining a codeshare to feed Republic Airlines' Memphis hub. Air Midwest would expand by acquiring routes in Arkansas to complement its existing routes in the midwest. Both carriers operated Metro propjets, and Air Midwest had an opportunity to win a codeshare agreement with Republic. However, Republic then picked a different air carrier to feed its Memphis hub. Meanwhile, Air Midwest subsequently discovered many hidden problems with the neglected fleet inherited from Scheduled Skyways, forcing the airline to perform a great deal of maintenance to keep the aircraft flying. The merger with Scheduled Skyways pushed Air Midwest to the verge of bankruptcy over the few years that followed.

On April 1, 1985, Air Midwest introduced the 30-seat Saab 340 turboprop aircraft with flights from Kansas City to Wichita, Omaha, and Manhattan, KS. By the end of 1985 the airline was operating five Saab 340's and 24 Metroliners.

Although Air Midwest was unsuccessful in gaining a codeshare with Republic through the Scheduled Skyways merger, it was able to acquire codeshare agreements in 1985 with Eastern Airlines as Eastern Air Midwest Express at the Kansas City and Wichita hubs and in 1986 with Ozark Air Lines as Ozark Midwest at that carriers' St. Louis hub, as well as with American Airlines as part of the American Eagle (airline brand) at their newly created Nashville hub.

Continuing money problems forced Air Midwest to sell its Nashville hub and Saab 340 aircraft to American in 1987. Trans World Airlines (TWA) acquired Ozark Air Lines in 1986 and forced Air Midwest to surrender some of its St Louis routes because TWA already had a code share partner in St Louis, Resort Air (later Trans States Airlines). At the end of 1989, Air Midwest was operating Trans World Express service on behalf of TWA at its St. Louis hub with nonstop flights to Birmingham, AL; Bloomington, IL; Cape Girardeau, MO; Cedar Rapids, IA; Champaign, IL; Decatur, IL; Evansville, IN; Fayetteville, AR; Fort Leonard Wood, MO; Knoxville, TN; Lexington, KY; Marion, IL; Paducah, KY; Quincy, IL; Rochester, MN; South Bend, IN; Topeka, KS and Waterloo, IA operated with Jetstream 31, Embraer EMB-120 Brasilia, Fairchild Swearingen Metroliner and Saab 340 turboprops. By 1990, the airline had added Trans World Express service between St. Louis and Fort Smith, AR; Manhattan, KS and Salina, KS.

By June 1988, Air Midwest had built up the Kansas City hub with 89 flights per day to 20 cities, all operating as Eastern Express. Eastern then abruptly downsized its Kansas City hub operation thus leaving Air Midwest with no one to connect passenger traffic to. Air Midwest quickly negotiated a codeshare agreement with the second incarnation of Braniff (1983-1990), as Braniff was now building up Kansas City as a hub. The Braniff Express operation took over by October 1, 1988, however, just over one year later, Braniff once again went into bankruptcy and suspended operations on November 6, 1989.

After the collapse of Braniff, Air Midwest went back to operating under their own branding at Kansas City until yet another new codeshare agreement was negotiated, this time with USAir to feed their small Kansas City hub as USAir Express beginning on January 15, 1991. USAir changed its name to US Airways in 1997 and the US Airways Express operation at Kansas City continued until June 30, 2008.

Mesa Airlines began attempts to purchase Air Midwest in 1989. It succeeded in 1991 and replaced the Air Midwest metroliner fleet with newly acquired Beechcraft 1900D aircraft. In 2001 all Mesa Airlines flights operating with Beech 1900D's at the Albuquerque and Phoenix hubs were transferred to the Air Midwest certificate.

A book on the history of Air Midwest entitled "Pioneer of the Third Level" was written by Dr. Imre E. Quastler, an authority on regional airlines. This book thoroughly covers the early years of Air Midwest from 1965 through 1980.

=== Operations under Mesa Air Group ===
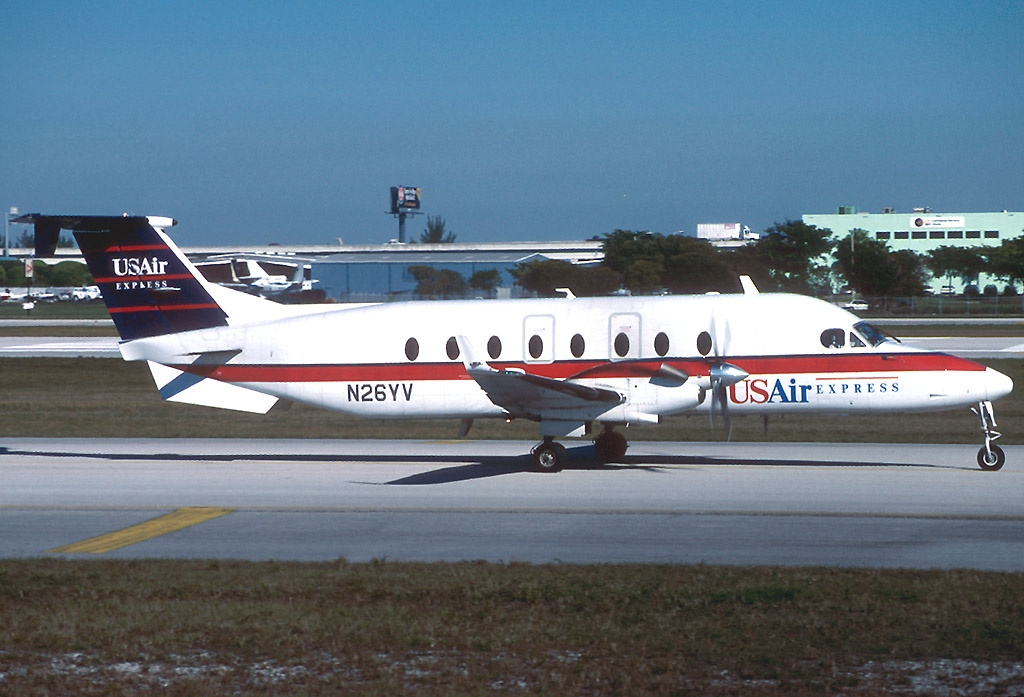
Beech 1900D in US Air Express livery, Fort Lauderdale 1997

Mesa Air Group acquired Air Midwest in 1991. From 1991 until 1997, Air Midwest operated twelve Beechcraft 1900C commuter turboprops flying from its Kansas City hub as USAir Express. In 1997, Mesa Air Group underwent a corporate reorganization: Mesa Airline's FloridaGulf, Liberty Express, and Independent divisions were merged into Air Midwest.

Air Midwest operated to many smaller cities for Essential Air Service including an America West Express operation in Phoenix and Las Vegas under an agreement with America West Airlines. Also independent operations were run as Mesa Airlines brand with divisions out of Albuquerque, Chicago, and Dallas/Fort Worth. The America West Express operation was transferred to US Airways Express with the merger of America West and US Airways in 2007. Air Midwest further operated as US Airways Express at the major carriers' hubs in Charlotte, Philadelphia, and Pittsburgh and with smaller operations at Omaha, Little Rock, and New Orleans.

On January 8, 2003, Air Midwest had its first fatal accident when Air Midwest Flight 5481 operating as US Airways Express and departing out of Charlotte for Greenville-Spartanburg crashed 37 seconds after takeoff. All 19 passengers and two crewmembers were killed in the accident.

For a period of three weeks in August 2006, Air Midwest operated as Delta Connection, flying three Beechcraft 1900D from John F. Kennedy Airport to Providence, Rhode Island, and Windsor Locks, Connecticut, as a stop-gap measure for Freedom Airlines, another subsidiary of Mesa Air Group, until it was relieved by Chautauqua Airlines.

On February 1, 2007, Air Midwest began operations at Chicago Midway International Airport in Chicago, Illinois, to three Illinois airports: Decatur, Marion, and Quincy. However, just nine months after beginning this service, Mesa Airlines announced that Air Midwest would end all service from Illinois on November 9, 2007.

In May 2007, Air Midwest, operating as America West Express on behalf of America West Airlines, requested that the FAA allow it to withdraw service from the regional airport in Vernal, Utah, (a service that had started only one year prior) as soon as a replacement carrier was approved. On Oct. 4, 2007, the federal Department of Transportation announced that Great Lakes Airlines would replace Air Midwest as the Essential Air Service carrier at the Utah airports in Vernal and Moab. At the same time, the Department of Transportation announced that SkyWest Airlines would replace Air Midwest as the Essential Air Service carrier at Cedar City.

A report published in The Wall Street Journal on January 14, 2008, included a statement from Mesa CEO Jonathan G. Ornstein that the company had decided to shut down Air Midwest, citing significant losses stemming from increased maintenance and fuel costs. All cities served by Air Midwest received notices of intention to end service, except for Prescott and Kingman, Arizona. Mesa later announced plans to completely shut down the Air Midwest subsidiary, with all services to be terminated by June 30, 2008. At the time of its shutdown, there were 20 airplanes in service, down from a high of 118.

The last two flights flown by Air Midwest were Flights 4679 and Flights 4681. Both departed on June 30, 2008, at 10:40pm from Kansas City International (MCI) to Joplin, Missouri (flt. 4679) and Columbia, Missouri (flt. 4681).

== MesaMax ==
MesaMax applied to Mesa Airlines flights that were operated by Air Midwest. It consisted of a card, upon which flights were recorded with a stamp. Once 16 stamps had been recorded, the card could have been redeemed for a single round-trip ticket on Mesa Airlines flights.

== Fleet ==
World Airline Fleets 1979 (copyright 1979) shows Air Midwest with:

- 5 Swearingen Metroliner II
- 1 Cessna 206

1987-88 World Airline Fleets (copyright 1987) shows Air Midwest with:

- 4 Embraer EMB-120
- 5 Saab 340
- 51 Swearingen Metroliner II

JP fleets 1989 (copyright May 1989) shows Air Midwest with:

- 13 Embraer EMB-120/120RT
- 7 Saab 340
- 34 Swearingen Metroliner II/IIA/III

As of February 2008, Air Midwest operated the following turboprop aircraft type:

Air Midwest Fleet
Aircraft	Total	Passengers	Routes
Beechcraft 1900D	11	19	All

Other aircraft operated by Air Midwest included:

- Beechcraft 99
- Beechcraft 1900C
- British Aerospace BAe Jetstream 31
- Cessna 402

All of the above are twin turboprop aircraft with the exception of the Cessna 206 which is a single-engined piston aircraft and the Cessna 402 which is a twin engine piston powered aircraft.

== Destinations ==
=== In 1970 ===
Air Midwest was serving the following destinations as an independent commuter air carrier in 1970:

- Colby, KS
- Colorado Springs, CO
- Denver, CO
- Dodge City, KS
- Garden City, KS
- Great Bend, KS
- Hays, KS
- Hutchinson, KS
- Kansas City, MO - Focus city
- Liberal, KS
- Omaha, NE
- Pueblo, CO
- Topeka, KS
- Wichita, KS - Hub & airline headquarters

=== From 1979 through early 1985 ===
Air Midwest independently served the following destinations between 1979 and early 1985 (prior to the merger with Skyways) with all flights being operated with Fairchild Swearingen Metroliner (Metro II SA-226 model) commuter propjets at this time:

- Alamogordo, NM
- Albuquerque, NM - Focus city
- Amarillo, TX
- Carlsbad, NM
- Clovis, NM
- Columbia, MO
- Denver, CO - Focus city
- Des Moines, IA
- Dodge City, KS
- Enid, OK
- Farmington, NM
- Garden City, KS
- Goodland, KS
- Grand Island, NE
- Great Bend, KS
- Hays, KS
- Hobbs, NM
- Hutchinson, KS
- Joplin, MO
- Kansas City, MO - Kansas City Downtown Airport - Focus airport
- Kansas City, MO - Kansas City International Airport - Hub
- Lamar, CO
- Liberal, KS
- Lincoln, NE
- Lubbock, TX
- Manhattan, KS
- Midland/Odessa, TX
- Minneapolis/St. Paul, MN
- Moline, IL
- Oklahoma City, OK
- Omaha, NE
- Parsons, KS
- Phoenix, AZ
- Ponca City, OK
- Roswell, NM
- St. Louis, MO
- Salina, KS
- Silver City, NM
- Sioux City, IA
- Springfield, MO
- Topeka, KS
- Tulsa, OK
- Wichita, KS - Hub & airline headquarters

In 1984 Air Midwest briefly operated new service from the St. Louis Downtown Airport to Chicago, IL (via Midway Airport), and Olathe, KS (via Johnson County Industrial Airport) outside Kansas City, as well as the Kansas City Downtown Airport.

== Incidents and accidents ==
- May 24, 1984, Air Midwest Flight 513 - a Fairchild Swearingen Metroliner model SA-226AC Metro II en route from the Roswell International Air Center in Roswell, New Mexico to the Albuquerque International Sunport was forced to make a belly landing at Albuquerque after the right main landing gear would not lock into position. All 15 passengers and the two pilots deplaned with no injuries.
- January 8, 2003, Air Midwest Flight 5481 - a Beechcraft 1900D operated by Air Midwest as US Airways Express under a franchise agreement, crashed into an airport hangar and burst into flames 37 seconds after leaving Charlotte Douglas International Airport in Charlotte, North Carolina, for Greenville-Spartanburg International Airport near Greer, South Carolina. All 19 passengers and two pilots aboard died in the accident.

== See also ==
- List of defunct airlines of the United States

== Bibliography ==
- Quastler, I.E. (1980). Pioneer of the third level-A history of Air Midwest. San Diego (CALIF.): Commuter Airlines Press. ISBN 9780960255412.
- Quastler, I.E. (1985). Air Midwest: The first 20 years. San Diego (CALIF.): Airline Press of California. ISBN 9780960255429.
