= Mesa Air Group =

Commercial aviation holding company

Mesa Air Group, Inc.
- Type: Public
- Traded as: Nasdaq: MESA; Russell 2000 Index component
- Industry: Aviation
- Founded: 1980; 46 years ago
- Defunct: November 25, 2025; 7 months ago (merged into Republic Airways Holdings)
- Headquarters: Phoenix, Arizona, United States
- Key people: Jonathan G. Ornstein (chairman & CEO); Michael J. Lotz (president); Torque Zubeck (CFO); Bradford Rich (executive vice president & COO); Brian Gillman (executive vice president, general counsel and secretary)
- Revenue: ▲$1.4 billion USD (2007)
- Owner: United Airlines Holdings (9.9%)
- Number of employees: ~3,600 (2022)
- Website: mesa-air.com

Mesa Air Group, Inc. is a Nevada Corporation commercial aviation holding company with headquarters at 410 North 44th Street, Suite 700 in the Camelback East area of Phoenix, Arizona, United States. The company operates one regional airline subsidiary: Mesa Airlines which operates as United Express and (until 2023) as American Eagle under contractual agreements with United Airlines and American Airlines respectively.

Mesa was founded on a mesa in Farmington, New Mexico in 1982 by Larry and Janie Risley, a husband and wife team that mortgaged their home to finance their dream to own an airline. Mesa moved its headquarters to Phoenix, Arizona in 1998.

As of June 2022, Mesa operated 167 aircraft, with more than 457 daily departures to 120 cities throughout the U.S., District of Columbia, Canada, Mexico, The Bahamas, and Cuba.

== Subsidiaries ==
=== Airlines ===
- Mesa Airlines, Inc.

=== Former airlines and subsidiaries ===
- Air Midwest
- Freedom Airlines, Inc.
- CalPac (California Pacific)
- CCAir
- Desert Sun Airlines
- FloridaGulf Airlines
- go!
- Liberty Express Airlines
- Mountain West Airlines
- Skyway Airlines
- Superior Airlines
- WestAir Holdings, Inc. and WestAir Commuter Airlines
- Desert Turbine Services
- Four Corners Aviation
- Mesa Leasing, Inc.
- San Juan Pilot Training

== History ==
Mesa began in 1980 when JB Aviation, a fixed-base operator at the Four Corners Regional Airport in Farmington, NM, established a charter flight department and Mesa Air Shuttle with scheduled commuter airline service from Farmington to Albuquerque using a five-seat single-engine Piper Saratoga aircraft. A nine-seat Piper Navajo was later added for new service between Farmington and Denver. In late 1981, the Denver flights were discontinued and a new route from Farmington to Grand Junction, CO, and Vernal, UT, was briefly added. In 1982, using $140,000 in capital, Larry Risley, an A&P mechanic with JB Aviation, and his wife Janie, purchased the airline; by mid 1983, they acquired their first 14-seat Beechcraft 99 turboprop commuter airliner. New service from Albuquerque to Durango, CO, began with the arrival of the second Beech 99 later that year. More Beech 99's were acquired and the company continued to expand from Albuquerque to other cities throughout New Mexico as well as Lubbock, TX.

During its first few years, Mesa found itself in a very competitive environment. Six other carriers competed against Mesa: Air Midwest, Sun West Airlines, Pioneer Airlines, Trans-Colorado Airlines, Airways of New Mexico, and JetAire. As fare wars erupted between the carriers, Mesa was able to survive due to its low cost structure. It performed maintenance in house, many of Mesa's employees performed multiple duties: pilots and mechanics doubled as gate agents and ramp agents.

In 1984, the Civil Aeronautics Board awarded Mesa its first Essential Air Service (EAS) contract, to serve Roswell, Hobbs, and Carlsbad, winning the contract from Air Midwest. A second round of EAS bidding resulted in Mesa winning contracts to serve Silver City, Alamogordo, Las Cruces, Clovis, and Gallup.

By late 1985, Mesa acquired its first Beechcraft 1900 turboprop and began the first scheduled air service to Telluride, CO, as that aircraft had the performance to serve the city's airport which sits at more than 9000 feet above sea level. Service was also added to high altitude Angel Fire, NM, a year later.

By 1987, Mesa had grown from six employees in 1982 to 187 employees; its fleet grew from a single Piper Saratoga in 1980 to one Piper Chieftain and three Beechcraft 99s in 1984 to five Beechcraft 99 and four Beechcraft 1900 turboprops. Of the six competing air carriers, none remained to challenge Mesa in New Mexico by the end of 1987. The airline had built up its Albuquerque hub to 45 departures per day serving 17 cities and providing hourly service to Farmington.

Mesa continued to grow in 1987. It listed on Nasdaq: MESA with an initial public offering of 865,000 shares of stock at $7.50. While it was now operating to all the primary cities in New Mexico, it then expanded outside of the state by acquiring routes in Wyoming, Utah, and Colorado from Centennial Airlines as well as adding nonstop flights from Roswell, NM, to DFW. Mesa then acquired a pair of 9-seat Cessna Caravans to serve even smaller cities in New Mexico and established new routes from Albuquerque to Taos and Ruidoso.

To provide a pool of qualified pilots, Mesa established an ab-initio flight training program in 1989 with San Juan College, a local community college.

=== Acquisitions and mergers ===
Starting in 1989, Mesa embarked on a series of acquisitions and mergers over the next six years.

In February 1989, Mesa negotiated its first codeshare agreement with Midwest Express and established Skyway Airlines in Milwaukee. In July 1989, StatesWest Airlines failed to take over Mesa by making an offer to purchase all of its common operating stock.

In February 1990, Mesa acquired Aspen Airways' United Express Denver hub, routes, and assets, and negotiated a codeshare agreement with United Airlines. Using these newly acquired routes, Mesa set up a Denver hub flying as United Express. Aspen Airways' BAe 146 and Convair 580 aircraft and its Denver-Aspen route were sold to Air Wisconsin.

Mesa had many changes in 1991; acquiring Air Midwest, its Kansas City hub and a codeshare agreement with USAir Express in July, starting FloridaGulf Airlines serving Florida, South Carolina, Georgia, Alabama, Arkansas, and Louisiana from its Tampa hub under a USAir Express codeshare in December. It was also in talks to acquire WestAir Commuter Airlines.

In 1992, Mesa completed acquisition of WestAir Commuter Airlines and its hubs in San Francisco, Los Angeles, Portland, and Seattle as well as its United codeshare. In October 1992, Mesa negotiated a codeshare agreement with America West for its Phoenix hub to be operated as America West Express.

In 1993, Mesa's codeshare with Midwest Express expired. Midwest Express kept the name Skyway for its future regional of the same name. Using the aircraft from the former Skyway operation, Mesa established Superior Airlines with a Columbus hub operating as America West Express. Mesa created CalPac (California Pacific) with a Los Angeles hub operating as United Express. Both Superior and CalPac were short-lived operations, with both airlines being folded back into Mesa Airlines United Express operations.

In 1994, Mesa acquired Pittsburgh-based Crown Airways. Using the assets from Crown Airways, Mesa set up Liberty Express Airlines with a Pittsburgh hub operating as USAir Express.

In March 1995, Mesa took delivery of its first two regional jets, the Fokker 70, a smaller version of the Fokker 100 jetliner. Mesa created Desert Sun Airlines and operated the two jets from a Phoenix hub to Des Moines and Spokane as America West Express.

=== Reorganization ===
As Mesa acquired air carriers or expanded by creating new airlines, it grew in a seemingly haphazard manner. From 1989 through 1995, Mesa had grown from one airline with hubs in Albuquerque, Denver, and Phoenix to six separate airlines with hubs throughout the country, though it had as many as eight airlines prior to 1995. Rather than integrating each new acquisition and airline into one integrated company, Mesa continued operating each individual airline independently, with separate labor groups, separate flight, maintenance, and marketing operations, and separate codeshare agreements. This resulted in an unwieldy corporate structure.

In 1992, Mesa created Mesa Holdings Corp to manage the existing Mesa Airlines and its acquisitions. It resulted in the following subsidiaries:

- Air Midwest (Kansas City)
- Mesa Airlines
  - America West Express (Phoenix)
  - FloridaGulf Airlines (Tampa)
  - Mesa Airlines (Albuquerque)
  - United Express (Denver)
- Skyway Airlines (Milwaukee)
- WestAir Commuter Airlines (Los Angeles, San Francisco, Portland, and Seattle)
- San Juan Pilot Training (forerunner to Mesa Pilot Development)
- Desert Turbine Services

In 1995, Mesa Holdings Corp was renamed Mesa Air Group, and Mesa Airlines was renamed Mountain West Airlines. Mesa Air Group now consisted of the following six airlines and subsidiaries:

- Air Midwest (Kansas City/USAir Express)
- Desert Sun Airlines (Phoenix/America West Express)
- FloridaGulf Airlines (Tampa, Orlando, New Orleans, Boston, Philadelphia/USAir Express)
- Liberty Express Airlines (Pittsburgh/USAir Express)
- Mountain West Airlines, operating as:
  - Mesa Airlines (Albuquerque)
  - United Express (Denver, Los Angeles (former CalPac), Portland, Seattle)
  - America West Express (Phoenix)
- WestAir Commuter Airlines (Los Angeles, San Francisco, Portland, Seattle/United Express)
- Desert Turbine Services
- Four Corners Aviation
- Mesa Pilot Development
- Regional Aircraft Services

In 1996, further company reorganization consolidated the separate flight dispatch functions of Desert Sun, FloridaGulf, and Mountain West airlines into one location in Farmington. All flight training facilities and human resources were centralized in Fort Worth. Since the mergers had created a diverse mix of aircraft types, Mesa proceeded to simplify the number of aircraft types operated from six (Short 360, British Aerospace BAe Jetstream 31, Embraer EMB-120 Brasilia, Beechcraft 1900, de Havilland Canada DHC-8 Dash 8, Fokker 70) to three (B1900, Dash 8, Canadair CRJ). Mesa relocated aircraft to place all airplanes of the same type in a base, with the Jetstreams and Brasilias flying in the West and the B1900s flying elsewhere. This also allowed the consolidation of maintenance facilities, since the facilities no longer needed to service all the different types of aircraft Mesa operated. To replace the Fokker aircraft, Mesa signed an agreement with Bombardier to purchase 16 Canadair Regional Jets (CRJ) with options for 32 more.

The six pilot groups had voted to unionize in 1994. In 1996, the pilot groups of the six airlines were merged into one common seniority list, and under the Air Line Pilots Association (ALPA) representation, the pilots and Mesa negotiated and ratified a five-year collective bargaining agreement.

When Mesa started taking deliveries of the CRJ in 1997, it returned to two Fokker 70 jets and placed the CRJs in service in Phoenix. Mesa started an independent hub providing CRJ service from Fort Worth Meacham to Houston, San Antonio, Austin, and from Colorado Springs to Nashville and San Antonio. This effort proved to be unsuccessful and the service from Fort Worth ended in less than a year.

=== Difficulties and loss of the United codeshare ===
Mesa and United entered into discussions in July 1997 to renew WestAir's codeshare agreement, which was due to expire in May 1998. Mesa and United could not agree on new terms. As negotiations delayed into the summer, United started awarding WestAir's routes to SkyWest Airlines. Finally with negotiations at an impasse, United announced in November 1997 that it would not renew the codeshare with WestAir. Mesa attempted to reengage United and ask United to reconsider to no avail.

Mesa experienced many customer complaints regarding its Denver United Express operation. The level of complaints resulted in a Congressional inquiry of the airline's performance. Mesa experienced increased costs the Denver hub as a result of moving from Denver Stapleton airport to the new Denver International Airport and as a result of a decrease in the average fare Mesa received from United. In efforts to reduce its exposure to the high costs and mounting losses, Mesa announced that it would reduce and terminate service from its Denver hub in September 1997. United charged that the reduction and termination of service was a material breach of the codeshare agreement. Naturally Mesa disagreed. Again, as with WestAir, agreement could not be reached and United and Mesa mutually agreed to terminate the codeshare.

The effect of the codeshare termination with WestAir and Mesa was immediate. The termination put 87 (21 Jetstreams, 29 Brasilias, and 37 Beech 1900s) of Mesa's 184 aircraft out of service or 47% of its total aircraft. Mesa took immediate steps, parking the Jetstreams and Brasilias. It sold 10 Brasilias to Skywest. Mesa exercised the option to purchase 16 additional CRJs and traded in the remaining Brasilias to Bombardier for CRJs. Mesa sold 24 Beech 1900s to Great Lakes, and returned the remaining Beech 1900s to Beechcraft/Raytheon. WestAir ceased operations in 1998.

Mesa experienced difficulties with its other two codeshares as well. Flight crew shortages and scheduling problems resulted in the cancellation of many flights. From October 1997 to January 1998, Mesa parked aircraft and canceled flights to alleviate the crew shortage problem. Part of the crew shortage problem was related to the consolidation of flight operations in Farmington, and the training associated with transitioning the air carrier from a Part 135 operator to a Part 121 operator as required by a FAA mandate. America West canceled its codeshare with Mesa in 1997.

=== Turnaround ===
In 1998, Jonathan Ornstein was appointed CEO of Mesa Air Group. Ornstein had been Risley's assistant from 1989 to 1995 during Mesa's initial expansion. Larry Risley remained on Mesa's board of directors. All corporate officers were replaced and the company headquarters was relocated from Farmington to Phoenix. The flight training and human resources departments were also moved to Phoenix. Its plan to return to profitability focused on several fronts: its aircraft, codeshares, and customer service.

One of Mesa's problems during the turnaround was its fleet of over 180 turboprops. It began consolidating all of its remaining Beechcraft 1900 turboprops into Air Midwest, completed in 2000. It embarked on a plan to reequip with jet aircraft. In 1999, Mesa arranged to purchase 36 Embraer 145 jets with options for 64 additional ERJs. In 2001, Mesa arranged to purchase 20 CRJ-700s and 20 CRJ-900s with options for 80 additional CRJ-700/900s. Five of the CRJ-700 orders were subsequently converted to CRJ-900s. As Mesa took delivery of the larger CRJ-700s and CRJ-900s, scope restrictions with US Airways prevented Mesa from operating the larger aircraft in its Mesa Airlines subsidiary. Mesa created a separate subsidiary, called Freedom Airlines to operate these aircraft. As the scope restriction at US Airways was removed during US Airways' bankruptcy reorganization and after Mesa settled with its pilot union regarding operating Freedom as a separate air carrier, Freedom's aircraft and pilots were merged back into Mesa Airlines in 2003.

As Mesa completed its restructuring, it proceeded to reestablish codeshares. In 1998, it negotiated a new codeshare with America West and expanded its existing one with USAir. In 2001, Mesa reestablished a codeshare agreement with Midwest Express for its Air Midwest Kansas City hub. Also that same year, Mesa negotiated an agreement with Frontier to operate as Frontier JetExpress out of Denver. The Frontier codeshare ended in 2003. In 2003, Mesa reestablished a codeshare agreement with United, operating as United Express. In 2005, Mesa negotiated a codeshare agreement with Delta for Freedom Airlines to operate as a Delta Connection carrier.

By 1999, Mesa returned to profitability. Mesa acquired CCAir and its USAir Express codeshare in 1999. It continued to operate CCAir as a separate operation. By 2002, CCAir ceased operations due to high costs and its assets and employees were absorbed into Mesa. The latest merger attempt was in 2003, when Mesa offered to acquire Atlantic Coast Airlines. Its offer was refused, and ACA went on to operate independently as Independence Air and later ceased operations in January, 2006. In 2006, Mesa began operating in Hawaii under the brand go! and established a codeshare agreement with Mokulele Airlines, where Mokulele will operate as a go! Express carrier.

=== Hawaiian market entrance and related lawsuits ===
In 2004, Mesa Air Group met with Hawaiian Airlines and Aloha Airlines, both in bankruptcy at the time, and reviewed operational records and forecasts, but ultimately decided not to acquire or invest in either carrier. In 2006, after Mesa announced plans for its "go!" sub-branded airline in Hawaii, Hawaiian Airlines sued to block the launch, claiming that Mesa had violated a confidentiality agreement. Aloha Airlines filed a similar suit against Mesa later that year.

In September 2007, the CFO of Mesa Air Group was placed on administrative suspension as irregularities were investigated during the Hawaiian Airlines case. In an announcement, Mesa Air Group CEO Jonathan Ornstein assured shareholders and investors that "the alleged misconduct does not involve the financial controls, financial statements or operations of the Company." The judge overseeing the Mesa go! case, however, ruled Mesa destroyed evidence. and ordered Mesa Air Group to pay an $80 million interest bearing settlement with interest, along with legal fees, to Hawaiian Airlines.

Aloha Airlines ceased operations in March 2008, and the Aloha Airlines suit was settled in November 2008. Mesa agreed to pay $2 million, 10% of Mesa's common stock, and provide travel benefits on go! for former Aloha employees. Initially the settlement agreement included a provision whereby Mesa Air Group could license the Aloha name, but a federal judge rejected that agreement on the basis of Mesa's alleged misconduct in the Hawaii market.

=== Mokulele acquisition ===
In October 2009, it was announced Mesa Air Group's subsidiary "go!" would be taking over all of the Hawaii flying done by Mokulele Airlines and R.A.H.'s Shuttle America. The combine operation was rebranded as go! Mokulele. Mokulele operated a fleet of 4 Cessna Caravan aircraft that were retained in the combined operation, but the Embraer 170 aircraft operated by Shuttle America on behalf of Mokulele were removed from Hawaii service.

=== Bankruptcy filing ===
On January 5, 2010, Mesa Air Group filed for Chapter 11 bankruptcy protection in a New York City bankruptcy court. The company indicated that it will continue operations as normal. The company's Go! Mokulele subsidiary was not included in the filing, Per bankruptcy records, upon Mesa Air Group's exit from bankruptcy, US Airways Group will own a 10 percent stake in the operation. The company emerged from bankruptcy protection on March 1, 2011, as a privately held company with a new board of directors and having eliminated 100 excess aircraft.

=== Mokulele divestiture ===
In December 2011, it was announced Mesa Air Group had divested itself of Mokulele's Cessna Caravan aircraft and operations. In June 2012, Mesa began the process of dropping the "go! Mokulele" name and reverting to "go!".

=== Merger with Republic Airways ===
On April 7, 2025, Republic Airways Holdings announced that it would acquire Mesa in an all-stock merger. Under the terms of the agreement, Republic shareholders will own approximately 88% of the merged company, while Mesa shareholders will retain between 6% and 12%. The merger is expected to close in the third or fourth quarter of 2025, pending approval from shareholders and regulators.

Following the merger, the combined company will operate approximately 310 Embraer 170/175 aircraft and more than 1,250 daily departures. Republic will continue operating under agreements with American Airlines, Delta Air Lines, and United Airlines, while Mesa will fly under a 10-year agreement with United.

Prior to the merger, Mesa had scaled back its operations to about 60 Embraer 175 aircraft, all of which were leased from United. The merger would leave Republic and SkyWest Airlines as the two largest remaining independent regional airlines in the United States.

On November 25, 2025, Republic Airways Holdings Inc., then the parent company of Republic, announced that the transaction had been completed.

== Labor groups ==
Mesa Air Group labor groups are represented by several labor organizations:

- Flight attendants are represented by the Association of Flight Attendants (AFA). Its contract became amendable in June 2006. Mesa and its flight attendants are currently in contract negotiations.
- Pilots from its three airline subsidiaries are merged in a single common seniority list and are represented by the Air Line Pilots Association (ALPA). Its contract was ratified in December 2008 and becomes amenable in December 2010.

== Mesa Angels Foundation ==
Mesa Air Group, Inc. sponsors the Mesa Angels Foundation which provides financial assistance to those Mesa employees and immediate family members in critical financial need due to extraordinary circumstances such as medical emergencies, natural disasters or other unforeseen life-changing events. Mesa Angels Foundation also supports charitable organizations through donations in the communities Mesa serves.

== Sources ==
- Graham, Rex (March 1, 1987). "And the Winner Is ...". New Mexico Business Journal. 11 (3): 17.
- Marcial, Gene (July 17, 1989). "Is Mesa Airlines Facing a Dogfight?". BusinessWeek (3115). McGraw-Hill, Inc.: 130.
- "Mesa, Air Wisconsin to Split Aspen Airways Service". Aviation Daily. 299 (35). McGraw-Hill, Inc.: 347 February 20, 1990.
- Henderson, Danna (September 1, 1990). "Mesa Airlines Embraces Code Sharing". Air Transport World (178). Penton Publishing Inc.
- "Mesa To Consolidate Operations Under Holding Company". Aviation Daily. 307 (2). McGraw Hill, Inc.: 11 March 1, 1992.
- Kidder, Peabody & Co. Inc. (September 13, 1991), Mesa Airlines Company Report 1991, The Investext Group
- Prudential Securities, Inc. (May 3, 1992), Mesa Airlines Company Report 1992, The Investext Group
- First Boston Credit Suisse (August 4, 1993), Mesa Airlines Company Report 1993, The Investext Group
- Mesa Air Group (December 15, 1995), 1995 Annual Report
- Mesa Air Group (December 26, 1996), 1996 Annual Report
- Mesa Air Group (January 13, 1998), 1997 Annual Report
- Mesa Air Group (December 17, 1998), 1998 Annual Report
- Mesa Air Group (December 31, 1999), 1999 Annual Report
- Mesa Air Group (December 26, 2000), 2000 Annual Report
- Mesa Air Group (November 12, 2001), 2001 Annual Report
- Mesa Air Group (December 6, 2002), 2002 Annual Report
- Mesa Air Group (December 8, 2003), 2003 Annual Report
- Mesa Air Group (December 1, 2004), 2004 Annual Report
- Mesa Air Group (December 1, 2005), 2005 Annual Report
