= Freedom Airlines =

| IATA | ICAO | Call sign |
|---|---|---|
| F8 | FRL | FREEDOM AIR |
- Founded: 2002; 24 years ago
- Ceased operations: 2010; 16 years ago
- Hubs: Cincinnati/Northern Kentucky International Airport
- Frequent-flyer program: SkyMiles
- Alliance: SkyTeam
- Fleet size: 34
- Destinations: 24
- Parent company: Delta Air Lines and Mesa Air Group, Inc.
- Headquarters: Irving, Texas, USA
- Key people: Ryan Gumm (COO)
- Website: http://www.mesa-air.com

Freedom Airlines, Inc. was an American FAA Part 121 certificated air carrier operating under air carrier certificate number FDKA087K issued on April 1, 2002. A Nevada corporation, it was headquartered in Irving, Texas and a subsidiary of Mesa Air Group. It operated flights as Delta Connection for Delta Air Lines serving Delta's hub at Cincinnati/Northern Kentucky International Airport in Hebron, KY, near Cincinnati, OH using EMB 145 aircraft. Freedom's base moved to Cincinnati from New York City in July 2009. Freedom previously operated the CRJ-900 aircraft for Delta Connection as well; however, this contract was canceled and all aircraft were transferred to Eagan, MN-based Mesaba Airlines, Atlanta, GA-based Atlantic Southeast Airlines, and Memphis, TN-based Pinnacle Airlines.

Commuter Airlines was an unrelated airline that also used the name Freedom Airlines, operating independently during the 1980s flying scheduled passenger service with Convair 580 and Fairchild Swearingen Metroliner turboprops. This earlier version of Freedom Airlines served the eastern U.S. including destinations in Massachusetts, Michigan, Ohio, Pennsylvania, South Carolina and Virginia including Washington D.C.

== History ==
The airline was established in March 2002 and started operations in October 2002. It was the launch customer for the Bombardier CRJ-900. The airline was started so that Mesa Air Group could fulfill its contractual obligations to operate the CRJ-900 as America West Express for America West Airlines. Establishing Freedom was necessary as Mesa Airlines was also operating as US Airways Express under a code share agreement for US Airways. US Airways' collective bargaining agreement with the Air Line Pilots Association prohibited contract carrier code share arrangements with regional jet carriers, if that carrier operated aircraft with more than 70 seats. Mesa Airlines, therefore, could not operate as US Airways Express and operate the CRJ-900.

Initially Freedom operated the Bombardier CRJ-700 and CRJ-900 on behalf of America West Airlines. Once US Airways' pilot scope limitation was relaxed, Mesa transferred the operation of all of Freedom's regional jets to Mesa Airlines. Once this transfer was complete Freedom placed 1 Beech 1900D turboprop on its certificate in order to keep the certificate active. No scheduled flights occurred during this period with the Beech 1900, but it was used as a spare aircraft for Air Midwest aircraft flying out of Phoenix under an America West Express codeshare as well as a spare aircraft for Mesa Airlines' Dash-8-200 aircraft operating under a contract for America West. In October 2005, Freedom Airlines began operations as Delta Connection.

=== ERJ-145 Contract ===
On April 7, 2008, Mesa Air Group, the parent company of Freedom Airlines, entered litigation about contractual obligations with Delta Air Lines. Delta attempted to terminate the ERJ-145 contract due to supposed failures to meet completion in 3 of the last 6 months. On May 29, 2008, a federal judge blocked Delta from terminating Freedom's regional flying contract which, according to parent company Mesa Air Group would have forced it to file for bankruptcy protection by July 20 and cut 700 jobs or 14 percent of its work force. Since then, the ERJ-145 fleet has been reduced to 22 operating aircraft along with 5 spares.

=== CRJ-900 Contract ===
In August 2008, Mesa announced that Delta was terminating Freedom's contract to operate CRJ-900 aircraft. As with the ERJ-145 contract, Mesa alleged that the cancellation was driven by Delta's intention to cut capacity rather than Freedom's failure to meet operational performance standards, as Delta claims. However, unlike the ERJ-145 contract, Delta's attempt to cancel the contract was successful. The seven CRJ-900s were returned to Delta with no further financial obligation to Mesa. They were being operated by Pinnacle Airlines until they received the last of their CRJ-900s orders. After that, 5 were operated by Mesaba Airlines. The other 2 were operated by Atlanta-based Atlantic Southeast Airlines.

== Shutdown ==
In May 2010, a federal judge ruled against regional carrier Mesa Air Group in the long-running dispute with Delta Air Lines over the larger carrier's right to cancel a regional jet service contract. Mesa said in a statement that it may now have to lay off 500 workers at its Freedom Airlines subsidiary because 22 of its regional jets will be without work. On August 31, 2010, the last flight for Freedom Airlines operated.

== Fleet at time of closure ==
The Freedom Airlines fleet at the time it ceased operations consisted of the following aircraft:

| Aircraft | In fleet | Passengers |
|---|---|---|
| Embraer ERJ-145 | 34 | 50 |

=== Retired fleet ===
Freedom Airlines Retired fleet
| Aircraft | Year Retired | Replacement | Notes |
|---|---|---|---|
| de Havilland Canada Dash 8-100 | 2007 | Embraer ERJ-145 | Acquired in 2006 for Delta Connection flights at New York's John F. Kennedy International Airport (JFK.) |
| Bombardier CRJ900 | 2008 | n/a | Leased monthly from Delta for $1.00 per aircraft per month |

== See also ==
- List of defunct airlines of the United States
