= Go Airlines =

Go Airlines, Go Airline or Go Air may refer to these air transport operators:

- Go! (airline), an American Hawaii-based regional airline, 2005–2014
- Go First (formerly GoAir), an Indian Mumbai-based airline, 2005–2023
- Go Fly, a British airline, 1998–2003
- GoJet Airlines, an American Missouri-based regional airline, formed 2004

== See also ==
- IndiGo, an Indian Gurgaon-based airline, formed 2005
