= Centennial Airlines =

US regional airline

IATA	ICAO	Call sign
BE	CNL	WYO-AIR
- Founded: 1981; 44 years ago
- Ceased operations: 1987; 38 years ago
- Fleet size: 3
- Destinations: See below
- Headquarters: Laramie, Wyoming, then Worland, Wyoming, United States

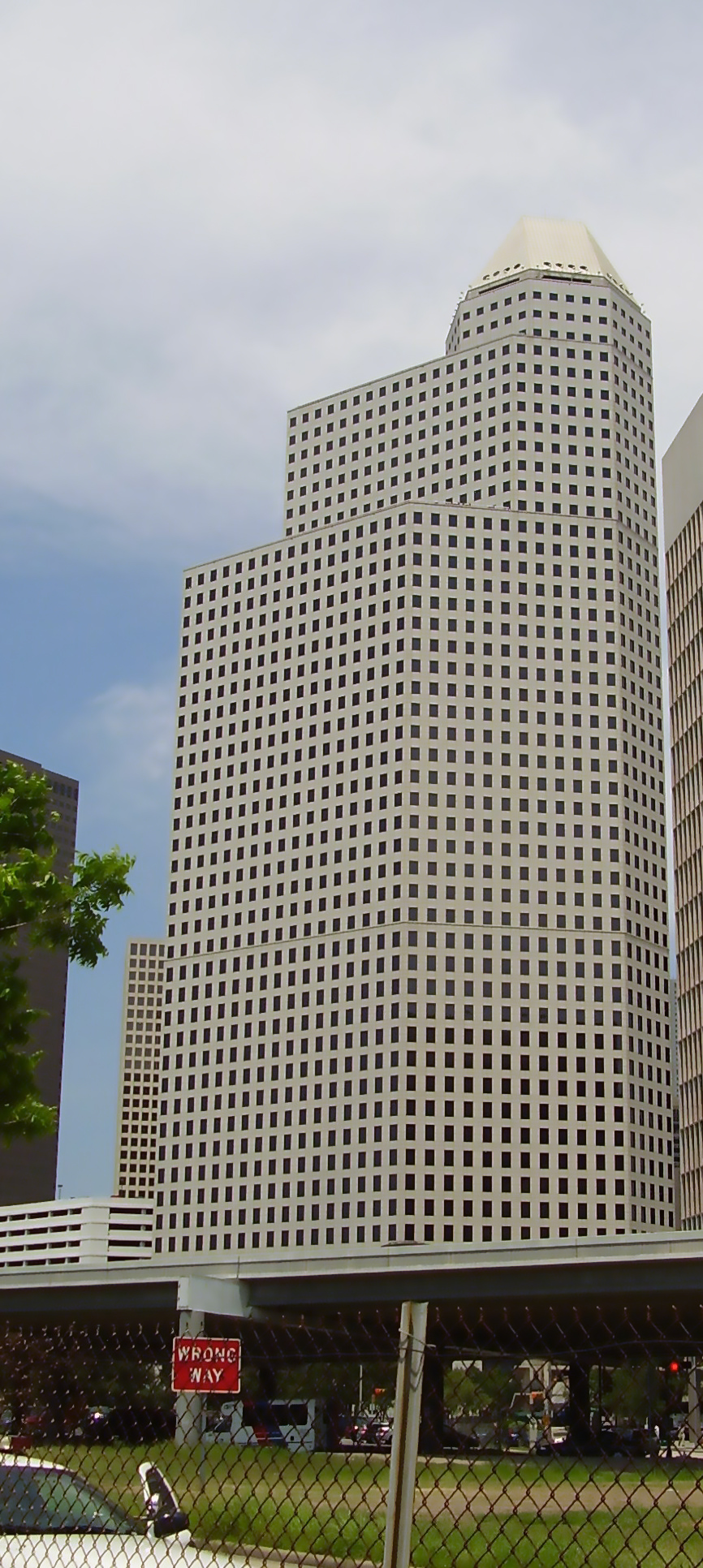
Former headquarters of Centennial Airlines

Centennial Airlines was founded in Laramie, Wyoming and began operations on June 15, 1981, with an initial route linking Denver to Laramie and Worland, Wyoming using a single Cessna 414 aircraft. The carrier flew until June 15, 1987, when it was merged into Mesa Airlines. Centennial was first based in Laramie, Wyoming, moved its offices to Worland, then to Cheyenne for a brief time in 1982, then back to Worland.

== Destinations ==
- Denver, Colorado
- Billings, Montana,
- Logan
- Salt Lake City
- Casper
- Cheyenne
- Cody
- Jackson
- Lander
- Laramie
- Rawlins
- Riverton
- Rock Springs
- Worland

Routes operated include

- Denver-Casper-Cody,
- Denver-Cheyenne-Rawlins,
- Denver-Rock Springs-Lander-Worland,
- Denver-Laramie-Riverton-Worland-Cody-Billings,
- Salt Lake City-Logan-Riverton-Worland-Cody

== See also ==
- List of defunct airlines of the United States

== Fleet ==
- 2 Beechcraft 1900s
- 1 Beechcraft 99 at the time of its merger with Mesa Airlines.
