= Mesa Airlines =

Regional airline of the United States

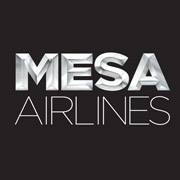

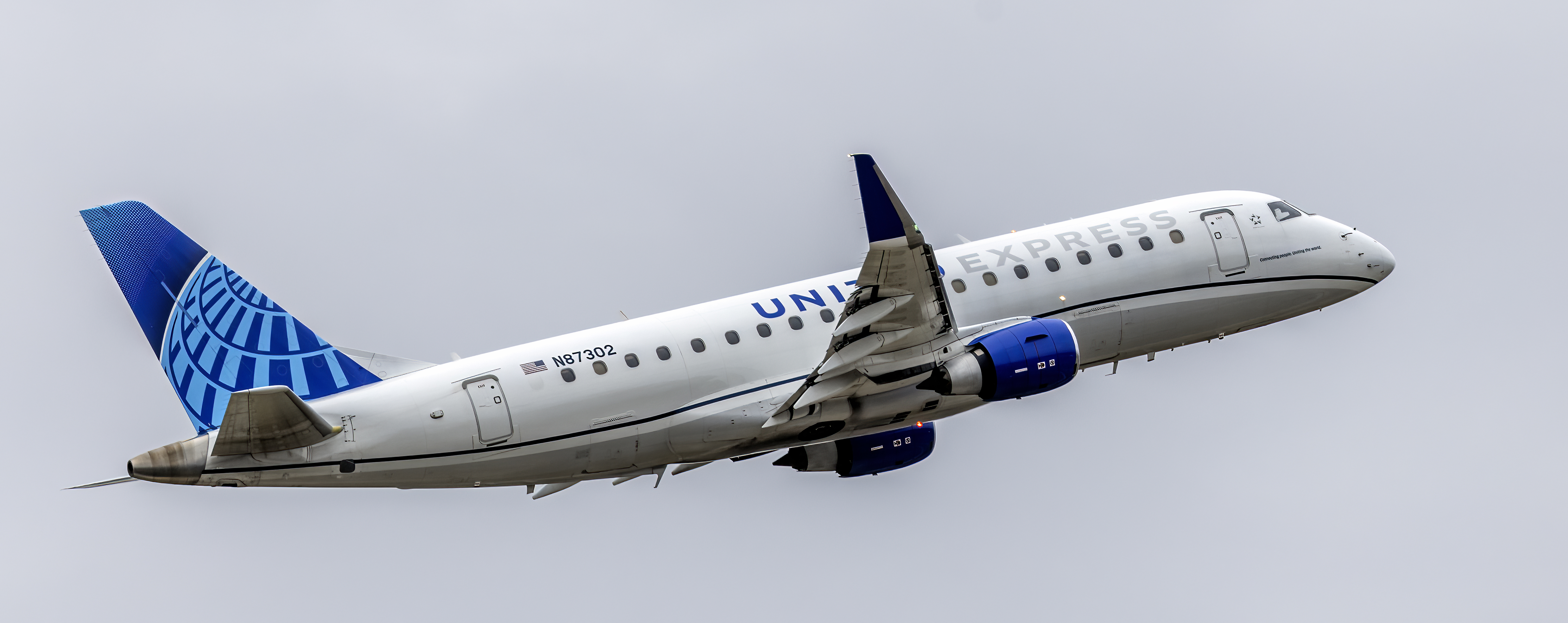
- Embraer 175 in United Express livery
IATA	ICAO	Call sign
YV	ASH	AIR SHUTTLE
- Founded: 1980; 46 years ago
- Commenced operations: October 12, 1980; 45 years ago
- AOC #: MASA036A
- Hubs: Houston–Intercontinental; Washington–Dulles
- Fleet size: 60
- Destinations: 73
- Parent company: Republic Airways Holdings
- Headquarters: Phoenix, Arizona, U.S.
- Key people: Jonathan G. Ornstein (Chairman & CEO); Michael Lotz (President & CFO)
- Employees: 1,992 (2024)
- Website: mesa-air.com

Mesa Airlines, Inc. is an American regional airline headquartered in Phoenix, Arizona, and a wholly-owned subsidiary of Republic Airways Holdings. Mesa operates and maintains a fleet of Embraer 175 aircraft that are scheduled, marketed and sold by United Airlines as United Express. Mesa operates from 73 cities in the United States, Cuba, Mexico, and Canada with a network of routes largely set up to connect passengers between smaller airports and United's Houston–Intercontinental and Washington–Dulles hubs. In 2024, the company's 1,992 employees operated an average of 279 flights per day.

== History ==
Mesa began operations as Mesa Air Shuttle in Farmington, New Mexico, in 1980. From 1989 through 1998, Mesa Airlines operated as a conglomeration of up to eight separate airlines. For the history of the acquisition and expansion of Mesa Airlines during this time see Mesa Air Group. The following history section details the history of the individual airlines that comprised Mesa Airlines during this time frame.

=== Mesa Airlines ===
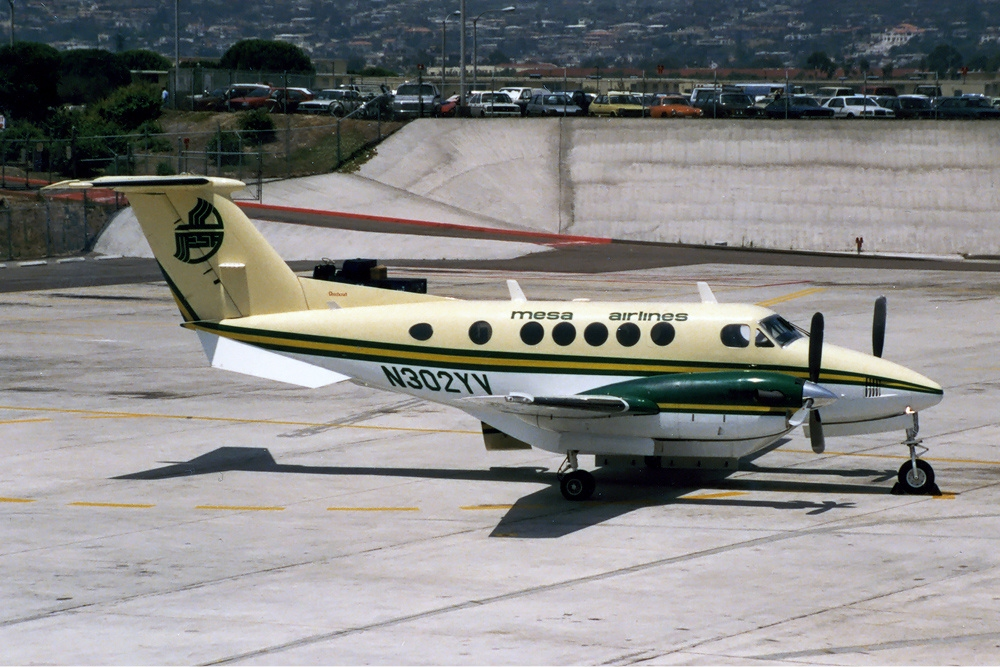
A Beechcraft King Air in the very first colors of Mesa Air Lines

The original Mesa Air Shuttle was a flight division of JB Aviation in Farmington, New Mexico, and operated a single route from Farmington to Albuquerque using a Piper Saratoga aircraft. In 1981, as the first Frontier Airlines (1950-1986) was discontinuing its flights between the two cities, Mesa obtained a twin-engine Piper Navajo Chieftain and increased service on the route. In 1982, the original owners sold the company to Larry and Janie Risley. The Risleys quickly expanded the carrier by acquiring a fleet of 14-passenger seat Beechcraft Model 99 commuter turboprops and adding service throughout New Mexico and surrounding states with a hub at Albuquerque. In 1985, larger 19-passenger seat Beechcraft 1900s were acquired which replaced the Beechcraft Model 99s and became the backbone of Mesa's fleet. By 1987, up to 47 daily departures were operating from Albuquerque to 18 cities. Also in 1987, a Denver hub was created when Mesa acquired Centennial Airlines which operated several routes from Denver into Wyoming. After an initial route from Farmington and Gallup to Phoenix began in 1985, Phoenix was expanded into a hub in 1989 with new routes throughout Arizona. In 1990, most Denver flights were incorporated into the United Express division which Mesa had acquired from Aspen Airways. In 1992, when Mesa established a codeshare with America West Airlines, its Phoenix hub was turned over to the America West Express division. A minor hub was also operated at Farmington in the late 1980s with up to 22 daily flights connecting Albuquerque, Phoenix, and Salt Lake City to Durango, Cortez, and Telluride, CO. For a brief time in 1995 and 1996, the Mesa Airlines operation at Albuquerque, the United Express operation in Denver, and the America West Express operation in Phoenix were all known as operated by Mountain West Airlines. In 1997 and 1998, routes from Little Rock to Nashville and Wichita and from Nashville to Tupelo were added, first as Mesa Airlines, then later as US Airways Express.

In 1997, Mesa established a small hub at Fort Worth Meacham International Airport, using two Bombardier CRJ200 regional jet aircraft, providing service from Fort Worth to San Antonio, Austin, and Houston Hobby, as well as new routes from Colorado Springs to Nashville and San Antonio. The venture was short-lived, and these routes were all eliminated during a corporate restructuring. The Albuquerque hub was merged into Air Midwest in 2001 but operated as a codeshare for Mesa Airlines until the hub was dissolved at the end of 2007.

In 1998, Mesa moved its headquarters from Farmington, New Mexico, to Phoenix, Arizona.

==== America West Express ====
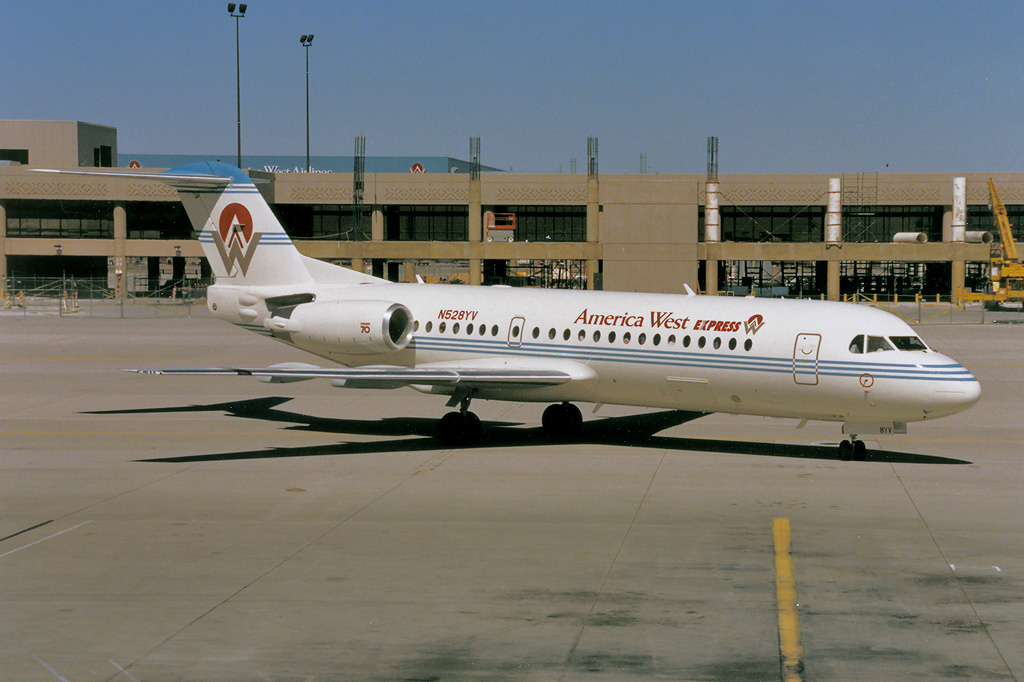
Desert Sun Airways d.b.a. Fokker 70 in America West Express colors

In September 1992, Mesa negotiated a code-sharing agreement with America West Airlines to operate as America West Express out of its Phoenix hub, serving 12 cities. These routes were originally from the independent Mesa operation and several Beechcraft 1900D aircraft were painted in the America West Airlines scheme. The codeshare allowed increased frequency and increased load factors and expansion into several new markets.

In 1995, Mesa created a new subdivision called Desert Sun Airlines and acquired a pair of Fokker 70 jets for use on new America West Express routes from Phoenix to Des Moines and Spokane. Desert Sun was merged into the Mesa Airlines division in 1997 and its Fokker 70 aircraft were replaced by Bombardier CRJ200 regional jet aircraft. The CRJ-200 aircraft also began replacing the Beechcraft 1900D and Embraer EMB-120 turboprops. The Beechcraft 1900Ds were then transitioned over to Mesa's Air Midwest subsidiary. Beginning in December 1997, Mesa began operating Dash 8-200 aircraft between Phoenix and Grand Junction followed by many other cities throughout Colorado, New Mexico, Arizona, and California. In 2003, Mesa Airlines took over the operations of Freedom Airlines and Freedom Airlines' CRJ900 regional jets were transferred into the America West Express operation. The Beechcraft 1900D flights operated by Air Midwest were discontinued on May 30, 2008.

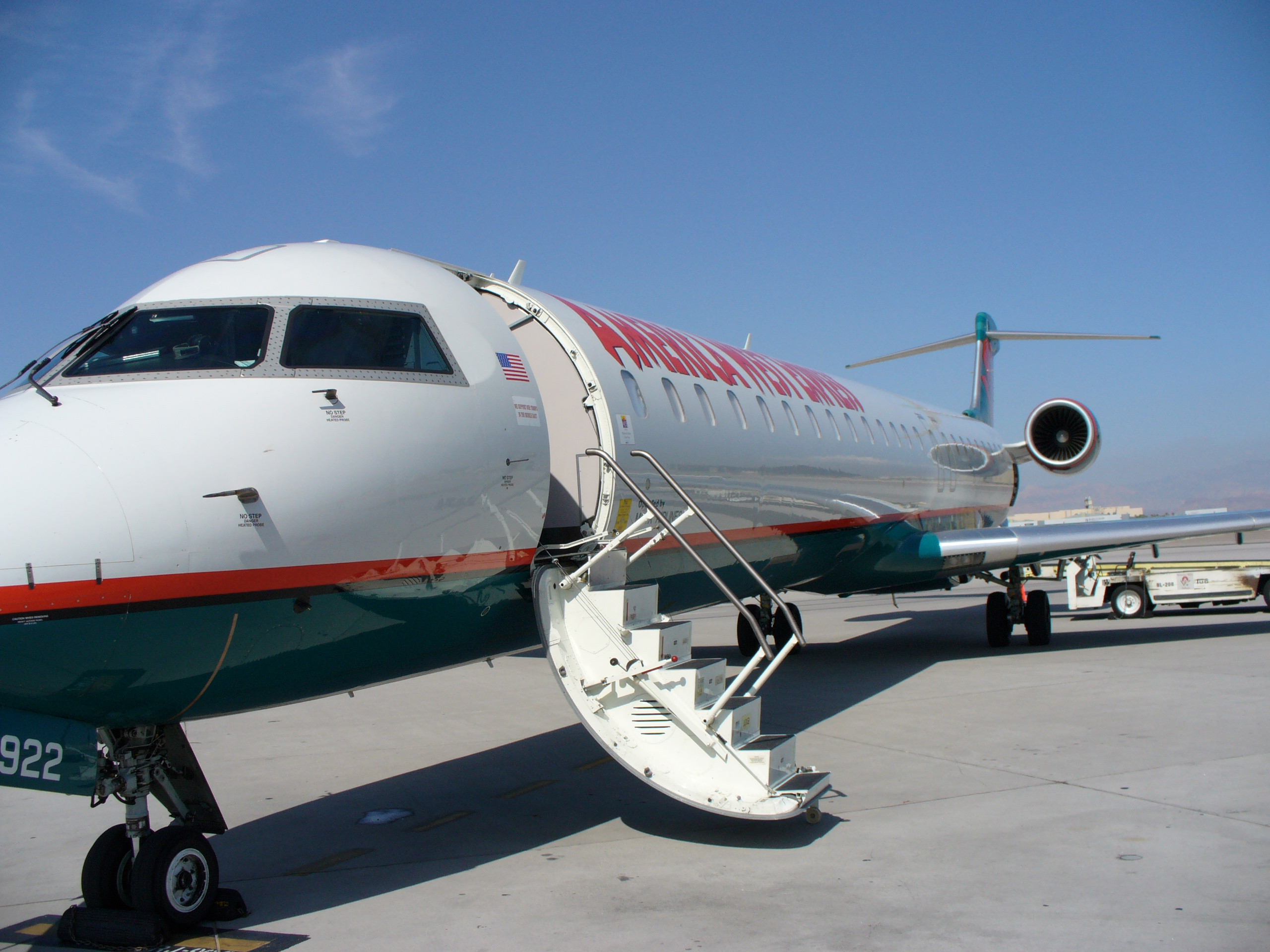
Bombardier CRJ900 in America West Express colors

On September 16, 2005, America West Airlines and US Airways completed their merger. Although the corporate side and operationally those companies merged, as of May 2008, the flight operations of the two companies have not been merged, and Mesa continues to code share with the new US Airways Group as US Airways Express under its America West Express codeshare agreement. It operated CRJ-200 and CRJ-900 aircraft from hubs in Charlotte and Phoenix, and Dash 8 aircraft from its Phoenix hub until late 2011, when during Mesa's restructuring in bankruptcy, coinciding with United's cancelation of any further CRJ200 service by Mesa, the CRJ200s and Dash 8s were removed from service. By early 2012, the only airframe Mesa uses for the "west" side of US Airways out of its Phoenix hub and the "east" side out of its Charlotte hub is with the CRJ900.

==== US Airways Express ====
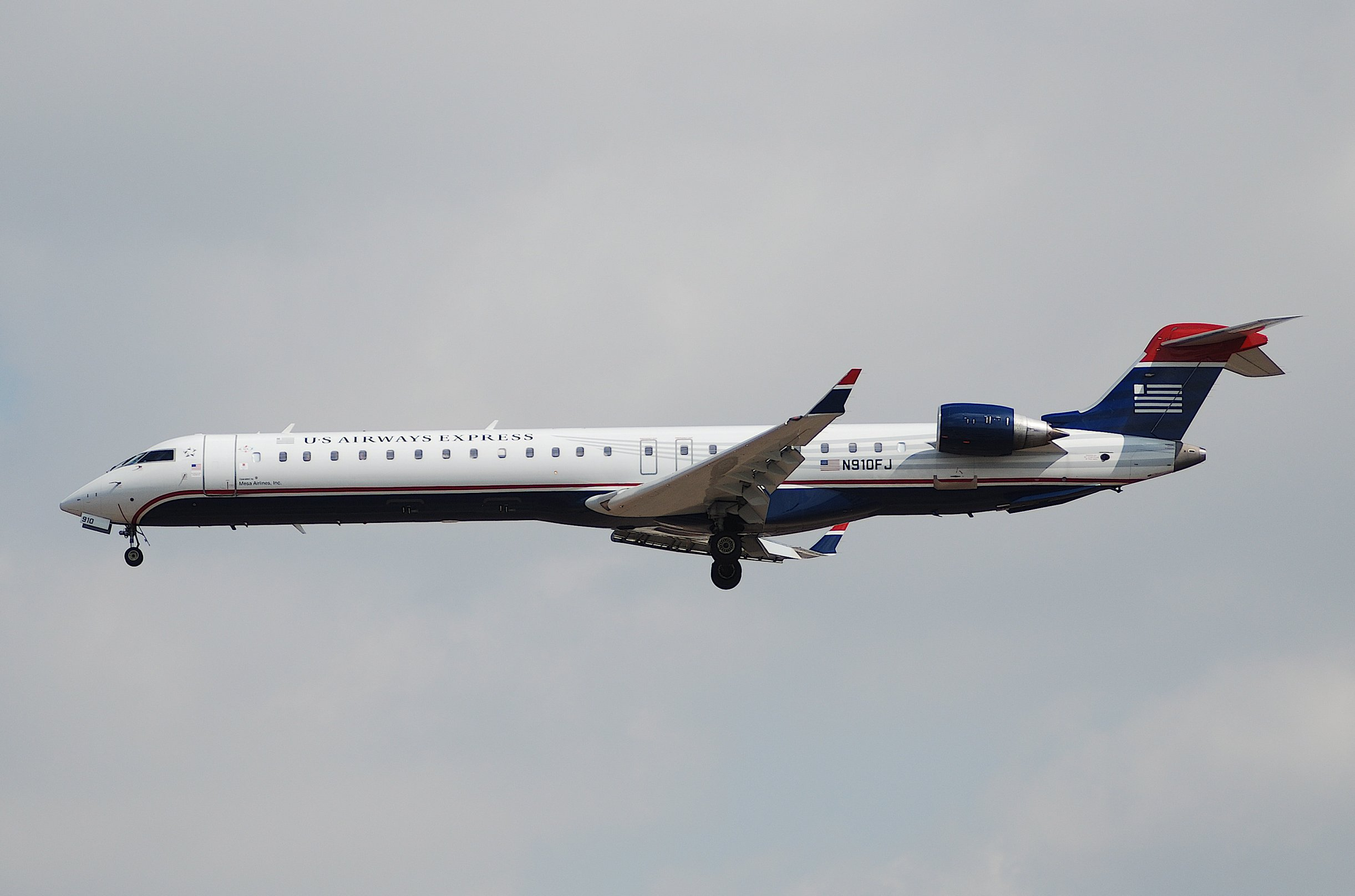
Bombardier CRJ900 in US Airways Express colors

In November 1997, Mesa negotiated a codeshare agreement to provide service to US Airways as US Airways Express for 14 regional jets to various cities from its Philadelphia and Charlotte hubs. In 1998 and 2000, the agreement was expanded to 28 jets and then to 52 jets. The first CRJ200 aircraft began operating in 1998. As Mesa began taking deliveries of the Embraer ERJ 145 aircraft in 2000, the CRJs were transferred to the America West division, separating the fleet types.

In 2003, 20 CRJ200 aircraft were reintroduced to the US Airways Express division. With the reintroduction of the CRJ, the CRJ200 aircraft operated out of the Philadelphia hub, and the ERJ 145 aircraft operated out of the Charlotte hub.

In 2005, Mesa's codeshare agreement with US Airways was not reaffirmed in bankruptcy court, and Mesa began transitioning the aircraft to other codeshares. Twenty-six ERJ aircraft were transitioned to Freedom Airlines, and the CRJ and remaining ERJs were transferred to Mesa's United Express operation. However, following the America West Airlines merger later that year, the Mesa contract for America West Express was retained and expanded to include non-former America West Express routes. All US Airways Express flying was converted to American Eagle on October 17, 2015, when the merger between American and US Airways was completed.

==== American Eagle ====
As the merger process between American Airlines and US Airways was progressing, Mesa Airlines began operating as American Eagle on November 6, 2014, with routes out of the American Airlines hubs at Dallas/Fort Worth and Los Angeles using CRJ-900 aircraft. US Airways Express routes from Charlotte and Phoenix were gradually shifted to American Eagle until the transition and merger was completed on October 17, 2015.

As of December 17, 2022, American Eagle announced that they would part ways with Mesa Airlines due to financial troubles. In December 2022, Mesa announced that American Eagle flights would cease on April 3, 2023; Mesa cited losses stemming from utilization penalties and American Airlines' refusal to compensate Mesa for pilot wage increases it had enacted.

==== United Express ====
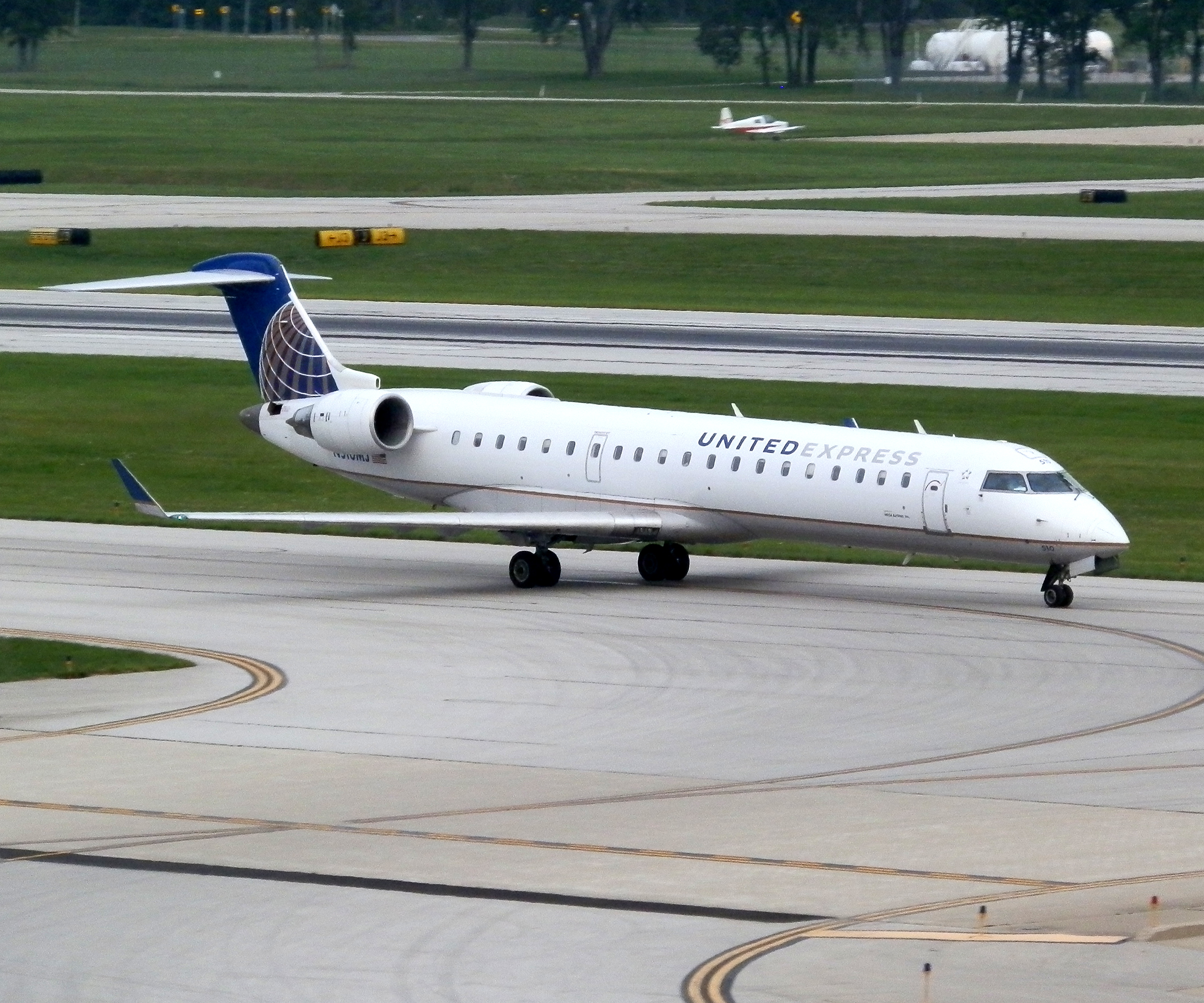
Bombardier CRJ700 in United Express colors

In 1990, Mesa acquired Aspen Airways Denver hub and routes, except for Aspen's Denver to Aspen route. It attempted to acquire Aspen's codeshare with United. However United was unwilling to codeshare with an airline that only operated 19-seat turboprops. Mesa leased Embraer EMB 120 Brasilia aircraft from its former competitor in New Mexico, Air Midwest. With the Brasilias in hand, Mesa gained a codeshare with United for its Denver hub. Several Beechcraft 1300 and Beechcraft 1900 aircraft were repainted with the United Airlines scheme.

In 1995, California Pacific and its Los Angeles hub were merged into Mesa's United Express operation. After the closing of Superior Airlines' Columbus hub, its aircraft and crews were used to expand United Express into Portland and Seattle. In 1997, operational difficulties with the Denver hub and disagreements over the renewal of Mesa's WestAir subsidiary codeshare with United resulted in the cancellation of Mesa's codeshare.

In 2003, Mesa agreed to a service agreement with United for service out of their hubs at Chicago-O'Hare, Denver, and Washington-Dulles under the United Express banner. In October 2009 United decided to exercise its early termination option for the Dash 8 flying. The Dash 8 flying ended on April 30, 2010. Around the same time, United decided not to extend its CRJ200 operation and as a result, all of the Mesa CRJ200s (26 aircraft) flying under United Express were phased out by April 30, 2010. As of 2015, Mesa's United Express operations consisted of Embraer 175s flying out of the Houston hub and CRJ700s flying out of the Washington–Dulles hub.

In December 2022, Mesa executed an agreement with United to add up to 38 Bombardier CRJ900 aircraft, dependent on the number Embraer 175 aircraft Mesa still operated, starting in March 2023. Mesa would transfer its American Eagle crew and maintenance operations in Phoenix, Dallas-Fort Worth, El Paso, and Louisville to United Express, and would open a new CRJ900 crew base in Houston and a pilot base in Denver. United agreed to compensate Mesa for the pilot wage increases it had enacted since September 2022, and agreed to buy 30 spare CRJ900 engines from Mesa for $80 million to increase Mesa's cash reserves. United received a 10% ownership stake in Mesa and a seat on the Mesa board of directors.

=== Skyway Airlines ===
The Skyway Airlines division was Mesa's first foray into the Midwest. Skyway was formed in 1989 when Mesa established a codeshare agreement with Midwest Express and a Milwaukee hub. From Milwaukee, Mesa served 25 cities in nine states in the upper Midwest region, using Beechcraft 1900 aircraft. Upon the expiration of the codeshare in 1994, it was not renewed. Midwest Express kept the Skyway Airlines name and routes, forming Astral Airways to fill the void as Mesa ceased service in Milwaukee. Mesa reallocated the aircraft and crews to start Superior Airlines in its Columbus hub for America West Express.

=== FloridaGulf Airlines ===
The FloridaGulf Airlines division was formed in 1991 after Mesa's acquisition of Air Midwest. Air Midwest's CEO, Robert Priddy, was chosen to start up the operation. It operated under a codeshare agreement with USAir and was a USAir Express carrier. It started with a Tampa hub, providing service to Florida and the southeast United States using Beechcraft 1900 aircraft. Additional hubs in Orlando, and New Orleans were established. In 1993, the airline expanded into the Northeast, with a hub in Boston and eventually Philadelphia. In 1994, six Embraer EMB 120 aircraft were added. It also had a hub and a field maintenance unit in Jacksonville, Florida. By the time it was merged into Air Midwest, in 1997, it was operating 44 Beechcraft 1900D and 9 Embraer EMB 120 aircraft serving 49 destinations.

=== Superior Airlines ===
After Midwest Express notified Mesa they would not be renewing the contract to operate their Skyway Airlines division, Mesa allocated the aircraft and crews to form Superior Airlines in 1994. Superior initially competed against their former Midwest Express partner as America West Express and also provided service from the new America West Columbus hub. Superior operated America West Express flights to compete against their former partner from Milwaukee to Flint, Lansing, Columbus, Grand Rapids, Indianapolis, Des Moines, and Cedar Rapids, as well as from Rockford to Detroit. Within 18 months Mesa redirected Superior and its Beechcraft 1900D fleet to focus exclusively on the Columbus hub. By 2000 the aircraft and crews, which consisted of CRJ200s (CL-65s), were being operated by Mesa Airlines itself. America West Airlines closed its Columbus hub in 2003 and Mesa again reallocated the assets this time to its newly reacquired United Express operation.

=== CalPac (California Pacific) ===
Mesa created CalPac (California Pacific) in 1992, establishing a second United Express carrier with a Los Angeles hub along with WestAir. It utilized Beechcraft 1900D and Embraer EMB 120 aircraft to serve 12 destinations. In 1995, the airline division was merged into Mesa's United Express operation.

=== Liberty Express Airlines ===
In 1994, Mesa acquired Pittsburgh-based Crown Airways. Using the acquired assets, Mesa established Liberty Express with its hub in Pittsburgh and a codeshare with US Airways. In 1997, it was merged into Air Midwest, operating 14 Beechcraft 1900D aircraft serving 17 destinations.

=== Desert Sun Airlines ===
The Desert Sun Airlines division was created in 1995 to inaugurate Mesa's first jet service utilizing Fokker 70 aircraft. It operated as America West Express from a Phoenix hub. The first two cities to receive jet service were Spokane and Des Moines. In 1996, the division was merged into Mesa's America West Express operation, and the Fokker 70 aircraft were replaced by Bombardier CRJ aircraft as they were introduced. There was also a previous Desert Sun Airlines not affiliated with Mesa that operated scheduled passenger commuter service in southern California during the mid-1980s with Beechcraft 99 turboprops and Piper Chieftain prop aircraft.

=== go! ===
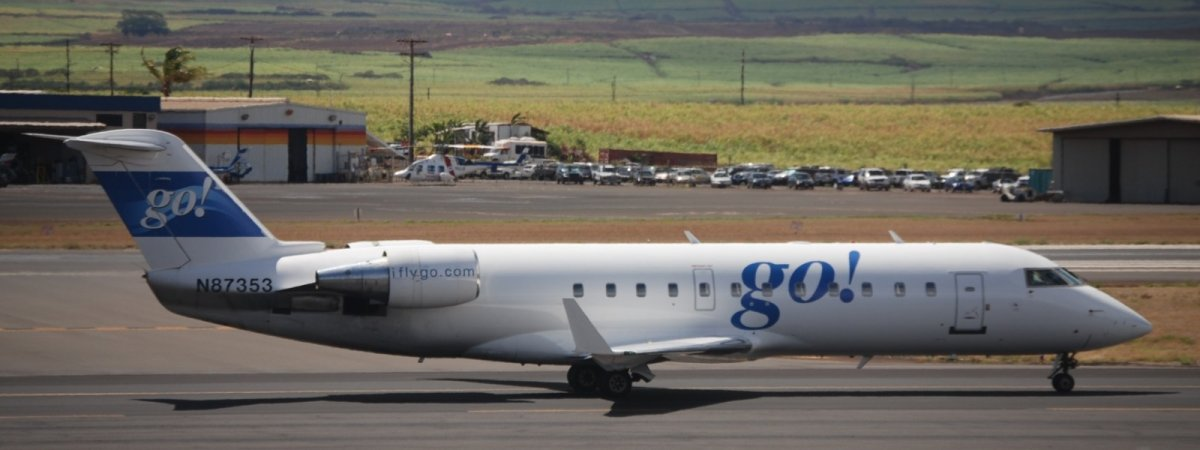
Bombardier CRJ200 in full go! livery

In 2006, Mesa formed go! in the Hawaiian Islands, using five Bombardier CRJ aircraft from its Honolulu hub. It established a code share with Mokulele Airlines, which served airports that cannot accept jet aircraft and provide point-to-point service in between the islands with Cessna Caravan turboprops. The codeshare with Mokulele was later replaced by one with Island Air, which was itself later replaced by a joint venture with Mokulele dubbed go! Mokulele. The airline ceased operations in Hawaii on April 1, 2014.

Mesa's go! was involved in multiple lawsuits with Hawaiian Airlines and Aloha Airlines and was also investigated by the Federal Aviation Administration for an incident on February 13, 2008, where both pilots fell asleep during a regularly scheduled 36-minute flight between Honolulu and Hilo. go!'s flight 1002 overshot Hilo Airport by 15 miles (24 km), remaining 21,000 feet (6,400 m) in the air as they missed the destination. Air traffic controllers were unable to reach the two pilots for 25 minutes, after which contact was re-established and the aircraft returned for a safe landing in Hilo.

Mesa's go! was also blamed for the March 31, 2008 shutdown of Aloha Airlines due to "predatory fares".

=== Kunpeng Airlines ===
Kunpeng Airlines was formed as a joint venture between Mesa Airlines and Shenzhen Airlines of China. They began flying in October 2007 with three Bombardier CRJ200 aircraft and currently have five in China . The airline originally expected to operate 20 CRJs prior to the 2008 Summer Olympics in Beijing and plan to expand at a rate of 20 aircraft per year for the next 5 years. All pilots would have been based in Beijing or Xi'an and the airline initially was to fly to 16 regional airports. Mesa intended to replace the outgoing CRJ200s with larger regional jets such as the CRJ700 and CRJ900. Kunpeng has recently decided to delay the delivery of CRJ200 in favor of brand new Embraer 190. All of the Mesa aircraft are being returned.

Furthermore, as of June 2009, Mesa no longer has a financial interest in Kunpeng Airlines, as Shenzhen Airlines purchased Mesa's interest in the original joint venture.

=== Merger with Republic Airways ===
On April 7, 2025, Republic Airways Holdings announced that it would acquire Mesa in an all-stock merger. Under the terms of the agreement, Republic shareholders will own approximately 88% of the merged company, while Mesa shareholders will retain between 6% and 12%. The merger closed November 25, 2025.

Following the merger, the combined company will operate approximately 310 Embraer 170/175 aircraft and more than 1,250 daily departures. Republic will continue operating under agreements with American Airlines, Delta Air Lines, and United Airlines, while Mesa will fly under a 10-year agreement with United.

Prior to the merger, Mesa had scaled back its operations to about 60 Embraer 175 aircraft, all of which were leased from United. The merger would leave Republic and SkyWest Airlines as the two largest remaining independent regional airlines in the United States.

== Operations ==
Mesa operates flights as United Express, a mainline airline marketing sub-brand using United Express liveried fleet of Embraer 175 aircraft under a revenue-guarantee code-sharing agreement. Its hubs are at Houston–Intercontinental and Washington–Dulles.

=== Former airline divisions & codeshares ===
- DHL Aviation, for cargo/freight operations (2020-2023)
- American Eagle (2014–2023)
- US Airways Express (2007–2014)
- America West Express (1992–2007)
- Air Midwest (1991–2008)
- CalPac (California Pacific) (1993–1995)
- Desert Sun Airlines (1995–1996)
- FloridaGulf Airlines (1991–1997)
- Go! (2005–2014)
- Liberty Express Airlines (1994–1997)
- Mountain West Airlines (1995–1996)
- Skyway Airlines (1989–1994)
- Superior Airlines (1994–1995)

=== Crew bases ===
Mesa operates three crew bases at Dulles International Airport near Washington D.C., George Bush Intercontinental Airport in Houston, and Louisville International Airport.

== Fleet ==
=== Current fleet ===
As of March 2025, the Mesa Airlines fleet consists of the following aircraft:

Aircraft	Total	Passengers				Operated for
Aircraft	Total	F	E+	E	Total	Operated for
Embraer 175	31	12	32	26	70	United Express
Embraer 175	29	12	16	48	76	United Express
Total	60					

In September 2013, Mesa Airlines announced an agreement with United Airlines which extended the operation of 20 CRJ700s through 2020. The agreement included an order of 30 United-owned Embraer 175s that was operated under contract by Mesa Airlines. Mesa Airlines later announced an agreement with United Airlines to add 18 Embraer 175 aircraft to Mesa's United Express fleet. Mesa operated 48 Embraer aircraft for United Airlines. In October 2013, the company announced an agreement for the addition of 15 new aircraft scheduled for delivery in 2016, which increased to 18. Mesa currently operates 80 Embraer 175 aircraft under the United Express brand.

On 8 January 2025, it was reported that Mesa Airlines had entered into a sale-leaseback agreement with United Airlines to purchase and then leaseback 18 units of Embraer 175 aircraft, in a deal that would raise $230 million for the regional carrier. The deal involved the transfer of eight E175s by the end of December 2024, with the remaining 10 aircraft in early 2025.

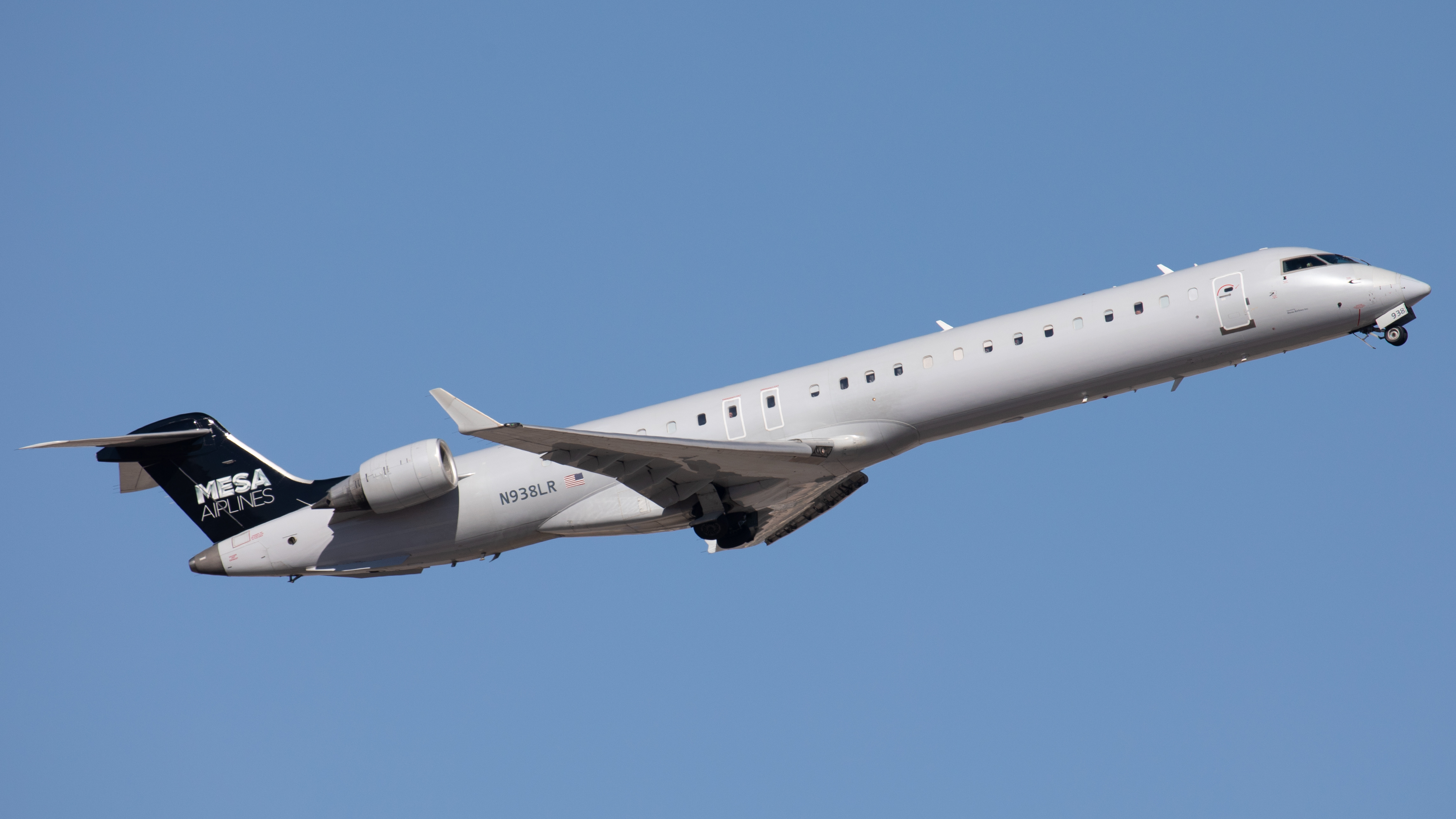
A former Mesa Airlines CRJ-900 in the airlines official livery

Mesa operated its final CRJ-900 revenue flight on February 28, 2025, concluding a phased retirement that began in late 2024. As of March 1, 2025, Mesa Airlines maintains an exclusively Embraer 175 fleet.

=== Historical fleet ===
- Bombardier CRJ-900
- CATPASS 200, a Beechcraft King Air 200 with a modified 13-passenger cabin
- Piper Chieftain – second aircraft operated from 1981 through 1983. Briefly operated from Farmington to Denver, Durango, and Grand Junction, CO and to Vernal, UT

== Destinations ==
Mesa operates for United Express in the following destinations – some routes may only be seasonal.

List of destinations
City	Country (Subdivision)	IATA	Airport	Notes
Phoenix, Arizona	United States (Arizona)	PHX	Phoenix Sky Harbor International Airport	Hub
Tucson, Arizona	United States (Arizona)	TUS	Tucson International Airport	MX Base
Palm Springs	United States (California)	PSP	Palm Springs International Airport	Seasonal
Colorado Springs	United States (Colorado)	COS	City of Colorado Springs Municipal Airport	
Hartford	United States (Connecticut)	BDL	Bradley International Airport	
Fort Walton Beach	United States (Florida)	VPS	Destin–Fort Walton Beach Airport	
Jacksonville	United States (Florida)	JAX	Jacksonville International Airport	
Pensacola	United States (Florida)	PNS	Pensacola International Airport	
Atlanta	United States (Georgia)	ATL	Hartsfield-Jackson Atlanta International Airport	
Savannah	United States (Georgia)	SAV	Savannah/Hilton Head International Airport	
Boise	United States (Idaho)	BOI	Boise Airport	
Indianapolis	United States (Indiana)	IND	Indianapolis International Airport	
Wichita	United States (Kansas)	ICT	Wichita Dwight D. Eisenhower National Airport	
Lafayette	United States (Louisiana)	LFT	Lafayette Regional Airport	
New Orleans	United States (Louisiana)	MSY	Louis Armstrong New Orleans International Airport	
Boston	United States (Massachusetts)	BOS	Logan International Airport	
Detroit	United States (Michigan)	DTW	Detroit Metropolitan Wayne County Airport	
Minneapolis/St. Paul	United States (Minnesota)	MSP	Minneapolis-Saint Paul International Airport	
Jackson	United States (Mississippi)	JAN	Jackson–Medgar Wiley Evers International Airport	
Kansas City	United States (Missouri)	MCI	Kansas City International Airport	
St. Louis	United States (Missouri)	STL	Lambert-Saint Louis International Airport	
Omaha	United States (Nebraska)	OMA	Eppley Airfield	
Reno/Lake Tahoe	United States (Nevada)	RNO	Reno/Tahoe International Airport	
Albuquerque	United States (New Mexico)	ABQ	Albuquerque International Sunport	
Albany	United States (New York)	ALB	Albany International Airport	
Buffalo	United States (New York)	BUF	Buffalo Niagara International Airport	
New York City	United States (New York)	LGA	LaGuardia Airport	
Rochester	United States (New York)	ROC	Greater Rochester International Airport	
Syracuse	United States (New York)	SYR	Syracuse Hancock International Airport	
Greensboro	United States (North Carolina)	GSO	Piedmont Triad International Airport	
Raleigh/Durham	United States (North Carolina)	RDU	Raleigh-Durham International Airport	
Akron/Canton	United States (Ohio)	CAK	Akron-Canton Regional Airport	
Cincinnati, Ohio area	United States (Kentucky)	CVG	Cincinnati/Northern Kentucky International Airport	Hub
Louisville, Kentucky	United States (Kentucky)	SDF	Louisville International Airport	Hub
Columbus	United States (Ohio)	CMH	John Glenn Columbus International Airport	
Dayton	United States (Ohio)	DAY	Dayton International Airport	
Oklahoma City	United States (Oklahoma)	OKC	Will Rogers World Airport	
Tulsa	United States (Oklahoma)	TUL	Tulsa International Airport	
Harrisburg	United States (Pennsylvania)	MDT	Harrisburg International Airport	
Philadelphia	United States (Pennsylvania)	PHL	Philadelphia International Airport	
Pittsburgh	United States (Pennsylvania)	PIT	Pittsburgh International Airport	
Providence	United States (Rhode Island)	PVD	T. F. Green Airport	
Charleston	United States (South Carolina)	CHS	Charleston International Airport	
Greenville/Spartanburg	United States (South Carolina)	GSP	Greenville-Spartanburg International Airport	
Hilton Head	United States (South Carolina)	HHH	Hilton Head Airport	Seasonal
Knoxville	United States (Tennessee)	TYS	McGhee Tyson Airport	
Memphis	United States (Tennessee)	MEM	Memphis International Airport	
Nashville	United States (Tennessee)	BNA	Nashville International Airport	
Austin	United States (Texas)	AUS	Austin-Bergstrom International Airport	
Brownsville	United States (Texas)	BRO	Brownsville/South Padre Island International Airport	
Corpus Christi	United States (Texas)	CRP	Corpus Christi International Airport	
Dallas/Fort Worth	United States (Texas)	DFW	Dallas/Fort Worth International Airport	Hub
El Paso, Texas	United States (Texas)	ELP	El Paso International Airport	MX Base
Harlingen	United States (Texas)	HRL	Valley International Airport	
Houston	United States (Texas)	IAH	George Bush Intercontinental Airport	Hub
McAllen	United States (Texas)	MFE	McAllen-Miller International Airport	
Midland	United States (Texas)	MAF	Midland International Airport	
San Antonio	United States (Texas)	SAT	San Antonio International Airport	
Salt Lake City	United States (Utah)	SLC	Salt Lake City International Airport	
Burlington	United States (Vermont)	BTV	Burlington International Airport	
Norfolk	United States (Virginia)	ORF	Norfolk International Airport	
Richmond	United States (Virginia)	RIC	Richmond International Airport	
Washington, D.C. area	United States (Virginia)	IAD	Washington Dulles International Airport	Hub
Milwaukee	United States (Wisconsin)	MKE	Milwaukee Mitchell International Airport	
Wyoming	United States (Wyoming)	CPR	Casper–Natrona County International Airport	
Nassau	The Bahamas	NAS	Lynden Pindling International Airport	Seasonal
Ottawa	Canada (Ontario)	YOW	Ottawa Macdonald–Cartier International Airport	
Toronto	Canada (Ontario)	YYZ	Toronto Pearson International Airport	
Montréal	Canada (Quebec)	YUL	Montréal-Pierre Elliott Trudeau International Airport	
Havana	Cuba	HAV	José Martí International Airport	
Monterrey	Mexico (Nuevo León)	MTY	Monterrey International Airport	
San Luis Potosí	Mexico (San Luis Potosí)	SLP	Ponciano Arriaga International Airport	
Guanajuato	Mexico (Guanajuato)	SLP	Guanajuato International Airport	
Querétaro	Mexico (Querétaro)	QRO	Querétaro Intercontinental Airport	
Zihuatanejo	Mexico (Guerrero)	ZIH	Ixtapa-Zihuatanejo International Airport	
Acapulco	Mexico (Guerrero)	ACA	Acapulco International Airport	Seasonal
Manzanillo	Mexico (Colima)	ZLO	Playa de Oro International Airport	Seasonal
Guadalajara	Mexico (Jalisco)	GDL	Guadalajara International Airport	
Los Cabos	Mexico (Baja California Sur)	SJD	Los Cabos International Airport	Seasonal

=== Past destinations ===
Mesa's destinations as an independent carrier in the southwest (1980–2007) included the following:

- Albuquerque hub
  - Alamogordo, NM
  - Angel Fire, NM
  - Carlsbad, NM
  - Clovis, NM
  - Colorado Springs, CO
  - Durango, CO
  - Farmington, NM
  - Gallup, NM
  - Hobbs, NM
  - Las Cruces, NM
  - Los Alamos, NM
  - Pueblo, CO
  - Roswell, NM
  - Ruidoso, NM
  - Santa Fe, NM
  - Silver City, NM
  - Taos, NM
  - Telluride, CO
- Farmington, NM hub
  - Albuquerque, NM
  - Cortez, CO
  - Denver, CO
  - Durango, CO
  - Gallup, NM
  - Grand Junction, CO
  - Phoenix, AZ
  - Pueblo, CO
  - Salt Lake City, UT
  - Telluride, CO
  - Vernal, UT
- Dallas/Fort Worth, TX
  - Roswell, NM
- El Paso, TX
  - Alamogordo, NM
  - Ruidoso, NM
  - Tucson, AZ
- Lubbock, TX
  - Hobbs, NM
  - Roswell, NM
- Midland/Odessa, TX
  - Carlsbad, NM
  - Hobbs, NM
  - Roswell, NM

== Controversies ==
=== Flight attendants ===
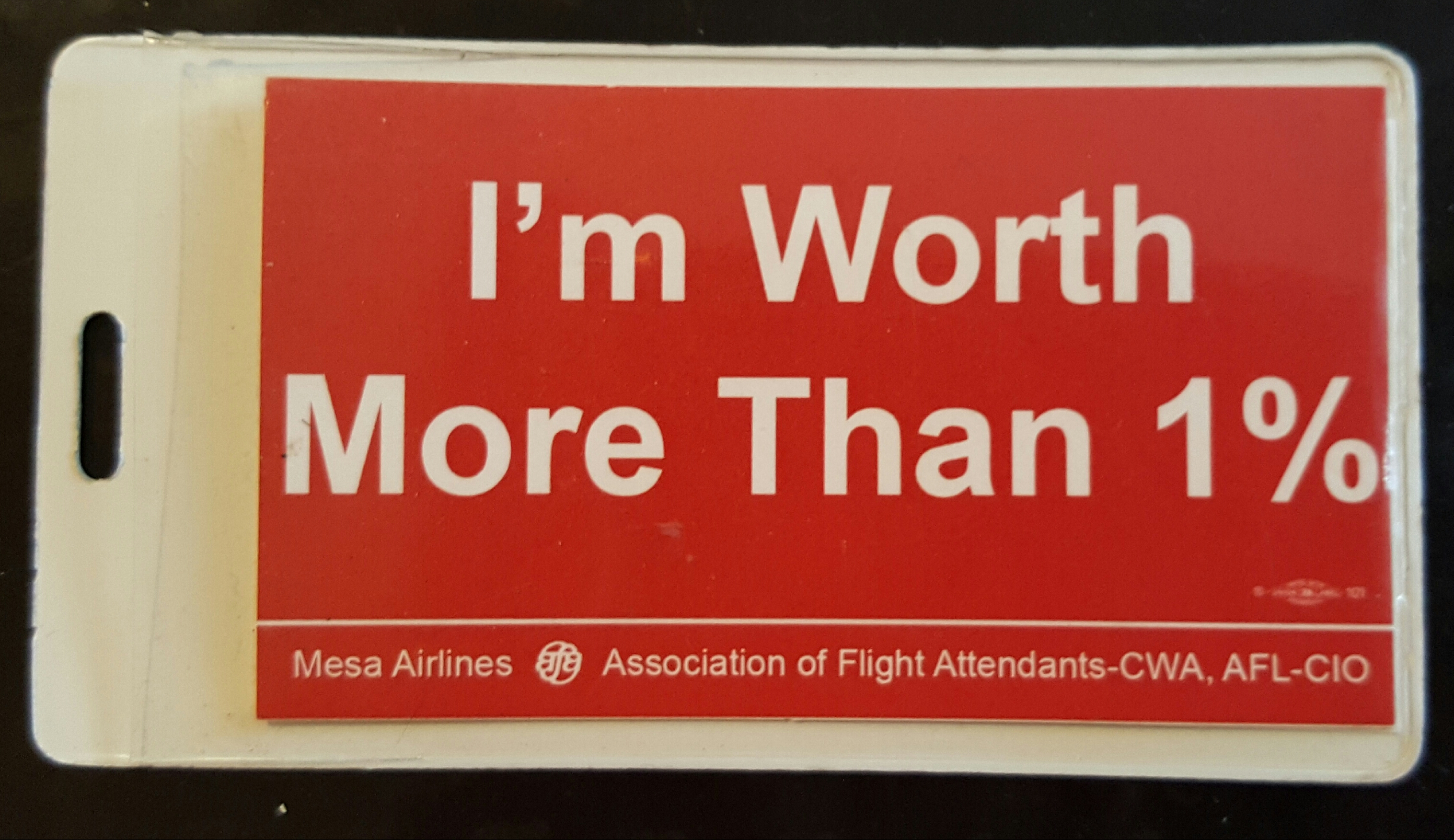
Bag tags handed to flight attendants in 2016

In February 2012 the contract between flight attendants and Mesa Airlines expired and became eligible for negotiation between the Association of Flight Attendants (AFA) and Mesa.

Flight attendants have been at the core of Mesa's operations since its agreements were reached with US Airways and their United Express operation were reached and for years before. Throughout the years many of them became frustrated with stagnant wages and non-competitive retention offerings leading to its current contract negotiations which began in 2012.

==== After bankruptcy ====
Negotiations had stalled several times in the years following 2012 in mediation and talks directly with the company after the company had only offered negligible pay increases, unaffordable health insurance, and significantly fewer incentives for flight attendants with longevity compared to other regional airlines.

In January 2017, contract negotiations in front of the National Mediation Board again came to a halt. The Association of Flight Attendants (AFA), after over five years of failed negotiations, announced that the members of the union would be coming together for a strike vote in order to either accelerate negotiations or begin using the AFA's patented method of striking – CHAOS – in order to interrupt operations with both American Airlines and United Airlines in anticipation that the two legacy carriers will place pressure on Mesa to offer livable wages and individual benefits comparable to other airlines.

On March 29, 2017, the AFA released a statement saying that Mesa Airlines Flight Attendants voted "Yes" to a strike vote overwhelmingly by a vote of 99.56%, the highest "yes" vote in at least 20 years for the AFA, and potentially in the history of the union since its founding in 1945.

In response Mesa Airlines CEO Jonathan Ornstein stated "We're going to continue to negotiate on good faith and come to an agreement that the company can afford" and that it "takes reasonableness on both parties."

Heather Stevenson, union president for Mesa, said "We're out of options" as well as "Five years of 'Please' and 'Thank you' and 'Could you do better?' hasn't done anything." She also stated "...management can choose a different outcome by seriously negotiating a contract. Mesa Airlines is an important partner in the highly-profitable American Airlines and United Airlines networks."

"Mesa Flight Attendants will not accept poverty wages", said Sara Nelson, international president of the AFA-CWA. "Enough is enough. Mesa Flight Attendants have the full backing of the 50,000 members of the Association of Flight Attendants-CWA. We are ready to do whatever it takes to achieve a fair contract."

Mesa Airlines and the AFA returned to the bargaining table during the week of April 3, 2017. While the strike vote had the intended effect, the company still offered a negligible pay increase that would keep flight attendants to what they have calculated as "Industry Average". However that number was only if both parties ignore all other regional competitors financial compensation that handle the same volume as Mesa.

On April 25, 2017, members of the AFA who were not employees of Mesa carried out informational protests in Chicago, Dallas, and Phoenix to educate the public about the union's concerns such as low wages, poor health insurance, lack of progress on contract negotiations, as well as other actions of the company, and gain attention from American and United.

The AFA and Mesa Airlines met again during June 13–15 and again did not reach a resolution. The union stated "it soon became apparent the Company was not prepared to reach a deal and saw no point in bargaining until after they knew the outcome of the pilots' vote which will be counted on July 12."

The AFA and Mesa Airlines reached a tentative agreement on August 14 and included these changes:

- Wage scale exceeding the average for flight attendants doing regional flights for United and American.
- Increased per diem.
- Block or better.
- Line guarantee and increased minimum guarantee.
- Long layover credit.
- 200% junior assignment pay.
- PBS on trial basis, strong language.
- Increased vacation for longevity.
- Improved commuter clause.
- "Me too" with pilot 401k.
- Increased deadhead pay.
- Jetbridge trades.
- Paid KCM.
- Four year duration with continued wage increases beyond the amendable date.

=== Pilots ===
On March 2, 2017, the Air Line Pilots Association, International union representing all of Mesa Airlines pilots filed a lawsuit after wages had stagnated and ceased to increase in any amount for almost ten years and the company had allegedly bypassed the Railway Labor Act by implementing bonus and incentive programs without reaching an agreement beforehand with the ALPA.

The goal of the pilots is similar to the at-the-time objective of the flight attendants, which is to be paid a standard and comparable wage to other regional airlines that can substantiate necessities such as food and shelter.

== Incidents ==
On June 29, 1990, Flight 22, a Cessna 208 Caravan en route from El Paso, Texas, to Ruidoso, New Mexico, lost engine power and landed on New Mexico State Road 220 about four miles short of the Sierra Blanca Regional Airport. There were no injuries and the only visible damage was to the sheet metal on the right wingtip.

On February 13, 2008, the pilots of a go! Bombardier CRJ200 fell asleep and overshot their destination airport by 26 nautical miles (48 km; 30 mi) before air traffic control was able to make contact with the aircraft. The incident happened on the third consecutive day during which the pilots had been required to start duty at 05:40 am. The captain suffered from an undiagnosed severe sleep apnea. The National Transportation Safety Board determined the probable cause of this incident as follows: "The captain and first officer inadvertently falling asleep during the cruise phase of flight. Contributing to the incident were the captain's undiagnosed obstructive sleep apnea and the flight crew's recent work schedules, which included several consecutive days of early-morning start times."

On September 29, 2015, American Airlines Flight 5786, which was operated by Mesa Airlines under the American Eagle brand, encountered a wing strike during landing on a day with calm winds. The plane landed and taxied to the gate without further incident. No injuries were reported.

On January 11, 2019, American Eagle Flight 5766, en route from Dallas-Fort Worth, slid off the runway after landing in icy and snowy conditions. The Bombardier CRJ900 was the first flight to attempt to land at Columbia Municipal Airport after the ground crew cleared the runway of ice and snow. Reports state the runway was still very slick with ice.

== See also ==
- Air transportation in the United States
- List of defunct airlines of the United States
