= Jonathan Ornstein =

Businessman from the United States

Jonathan G. Ornstein (born June 2, 1957) is chairman and chief executive officer of Mesa Air Group, Inc., and was appointed on May 1, 1998. From April 1996 to his joining the company as chief executive officer, Ornstein was president and chief executive officer and chairman of Virgin Express, a European airline. From 1995 to April 1996, Ornstein was chief executive officer of Virgin Express Holdings Inc.

Ornstein joined Continental Express as president and chief executive officer in July 1994 and, in November 1994, was named senior vice president, Airport Services at Continental Airlines. Ornstein was previously employed by the company from 1988 to 1994, as executive vice president and as president of the company's WestAir Holding subsidiary.

== Controversies ==
In 1978, Ornstein dropped out of the University of Pennsylvania after his junior year and relocated to the Los Angeles area when he was 21 years old. He became a broker for the firm E.F. Hutton.

Ornstein signed a consent order in June 1993 agreeing to a $20,000 fine and a three-year ban from the American Stock Exchange for making unauthorized transactions in customer accounts as a broker for Prudential-Bache Securities, according to NASD records. Earlier the same year, he was fined $10,000 and suspended for two years from associating with NASD members in connection with similar allegations, according to the association's records.
