= America West Express =

Regional airline of the United States (1985–2007)

IATA	ICAO	Call sign
YV; RP	ASH; CHQ	AIR SHUTTLE; CHATAUQUA
- Founded: 1992
- Commenced operations: 1992
- Ceased operations: September 25, 2007 (merged into US Airways Express)
- Hubs: Phoenix–Sky Harbor
- Secondary hubs: Columbus–Glenn (1993–2003); Las Vegas
- Frequent-flyer program: FlightFund
- Parent company: America West Holdings
- Headquarters: Tempe, Arizona, United States
- Key people: Doug Parker (CEO); Derek Kerr (CFO)

America West Express was the brand name for America West Airlines' commuter and regional flights operated by Chautauqua Airlines and Mesa Airlines under a code-sharing agreement.

Mesa Airlines operated America West Express from hubs at Sky Harbor International Airport in Phoenix, Arizona, and Harry Reid International Airport in Las Vegas, Nevada, to regional destinations. Chautauqua Airlines also operated America West Express regional jet service via a code-sharing agreement in support of the America West hub in Columbus, Ohio.

The fleet of America West Express consisted of 61 turboprop and regional jet aircraft.

== History ==
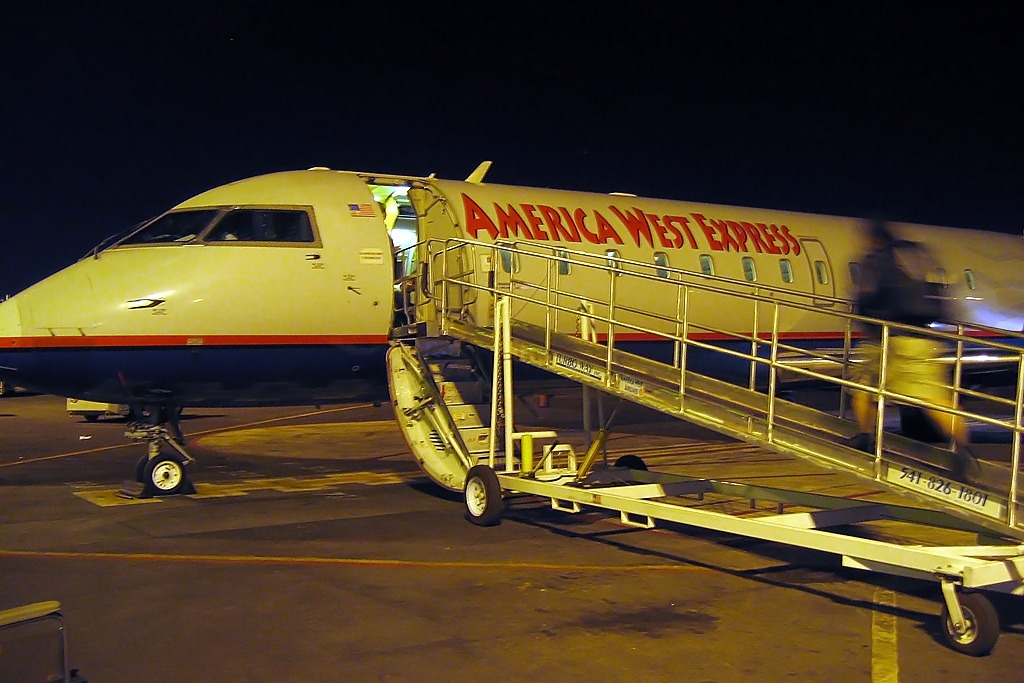
A traveler boards an America West Express CRJ200 regional jet operated by Mesa Airlines at the Las Vegas airport.

America West Express started as a regional carrier in association with America West Airlines with a hub at Sky Harbor International Airport in Phoenix, Arizona. The name "America West Express" was taken from the old America West Airlines cargo service which had begun in 1985. America West initially operated de Havilland Canada Dash 8 turboprop aircraft with its own flight crews; however, on November 30, 1992, America West signed a codeshare agreement with Mesa Airlines to operate America West Airlines' regional and commuter services as America West Express.

In the mid-1990s, with the opening of the America West Airlines hub at Port Columbus International Airport in Columbus, Ohio, America West Airlines used Mesa Airlines first with CRJ200s for 8 years with a crew base of pilots and flight attendants and then both Chautauqua Airlines to provide Embraer ERJ 145 regional jet service to feed the hub. When the Columbus hub was shut down, the Chautauqua Airlines code share was discontinued, leaving Mesa as the sole operator of AW Express services.

In 2003, America West greatly increased the size of its express operation by starting new routes operated by regional jets from its hub at McCarran International Airport in Las Vegas, Nevada.

In 2007, America West Express was branded as US Airways Express following the merger of America West with US Airways.

== Operators and fleet ==
=== Fleet ===
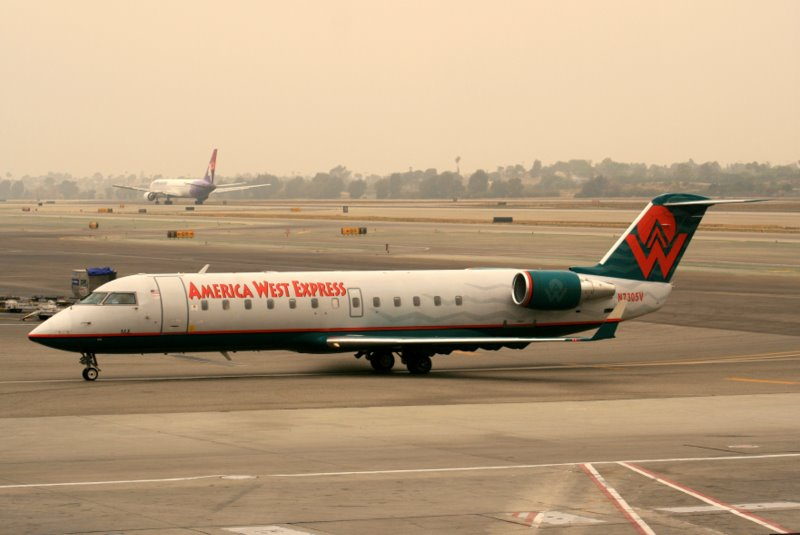
America West Express CRJ200 on a murky Los Angeles morning

America West Express fleet
Type	Aircraft	Seats
Bombardier CRJ200	18	50
Bombardier CRJ900	37	90
de Havilland Canada Dash 8-100	6	37
Embraer ERJ 145	9	50

=== Historical regional jet fleet ===
The America West Express brand, through its various regional and commuter airline partners, operated a variety of twinjet aircraft over the years including the following types:

- Fokker 70

=== Historical turboprop fleet ===
The America West Express brand, through its various regional and commuter airline partners, operated a variety of twin turboprop aircraft over the years including the following types:

- Beechcraft 1900D
- Bombardier Q200
- Embraer EMB 120

== Services ==
America West Express operated all of its fleet in a single coach class configuration. However, the CRJ-700s and CRJ-900s did offer dual class service at one point with separate first and coach class cabins. This dual class service was then subsequently dropped when it was determined that customers were not willing to pay extra for limited first class amenities on these short flights. Increasing the number of coach seats thus resulted in increased revenue.

== Identifying codes ==
Since these were code share flights, the America West Airlines codes were used for customer purposes. HPX indicates America West Express flights. However, the flights were actually operated under the Mesa Airlines and Chatauqua Airlines codes, depending on the operating airline.
