= Santa Fe Regional Airport =

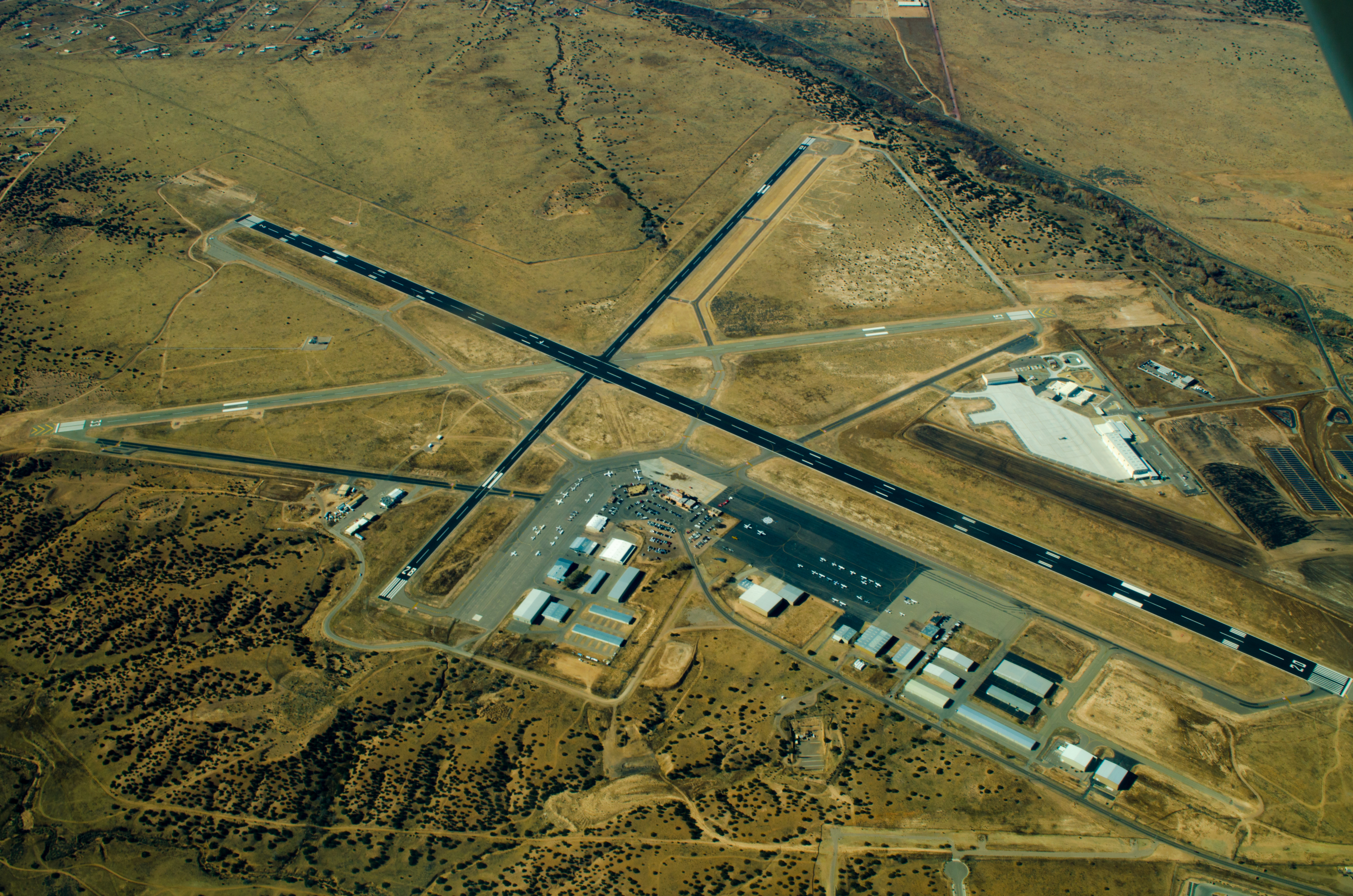
- Aerial view looking towards the southwest
- IATA: SAF; ICAO: KSAF; FAA LID: SAF

Summary
- Airport type: Public
- Owner: City of Santa Fe
- Serves: Santa Fe, New Mexico
- Elevation AMSL: 7,199 ft (2,194 m)
- Coordinates: 35°37′02″N 106°05′22″W
- Website: flysantafe.com

Maps
- FAA airport diagram
- Interactive map of Santa Fe Regional Airport

Runways
Direction	Length		Surface
Direction	ft	m	Surface
02/20	8,366	2,550	Asphalt
15/33	6,316	1,925	Asphalt
10/28	6,301	1,921	Asphalt

Statistics (2024)
- Aircraft operations: 51,035
- Total Passengers: 360,000
- Source: Federal Aviation Administration

Santa Fe Regional Airport (IATA: SAF, ICAO: KSAF, FAA LID: SAF) is a public use airport in Santa Fe, Santa Fe County, New Mexico, United States, 10 miles (16 km) southwest of the city center. The airport serves the greater Santa Fe and Los Alamos areas.

Santa Fe's is the second busiest commercial airport in New Mexico behind the Albuquerque International Sunport. It is one of the highest in elevation in the United States at 6348 feet above sea level. The airport is currently served by American Eagle with regional jet flights to Dallas/Fort Worth, Phoenix as well as to American’s hubs at Los Angeles International Airport and Chicago’s O’Hare International Airport. It is also served by United Express with regional jets to Denver and Houston. The airport also sees a considerable amount of private jet activity by NetJets and many other companies. There are two fixed base operators: Jet Center at Santa Fe which has a facility just northeast of the terminal and Signature Flight Support SAF in the old terminal building just south of the current terminal.

Since the introduction of regional jet service by major airlines in 2009, the airport has seen a tremendous increase in airline activity with 43,329 passenger boardings (enplanements) in calendar year 2011 to 142,057 in 2019. The National Plan of Integrated Airport Systems for 2011–2015 called it a general aviation airport based on enplanements in 2008, when Santa Fe had no airline service while airport officials awaited federal approval of an environmental impact assessment (the commercial service category requires at least 2,500 per year). However, as of the 2019-2023 NPIAS, it is listed as a commercial service - primary nonhub airport.

== History ==
The airport first opened in 1941 as a military airfield as the United States entered into World War II. After the war, the airport was sold to the city and all commercial activity was moved from the former Santa Fe Municipal Airport/Boyd Field, which was located off Cerrillos Road between Rodeo Road and Jaguar Drive. The new airport was called the Santa Fe County Municipal Airport until 2018, when the name was changed to Santa Fe Regional Airport. The current terminal building was opened in 1957 and has 11,000 square feet of space. It was renovated in 1988 and again in 2004 and has seen a major expansion starting in 2022. In June 1972, Frontier and Texas International Airlines, the two local service air carriers serving Santa Fe, abruptly ended service, citing unsafe runway conditions after multiple aircraft received prop damage from deteriorating asphalt. Neither carrier ever returned, and the airport then began receiving service by commuter airlines operating much smaller aircraft. In 1983, Santa Fe saw its first code share service by a commuter airline on behalf of a major airline. Smaller 19-seat aircraft were mostly used, with the exception of a brief period in 1997 and 1998, when Santa Fe saw two carriers using 32-seat aircraft.

The airport lost all airline service at the end of 2007 but resumed service in the summer of 2009, when it gained its first major airline code share flights using regional jets. Passenger traffic responded tremendously to the new jet service, and regional jet flights increased from once per day in 2009 to as many as twelve per day in 2019.

To help with the increase in passenger traffic, the terminal was remodeled in 2016 by removing much of the restaurant for added gate space. The airport manager's office was converted to a baggage claim room, while the manager was relocated to a portable building. Aircraft had been parked parallel to the terminal building, accommodating a maximum of two regional jets, but were changed to park head in so that three aircraft could be accommodated. On September 27, 2017, the Santa Fe City Council approved an expansion plan for the airport to better accommodate the current volume of airline service as well as future growth. This includes expanding the terminal with added gate space, a new addition for the baggage claim area and rental cars, and a new parking lot with 750 spaces. Coinciding with the approval of this expansion plan was a renaming of the airport from Santa Fe Municipal Airport to Santa Fe Regional Airport. Funding and planning for the expansion began in 2019. A design was completed by Molzen Corbin in 2021, and the only bid received was by Bradbury Stamm Construction. Work began on February 25, 2022 and was expected to take 12–14 months. The expansion incurred several major delays but was completed in April, 2024, 26 months after work began. The expansion included a 7500 ft addition to the north side of the terminal as well as remodeling of the entire terminal. The parking area was completely rebuilt with the addition of three new long-term lots. The roadway alignment in front of the terminal was redesigned and opened in July, 2024. A second phase of terminal expansion is planned for a 13000 ft addition to the south side of the terminal which will include a new departure gate area and a restaurant. The recently completed addition currently housing a new gate area will be converted to baggage claim. Until then, baggage claim is in a portable building. An extension of Jaguar Road from NM 599 (the Santa Fe Bypass) exit #2 directly to the terminal is also planned for the future.

=== Historical airline service ===
Santa Fe's first commercial airline service was by Mid Continent Air Express beginning in 1929 operating on a route from El Paso to Denver with stops at Albuquerque, New Mexico, Santa Fe and Las Vegas, New Mexico as well as Pueblo and Colorado Springs, Colorado. The route was replaced with Western Air Express in 1931 and again by Varney Speed Lines, the predecessor of Continental Airlines, in 1934. The southwest division of Varney was operating daily round trip air service flown with a single engine Lockheed Vega aircraft on a routing of El Paso - Albuquerque - Santa Fe - Las Vegas, NM - Pueblo, CO with continuing service operated by Wyoming Air Service on to Colorado Springs, Denver, and Cheyenne, WY. In 1936, the southwest operating division of Varney was acquired by Robert F. Six who in 1937 renamed the air carrier Continental Air Lines which then began operating Lockheed Model 12 Electra Junior twin prop aircraft on a daily round trip routing of El Paso - Albuquerque - Santa Fe - Las Vegas, NM - Pueblo, CO - Colorado Springs - Denver. Mr. Six would serve as CEO of the airline until 1981. Thus, Santa Fe was one of the first destinations served by Continental which would become a major domestic and international airline. In 1940, Continental began operating Lockheed Model 18 Lodestar twin prop aircraft and extended single plane service from Santa Fe and Albuquerque to Roswell and Hobbs, New Mexico as well as Midland/Odessa, Big Spring, San Angelo, and San Antonio, Texas. By the mid-1940s, Continental introduced Douglas DC-3 service, followed soon with Convair 240 and Convair 340 aircraft. In 1950, Continental expanded its service by adding more stops along the El Paso to Denver route, including Las Cruces, Truth or Consequences, Socorro, and Raton in New Mexico and Trinidad in Colorado in addition to Santa Fe and the other aforementioned destinations. However all of the new stops had ended by 1955. In 1955, Continental merged with Pioneer Air Lines and took over that carrier's service on the Albuquerque - Santa Fe - Clovis - Lubbock - Abilene - Ft. Worth - Dallas route. By 1959, the airline had introduced its first turbine powered airliner service into Santa Fe with the four engine, British-manufactured Vickers Viscount turboprop operating on four of its six daily flights. By 1963, Continental Airlines was growing rapidly with large jets and began transferring its route authority for its smaller cities to other carriers. The El Paso - Denver route with all the intermediate stops, including Santa Fe, was transferred to Frontier Airlines (1950-1986), and the Albuquerque - Dallas route with all the intermediate stops went to Trans-Texas Airways, which resulted in Continental no longer serving the Santa Fe airport.

Pioneer Air Lines began serving Santa Fe in 1948 with two daily round trip flights operated with Douglas DC-3s on a routing of Albuquerque - Santa Fe - Las Vegas, NM - Tucumcari, NM - Clovis, NM - Lubbock, TX - Abilene, TX - Mineral Wells, TX - Fort Worth, TX - Dallas, and by 1953, the airline was operating Martin 2-0-2 aircraft with direct, no-change-of-plane flights to Houston Hobby Airport making eight stops en route (the stops at Las Vegas, NM and Tucumcari, NM had been dropped). Pioneer was then acquired by and merged into Continental Airlines in 1955.

Trans World Airlines, (TWA), began Santa Fe service in 1948 by adding the city as a stop on its transcontinental mainline route using Douglas DC-3 aircraft. Initially, the daily routing was New York LaGuardia Airport - Pittsburgh - Columbus, OH - Dayton - Chicago Midway Airport - Kansas City - Topeka, KS - Wichita - Amarillo - Santa Fe - Winslow, AZ - Phoenix - Los Angeles. Albuquerque was later added as stop on the way to Winslow, and the Martin 4-0-4 aircraft replaced the DC-3s. By 1959, TWA was operating four engine Lockheed Constellation propliner service into Santa Fe with a daily routing of Chicago Midway Airport - Kansas City - Wichita - Amarillo - Santa Fe - Albuquerque - Los Angeles but only in the westbound direction. TWA's service to Santa Fe ended by late 1960.

Frontier Airlines (1950-1986) began flights to Santa Fe in 1963, replacing Continental Airlines at four stops made on the El Paso - Denver route. Frontier initially operated Douglas DC-3 and Convair 340 prop aircraft. By the mid-1960s, Frontier began operating Convair 580 turboprops from the airport nonstop to Denver and Albuquerque, with direct service to Phoenix, Tucson, and El Paso. In June 1972 Frontier (as well as Texas International Airlines) both ceased operating at Santa Fe citing unsafe runway conditions.

Trans-Texas Airways (TTa) began their Santa Fe service later in 1963, replacing Continental Airlines at all the stops made on the Albuquerque - Dallas route that Continental acquired from Pioneer Air Lines eight years prior. Initially, the carrier used Douglas DC-3 prop aircraft and later upgraded to Convair 600 turboprops. In 1967, TTa had introduced the first jet service into Santa Fe with the Douglas DC-9-10 on nonstop flights to Dallas Love Field with continuing direct service to Houston Hobby Airport. DC-9s were also flown to Albuquerque, Roswell and Midland/Odessa on a flight routing to Dallas and Houston from Santa Fe. Trans-Texas Airways changed its name to Texas International (TI) in 1969 and discontinued DC-9 jet service into Santa Fe by early 1970 but continued to serve the airport with the Convair 600's. In June, 1972, both Texas International and Frontier were forced to suspend all flights citing unsafe runway conditions. Neither carrier ever returned.

During the 1960s and 1970s, several small commuter airlines served Santa Fe, including Bison, Trans Central, The Santa Fe Airline Company, Mountain Air, Trans American Airways, Trans Western Airlines, Zia Airlines and Stahmann Farms. These carriers used a variety of commuter aircraft including Cessna 402's and Piper Navajo's on flights to Albuquerque and Denver. Zia had served Santa Fe from 1974 through 1980, also operating flights to Farmington, New Mexico for a short time and had upgraded to Handley Page Jetstream propjet aircraft in 1979.

Larger commuter and regional carriers served Santa Fe from the 1980s through the mid-2000s. A second Pioneer Airlines began flights to Denver in 1981 flying Beechcraft 99 and Swearingen Metro aircraft. This Pioneer Airlines went on to become a Continental Commuter feeder carrier on behalf of Continental Airlines in 1983 before ending service in 1985. This was the first major airline code-share service recorded in New Mexico.

Mesa Airlines began service in 1985 operating Cessna 208 Caravan, Beechcraft 99, Beechcraft 1300, and Beechcraft 1900 turboprops. Mesa first operated shuttle service between Santa Fe and Albuquerque then later began service to Denver. In 1995 Mesa's flights to Denver were upgraded to operate on behalf of United Airlines as United Express but all service ended in 1998 and was replaced by Great Lakes Aviation.

Mountain Air Express, a feeder carrier for Western Pacific Airlines, flew Dornier 328 propjets nonstop to Colorado Springs in the spring of 1997.

Aspen Mountain Air served Santa Fe from 1997 through 1998 with Dornier 328's on behalf of American Airlines by reinstating nonstop flights to Dallas/Ft. Worth. Although Aspen Mountain Air operated under a code-share agreement with American, they were not considered as American Eagle.

Great Lakes Aviation came to Santa Fe in 1998 by resuming the United Express flights to Denver after the Mesa Airlines contract expired. Great Lakes also used Beechcraft 1900D aircraft and had increased their Denver service to as many as twelve flights per day but then lost their United Express designation in early 2002. They continued to serve Santa Fe independently via their own identity until 2007 as no other United Express carriers had implemented service. Great Lakes returned to Santa Fe with flights to Denver, Phoenix, and Clovis for a short period in 2013 until ExpressJet operating Embraer ERJ-145 regional jets initiated service to Denver as United Express.

America West Express operated by Mesa Air/Air Midwest also briefly served Santa Fe in 2000 and 2001 with Beechcraft 1900s nonstop to Phoenix via a code sharing feeder service for America West Airlines.

=== Period without airlines ===
From December 11, 2007 until June 11, 2009, Santa Fe had no scheduled passenger airline service. In June 2007, the airport was upgraded to Class 1 status to allow regional jet flights. The city's government and interested airlines entered negotiations to split the cost of upgrades. In July 2007, Delta Air Lines announced new regional jet flights would commence in December 2007 between Santa Fe and Los Angeles International Airport (LAX) and Salt Lake City International Airport. American Eagle announced the introduction of regional jet flights to Dallas/Fort Worth International Airport and LAX beginning in December 2007 as well. However, all scheduled services were suspended indefinitely pending federal approval of an environmental assessment. Delta and American then removed flights to Santa Fe from their schedules, and it was unknown at that time if and when flights would begin.

The completion of the environmental impact statement was announced on February 26, 2009, but neither Delta or American Airlines immediately announced any resumption of their intentions to serve the facility, citing changed economic conditions.

=== Resumption of airline service ===
==== American Eagle ====
On March 12, 2009 the City of Santa Fe announced that American Eagle, the regional affiliate of American Airlines, would begin one daily flight to Dallas/Fort Worth International Airport (DFW) on June 11, 2009. On the day service began, American Eagle announced additional service to Los Angeles International Airport (LAX) beginning November 19, 2009 with one daily flight. These American Eagle flights to DFW and LAX were operated with Embraer ERJ-140 and ERJ-145 regional jet aircraft. By the spring of 2010, two additional flights to DFW were added followed with a fourth flight by the summer of 2011.

American Eagle Airlines operating under the American Eagle brand was changed to Envoy Air in 2014. Service was soon supplemented by ExpressJet Airlines and by SkyWest Airlines, both operating as American Eagle and both operating Canadair CRJ-200 and CRJ-700 regional jets. Service to Los Angeles, CA (LAX) ended on September 8, 2015 and new westbound service to Phoenix, AZ (PHX) began on December 15, 2016 with one daily flight. With the new Phoenix flight and an upgrade of aircraft type on the DFW flights to the CRJ-700, the year 2017 saw a 41 percent increase in passenger traffic at SAF. A second daily flight to Phoenix was added in May, 2019 utilizing a Canadair CRJ-900 regional jet operated by Mesa Airlines. This aircraft, seating up to 79 passengers, is the largest to serve Santa Fe. In March, 2020, two of the DFW flights were upgraded to CRJ-900's and by summer of 2020, plans called for five daily flights to DFW, three of which would utilize the CRJ-900 and two on the 76-seat Embraer 175. Service to Los Angeles (LAX) was also planned to resume with one flight on Saturdays only. All of these plans came to a halt in mid-March 2020 with the outbreak of the COVID-19 virus. Instead, service was scaled back to three daily flights to DFW only using CRJ-700 aircraft. The Phoenix flights were discontinued by the end of June, 2020 and resumed in June, 2021 along with up to four daily flights to DFW. A Saturday only flight to Los Angeles was also operated during the summer of 2021 and a nonstop flight to Austin, TX (AUS) was flown on Saturdays only from October 6 through November 4, 2023. In January, 2023, the two Phoenix flights began operating with the larger CRJ-900 and Embraer 175 regional jets and during February, 2023, two of the three DFW flights as well as both PHX flights operated with Embraer 175's. However, by March, 2023, most American Eagle flights were scaled back to CRJ-700's. Service to Phoenix now fluctuates between one and two daily flights. A fifth daily nonstop flight to DFW was added in May, 2024 and a sixth daily nonstop operated during September and October of 2024. Service is now scalled back to four daily flights to DFW for the winter months and increases to six during the summer. A new daily flight to Los Angeles will begin in October, 2025 and a seasonal nonstop flight to Chicago O'Hare Airport will begin with the 2025/2026 holiday season.

==== United Express ====
On December 19, 2012, it was announced that ExpressJet, operating as United Express on behalf of United Airlines, would initiate twice daily regional jet service to Denver International Airport (DEN) beginning May 1, 2013. These flights were operated with 50-seat Embraer ERJ-145 regional jet aircraft and comprise the first ever nonstop jet service between Santa Fe and Denver. This service was replaced by Trans States Airlines as United Express in summer, 2015 which also operated Embraer ERJ-145 regional jets. Service had increased to as many as five daily flights to Denver in October 2019. For the summer of 2020, four daily flights were planned and all flights were to operate by SkyWest Airlines with the larger CRJ-700 aircraft. Instead, due to the COVID-19 virus outbreak, service was cut back to only one daily flight to Denver on SkyWest using the smaller 50-seat CRJ-200. Service increased back to two daily nonstops to Denver by the Fall of 2021 and to three daily in the Spring of 2023. All flights were then operated by CommuteAir using Embraer 145 regional jets. On March 9, 2024, a new nonstop flight to Houston Texas began operating on Saturdays only. On May 23, 2024, a fourth Denver flight was reinstated and all Denver flights began operating by SkyWest with the larger CRJ-700. On December 3, 2024, SkyWest introduced the larger Embraer 175 on its Denver flights. The Houston flight was suspended for the winter of 2024/2025 but was reinstated for the month of March, 2025 and again during the summer months on Saturdays only.

== New Mexico Army National Guard ==
The airport is home to an Army Aviation Support Facility (AASF) for Company C, 1st General Support Aviation Battalion, 171st Aviation Regiment (C/1-171 AVN) of the New Mexico Army National Guard, flying Sikorsky UH-60 Blackhawk helicopters.

== Facilities ==
Santa Fe Regional Airport covers 2,128 acres (861 ha) at an elevation of 6,348 feet (1,935 m). It has three asphalt runways: 2/20 is 8,366 by 150 feet (2,550 x 46 m); 15/33 is 6,316 by 100 feet (1,925 x 30 m); 10/28 is 6,301 by 75 feet (1,921 x 23 m).

For the 12-month period ending December 31, 2021, the airport had 57,300 aircraft operations, an average of 157 per day; of these 83% were general aviation, 6% were military, 6% commercial, and 5% air taxi. A total of 190 aircraft were based at the airport: 130 single-engine and 22 multi-engine airplanes, 23 jet aircraft, 11 military aircraft, and 3 helicopters.

The data below lists annual total aircraft operations from 2003 to 2013 from the FAA's Air Traffic Activity System. Average annual increase in aircraft operations was 0.88% over the last 10 years.

Aircraft operations: SAF 2003–2013
Calendar year	Aircraft operations	%
2003	80,538	
2004	83,431	3.59%
2005	74,997	−10.11%
2006	76,416	1.89%
2007	79,356	3.84%
2008	73,716	−7.11%
2009	70,112	−4.88%
2010	75,646	7.89%
2011	66,989	−11.44%
2012	65,456	−2.29%
2013	71,932	27.41%

== Airlines and destinations ==
=== Passenger ===
Airlines	Destinations
American Eagle	Dallas/Fort Worth, Los Angeles, Phoenix–Sky Harbor; Seasonal: Chicago–O'Hare
United Express	Denver

Destinations map
Destinations from Santa Fe Regional Airport
Red = Year-round destination
Green = Seasonal destination
Blue = Future destination

=== Statistics ===
Carrier shares (August 2025 – July 2026)
Carrier	Passengers (arriving and departing)
SkyWest	429,000(99.97%)
PSA	120(0.03%)

Top domestic destinations from SAF (August 2025 – July 2026)
Rank	Airport	Passengers	Airlines
1	Dallas/Fort Worth International (DFW)	96,780	American
2	Denver International (DEN)	75,140	United
3	Phoenix–Sky Harbor, Arizona (PHX)	24,270	American
4	Los Angeles, California (LAX)	13,190	American
5	Chicago–O'Hare, Illinois (ORD)	5,340	American

=== Annual passenger traffic ===
==== Annual passenger traffic (enplaned + deplaned) at SAF, 2011 through present ====
Year	Passengers	Change
2011	86,766	
2012	94,243	
2013	137,127	
2014	151,177	
2015	146,333	
2016	146,000 (est.)	
2017	205,794	
2018	230,114	
2019	283,238	
2020	98,479	
2021	192,000	
2022	247,000	
2023	282,000	
2024	360,000	
2025	402,000	
