= Lone Star Airlines =

American airline based in Texas

IATA	ICAO	Call sign
AD	LSS	LONESTAR
- Founded: 1984; 42 years ago
- Ceased operations: 1998; 28 years ago
- Hubs: Dallas/Fort Worth International Airport

Lone Star Airlines was an American regional airline that operated both domestic and international flights. For much of the airline's life its headquarters were located in the Fort Worth Stockyards in Fort Worth, Texas. The airline's largest hub was located at Dallas/Fort Worth International Airport. The airline filed for bankruptcy in August, 1998 and was liquidated in October, 1998.

== History ==
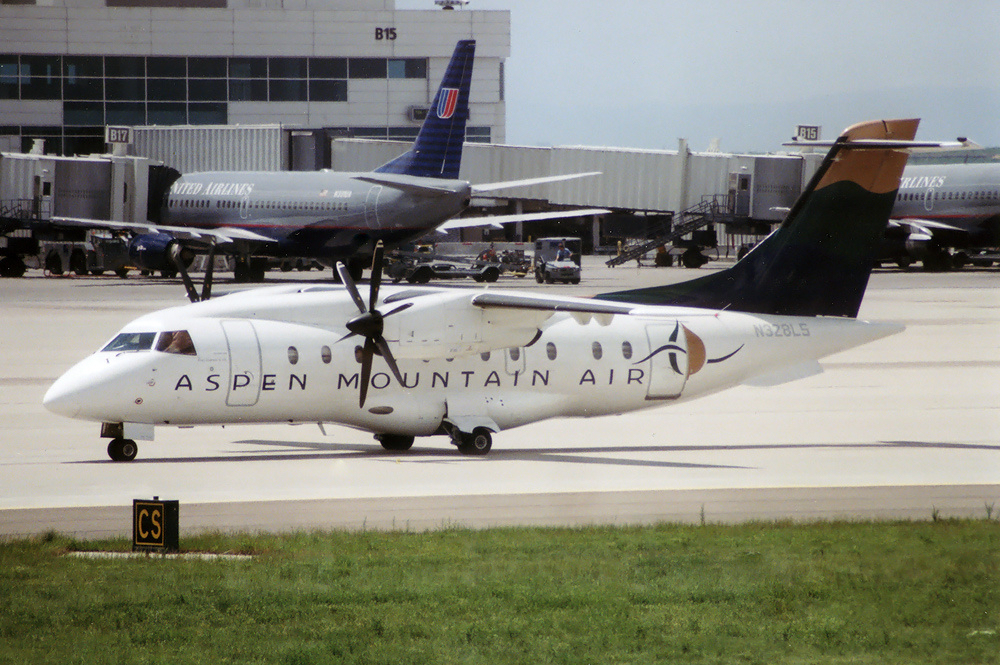
Aspen Mountain Air Dornier 328

Lone Star was founded in 1984 in Stillwater, Oklahoma, as Exec Express Inc. by Phil Trenary (later President of Pinnacle Airlines), the company moved its headquarters to Fort Worth, Texas, in 1987. Exec Express Inc. operating as Exec Express Commuter Airlines later became Exec Express II Inc. and eventually operated under the d/b/a's of Lone Star Airlines and Aspen Mountain Air. In order to have both names on the same ticket stock a third d/b/a was created "Aspen Mountain Air/Lone Star Airlines" The airline became an American Airlines (AMR Corporation) and Frontier Airlines code sharing partner. In 1996 Professional Pilot magazine selected Lone Star Airlines to receive the Regional Airline Teamwork Award. By 1997 the airline was serving 21 cities in 8 states Arkansas, Colorado, Florida, Missouri, Montana, New Mexico, Tennessee, and Texas. International non-stop service to Mexico was provided from DFW International Airport. Federal EAS subsidies approximated 20% of total revenues in 1996. Total revenues were projected to exceed $24 million in 1997.

=== Timelines ===
- In the 1980s,
  - Exec Express primarily operated federally subsidized EAS (Essential Air Service) routes feeding DFW from Arkansas, Oklahoma and Texas. For a brief period in 1987 & 1988 the company provided direct service to Houston, San Antonio and Austin (TX) from a hub at Fort Worth Meacham International Airport.
- 1988 and beyond
  - Exec Express II greatly expanded the number of routes, adding operations in Indiana, Louisiana and Missouri with new EAS destinations as well as unsubsidized destinations such as Alpine and Nacogdoches, Texas; Natchez, Louisiana; and Joplin, Missouri. A major maintenance base was established in Hot Springs, AR. and the company began operating under the d/b/a Lone Star Airlines in July, 1991. With the addition of the high speed Dornier 328 aircraft in 1994, the company was able to operate long range (over 600 miles) non stop flights from DFW to locations in Mexico, Colorado, Tennessee, and Florida.
- 1993
  - With the interest and assistance of investors in Mexico, the airline began preparations for service to several destinations in Mexico and ordered the Dornier 328 to service these routes as well as some of its domestic routes. The peso was devalued shortly after operations commenced. Demand for service to Saltillo and Hermosillo was weak and service was discontinued shortly after it began. Torreón and Chihuahua City were more successful.
- 1995
  - The airline decided to add service to Roswell and Ruidoso, New Mexico, Knoxville, Tennessee, and Aspen, Colorado. Scheduled airline operations into Aspen, require special authorization from the FAA. Following extensive coordination and assistance from Daimler Benz / Dornier, Honeywell Avionics, Aspen city and airport authorities, aeronautical engineers, the FAA and others; qualifications, procedures and training were established; special operating authority was granted and direct service between DFW and Aspen commenced.
- Late 1996
  - Having demonstrated its ability to successfully service the Aspen community, the airline was acquired by Peak International, an aviation group out of Aspen, Colorado. funded largely by Skico and the Crown family. Colorado service then began operating under the d/b/a of Aspen Mountain Air (AMA) and the focus of Aspen service was changed from Dallas / Aspen to Denver / Aspen in direct competition with United Airlines. By late 1997, the airline was expanding rapidly; adding additional aircraft and destinations. New destinations included, Pensacola, Fl; Bozeman, MT and Santa Fe, New Mexico. The airline began code-sharing with American Airlines but only on flights operated with the Dornier 328 aircraft, not those operated with the Swearingen Metros. The headquarters were relocated from the Fort Worth Stockyards to Grand Prairie, Texas.
- 1998
  - In concluding its response to AMA's request for an exemption to limits on its fleet expansion, the DOT (United States Department of Transportation) wrote: "Notwithstanding AMA's expectations that its expanded operations would prove profitable, they were not and, despite the infusion of funds from its owner, the carrier's financial situation deteriorated until, on August 7, 1998 AMA filed for Chapter 11 bankruptcy protection." The airline was liquidated in October 1998. Some of the assets and crews went to Air Wisconsin. Some of the routes were taken over by Big Sky Airlines

== Hubs and destinations ==
Dallas/Fort Worth

- From the airline's main hub of operations at Dallas/Fort Worth International Airport direct flights were operated to:
  - Aspen, Colorado
  - Pensacola, Florida
  - Natchez, Mississippi
  - Knoxville, Tennessee
  - Joplin, Missouri
  - Columbia, Missouri
- ARKANSAS
  - Camden, El Dorado, Harrison, Hot Springs, Jonesboro, Mountain Home, and Texarkana
- NEW MEXICO
  - Roswell, Ruidoso, and Santa Fe
- TEXAS
  - Alpine, Brownwood, Del Rio, El Paso, Nacogdoches, Paris, Temple, and Texarkana
- OKLAHOMA
  - Altus, Enid, McAlester, Ponca City, and Stillwater
- MEXICO
  - Chihuahua, Hermosillo, Saltillo and Torreón

EL Paso

- From El Paso direct flights were operated to:
  - Chihuahua, Mexico
  - Ruidoso, New Mexico, Roswell, New Mexico, and Dallas/Fort Worth, Texas

St. Louis

- From St Louis, Missouri, direct flights were operated to:
  - Bloomington, Muncie, and Terre Haute (Indiana); Harrison, Hot Springs, and Mountain Home (Arkansas); Joplin (Missouri), and Dallas-Ft. Worth (Texas)

Denver

- From Denver, Colorado, non stop flights were operated to:
  - Aspen, Colorado, Sioux City, Iowa, Bozeman, Montana, and Dallas-Ft. Worth, Texas

Fort Worth

- From Fort Worth, Texas, non stop flights were operated to:
  - Austin, Houston, and San Antonio (Texas)

FEDERAL ESSENTIAL AIR SERVICE COMMUNITIES, (EAS)

- Arkansas
  - Camden, El Dorado, Harrison, Hot Springs and Jonesboro.
- Indiana
  - Terre Haute
- Oklahoma
  - Enid, Ponca City and Stillwater
- Texas
  - Brownwood, Paris and Temple

== Fleet ==
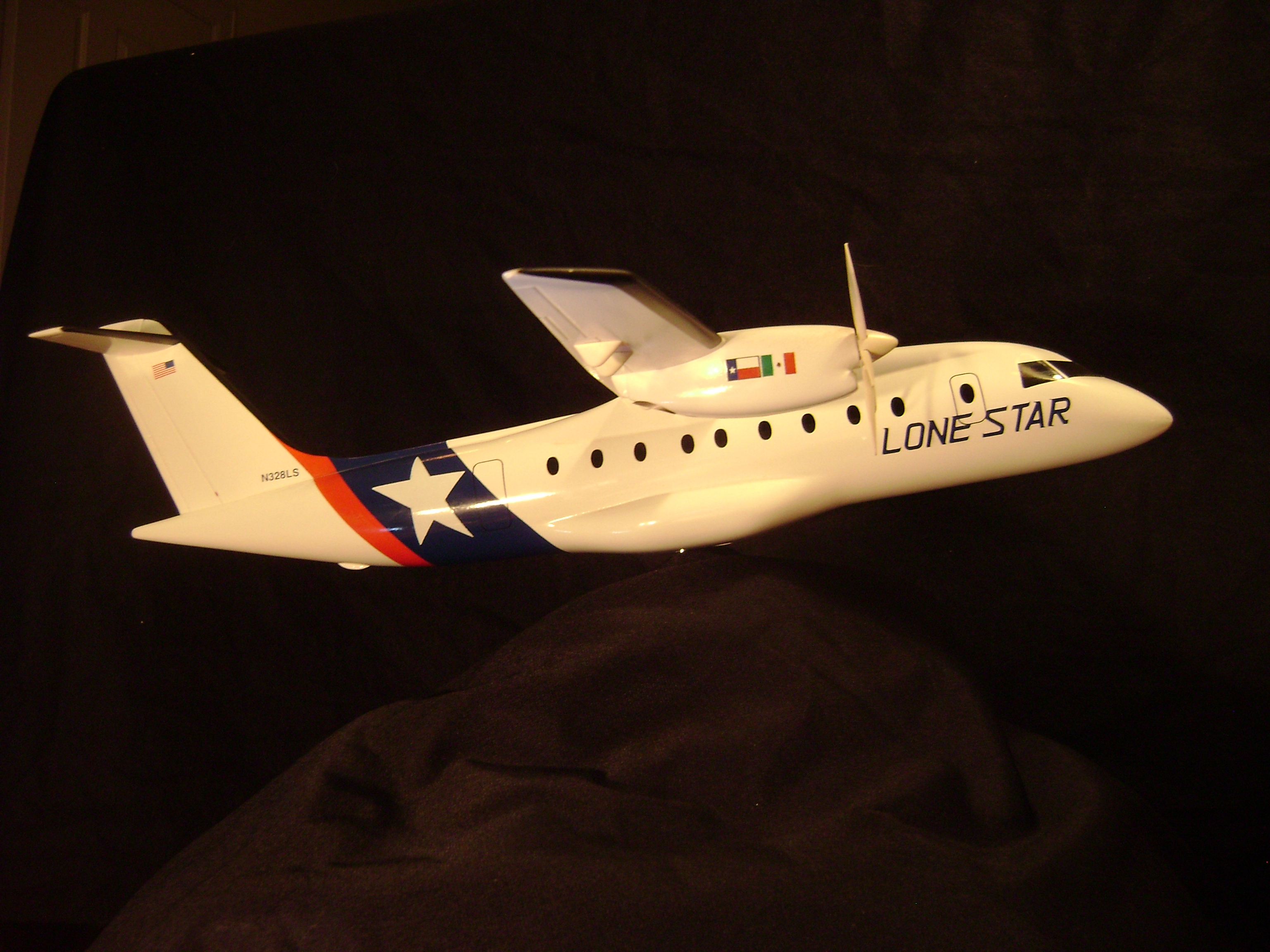
Model of a Dornier 328 in Lone Star colors.

- The airline began service with Piper PA-31 Navajo aircraft. Later, Dornier 228, Beechcraft Model 99s, and Embraer 120 Brasilia's were added. These aircraft were retired as the airline began taking deliveries of the Fairchild Metro III, Fairchild Metro 23 and the Dornier 328.
- The relatively high operating costs of the Dornier 328 were minimized by operating it on long range flights thus reducing the number of takeoffs, landings and engine starts per hour. During its operation, Lone Star was recognized by Dornier for operating the longest stage lengths of any Dornier operator.
- APALS (Autonomous Precision Approach Landing System). Lone Star Airlines became Lockheed Martin's APALS launch customer in 1996. The intent of the system was to provide precision approach capabilities at airports that did not have the equipment and procedures to support a precision approach. APALS equipped aircraft would be able to safely and successfully operate into and from airports under conditions not available to other aircraft.

https://www.flightglobal.com/lone-star-launches-apals-map-based-landing-system/11110.article

== Training ==
Following the introduction of Metro III aircraft, Lone Star Airlines incorporated state of the art, full motion aircraft flight simulators into its training program.

Lone Star Airlines and Flight Safety International ("FlightSafety") pioneered a new pilot hiring practice. Pilot applicants who met Lone Star Airlines initial hiring requirements, were first interviewed, screened and tested by FlightSafety. Upon review of these results, Lone Star Airlines would select pilots for company interviews and subsequent job offers contingent upon the pilot's successful completion of flight training at one of FlightSafety's flight simulator training centers.

== Operating authority ==
Besides domestic scheduled passenger service, Lone Star Airlines was granted authority to operate passenger service to the following additional areas:

- Caribbean Islands & Haiti ----- 1993 ------ Extended Overwater
- Mexico Operations ------------- 1994 ------ International Service
- Aspen, Colorado --------------- 1995 ------ Special Use Airport
- Rifle, Colorado --------------- 1995 ------ Special Use Airport
- South America ----------------- 1996 ------ International Service

== Misc ==
IATA Airline Code: AD

ICAO Airline Code: LSS

DOT Certificate ID: EQGA

Call Sign: Hustler, Lone Star (when it began using the DBA Lone Star)

- In 1960 an air carrier named "Lone Star Airlines" operated three Martin passenger aircraft between Dallas and Houston. The flight attendants wore "hot pants". The operation lasted only six months.
- A Lone Star Airlines Fairchild Metro III aircraft was provided and featured in "Angie (film)", starring Geena Davis and released in 1994. The Captain assigned for transport and liaison was Jonathan Smith.
- The airline briefly operated an Embraer Brazilia EMB-120RT aircraft while awaiting delivery of the Dornier 328 aircraft.
- The airline traditionally held an annual Christmas party and provided dedicated aircraft to gather employees throughout their system for the event.
- Lone Star logo and artwork were created by Ed Tavender. http://www.linkedin.com/pub/ed-tavender/6/92b/701
- Dornier aircraft production was acquired from Daimler Benz by Fairchild Aircraft.
- In 1998 AMA did wet lease two Metro aircraft from Merlin Express, an aircraft operating division of Fairchild Aircraft later Fairchild-Dornier Aircraft acquired by M7 Aerospace
- Aspen Mountain Air/Lone Star Airlines operations were separate and distinct from Mountain Air Express, "MAX"; an air carrier that operated Dornier 328 aircraft from Colorado Springs, Colorado and affiliated with Western Pacific Airlines.
- Former executives of Aspen Mountain Air founded Aspen Executive Jet in 2003. "AEXJet" was based in Aspen, Colorado, and served nine major metropolitan regions throughout the U.S., including New York, Chicago, Los Angeles, San Francisco, South Florida, Dallas, Houston, Austin and Atlanta.

== See also ==
- List of defunct airlines of the United States
- Dornier 328
- Dornier Flugzeugwerke
- Fairchild Aircraft
- Martin 4-0-4
- Horizon Air
- Pinnacle Airlines
- Skyway Airlines
- Western Pacific Airlines
