= Alpine–Casparis Municipal Airport =

Airport in Texas, United States of America

- IATA: ALE; ICAO: none; FAA LID: E38

Summary
- Airport type: Public
- Owner: City of Alpine
- Serves: Alpine, Texas
- Elevation AMSL: 4,514.4 ft (1,376.0 m)
- Coordinates: 30.38673°N 103.68050°W

Map
- Location within Texas

Runways
Direction	Length		Surface
Direction	ft	m	Surface
1/19	6,003	1,830	Asphalt
5/23	5,018	1,529	Asphalt

Statistics (2006)
- Aircraft operations: 9,350
- Based aircraft: 32
- Source: Federal Aviation Administration

Alpine–Casparis Municipal Airport (IATA: ALE, FAA LID: E38) is a city-owned public-use airport located 2 miles (3.2 km) northwest of the central business district of Alpine, a city in Brewster County, Texas, United States. It supports two small runways and is not meant for large commercial planes.

The airport provides Alpine with a modest sum of money. Being the only airport in the general area, and very close to the largest city in the county, makes it an adequate stop for small commercial or private aircraft. It is not uncommon for the airport's three hangars to be full during the summer, when air travel in the area is at its highest. Alpine–Casparis Municipal Airport earns the city about US$908,000 a year. The airport provides 17 jobs to the city, and has an average of 2,100 patrons annually. The airport itself is used for recreational flying, flight training, small cargo shipping, refueling stops, and medical flights.

== Former airline service ==
The airport previously had scheduled passenger air service operated by Lone Star Airlines, a commuter air carrier, during the early 1990s flown with Fairchild Swearingen Metroliner propjets. In 1992, Lone Star was flying nonstop to Austin (AUS) with continuing direct service to Dallas/Fort Worth International Airport (DFW). By 1993, Lone Star was continuing to fly direct one stop service to Dallas/Fort Worth via an intermediate stop in Brownwood, Texas. In 1978, Alpine-based Big Bend Airways was operating flights to Midland/Odessa (MAF) and Lubbock (LBB).

Trans-Texas Airways (TTa) also served Alpine via the Marfa Municipal Airport from the late 1940s to the late 1950s with Douglas DC-3 "Starliners". By 1964, Solar Airlines was serving the Alpine airport with Beechcraft 18 twin prop aircraft operating roundtrip flights twice a day on routing of Presidio, TX - Marfa, TX - Alpine - Fort Stockton, TX - Pecos, TX - Monahans, TX - Wink, TX - Dallas Love Field (DAL).

== Accident ==
On 4 July 2010, a twin-engine Cessna 421 operated by O’Hara Flying Service II LP of Amarillo flying as an air ambulance was en route to Midland, Texas when it crashed in a field 1 mile (1.6 km) east of Alpine–Casparis Municipal Airport, killing all five persons on board.

== Facilities and aircraft ==
Alpine–Casparis Municipal Airport covers an area of 196 acres (79 ha) which contains two asphalt paved runways: 1/19 measuring 6,003 ft × 75 ft (1,830 m × 23 m) and 5/23 measuring 5,018 ft × 60 ft (1,529 m × 18 m).

For the 12-month period ending 17 May 2021, the airport had 13,186 aircraft operations, an average of 36 per day: 99% general aviation and 1% military. There are 46 aircraft based at this airport: 85% single-engine, 6% multi-engine and 9% helicopter.

The airport's only scheduled service as of January 2013 is a Monday through Friday cargo flight operated by Martinaire on behalf of UPS to Midland, Texas.

== See also ==
- List of airports in Texas
