= Del Rio International Airport =

Airport in Val Verde County, Texas, U.S.

- IATA: DRT; ICAO: KDRT; FAA LID: DRT

Summary
- Airport type: Public
- Owner: Del Rio / Val Verde County
- Serves: Del Rio, Texas
- Elevation AMSL: 1,002 ft (305 m)
- Coordinates: 29°22′27″N 100°55′38″W
- Website: https://www.cityofdelrio.com/government/departments/international-airport/

Map
- Location within Texas Location within the United States

Runways
Direction	Length		Surface
Direction	ft	m	Surface
13/31	6,300	1,920	Asphalt

Statistics (2010)
- Aircraft operations: 15,357
- Based aircraft: 42
- Source: Federal Aviation Administration

Del Rio International Airport (IATA: DRT, ICAO: KDRT, FAA LID: DRT) is two miles northwest of Del Rio, in Val Verde County, Texas, United States. It is used for general aviation, and, being near Laughlin Air Force Base, it is often used by USAF students during training flights.

== Facilities ==
The airport covers 268 acres (108 ha) at an elevation of 1,002 feet (305 m). Its single runway, 13/31, is 6,300 by 100 feet (1,920 by 30 m) asphalt. In 2010 the airport had 15,357 aircraft operations, an average of 42 per day: 83% general aviation, 9% airline, and 8% air taxi. 42 aircraft were then based at the airport: 79% single-engine, 12% multi-engine, and 9% helicopter. Federal Aviation Administration records say the airport had 16,028 passenger boardings (enplanements) in calendar year 2008, 13,436 in 2009, and 13,180 in 2010. The National Plan of Integrated Airport Systems for 2011–2015 categorized it as a primary commercial service airport (more than 10,000 enplanements per year).

The airport is owned by the City of Del Rio. A seven-member airport advisory board, appointed by the City Council, monitors the development and operations of the airport. The terminal has counter space to accommodate two airlines, a large waiting area post security with restrooms and vending machines, and one baggage carousel. Boarding is conducted via a mobile covered ramp. The terminal has two positions for aircraft to park at, and a third used for exclusively customs screening. The terminal was last served by twice-daily American Airlines service operated by regional partner SkyWest Airlines on their 65-seat Canadair CRJ 700 aircraft, which ended April 3, 2023. The Texas Department of Public Safety (DPS) Air Patrol Unit has a station at the airport. The city is working on a 1,500-foot (460 m) expansion of the runway, when completed will have a total of 7,800 feet (2,400 m). The runway expansion is due to Laughlin AFB future arrivals of the new Boeing T-7A Red Hawks training jets which will also utilize the airport for training.

FedEx has a shipping center on the north boundary of the airport. They serve Del Rio with two Cessna 208 Caravans with daily service to San Antonio. Ameriflight operates Beechcraft 1900 from a ramp position with daily service to San Antonio International Airport on behalf of United Parcel Service.

== Airlines and destinations ==
=== Cargo service ===
Airlines	Destinations
Ameriflight	San Antonio
FedEx Feeder operated by Baron Aviation	San Antonio

Charter air cargo companies provide adhoc service between Del Rio and points in North America for automotive part manufacturers in Ciudad Acuña and Piedras Negras, Mexico. The following airlines and their respective aircraft fly routes to Del Rio : Ameristar (DC-9), USA Jet (MD-83/88 and Falcon 20), IFL Group (Boeing 727-200 and Falcon 20), Royal Air Freight (Falcon 20 and Learjet 35), Pak West (Swearinger Metroliner), Berry Aviation (Embraer 120), and Kalitta Charters ii

(Boeing 737-300 and DC-9).

=== Future service ===
The City of Del Rio applied, in 2023, to the Department of Transportation for a Small Community Air Service Development Grant. The grant includes a letter of support from the carrier Skywest Charters-a spinoff of SkyWest Airlines-which would operate 30-seat CRJ-200 aircraft under FAA Part 135 operations. The letter states the carrier is interested in providing service between Del Rio and Houston George Bush Intercontinental Airport, and is signed by Brad Link, Skywest Charters director of operations.

=== Former service ===
For four or five years starting in 1949 Trans-Texas Airways Douglas DC-3s flew from Del Rio to El Paso, Houston, San Antonio, and other Texas cities, but they used Val Verde County Airport east of town. That airport 29.377°N 100.821°W closed in 1959–60. The first airline at the present airport was Wild Goose Airlines in 1964, on their flights between Eagle Pass and San Antonio. Davies/Quastler says they flew Aztecs.

Between May and November 2017 Texas Sky Airlines, operated by Contour Aviation, scheduled a daily British Aerospace Jetstream between Del Rio International Airport and Dallas/Fort Worth International Airport.

From June 7, 2012, until April 2013 ExpressJet (United Express) Embraer ERJ-145s served Del Rio, flying nonstop to Houston Intercontinental Airport. The route previously used turboprops. Continental Connection had served Del Rio before the merger of Continental Airlines with United Airlines. The Continental Connection service nonstop to Houston Intercontinental was flown by Colgan Air Saab 340s.

Other commuter airlines at Del Rio included Lone Star Airlines (which also operated as Aspen Mountain Air), Texas National Airlines, Alamo Commuter Airlines, Amistad Airlines, and Wise Airlines.

== See also ==
- List of airports in Texas
