= Enid Woodring Regional Airport =

Airport in Oklahoma, United States

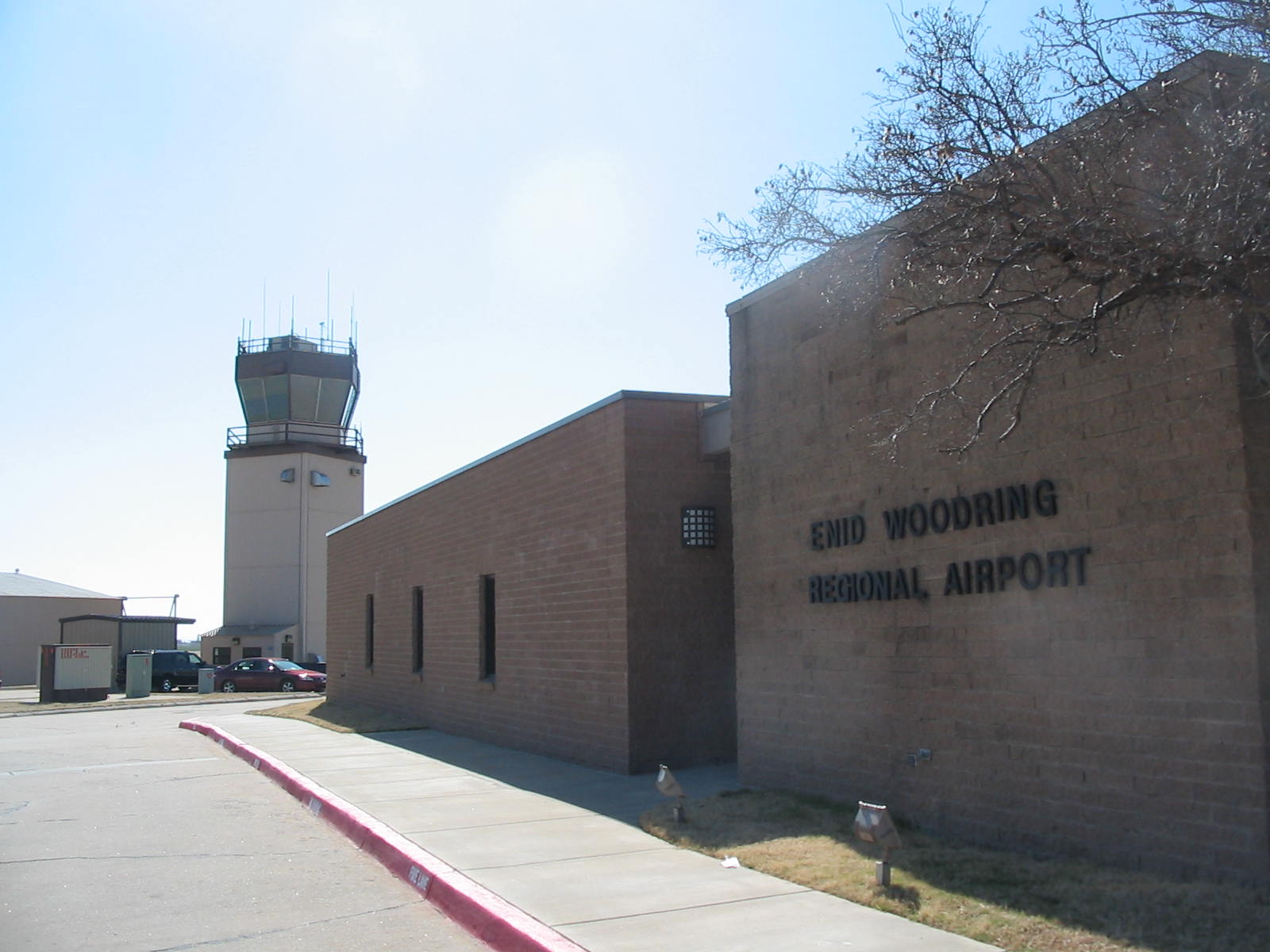
- Terminal and control tower

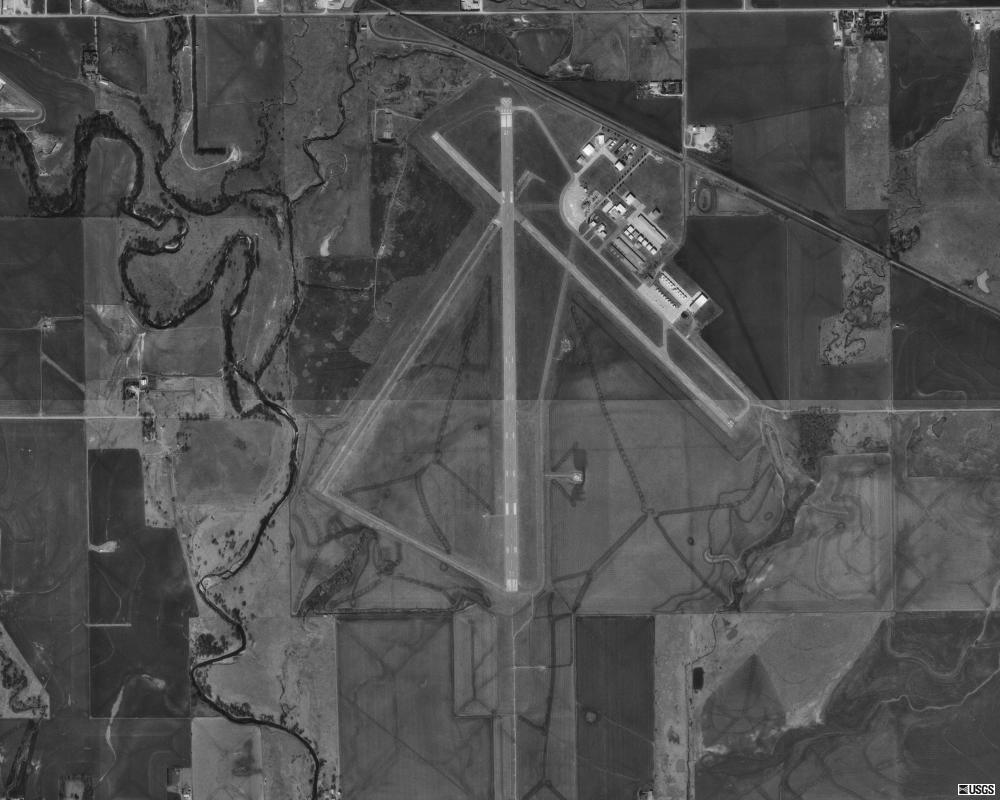
- USGS 1995 orthophoto
- IATA: WDG; ICAO: KWDG; FAA LID: WDG

Summary
- Airport type: Public
- Owner: City of Enid
- Serves: Enid, Oklahoma
- Elevation AMSL: 1,167 ft (356 m)
- Coordinates: 36°22′42″N 097°47′20″W
- Website: www.enid.org/...

Map
- Location of airport in Oklahoma

Runways
Direction	Length		Surface
Direction	ft	m	Surface
17/35	8,613	2,625	Concrete
13/31	3,150	960	Asphalt

Statistics (2019)
- Aircraft operations (year ending 4/24/2019): 35,000
- Based aircraft: 73
- Source: Federal Aviation Administration

Enid Woodring Regional Airport (IATA: WDG, ICAO: KWDG, FAA LID: WDG) is a city-owned, public-use airport located four nautical miles (5 mi, 7 km) southeast of the central business district of Enid, a city in Garfield County, Oklahoma, United States. It is also referred to as Woodring Airport and was formerly known as Enid Woodring Municipal Airport. This airport is included in the National Plan of Integrated Airport Systems for 2011–2015, which categorized it as a general aviation facility. It is mostly used for military training flights based at Vance Air Force Base.

Scheduled passenger flights on Great Lakes Airlines to Denver and Liberal were discontinued in August 2006. The service was subsidized by the Essential Air Service program. From the early 1950s well into the 1960s, the airport was served by Central Airlines.

A new terminal building was built in 2019 and now contains the FBO service area, a Flight Planning Room, a Pilot Lounge, and conference room. There is also a restaurant in the terminal building. Outdoors is the Woodring Wall of Honor and Veterans Park, which honors Oklahoma veterans. Ceremonies are held annually on Memorial Day to honor fallen soldiers. A veterans museum at the site is open Thursdays through Saturdays.

== History ==
Enid was the first city of Oklahoma to have a municipally owned airport. The airport was dedicated in 1928, and built on 80 acres of land donated by a citizen backed by the American Legion, and Enid passed a $50,000 bond, making it the first city in Oklahoma to use bonds to fund an airport.

=== I. A. Woodring ===
Enid's Airport was renamed Enid Woodring Municipal Airport on May 30, 1933, after Lieutenant Irvin A. (Bert) Woodring, born February 1, 1902, in Enid, Oklahoma. Irvin A. Woodring was one of the U.S. Army Air Corps' "Three Musketeers of Aviation" along with fellow pilots John J. Williams and William Lewers Cornelius. The group performed aerobatics at the National Air Races. J.J. Williams died in practice at Mines Field, Los Angeles on September 11, 1928. Charles Lindbergh, for whom the three had served as escorts, filled in following Williams death. Two weeks later, W. L. Cornelius died when his plane collided with another plane. On January 20, 1933, Bert Woodring fell 2,000 feet to his death over Wright Field in Dayton, Ohio, when his Consolidated P-30 fighter exploded in mid-air.

=== Historical airline service ===
Enid Woodring Regional Airport was served by commercial airlines from 1949 through 2006 with flights to Dallas, Denver, Kansas City, Oklahoma City, Tulsa, and Wichita. Central Airlines was the first carrier beginning in 1949. In 1967 Central merged with Frontier Airlines (1950-1986) which continued service until 1979. Several commuter airlines then served Enid which included: Air Midwest (1979-1981), Metro Airlines (1981-1986), Lone Star Airlines (1986-1998), Midcontinent Airlines dba as Braniff Express (1989), feeder carrier for Braniff (1983-1990), Big Sky Airlines (1999-2002), Mesa Airlines (2002-2005), and Great Lakes Airlines (2005-2006).

== Facilities and aircraft ==
Enid Woodring Regional Airport covers an area of 1,256 acres (508 ha) at an elevation of 1,167 feet (356 m) above mean sea level. It has two runways: 17/35 is 8,613 by 100 feet (2625 x 30 m) with a concrete surface; 13/31 is 3,150 by 108 feet (960 x 33 m) with an asphalt surface.

For the 12-month period ending April 24, 2019, the airport had 35,000 aircraft operations, an average of 96 per day: 66% military, 32% general aviation, and 2% air taxi. At that time there were 73 aircraft based at this airport: 64 single-engine, 5 multi-engine, 3 jet, and 1 ultralight.

== Gallery ==
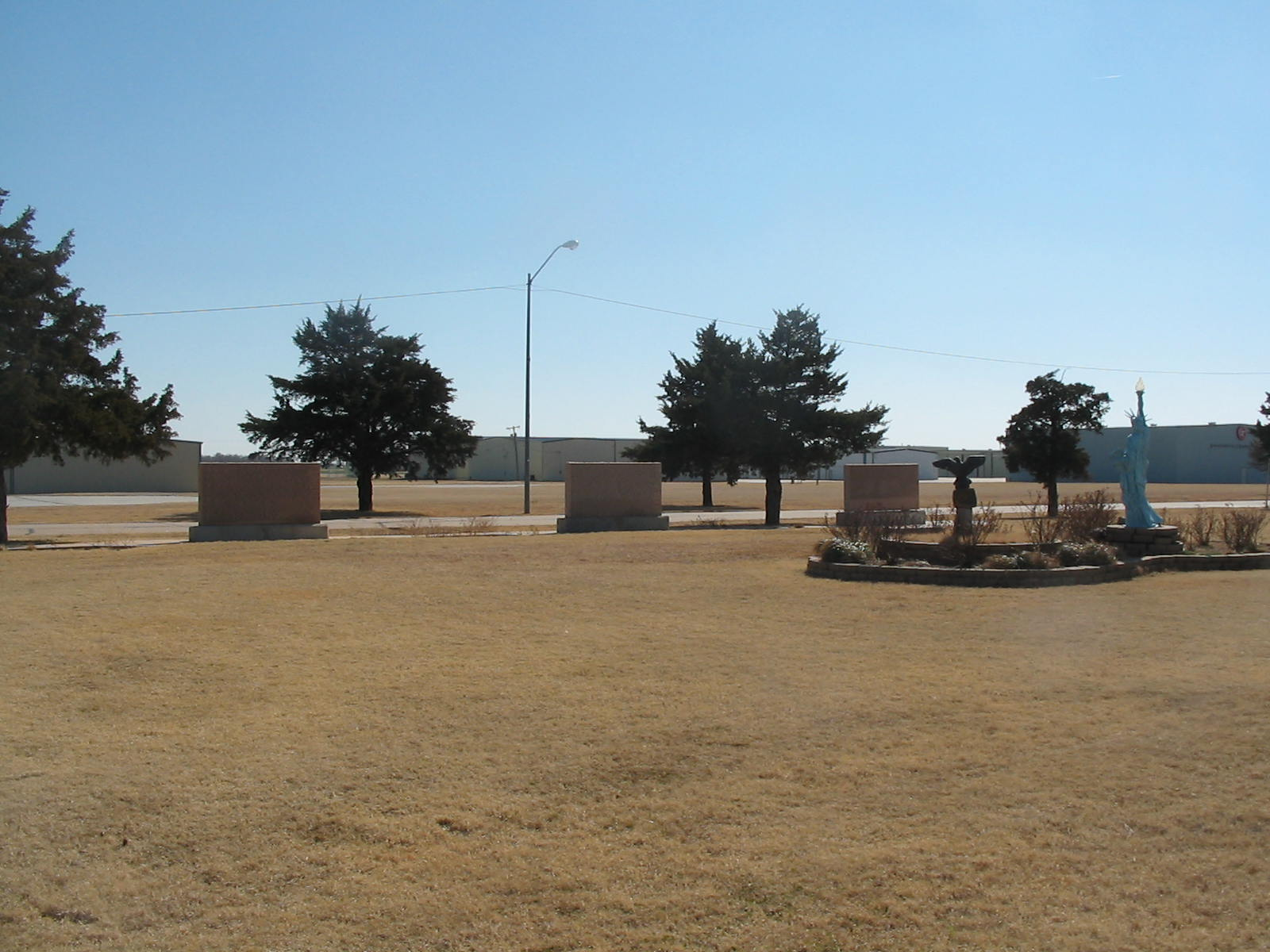
Woodring Wall of Honor

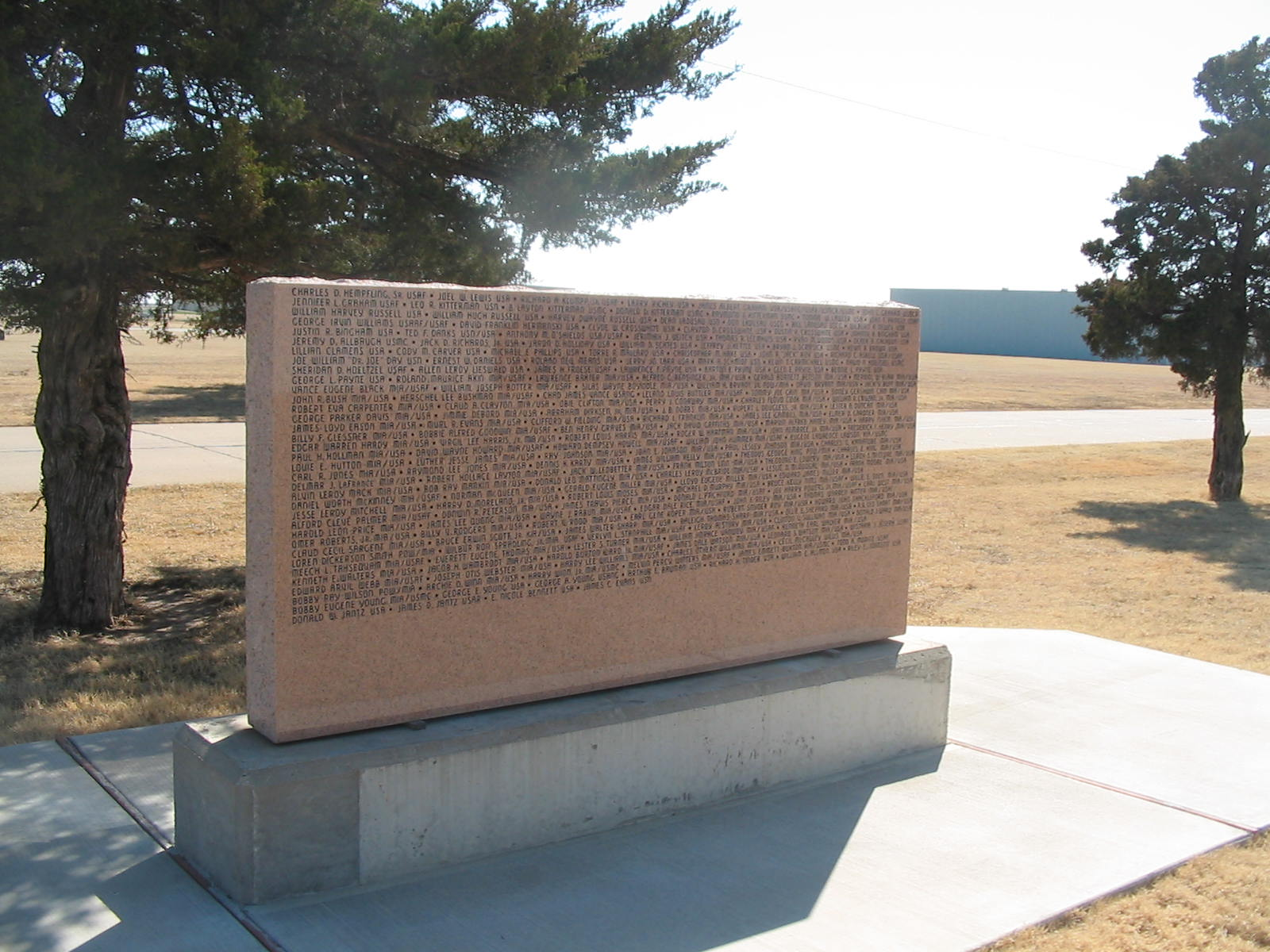
Woodring Wall of Honor

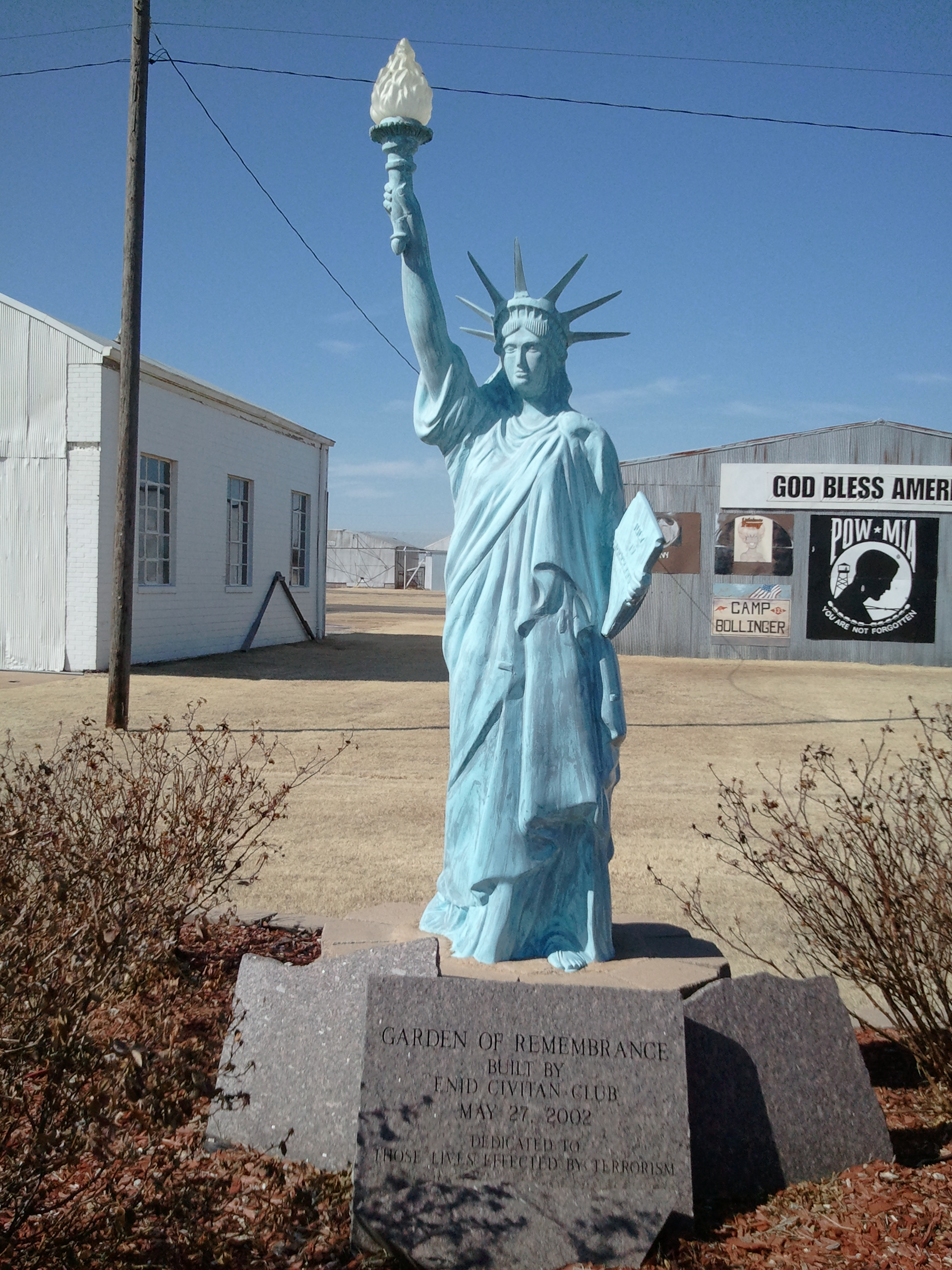
Statue of Liberty

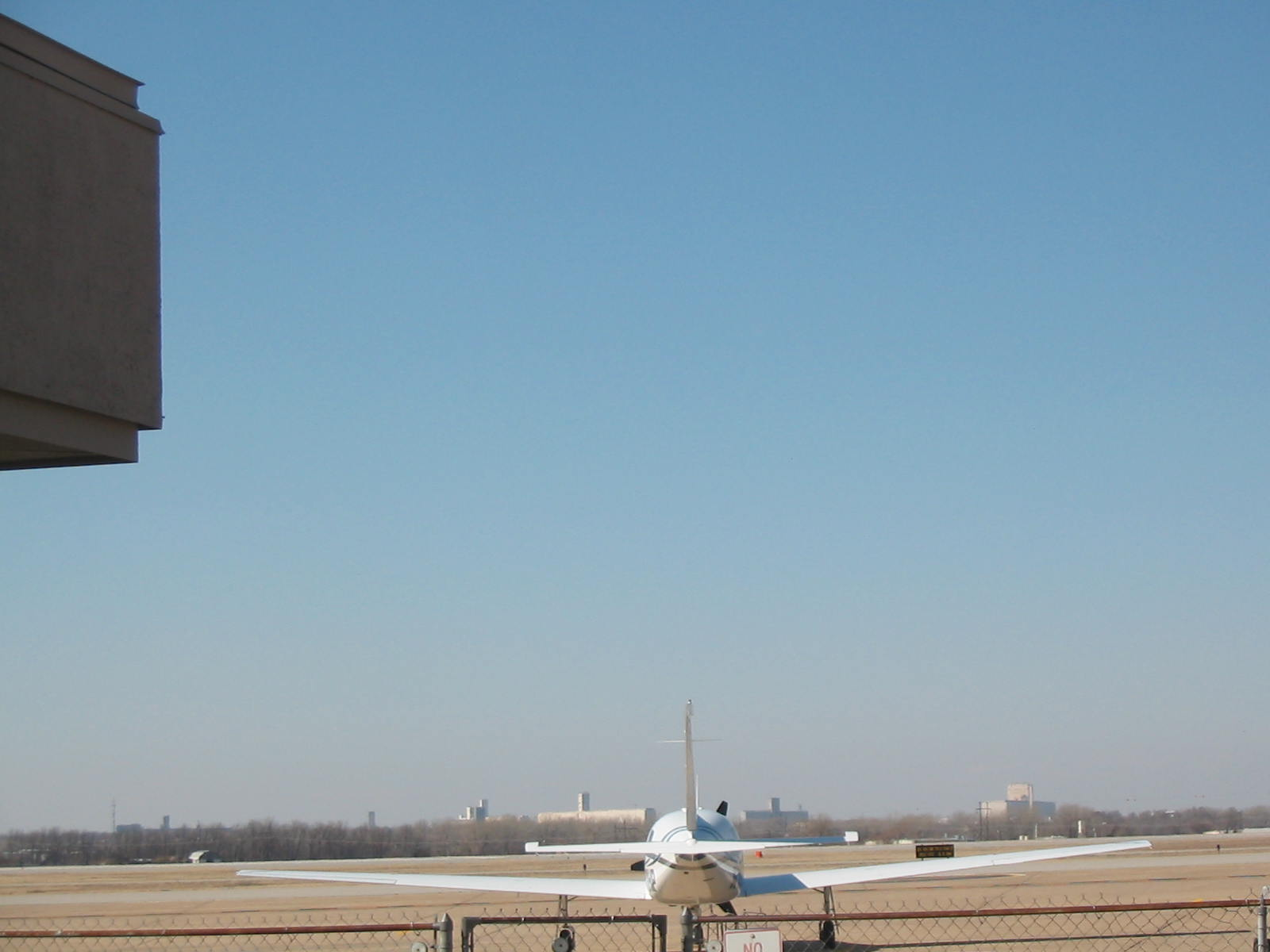
A plane can be seen at Woodring Airport with the Enid skyline in the background.

== See also ==
- List of airports in Oklahoma
