= McAlester Regional Airport =

Airport in Oklahoma, United States

- IATA: MLC; ICAO: KMLC; FAA LID: MLC

Summary
- Airport type: Public
- Owner: City of McAlester
- Serves: McAlester, Oklahoma
- Elevation AMSL: 770 ft (230 m)
- Coordinates: 34°52′57″N 95°47′00″W
- Interactive map of McAlester Regional Airport

Runways
Direction	Length		Surface
Direction	ft	m	Surface
2/20	5,602	1,707	Concrete

Statistics (2005)
- Aircraft operations: 9,000
- Based aircraft: 45
- Source: Federal Aviation Administration

McAlester Regional Airport (IATA: MLC, ICAO: KMLC, FAA LID: MLC) is in Pittsburg County, Oklahoma, three miles (5 km) southwest of McAlester, which owns it. The airport has no scheduled airline flights. Ground services are provided by Brenair Aviation Services. In 1938 McAlester had an airport, probably just north of the present one. After a 4000-ft paved runway opened in 1950-52 on the present site, McAlester Airport began receiving scheduled commercial airline service.

== Historical airline service ==
Central Airlines started scheduling Douglas DC-3s to McAlester in 1952 as one of many stops along a route between Amarillo and Dallas/Fort Worth. By 1961 Central had changed the service at McAlester to become a stop along a route between Kansas City and Dallas/Fort Worth. In 1967 Central merged into the original Frontier Airlines which continued service to McAlester until 1968, also using DC-3 aircraft.

SMB Stage Line of Fort Worth, TX replaced Frontier by operating a passenger service through McAlester to Tulsa via Muskogee and to Dallas via Paris, TX using Beechcraft 99 airliners from 1968 until early 1975. The service was not successful and SMB Stage Line reverted to all-cargo. Frontier then returned to McAlester operating Convair 580 aircraft until 1980.

Metro Airlines operated commuter airline flights from McAlester to Oklahoma City and Dallas/Fort Worth using de Havilland Canada DHC-6 Twin Otter aircraft from 1981 through 1984. Eagle Commuter Airlines then operated flights to DFW in 1985.

Exec Express began flights from McAlester to Tulsa in 1985 then later switched to DFW using Piper Navajo and Beechcraft 99 aircraft. Service ended in 1989.

The last scheduled airline at McAlester was Pacific Coast Airlines, which flew Piper Navajos to Oklahoma City in the early 1990s. The service lasted less than a year.

== Facilities ==
The airport covers 257 acres (104 ha); its one runway, 2/20, is 5,602 x 100 ft (1,707 x 30 m) concrete.

In the year ending September 12, 2005 the airport had 9,000 aircraft operations, average 24 per day: 73% general aviation, 17% air taxi and 10% military. 45 aircraft are based at the airport: 89% single-engine, 9% multi-engine and 2% helicopter.

== See also ==
- List of airports in Oklahoma
