= Memorial Field Airport =

Airport in Arkansas, United States

- IATA: HOT; ICAO: KHOT; FAA LID: HOT

Summary
- Airport type: Public
- Owner: City of Hot Springs
- Serves: Hot Springs, Arkansas
- Elevation AMSL: 540 ft (160 m)
- Coordinates: 34°28′41″N 093°05′46″W
- Website: hotspringsairport.net

Map
- Location of airport in Arkansas HOT (the United States)

Runways
Direction	Length		Surface
Direction	ft	m	Surface
5/23	6,595	2,010	Asphalt
13/31	4,098	1,249	Asphalt

Statistics
- Aircraft operations (2021): 29,800
- Based aircraft (2022): 77
- Source: FAA and airport website

Memorial Field Airport (IATA: HOT, ICAO: KHOT, FAA LID: HOT) is located in Hot Springs, Arkansas, United States, 3 miles (4.8 km; 2.6 nmi) southwest of Downtown Hot Springs. It serves nearby Hot Springs National Park. The airport is used for general aviation; airline flights are subsidized by the federal government's Essential Air Service program at a cost of $1,637,012 (per year). The National Plan of Integrated Airport Systems for 2021–2025 categorized it as a general aviation airport (the commercial service category requires at least 2,500 enplanements per year).

== Facilities ==
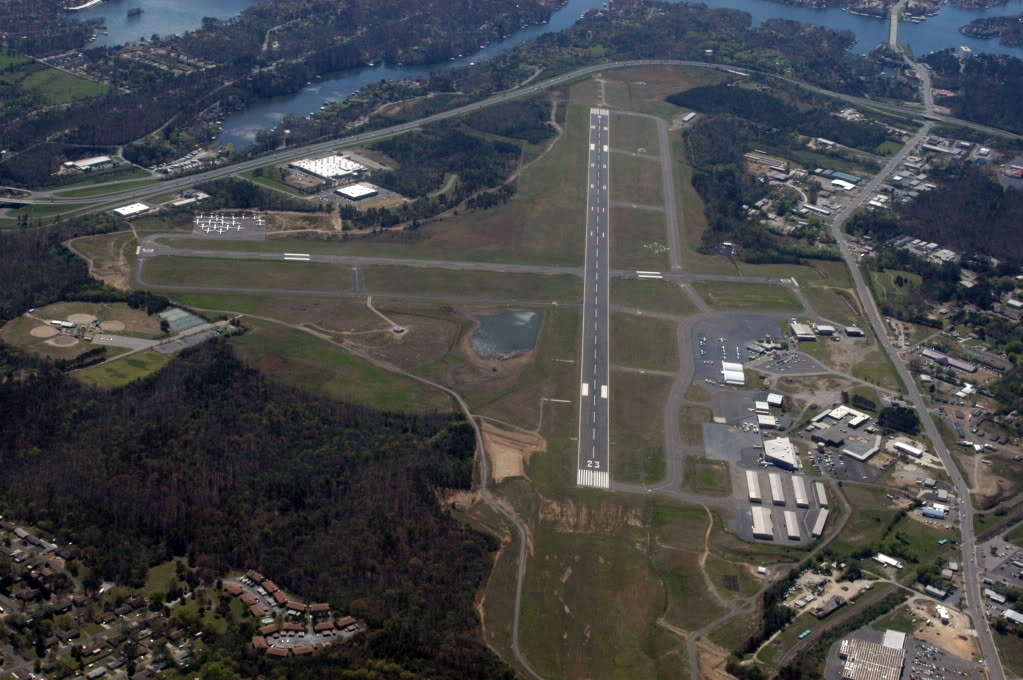
Aerial view

Memorial Field covers 844 acres (342 ha) at an elevation of 540 feet (165 m). It has two asphalt runways: 5/23 is 6,595 by 150 feet (2,010 x 46 m) and 13/31 is 4,098 by 100 feet (1,249 x 30 m). The airport is non-towered (the existing tower is no longer staffed).

In the year ending August 31, 2021, the airport had 29,800 aircraft operations, an average of 82 per day: 91% general aviation, 6% air taxi and 3% military. In April 2022, there were 77 aircraft based at this airport: 60 single-engine, 9 multi-engine, 6 jet and 2 helicopter.

== Airlines and destinations ==
Airlines	Destinations
Southern Airways Express	Dallas/Fort Worth, Memphis; Seasonal: Harrison/Branson

=== Historical airline service ===
Hot Springs' first commercial airline service began in the late 1940s with Chicago and Southern Air Lines (C&S). In 1950 C&S was operating daily round trip Douglas DC-3 service on a routing of Detroit - Toledo, OH - Fort Wayne, IN - Indianapolis - Evansville, IN - Paducah, KY - Memphis - Hot Springs - Shreveport - Houston (Hobby Airport). C&S merged with Delta Air Lines in 1953 and Delta continued serving Hot Springs using Convair 440 propliners with nonstop flights to Little Rock and Shreveport and direct, no change of plane service to Chicago (Midway Airport), Houston (Hobby Airport), New Orleans, St. Louis and other destinations. Shortly before discontinuing service in mid-1969, Delta had upgraded their flights with McDonnell Douglas DC-9-30 jets. The April 27, 1969 Delta system timetable listed two daily DC-9-30 jet flights being operated by the airline into the airport at this time with a northbound service operating a routing of Houston Hobby Airport - Shreveport - Hot Springs - Little Rock - Memphis - Indianapolis - Detroit and a southbound service operating a routing of Chicago O'Hare Airport - St. Louis - Memphis - Little Rock - Hot Springs - Shreveport - Houston Hobby Airport.

Trans-Texas Airways, (TTa), began service in 1953 using Douglas DC-3 aircraft with a daily round trip "milk run" flight routing of Memphis - West Helena, AR - Stuttgart, AR - Pine Bluff, AR - Little Rock - Hot Springs - Texarkana - Tyler, TX - Dallas - Fort Worth. During the 1960s TTa upgraded their service using Convair 240 piston propliners and later to Convair 600 turboprops In 1968, the airline began operating the first jet service to Memorial Airport using the Douglas DC-9-10 with a daily nonstop flight to Dallas and was also flying direct, one stop DC-9 service to Memphis via Little Rock. Trans-Texas then changed its name to Texas International Airlines in 1969. Texas International (TI) continued to serve Hot Springs with DC-9 jetliners on a daily basis and in 1970 was flying nonstop to Memphis and Texarkana with continuing, direct service to Dallas and Houston. By 1972, TI was operating daily DC-9 jet service from Los Angeles (LAX) to Hot Springs via intermediate stops in Albuquerque and Dallas (Love Field).

Central Airlines began service to Hot Springs by 1955 on a new route between Tulsa and Little Rock which made stops in Fort Smith, AR and Hot Springs using Douglas DC-3s and later upgrading to Convair 600 turboprops in the mid-1960s. Central was merged into original Frontier Airlines (1950-1986) in 1967 and continued to serve Hot Springs with Convair 580 and Convair 600 turboprops nonstop to Fayetteville, AR, Fort Smith, Little Rock and Memphis at different times over the years. In 1967, Frontier was flying nonstop to Fort Smith and Little Rock with direct service being operated to Kansas City, Omaha and Denver.

Through the 1950s and 1960s Hot Springs was served by three airlines consecutively. In early 1969 there were a total of 13 departures per day, four of them on DC-9 jets (two on Delta and two on Texas International). Delta then discontinued its service to the airport later in 1969. According to the Official Airline Guide (OAG), two airlines were serving the airport in early 1976: the original Frontier Airlines and Texas International with a combined total of seven flights into the airport every weekday with Frontier operating nonstop flights from Fort Smith and Little Rock as well as direct, no change of plane service from Amarillo, Denver, Liberal, KS, Memphis, Oklahoma City and Tulsa with all of its flights operated with Convair 580 turboprops while Texas International was operating nonstop flights from Memphis and Texarkana as well as direct, one stop service from Dallas/Fort Worth International Airport and Jonesboro, AR operated with Convair 600 turboprops. This same OAG also lists a Texas International Douglas DC-9-10 jet flight which operated on Saturdays only with an international service of a sorts as it flew a one way routing of Little Rock - Hot Springs - Dallas/Fort Worth - Houston Intercontinental Airport - Monterey, Mexico. Texas International was also operating a Saturdays only DC-9 jet flight on a one way routing of Austin, TX - Dallas/Fort Worth - Hot Springs - Little Rock at this same time according to the OAG.

With the passing of the Airline Deregulation Act, Frontier and Texas International both discontinued service by 1979 at which time commuter airlines began serving Hot Springs with direct propjet flights to Dallas/Ft. Worth, Houston, Kansas City, Memphis and Tulsa. Rio Airways served the airport from 1979 through 1983, Scheduled Skyways from 1983 through 1985, Air Midwest from 1985 through 1986, and Lone Star Airlines from 1989 through 1998. All flew Fairchild Swearingen Metroliners. Rio previously flew Beechcraft 99 turboprops nonstop to Dallas/Fort Worth and Memphis and Lone Star operated Dornier 328 propjets on the DFW route as well. Lone Star first operated as Exec Express II using Piper Navajo twin prop aircraft to DFW and was operating as Aspen Mountain Air at the end of their service. From early 1999 through September, 2002, Big Sky Airlines served Hot Springs followed by Mesa Airlines from October, 2002 through May, 2008. SeaPort Airlines began flights in March, 2010 using Pilatus PC-12 aircraft but went out of business in September, 2016. The current provider, Southern Airways Express, began service in March 2017 with nonstop flights to DFW using single engine Cessna 208 Caravan aircraft. Memorial Airport had several periods in between carriers where there was no airline service. Most passengers now use the Clinton National Airport (LIT) located in Little Rock, Arkansas.

=== Accidents involving HOT ===
On August 25, 1992, a Lone Star Airlines Swearingen SA227-AC Metro III on a test flight crashed after takeoff 1 km SE of Memorial Field Airport due to improper maintenance of all primary flight control cables. All three occupants were killed.

== See also ==
- List of airports in Arkansas

== Other sources ==
- Essential Air Service documents (Docket OST-1997-2935) from the U.S. Department of Transportation:
  - Order 2005-1-14: selecting Air Midwest, Inc., to provide essential air service at El Dorado/Camden, Jonesboro, Harrison and Hot Springs, Arkansas, at a subsidy rate of $4,155,550 annually for a two-year rate term.
  - Order 2007-1-7: selecting Air Midwest, Inc. to provide essential air service at El Dorado/Camden, Jonesboro, Harrison and Hot Springs, Arkansas, at a subsidy rate of $4,296,348 annually for the two-year rate term beginning April 1, 2007.
  - Order 2009-6-25: tentatively selecting Alaska Juneau Aeronautics, Inc. d/b/a SeaPort Airlines (SeaPort) to provide subsidized essential air service (EAS) at El Dorado/Camden, Harrison, Hot Springs, and Jonesboro, Arkansas, for two years.
  - Order 2009-7-8: making final the tentative selection of Alaska Juneau Aeronautics, Inc. d/b/a SeaPort Airlines, to provide essential air service at El Dorado/Camden, Harrison, Hot Springs, and Jonesboro, Arkansas.
