= Mountain Air Express =

Regional airline of the United States (1996–1998)

IATA	ICAO	Call sign
M7	PKP	PIKES PEAK
- Founded: 1996
- Ceased operations: 1998
- Hubs: Colorado Springs(1996–1997); Denver (1997–1998)
- Parent company: Western Pacific Airlines

Mountain Air Express (MAX) was a short-lived commuter airline in the United States founded in 1996. The air carrier was established by Western Pacific Airlines in order to provide passenger feed.

== History ==
It flew Dornier 328 turboprops and operated via a codeshare agreement with Western Pacific. MAX initially served such smaller communities as Aspen, CO and Casper, WY from its hub located at the Colorado Springs Airport where Western Pacific operated a hub as well. However, flights to larger cities were subsequently operated from Denver including nonstop service to Kansas City, Oklahoma City, Salt Lake City and Tulsa.

In 1997, Western Pacific Airlines moved its hub from Colorado Springs to Denver International Airport. MAX followed Western Pacific to Denver. Just after this move, Western Pacific announced its plans to merge with Frontier Airlines. The merger was not successful and Western Pacific declared Chapter 7 Bankruptcy in February 1998. This left MAX without a codeshare partner and it was subsequently sold in 1998 to Air Wisconsin. During the same year, United Airlines ended its codesharing agreement with United Express carrier Mesa Airlines. Great Lakes Aviation and Air Wisconsin were then selected as the new United Express carriers replacing Mesa. The purchase of MAX gave Air Wisconsin the aircraft and crews it needed for its newly expanded code sharing agreement with United Airlines.

== Destinations ==
The following destination information is taken from Western Pacific Airlines system timetables dated June 29, 1997 and November 16, 1997, as they contained Mountain Air Express flight schedules as well. Mountain Air Express moved its hub from Colorado Springs to Denver in 1997.

- Albuquerque, NM (ABQ)
- Aspen, CO (ASE)
- Casper, WY (CPR)
- Cheyenne, WY (CYS)
- Colorado Springs, CO (COS) - Initial hub
- Denver, CO (DEN) - Subsequent hub
- Durango, CO (DRO)
- Gunnison, CO (GUC)
- Grand Junction, CO (GJT)
- Hayden, CO/Steamboat Springs, CO (HDN)
- Kansas City, KS (MCI)
- Montrose, CO (MTJ)
- Oklahoma City, OK (OKC)
- Salt Lake City, UT (SLC)
- Santa Fe, NM (SAF)
- Tulsa, OK (TUL)

== Fleet ==
- 9 Dornier 328

== See also ==
- List of defunct airlines of the United States
