= Colorado Springs Airport =

Airport in Colorado Springs, Colorado, U.S.

City of Colorado Springs Municipal Airport
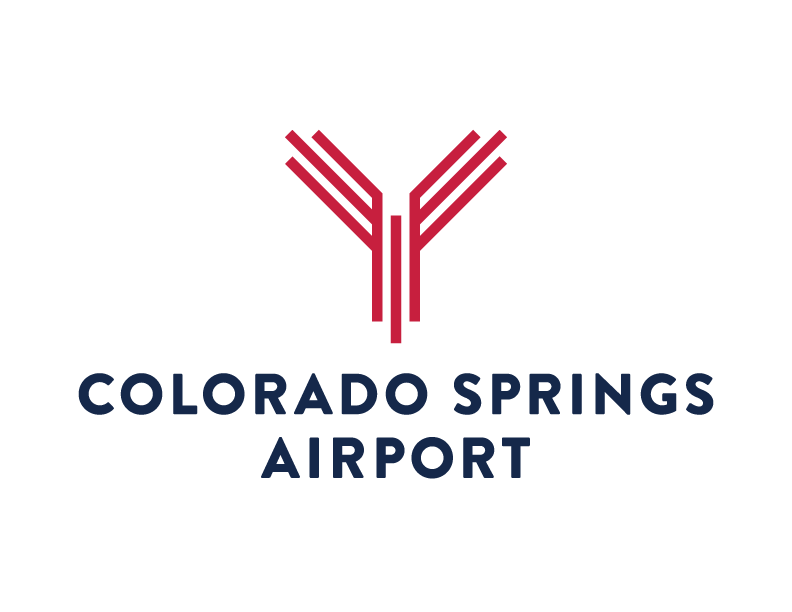

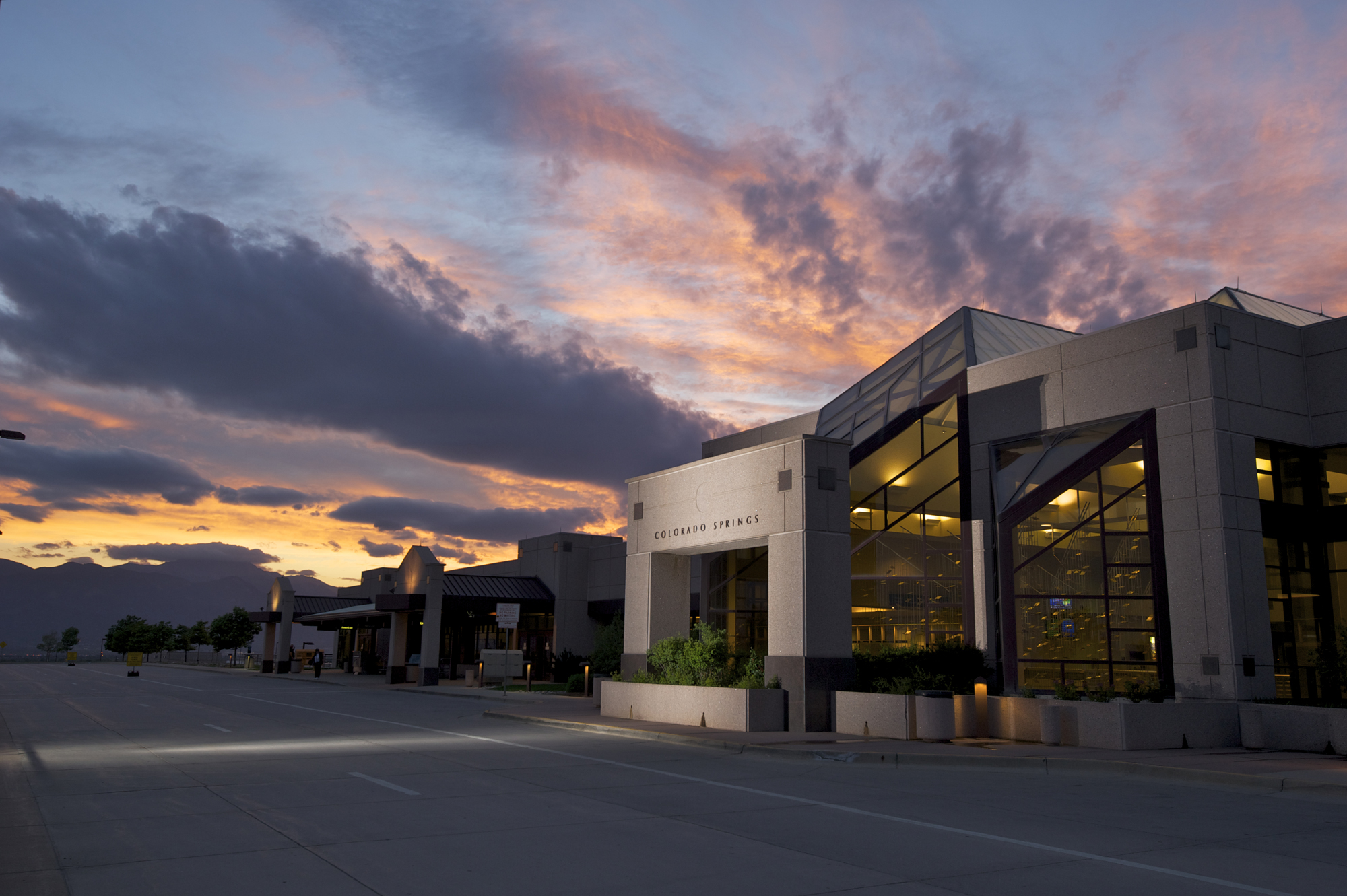
- IATA: COS; ICAO: KCOS; FAA LID: COS; WMO: 72466

Summary
- Airport type: Public / military
- Owner/Operator: City of Colorado Springs
- Serves: Colorado Springs, Colorado
- Elevation AMSL: 6,187 ft (1,886 m)
- Coordinates: 38°48′21″N 104°42′03″W
- Website: www.flycos.com

Maps
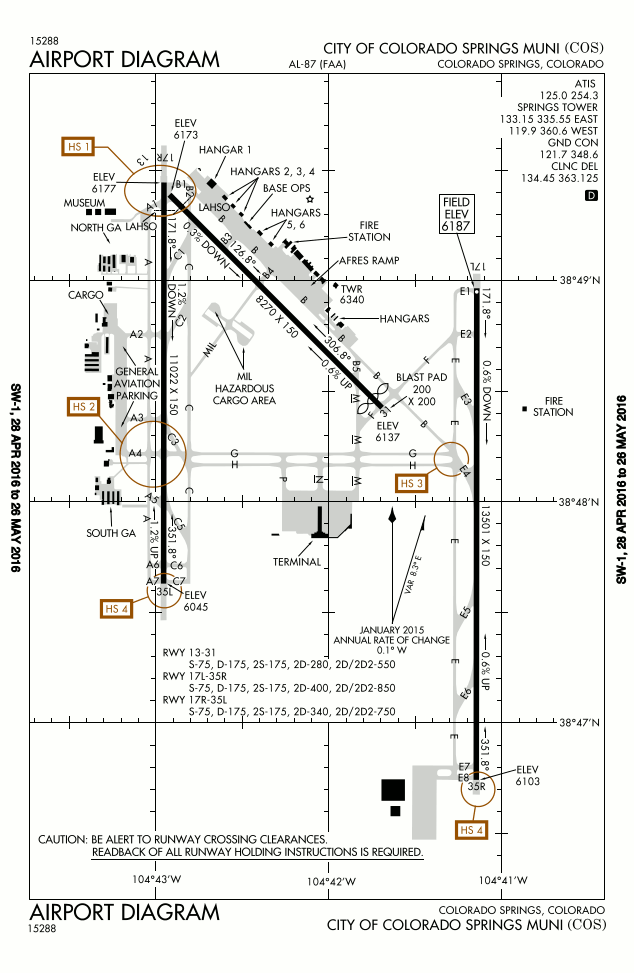
- FAA airport diagram
- Interactive map of City of Colorado Springs Municipal Airport

Runways
| Direction | Length | | Surface |
| Direction | ft | m | Surface |
|---|---|---|---|
| 17L/35R | 13,500 | 4,115 | Concrete |
| 17R/35L | 11,022 | 3,360 | Asphalt |
| 13/31 | 8,270 | 2,521 | Asphalt |

Statistics (2025)
- Total passengers: 2,448,001
- Aircraft operations: 163,627
- Sources: Colorado Springs Airport

City of Colorado Springs Municipal Airport (IATA: COS, ICAO: KCOS, FAA LID: COS), also known as Colorado Springs Airport, is owned by the city of Colorado Springs, adjacent to Peterson Space Force Base, Colorado, United States. The airport is 6 miles (9.7 km) southeast of downtown Colorado Springs. It is the second largest commercial service airport in the state after Denver International Airport.

The military part of the airport, known as Peterson Space Force Base, originally operated primarily by the United States Air Force, now hosts Space Base Delta 1 in addition to the Air Force Reserve 302nd Airlift Wing under lease. The base itself is located on the north side of runway 13/31.

A established civilian terminal eventually opened in 1942, as more people were being introduced to the city, it received more expansions. It is operated by the City of Colorado Springs under the name "Colorado Springs Airport", after the city. American, Delta, Southwest, and United provide service to Colorado Springs year-round and Allegiant seasonally.

== History ==
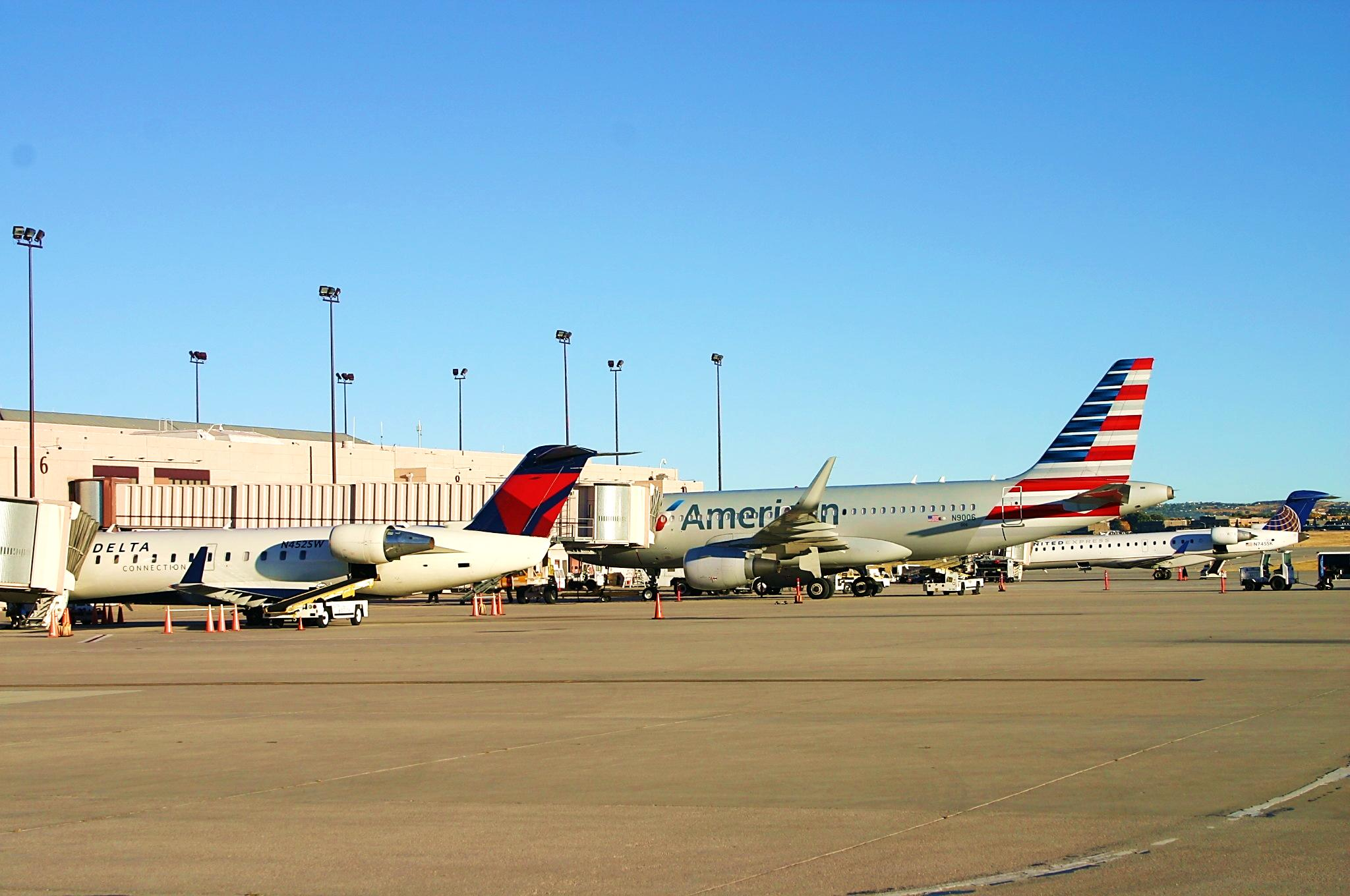
Busy morning ramp

In 1927, the airport opened on 640 acres (260 ha) 7 miles (11 km) east of the city, with two gravel runways. For the first ten years several small airlines operated a mail route from Cheyenne, Wyoming, to Pueblo, Colorado, with stops at Denver and Colorado Springs. These airlines only occasionally carried passengers. In 1937, Continental Airlines began service between Denver and El Paso, Texas, with stops at Colorado Springs, Pueblo, Las Vegas, New Mexico, Santa Fe, and Albuquerque. In 1943 Braniff Airways began service on a Denver-Colorado Springs-Pueblo-Amarillo route. At Amarillo, flights would continue onto Dallas and Houston or onto Oklahoma City, Tulsa, Little Rock, and Memphis. The first municipal terminal was built in 1942 in an art deco style. Soon after the terminal was built the field was taken over by the military in the months preceding World War II. After the war, the city regained control.

In 1966, a new terminal was built on the west side of the runways, just east of Powers Boulevard. This terminal expanded by the 1980s, with a six gate addition. By 1991 the airport had three 150-foot (46 m) wide runways, one 13,501 feet (4,115 m) long, making it the longest runway in Colorado until 16R/34L, a 16,000-foot (4,900 m) runway, opened at Denver International Airport in September 2003. In 1991 the city approved a new terminal, two miles east of the former terminal, in the south-center part of the airport. The 280,000-square-foot (26,000 m^{2}) terminal opened on October 22, 1994, with 12 gates; it was designed by the Van Sant Group and cost $140 million. In the 1990s a second, five-gate concourse was added on the east side of the main terminal.

In 1996, the 1941 passenger terminal, two hangars, and a caretaker residence — by that time all located on Peterson Air Force Base — were inscribed on the National Register of Historic Places. They form the campus of the Peterson Air and Space Museum.

From the 1980s to the present day, the airport has tried to expand service. The largest number of passengers was nearly 5 million in 1996 when now-defunct Western Pacific Airlines had a hub at COS (Western Pacific moved the hub to Denver International Airport in late 1996). Their timetable for June 15 shows 33 daily departures to 20 airports between the west coast and Newark and Washington Dulles. Frontier Airlines added and dropped various routes from Colorado Springs throughout the 2010s. Southwest Airlines announced in October 2020 that they would begin serving the airport in 2021. Southwest conducted their first flights in March 2021, which has since bolstered the airport's commercial traffic.

In May 2021, the airport began a pavement rehabilitation project, closing runway 17R/35L for remodeling. The upgrades include new asphalt, lighting, and navigation equipment. The airport announced in November 2021 that the main concourse (gates 1–12) will undergo a $10–$20 million renovation and will be completed in 3 to 5 years. The concourse was completed in 1994 and has not been renovated since then. The design has become outdated, prompting airport officials to renovate. On March 1, officials announced that COS will receive a $6 million grant to complete the planned renovation. Construction will start in the summer of 2023.

In March 2022, the Colorado Springs Airport released a plan to expand the airport, with plans to double the number of gates from 12 to 24, relocate the control tower, and consolidate other airport services.

== Facilities ==
The airport covers 7,200 acres (29 km^{2}) and has three paved runways: 17L/35R, 13,500 ft × 150 ft (4,115 m × 46 m) long, 17R/35L, 11,022 ft × 150 ft (3,360 m × 46 m) and 13/31, 8,270 ft × 150 ft (2,521 m × 46 m).

Colorado Springs Airport has one terminal with two concourses. However, only one, the larger concourse housing gates 1–12, has ever been put to commercial use; the second concourse (called the Western Pacific Airlines concourse) contains gates 14–18 (there is no gate 13) and is now mainly used for meetings. Access between the concourses requires leaving the secure area, walking through the main terminal and down a long hallway. There is no public access to these gates. The gates were previously planned to be demolished. However, with the beginning of flights to Cancun, the area has been renovated to serve as an international arrivals inspection facility.

== Airlines and destinations ==
=== Passenger ===
| Airlines | Destinations |
|---|---|
| Allegiant Air | Orange County, Phoenix/Mesa, St. Petersburg/Clearwater |
| American Airlines | Dallas/Fort Worth |
| American Eagle | Chicago–O'Hare, Dallas/Fort Worth |
| Delta Air Lines | Atlanta |
| Delta Connection | Salt Lake City; Seasonal: Minneapolis/St. Paul |
| Southwest Airlines | Chicago–Midway, Denver, Las Vegas, Phoenix–Sky Harbor, San Diego; Seasonal: Cancún, Houston–Hobby, San Antonio |
| United Airlines | Denver |
| United Express | Chicago–O'Hare, Denver, Houston–Intercontinental |

== Statistics ==
=== Annual traffic at COS ===
COS annual traffic, 2017–present
| Year | Passengers | % change |
|---|---|---|
| 2017 | 1,674,947 | — |
| 2018 | 1,725,037 | ▲3.0% |
| 2019 | 1,671,757 | ▼3.1% |
| 2020 | 727,742 | ▼56.5% |
| 2021 | 1,864,485 | ▲11.5% |
| 2022 | 2,134,618 | ▲14.5% |
| 2023 | 2,347,008 | ▲9.9% |
| 2024 | 2,473,099 | ▲5.4% |
| 2025 | 2,448,001 | ▼1.0% |

=== Top destinations ===
Busiest domestic routes from COS (July 2025 – June 2026)
| Rank | City | Passengers | Carriers |
|---|---|---|---|
| 1 | Denver, Colorado | 350,070 | Southwest, United |
| 2 | Dallas/Fort Worth, Texas | 193,020 | American |
| 3 | Phoenix–Sky Harbor, Arizona | 108,660 | Southwest |
| 4 | Las Vegas, Nevada | 91,440 | Southwest |
| 5 | Dallas–Love, Texas | 87,700 | Southwest |
| 6 | Atlanta, Georgia | 82,110 | Delta |
| 7 | Chicago–O'Hare, Illinois | 70,760 | United, American |
| 8 | Houston–Intercontinental, Texas | 44,580 | United |
| 9 | Salt Lake City, Utah | 41,470 | Delta |
| 10 | Chicago–Midway, Illinois | 26,420 | Southwest |

=== Airline market share ===
Largest airlines at COS (July 2025 – June 2026)
| Rank | Airline | Passengers | Share |
|---|---|---|---|
| 1 | Southwest Airlines | 1,009,000 | 42.19% |
| 2 | SkyWest Airlines | 577,000 | 24.16% |
| 3 | American Airlines | 286,000 | 11.97% |
| 4 | Delta Air Lines | 179,000 | 7.50% |
| 5 | United Airlines | 179,000 | 7.49% |
| | Other Airlines | 160,000 | 6.68% |

== Ground transport ==
=== Location and access ===
The airport is located on the east side of Colorado Springs, accessible by Milton E. Proby Parkway via Powers Boulevard/SH 21. Milton E. Proby Parkway loops through the airport running north to the terminal, with exits to long and short term parking and rental car return, and eventually splits into an upper departures drop-off area and lower arrivals pick-up area east of the terminal. The road converges again on the west side of the terminal and runs south, joined by access roads, parking lot exits, and rental car exits. There is also an exit to return to the terminal via the northbound airport entrance.

Milton E. Proby Parkway also provides access to other airport facilities and tenants, including a Northrop Grumman building and an Amazon distribution center via Peak Innovation Parkway.

Powers Boulevard/SH 21, a primary expressway in El Paso County, runs west of the airport and provides easy access to general and private aviation hangars, maintenance facilities (including the SkyWest hangar), and FBOs (Cutter Aviation, jetCenter, and the J.H.W. Hangar Complex). The expressway also provides north-south access to the Colorado Springs and Falcon (via Highway 24) region.

=== Shuttles and buses ===
The airport is serviced by Colorado Springs' public transportation system, Mountain Metropolitan Transit. Service from private transportation, such as Groome Transportation, is also available.

=== Rental vehicles ===
Alamo, Avis, Budget, Dollar, Enterprise, Hertz, and National Car Rental provide on-airport car rentals. The rental car check in counters are located on the lower level outside of the secured area, across from baggage claim.

== Accidents and incidents ==
- On March 3, 1991, United Airlines Flight 585, a Boeing 737-291 flying from Peoria, Illinois, to Colorado Springs via Denver, crashed on final approach to Colorado Springs Runway 35 (now 35L) after a rudder malfunction caused the aircraft to roll over and dive, killing all 25 on board.
- On December 21, 1997, a Beechcraft King Air operated by Aviation Charter flying in from Minneapolis St. Paul International Airport impacted terrain at Colorado Springs Airport in fog during a missed instrument landing system (ILS) approach. Both passengers on board were Northwest Airlines mechanics being flown in to repair a Northwest Airlines aircraft at COS. The pilot and one passenger were killed; the other passenger sustained serious injuries.
- On April 15, 2021, a Learjet 35A operated by Med Air Inc suffered substantial damage on landing at COS because of the flight crew's improper decision to continue the unstabilized approach, which resulted in an aerodynamic stall and impact with the runway during landing. All 4 occupants survived, but the right wing suffered major damage and the aircraft was written off.

== See also ==
- List of airports in Colorado
