= Western Pacific Airlines =

Low-cost airline of the United States (1994–1998)

| IATA | ICAO | Call sign |
|---|---|---|
| W7 | KMR | KOMSTAR |
- Founded: 1994 (as Commercial Air)
- Commenced operations: April 28, 1995
- Ceased operations: February 4, 1998
- Hubs: Colorado Springs (1994–1996); Denver (1996–1998)
- Subsidiaries: Mountain Air Express (1996–1998)
- Headquarters: Colorado Springs, Colorado

Western Pacific Airlines, or WestPac, was an airline which operated in the United States from 1995 to 1998. A low-cost carrier, it was formed in 1994 under the name Commercial Air, later changed to Western Pacific, and began operating scheduled passenger flights on April 28, 1995, with eight Boeing 737-300s. Edward Gaylord of Gaylord Entertainment Company was involved in the formation and management of the airline. Its headquarters were in unincorporated El Paso County, Colorado, near Colorado Springs.

Originally based at Colorado Springs Airport, Western Pacific routes were mainly west of the Mississippi River. Routes were extended to the eastern U.S. and on the west coast as new Boeing 737-300 aircraft were acquired. At one point the airline operated leased Boeing 727-200 jetliners as well. The airline declared bankruptcy in February 1998 and ceased operations.

== Color in the Sky ==
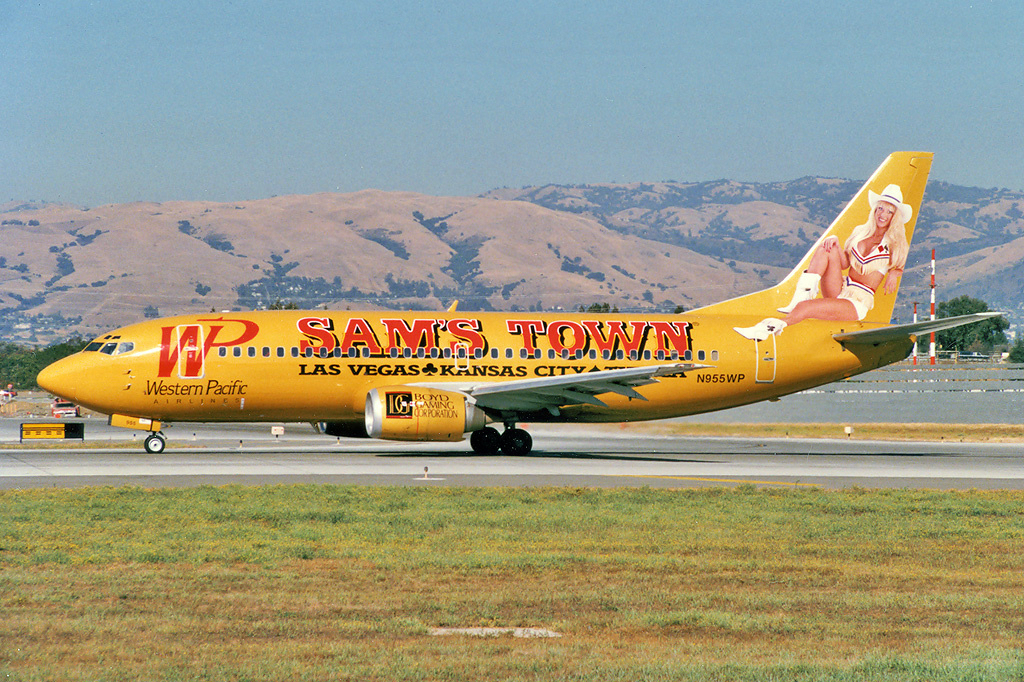
Boeing 737 advertising Sam's Town

The WestPac livery could be encountered in variations on the basic Western Pacific livery, but most aircraft were painted in logojet schemes. They included advertisements for:

- Stardust Resort & Casino – Las Vegas, Nevada (N950WP)
- Purgatory Ski Resort – Durango, Colorado (N946WP)
- Womack's Casino – Cripple Creek, Colorado (N962WP)
- Crested Butte Resort – Gunnison, Colorado (N953WP)
- The Broadmoor – Colorado Springs, Colorado (N947WP)
- Thrifty Car Rental – U.S. car rental chain (N961WP)
- ProRodeo Hall of Fame and Museum of the American Cowboy – Colorado Springs, Colorado (N375TA)
- The Simpsons – FOX–TV television show (N949WP)
- Spirit of Durango – City of Durango, Colorado Board of Tourism (N946WP)
- Security Service Federal Credit Union – Colorado Credit Union (N948WP)
- Colorado Tech University – Denver, Colorado & Colorado Springs, Colorado (N503AU)
- Colorado Springs – City of Colorado Springs, Colorado Board of Tourism (N951WP)
- Sam's Town – Boyd Gaming properties in Las Vegas, Nevada; Kansas City, Missouri; and Tunica, Mississippi (N955WP and N956WP)

The company also had other schemes with no corporate affiliations or advertising. They were:

- Spring Fling Jet (N962WP)
- “Beat the System” (N301AU)
- Winter Wonder Plane (N962WP)
- Super Summer Saver Jet (N962WP)
- Future Logo Jet (N372US)

In 1995, a marketing promotion with Rupert Murdoch’s American Fox network led to one of the airline's Boing 737-300 being painted with characters from The Simpsons. According to Fox, this was because it would "give people a chuckle" and that "people at the airport will notice it."

== Expansion ==
Western Pacific was involved with the creation of a new commuter airline, Mountain Air Express (MAX), which began operations in 1996 flying Dornier 328 turboprops. MAX provided passenger feed for Western Pacific at Colorado Springs and later at Denver.

Earlier, Western Pacific had leased two (2) Boeing 727-200 jetliners from Express One International to initiate new service to Washington Dulles International Airport (IAD) during the airline's expansion in 1995.

== Decline ==
In 1989 Denver announced that Denver International Airport would replace Stapleton International Airport. Since the airport was self-funded it would charge higher-than-normal landing fees to pay back the bonds. Denver International Airport was also twice as far from Denver as Stapleton International Airport. Shortly before the opening of the airport Continental Airlines shut down their Denver hub, leaving Denver as a hub for only one carrier, United Airlines, whereas Stapleton had once been a hub for airlines like the original Frontier Airlines (1950-1986) and Western Airlines.

Effort was made by airlines to explore using a secondary airport as their hub, taking Stapleton's place in the Denver area without incurring the high landing fees of Denver International Airport. Centennial Airport in Denver, Jeffco Airport in Broomfield and Colorado Springs Airport were considered, although Colorado Springs was chosen as the hub for Western Pacific when the airline first began operating scheduled passenger flights.

While Western Pacific's Colorado Springs hub had initially been successful and was beginning to divert traffic away from Denver, by 1997 the airline had not made a profit in two years of operation. Colorado Springs Airport is south of the Denver metropolitan area, limiting its appeal to front range travelers from much the Denver area. Western Pacific executives decided to move the hub from Colorado Springs to Denver International Airport in 1997.

A day after the move to Denver was completed, Western Pacific announced it would purchase the competing Denver-based Frontier Airlines (another new start up air carrier which initiated scheduled passenger flights during the 1990s and used the same name as the original Frontier Airlines (1950-1986) which in turn had acquired Continental's former gates at the Denver International Airport. The two carriers would immediately enter into a code sharing agreement with the Frontier flight schedule being secondary to Western Pacific's schedule. Western Pacific then shelved plans to expand their Colorado Springs hub.

The merger process with Frontier then began. However, after Frontier gained access to Western Pacific's financial records as a part of the due diligence process, Frontier and their bankers then decided to no longer pursue this opportunity and the merger was abruptly canceled, leading to Western Pacific's bankruptcy and also nearly destroying Frontier in the process.

Western Pacific declared Chapter 7 bankruptcy in February 1998. Frontier Airlines survived and currently operates a jet fleet that is approximately twice the size of the proposed combined Western Pacific-Frontier operation.

== Destinations ==
Western Pacific Airlines served the following destinations in the U.S. during its existence:

- Arizona
  - Phoenix – Phoenix Sky Harbor International Airport
- California
  - Los Angeles – Los Angeles International Airport
  - Ontario – Ontario International Airport
  - San Diego – San Diego International Airport
  - San Francisco – San Francisco International Airport
  - San Jose – Norman Y. Mineta San Jose International Airport
- Colorado
  - Colorado Springs – City of Colorado Springs Municipal Airport (Original Hub)
  - Denver – Stapleton International Airport then replaced by Denver International Airport (Subsequent Hub)
- Florida
  - Miami – Miami International Airport
  - Orlando – Orlando International Airport
- Georgia
  - Atlanta – Hartsfield–Jackson Atlanta International Airport
- Illinois
  - Chicago – Chicago Midway International Airport
- Indiana
  - Indianapolis – Indianapolis International Airport
- Kansas
  - Wichita – Wichita Dwight D. Eisenhower National Airport
- Missouri
  - Kansas City – Kansas City International Airport (also served by codeshare partner Mountain Air Express)
- Nevada
  - Las Vegas – Harry Reid International Airport
- New Jersey
  - Newark – Newark Liberty International Airport
- Oklahoma
  - Oklahoma City – OKC Will Rogers International Airport (also served by codeshare partner Mountain Air Express)
  - Tulsa – Tulsa International Airport (also served by codeshare partner Mountain Air Express)
- Oregon
  - Portland – Portland International Airport
- Tennessee
  - Nashville – Nashville International Airport
- Texas
  - Dallas/Fort Worth – Dallas Fort Worth International Airport
  - Houston – George Bush Intercontinental Airport
  - San Antonio – San Antonio International Airport
- Virginia
  - Washington, D.C. area – Washington Dulles International Airport
- Washington
  - Seattle/Tacoma – Seattle–Tacoma International Airport

== Mountain Air Express destinations ==
Mountain Air Express (MAX) served the following destinations on behalf of Western Pacific via a code sharing agreement. MAX was a wholly owned subsidiary of Western Pacific and was created to provide passenger feed. This regional airline operated Dornier 328 propjets.

- Albuquerque, NM - ABQ
- Aspen, CO - ASE
- Casper, WY - CPR
- Cheyenne, WY - CYS
- Colorado Springs, CO - COS
- Denver, CO - DEN
- Grand Junction, CO - GJT
- Gunnison, CO - GUC
- Hayden/Steamboat Springs, CO - HDN
- Kansas City, MO - MCI
- Oklahoma City, OK - OKC
- Salt Lake City, UT - SLC
- Santa Fe, NM - SAF
- Tulsa, OK - TUL

== Fleet ==
- 2 - Boeing 727-200 - leased from Express One in order to facilitate new routes
- 20 - Boeing 737-300 - main jet aircraft type in fleet
- Boeing 737-700 - on order at the time of cessation of all scheduled service (these aircraft were never delivered)

Codeshare partner Mountain Air Express operated Dornier 328 turboprop aircraft.

== See also ==
- List of defunct airlines of the United States
